= Heidelberg School =

19th-century Australian art movement

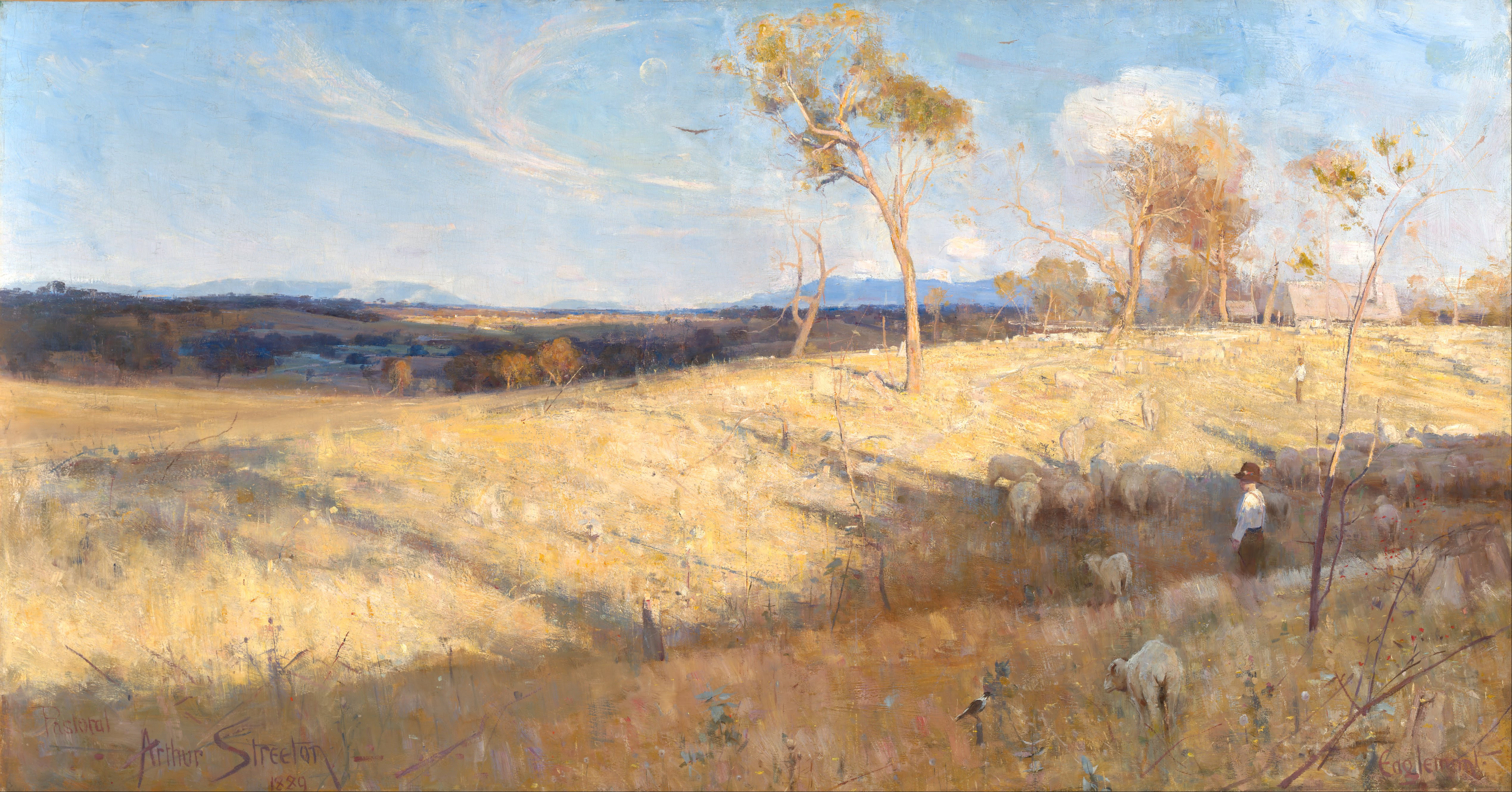
Arthur Streeton, Golden Summer, Eaglemont, 1889

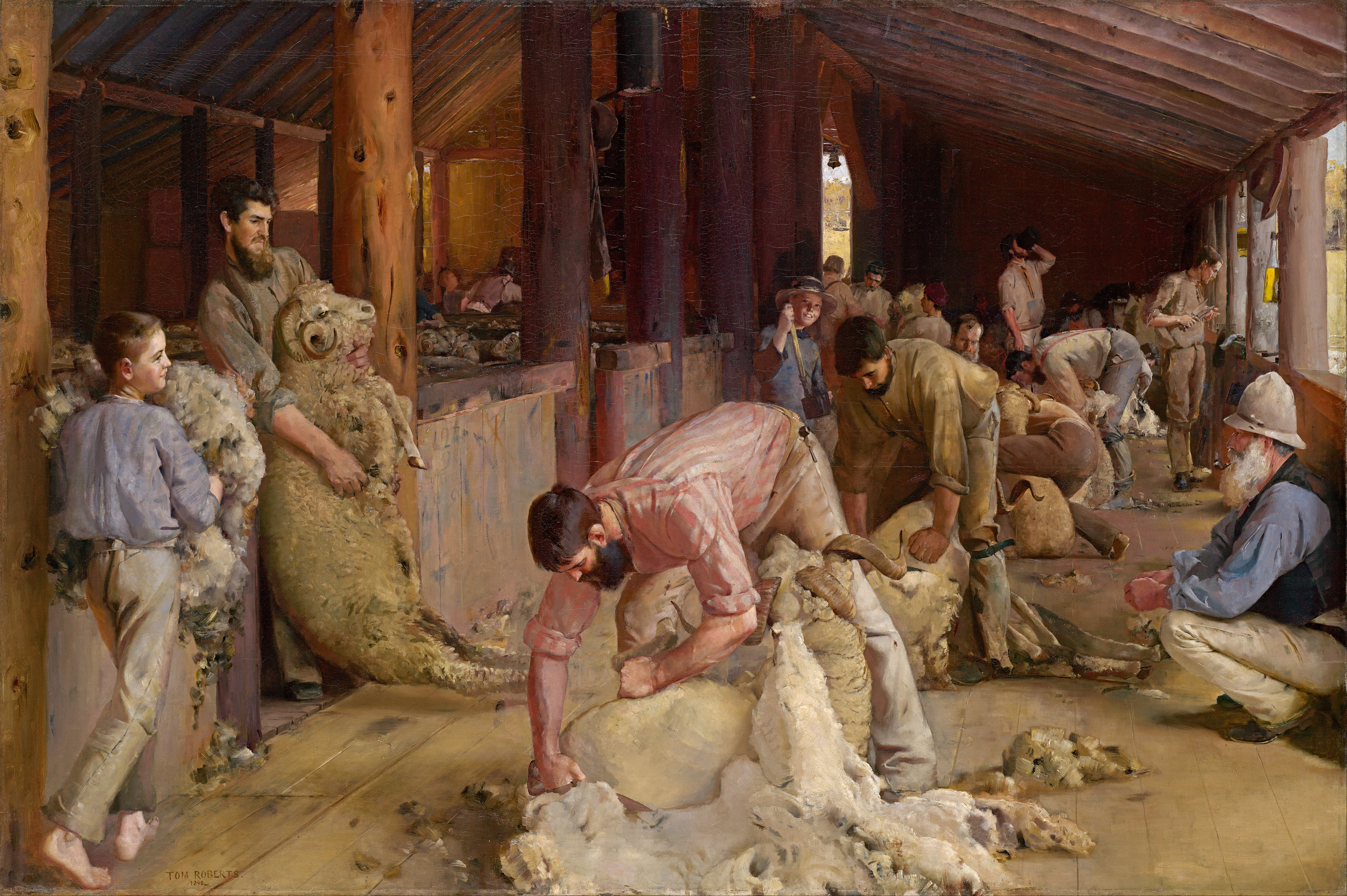
Tom Roberts, Shearing the Rams, 1890

The Heidelberg School was an Australian art movement of the late 19th century. It has been described as Australian impressionism.

Melbourne art critic Sidney Dickinson coined the term in an 1891 review of works by Arthur Streeton and Walter Withers, two local artists who painted en plein air in Heidelberg on the city's rural outskirts. The term has since evolved to cover these and other painters—most notably Tom Roberts, Charles Conder and Frederick McCubbin—who worked together at "artists' camps" around Melbourne and Sydney in the 1880s and 1890s. Drawing on naturalist and impressionist ideas, they sought to capture Australian life, the bush, and the harsh sunlight that typifies the country.

The movement emerged at a time of strong nationalist sentiment in the Australian colonies, then on the cusp of federating. The artists' paintings, like the bush poems of the contemporaneous Bulletin School, were celebrated for being distinctly Australian in character, and by the early 20th century, critics had come to identify the movement as the beginning of an Australian tradition in Western art. Many of their major works can be seen in Australia's public galleries, including the National Gallery of Australia, the National Gallery of Victoria and the Art Gallery of New South Wales.

== History ==
The name refers to the then-rural area of Heidelberg, east of Melbourne, where practitioners of the style found their subject matter, though usage expanded to cover other Australian artists working in similar areas. The core group painted together at "artists' camps", the first being the Box Hill artists' camp, established in 1885 by Tom Roberts, Frederick McCubbin and Louis Abrahams. They were later joined by Arthur Streeton, Walter Withers, and Charles Conder. See below for a list of other associated artists.

=== 9 by 5 Impression Exhibition ===
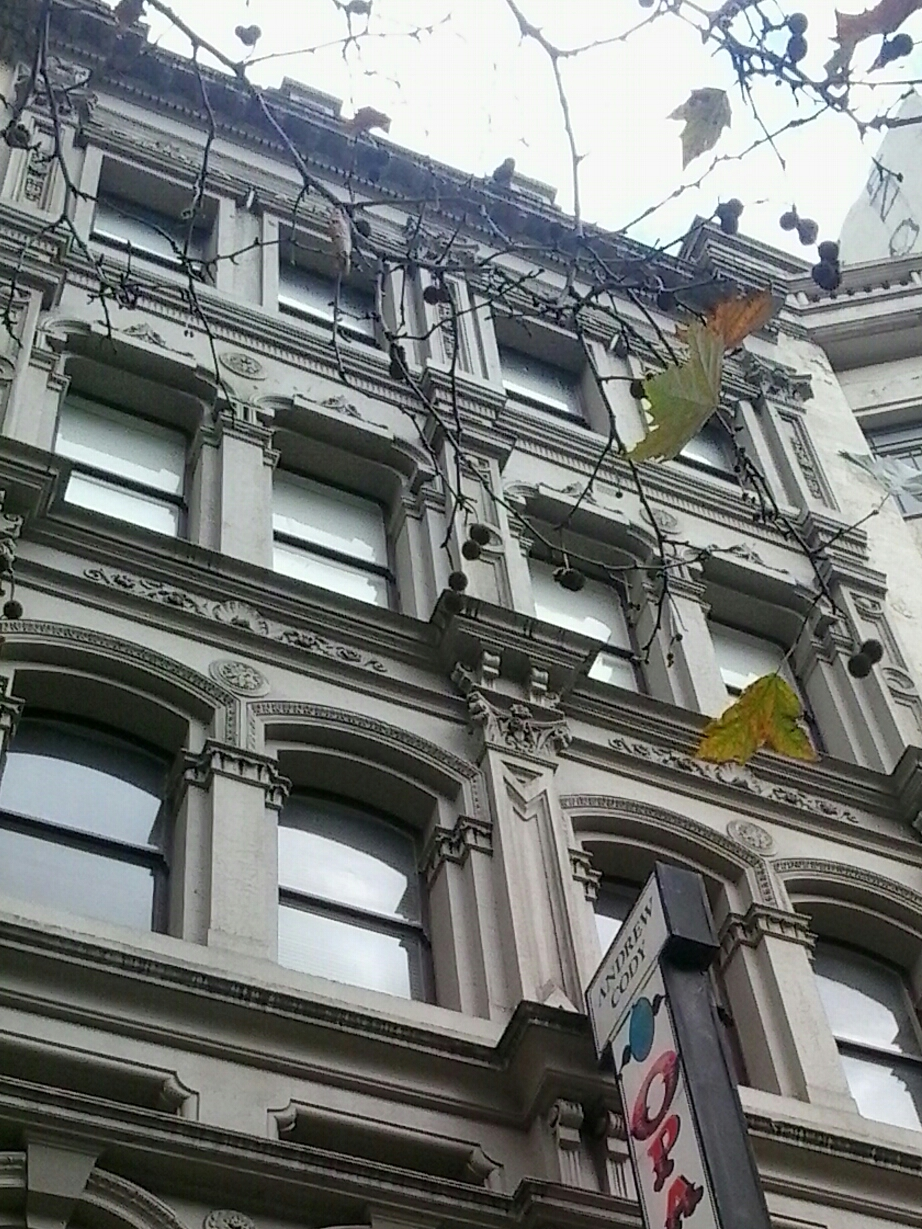
Buxton's Rooms, Swanston Street, site of the 9 by 5 Impression Exhibition

In August 1889, several artists of the Heidelberg School staged their first independent exhibition at Buxton's Rooms, Swanston Street, opposite the Melbourne Town Hall. Named the 9 by 5 Impression Exhibition, it included 183 "impressions", of which 63 were by Tom Roberts, 40 by Arthur Streeton and 46 by Charles Conder. Smaller contributions came from Frederick McCubbin and Charles Douglas Richardson, who, in addition to 19 oil paintings, included five sculpted impressions in wax and bronze. The majority of the works date from the autumn and winter of 1889 and were painted on wooden cigar-box lids, most measuring 9 by 5 inches (23 × 13 cm), hence the name of the exhibition. Louis Abrahams, a member of the Box Hill artists' camp, sourced the lids from his cigar business, Sniders & Abrahams.

In order to emphasise the small size of the paintings, the artists displayed them in broad kauri pine frames, many asymmetrical in design and left unornamented, others painted in metallic colours or decorated with verse and small sketches, giving the works an "unconventional, avant garde look". The Japonist décor they chose for Buxton's Rooms featured Japanese screens, silk draperies, umbrellas, and vases with flowers that perfumed the gallery, while background music was performed on certain afternoons. The harmony and "total effect" of the display showed the marked influence of Whistler and the broader aesthetic movement.

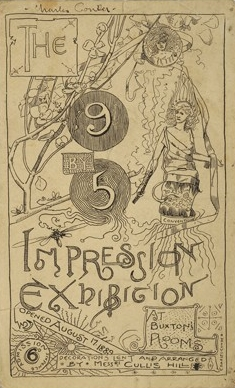
The 9 by 5 catalogue, designed by Conder, shows a female as an allegory of art being unraveled from the bandages of 'Convention'. The exhibition's theme of transience is also symbolised by falling blossoms and a dragonfly, which in folklore lives only one day.

The artists generated publicity for the exhibition through a series of calculated press interviews and articles. Intentionally provocative, they sought to challenge artistic norms and give Melbourne society "an opportunity of judging for itself what Impressionism truly is". They wrote in the catalogue:

An effect is only momentary: so an impressionist tries to find his place. Two half-hours are never alike, and he who tries to paint a sunset on two successive evenings, must be more or less painting from memory. So, in these works, it has been the object of the artists to render faithfully, and thus obtain first records of effects widely differing, and often of very fleeting character.

The exhibition caused a stir during its three-week run with Melbourne society "[flocking] to Buxton’s, hoping to be amazed, intrigued or outraged". The general public, though somewhat bemused, responded positively, and within two weeks of the opening, most of the 9 by 5s had sold. The response from critics, however, was mixed. The most scathing review came from James Smith, then Australia's foremost art critic, who said the 9 by 5s were "destitute of all sense of the beautiful" and "whatever influence [the exhibition] was likely to exercise could scarcely be otherwise than misleading and pernicious." The artists nailed the review to the entrance of the venue—attracting many more passing pedestrians to, in Streeton's words, "see the dreadful paintings"—and responded with a letter to the Editor of Smith's newspaper, The Argus. Described as a manifesto, the letter defends freedom of choice in subject and technique, concluding:

It is better to give our own idea than to get a merely superficial effect, which is apt to be a repetition of what others have done before us, and may shelter us in a safe mediocrity, which, while it will not attract condemnation, could never help towards the development of what we believe will be a great school of painting in Australia.

The 9 by 5 Impression Exhibition is now regarded as a landmark event in Australian art history. Approximately one-third of the 9 by 5s are known to have survived, many of which are held in Australia's public collections, and have sold at auction for prices exceeding $1,000,000.

==== Gallery of 9 by 5s ====
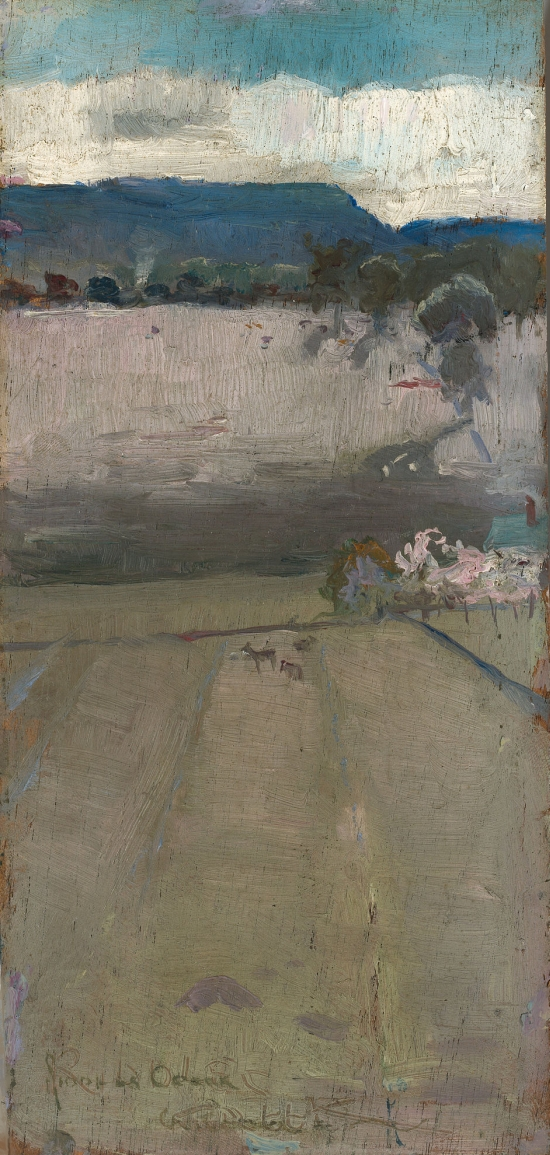
Charles Conder, Riddell's Creek, 1889

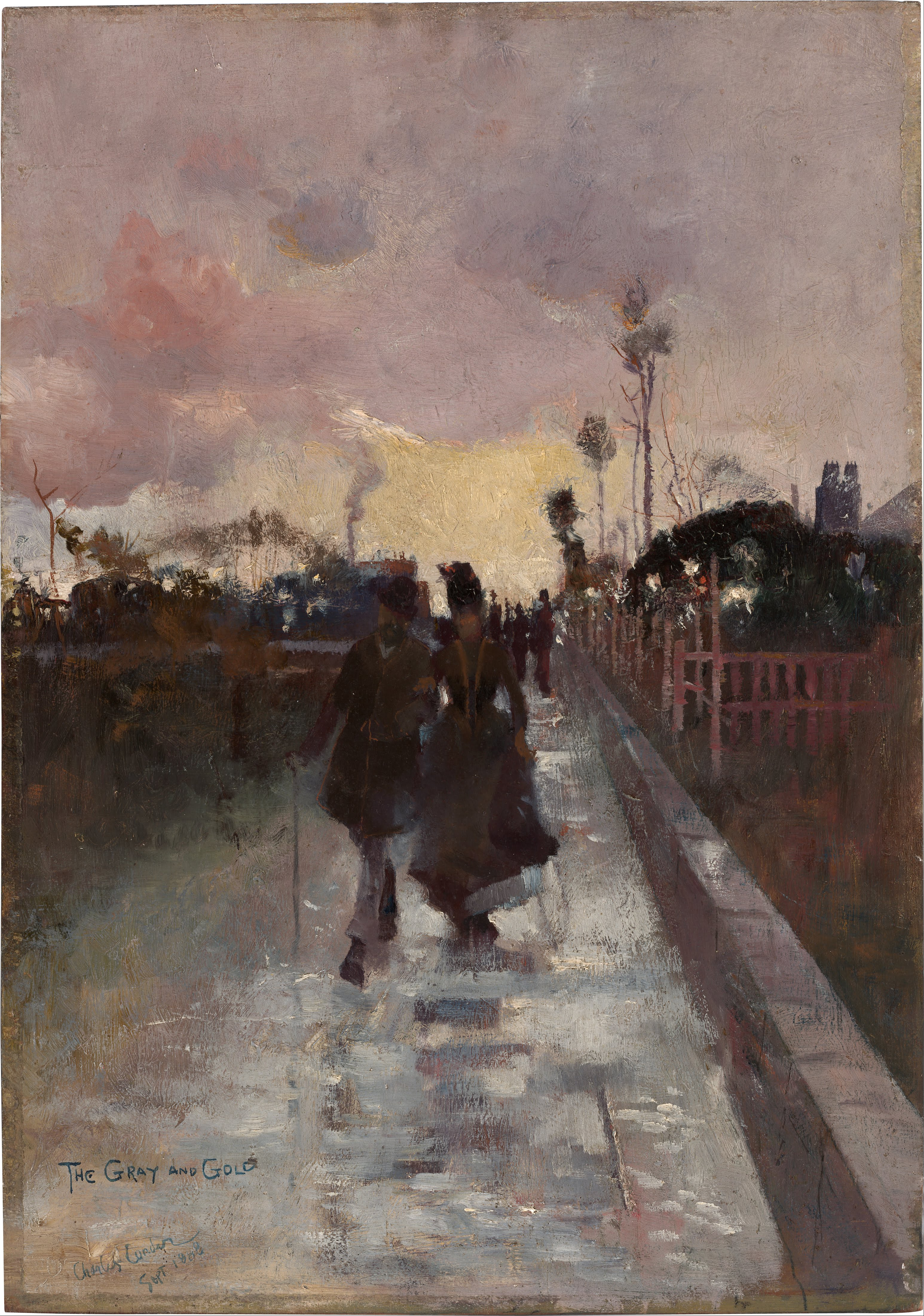
Charles Conder, Going Home (The Gray and Gold), 1889

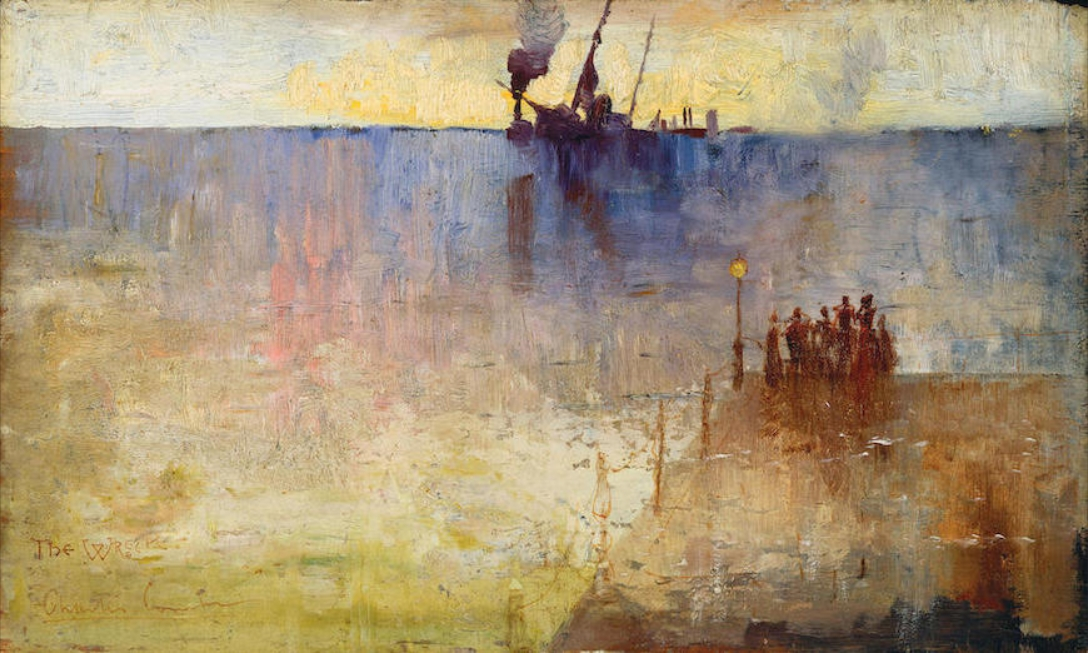
Charles Conder, The Wreck, 1889

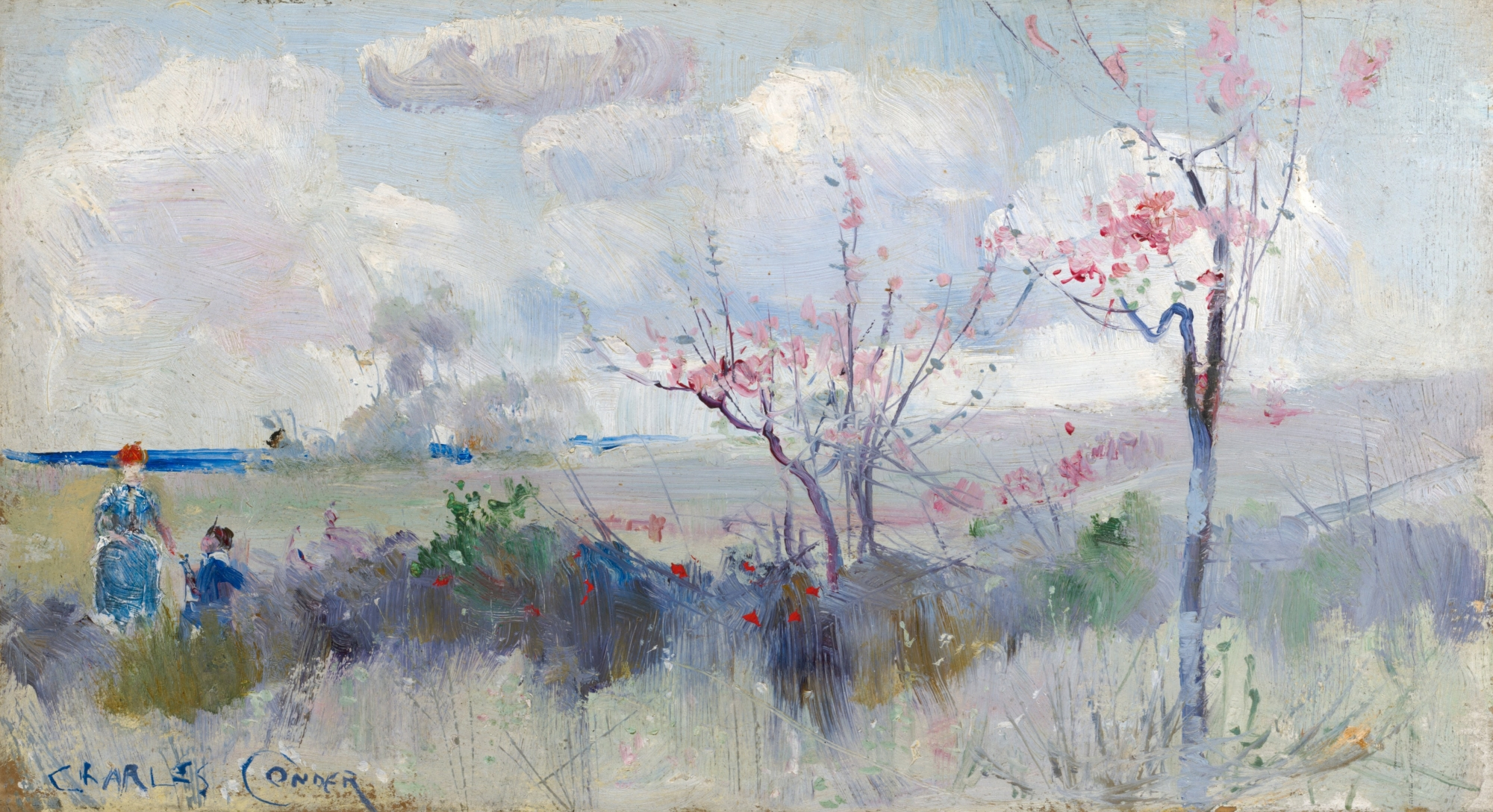
Charles Conder, Herrick's Blossoms, 1888

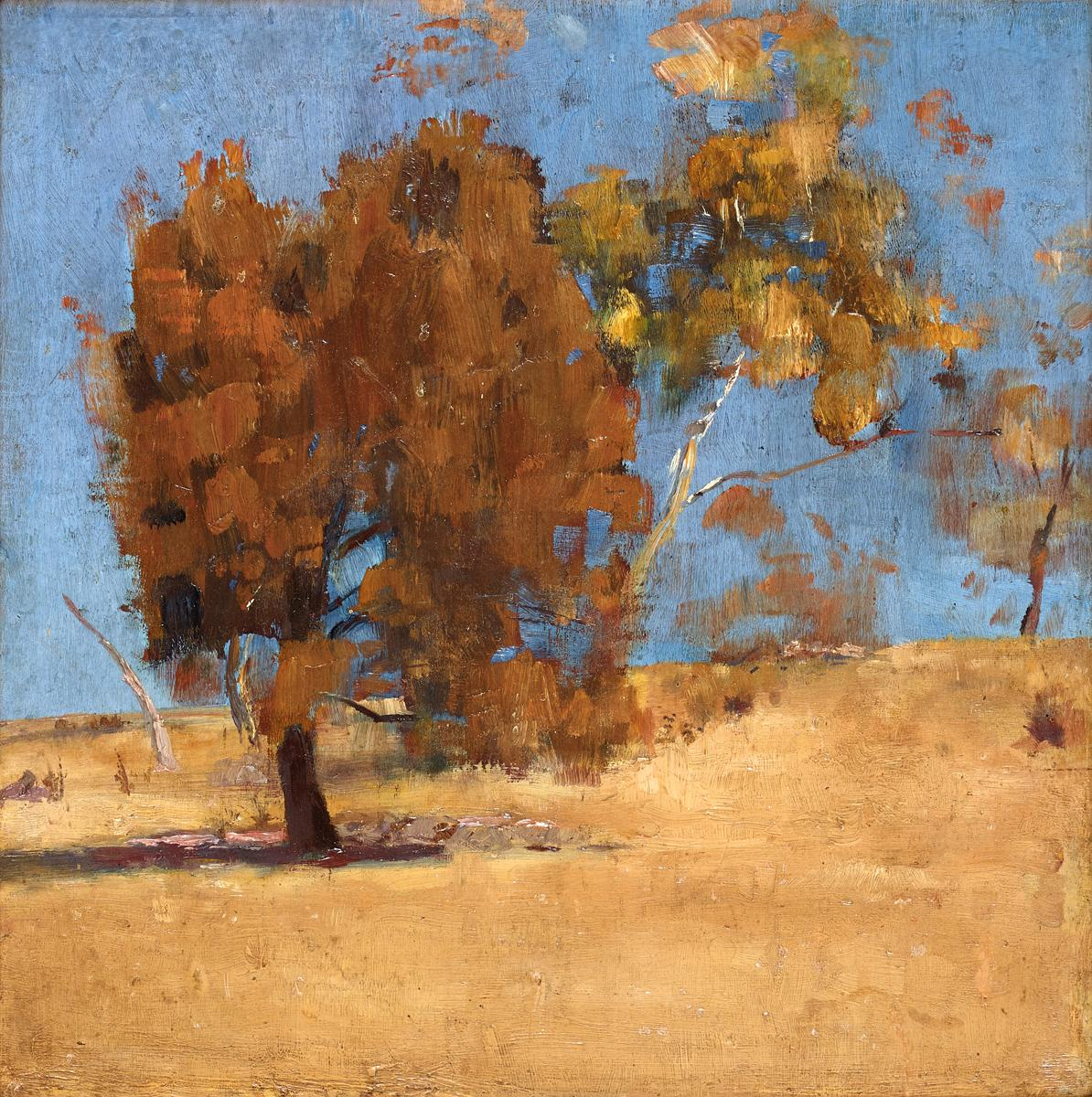
Tom Roberts, She-Oak and Sunlight, 1889

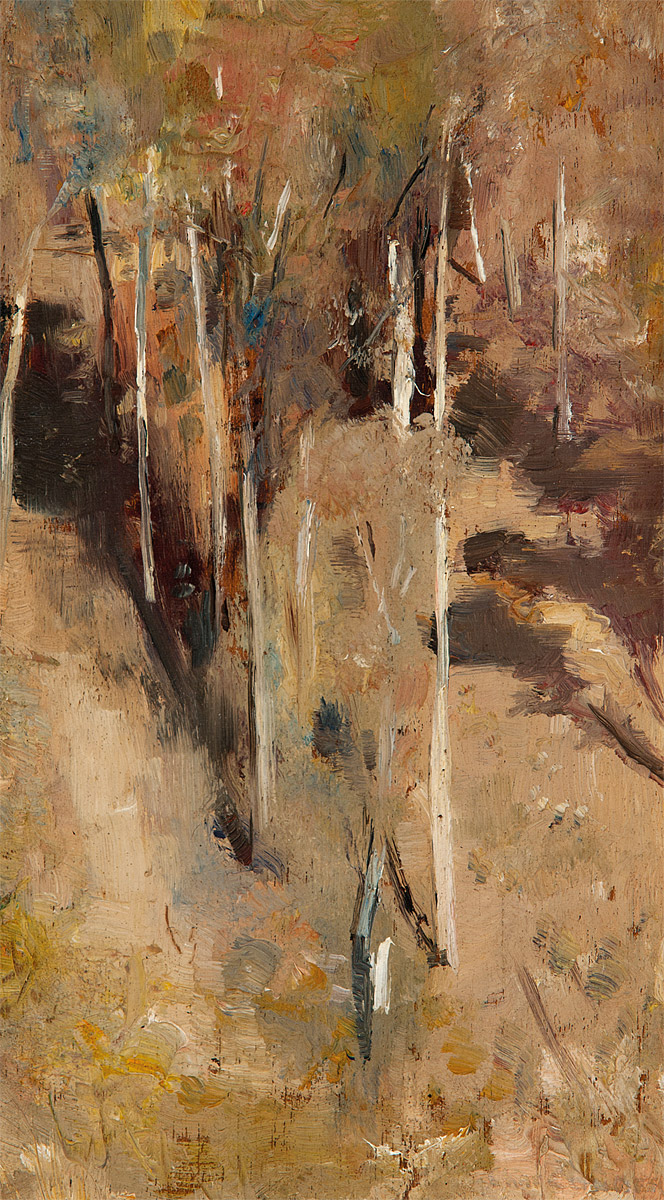
Tom Roberts, Saplings, 1889

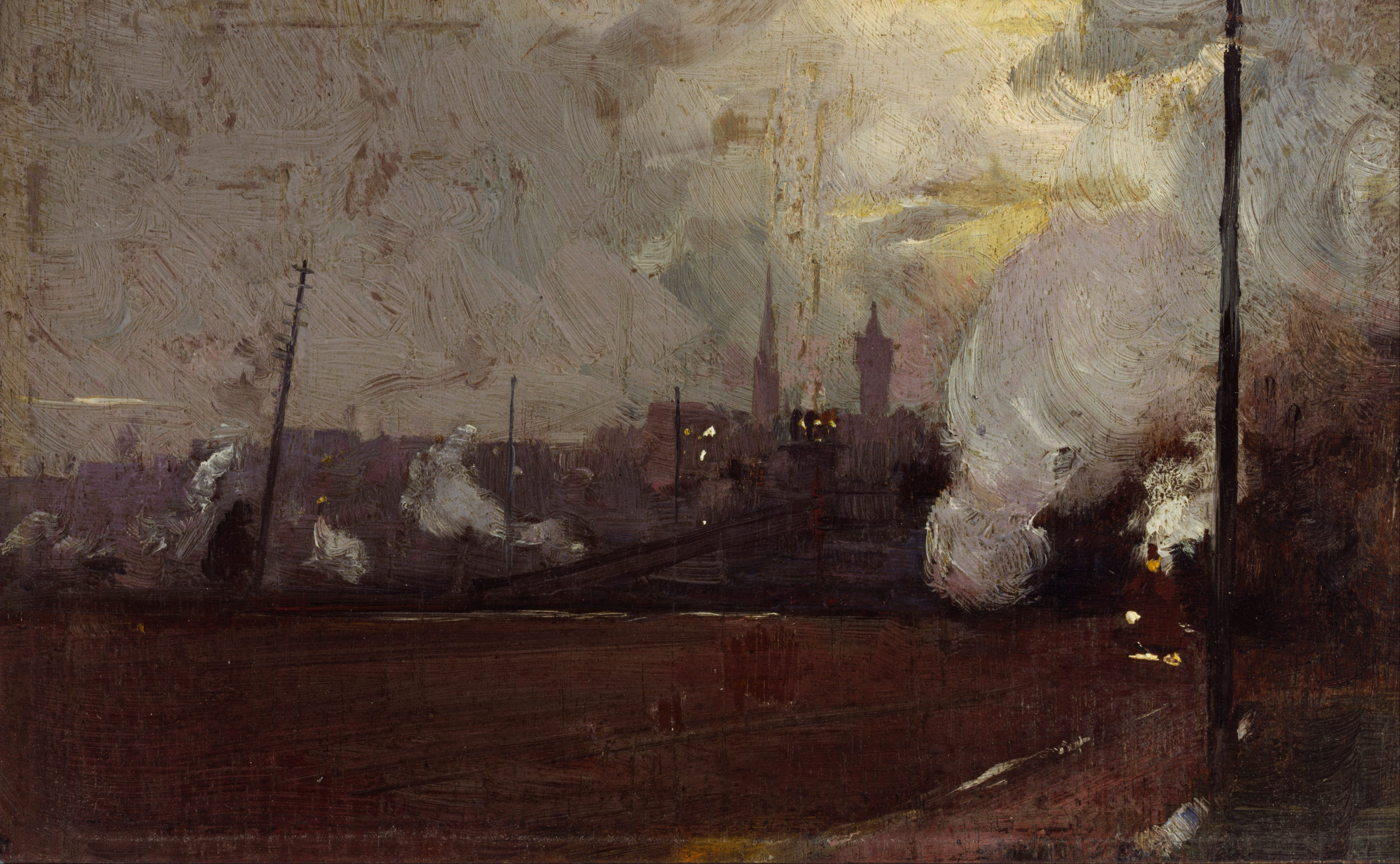
Tom Roberts, Evening Train to Hawthorn, 1889

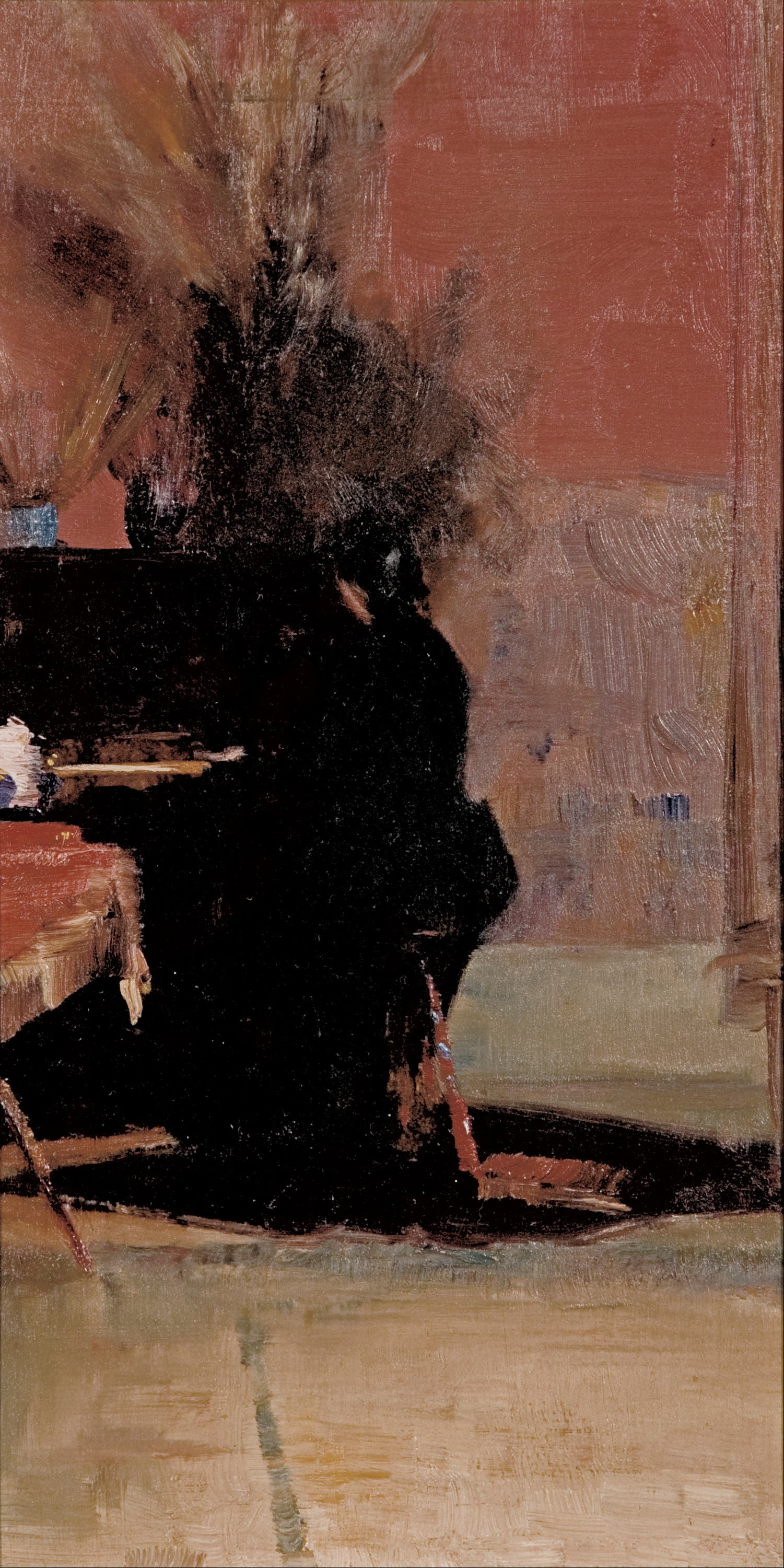
Tom Roberts, Andante, 1889

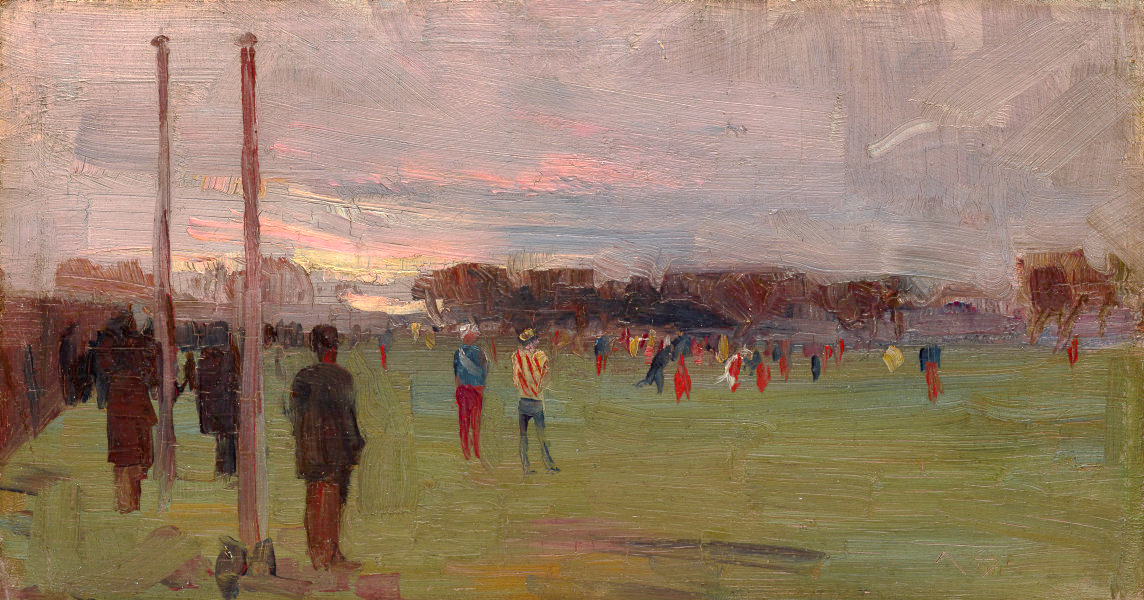
Arthur Streeton, The National Game, 1889

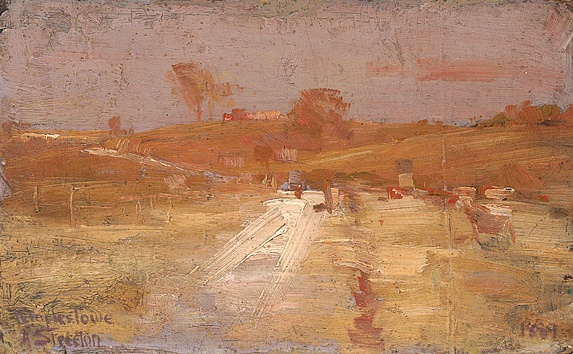
Arthur Streeton, A View of Templestowe, 1889

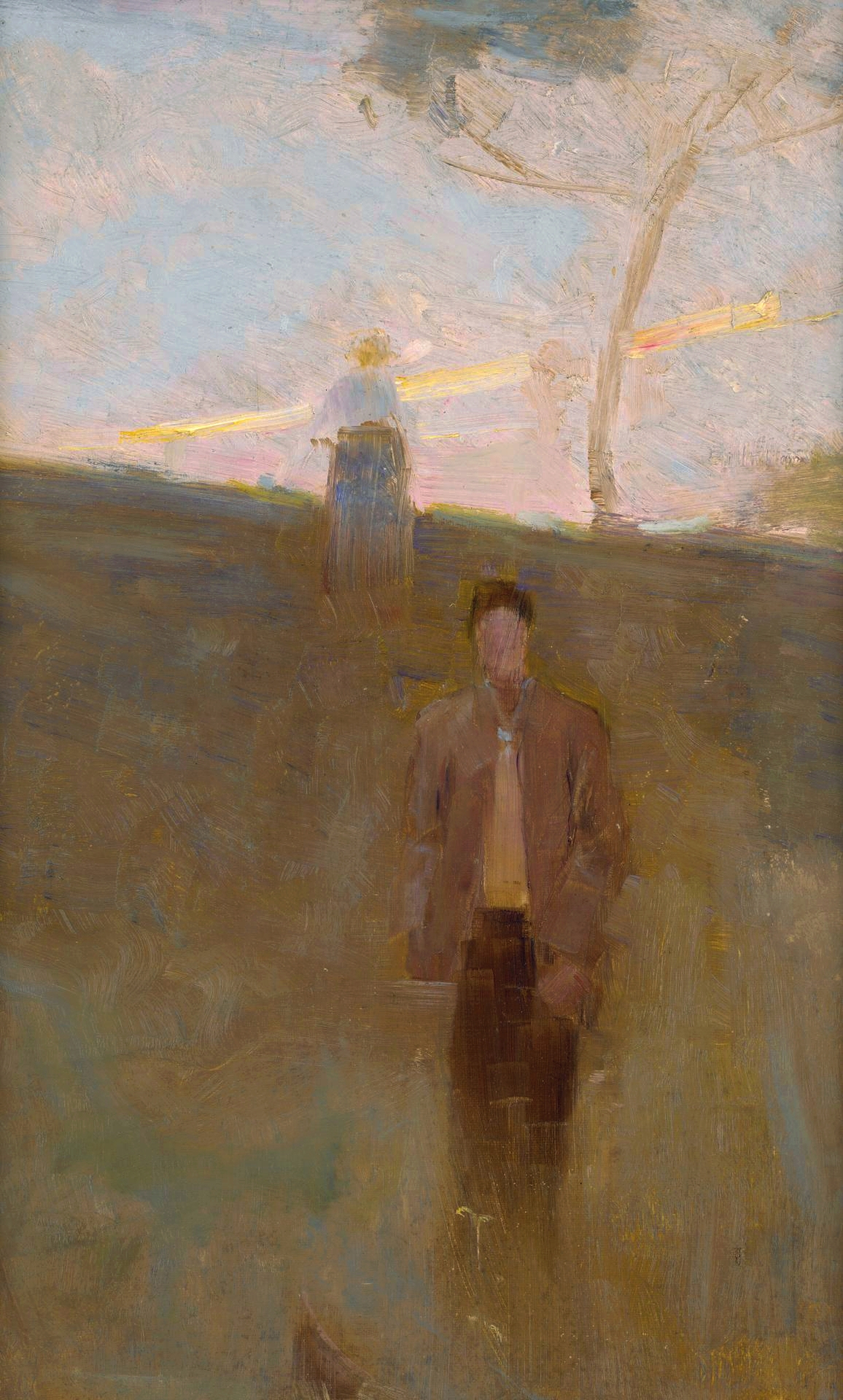
Arthur Streeton, Figures on a Hillside, Twilight, 1889

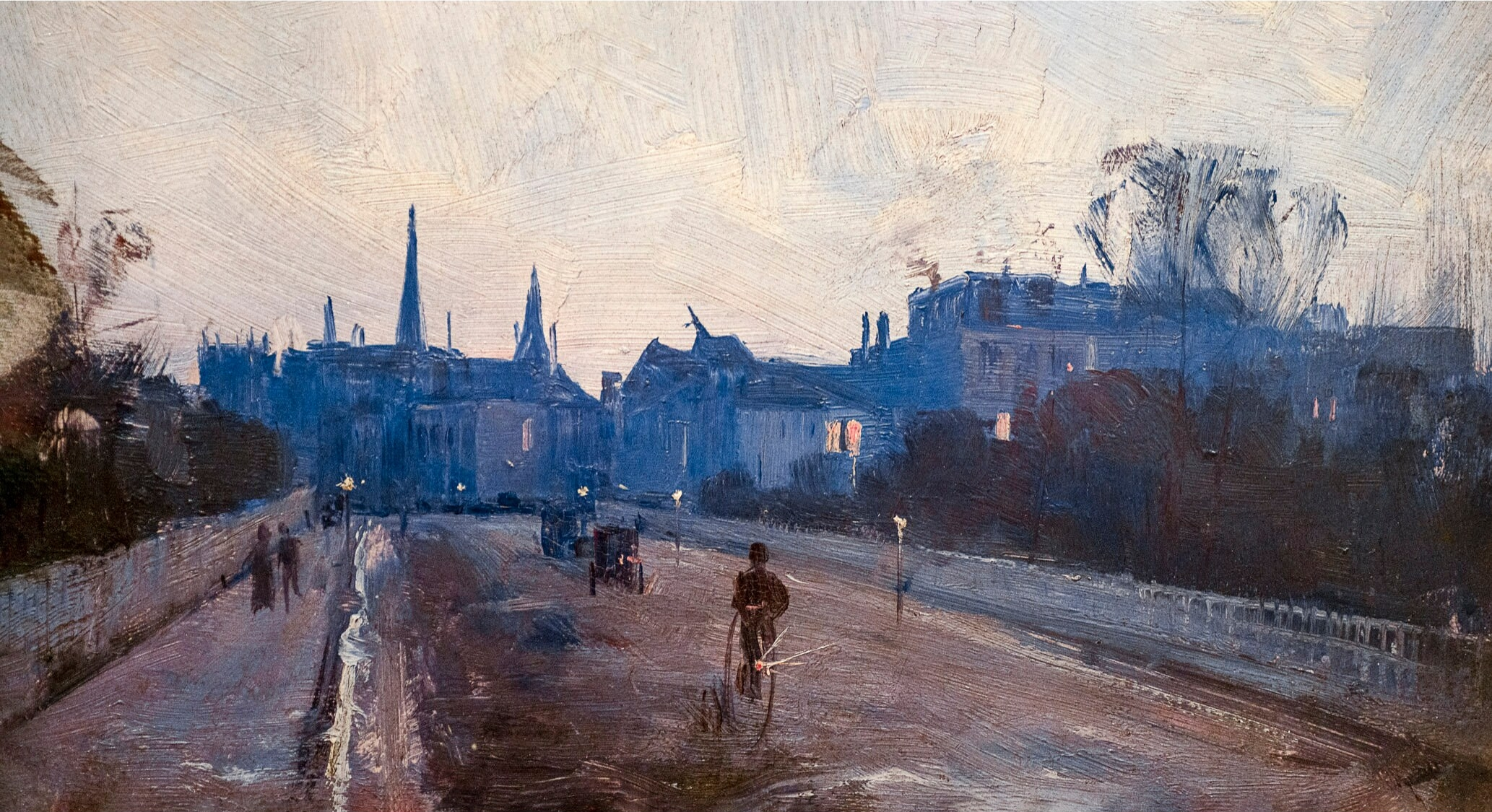
Arthur Streeton, Twilight, East Melbourne, 1889

=== Grosvenor Chambers ===
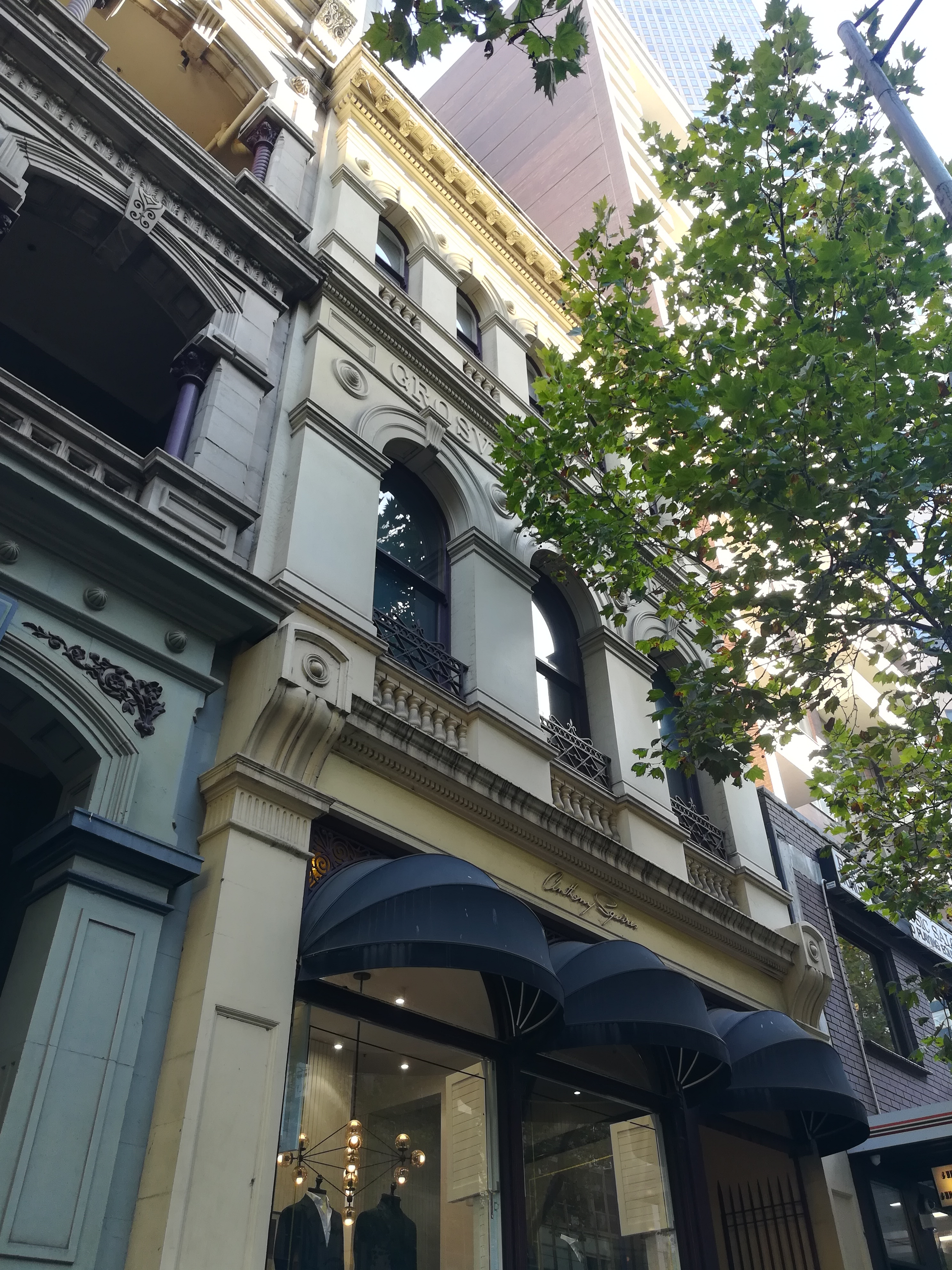
Grosvenor Chambers, Collins Street

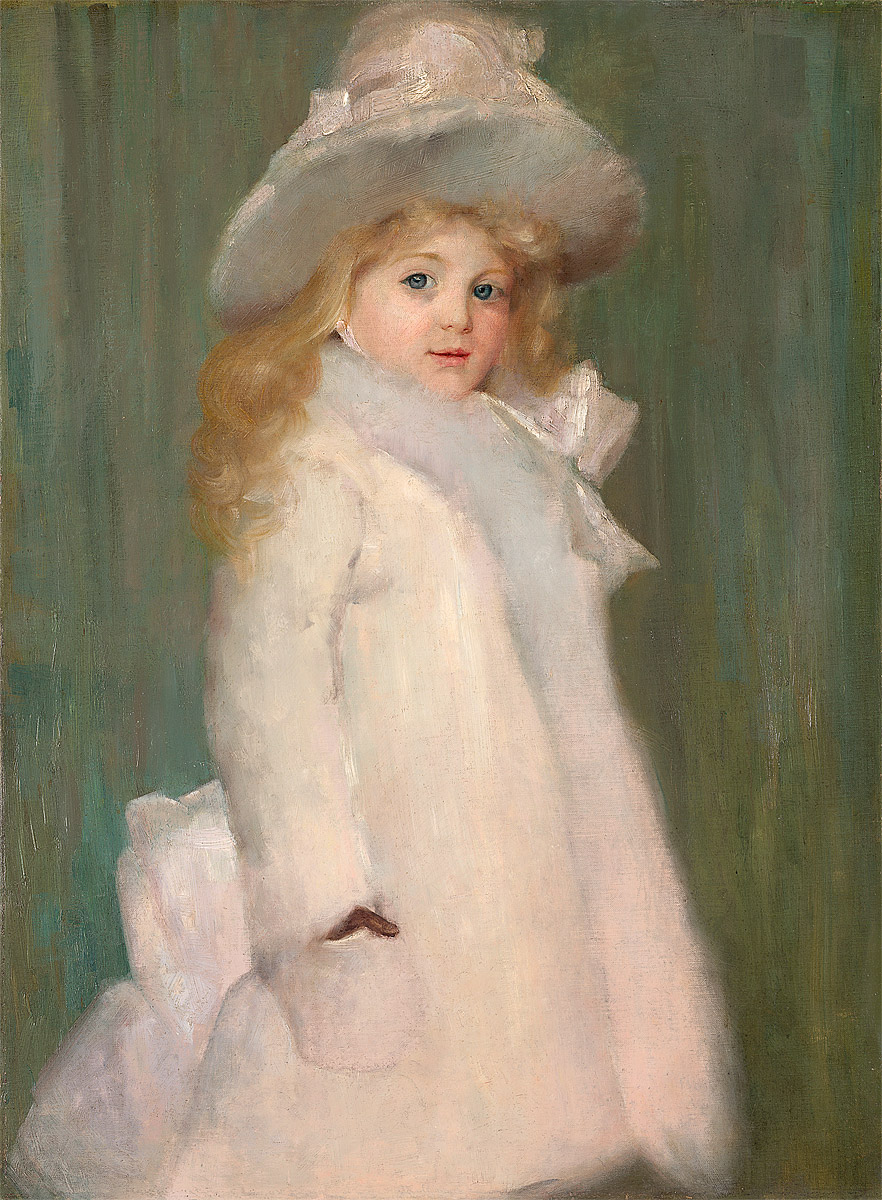
Tom Roberts, Lily Sterling, 1890

In April 1888, Grosvenor Chambers, Melbourne's first custom-built complex of artists' studios, opened at the eastern end of Collins Street. It was built by the art decorating firm Paterson Bros., established by Hugh and James Paterson, brothers of plein airist and associate of the Heidelberg School John Ford Paterson. The architects arranged the lighting and interior design of the building after consulting Roberts, who, along with Heidelberg School members Jane Sutherland and Clara Southern, was among the first artists to occupy studios in the building. Grosvenor Chambers quickly became the focal point of Melbourne's art scene, with Conder, Streeton, McCubbin, Louis Abrahams and John Mather also moving in.

The presence of Roberts, Streeton and Conder at Grosvenor Chambers accounts for the high number of urban views they included in the 9 by 5 Impression Exhibition, including Roberts' By the Treasury, painted from the vantage point of his studio and featuring the Old Treasury Building on Spring Street.

Grosvenor Chambers was used an urban base from which members of the Heidelberg School could receive sitters for portraits. It is evident from these portraits that many of the artists decorated their studios in an Aesthetic manner, showing the influence of James Abbott McNeill Whistler. Roberts' use of eucalypts and golden wattle as decorations started a fad for Australian flora in the home. He also initiated in-studio conversaziones at which artists discussed recent artistic trends and read the latest art journals.

Inspired by the success of Grosvenor Chambers, another complex of studios, Gordon Chambers, opened on Flinders Lane in 1889. Streeton, Conder and Richardson soon moved in, and in 1890, the trio staged a show of Heidelberg landscapes there in the lead up to the Victorian Artists' Society's Winter exhibition. During this period, members of the Heidelberg School began hosting simultaneous exhibitions across Grosvenor Chambers, Gordon Chambers and other nearby studios, with visitors and prospective buyers being invited to move freely between them.

=== Sydney ===
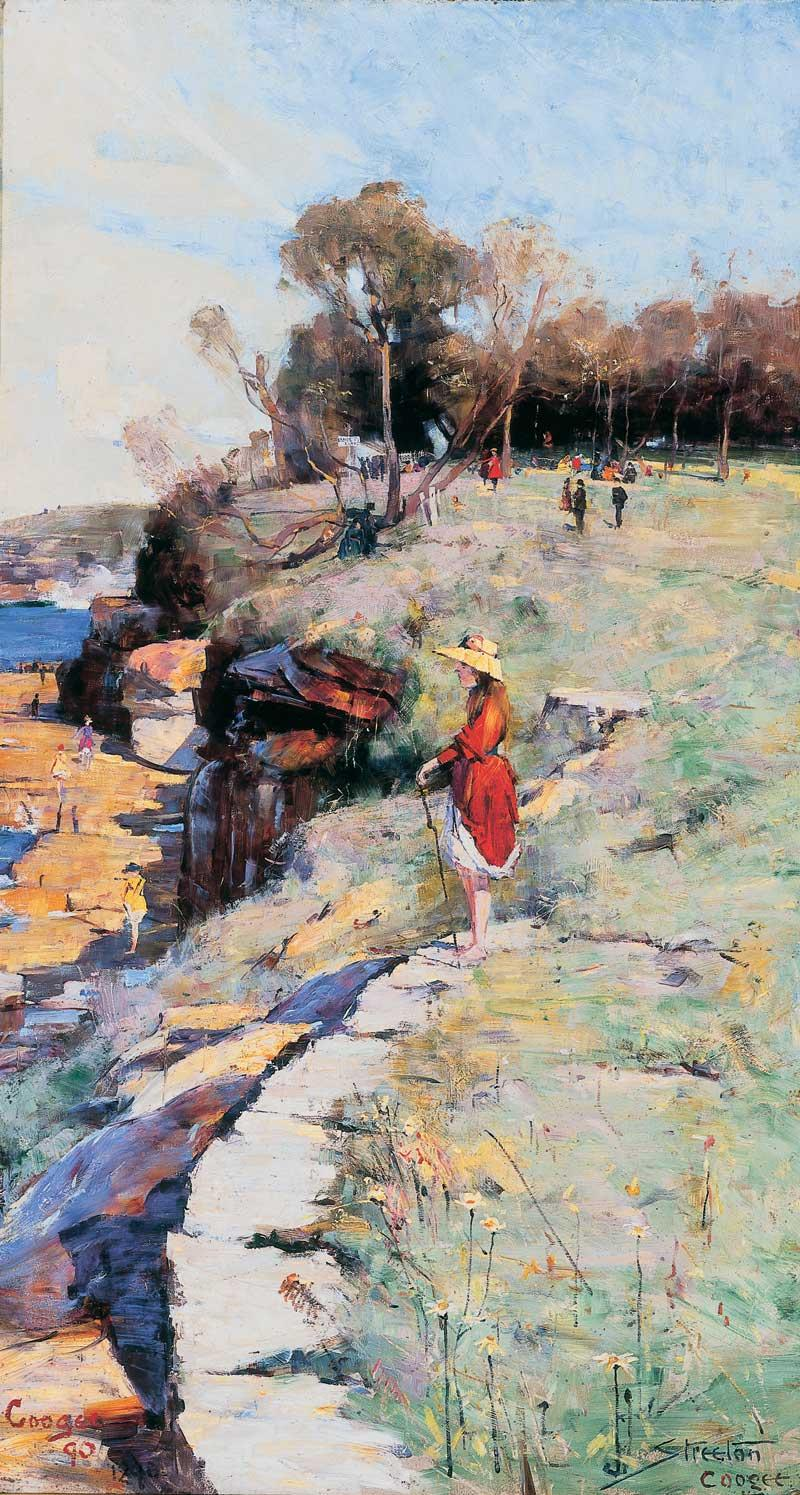
Arthur Streeton, Sunlight Sweet, Coogee, 1890

Roberts first visited Sydney in 1887. There, he developed a strong artistic friendship with Charles Conder, a young painter who had already gone on plein air excursions outside Sydney and picked up some impressionist techniques from expatriate artist G. P. Nerli. In early 1888, before Conder joined Roberts on his return trip to Melbourne, the pair painted companion works at the beachside suburb of Coogee.

When a severe economic depression hit Melbourne in 1890, Roberts and Streeton moved to Sydney, first setting up camp at Mosman Bay, a small cove of the harbour, before finally settling around the corner at Curlew Camp, which was accessible by the Mosman ferry. Melbourne artist Albert Henry Fullwood stayed with Streeton at Curlew, as well as other plen air painters on occasion, including prominent art teacher and Heidelberg School supporter Julian Ashton, who resided nearby at the Balmoral artists' camp. Ashton had earlier introduced Conder to plein air painting, and in 1890, as a trustee of the National Gallery of New South Wales in Sydney, secured the acquisition of Streeton's Heidelberg landscape ‘Still glides the stream, and shall forever glide’ (1890)—the first of the artist's works to enter a public collection. The more sympathetic patronage shown by Ashton and others in Sydney inspired more artists to make the move from Melbourne.

Streeton won acclaim in Sydney for his harbour views, many of which were collected by Eadith Walker and Howard Hinton, two of the city's leading art patrons. In a poem dedicated to the artist, composer and outspoken sensualist George Marshall-Hall declared Streeton's Sydney the "City of laughing loveliness! Sun-girdled Queen!", which became the title of one of his harbour views. The National Gallery of Victoria notes:

Sydney became Streeton's subject. The bravura of his crisp brushwork and his trademark blue, the blue that he had used at Heidelberg, were perfectly suited to registering images of the bustling activity on Sydney's blue harbour.

From Sydney, Streeton, Roberts and Fullwood branched out into country New South Wales, where, in the early 1890s, they painted some of their most celebrated works.

=== Second phase ===
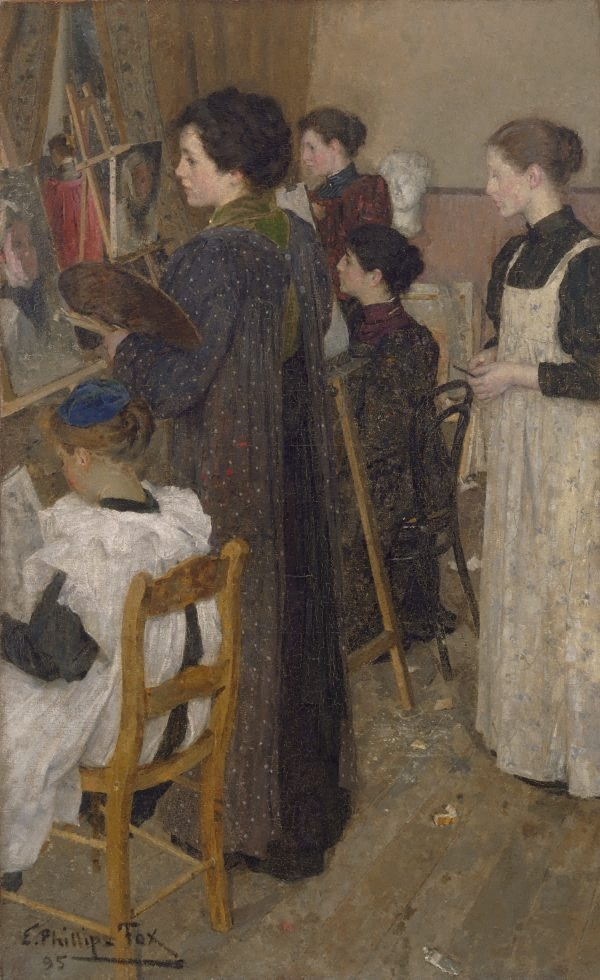
E. Phillips Fox, Art Students, 1895

By the early 1890s, the golden era of the Heidelberg School had come to an end as several leading members pursued more individual paths. Conder moved to Europe, where he became a legendary figure of the fin de siècle, mixing within the social circles of Oscar Wilde and Aubrey Beardsley, and frequenting Parisian bohemian districts with the likes of Henri de Toulouse-Lautrec. Streeton continued to work primarily in and around Sydney until 1897, when he too moved to Europe, settling in London. Roberts followed a few years later. The artists maintained correspondence and, when recalling the Heidelberg School period, often did so with intense feelings of nostalgia. Conder wrote to Roberts:

Give me one summer again, with yourself and Streeton, the same long evenings, songs, dirty plates, and last pink skies. But these things don't happen, do they? And what's gone is over.

Back in Melbourne, McCubbin, Withers, Paterson, Sutherland, Leon Pole and Tom Humphrey continued to work en plein air in and around Heidelberg. From 1890, Charterisville, a rural property in neighbouring East Ivanhoe, became the favoured hub of many of these artists. They were soon joined by younger Australians such as David Davies and E. Phillips Fox, who, during their studies in France, had picked up impressionist techniques and visited artists' colonies. Throughout the 1890s, Fox and Tudor St. George Tucker ran the Melbourne School of Art at Charterisville, teaching plein airism and impressionist techniques to a new generation of artists, including Ina Gregory, Violet Teague and Hugh Ramsay.

== Influences and style ==
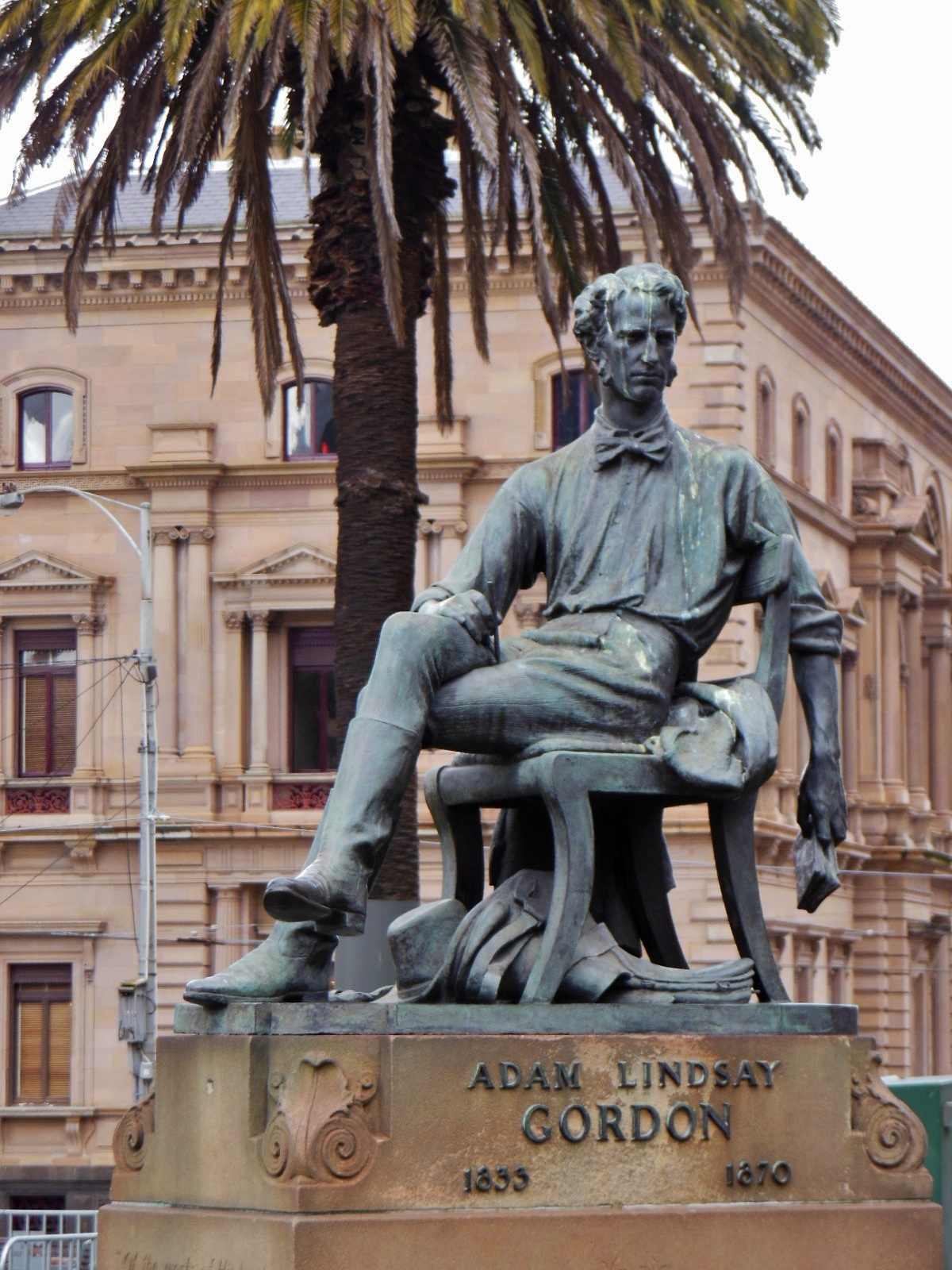
Statue in Melbourne of poet Adam Lindsay Gordon, a literary source of inspiration for the Heidelberg School

Like many of their contemporaries in Europe and North America, the Heidelberg School artists adopted a direct and impressionistic style of painting. They were committed plein airists who sought to depict daily life, showed a keen interest in transient light and its effect on colour, and experimented with loose brushwork. Art critics such as Robert Hughes have noted that their "impressionism" was closer to Whistler's tonal impressionism than the broken colours of the French impressionists. Indeed, the Heidelberg School artists did not espouse any colour theory, and, like another main influence of theirs, Jules Bastien-Lepage, often maintained a realist sense of form, clarity and composition. They also sometimes created works within the narrative conventions of both Victorian and history painting, and made occasional use of symbolist imagery. Much of what they knew of French impressionism was through correspondence with painter John Russell, an Australian expatriate in France who befriended, and painted alongside the likes of Vincent van Gogh and Claude Monet. Encouraged by Russell, John Longstaff, a peripheral figure of the Heidelberg School, temporarily adopted French impressionist methods. Streeton however opined that they were overly technical "ways and means" that interrupted the spontaneous act of painting. Conder, when in France in the early 1890s, admired Monet's work but considered French impressionism on the whole "ultra [extremist]". It was not until 1907 that McCubbin saw their works in person, which encouraged his evolution towards brighter colours and a more abstracted style.

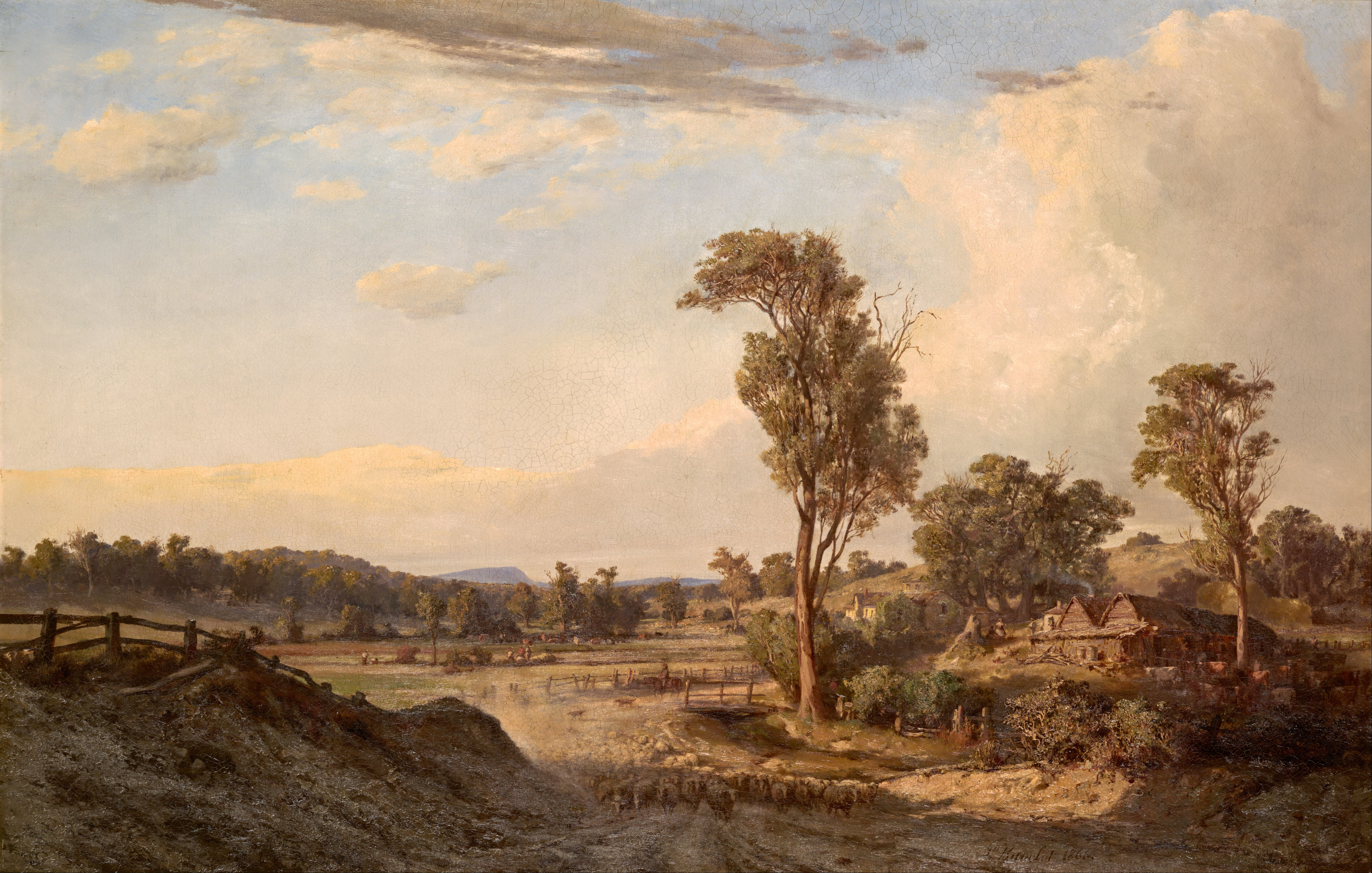
Summer Afternoon, Templestowe. The landscapes of early Melbourne artist Louis Buvelot were particularly influential on the Heidelberg School.

The Heidelberg School painters were not merely following an international trend, but "were interested in making paintings that looked distinctly Australian". They greatly admired the light-infused landscapes of Louis Buvelot, a Swiss-born artist and art teacher who, in the 1860s, adapted French Barbizon School principles to the countryside around Melbourne. Regarding Buvelot as "the father of Australian landscape painting", they showed little interest in the works of earlier colonial artists, which they likened to European scenes that did not reflect Australia's harsh sunlight, earthier colours and distinctive vegetation. The Heidelberg School painters spoke of seeing Australia "through Australian eyes", and by 1889, Roberts argued that they had successfully developed "a distinct and vital and creditable style". Likewise Streeton, when told in 1896 that his paintings were French in style, claimed that his work "is purely and absolutely Australian, not only as regards colour, but in idea and expression".

Beyond the visual arts, the Heidelberg School also took inspiration from Australian literature. They responded strongly to poet Adam Lindsay Gordon's emotional, sensorial evocations of the Australian landscape, both illustrating his work directly and using it as the basis for the titles of other paintings. Owing to shared themes and nationalist sentiments, the Heidelberg School is often described as painting's counterpart to the contemporaneous Bulletin School of bush poetry, centered around the journal The Bulletin and numbering Henry Lawson and Banjo Paterson among its members.

== Associated artists ==
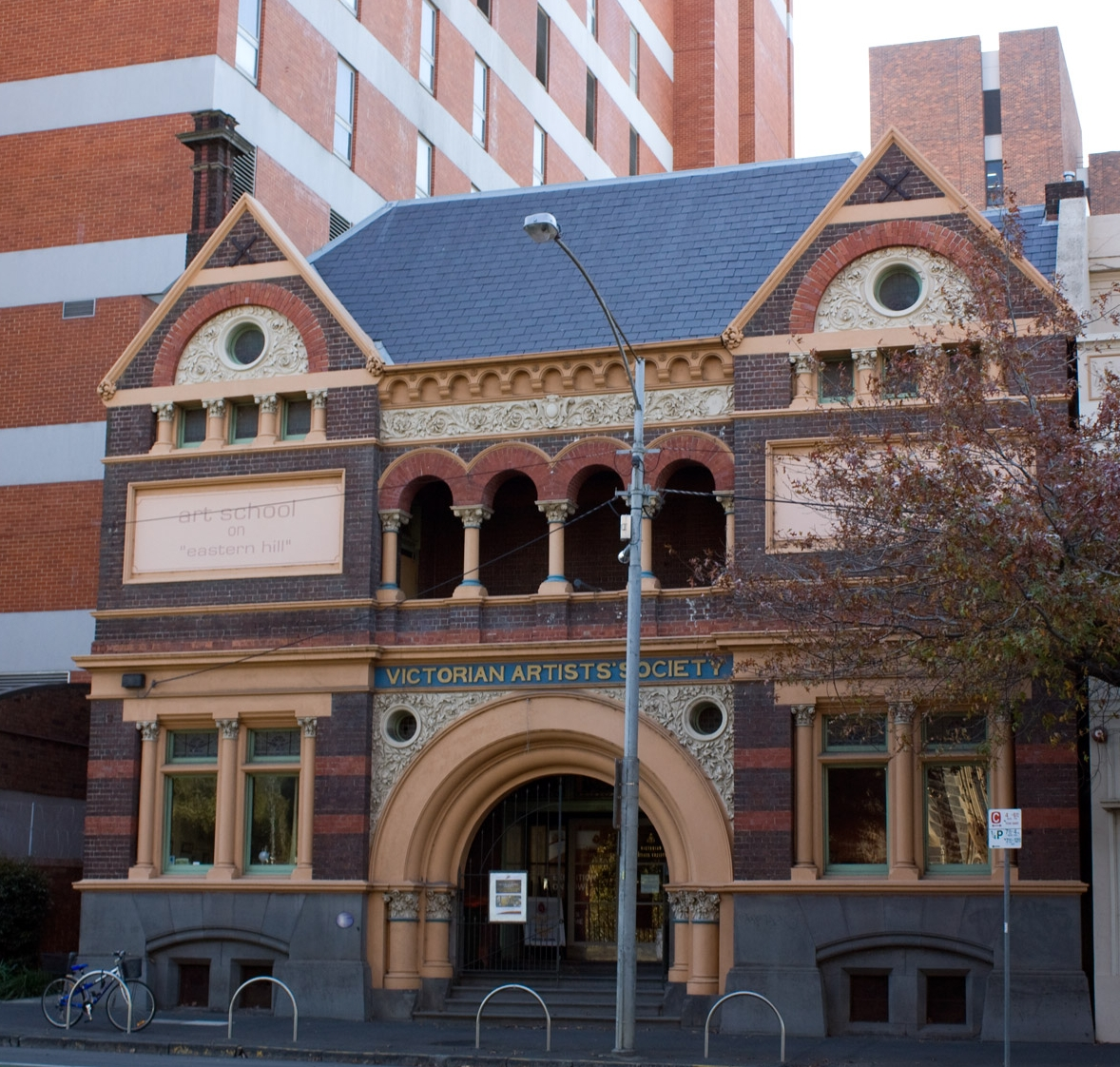
The Victorian Artists' Society in East Melbourne

They may be said to form a little school in themselves; and to have come to an agreement to look at Nature with the same eyes, and to interpret what they see by the same methods.

— The Argus reviewing the Victorian Artists' Society's 1890 winter exhibition

The Heidelberg School had no official membership, but artists are said to be part of the movement based on their adoption of plein airism and impressionist techniques, as well as their attendance at Melbourne and Sydney's "artists' camps". Many trained together at the National Gallery of Victoria Art School and were active members of both the bohemian artists' society the Buonarotti Club and the Victorian Artists' Society, where they staged group exhibitions. Notable figure associated with the movement include:

- Louis Abrahams
- Julian Ashton
- Charles Conder
- David Davies
- Emanuel Phillips Fox
- Ethel Carrick Fox
- Florence Fuller
- Albert Henry Fullwood
- Ina Gregory
- Tom Humphrey
- John Llewellyn Jones
- John Mather
- Frederick McCubbin
- John Ford Paterson
- Leon Pole
- Jane Price
- Charles Douglas Richardson
- Tom Roberts
- Arthur Streeton
- Clara Southern
- Jane Sutherland
- Tudor St. George Tucker
- May Vale
- Walter Withers

== Locations ==
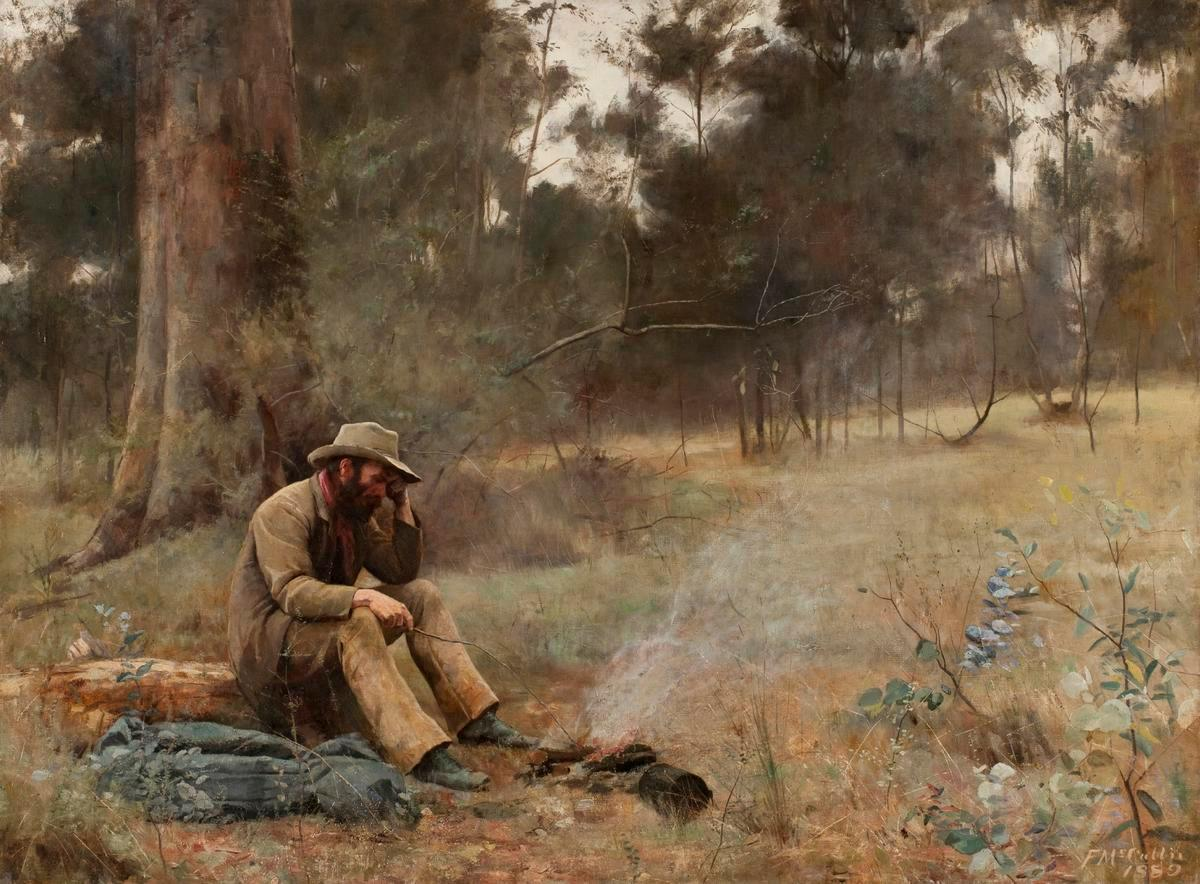
Frederick McCubbin, Down on His Luck (1889), painted at the Box Hill artists' camp

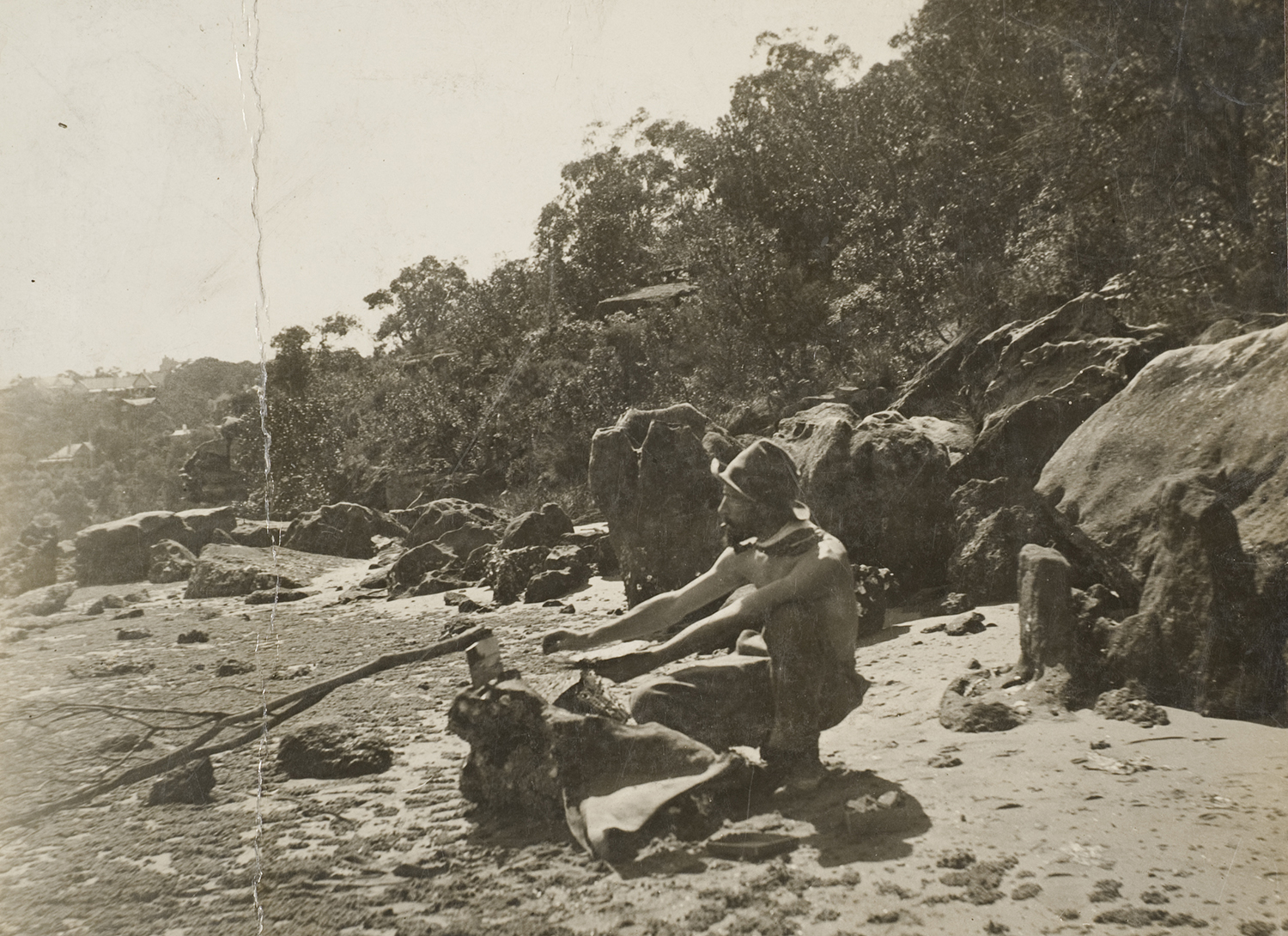
Streeton painting en plein air at Curlew Camp, Sydney Harbour

- Heidelberg
- Beaumaris
- Blackburn
- Box Hill (see Box Hill artists' camp)
- Bulleen
- Templestowe
- Warrandyte
- Eltham
- Research
- Diamond Creek
- Ferntree Gully
- Kallista
- Olinda
- Mount Dandenong
- Kalorama
- Silvan
- Lilydale
- Yarra Glen
- Coldstream
- Yering
- Mentone
- Sydney artists' camps

== Legacy ==
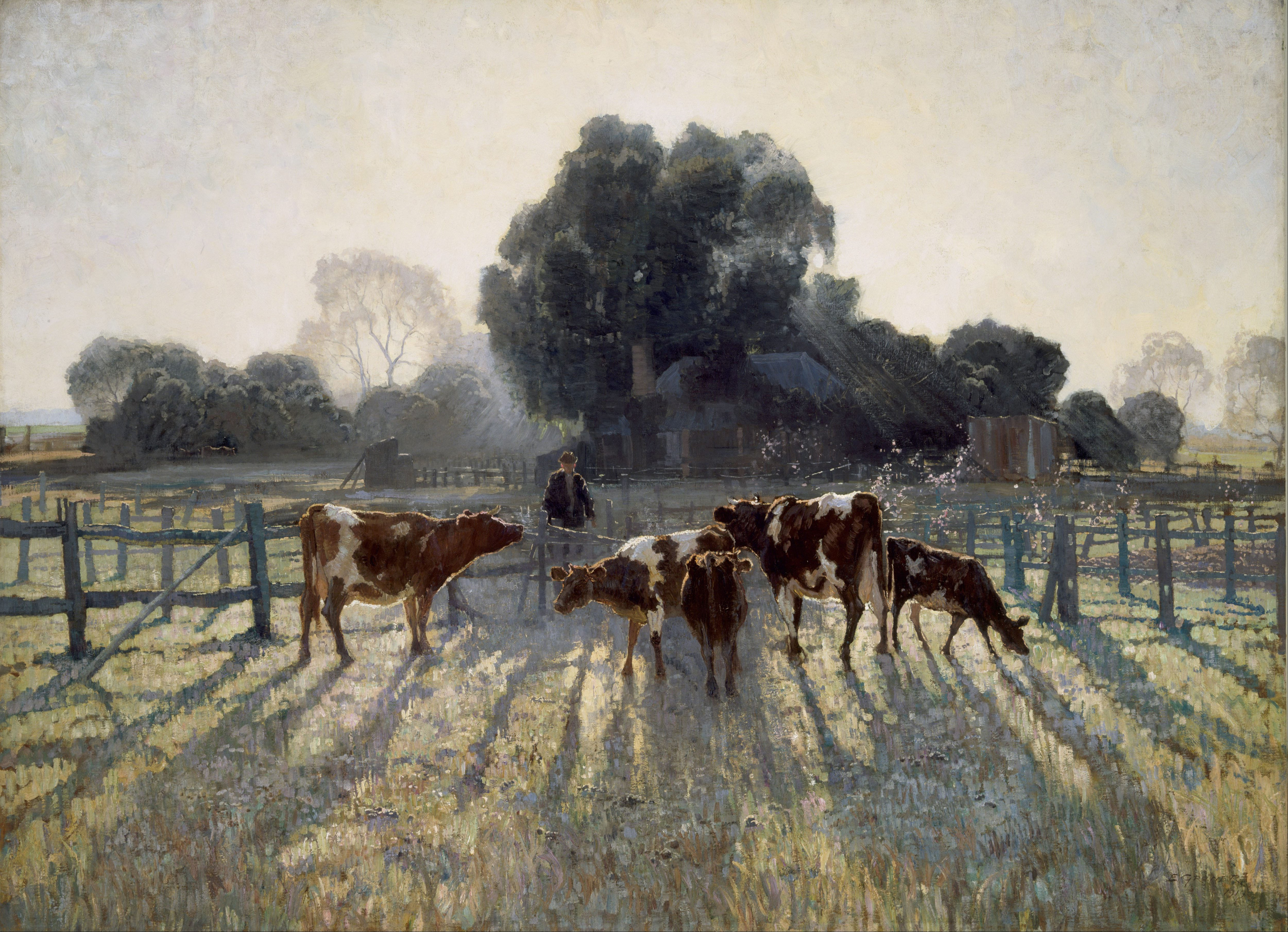
Spring Frost (1919) by Elioth Gruner, often regarded as "the last of the Australian impressionists".

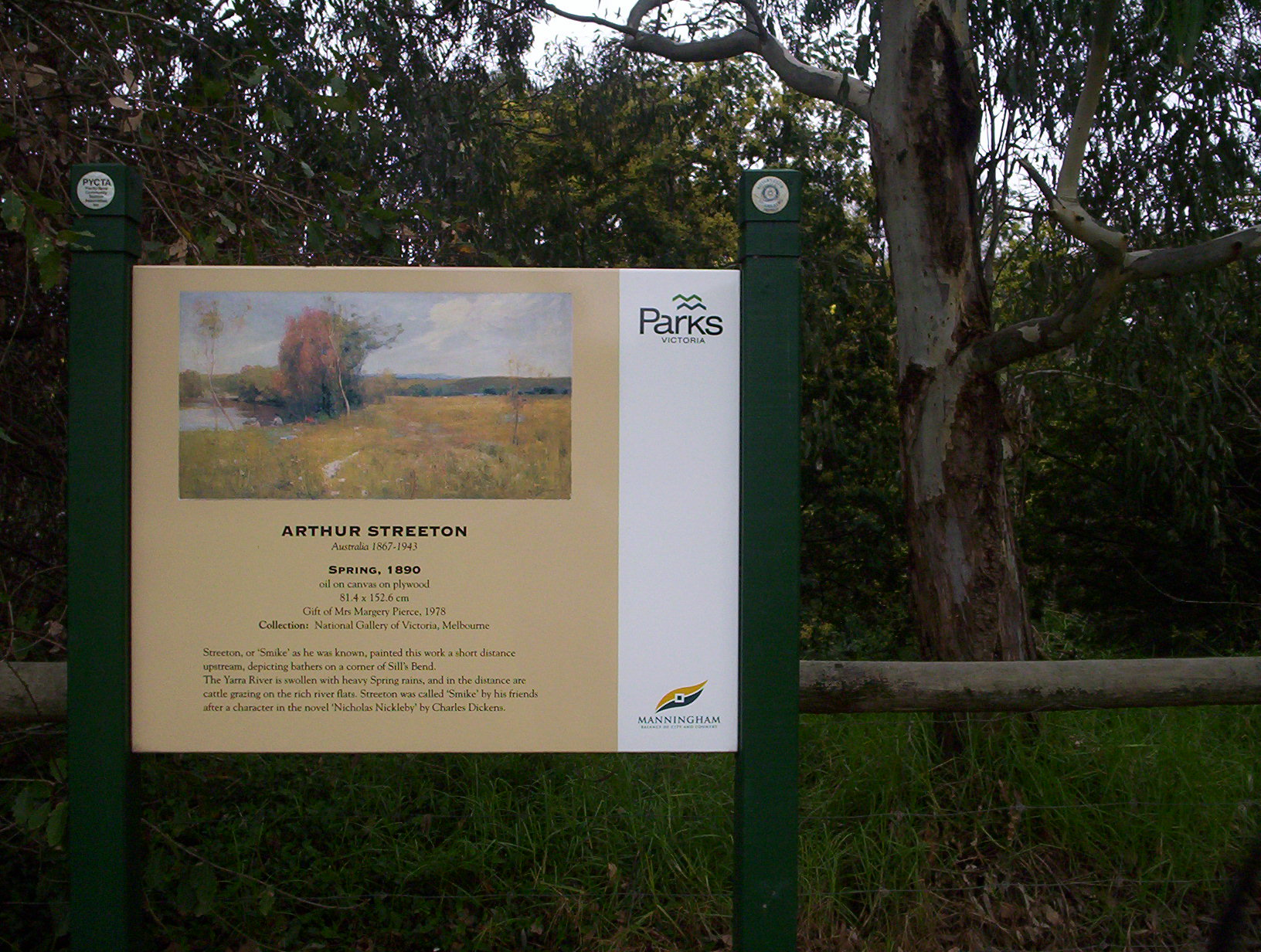
One of the many signs along the Heidelberg Artists Trail, marking the approximate location where a particular painting was created

In his seminal work The Story of Australian Art (1934), art historian William Moore referred to the Heidelberg School as "the golden age of landscape painting in Australia". By this time, Australia's leading art institutions had fully embraced the movement's style and pastoral vision, while simultaneously shunning the modernist innovations of more recent Australian artists, such as Clarice Beckett, Roy De Maistre and Grace Cossington Smith. Even until the early 1940s, winning entries of the prestigious Wynne Prize, awarded annually by the Art Gallery of New South Wales for "the best landscape painting of Australian scenery", "invariably depicted the gum trees, sunlight and rural scene as developed by Streeton and Roberts". Heidelberg School member Walter Withers won the inaugural Wynne Prize in 1897 with The Storm, and leading successors of the movement, Elioth Gruner and Hans Heysen, went on to win a record seven and nine times, respectively. According to Robert Hughes, the Heidelberg School tradition "ossified" during this period into a rigid academic system and an unimaginative national style prolonged by what he called its "zombie acolytes". The federation of Australia in 1901, followed by World War I and the Great Depression, are seen to have contributed to the enduring popularity of their work. In the 1920s and 30s in particular, it offered comfort to Australians still reeling from the war, as it depicted a "pastoral utopia" that was "eminently worth defending even unto death".

Writing in 1980, Australian artist and scholar Ian Burn described the Heidelberg School as "mediating the relation to the bush of most people growing up in Australia. ... Perhaps no other local imagery is so much a part of an Australian consciousness and ideological make-up." Their works are known to many Australians through reproductions, adorning stamps, the walls of bars and motels, and the covers of paperback copies of colonial literature. Heidelberg School artworks are among the most collectible in Australian art; in 1995, the National Gallery of Australia acquired Streeton's Golden Summer, Eaglemont (1889) from a private owner for $3.5 million, then a record price for an Australian painting. McCubbin's Bush Idyll (1893) briefly held the record price for a publicly auctioned Australian painting when it sold at Christie's in 1998 for $2.31 million.

The movement featured in the Australian citizenship test, overseen by former prime minister John Howard in 2007. Such references to history were removed the following year, instead focusing on "the commitments in the pledge rather than being a general knowledge quiz about Australia."

=== Influence on Australian cinema ===
Many period films of the Australian New Wave drew upon the visual style and subject matter of the Heidelberg School. For Picnic at Hanging Rock (1975), director Peter Weir studied the Heidelberg School as a basis for art direction, lighting, and composition. Sunday Too Far Away (1975), set on an outback sheep station, pays homage to Roberts' shearing works, to the extent that Shearing the Rams is recreated within the film. When shooting the landscape in The Chant of Jimmie Blacksmith (1978), cinematographer Ian Baker tried to "make every shot a Tom Roberts". The Getting of Wisdom (1977) and My Brilliant Career (1979) each found inspiration in the Heidelberg School; outback scenes in the latter allude directly to works by Streeton, such as The Selector's Hut. The movement is explored in One Summer Again, a three-part docudrama that first aired on ABC television in 1985. The series' depiction of the landscape was described by one critic as having "the soft warmth of a McCubbin painting".

=== Retrospective exhibitions ===
The Heidelberg School has been surveyed in major exhibitions, including the nationwide blockbuster Golden Summers: Heidelberg and Beyond (1986), and Australian Impressionism (2007), held at the National Gallery of Victoria. Inspired by their acquisition of Streeton's 1890 painting Blue Pacific, the National Gallery in London hosted an exhibition titled Australia's Impressionists between December 2016 and March 2017, focusing on works by Streeton, Roberts, Conder and John Russell, an Australian impressionist based in Europe. In 2021, from April to August, the National Gallery of Victoria hosted the exhibition She-Oak and Sunlight: Australian Impressionism.

=== Historiography and revisionist critiques ===
The notion that the Heidelberg School painters were the first to objectively capture Australia's "scrubby bush" gained widespread acceptance in the early 20th century, but has since been disputed; for example, in the 1960s art historian Bernard Smith identified "an authentic bush atmosphere" in John Lewin's landscapes of the 1810s, and John Glover in the 1830s is seen to have faithfully rendered Australia's unique light and sprawling, untidy gum trees. Another longstanding assumption has been that the Heidelberg School was groundbreaking in its choice of local themes and subjects, creating a nationalistic iconography centered on shearers, drovers, swagmen, and other rural figures. Such images had already become entrenched in Australian popular culture through the black-and-white art of The Bulletin and other illustrated periodicals. The pictorial tradition of the bushman can be traced back to S. T. Gill and other artists of the 1850s gold rushes, and reached its apotheosis with The Picturesque Atlas of Australasia (1886–88).

== Gallery ==
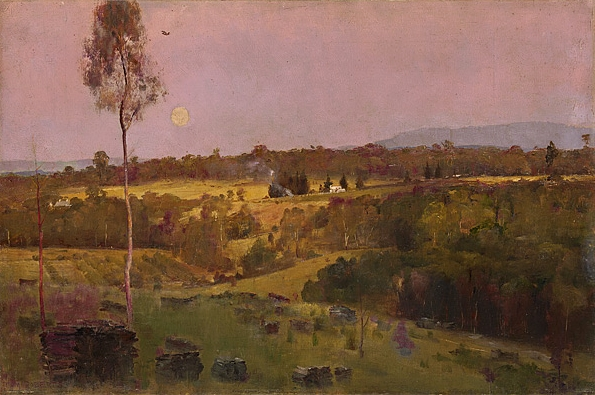
Tom Roberts, ‘Evening, when the quiet east flushes faintly at the sun's last look’, 1887

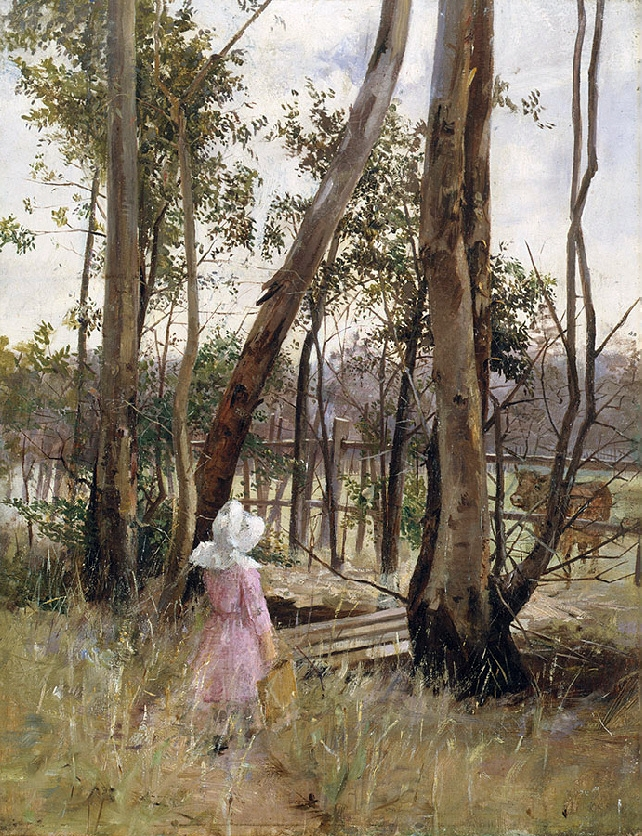
Jane Sutherland, Obstruction, Box Hill, 1887

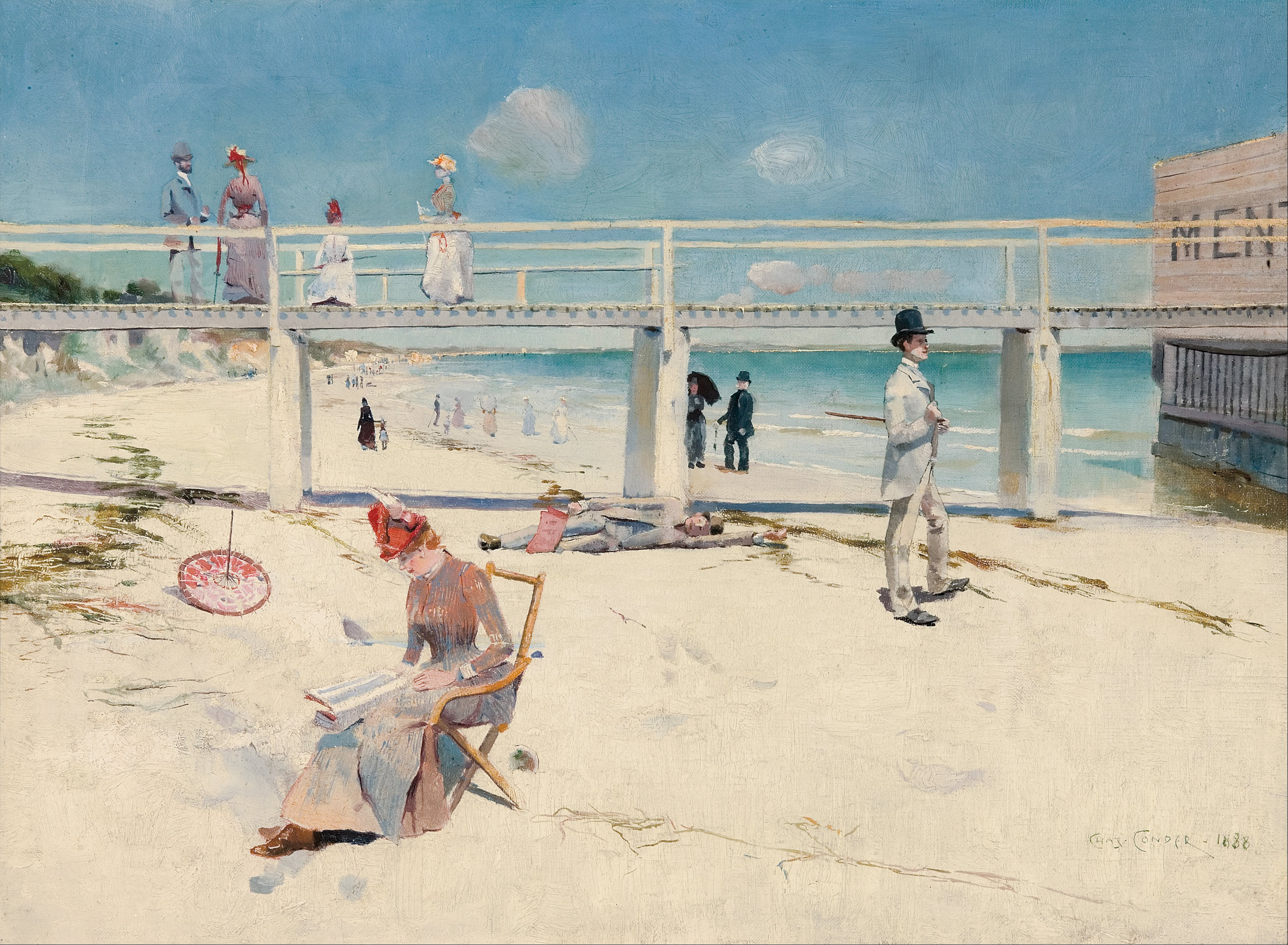
Charles Conder, A holiday at Mentone, 1888

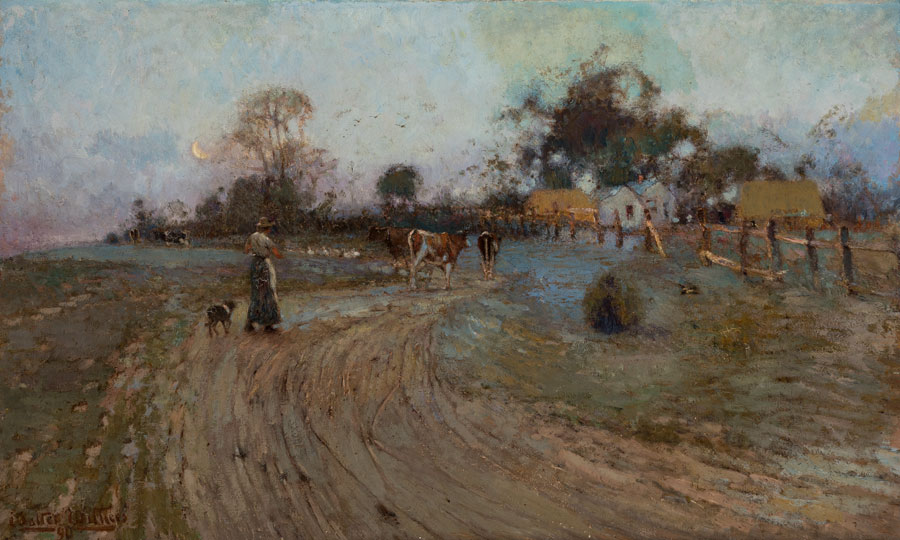
Walter Withers, The Farm, 1890

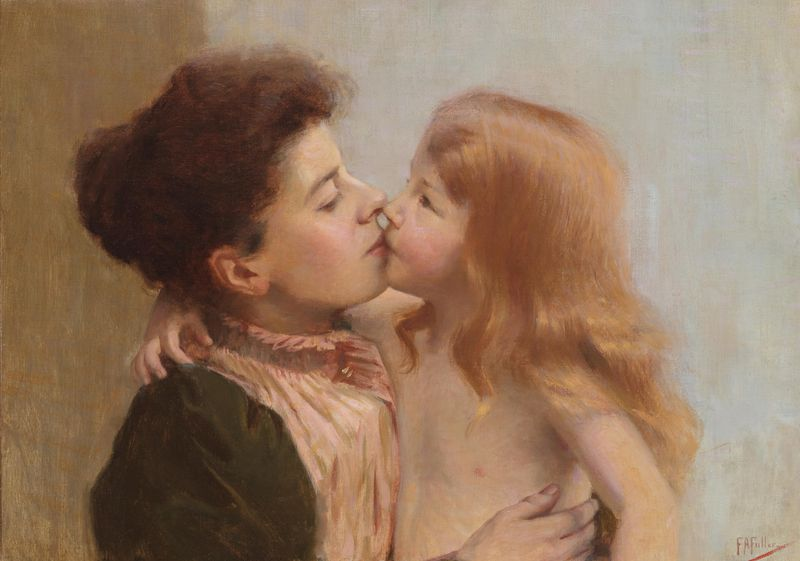
Florence Fuller, Mother and Child, 1890

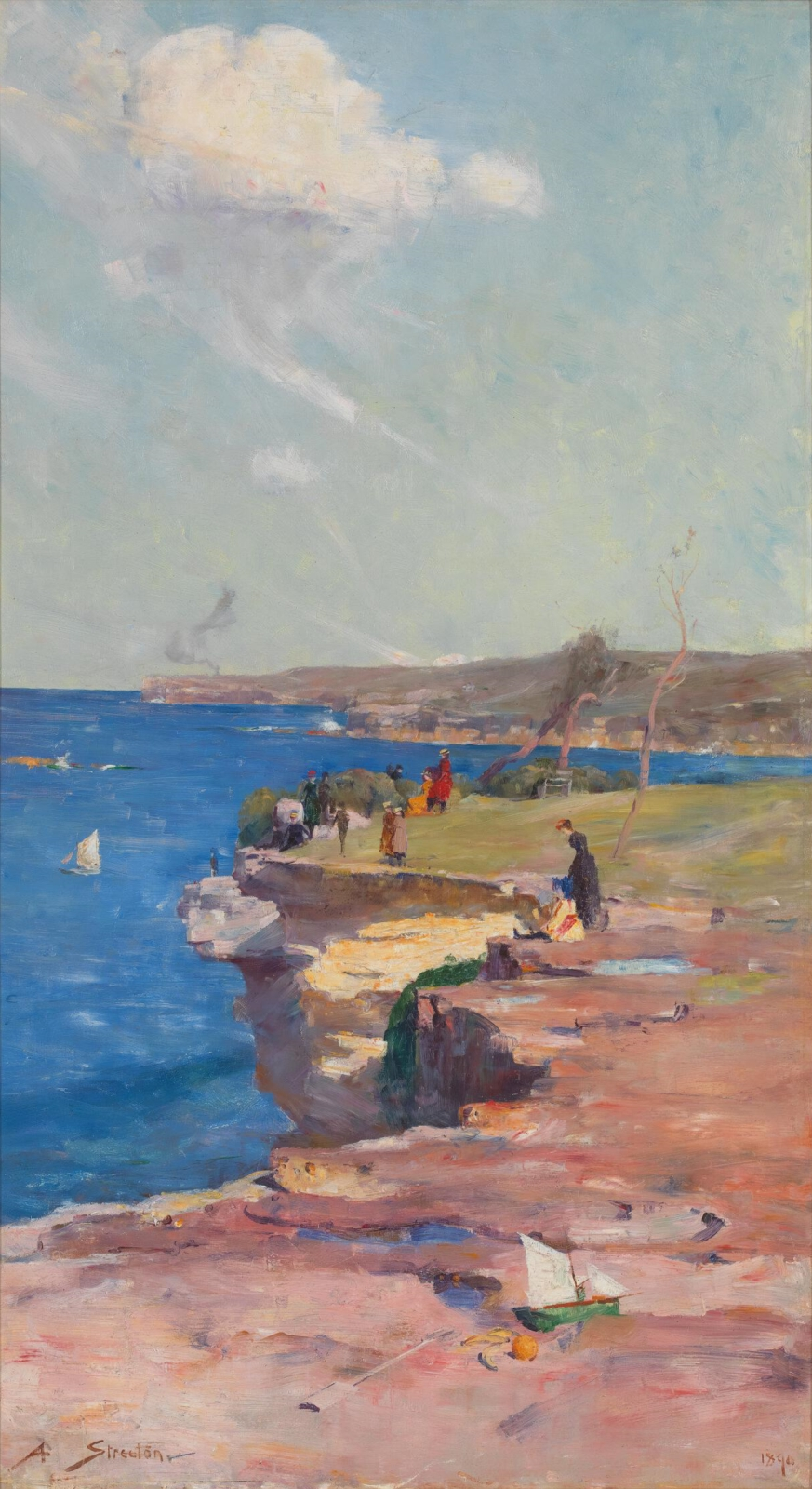
Arthur Streeton, Blue Pacific, 1890

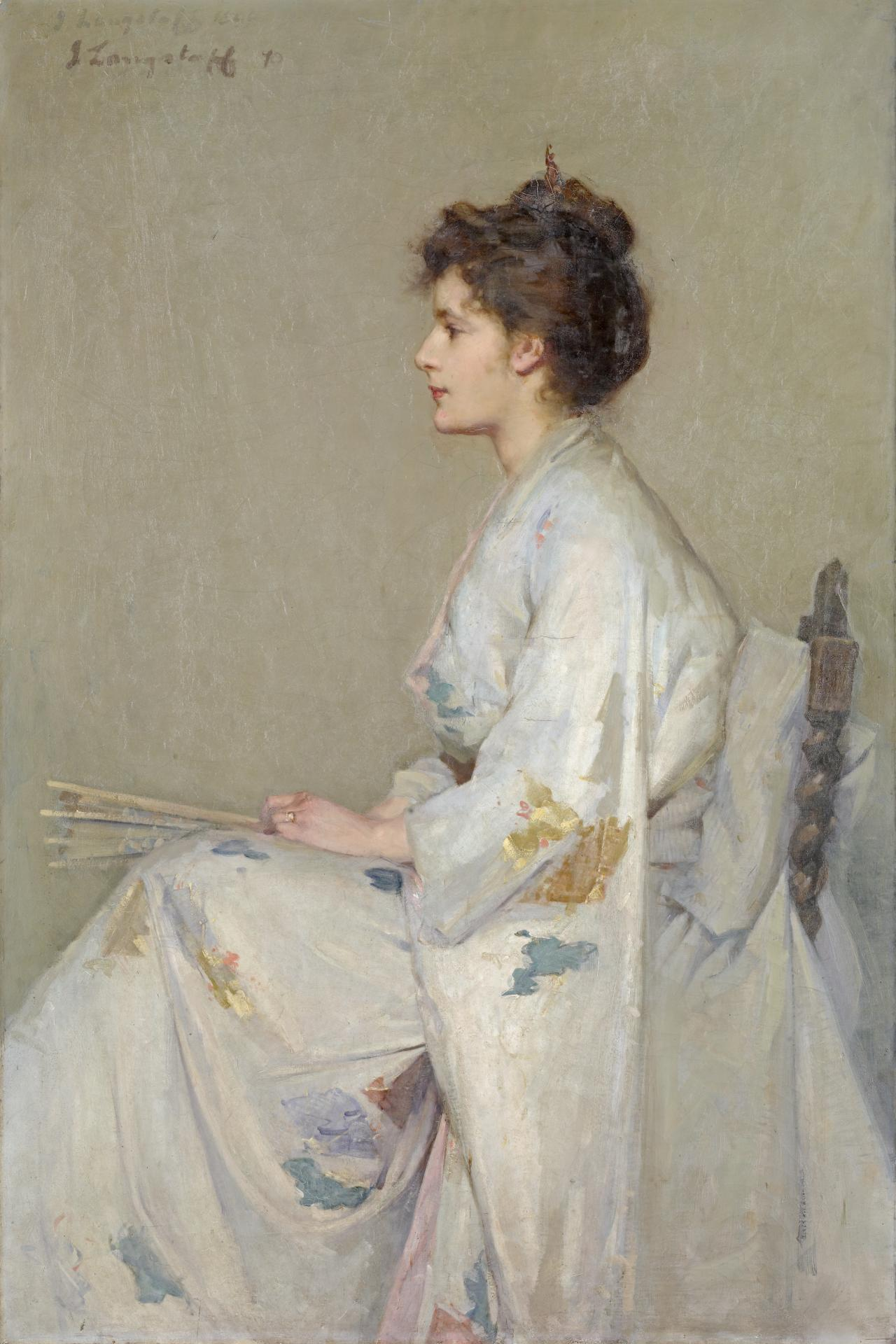
John Longstaff, Lady in Grey, 1890

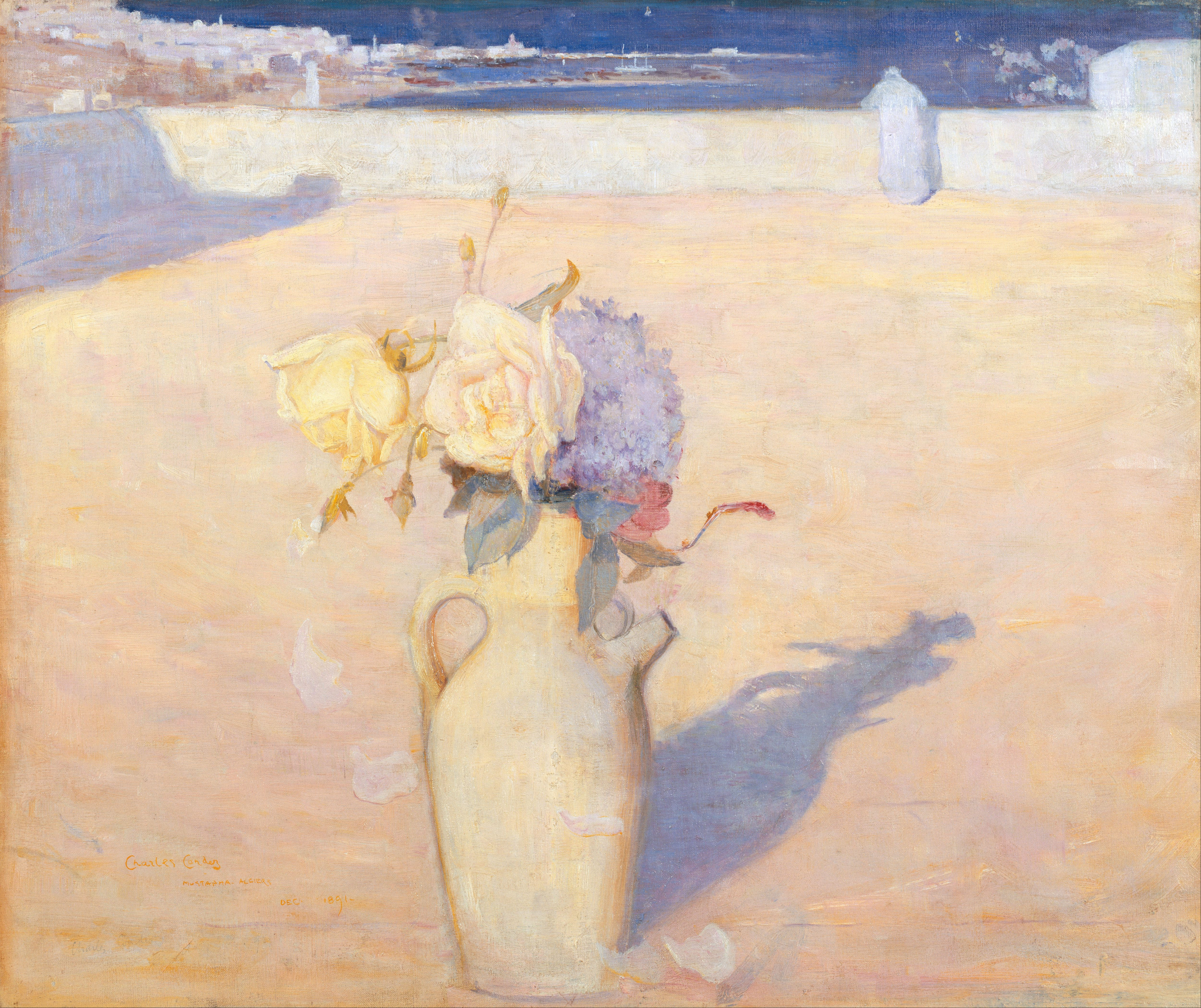
Charles Conder, The Hot Sands, 1891

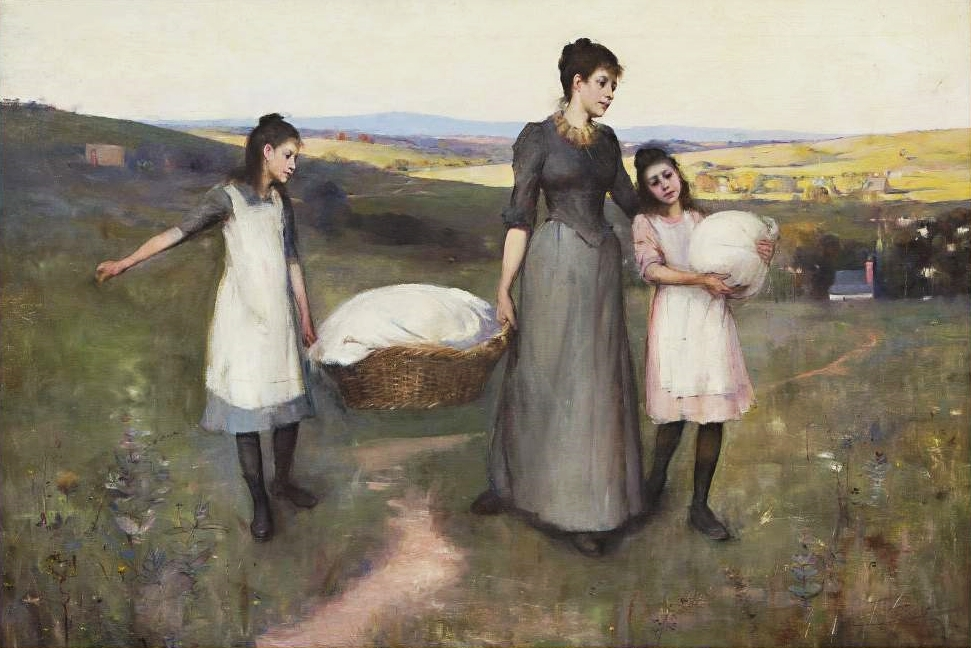
Leon Pole, The Village Laundress, 1891

Arthur Streeton, Fire's on, 1891

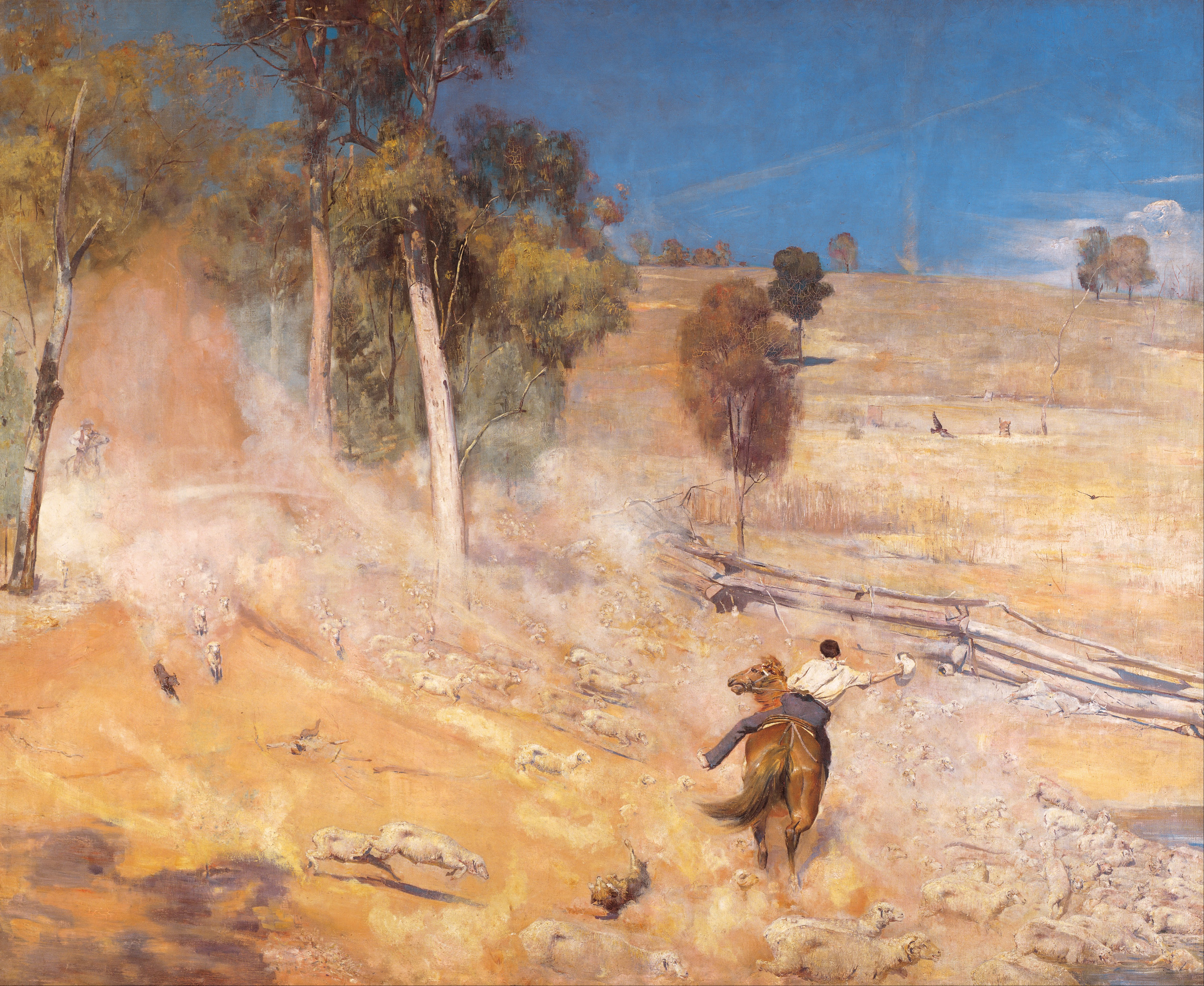
Tom Roberts, A break away!, 1891

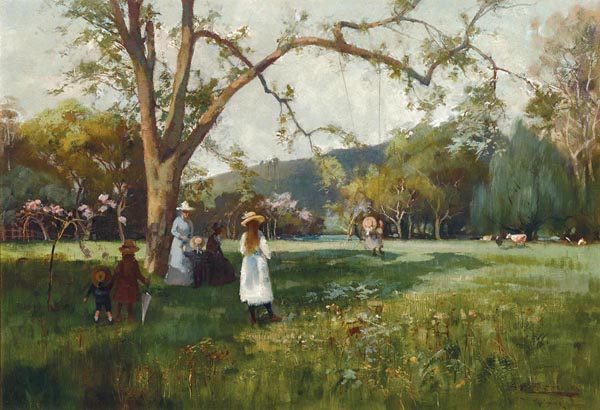
Albert Henry Fullwood, The Swing, 1892

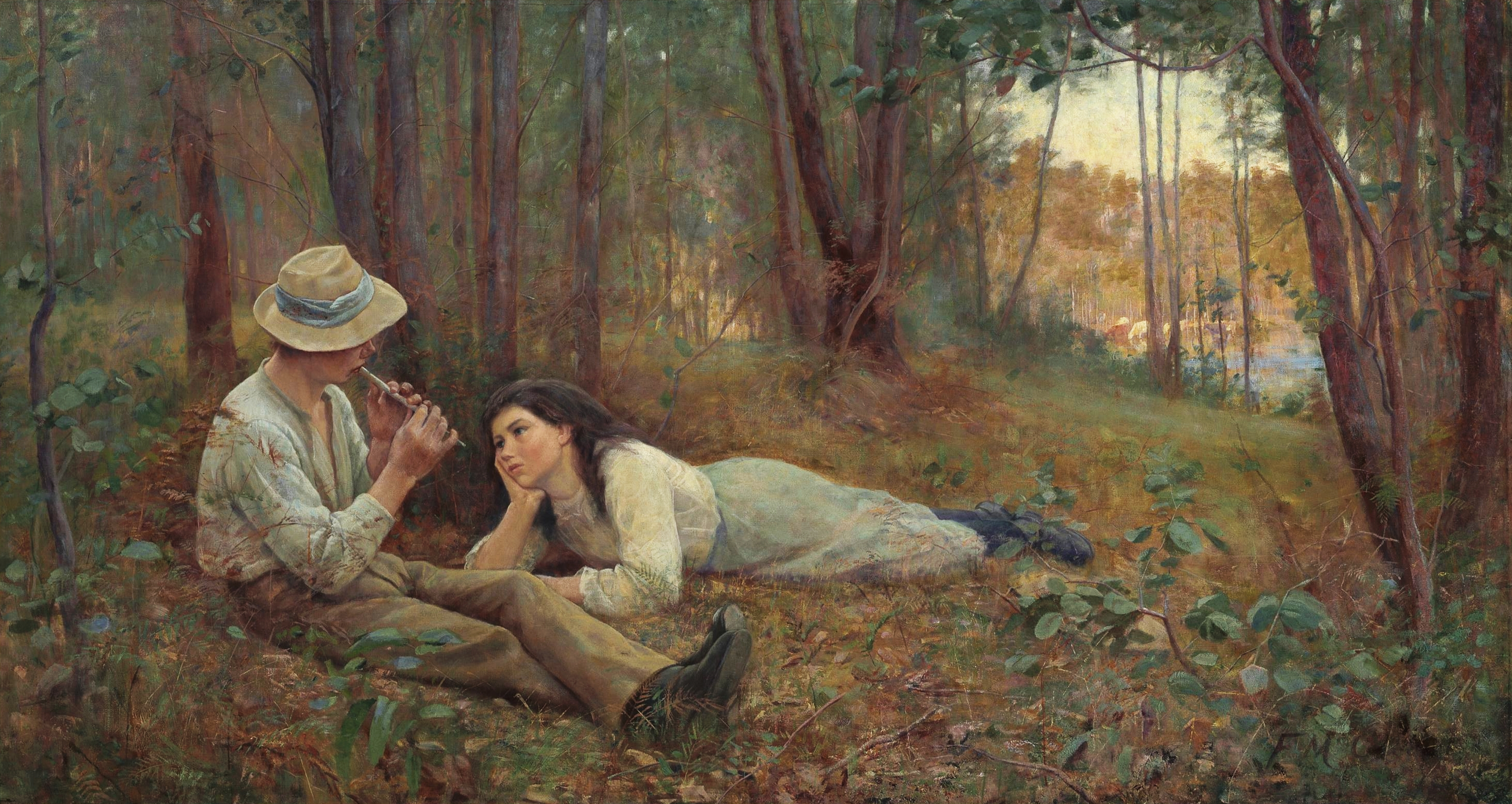
Frederick McCubbin, Bush Idyll, 1893

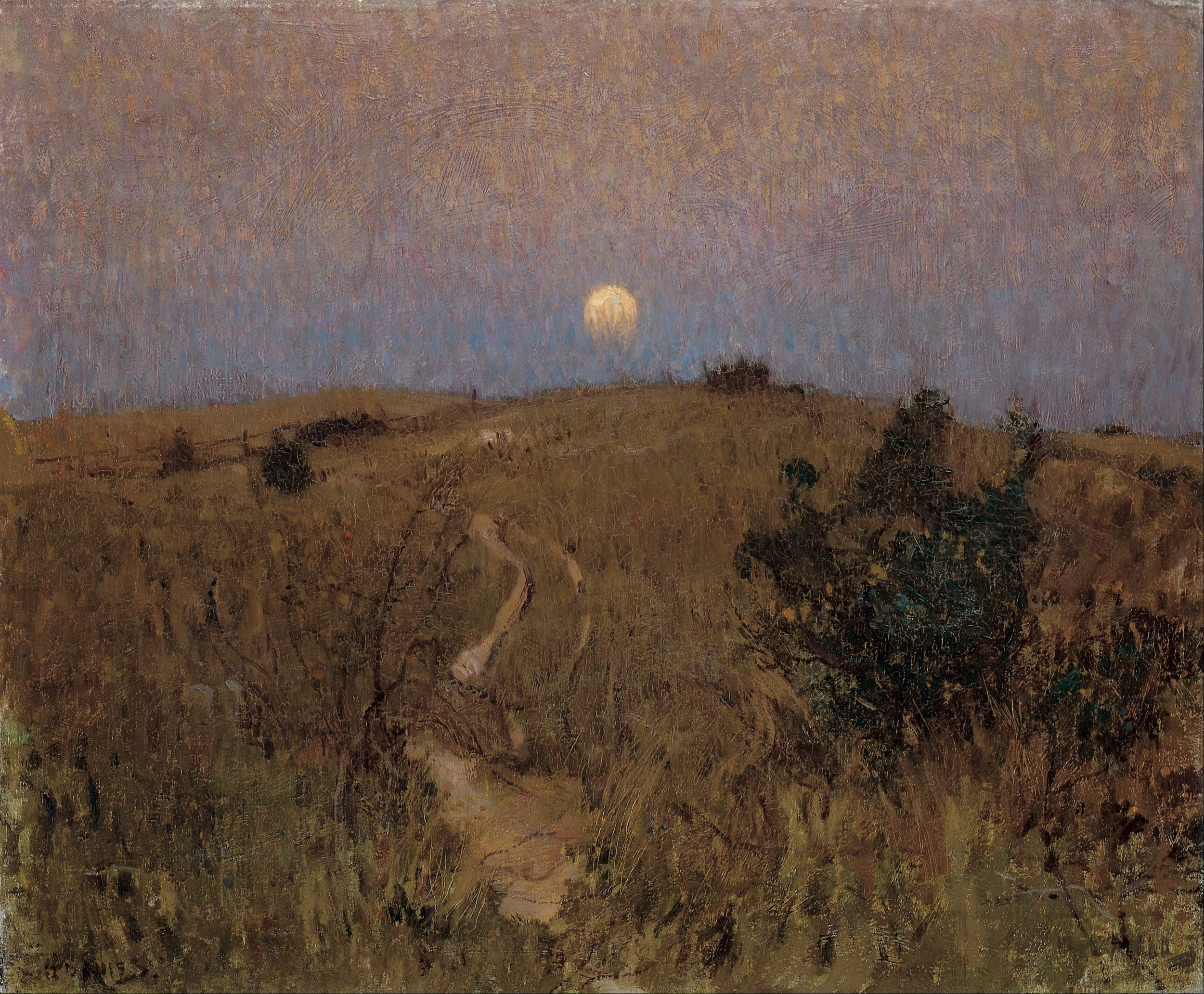
David Davies, Moonrise, 1893

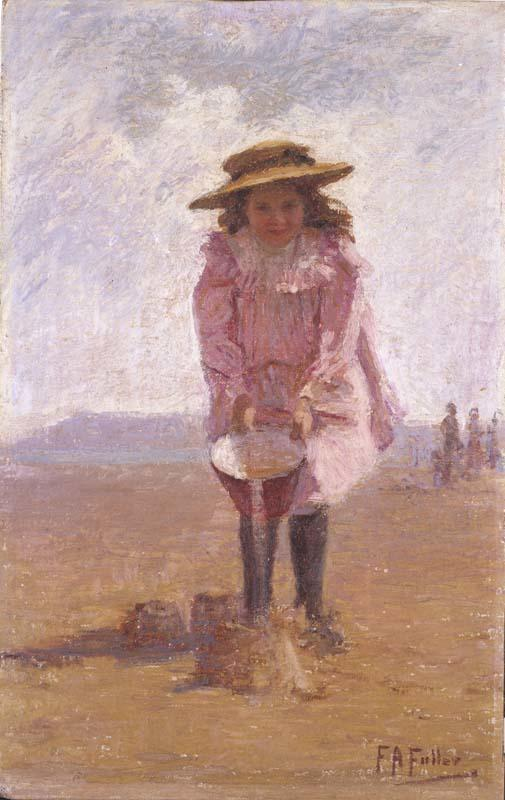
Florence Fuller, Sand Pies, 1893

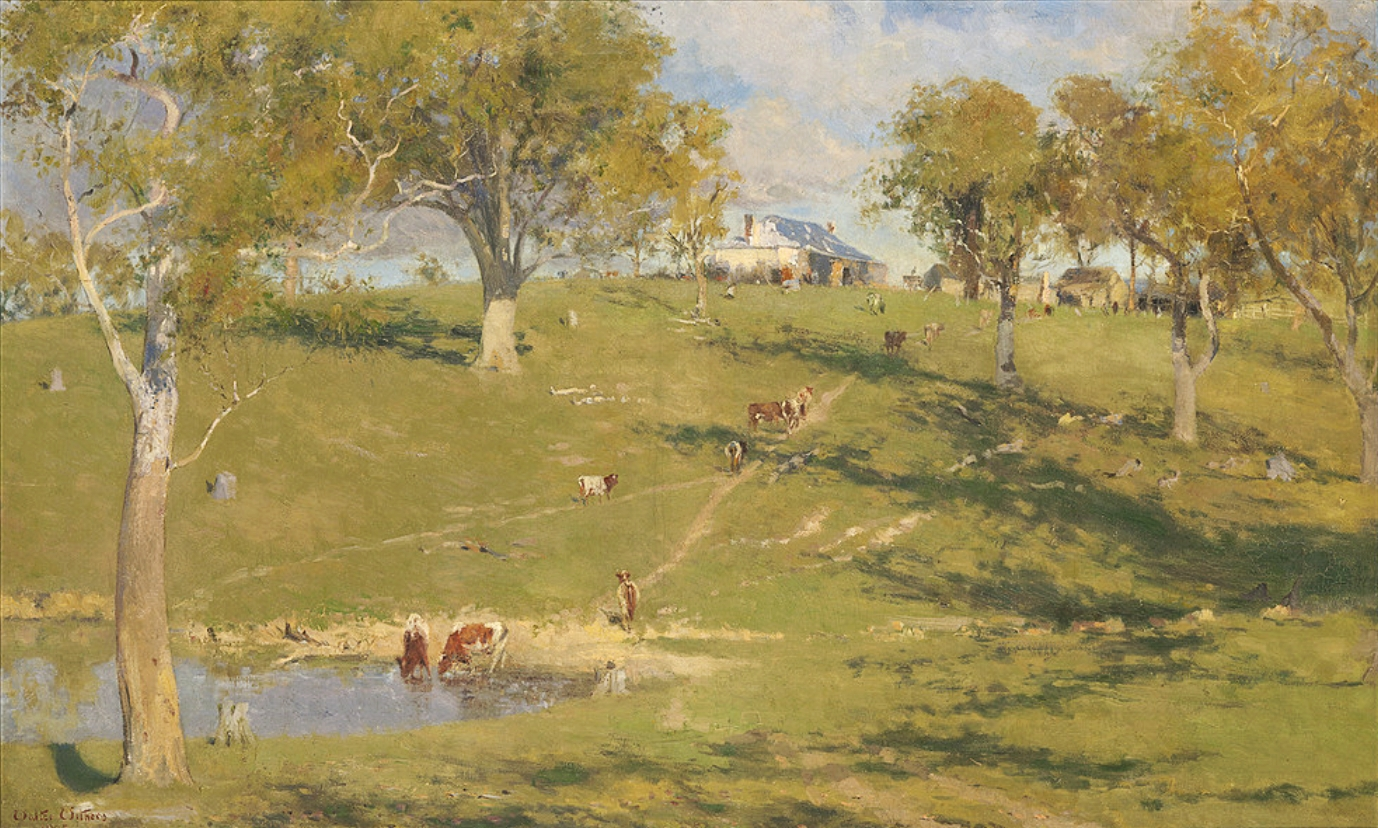
Walter Withers, Tranquil Winter, 1894

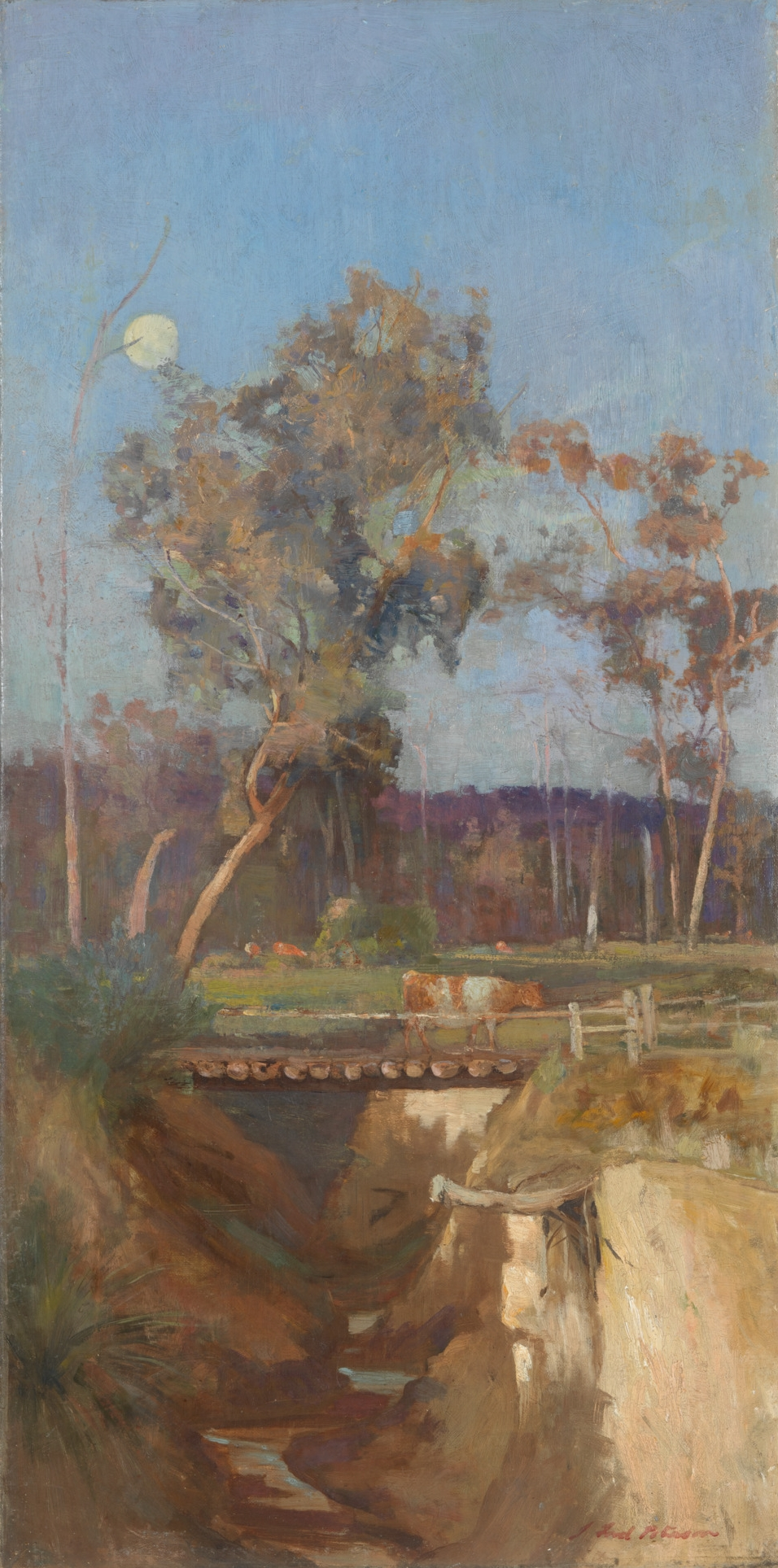
John Ford Paterson, In the Country, 1895

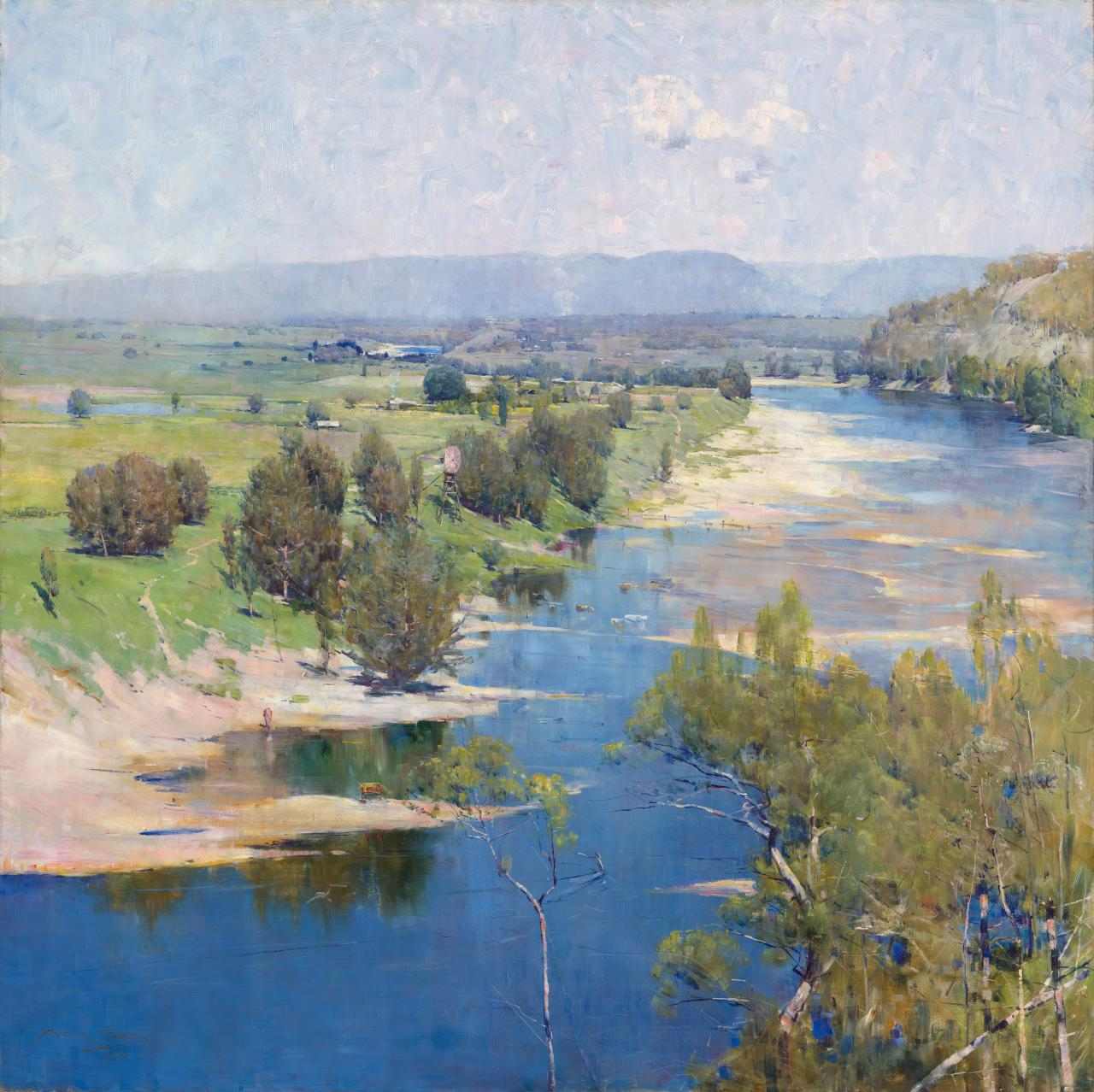
Arthur Streeton, ‘The purple noon's transparent might’, 1896

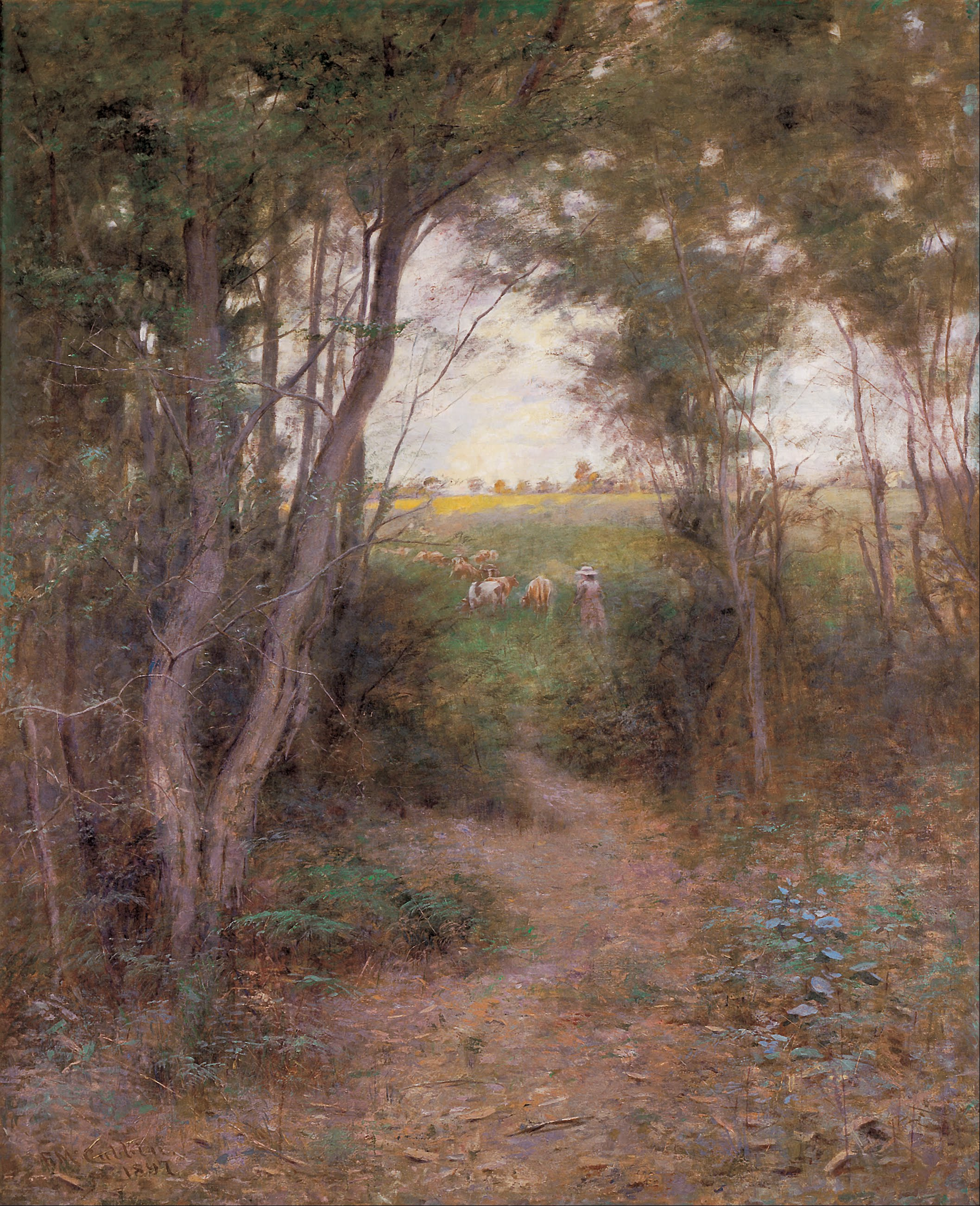
Frederick McCubbin, A ti-tree glade, 1897

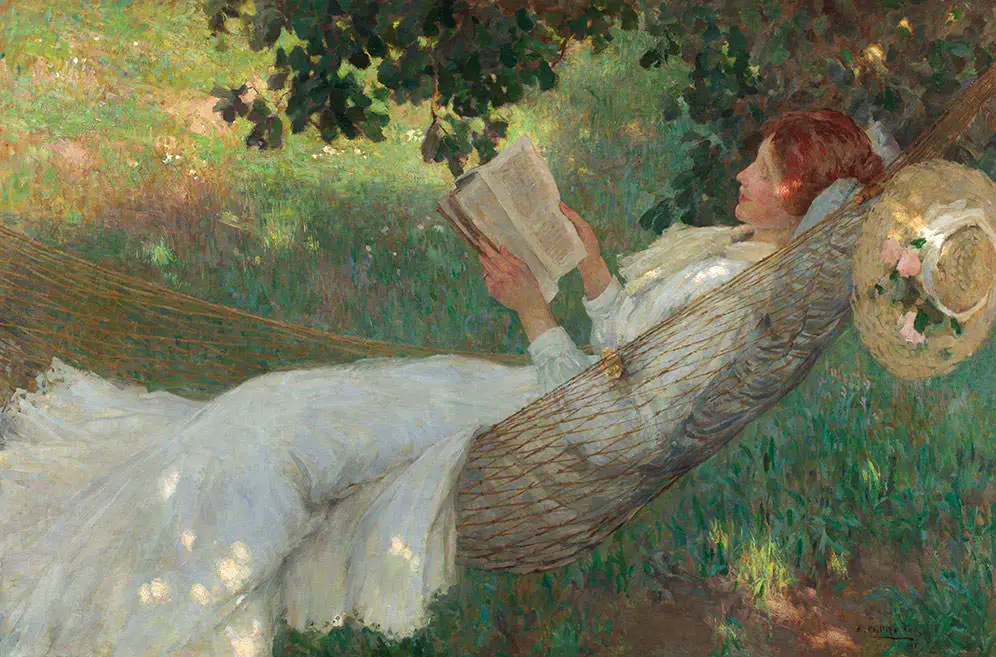
E. Phillips Fox, A Love Story, 1903

== See also ==
- Mortimer Menpes, Australian artist who was a close associate of Whistler and experimented with impressionism
- John Russell, Australian impressionist who spent much of his career in France
- Iso Rae, Australian impressionist who spent much of her career in France

General

- Visual arts of Australia
