= List of paintings by Tom Roberts =

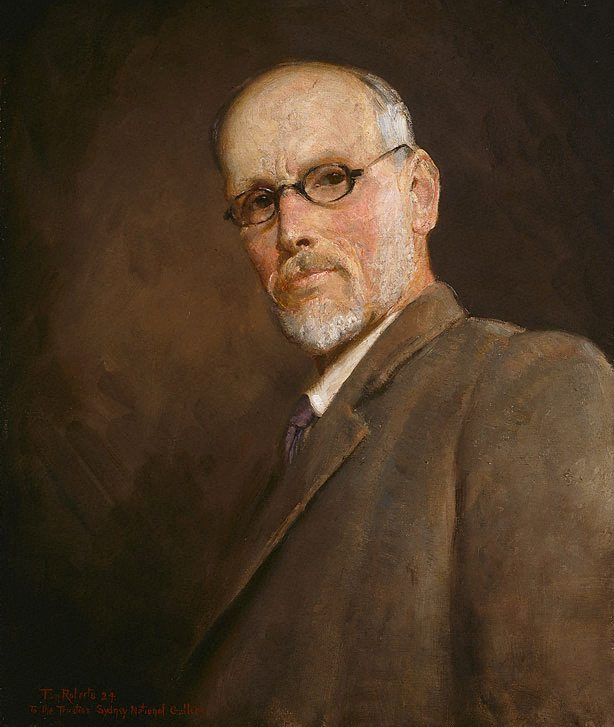
Self Portrait 1924

This is an incomplete list of the paintings by the Australian painter Tom Roberts. Roberts was active between 1883 and his death in 1931. He was a prominent member of the Heidelberg School art movement, also known as Australian Impressionism.

As a child, Roberts migrated from England to Australia in 1869, settling in Melbourne. He studied art under Louis Buvelot and returned to England in 1881 for three years's art study at the Royal Academy Schools from 1881 to 1884. In Europe he was influenced by Jules Bastien-Lepage and James Abbott McNeill Whistler. In 1883 he met the Spanish artists Lorreano Barrau and Ramon Casas in Granada, reinforcing the principles of impressionism and plein air painting.

Between 1885 and 1892, Roberts was based in Melbourne where he made his living as a portraitist while playing a key role in establishing the en plein air artist's camps that led to the Heidelberg School. Roberts was also a driving figure in the famous 9 by 5 Impression Exhibition in Melbourne in 1889, contributing 62 works.

Roberts relocated to Sydney in 1890 and continued to paint in artists' camps. During this period, Roberts painted a series of works consciously attempting to frame a uniquely Australian identity, including Shearing the Rams (1890), A break away! (1891) and Bailed up.

In 1901 Roberts was commissioned to paint the opening of the first Parliament of the newly federated Australia; resulting in the monumental Big Picture (1903). The mental and physical strain involved in its creation weakened his eyesight, lead to depression, and is generally seen as a turning point in his career after which his work never again reached the same heights. Roberts travelled to the United Kingdom to complete the work and stayed there until 1914, when he returned to Melbourne. He died in Melbourne in 1931.

Helen Topliss published a two-volume catalogue raisonné of Roberts' works in 1985.

== List of works ==
Table featuring paintings by Tom Roberts
| Image | Title | Year | Medium | Dimensions | Collection | Ref. |
|---|---|---|---|---|---|---|
| | (Posthumous portrait of Richard Roberts, the artist’s father) | c. 1875-c. 1876 | Oil on canvas on board | 35.5 by 31.3 centimetres (14.0 in × 12.3 in) | National Gallery of Australia, Canberra | |
| | The northern cobbler | c. 1879 | Oil on paper | 52.5 by 37 centimetres (20.7 in × 14.6 in) | University of Queensland, Brisbane | |
| | Brought back | c. 1883 | gouache on paper on board | 23.2 by 15.6 centimetres (9.1 in × 6.1 in) | National Gallery of Victoria, Melbourne | |
| | Rejected | 1883 | Oil on canvas | | Private collection | |
| | Basking - a corner in the Alhambra | 1883 | Oil on panel | 21.6 by 16.2 centimetres (8.5 in × 6.4 in) | National Gallery of Australia, Canberra | |
| | (A Moorish doorway) | 1883 | Oil on canvas | 48.3 by 33.3 centimetres (19.0 in × 13.1 in) | National Gallery of Victoria, Melbourne | |
| | Still life with pomegranates | 1883 | Oil on canvas | 31.1 by 64.3 centimetres (12.2 in × 25.3 in) | Private collection | |
| | Una muchacha | 1883 | Oil on wood panel | 27 by 20.5 centimetres (10.6 in × 8.1 in) | Private collection | |
| | Grey day in spring, Venice | 1884 | Oil on panel | 11.3 by 20.2 centimetres (4.4 in × 8.0 in) | National Gallery of Australia, Canberra | |
| | Woman on a balcony | 1884 | Oil on academy board | 27.1 by 13.1 centimetres (10.7 in × 5.2 in) | Private collection | |
| | The Thames and Cleopatra's Needle | c. 1884 | Oil on canvas | 12.4 by 22.7 centimetres (4.9 in × 8.9 in) | National Gallery of Australia, Canberra | |
| | The sculptor's studio | 1884-85 | Oil on canvas | 61.2 by 91.8 centimetres (24.1 in × 36.1 in) | National Gallery of Australia, Canberra | |
| | Winter morning after rain, Gardiner's Creek | 1885 | Oil on canvas | 47 by 66 centimetres (19 in × 26 in) | Art Gallery of South Australia, Adelaide | |
| | A quiet day on Darebin Creek | 1885 | Oil on panel | 26.4 by 34.8 centimetres (10.4 in × 13.7 in) | National Gallery of Australia, Canberra | |
| | Quiet Stream, Heidelberg | c. 1885 | Oil on canvas | 24.5 by 45.2 centimetres (9.6 in × 17.8 in) | Private collection | |
| | A Sunday afternoon picnic at Box Hill | c. 1886 | Oil on wood panel | 41.0 by 30.8 centimetres (16.1 in × 12.1 in) | National Gallery of Australia, Canberra | |
| | Mary | c. 1886 | oil on canvas | 61.0 by 51.0 centimetres (24.0 in × 20.1 in) | National Gallery of Victoria, Melbourne | |
| | Caleb Williamson Esq | c. 1886 | Oil on canvas | 93.5 by 106.6 centimetres (36.8 in × 42.0 in) | Private collection | |
| | A summer morning tiff | 1886 | Oil on canvas | 75.6 by 51.2 centimetres (29.8 in × 20.2 in) | Art Gallery of Ballarat | |
| | Charcoal burners | 1886 | Oil on canvas | 61.4 by 92.3 centimetres (24.2 in × 36.3 in) | Art Gallery of Ballarat | |
| | Bourke Street | 1886 | Oil on canvas | 51.2 by 76.7 centimetres (20.2 in × 30.2 in) | National Gallery of Australia, Canberra | |
| | Coming South | 1886 | Oil on canvas | 63.5 by 52.2 centimetres (25.0 in × 20.6 in) | National Gallery of Victoria, Melbourne | |
| | The artists' camp | 1886 | Oil on canvas | 46.0 by 60.9 centimetres (18.1 in × 24.0 in) | National Gallery of Victoria, Melbourne | |
| | Louis Abrahams | 1886 | Oil on canvas | 40.6 by 35.6 centimetres (16.0 in × 14.0 in) | National Gallery of Australia, Canberra | |
| | Miss Minna Simpson | 1886 | Oil on canvas | 59.5 by 49.5 centimetres (23.4 in × 19.5 in) | National Gallery of Australia, Canberra | |
| | The Sunny South | 1887 | Oil on canvas | 30.8 by 61.4 centimetres (12.1 in × 24.2 in) | National Gallery of Victoria, Melbourne | |
| | Boat on beach, Queenscliff | c. 1887 | Oil on canvas | 35.4 by 46 centimetres (13.9 in × 18.1 in) | National Gallery of Australia, Canberra | |
| | Reconciliation | c. 1887 | Oil on canvas | 126.2 by 75.2 centimetres (49.7 in × 29.6 in) | Castlemaine Art Museum | |
| | Slumbering sea, Mentone | 1887 | Oil on canvas | 51.3 by 76.5 centimetres (20.2 in × 30.1 in) | National Gallery of Victoria, Melbourne | |
| | Madame Pfund | 1887 | Oil on canvas on composition board | 142.7 by 98.9 centimetres (56.2 in × 38.9 in) | National Gallery of Victoria, Melbourne | |
| | 'Evening, when the quiet east flushes faintly at the sun's last look' | 1887-88 | Oil on canvas | 50.8 by 76.4 centimetres (20.0 in × 30.1 in) | National Gallery of Victoria, Melbourne | |
| | Blue eyes and brown | 1887 (dated 1888) | Oil on canvas | 127.0 by 76.3 centimetres (50.0 in × 30.0 in) | National Gallery of Victoria, Melbourne | |
| | An autumn morning, Milson's Point, Sydney | 1888 | Oil on canvas | 45.7 by 76.2 centimetres (18.0 in × 30.0 in) | Art Gallery of New South Wales, Sydney | |
| | The Pink Dress | 1888 | Oil on canvas | 29.7 by 20.1 centimetres (11.7 in × 7.9 in) | New England Regional Art Museum, Armidale | |
| | Holiday sketch at Coogee | 1888 | Oil on canvas | 40.3 by 55.9 centimetres (15.9 in × 22.0 in) | Art Gallery of New South Wales, Sydney | |
| | An autumn morning, Milson's Point, Sydney | 1888 | Oil on canvas | 45.7 by 76.2 centimetres (18.0 in × 30.0 in) | Art Gallery of New South Wales, Sydney | |
| | Mrs L. A. Abrahams | 1888 | Oil on canvas | 41.0 by 36.0 centimetres (16.1 in × 14.2 in) | National Gallery of Victoria, Melbourne | |
| | Louise, daughter of the Hon. L. L. Smith | 1888 | Oil on canvas | 102.0 by 77.7 centimetres (40.2 in × 30.6 in) | National Gallery of Victoria, Melbourne | |
| | An Australian native | 1888 | Oil on canvas | 127.2 by 76.2 centimetres (50.1 in × 30.0 in) | National Gallery of Australia, Canberra | |
| | Dewy eve | 1888 | Oil on canvas | 62.9 by 74.0 centimetres (24.8 in × 29.1 in) | Art Gallery of Western Australia, Perth | |
| | Manly, 1888 | 1888 | Oil on wood panel | 21 by 34 centimetres (8.3 in × 13.4 in) | Manly Art Gallery and Museum | |
| | Jealousy | 1889 | Oil on canvas on hardboard | 92.1 by 139.7 centimetres (36.3 in × 55.0 in) | Art Gallery of New South Wales, Sydney | |
| | The troubadour of Scotts | 1889 | Oil on cedar panel | 22.5 by 12 centimetres (8.9 in × 4.7 in) | Westpac Corporate Art Collection | |
| | The sick stockrider | c. 1889-c. 1891 | Gouache and watercolour over pencil on cardboard | 21 by 29.8 centimetres (8.3 in × 11.7 in) | Queensland Art Gallery and Gallery of Modern Art, Brisbane | |
| | Alexander Anderson Snr | 1889 | Oil on canvas | 25.4 by 20.3 centimetres (10.0 in × 8.0 in) | Castlemaine Art Museum | |
| | Head study (Self portrait) | 1889 | Oil on wood panel | 35.4 by 24.8 centimetres (13.9 in × 9.8 in) | Kerry Stokes collection, Perth | |
| | Cream and black | 1889 | Oil on cedar panel | 26.6 by 16.9 centimetres (10.5 in × 6.7 in) | Private collection | |
| | Harbourscape | c. 1890s | Oil on panel | 6 by 11.1 centimetres (2.4 in × 4.4 in) | National Gallery of Australia, Canberra | |
| | Ulverstone | c. 1890s | Oil on canvas | 40.6 by 68.7 centimetres (16.0 in × 27.0 in) | Private collection | |
| | Shearing the Rams | 1890 | Oil on canvas | 122.4 by 183.3 centimetres (48.2 in × 72.2 in) | National Gallery of Victoria, Melbourne | |
| | Prawns | 1890 | Oil on canvas | 25.4 by 33 centimetres (10.0 in × 13.0 in) | Art Gallery of Western Australia, Perth | |
| | Edward Trenchard | 1890 | Oil on canvas | 107.0 by 76.5 centimetres (42.1 in × 30.1 in) | National Gallery of Victoria, Melbourne | |
| | S.W. Pring | 1891 | Oil on canvas | 30.6 by 25.8 centimetres (12.0 in × 10.2 in) | Queensland Art Gallery and Gallery of Modern Art, Brisbane | |
| | Lumbering | c. 1891 | Watercolour over underdrawing in pencil | 58.4 by 98.2 centimetres (23.0 in × 38.7 in) | National Gallery of Australia, Canberra | |
| | The old barracks at Collendina | c. 1891 | Oil on canvas | 40.0 by 51.5 centimetres (15.7 in × 20.3 in) | Private collection | |
| | Smike Streeton age 24 | 1891 | Oil on canvas | 45.7 by 35.7 centimetres (18.0 in × 14.1 in) | Art Gallery of New South Wales, Sydney | |
| | A Break Away! | 1891 | Oil on canvas | 137.3 by 167.8 centimetres (54.1 in × 66.1 in) | Art Gallery of South Australia, Adelaide | |
| | Charlie Turner | 1892 | Oil on canvas on paperboard | 39.4 by 29.8 centimetres (15.5 in × 11.7 in) | Art Gallery of New South Wales, Sydney | |
| | Young lubra, Cape York | 1892 | Oil on canvas | 58 by 37.5 centimetres (22.8 in × 14.8 in) | Private collection | |
| | (Indigenous gathering, Far North Queensland) | 1892 | Oil on canvas | 37.7 by 55.9 centimetres (14.8 in × 22.0 in) | Queensland Art Gallery and Gallery of Modern Art, Brisbane | |
| | Amehnam (Wolya clan, Port Darwin) | 1892 | Oil on canvas | 44.5 by 34.5 centimetres (17.5 in × 13.6 in) | Queensland Art Gallery and Gallery of Modern Art, Brisbane | |
| | Eileen | 1892 | Oil on canvas | 48.9 by 36.2 centimetres (19.3 in × 14.3 in) | Art Gallery of New South Wales, Sydney | |
| | A turbaned man | c. 1892 | Oil on canvas | 66.3 by 45.9 centimetres (26.1 in × 18.1 in) | National Gallery of Victoria, Melbourne | |
| | James T. Donovan | 1892 | Oil on canvas | 33.3 by 28.5 centimetres (13.1 in × 11.2 in) | National Portrait Gallery, Canberra | |
| | Sir William Charles Windeyer | 1892 | Oil on canvas | 66.0 by 56.2 centimetres (26.0 in × 22.1 in) | National Portrait Gallery, Canberra | |
| | Sir Henry Parkes | 1892 | Oil on canvas | 66 by 56 centimetres (26 in × 22 in) | Art Gallery of South Australia, Adelaide | |
| | Adagio | c. 1893 | Oil on paperboard | 24.0 by 49.4 centimetres (9.4 in × 19.4 in) | Art Gallery of New South Wales, Sydney | |
| | Plink-a-plong | 1893 | Oil on canvas | 68.5 by 50.8 centimetres (27.0 in × 20.0 in) | Art Gallery of South Australia, Adelaide | |
| | Practising the Minuet (Miss Hilda Spong) | 1893 | Oil on canvas | 183.0 by 97.0 centimetres (72.0 in × 38.2 in) | National Portrait Gallery, Canberra | |
| | Shearing shed, Newstead | 1893-94 | Oil on panel | 22.2 by 33 centimetres (8.7 in × 13.0 in) | National Gallery of Australia, Canberra | |
| | An eastern princess | c. 1893 | Oil on canvas | 61 by 51 centimetres (24 in × 20 in) | National Gallery of Australia, Canberra | |
| | Mrs Leonard Dodds | c. 1893 | Oil on canvas | 50.8 by 40.7 centimetres (20.0 in × 16.0 in) | National Gallery of Australia, Canberra | |
| | Christmas flowers and Christmas Belles (The flower sellers) | c. 1893-c. 1896 | Oil on canvas | 53 by 38 centimetres (21 in × 15 in) | Manly Art Gallery and Museum | |
| | The bullock team | c. 1893 | Watercolour on paper | 59 by 91 centimetres (23 in × 36 in) | Manly Art Gallery and Museum | |
| | The Golden Fleece | 1894 | Oil on canvas | 104.0 by 158.7 centimetres (40.9 in × 62.5 in) | Art Gallery of New South Wales, Sydney | |
| | Mosman's Bay | 1894 | Oil on canvas | 64.7 by 97.8 centimetres (25.5 in × 38.5 in) | New England Regional Art Museum, Armidale | |
| | Peanahgo Billipimbah: Billie Millera | 1894 | Oil on canvas mounted on board | 42.0 by 34.0 centimetres (16.5 in × 13.4 in) | Private collection | |
| | Landscape, Cremorne | 1894 | Oil on canvas | 18.6 by 42.4 centimetres (7.3 in × 16.7 in) | National Gallery of Victoria, Melbourne | |
| | Edward D. S. Ogilvie, 1894-1895 | 1894-95 | Oil on canvas | 72 by 56 centimetres (28 in × 22 in) | State Library of New South Wales, Sydney | |
| | On the Timbarra - Reek's and Allen's sluicing claim | c. 1894 | Oil on canvas on hardboard | 66.0 by 103.0 centimetres (26.0 in × 40.6 in) | Art Gallery of New South Wales, Sydney | |
| | Sir Henry Parkes | c. 1894 | Oil on canvas | 76.7 by 64.0 centimetres (30.2 in × 25.2 in) | Art Gallery of New South Wales, Sydney | |
| | In a Corner on the Macintyre | 1895 | Oil on canvas | 71.1 by 86.4 centimetres (28.0 in × 34.0 in) | National Gallery of Australia, Canberra | |
| | Ada Furlong | c. 1895 | Oil on cedar panel | 71.0 by 17.3 centimetres (28.0 in × 6.8 in) | Art Gallery of Western Australia, Perth | |
| | Miss Isobel McDonald | 1895 | Oil on canvas | 46.5 by 41.8 centimetres (18.3 in × 16.5 in) | National Gallery of Victoria, Melbourne | |
| | Bailed Up | 1895, 1927 | Oil on canvas | 134.5 by 182.8 centimetres (53.0 in × 72.0 in) | Art Gallery of New South Wales, Sydney | |
| | Silent Bob Bates | 1895 | Oil on cedar panel | 76.4 by 39.5 centimetres (30.1 in × 15.6 in) | Art Gallery of New South Wales, Sydney | |
| | Portrait of George Selth Coppin | c. 1895-c. 1899 | Oil on cedar panel | 61.2 by 34.1 centimetres (24.1 in × 13.4 in) | National Portrait Gallery, Canberra | |
| | Johann Secundus Kruse | 1895 | Oil on cedar panel | 59.5 by 32.5 centimetres (23.4 in × 12.8 in) | Private collection | |
| | Portrait of Andrew Garran | c. 1895 | Oil on cedar panel | 44.5 by 72.5 centimetres (17.5 in × 28.5 in) | Private collection | |
| | Mariah Charles | c. 1895 | Oil on canvas | 37.0 by 33.5 centimetres (14.6 in × 13.2 in) | State Library of New South Wales, Sydney | |
| | Portrait (possibly Alice Bryant) | c. 1895-c. 1899 | Oil on canvas | 30.7 by 15.3 centimetres (12.1 in × 6.0 in) | Queensland Art Gallery and Gallery of Modern Art, Brisbane | |
| | Percy FS Spence | 1896 | Oil on canvas | 37.0 by 30.9 centimetres (14.6 in × 12.2 in) | Art Gallery of New South Wales, Sydney | |
| | Sketch portrait of Sir Alex Onslow | 1896 | Oil on canvas | 32.8 by 27.8 centimetres (12.9 in × 10.9 in) | National Portrait Gallery, Canberra | |
| | 'A' Battery Field Artillery, New South Wales | 1896 | Oil on canvas | 30.5 by 50.8 centimetres (12.0 in × 20.0 in) | Australian War Memorial, Canberra | |
| | Sergeant R.D. Fraser, Mounted Rifles | 1896 | Oil on kauri pine panel | 76 by 42 centimetres (30 in × 17 in) | Australian War Memorial, Canberra | |
| | Infantryman of New South Wales 2nd Infantry Regiment | 1896 | Oil on kauri pine panel | 62.2 by 28.3 centimetres (24.5 in × 11.1 in) | Australian War Memorial, Canberra | |
| | Dion Boucicault | c. 1896 | Oil on cedar panel | 60.0 by 32.2 centimetres (23.6 in × 12.7 in) | Private collection | |
| | Sydney Harbour from Milson's Point | 1897 | Oil on wood | 18.3 by 33.0 centimetres (7.2 in × 13.0 in) | Art Gallery of New South Wales, Sydney | |
| | A mountain muster | 1897, reworked c. 1920s | Oil on canvas | 133.0 by 153.3 centimetres (52.4 in × 60.4 in) | National Gallery of Victoria, Melbourne | |
| | Alfred Hill | 1897 | Oil on cedar board | 58.3 by 33.5 centimetres (23.0 in × 13.2 in) | National Library of New Zealand, Wellington | |
| | Sir Thomas Allwright Dibbs | 1897 | Oil on canvas | 128 by 100 centimetres (50 in × 39 in) | State Library of New South Wales, Sydney | |
| | Mrs Tryphena A. Dibbs | 1897 | Oil on canvas | 124 by 103 centimetres (49 in × 41 in) | State Library of New South Wales, Sydney | |
| | Miss Florence Schmidt | 1897 | Oil on canvas | 65.8 by 55.0 centimetres (25.9 in × 21.7 in) | Art Gallery of Western Australia, Perth | |
| | Portrait of Florence | c. 1898 | Oil on wood | 66.6 by 38.7 centimetres (26.2 in × 15.2 in) | Art Gallery of New South Wales, Sydney | |
| | Miss Florence Greaves | 1898 | Pastel on paper | 41.0 by 34.5 centimetres (16.1 in × 13.6 in) | Art Gallery of New South Wales, Sydney | |
| | Mrs John St Vincent Welch | 1898 | Pastel | 82 by 32.8 centimetres (32.3 in × 12.9 in) | National Gallery of Australia, Canberra | |
| | Crying baby (Caleb Roberts) | 1898 | pastel | 33 by 27.9 centimetres (13.0 in × 11.0 in) | National Gallery of Australia, Canberra | |
| | Frances Ross, actress | c. 1898 | Oil on wood | 62.3 by 47.0 centimetres (24.5 in × 18.5 in) | Art Gallery of New South Wales, Sydney | |
| | Mrs Lucy Scot Skirving | 1898 | Oil on canvas | 96.5 by 64.8 centimetres (38.0 in × 25.5 in) | Art Gallery of New South Wales, Sydney | |
| | Sir James Reading Fairfax | 1898 | Oil on canvas on board | 73.0 by 60.5 centimetres (28.7 in × 23.8 in) | National Portrait Gallery, Canberra | |
| | Arthur H. Adams | c. 1898 | Oil on wood panel | 60.8 by 33.5 centimetres (23.9 in × 13.2 in) | University of Queensland, Brisbane | |
| | Portrait of Professor G.W.L. Marshall Hall | 1899 | Oil on wood panel | 57.6 by 45.6 centimetres (22.7 in × 18.0 in) | Australian Performing Arts Collection, Arts Centre Melbourne | |
| | Mrs WAB Greaves | 1899 | Oil on canvas | 77.5 by 60.4 centimetres (30.5 in × 23.8 in) | Art Gallery of New South Wales, Sydney | |
| | A study of Jephthah's daughter | 1899 | Oil on canvas | 76.5 by 51.0 centimetres (30.1 in × 20.1 in) | Art Gallery of New South Wales, Sydney | |
| | Elise Pinschof Wiedermann | 1899 | Pastel | 92.5 by 58.5 centimetres (36.4 in × 23.0 in) | Art Gallery of New South Wales, Sydney | |
| | (Circular Quay) | 1899 | Oil on wood | 10.7 by 21.6 centimetres (4.2 in × 8.5 in) | Art Gallery of New South Wales, Sydney | |
| | The camp, Sirius Cove | 1899 | Oil on canvas on paperboard | 24.7 by 33.2 centimetres (9.7 in × 13.1 in) | Art Gallery of New South Wales, Sydney | |
| | (Circular Quay) | 1900 | Oil on wood | 12.5 by 19.4 centimetres (4.9 in × 7.6 in) | Art Gallery of New South Wales, Sydney | |
| | A French hat | 1900 | pastel on canvas laid on cedar panel | 57.6 by 45.6 centimetres (22.7 in × 18.0 in) | Art Gallery of Ballarat | |
| | Hutt Valley | 1900 | Oil on panel | 19.1 by 10.3 centimetres (7.5 in × 4.1 in) | Te Papa, Wellington | |
| | In Quarantine, Wellington | 1900 | Oil on panel | 19.0 by 8.5 centimetres (7.5 in × 3.3 in) | Te Papa, Wellington | |
| | Portrait of Mr TP Purves | 1900 | Oil on canvas | 53.0 by 43.0 centimetres (20.9 in × 16.9 in) | Art Gallery of New South Wales, Sydney | |
| | Carmen and Elizabeth Pinschof | 1900 | Pastel on linen | 59.4 by 59.4 centimetres (23.4 in × 23.4 in) | National Gallery of Victoria, Melbourne | |
| | Louise Pinschof | 1900 | Pastel on paper | 43.2 by 34.1 centimetres (17.0 in × 13.4 in) | Art Gallery of New South Wales, Sydney | |
| | Nancy Elmhurst Goode | 1900 | Coloured pastel | 82.4 by 58.0 centimetres (32.4 in × 22.8 in) | National Gallery of Victoria, Melbourne | |
| | J.C.W. Nicholson | 1901 | Oil on canvas | 214.4 by 137.2 centimetres (84.4 in × 54.0 in) | Queensland Art Gallery and Gallery of Modern Art, Brisbane | |
| | The Big Picture (The Opening of the First Parliament of the Commonwealth of Australia by H.R.H. The Duke of Cornwall and York (later H.M. King George V), May 9, 1901) | 1903 | Oil on canvas | 304.5 by 509.2 centimetres (119.9 in × 200.5 in) | Royal Collection. On permanent loan and exhibition at Parliament House, Canberra. | |
| | Sketch portrait of H.R.H. the Duke of Cornwall and York later King George V | 1903 | Oil on wood panel | 43 by 26.6 centimetres (16.9 in × 10.5 in) | National Library of Australia, Canberra | |
| | Portrait of Captain Neil McEacharn as a young man | 1903 | Oil on canvas | 191.7 by 100.7 centimetres (75.5 in × 39.6 in) | Queensland Art Gallery and Gallery of Modern Art, Brisbane | |
| | The towpath, Putney | 1904 | Oil on canvas | 25.3 by 40.7 centimetres (10.0 in × 16.0 in) | Kerry Stokes collection, Perth | |
| | Trafalgar Square | 1904 | Oil on cardboard | 14.0 by 28.0 centimetres (5.5 in × 11.0 in) | Art Gallery of South Australia, Adelaide | |
| | The little mother | c. 1904-c. 1905 | Oil on wood panel | 13 by 20.8 centimetres (5.1 in × 8.2 in) | National Gallery of Australia, Canberra | |
| | Australian Pastoral | 1904-05, reworked 1931 | Oil on canvas | 41.5 by 183.5 centimetres (16.3 in × 72.2 in) | National Gallery of Australia, Canberra | |
| | House of Anning Bell | 1905 | Oil on wood panel | 10.4 by 20.4 centimetres (4.1 in × 8.0 in) | National Gallery of Victoria, Melbourne | |
| | Canal scene | c. 1905 | Oil on wood | 20.3 by 12.4 centimetres (8.0 in × 4.9 in) | Art Gallery of New South Wales, Sydney | |
| | Mrs Tom Roberts | c. 1906 | Oil on canvas on hardboard | 76.8 by 54.0 centimetres (30.2 in × 21.3 in) | Art Gallery of Western Australia, Perth | |
| | Storm at sea | c. 1907 | Oil on canvas on plywood | 35.3 by 44.5 centimetres (13.9 in × 17.5 in) | Art Gallery of New South Wales, Sydney | |
| | Thames barges | c. 1909 | Oil on canvas on cardboard | 34.0 by 45.4 centimetres (13.4 in × 17.9 in) | Art Gallery of New South Wales, Sydney | |
| | Madame Hartl | 1909-10 | Oil on canvas | 114.5 by 76.6 centimetres (45.1 in × 30.2 in) | National Gallery of Australia, Canberra | |
| | Portrait of Mrs Tom Roberts | 1910 | Oil on canvas | 74.1 by 60.8 centimetres (29.2 in × 23.9 in) | National Portrait Gallery, Canberra | |
| | Copse in winter | c. 1910 | Oil on canvas on plywood | 33.5 by 43.5 centimetres (13.2 in × 17.1 in) | Private collection | |
| | Grey lady (Mrs Ince) | c. 1910-c. 1912 | Oil on canvas | 76.1 by 63.3 centimetres (30.0 in × 24.9 in) | Art Gallery of New South Wales, Sydney | |
| | Harrow Hill | c. 1910-c. 1912 | Oil on canvas on plywood | 35.5 by 46.0 centimetres (14.0 in × 18.1 in) | Art Gallery of New South Wales, Sydney | |
| | Roses | 1911 | Oil on canvas on hardboard | 51.0 by 61.0 centimetres (20.1 in × 24.0 in) | Art Gallery of New South Wales, Sydney | |
| | The First Basin, Lake Como | 1913 | Oil on canvas | 65.5 by 85 centimetres (25.8 in × 33.5 in) | Kerry Stokes collection, Perth | |
| | Kathleen, portrait study | c. 1914 | Oil on canvas on plywood | 70.9 by 66.0 centimetres (27.9 in × 26.0 in) | Queen Victoria Museum and Art Gallery, Launceston | |
| | The mirror | c. 1915 | Oil on canvas | 88.0 by 69.5 centimetres (34.6 in × 27.4 in) | Queen Victoria Museum and Art Gallery, Launceston | |
| | Girl's head | c. 1917 | Oil on canvas on cardboard | 40.3 by 35.6 centimetres (15.9 in × 14.0 in) | National Gallery of Victoria, Melbourne | |
| | Penelope | 1919 | Oil on canvas | 66.4 by 56.5 centimetres (26.1 in × 22.2 in) | National Gallery of Victoria, Melbourne | |
| | In the Dandenongs | 1920 | Oil on canvas laid down | 44.3 by 34.5 centimetres (17.4 in × 13.6 in) | University of Queensland, Brisbane | |
| | Hobart, Tasmania | c. 1920s' | Oil on canvas | 29.6 by 55.5 centimetres (11.7 in × 21.9 in) | National Gallery of Victoria, Melbourne | |
| | Poppies | 1921 | Oil on canvas | 46.0 by 33.0 centimetres (18.1 in × 13.0 in) | Private collection | |
| | Springtime in Sussex | 1921 | Oil on canvas on plywood | 35.4 by 45.3 centimetres (13.9 in × 17.8 in) | Art Gallery of New South Wales, Sydney | |
| | Mrs H. G. Potter | 1922 | Oil on canvas | 76.7 by 63.6 centimetres (30.2 in × 25.0 in) | National Gallery of Victoria, Melbourne | |
| | Morning mists on Lake Como | 1922 | Oil on canvas on composition board | 40.5 by 25.4 centimetres (15.9 in × 10.0 in) | National Gallery of Australia, Canberra | |
| | Lake Como | 1922 | Oil on canvas | 47.7 by 63.5 centimetres (18.8 in × 25.0 in) | National Gallery of Victoria, Melbourne | |
| | The first of Spring | 1922 | Oil on unprimed wood panel | 43.8 by 28 centimetres (17.2 in × 11.0 in) | National Gallery of Australia, Canberra | |
| | Washing day Kallista | c. 1923-c. 1925 | Oil on canvas on hardboard | 35.5 by 52.3 centimetres (14.0 in × 20.6 in) | Art Gallery of New South Wales, Sydney | |
| | Country Road Makers | 1923 | Oil on canvas | 72.5 by 50.3 centimetres (28.5 in × 19.8 in) | Private collection | |
| | Ploughing in the Dandenongs (The potato field) | 1924 | Oil on canvas | 61.2 by 91.8 centimetres (24.1 in × 36.1 in) | National Gallery of Australia, Canberra | |
| | The South Wind | 1924 | Oil on canvas on plywood | 35.6 by 46.0 centimetres (14.0 in × 18.1 in) | National Gallery of Australia, Canberra | |
| | Sherbrooke Forest | 1924 | Oil on canvas on paperboard | 48.0 by 68.4 centimetres (18.9 in × 26.9 in) | Art Gallery of New South Wales, Sydney | |
| | Mountain clouds | 1924 | Oil on plywood | 43.5 by 33.0 centimetres (17.1 in × 13.0 in) | National Gallery of Victoria, Melbourne | |
| | Barn Close, Diamond Creek | c. 1924 | Oil on plywood | 12.0 by 21.1 centimetres (4.7 in × 8.3 in) | National Gallery of Victoria, Melbourne | |
| | Dogging a log | c. 1924 | Oil on wood panel | 20.5 by 12.8 centimetres (8.1 in × 5.0 in) irregular | National Gallery of Victoria, Melbourne | |
| | Self portrait | 1924 | Oil on canvas | 61.2 by 51.0 centimetres (24.1 in × 20.1 in) | Art Gallery of New South Wales, Sydney | |
| | In the shadow of the hills | 1924 | Oil on plywood | 48.1 by 91.7 centimetres (18.9 in × 36.1 in) | Art Gallery of New South Wales, Sydney | |
| | Under Ben Lomond | c. 1925-c. 1927 | Oil on wood panel | 12.8 by 20.8 centimetres (5.0 in × 8.2 in) | National Gallery of Australia, Canberra | |
| | The quarry, Maria Island | 1926 | Oil on canvas | 61 by 50.5 centimetres (24.0 in × 19.9 in) | National Gallery of Australia, Canberra | |
| | A queen of gums | 1926 | Oil on canvas | 45.0 by 35.5 centimetres (17.7 in × 14.0 in) | Private collection | |
| | Wayside, Kallista | 1927 | Oil on plywood | 12.5 by 20.5 centimetres (4.9 in × 8.1 in) | Castlemaine Art Museum | |
| | Fog on the road to Yea | 1928 | Oil on canvas on cardboard | 35.5 by 46.0 centimetres (14.0 in × 18.1 in) | National Gallery of Victoria, Melbourne | |
| | Trawool landscape | 1928 | Oil on canvas on cardboard | 35.6 by 45.5 centimetres (14.0 in × 17.9 in) | Art Gallery of New South Wales, Sydney | |
| | Glover's country, Tasmania | c. 1929 | Oil on plywood | 27.0 by 43.5 centimetres (10.6 in × 17.1 in) | Tasmanian Museum and Art Gallery, Hobart | |
| | Sunrise, Tasmania | 1929 | Oil on panel | 10.0 by 24.5 centimetres (3.9 in × 9.6 in) | Art Gallery of South Australia, Adelaide | |
