= Charcoal burners =

Painting by Tom Roberts

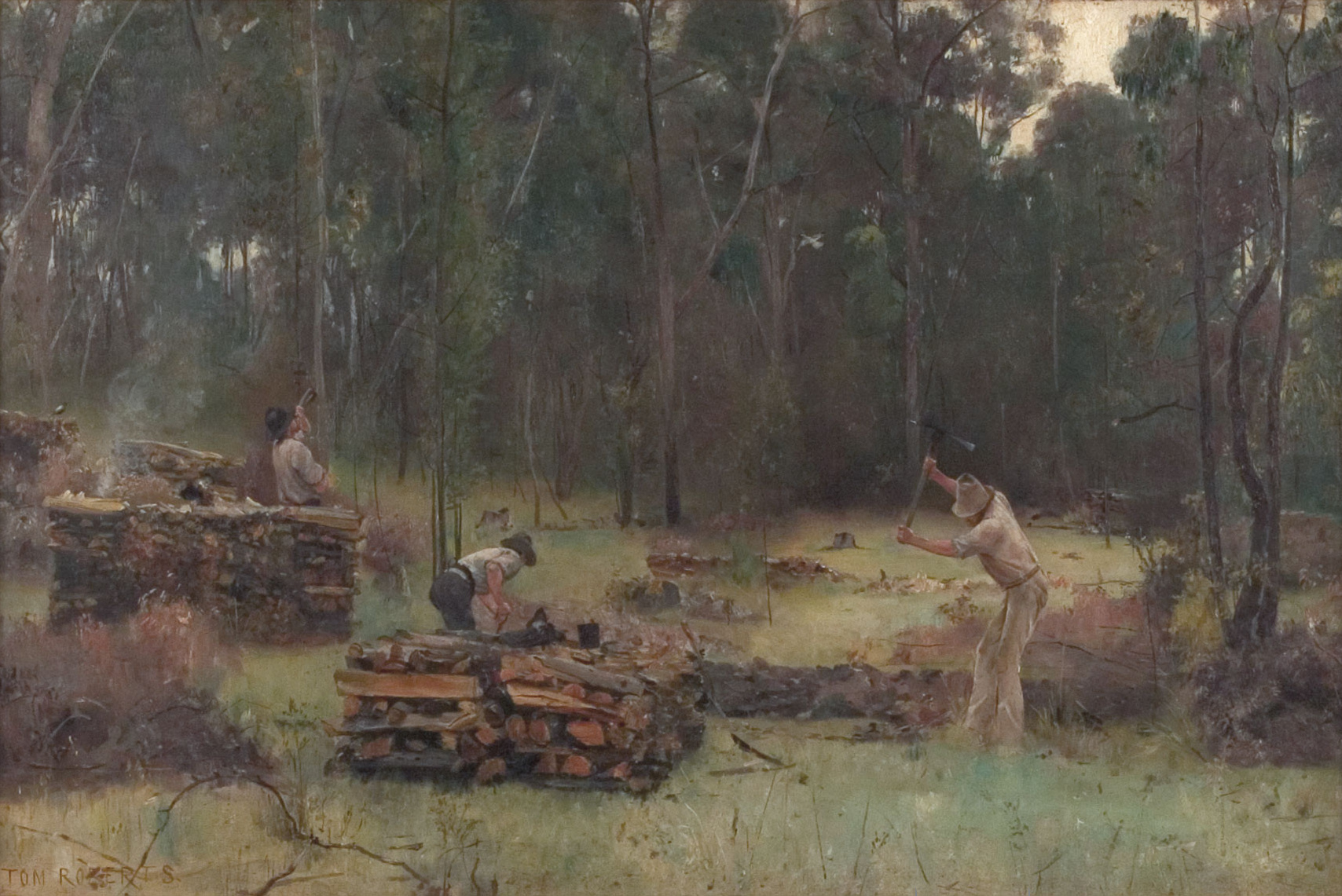
- Artist: Tom Roberts
- Year: 1886
- Medium: oil on canvas
- Dimensions: 61.4 cm × 92.3 cm (24.2 in × 36.3 in)
- Location: Art Gallery of Ballarat; Ballarat

Charcoal burners (previously known as Wood splitters) is an 1886 painting by the Australian artist Tom Roberts. The painting depicts three rural labourers "splitting and stacking timber for the preparation of charcoal". Roberts, influenced by the Barbizon school and Jules Bastien-Lepage, would later return to the theme of rural men working in his works A break away! and Shearing the Rams.

Roberts painted the picture from sketches made at a camp he made with Frederick McCubbin at Box Hill, then a rural locality east of Melbourne.

The painting was acquired by the Art Gallery of Ballarat in 1961.

The work was stolen from the gallery in 1978. A ransom was paid the following year for the safe recovery of the painting from a park in Sydney.

== See also ==
- List of paintings by Tom Roberts
