= The Sunny South =

The Sunny South may refer to:

- The Sunny South (magazine), an American literary magazine
- The Sunny South (painting), an 1887 painting by Australian artist Tom Roberts
- The Sunny South or The Whirlwind of Fate, a 1915 Australian silent film

== See also ==
- Sunny South (disambiguation)
