= The Sunny South (painting) =

Painting by Tom Roberts

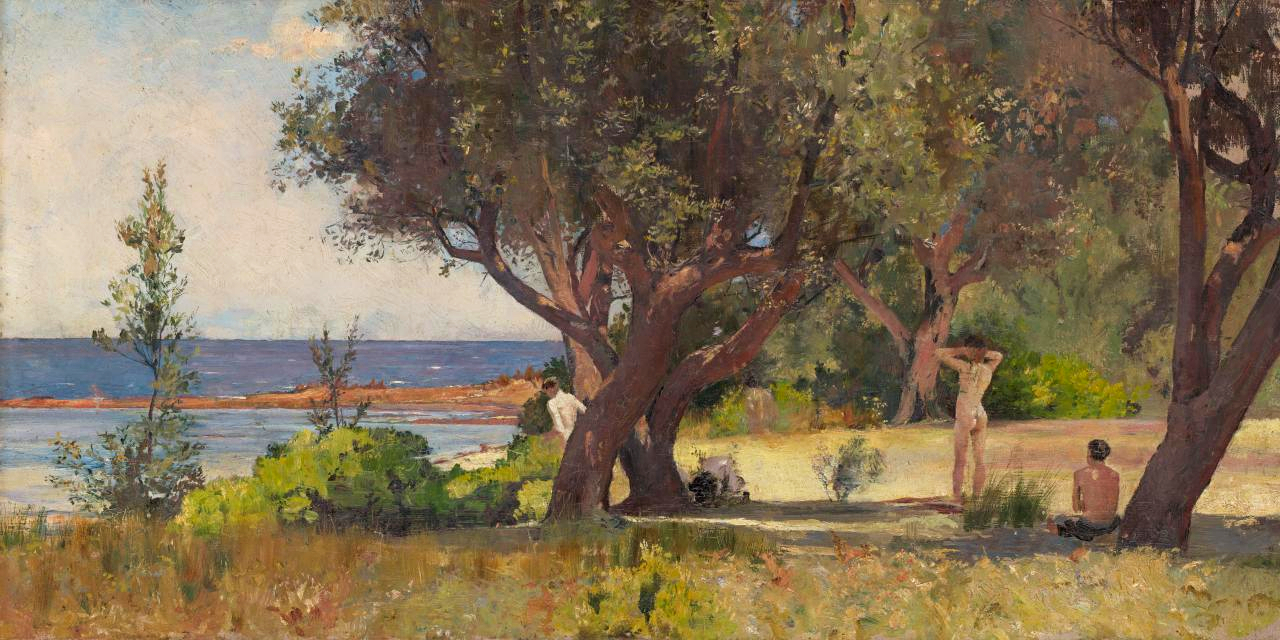
- Artist: Tom Roberts
- Year: 1887
- Medium: oil on canvas
- Dimensions: 30.8 cm × 61.4 cm (12.1 in × 24.2 in)
- Location: National Gallery of Victoria; Melbourne

The Sunny South is an 1887 painting by the Australian artist Tom Roberts. The painting depicts a group of boys swimming naked at Ricketts Point at Beaumaris, Victoria, a suburb of Melbourne.

The painting was acquired by the National Gallery of Victoria in 1940 with funds from the Felton Bequest.

The title appears to be a triple entendre. The title refers to the popular show titled The Sunny South, which was a popular play first produced in Melbourne by George Darrell and starring Essie Jenyns in 1883, four years before the painting was finished, then taken to London. Ricketts Point, Beaumaris, is a seaside suburb to the south of Melbourne particularly popular during summertime. The third reference could be to the exposed backside of the central figure in the painting.

== See also ==
- List of paintings by Tom Roberts
