= Bourke Street (painting) =

Painting by Tom Roberts

Bourke Street (Allegro con brio)
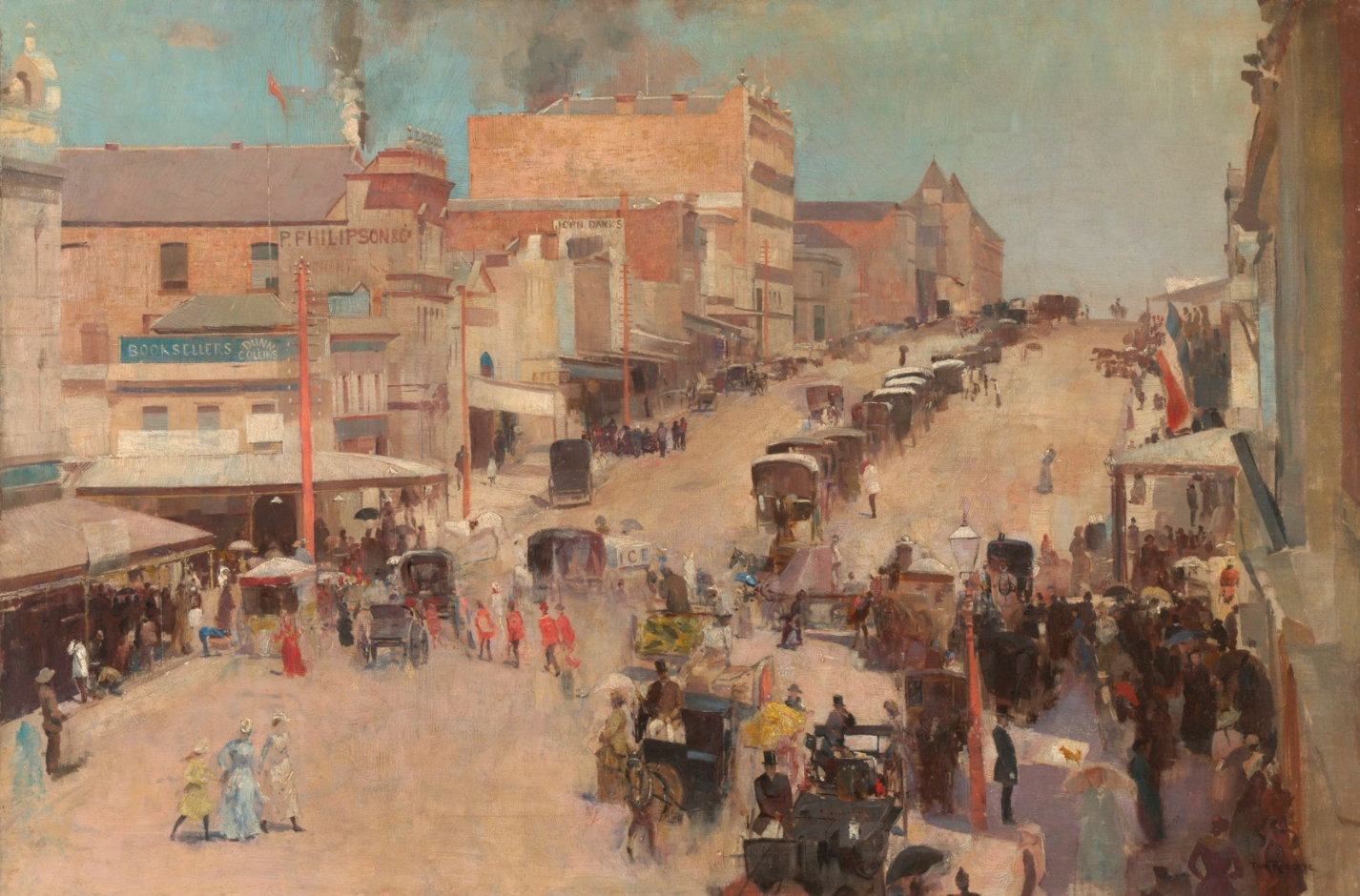
- Artist: Tom Roberts
- Year: 1886
- Type: oil on canvas on composition board
- Dimensions: 51.2 cm × 76.7 cm (20.2 in × 30.2 in)
- Location: National Gallery of Australia; Canberra

Bourke Street is an 1886 painting by Australian artist Tom Roberts. Roberts originally titled the work Allegro con brio. The painting depicts the western end of Bourke Street, one of the main thoroughfares in Melbourne as seen from the Buckley & Nunn drapery (the present-day David Jones building).

The work was painted a few months after Roberts' return to Australia in 1885, after he had spent four years in Europe . It was not displayed until 1890, and only five days beforehand, Roberts added three female figures to the lower left. Roberts was unable to find a buyer and handed the painting to fellow artist, Frederick McCubbin. In 1920, McCubbin's widow sold the painting to the Commonwealth Parliamentary Library for 20 guineas—forwarding the proceeds to Roberts, who was in London at the time.

== See also ==
- List of paintings by Tom Roberts
