= Sunny South =

Sunny South may refer to:

- Sunny South, Alabama
- Sunny South (clipper), an American sailing ship
- The Sunny South (magazine), a literary magazine published in Atlanta, Georgia

== See also ==
- The Sunny South (disambiguation)
