= Coming South =

Painting by Tom Roberts

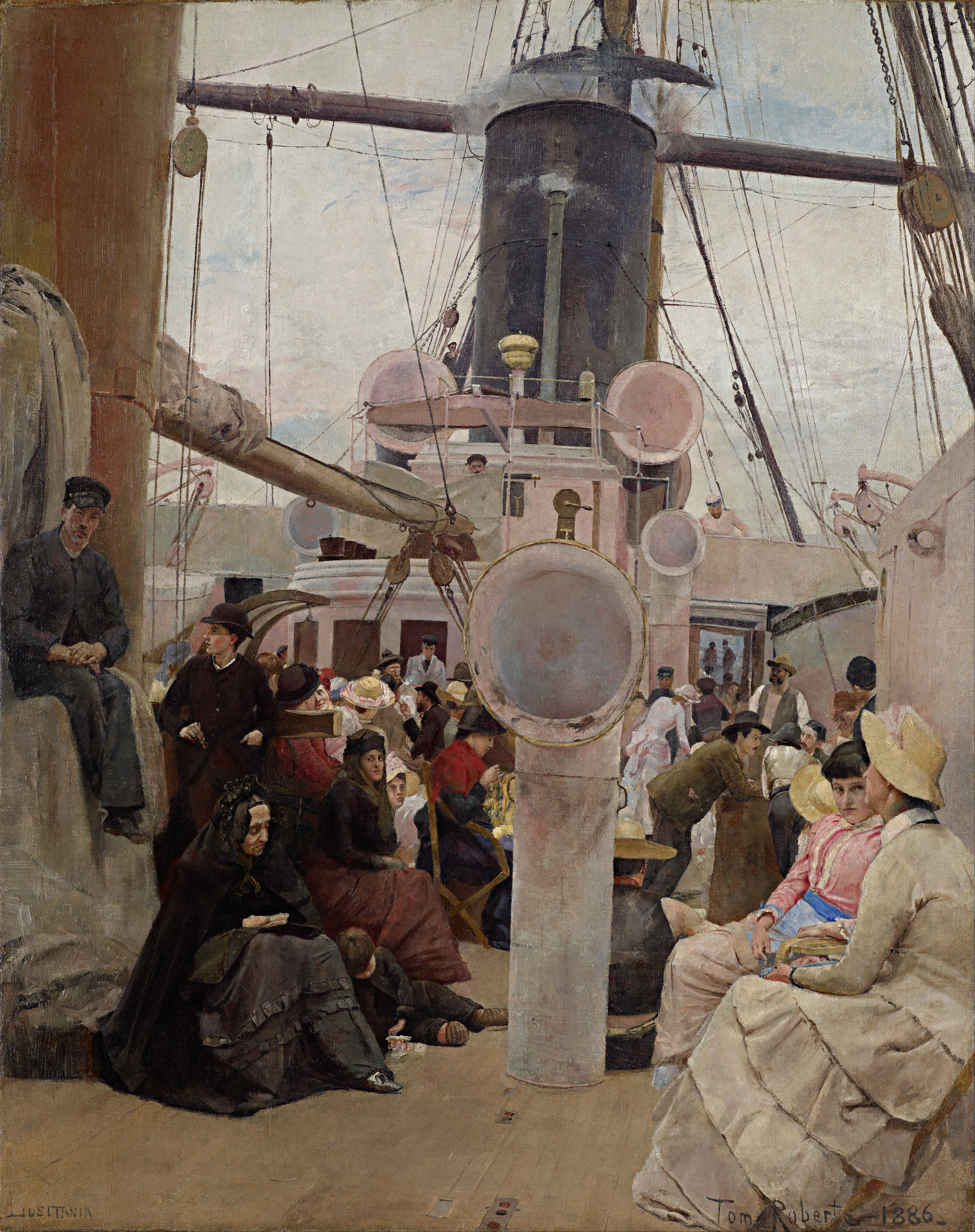
- Artist: Tom Roberts
- Year: 1886
- Medium: oil on canvas
- Dimensions: 63.5 cm × 52.2 cm (25.0 in × 20.6 in)
- Location: National Gallery of Victoria, Melbourne

Coming South is an 1886 painting by the Australian artist Tom Roberts. The painting depicts migrants coming to Australia from Europe aboard a steamship. Roberts based the painting on sketches he had made when returning to Australia aboard the SS Lusitania in 1885 after four years abroad in Europe.

Historian Humphrey McQueen describes Coming South as one of Roberts' seven best-known paintings. The National Gallery of Victoria describes it as "a definitive image of the migrant experience" and "Roberts's first exploration of one of the great themes of Australian life".

The painting was acquired by the National Gallery of Victoria in 1967.

== See also ==
- List of paintings by Tom Roberts
