= The Big Picture (painting) =

Painting by Tom Roberts

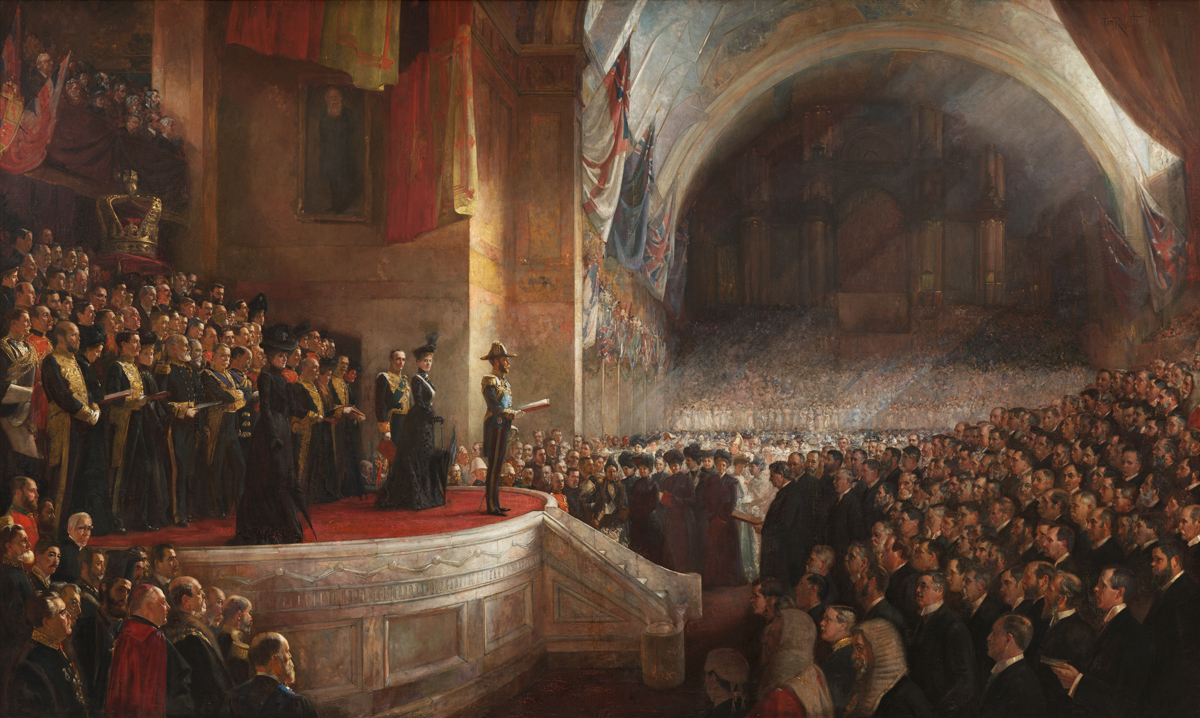
- Artist: Tom Roberts
- Year: 1903
- Medium: oil on canvas
- Dimensions: 304.5 cm × 509.2 cm (119.9 in × 200.5 in)
- Location: Parliament House; Canberra

The Opening of the First Parliament of the Commonwealth of Australia by H.R.H. The Duke of Cornwall and York, May 9, 1901, more commonly known in Australia as The Big Picture, is a 1903 painting by the Australian artist Tom Roberts. The painting, measuring 304.5 by 509.2 centimetres (119.9 in × 200.5 in), or roughly 10 by 17 feet, depicts the opening of the first Parliament of Australia at the Royal Exhibition Building in Melbourne on 9 May 1901 by Prince George, Duke of Cornwall and York.

The painting is part of the Royal Collection but has been on permanent loan to the Parliament of Australia since 1957. The work, currently on display in Parliament House, Canberra, has been described by Andrew Mackenzie as "...undoubtedly the principal work of art recording Australia's Parliamentary History."

== Background ==
On 1 January 1901, after decades of debates and negotiations, the colonies on the Australian continent formed a federation. While the new Constitution of Australia called for a new capital to be constructed, away from the major cities, Melbourne was chosen to act as the temporary seat of government. Elections were held for the first Parliament of Australia and on 9 May 1901, the new parliament was sworn in at the Royal Exhibition Building in Melbourne.

The opening of the new parliament was seen as a historic and momentous occasion with King Edward VII's son, the Duke of Cornwall and York (later George V) coming to Australia to officially open the new parliament on behalf of the King. To appropriately capture the occasion, the "Australian Art Association", a consortium of private benefactors, sought to commission a painting of the event as a "gift to the nation". Their motives were not entirely altruistic; the consortium hoped to profit by selling prints. Roberts was not the consortium's first choice, with J. C. Waite initially preferred.

== Composition ==
Although not commissioned on the day of the opening, Roberts had received an approach from the consortium and so attended the ceremony to take photographs and sketches. Two weeks after the event, after the consortium were turned down by Waite, Roberts was formally commissioned to produce the painting. The contract initially was for 650 guineas but this was increased to 1000 guineas when the scope of the work was realised. Roberts was also paid one guinea for each subject's sketch plus expenses; in all he received over 2000 guineas for the work, the equivalent of some AUS$323,000 in 2020. The contract required Roberts to include at least 250 recognisable likenesses in the finished work, including the Duke and Duchess of Cornwall and York, the Governor General, each State Governor, Members of the new Commonwealth Parliament and other distinguished guests.

When the great day came your mother and I went to the hall of the Exhibition Building, and without getting seats, walked quietly at the very back, and climbing up some rails, I was able to see that immense gathering of people from Australia, and from so many parts of the world. It was very solemn and great. The heads on the floor looked like a landscape.

— Tom Roberts, writing to his son Caleb

Roberts started to work on the painting in a room provided at the Royal Exhibition Building. He was supported by Carl Pinschof, who worked as a kind of secretary to Roberts in order to help him. The painting was made in three flax panels to enable it to be folded for transportation. He travelled to Sydney and many other places to make sketches of the attendees as well as working from photographs. He asked his subjects for "measurements" to ensure accuracy—age, height, weight, hat size and even place of birth. In all, the picture included 269 separate portraits. Rumours spread that Roberts was paid by some of these dignitaries to ensure they were placed in a more prominent location.

Most of the delegates at the ceremony wore black, still observing a period of mourning after the recent death of Queen Victoria. To balance this Roberts gave some emphasis to the choir, who were dressed in white. A shaft of light focused on the Duke reading the King's proclamation also provides some colour; this phenomenon was remarked upon by contemporary newspaper reports. Artistic licence was taken with the dais shown as much higher that it actually was and some other architectural features of the building either downplayed or ignored. Roberts also honoured the "Father of Federation", Henry Parkes, who had died five years previous. He added a portrait of Parkes in the form of a painting above the dais, this painting was not there on the day.

Roberts took the painting to London—where many of the attendees lived—to complete, using the South African Room of the Imperial Institute as his workspace. The painting was finished on 16 November 1903; in all, it took Roberts two and a half years to complete. It was then taken to Paris where photogravure reproductions were made for sale to the public, with Roberts signing 500 of them. Roberts did not sign the actual painting.

== History ==
The painting was first exhibited in the Royal Academy in London before being presented to King Edward VII by the Commonwealth Government in 1904. It was then moved to St. James's Palace where it remained on display until 1957. That year, Robert Menzies, the Prime Minister of Australia requested the permanent loan of the painting from Queen Elizabeth II. The Queen consented and the picture returned to Australia in 1958.

The picture was to be exhibited in the King's Hall of the then Parliament House with the other historic records of events as the opening of the first Parliament in Canberra in 1927 and the Royal opening of Parliament in 1954, however it was too big for the available space. The decision was made to store the painting at the Australian War Memorial after a tour of the various state galleries. In 1969, the painting was moved to the Parliament House basement where it remained until 1980.

As a result of its travels, the picture had deteriorated considerably and required major restoration work.

The picture had long been unprotected from changes in temperature and humidity, it had been constantly rolled and unrolled and untacked from its stretcher frame. At one stage it was even folded in half for transport. All this seriously affected the canvas. It gradually sagged, undulated and malformed and was in danger of becoming completely dilapidated.

— Katrina Rumley, quoted in Mackenzie.

The School of Materials Conservation at the Canberra College of Advanced Education started restoration work in 1980. The work included infra-red and ultra-violet photography to determine the condition of the painting followed by removal of old varnish and grime, repairs to the tacking margin and restoration of some small areas of paint. The work was completed in time for it to be taken to the new High Court of Australia building for its official opening by the Queen in 1981.

The designers of the new Parliament House were mindful of the need to provide an appropriate space to display The Big Picture in the new building. The Joint Standing Committee responsible for the new building made the decision to place the painting in the Main Committee Room Foyer. The architects worked to ensure that major design elements in the room such as the skylight and balustrade around the work allowed for the integration of the painting with the available space. Because the fragile state of the picture prevented it from being rolled, moving the painting from the High Court to Parliament House was a major logistical exercise. The move required removal of some windows at the High Court, the construction of a special carrying frame and scaffolding and a system of winches to support the picture in place. The painting remains in this specially designed location.

On the occasion of the centenary of Federation in 2001, the Premier of Victoria, Steve Bracks, led a call for ownership of the painting to be formally transferred from the British Royal Collection to the Australian Crown. This was opposed as being both impracticable and unnecessary, as the Queen or her successors were unlikely to request its return.

== Legacy ==
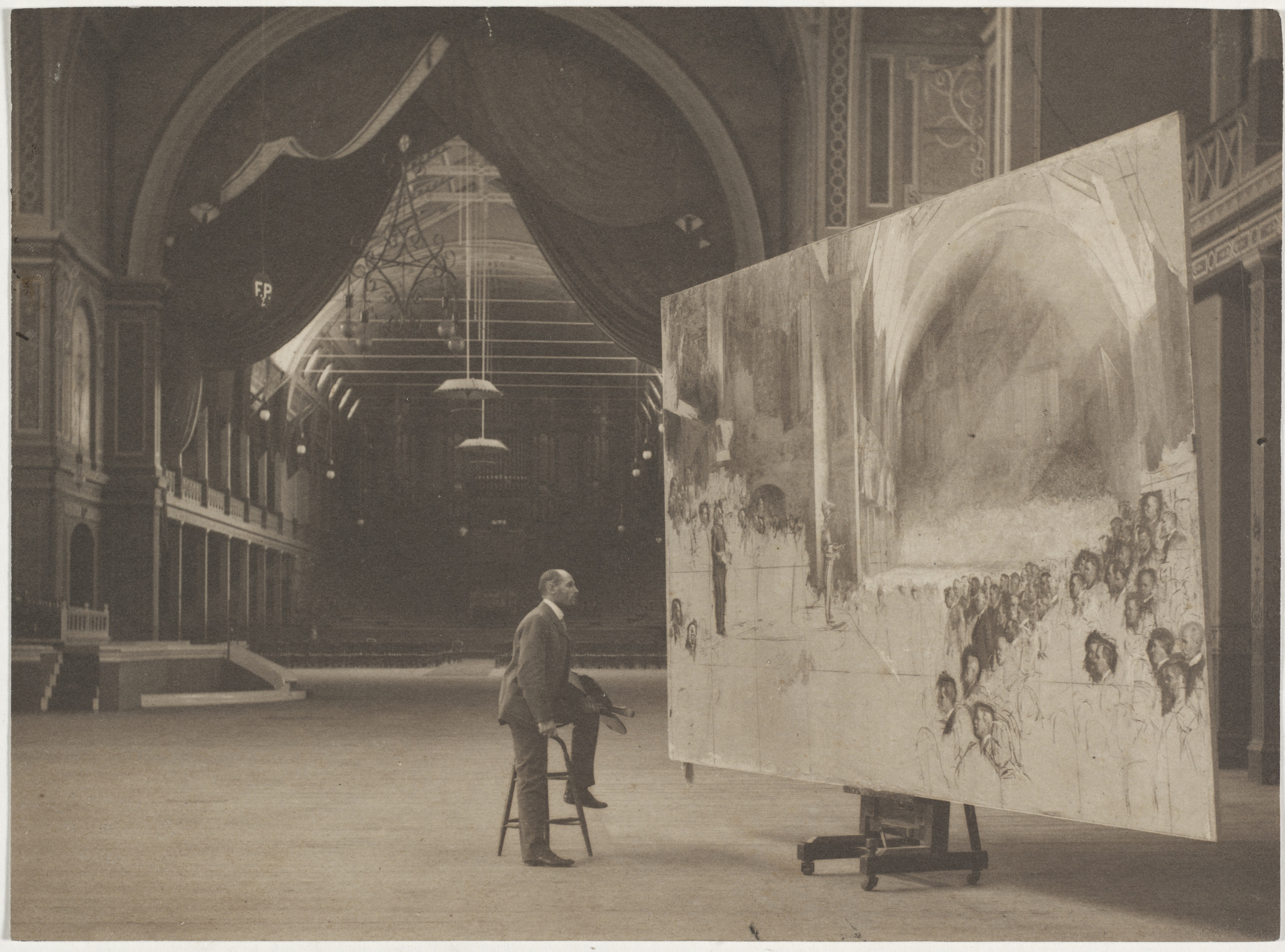
Roberts working on the painting at the Royal Exhibition Building

The effort of creating such a monumental picture—Roberts nicknamed it "The Big Picture"—took its toll on the artist. Nicknamed "Bulldog", he drew a picture of a bulldog escaping a collar and chain in a letter he wrote informing that the picture was near completion. He described the painting once as his "Frankenstein of 17 feet." Roberts's eyesight was weakened by the strain in representing so many likenesses accurately and the importance that he placed on the task sapped his strength. The biographer Humphrey McQueen claims the picture gave Roberts "an inflated idea of [his] own importance".

[P]oliticians called at his studio to pose for their portraits, royalty dropped in, and he became personal friends with Deakin. He thought fame and more commissions would now come his way in England.

— Humphrey McQueen,

However, Roberts never established himself as an artist in England and slipped into depression. The completion of the painting is generally seen as a turning point in his artistic career, after which his work never again reached the same heights. Roberts' family rejects this consensus as a "myth", with his great-granddaughter, artist Lisa Roberts, stating "His son, my grandfather, Caleb, documented that for a year he was depressed which isn't surprising after a huge commission like that that took him away from the thing he loved most which was the landscape. But after that, he went back to it. He continued to paint but not with the desire to be rich and famous."

The work itself was considered a worthy record of the event but not a masterpiece. It has, however, become the best known pictorial record of the historic occasion, and a national icon. The cartoonist Bill Leak's homage, The big picture.... with apologies to Tom Roberts, won the 1997 Walkley Award for best artwork. Robert Hannaford was commissioned to create a companion piece to celebrate the centenary of Federation in 2001.

== See also ==
- List of paintings by Tom Roberts
