= A Break Away! =

Painting by Tom Roberts

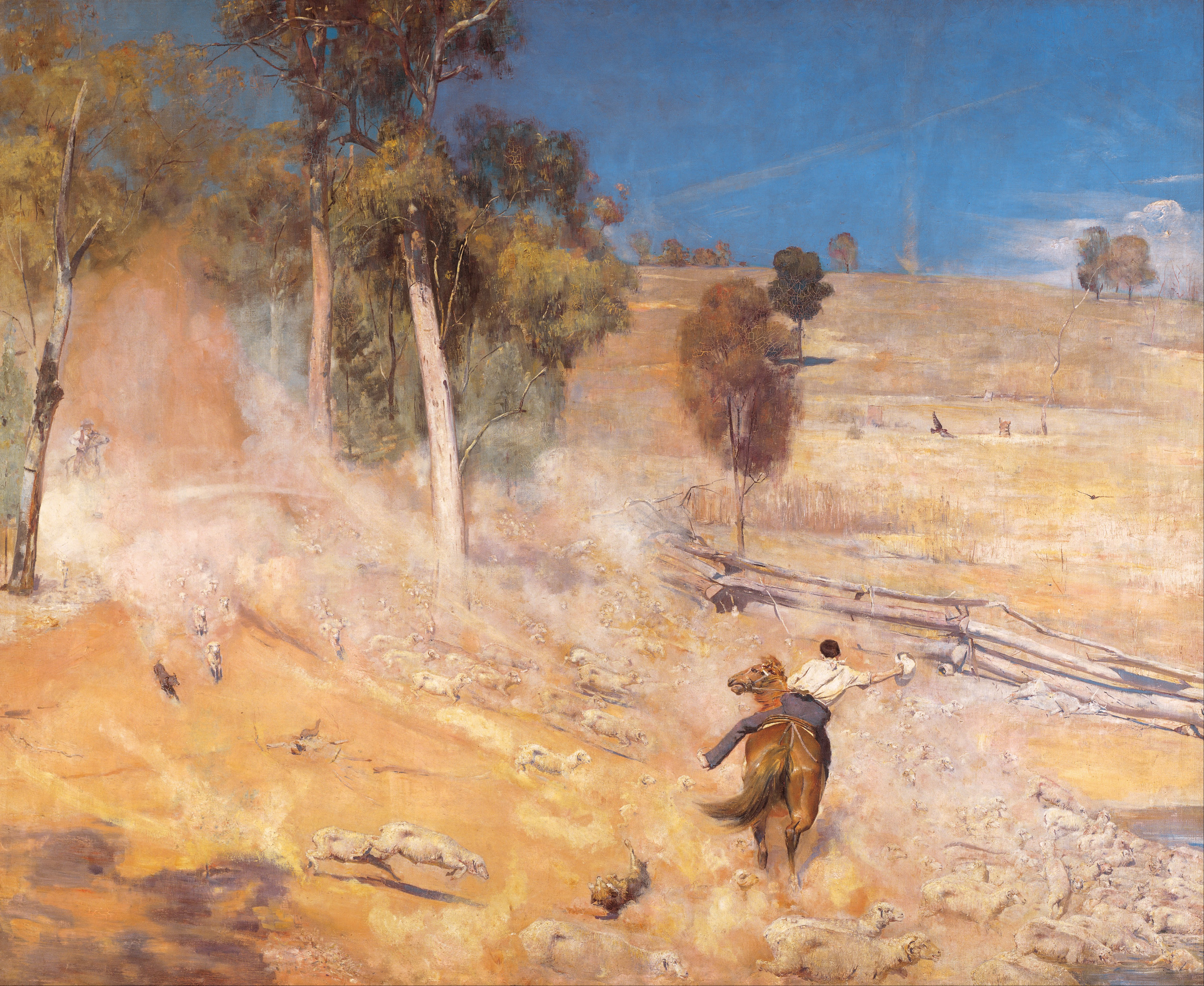
- Artist: Tom Roberts
- Year: 1891
- Medium: oil on canvas
- Dimensions: 137.3 cm × 167.8 cm (54.1 in × 66.1 in)
- Location: Art Gallery of South Australia, Adelaide

A Break Away! is an 1891 painting by Australian artist Tom Roberts.

== Description ==
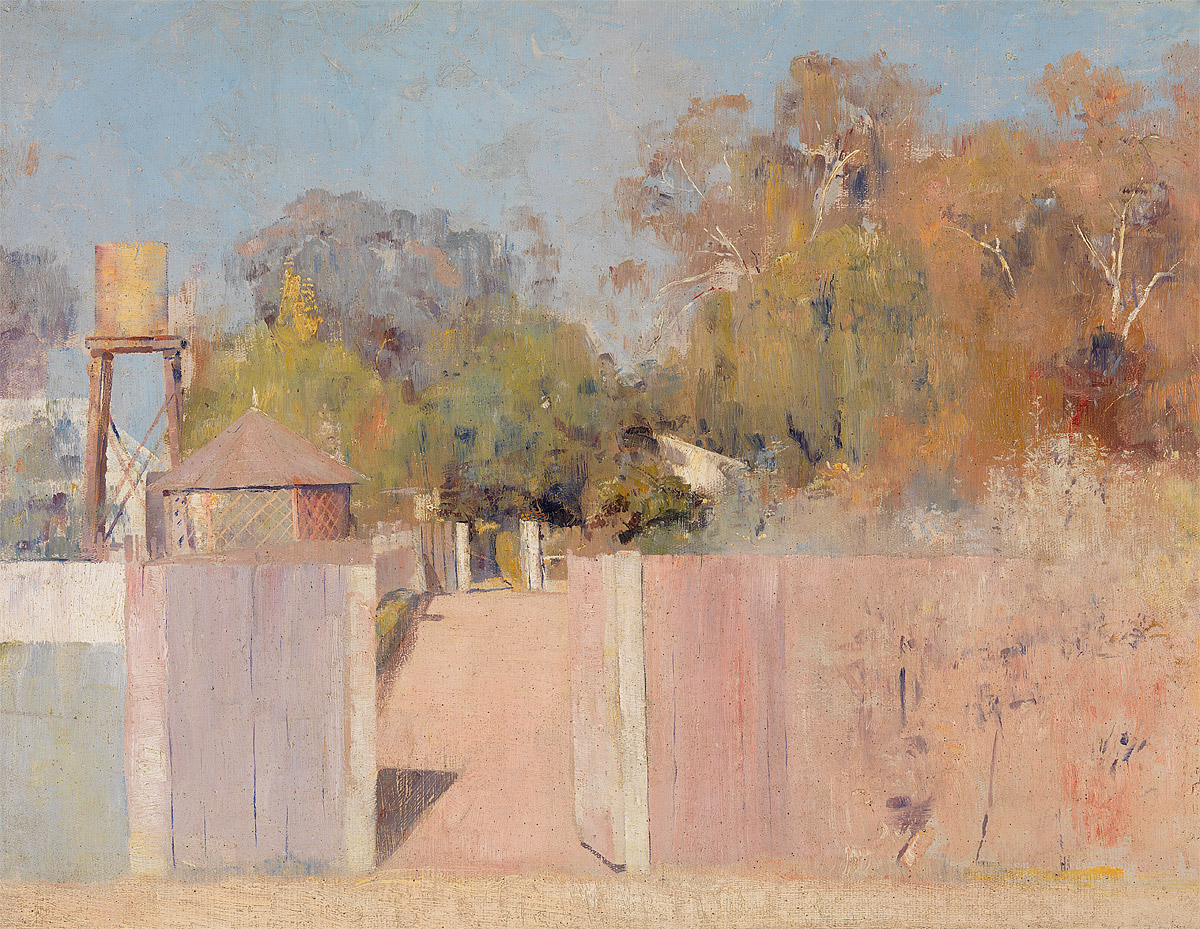
Roberts' 1891 painting of Collendina Station, Corowa, where he began work on A break away!

The painting depicts a mob of thirsty sheep stampeding towards a dam. A drover on horseback is attempting to turn the mob before they drown or crush each other in their desire to drink. The painting, an "icon of Australian art", is part of a series of works by Roberts that "captures what was an emerging spirit of national identity."

Roberts painted the work at Corowa. The painting depicts a time of drought, with little grass and the soil kicked up as dust. The work itself is a reflection on the pioneering days of the pastoral industry, which were coming to an end by the 1890s. Arthur Streeton recalled years later: "To paint that masterpiece [A break away!], Roberts travelled for six weeks with the drovers."

== Exhibition history and provenance ==
The painting formed part of the 1898 Exhibition of Australian Art in London, the first major exhibition of Australian art internationally.

A break away! is now part of the collection of the Art Gallery of South Australia having been purchased in 1899. It was included in Quintessence Editions Ltd.'s 2007 book 1001 Paintings You Must See Before You Die.

== See also ==
- List of paintings by Tom Roberts
