= Tom Roberts =

Australian artist (1856–1931)

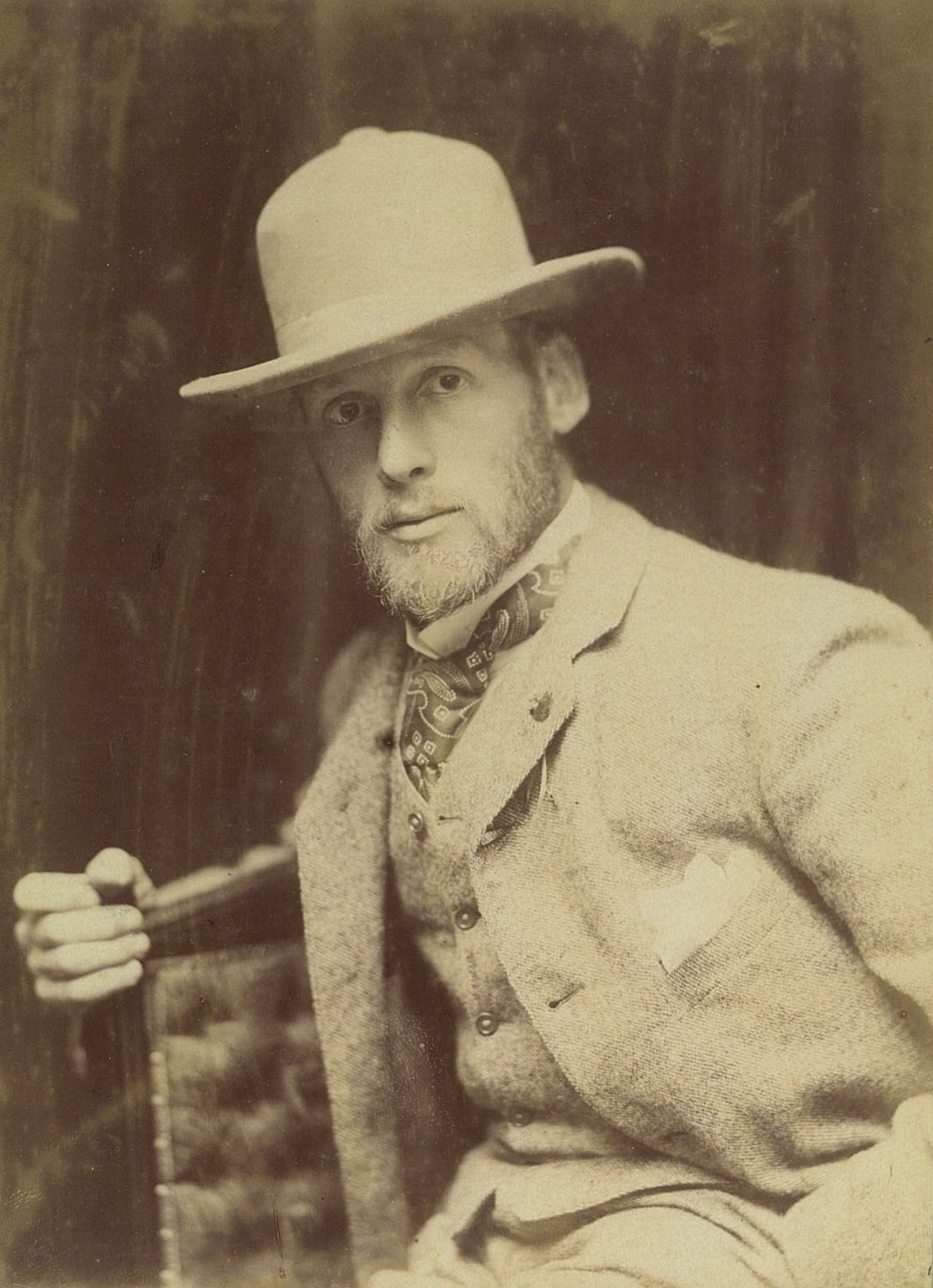
- Roberts, c. 1895
- Born: Thomas William Roberts; 8 March 1856; Dorchester, Dorset, England
- Died: 14 September 1931 (aged 75); Kallista, Victoria, Australia
- Resting place: Illawarra churchyard, near Longford, Tasmania
- Occupation: Artist
- Spouses: Elizabeth (Lillie) Williamson (m. 1896–1928) Jean Boyes (m. 1928)

Thomas William Roberts (8 March 1856 – 14 September 1931) was an English-born Australian artist and a key member of the Heidelberg School art movement, also known as Australian impressionism.

After studying in Melbourne, he travelled to Europe in 1881 to further his training, and returned home in 1885, "primed with whatever was the latest in art". That year, he joined Frederick McCubbin in founding the Box Hill artists' camp, the first of several plein air camps frequented by members of the Heidelberg School. Together with Arthur Streeton and Charles Conder, they staged the 1889 9 by 5 Impression Exhibition, Australia's first self-consciously avant-garde art exhibition.

Nicknamed "Bulldog" due to his tenacity and drive, Roberts was considered the primary force behind the Heidelberg School movement. He encouraged other artists to capture the national life of Australia, and while he is best known today for his "national narratives"—among them Shearing the Rams (1890), A break away! (1891) and Bailed Up (1895)—he earned a living as a society portraitist, and was the first person to push for Australia to have its own National Portrait Gallery. In 1903, he completed the commissioned work The Big Picture, the most famous visual representation of the first Australian Parliament.

== Biography ==
=== Family and early life ===
Roberts was born in Dorchester, Dorset, England, although some mystery surrounds his actual birthdate: his birth certificate says 8 March 1856, whereas his tombstone is inscribed 9 March. His father was Richard Roberts, a journalist, and his mother was Matilda née Evans Roberts. He had two younger siblings.

When his father died, Matilda migrated with her family to Australia in 1869 to live with relatives. Settling in Collingwood, a suburb of Melbourne, Victoria, Roberts worked as a photographer's assistant through the 1870s, while studying art at night under Swiss-born landscape painter Louis Buvelot and befriending others who were to become prominent artists, notably Frederick McCubbin.

=== Travels and studies in Europe ===
During this period, his mother had remarried to a man with whom Roberts did not get along. He decided to further his art studies, and returned to England for three years of full-time art study at the Royal Academy Schools from 1881 to 1884. He traveled in Spain in 1883 with Australian artist John Russell and future politician William Maloney, where he met Spanish artists Laureano Barrau and Ramon Casas, who introduced him to the principles of impressionism and plein air painting. While in London and Paris, he took in the progressing influence of painters Jules Bastien-Lepage and James Abbott McNeill Whistler.

=== Leader of the Heidelberg School movement ===
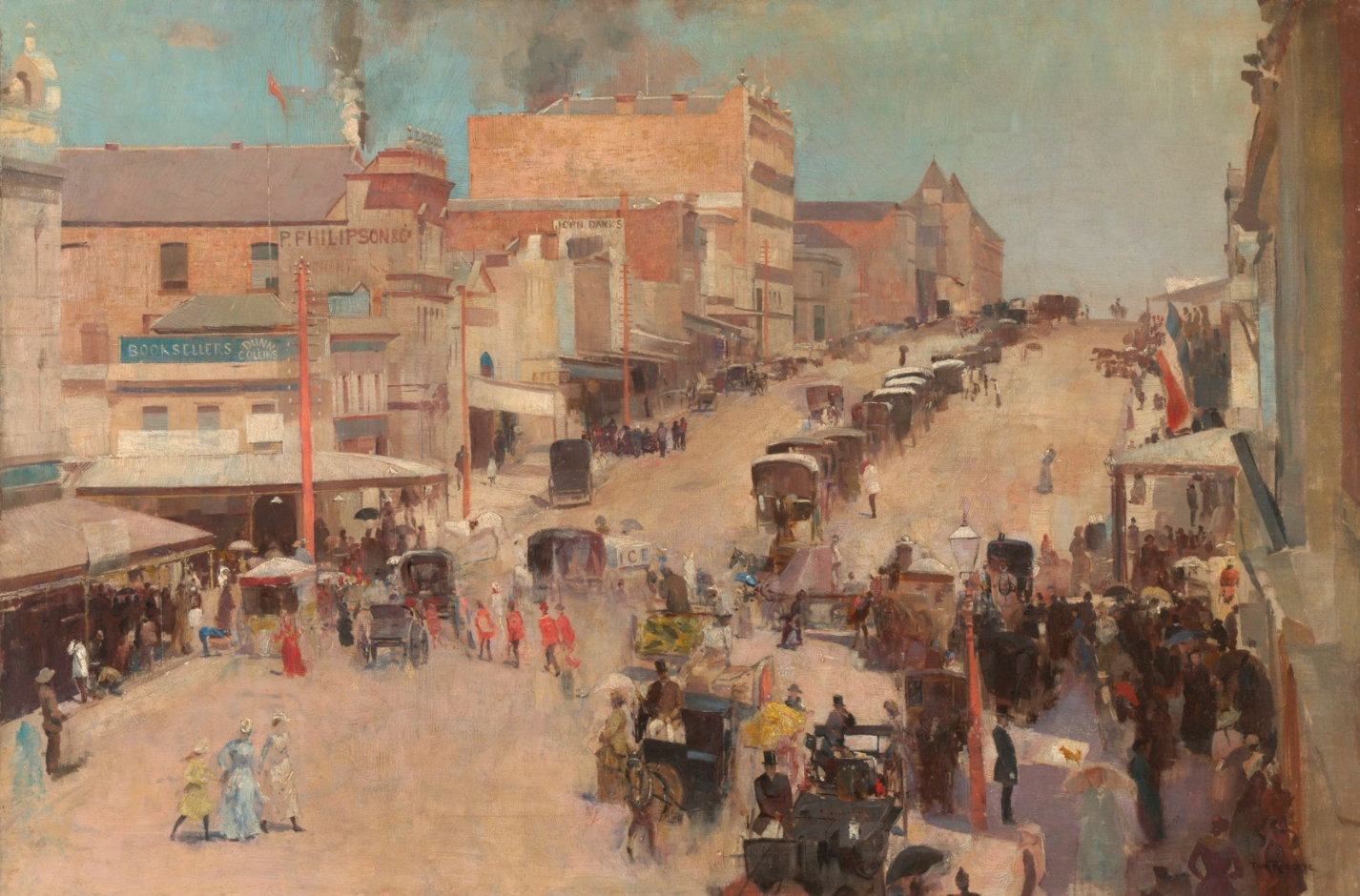
Allegro con brio: Bourke Street west, 1886, Roberts' first major work after returning to Australia

From 1884 and through to February 1892, Roberts worked again in Victoria, and became a prominent member of the bohemian artists' society the Buonarotti Club, adopting its habit of dress with a red satin lined opera cape and a 'crush topper,' though also advocating that professional artists be put in charge of the Club's exhibition activities; so instituted a selection panel of Frederick McCubbin, Louis Abrahams, John Mather, Jane Sutherland and himself, who would select and hang the works and provide exhibitors with constructive feedback.

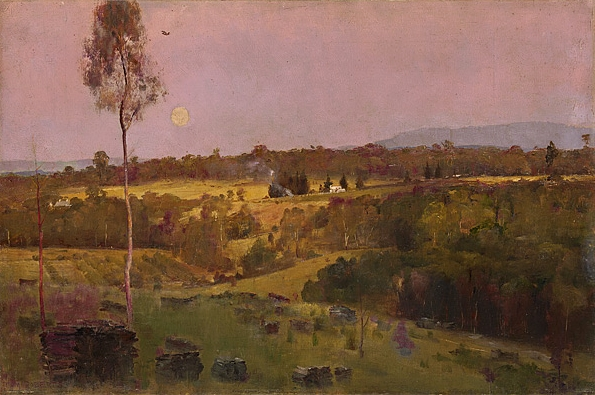
When the quiet east flushes faintly at the sun's last look (1887), painted at the Box Hill artists' camp

In the summer of 1885–86, Roberts began establishing "artists' camps" on the outskirts of Melbourne for the purpose of capturing en plein air the rural life and native bushland of Australia, as well as its light, heat, space and distance. At the first of these camps, the Box Hill artists' camp (now in suburban Box Hill) he initially worked alongside McCubbin and Abrahams before they were joined by other artists. The Box Hill railway station had been completed only a few years earlier, allowing for convenient access to the Australian bush. The following summer, the trio established a second camp at bayside Mentone, a popular holiday spot. On Mentone Beach, they met and befriended the young Arthur Streeton, who was then painting en plein air. Streeton became a frequent visitor to the artists' camps and a protege of Roberts, who taught him impressionistic techniques. From 1888, Roberts rented a studio in Grosvenor Chambers, at 9 Collins Street, Melbourne's first purpose-built complex of art studios. The architects consulted Roberts on the design of the building, to ensure ideal lighting. At Grosvenor Chambers, Roberts became one of Melbourne's most fashionable portraitists.

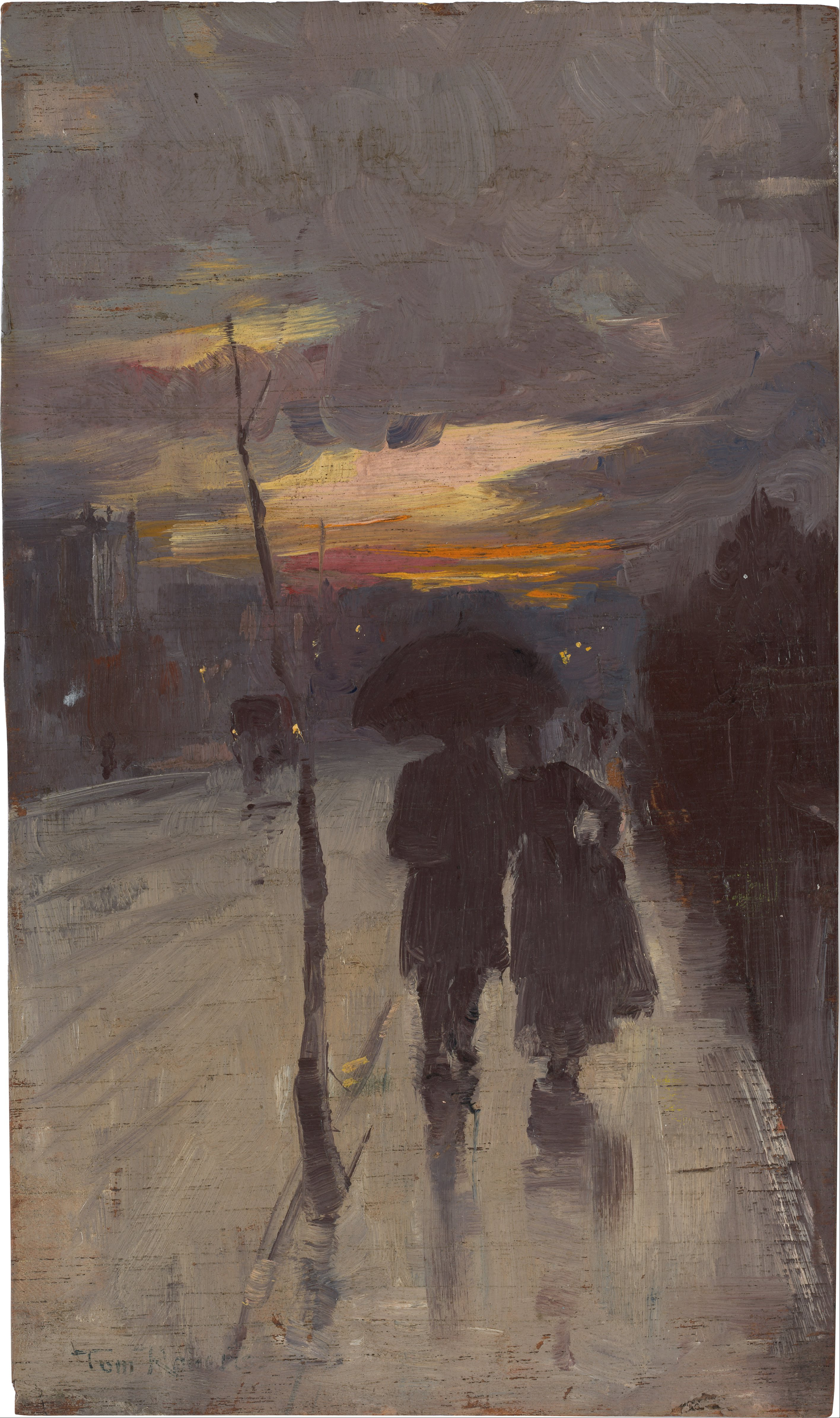
Going home (1889), exhibited at the 9 by 5 Impression Exhibition

Another meeting of importance was with Charles Conder, who Roberts befriended during a visit to Sydney in 1888. They painted en plein air together, creating companion views of Coogee Beach, and discussed impressionist techniques, which Conder had also picked up from expatriate artist G. P. Nerli. In October 1888, Conder followed Roberts to Melbourne, at first staying at his studio at Grosvenor Chambers.

During the summer of 1888–89, Roberts and Conder joined Streeton at his Heidelberg artists' camp, and began organising an exhibition of "impressions" they painted upon wooden cigar box lids, supplied by Abrahams, manager of the cigar business Sniders & Abrahams. In doing so, the artists sought to capture the fleeting effects of nature in a spontaneous manner, and were intent on officially establishing themselves as "impressionists" and thus the vanguard of Australian art. The exhibition, named the 9 by 5 Impression Exhibition (in reference to the 9 x 5 inch dimensions of the lids), was held in August and September 1889, at Buxton's Rooms. Roberts was the main exhibitor with 63 "impressions", followed by Conder and Streeton. McCubbin and Charles Douglas Richardson also accepted invitations to join the exhibition. It proved to be a succès de scandale, attracting scorn from a number of art critics, who dismissed impressionism as a fad. Today it is considered a landmark event in Australian art history, and the first independent exhibition of the Heidelberg School movement, named after the location of the aforementioned artists' camp. Due to his age, tenacity and influence, Roberts was considered the movement's de facto leader. Upon moving to Europe in 1890, Conder wrote to Roberts, saying, "If there is any distinct school in Melbourne, ... it's entirely due to you."

When a severe economic depression hit Melbourne in 1890, Roberts and Streeton relocated to Sydney, where they continued to paint en plein air at artists' camps, including Curlew Camp and other camps around Sydney Harbour. From Sydney, both artists travelled into the rural districts of New South Wales, where they painted most of their iconic "national" pictures. For Roberts, these themes were reinforced by his association with members of Sydney's nationalist Bulletin School of literature, centered around the periodical The Bulletin.

=== Personal life and final years ===
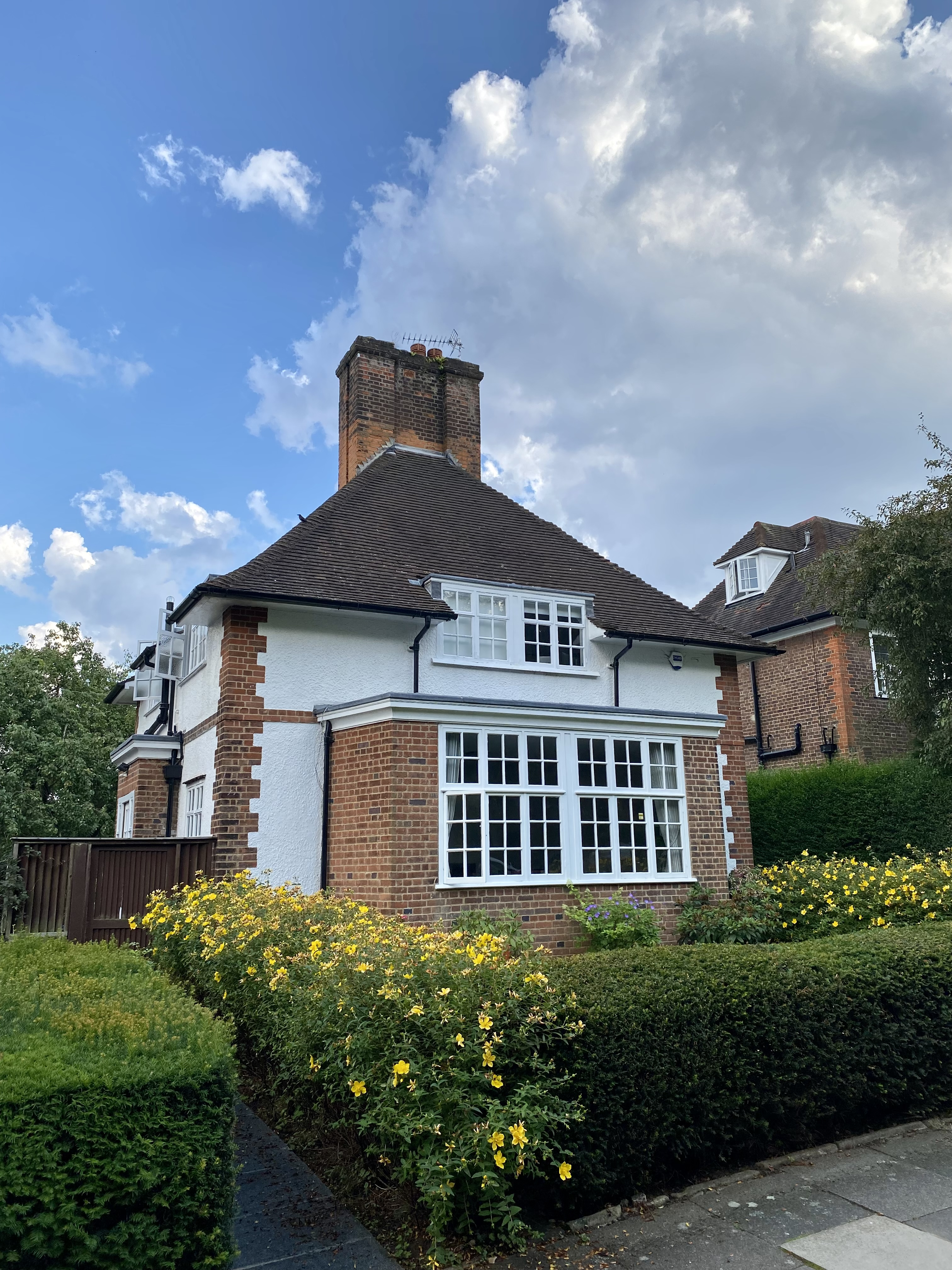
Residence in Hampstead Garden Suburb, designed for Roberts by Thomas Geoffry Lucas in 1910

In 1896, he married 36-year-old Elizabeth (Lillie) Williamson and they had a son, Caleb. Lillie Roberts was an expert maker of picture frames, and during the period 1903–1914, when Roberts painted relatively little, much of the family's income apparently came from Lillie's work. Roberts spent World War I in England assisting at a hospital. Back in Australia, he built a house at Kallista, near Melbourne. Elizabeth died in January 1928, and Roberts remarried, to Jean Boyes, in August 1928. He died in 1931 of cancer in Kallista. His ashes are buried in the churchyard at Illawarra near Longford, Tasmania, one of his favourite painting spots.

== Work ==
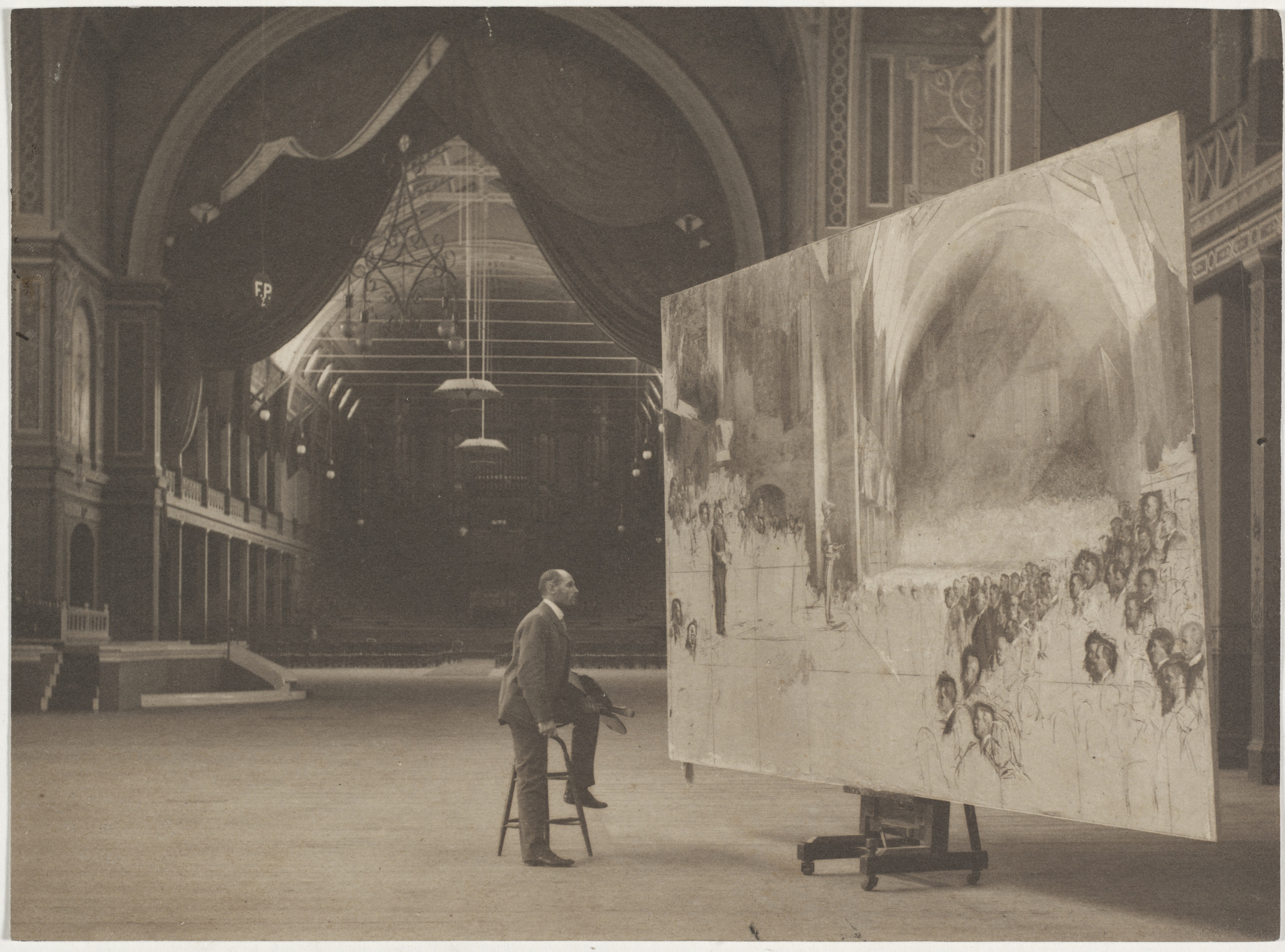
Roberts painting The Big Picture, 1903

Roberts painted a considerable number of fine oil landscapes and portraits, some painted at artist camps with his friend McCubbin. Perhaps the most famous in his time were two large paintings, Shearing the Rams, now displayed in the National Gallery of Victoria and The Big Picture, displayed in Parliament House, Canberra. The Big Picture, commissioned for a fee of one thousand guineas plus expenses was a depiction of the first sitting of the Parliament of Australia in the Melbourne Exhibition Building and was an enormous work, notable for the event depicted as well as the quality of Roberts' work.

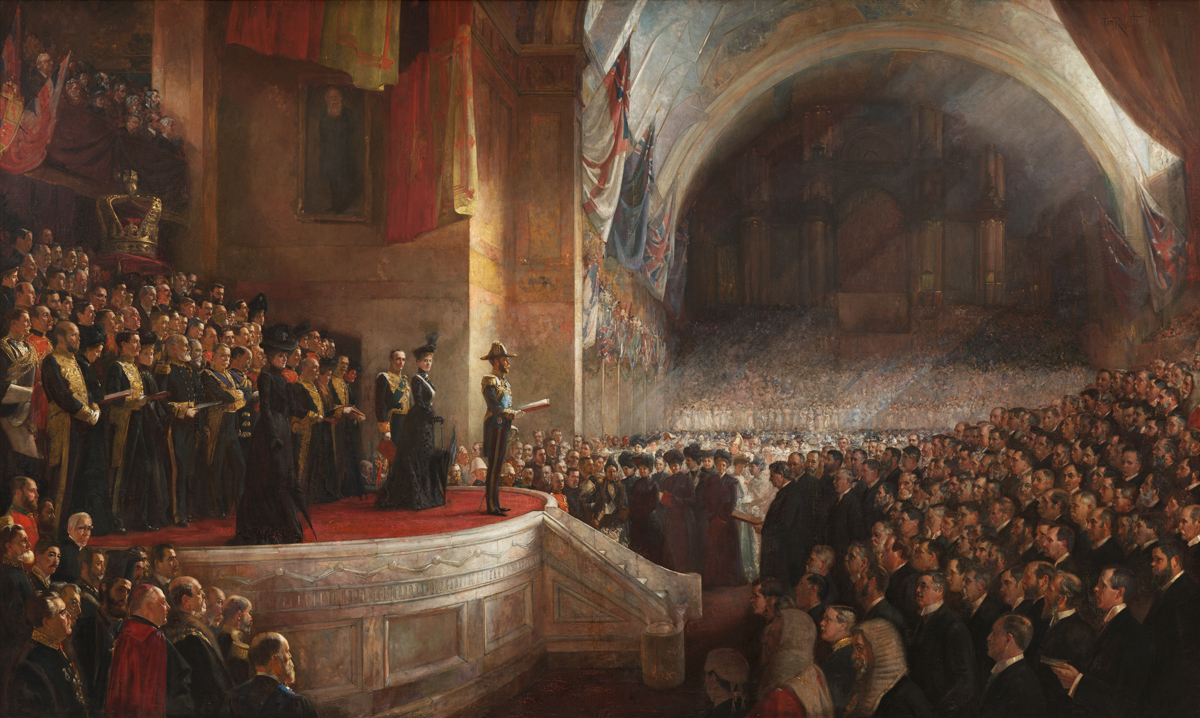
The Big Picture, 1903, Parliament House, Canberra

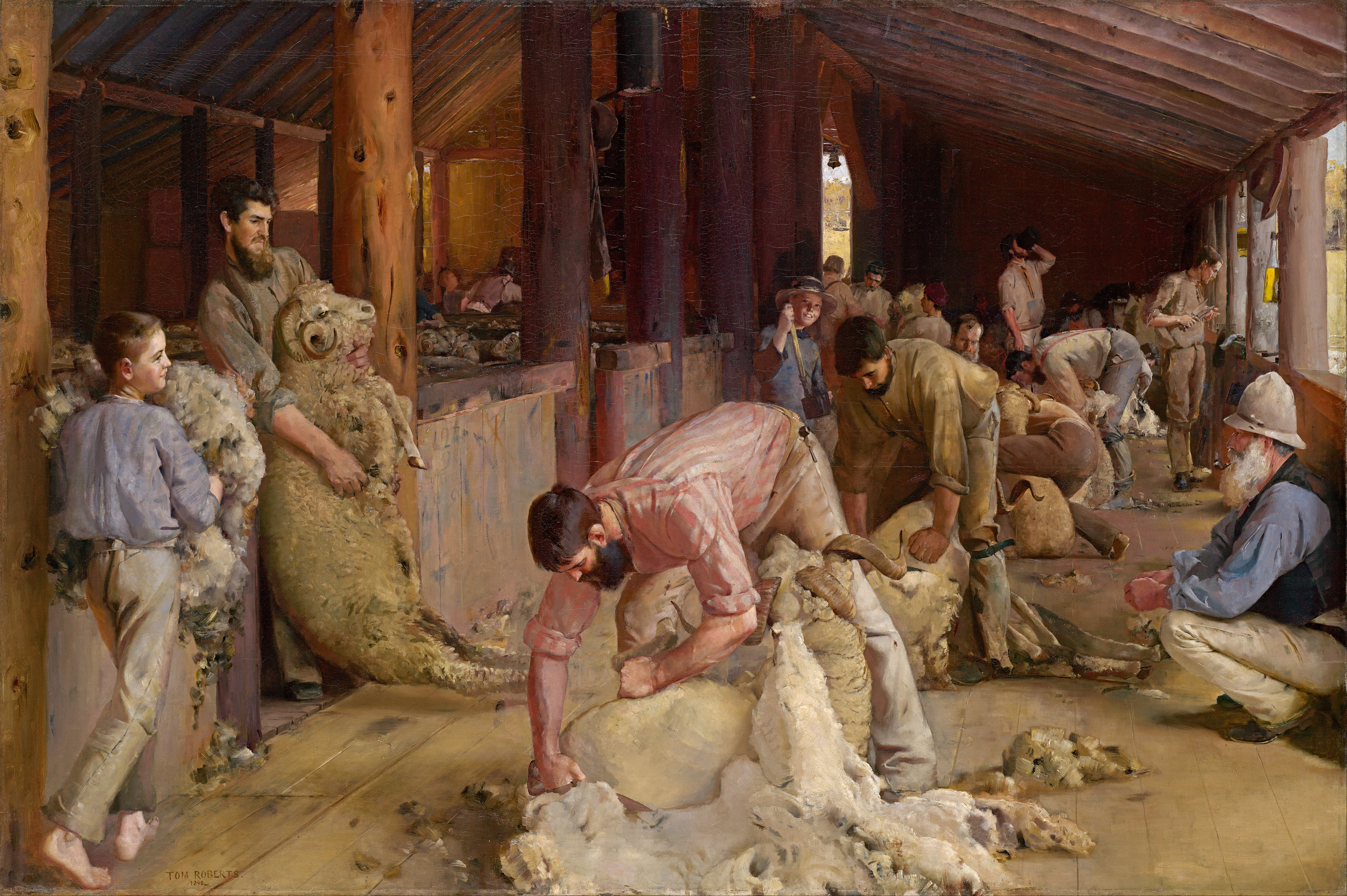
Shearing the Rams, 1890, National Gallery of Victoria

Shearing the Rams was based on a visit to a sheep station at Brocklesby in southern New South Wales, depicted the wool industry that had been Australia's first export industry and a staple of rural life. When it was first exhibited, there were immediately calls for the painting to enter a public gallery, with a Melbourne correspondent for the Sydney press stating, "if our national gallery trustees were in the least patriotic, they would purchase it." Some critics did not feel that it fitted the definition of 'high art'. However, since the wool industry was Australia's greatest export industry at the time, it was a theme with which many Australian people could identify. In this painting, as one modern reviewer has said, Roberts put his formal art training to work, translating "the classical statuary into the brawny workers of the shearing shed".

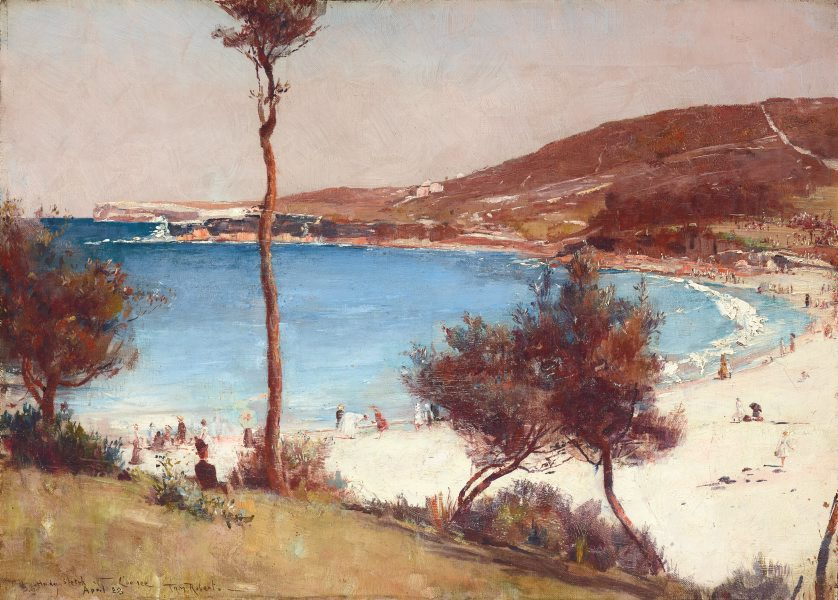
Holiday sketch at Coogee, 1888, Art Gallery of New South Wales

Roberts made many other paintings showing country people working, with a similar image of the shearing sheds in The Golden Fleece (1894), a drover racing after sheep breaking away from the flock in A break away!, and with men chopping trees in Wood splitters (1886). Many of Roberts' paintings were landscapes or ideas done on small canvases that he did very quickly, such as his show at the famous 9 by 5 Impression Exhibition in Melbourne, "9 by 5" referring to the size in inches of the cigar box lids on which most of the paintings were done. Roberts had more works on display in this exhibition than anyone else.

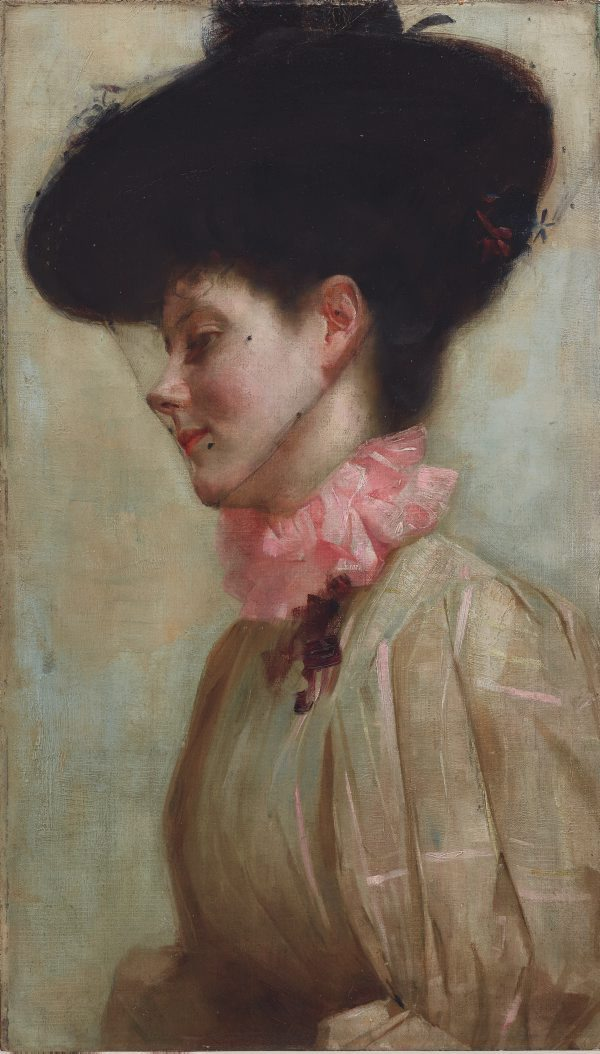
Roberts earned a living primarily through portraiture (Pictured: Portrait of Florence, 1898).

In 1888 Roberts met Conder in Sydney and they painted together at Coogee beach. The younger Conder found these painting expeditions influential and decided to follow Roberts to Melbourne later that year to join him and Streeton at their artists' camp at Heidelberg. While Conder painted Coogee Bay emphasising on the decorative qualities of form and colour, Roberts' Holiday sketch at Coogee(1888) embodies his primary focus on the landscape's natural effects. It is an early testament to Roberts' plein-air 'impressionist' technique, which brought out the sun's glare on the bright blue sea, bleached white sand, dry grass and spindly seaside vegetation.

== Legacy ==
Roberts' life was dramatised in the 1985 Australian mini series One Summer Again.

A "lost" painting titled Rejected was featured in a 2017 episode of the BBC series Fake or Fortune?. It was determined by experts to be a genuine Roberts, dating from his student years in London. Roberts' granddaughter considered it a self-portrait. If so, it would make it his oldest surviving self-portrait.

== Retrospectives ==
A retrospective toured Australia in 1996–97 and another was shown at the National Gallery of Australia from December 2015 – March 2016. Roberts was one of four Australian artists whose paintings featured in the Australia’s Impressionists exhibition at the National Gallery, London, which ran from December 2016 to March 2017; it was described as 'the first UK exhibition of its kind'.

== Gallery ==
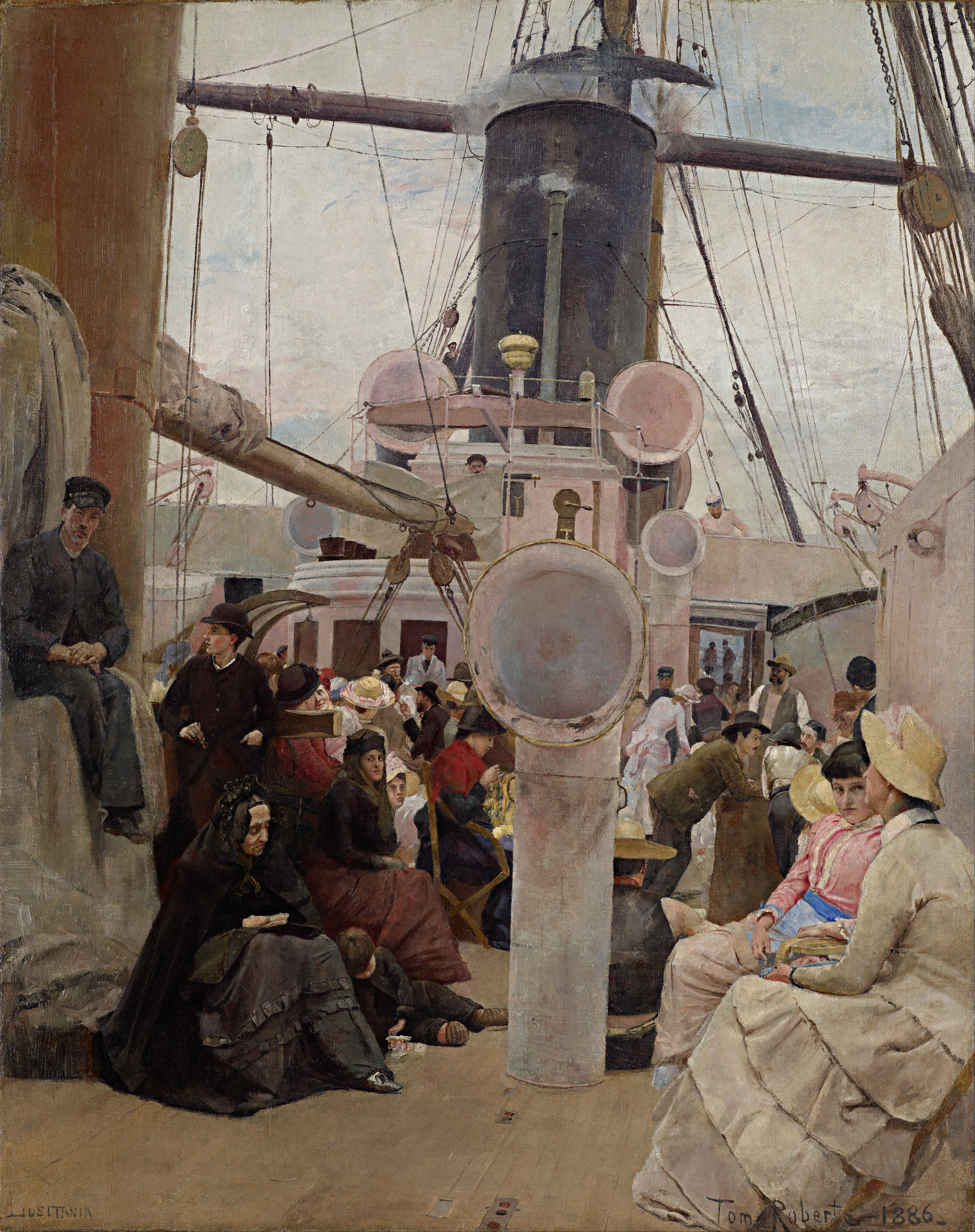
Coming South, 1886, National Gallery of Victoria

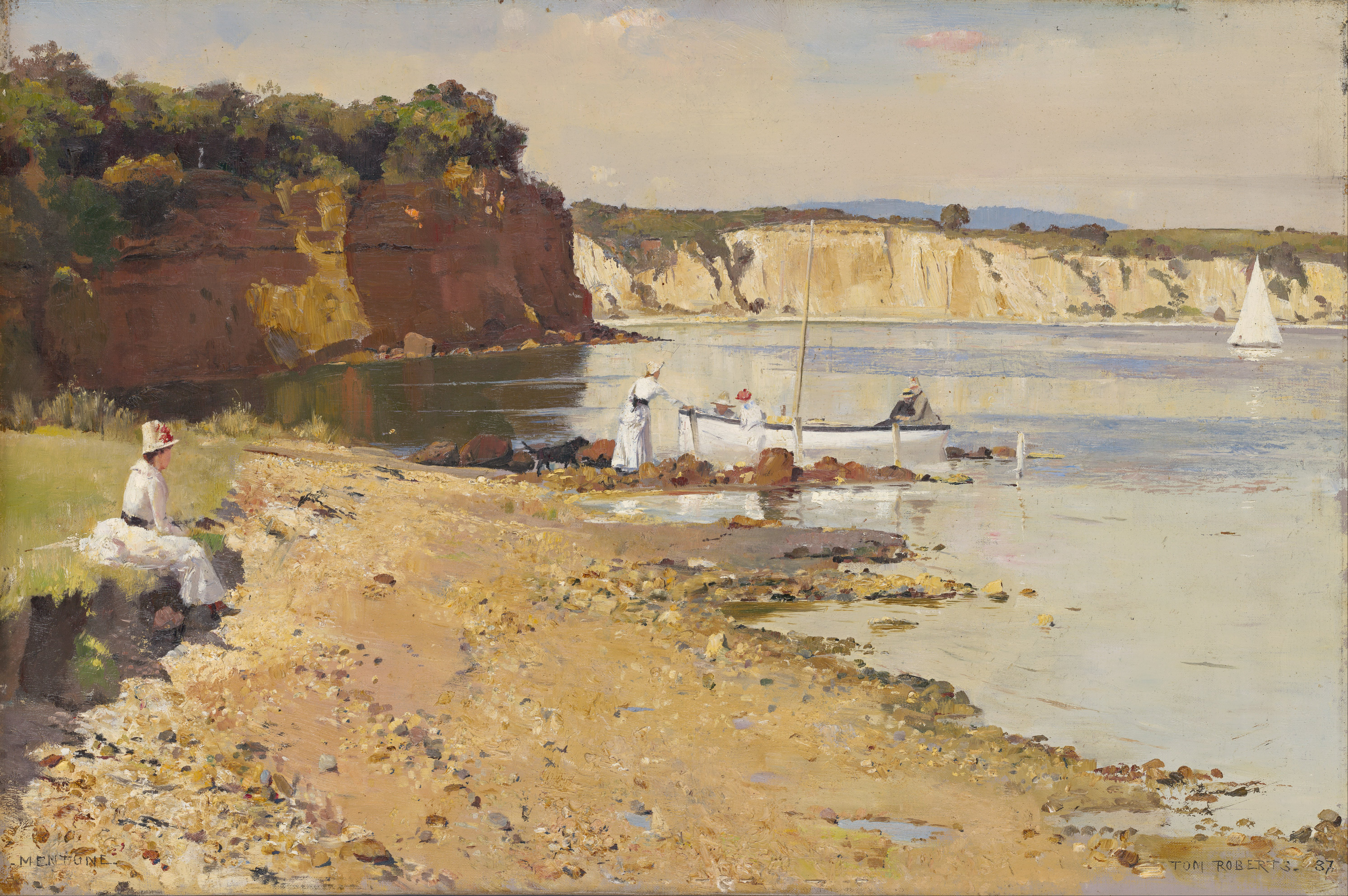
Slumbering Sea, Mentone, 1887, National Gallery of Victoria

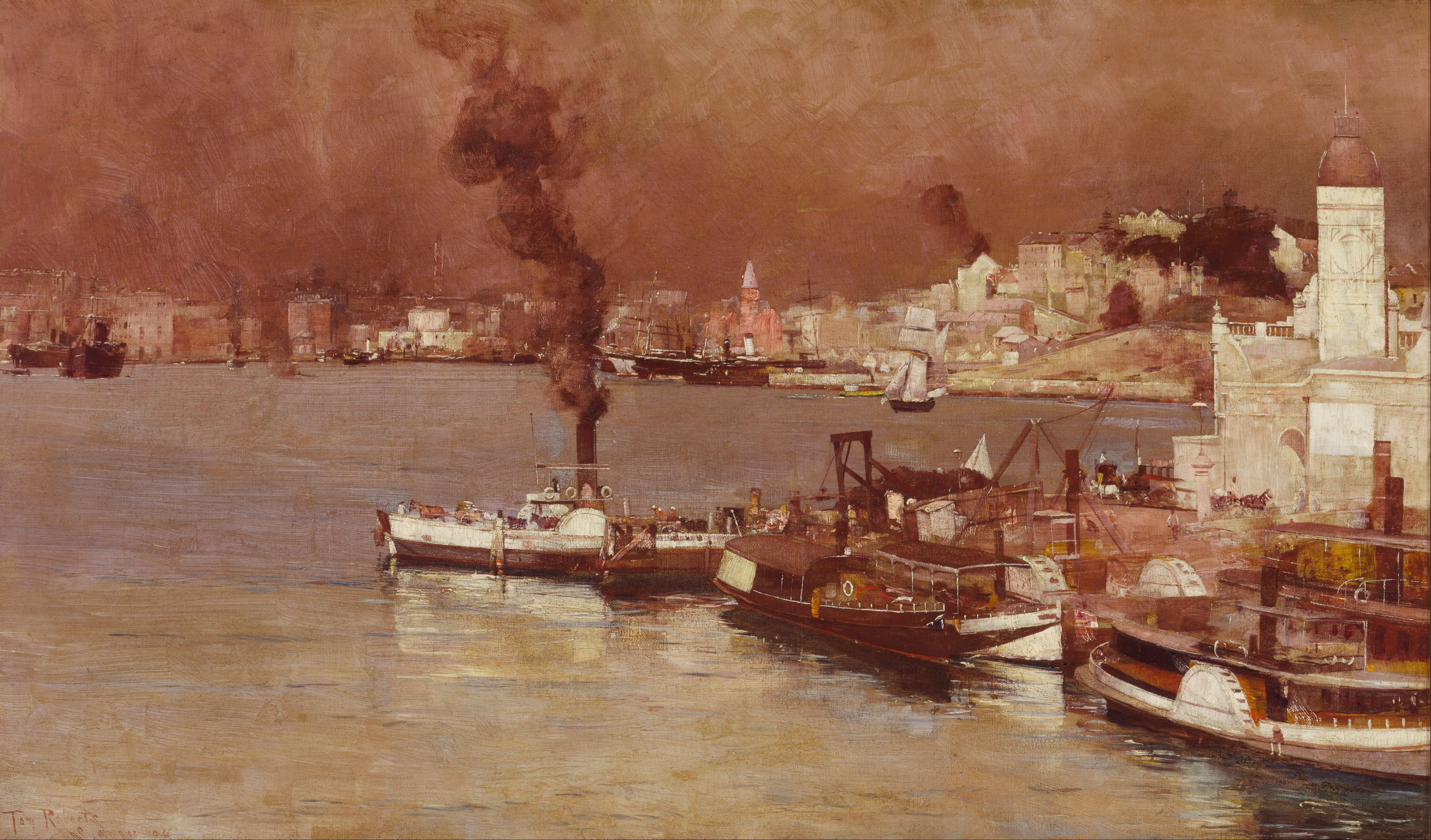
An autumn morning, Milson's Point, Sydney, 1888, Art Gallery of New South Wales

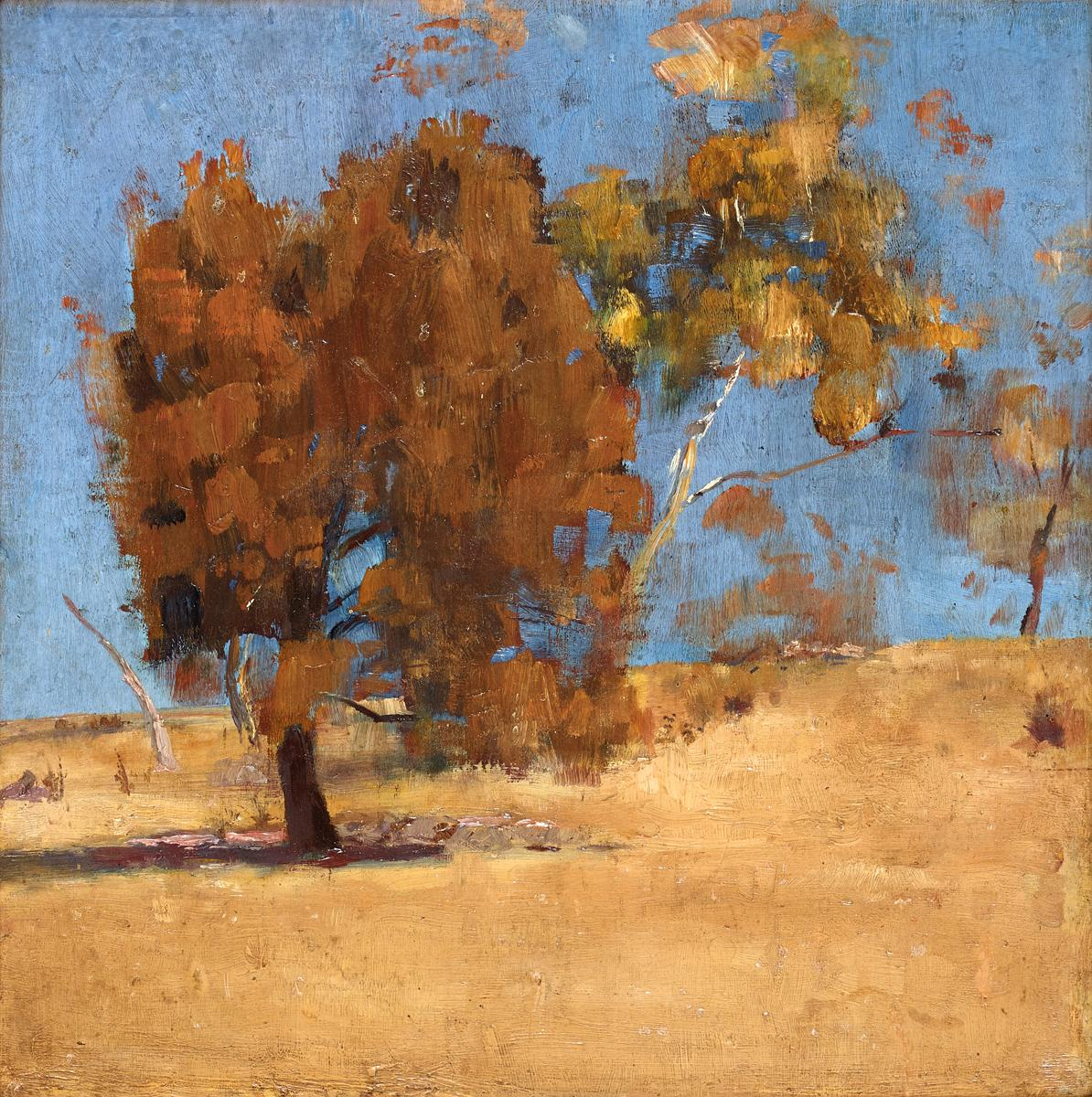
She-Oak and Sunlight, 1889, National Gallery of Victoria

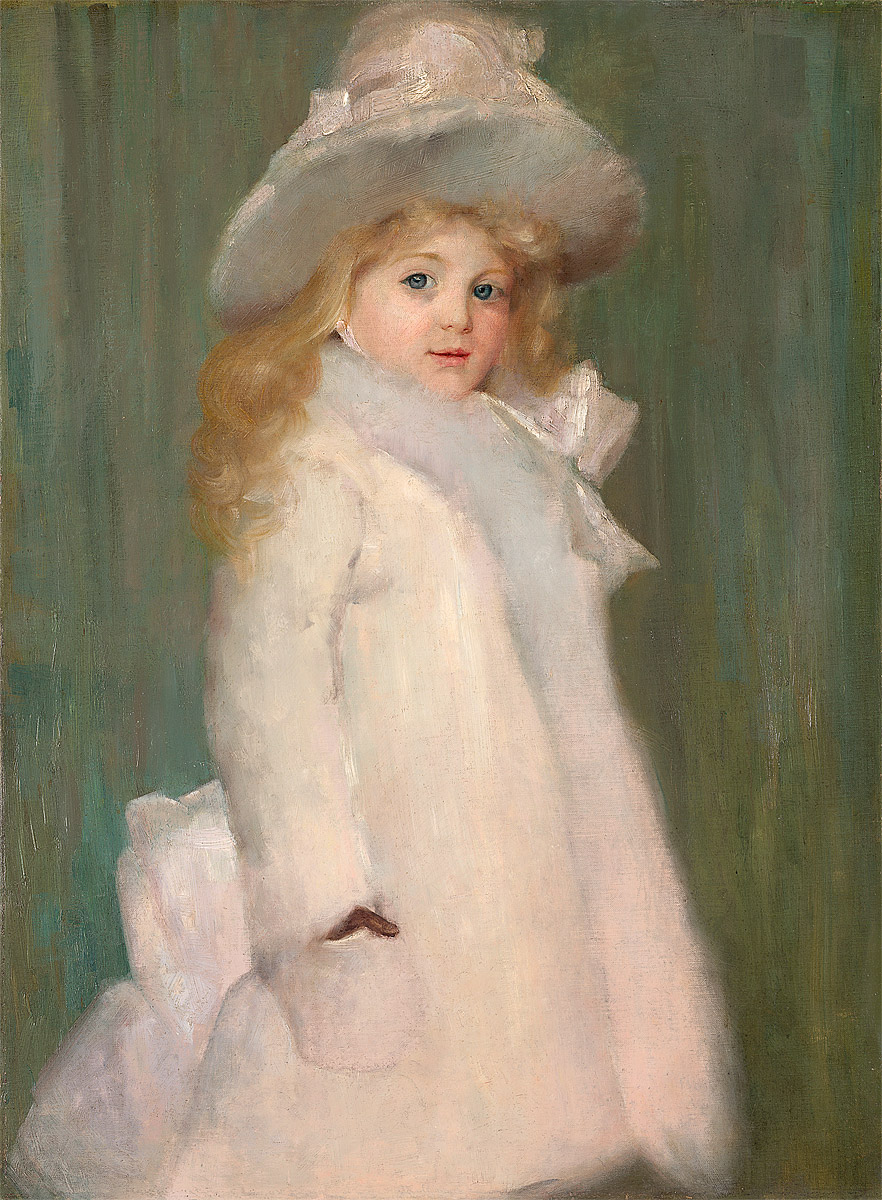
Lily Stirling, 1890, National Gallery of Victoria

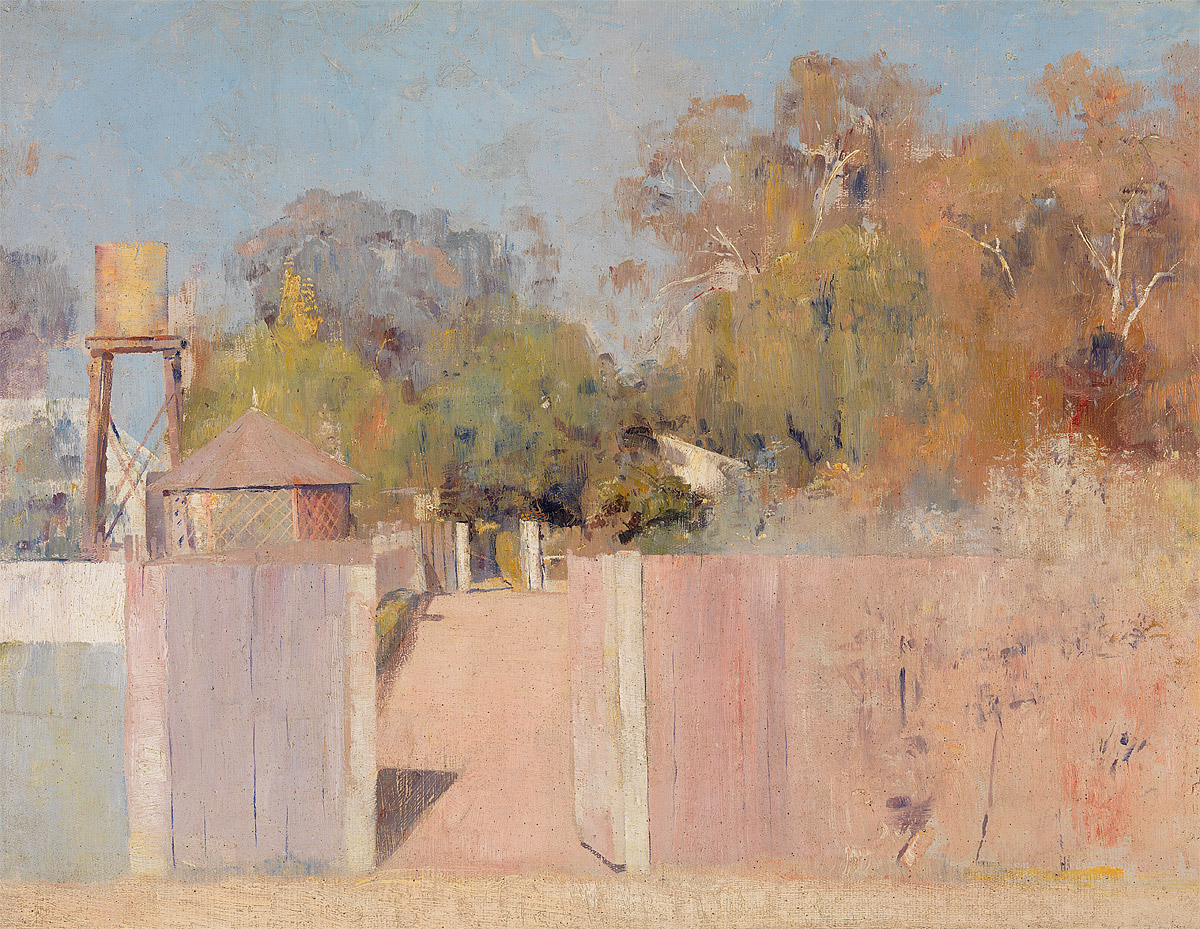
The old barracks at Collendina, 1891, National Gallery of Australia

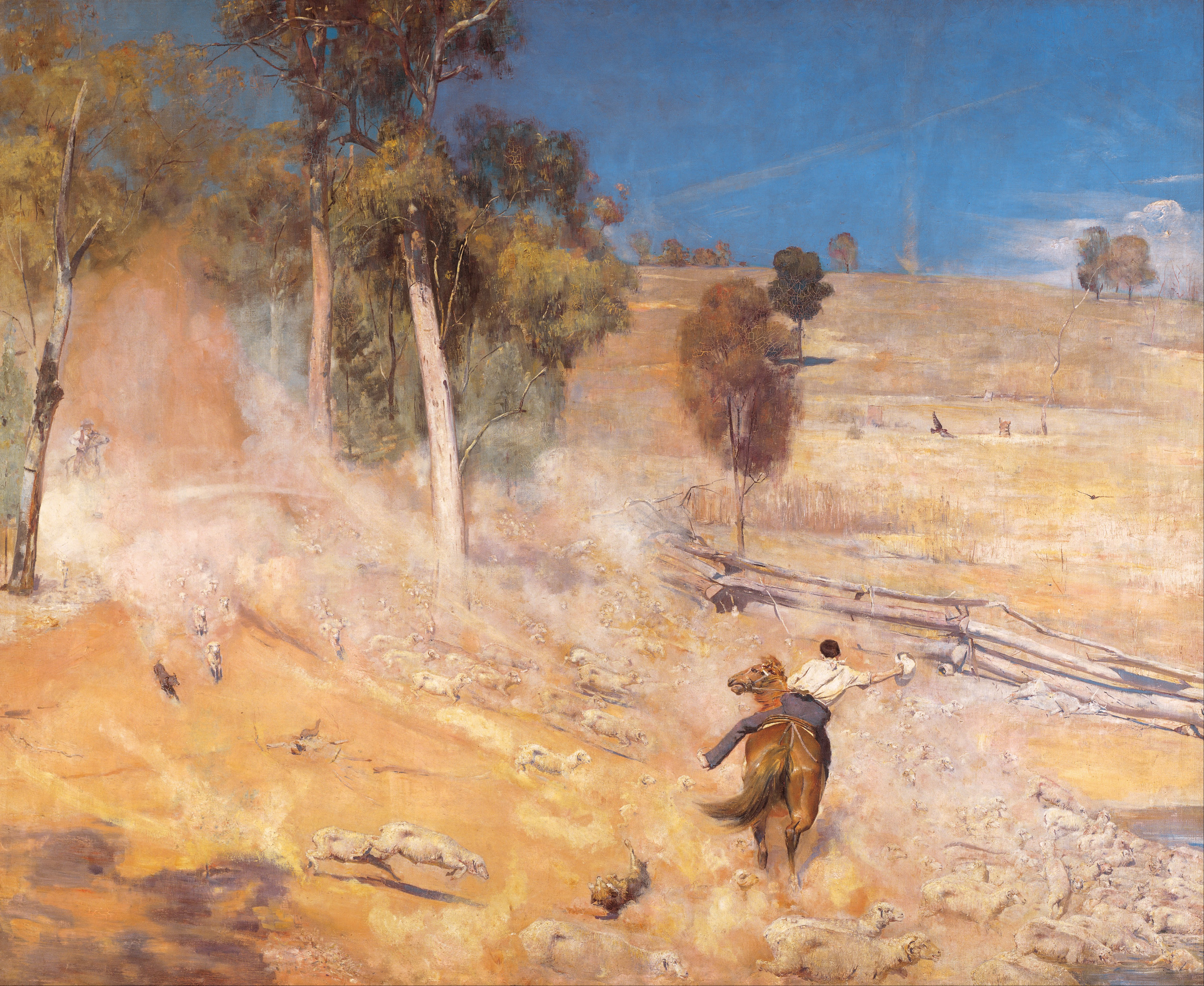
A break away!, 1891, Art Gallery of South Australia

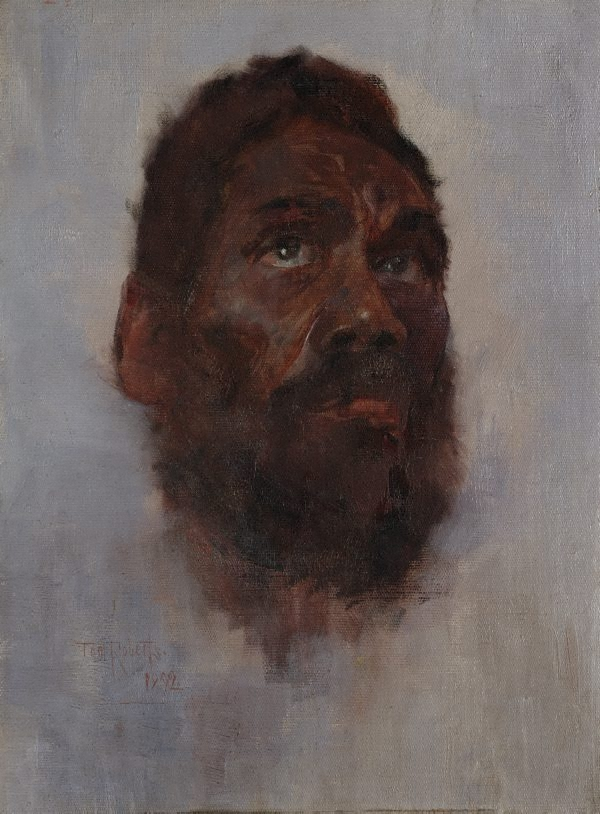
Aboriginal Head, Charlie Turner, 1892, Art Gallery of New South Wales

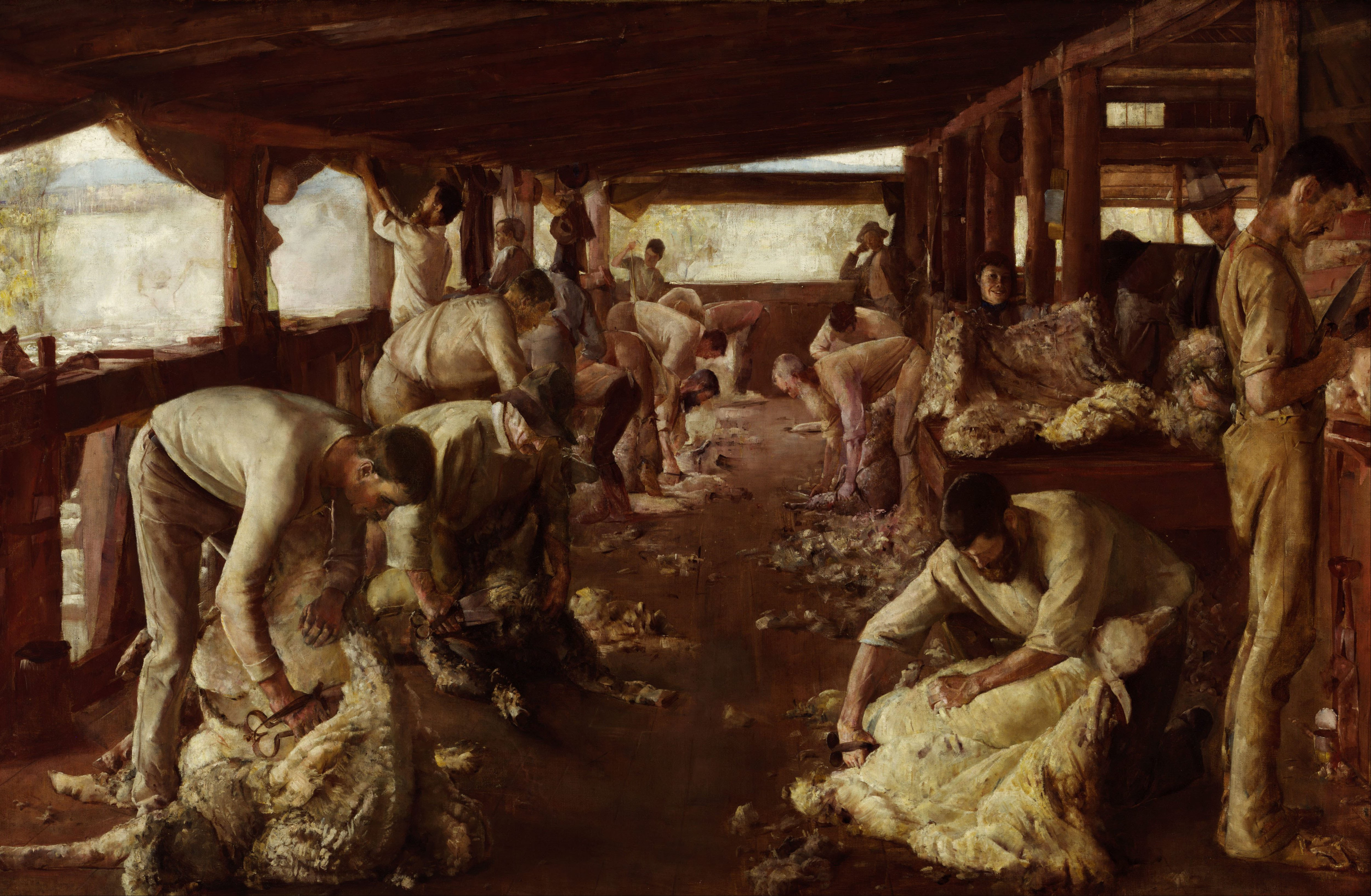
The Golden Fleece, 1894, Art Gallery of New South Wales

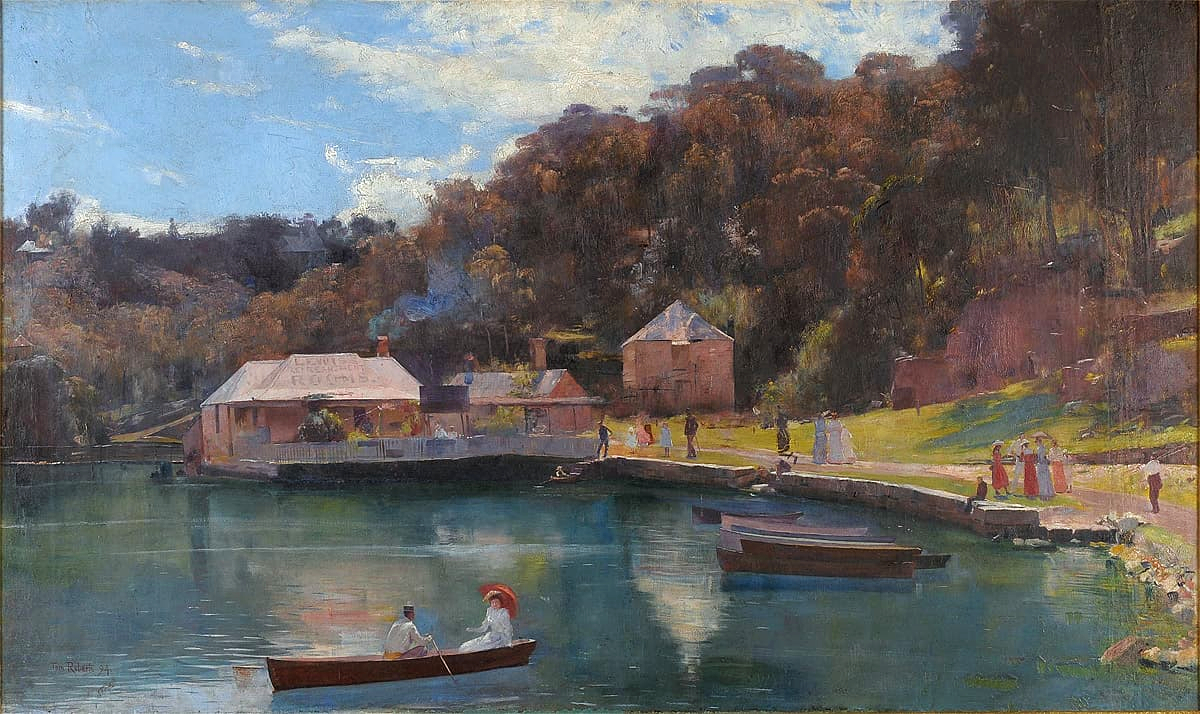
Mosman's Bay, 1894, New England Regional Art Museum

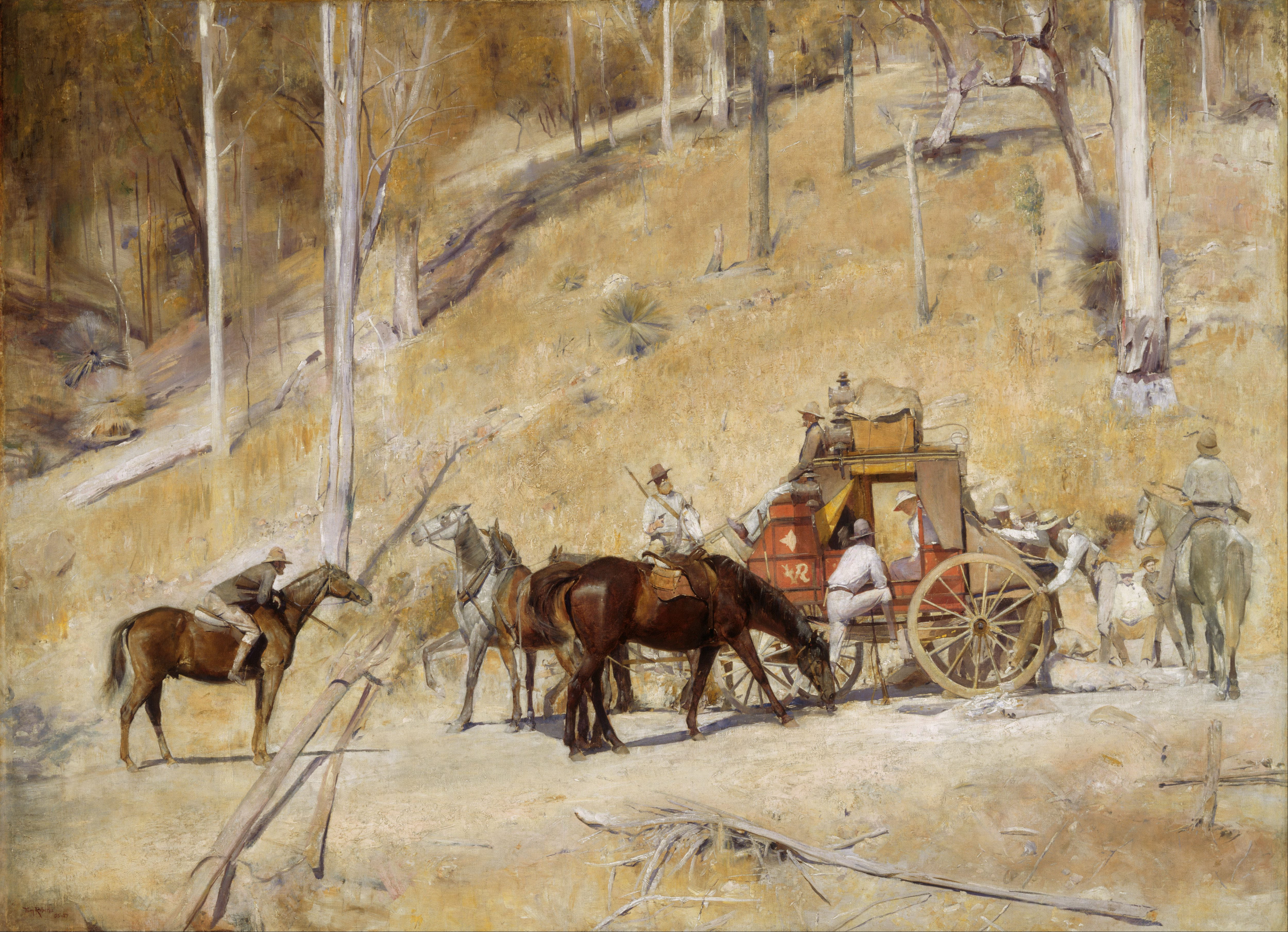
Bailed Up, 1895, Art Gallery of New South Wales

== See also ==
- Australian art
