= Longacres, Olinda =

Heritage-listed house in Melbourne, Victoria, Australia

Longacres
- Location of the house in Greater Metropolitan Melbourne

General information
- Status: Completed
- Type: House
- Architectural style: Arts and Crafts
- Location: 15 Range Road, Olinda, Yarra Ranges, Melbourne, Victoria, Australia
- Coordinates: 37°51′27″S 145°21′44″E
- Year built: 1923–1924
- Completed: 1924; 102 years ago
- Client: Sir Arthur Streeton

Technical details
- Material: Timber; roof shingles
- Grounds: 2 ha (5 acres)

Design and construction
- Architect: Harold Desbrowe-Annear (attrib.)

Victorian Heritage Register
- Official name: Longacres
- Type: Registered place
- Delisted: 26 October 2000
- Reference no.: H1876
- Heritage overlay no.: HO12
- Category: Residential buildings (private)

Register of the National Estate
- Official name: Longacres
- Type: Defunct register
- Designated: undated
- Reference no.: 1036431

Longacres is a house located at 15 Range Road in Olinda, in the Yarra Ranges, in the north eastern suburbs of Melbourne, in Victoria, Australia.

Built in 1924 on the traditional lands of the Wurundjeri people, the house was added to the Victorian Heritage Register on 26 October 2000 in recognition of its historical significance; and was also added to non-statutory lists by the Victorian branch of the National Trust on 6 October 1997 and the now defunct Register of the National Estate on an unknown date.

== History ==
Longacres was built for the famed Australian artist Sir Arthur Streeton between 1923 and 1924. Streeton was born at Duneed near Geelong in 1867. By age 19 the largely self-taught Streeton had met Tom Roberts and had joined his small painting group which included Frederick McCubbin and Louis Abrahams. Streeton painted at Box Hill and Heidelberg where the group of friends was also joined by Charles Conder. These artists formed the basis of Australian impressionist art were the founders of the Heidelberg School, the first such school of Australian painting. Streeton also painted in western New South Wales before moving to London in 1896.

In 1908 he married violinist Esther Leonora Clench in London; and, in 1915, Stretton enlisted in the Royal Army Medical Corps and was appointed an official war artist from 1918 where he documented Australian troops at the Western Front until the cessation of hostilities.

In 1920 Streeton returned to Australia and a year later bought two hectares (five acres) at Olinda. From this time he continued to paint and exhibit in Australia and consolidated his position by his appointment as an art critic to The Argus newspaper. Streeton also wrote in the press on art, the environment and public affairs. He also wrote on the history of Australia painting as well as organising exhibitions and a catalogue of his own works. Streeton was knighted in 1937. Following the death of Nora in 1938 Streeton moved permanently to Olinda where he devoted much time to his garden until his death at Longacres in 1943.

Streeton is recognised as one of the great landscape painters of Australian art and his work is represented in many Australian galleries. Streeton's work continues to be highly sought after by Australian galleries and private collectors.

== Description ==
Longacres constitutes a house and gallery, a painting studio, a caretakers residence and several outbuildings arranged in an informal garden on approximately 2 hectares (5 acres). Not all buildings were completed at the one time but they were built for Streeton.

The house, with an attached gallery constructed in 1939, is in an Arts and Crafts style bungalow. There is evidence to suggest that Harold Desbrowe-Annear, a close friend of Streeton's, was consulted in the design of the buildings on the property.

The buildings and the layout of the grounds are much as they were in Streeton's time with recent-repairs being undertaken by Arthur's grandson Roger Streeton.

Much of the garden was created by Streeton, who was also a knowledgeable gardener, and he planted many North American species including oaks, lindens, tulip trees, conifers, rhododendrons, fruit trees and alpine plants in the rockery below the studio. The plantings of Tilia x Europeaea, a rare Tilea Americana, (Linden) and Pseudotsuga Menziesii (Douglas Fir) plantation were for Nora's benefit. These along with a row of Liriodendron Tulipifera (Tulip Tree) at the entrance and an avenue of Quercus Coccinea (Scarlet Oak) along the driveway have reached maturity and are of landscape importance.

== See also ==
- Architecture of Melbourne
- List of gardens in Victoria
- List of places on the Victorian Heritage Register in the Shire of Yarra Ranges
