= Golden Summer, Eaglemont =

Painting by Arthur Streeton

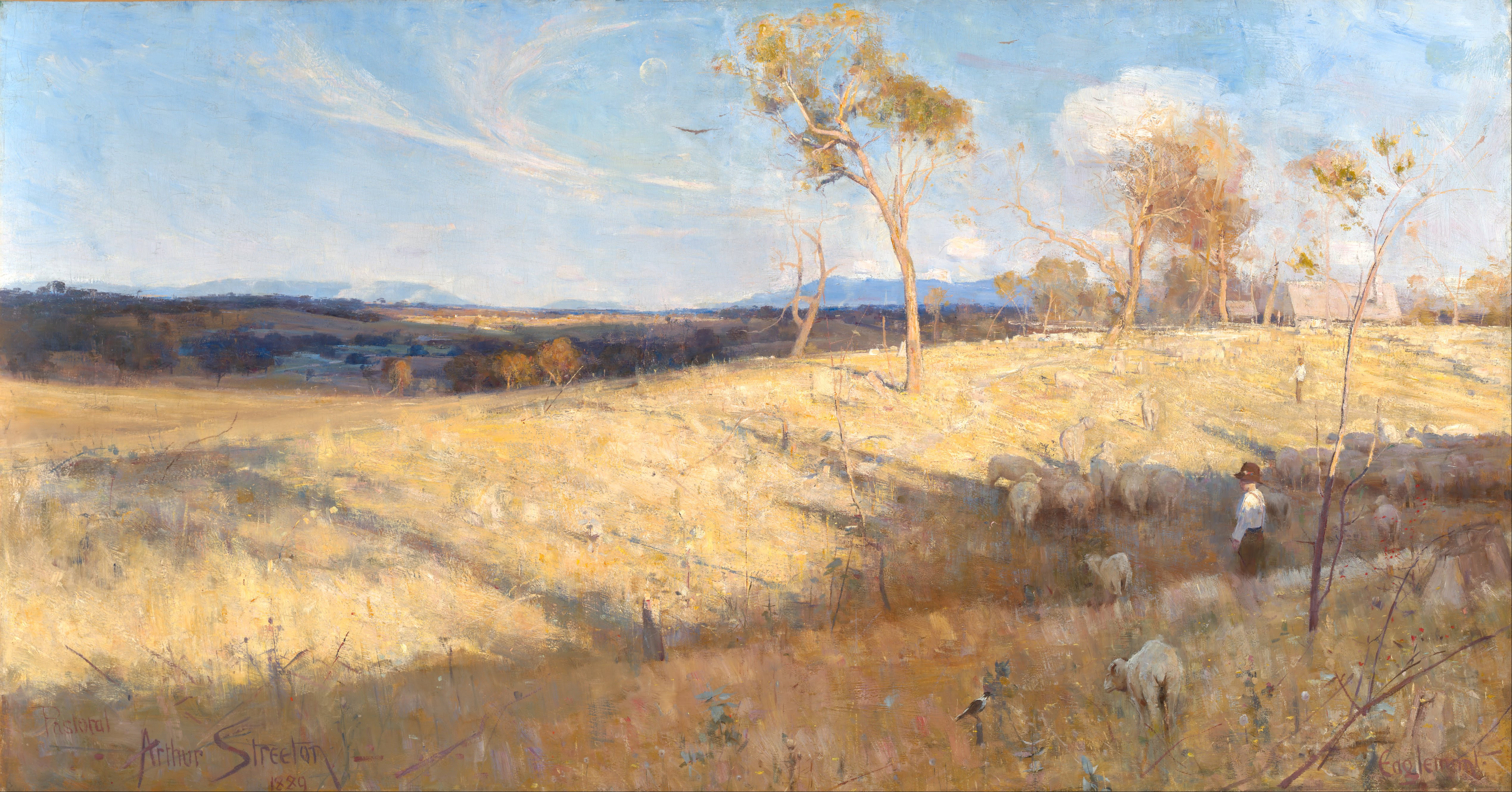
- Artist: Arthur Streeton
- Year: 1889
- Medium: Oil on canvas
- Dimensions: 81.3 cm × 152.6 cm (32.01 in × 60.08 in)
- Location: National Gallery of Australia, Canberra

Golden Summer, Eaglemont is an 1889 landscape painting by Australian artist Arthur Streeton. Painted en plein air at the height of a summer drought, it is an idyllic depiction of sunlit, undulating plains that stretch from Streeton's Eaglemont "artists' camp" to the distant blue Dandenong Ranges, outside Melbourne. Naturalistic yet poetic, and a conscious effort by the 21-year-old Streeton to create his grandest work yet, it is a prime example of the artist's distinctive, high-keyed blue and gold palette, what he considered "nature's scheme of colour in Australia".

The National Gallery of Australia acquired the painting in 1995 for $3.5 million, then a record price for an Australian painting. It remains one of Streeton's most famous works and is considered a masterpiece of Australian Impressionism.

== Background ==
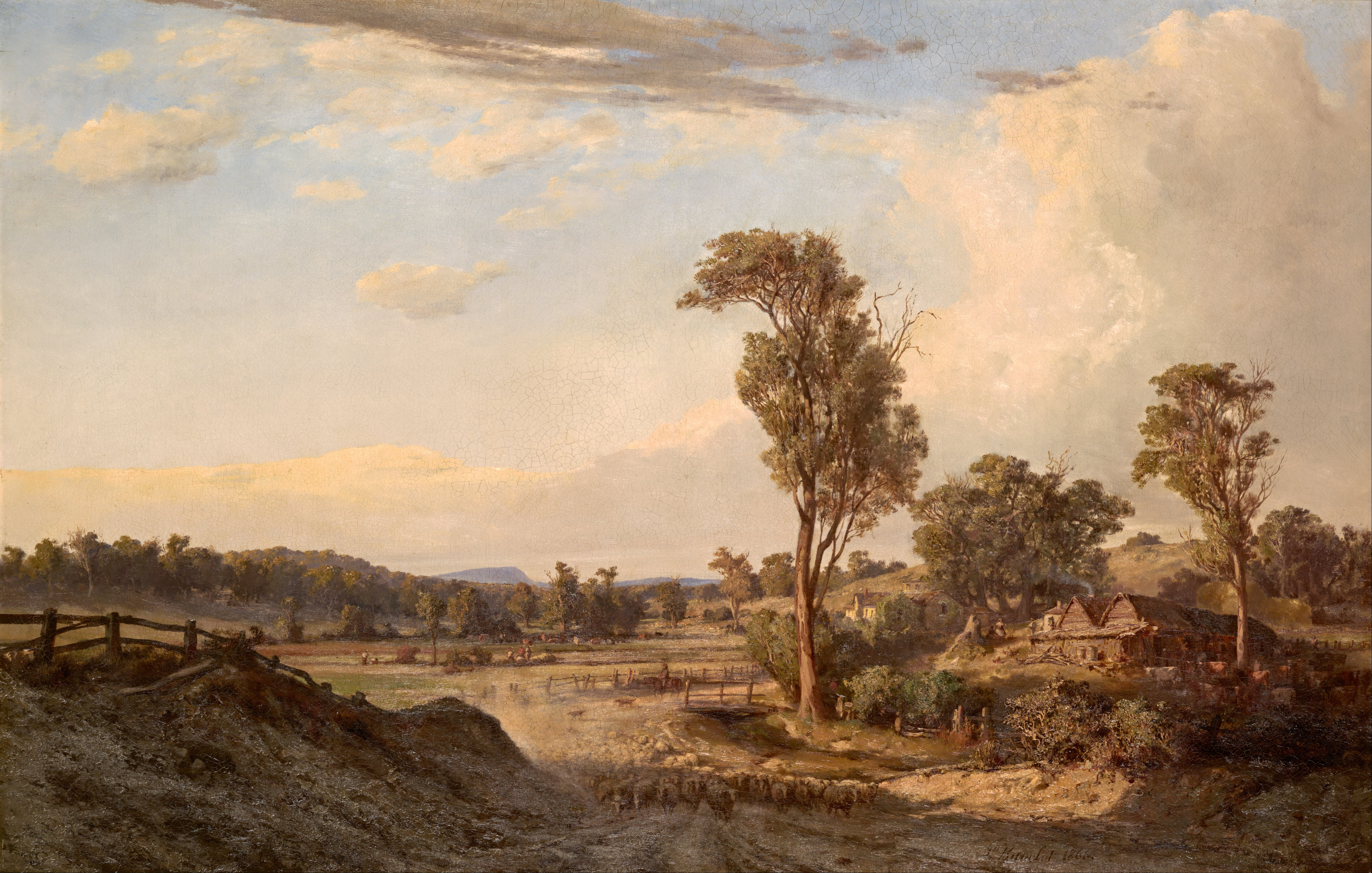
Louis Buvelot's 1866 painting Summer Afternoon, Templestowe (National Gallery of Victoria) inspired Streeton to visit Eaglemont

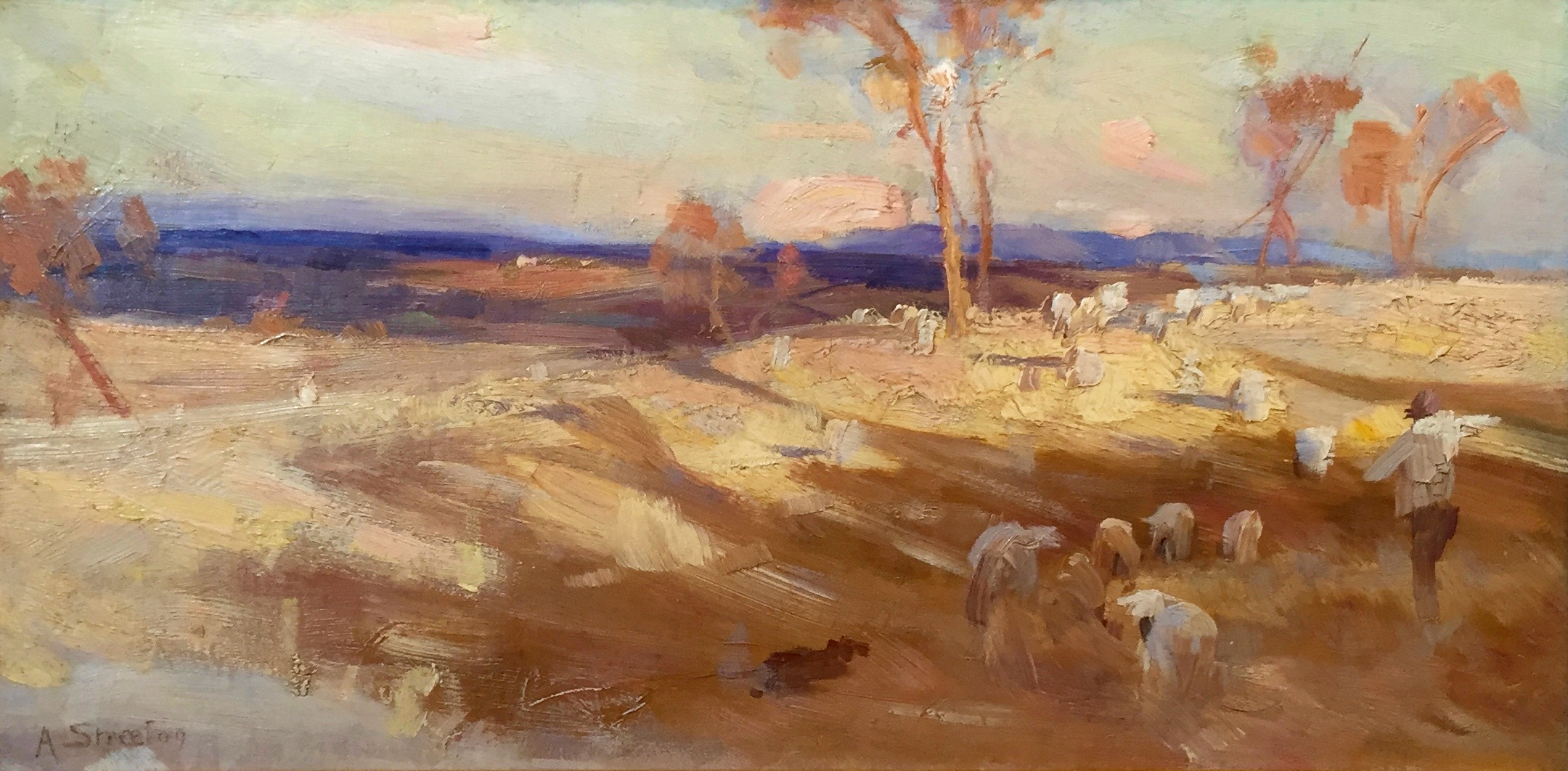
Streeton's Impression for Golden Summer (1888, Benalla Art Gallery) formed part of the 9 by 5 Impression Exhibition of 1889

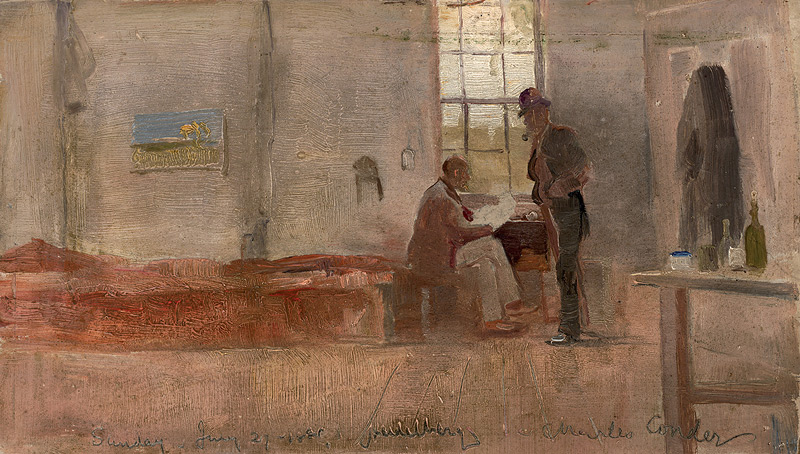
Conder's 9 by 5 work Impressionists' Camp (1889, National Gallery of Australia) shows Streeton and Roberts inside the Eaglemont homestead. Streeton's Impression for Golden Summer hangs on the wall.

Streeton painted the work en plein air in January 1889 at his Eaglemont "artists' camp", located in the then-rural suburb of Heidelberg on Melbourne's outskirts. He passed through the area in late 1888 in search of the site depicted in one of his favourite paintings, Louis Buvelot's Summer Afternoon, Templestowe (1866). On his return journey, he met Charles Davis—brother-in-law of painter and friend David Davies—who granted him "artistic possession" of an old weatherboard homestead atop Mount Eagle. Streeton occupied the homestead over the next eighteen months; fellow plein airists Charles Conder and Tom Roberts joined him for extended periods, and less frequently other artists, notably Walter Withers.

Streeton described the location in a letter to Roberts, calling it "our hill of gold":

I sit here in the upper circle surrounded by copper and gold, and smile with joy under my fly net as all the light, glory and quivering brightness passes slowly and freely before my eyes. Nothing happier than this. I shout and laugh at my immense wealth, all free and without responsibility. Who could steal this from me? No one.

The title may have been inspired by young plein airist Leon Pole, one of the earliest members of the camp. In a letter to Roberts, Conder wrote affectionately of Pole, but said that he "sometimes drinks a little too much 'Golden Summer', as he calls wine". Years later, Streeton recalled painting Golden Summer as he, Conder, and plein airist John Ford Paterson shared cheese and a bottle of claret. John Sandes, a journalist who often visited the Eaglemont camp, wrote in 1927:

[Streeton] would go off by himself with his easel and canvas and would lie on the grass for hours, wearing only shirt and trousers, and staring at the sky and at the river in the valley, and at the Dandenong Ranges. ... Then he would get up and paint with strong, sure strokes, and the thing would grow into beauty as you stole up and watched over his shoulder. That is how he painted Golden Summer while I looked over his shoulder—40 years ago.

The painting is noted for its thick application of paint, and one evening in the Eaglemont homestead, Streeton approached the canvas with a knife in order to scrape away some of the layers. Roberts convinced him to "leave it alone", for which Streeton was later thankful.

== Exhibition and reception ==
The so-called "impressionist school" at Heidelberg has done some good after all.

— The Colac Herald, 1891, after London's Royal Academy hung Golden Summer, Eaglemont on the line

Table Talk reported in May 1889 that Golden Summer, Eaglemont "abundantly testifies to [Streeton's] perfect sense of colour ... He paints summer effects as if he loved the country." When the painting appeared at the Victorian Artists Society's 1889 winter show, leading critic James Smith, while opposed to what he called "the impressionist fad", said Golden Summer "is the best example of this class of work in the exhibition."

In April 1890, Arthur and Emma Minnie Boyd of the Boyd artistic dynasty took Golden Summer, Eaglemont to London, where, the following year as Golden Summer, Australia, it hung on the line at the Royal Academy, and in so doing became the first painting by an Australian-born artist to be exhibited there. In 1892, it appeared at the Paris Salon, initially receiving an honorable mention, and then a gold medal during a second appearance. One critic noted the popularity of Golden Summer with "the crowds that throng the Salon", saying that it was "simply impossible" to pass by the painting "as it is utterly different from any other picture in the vast collection". Likewise, Australian artist John Longstaff, then based in Paris, said the painting "created quite a sensation and stood out in oneness and quality all through everything else on the walls."

In 1898, Golden Summer appeared at the Exhibition of Australian Art in London, where an English critic opined that it was "produced by a painter who sees with his own eyes", and that "its composition of light and shade ... [is] perhaps its strongest quality."

== Provenance ==
Soon after completing Golden Summer, Streeton offered it to Melbourne's National Gallery of Victoria for 100 guineas, but received no reply from the museum's trustees. Streeton sent them a second letter, writing sarcastically, "I should be obliged if you would convey to the Trustees my hearty thanks for the interest they have taken in the matter". Scottish shipbuilder Charles Mitchell purchased Golden Summer, Eaglemont on the opening day of the 1892 Paris Salon. It remained part of Mitchell's estate until Streeton re-acquired the painting from the shipbuilder's widow in 1919.

Ahead of its public auction in Australia in 1924, Lionel Lindsay extolled the work in the hope that it would enter a public gallery:

This tranquil landscape, so simply yet so exquisitely fashioned, possesses for Australians a sentiment no other people may equally enjoy. It is the first great Australian landscape, untrammeled by picture making formula, to come from the hand of the native born. It is, therefore, historically the most important landscape in Australia.

A private collector acquired it for 1,000 guineas, then a record for a painting by an Australian artist. Streeton used the money to commission an architect to design and build 'Longacres', a new house and studio in Olinda, outside Melbourne. Golden Summer broke the same sales record in 1995 when the National Gallery of Australia purchased it for $3.5 million. The record has been broken several times since, most recently in 2020 when Henri's Armchair (1974) by Brett Whiteley sold for over $6.1 million.
