= Grand Canal =

Grand Canal can refer to multiple waterways:

- Grand Canal (China) in eastern China
- Grand Canal (Ireland), between the River Shannon and Dublin in Ireland
- Grand Canal (Venice) in Venice, Italy
- Grand Canal d'Alsace in eastern France
- Grand Canal (Phoenix) in Arizona, United States
- Grand Canal (Mario), a fictional location appearing in Mario Party 7
- GRAND Canal or Great Recycling and Northern Development Canal, proposed for Great Lakes region of North America
- The proposed Pan Korea Grand Waterway (한반도 대운하) in South Korea, sometimes referred to as the "Grand Canal"
- The proposed Nicaragua Grand Canal that would link the Caribbean Sea and the Pacific Ocean
- The Great Man-Made River in Libya

== Other ==
- The Grand Canal (Streeton) – a 1908 painting by Arthur Streeton
