= Summer Afternoon, Templestowe =

1866 painting by Louis Buvelot

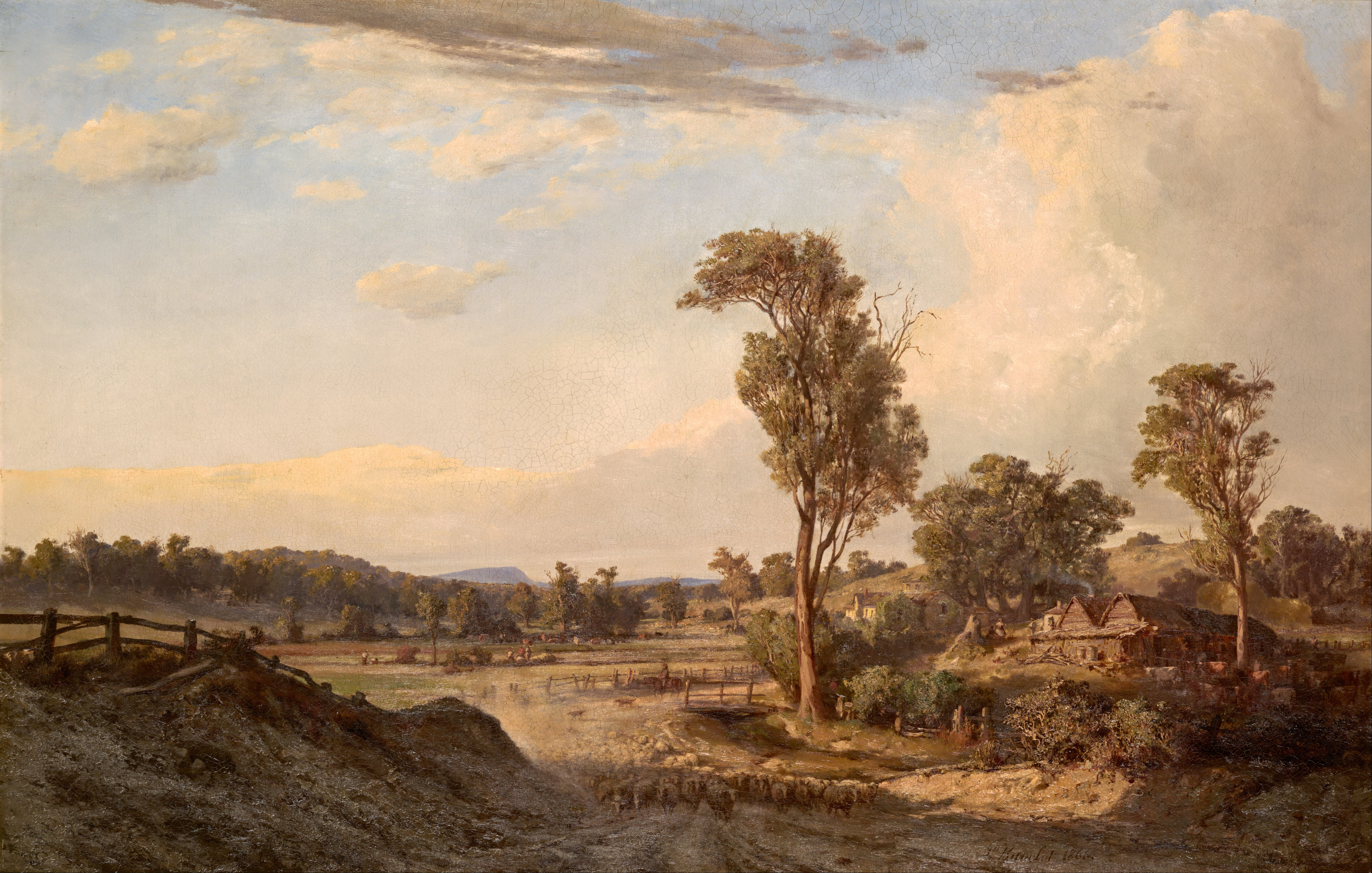
- Artist: Louis Buvelot
- Year: 1866
- Medium: Oil on canvas
- Dimensions: 76.6 cm × 118.9 cm (30.2 in × 46.8 in)
- Location: National Gallery of Victoria, Melbourne

Summer Afternoon, Templestowe is an 1866 painting by Swiss-Australian landscape painter Louis Buvelot. Held in the permanent collection of the National Gallery of Victoria in Melbourne, the work is regarded as a foundational piece of Australian landscape art, and a significant precursor to Australian Impressionism. The painting was one of the first purchases of the National Gallery of Victoria in 1869, where it has since remained, though it is not on display. It was a major inspiration for Arthur Streeton's 1889 painting Golden Summer, Eaglemont.
