= Blue Pacific (Streeton) =

Painting by Arthur Streeton

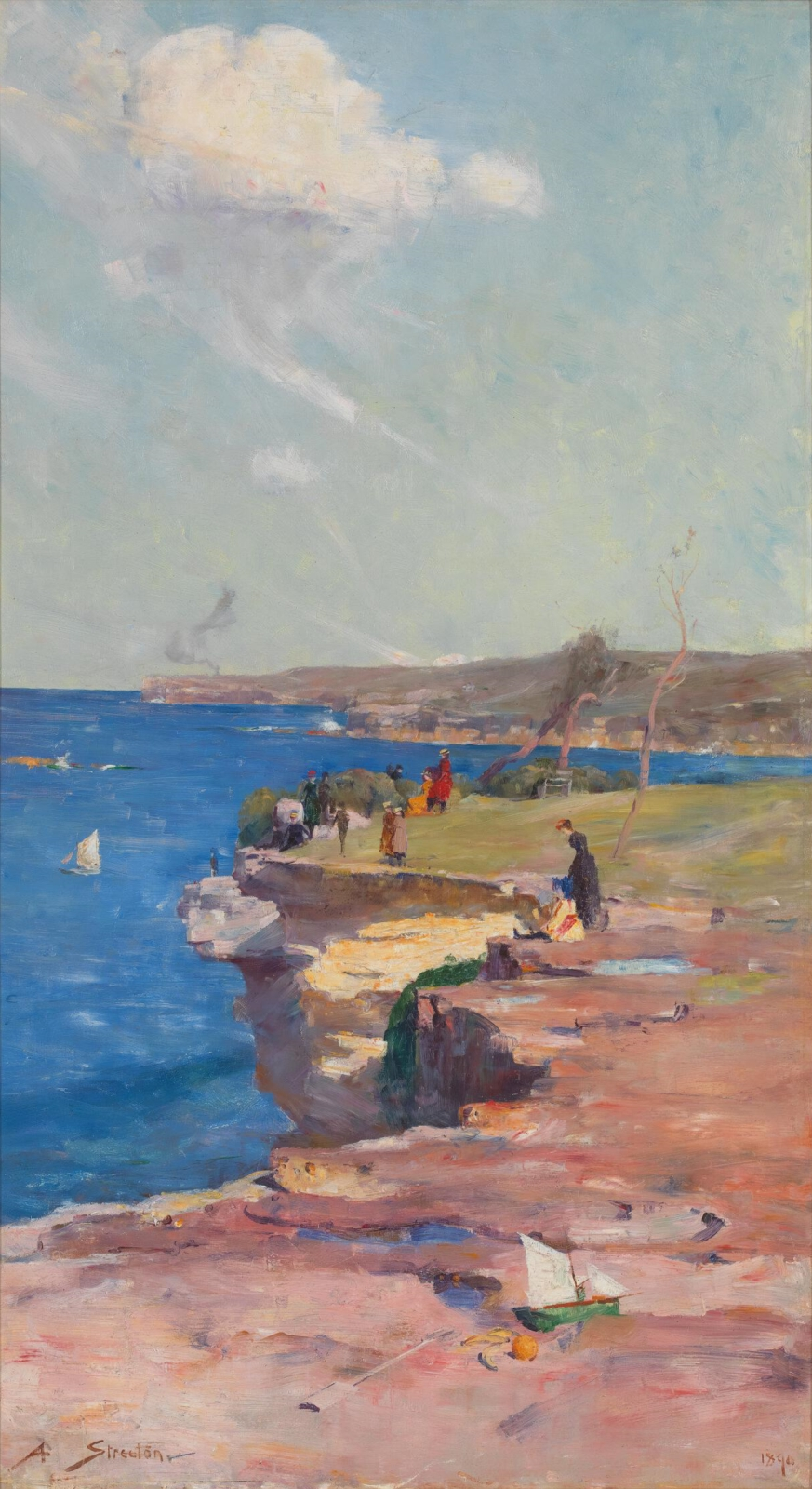
- Artist: Arthur Streeton
- Year: 1890
- Medium: Oil on canvas
- Dimensions: 91.4 cm × 50.8 cm (36.0 in × 20.0 in)
- Location: National Gallery; London

Blue Pacific is an 1890 oil on canvas landscape painting by Australian artist Arthur Streeton. The painting depicts a headland on the northern end of the eastern Sydney suburb of Coogee.

Blue Pacific was one of Streeton's first paintings after he moved to Sydney.

Coogee is a very jolly place ... On warm days the place (which is like a nest) is filled with smiles and sweet humanity. I'll come here to die I think.

— Arthur Streeton,

The painting was purchased by Central Coast businessman Jeff d'Albora for AUD1.08M in 2005. Since 2015, it has been on loan to the National Gallery in London. The painting is only the second painting from outside western Europe to be displayed in the National Gallery following a change in the Gallery's collection and display policy.

Gallery director Gabriele Finaldi said the painting demonstrates the influence of French impressionism on Australian art: "Here was a way of capturing the fleeting effects of light and atmosphere in nature when depicting landscapes that had never been depicted before."
