= Fire's on =

Painting by Arthur Streeton

- Artist: Arthur Streeton
- Year: 1891
- Medium: Oil on canvas
- Dimensions: 183.8 cm × 122.5 cm (72.4 in × 48.2 in)
- Location: Art Gallery of New South Wales; Sydney

Fire's on is an 1891 oil on canvas landscape painting by Australian artist Arthur Streeton. The painting depicts the construction of the Glenbrook Tunnel (also known as the Lapstone Tunnel) through the Blue Mountains. Unusually for a landscape, the painting is upright with a high horizon line. The painting's title refers to the warning call before the blast of the explosive.

The painting has been described as Streeton's "greatest work". Like his contemporary Tom Roberts' work Shearing the Rams (1890), Fire's on is an expression of Australian nationalism with its depiction of strong masculine labour building the nation's wealth. In Fire's on, however, the labourers themselves are dwarfed by the "heat-baked Australian landscape".

The painting was acquired by the Art Gallery of New South Wales in 1893 and remains part of its collection.
