= Nora Clench =

Canadian musician (1867–1938)

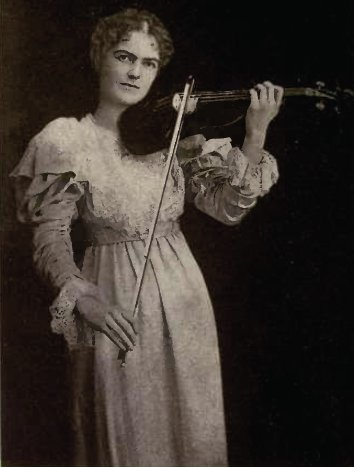

Background information
- Born: Esther Leonora Clench; May 6, 1867; St. Marys, Canada West, United Province of Canada
- Died: May 17, 1938 (aged 71) Toorak, Victoria, Australia
- Instrument: Violin
- Years active: 1889–1908

Esther Leonora Clench, Lady Streeton (May 6, 1867 – May 17, 1938) was a Canadian violinist.

== Early life and education ==
Born in St. Marys, Canada West, the daughter of L. M. Clench, Clench attended Loretto Convent in Hamilton, Ontario. Her father made a violin for her at the age of five, and she quickly became known as a musical child prodigy. She began touring and performing in Canada and the United States at eight years old. When she was fifteen she entered the Leipzig Conservatory in Germany, where she was a pupil of Adolph Brodsky, the Russian violinist. Upon graduation, she was awarded with a prize for her musicianship and skill. The prize was not annually awarded, but rather reserved for musicians who were especially deserving.

== Musical career ==
After graduating in 1889, she made her professional debut at the Academy of Music in Toronto, Canada. This was a momentous performance, as it was also the inaugural performance of the institution's new theater. She headlined the performance, which also included Fannie Bloomfield-Zeisler, an American pianist, and two other Canadians, Contralto Moran Wyman, and tenor Whitney Mockridge. Not long after, she became first violinist and leader of an orchestra in Buffalo, New York.

She also toured in Europe and moved to London. In 1893 she was invited to perform for the Queen Victoria in Osborne. She was awarded with a diamond and a ruby brooch by the queen for her performance.

She chose to continue training in 1895, this time with Joachim in Berlin, with whom, by her own account, she benefited greatly and grew as a musician thanks to his skilled teaching. she continued to tour and perform until 1900 (the year after she met Australian painter Arthur Streeton, who was almost completely unknown at the time they met) and began focusing on Painting instead. This hiatus was brief, as she began performing again in 1903, and formed the Nora Clench Quartet in 1904 with Lucy Stone as second violin, Cecilia Gates on viola, and May Mukle on Cello. Their first concert in June 1904 included works by Wolfgang Amadeus Mozart and Alexander Borodin.

The Nora Clench Quartet only lasted a few years, but in that time it received high praise for its performances. The Violin Times offered high praise for the quartet in its premiere performances that took place in January of that year at London's Aeolian Hall, stating that their interpretation and expression of Hugo Wolf's quartet in D minor was admirable. The same Times article illustrated how Clench continued performing as a soloist as well, playing a violin sonata together with Percy Grainger on the piano. Though the quartet was appreciated, its final performances came in 1907, as documented by the Violin Times. These performances included quartets from Mozart, Schumann, and the premiere of Max Reger's Quartet in D minor. These final performances were also praised, with the Times describing a large and appreciative audience in attendance.

Nora Clench retired in 1908 when she married Arthur Streeton. Three years later, their son Oliver (Charles Ludwig Oliver) Streeton was born. At the time of the marriage, Clench was held in high renown, while her new husband was still relatively unknown as an artist. Over the course of the ensuing years, this began to change. By the time they moved to Australia in 1924, she was almost completely unknown, while Streeton gained greater renown. His growing fame ultimately led to knighthood in 1937, giving her the title of Lady Streeton. By the time she died in Toorak, Victoria, Australia in 1938, she was known only for her relationship to Streeton among their contemporaries.
