= Arthur Streeton =

Australian painter (1867–1943)

Arthur Ernest Streeton
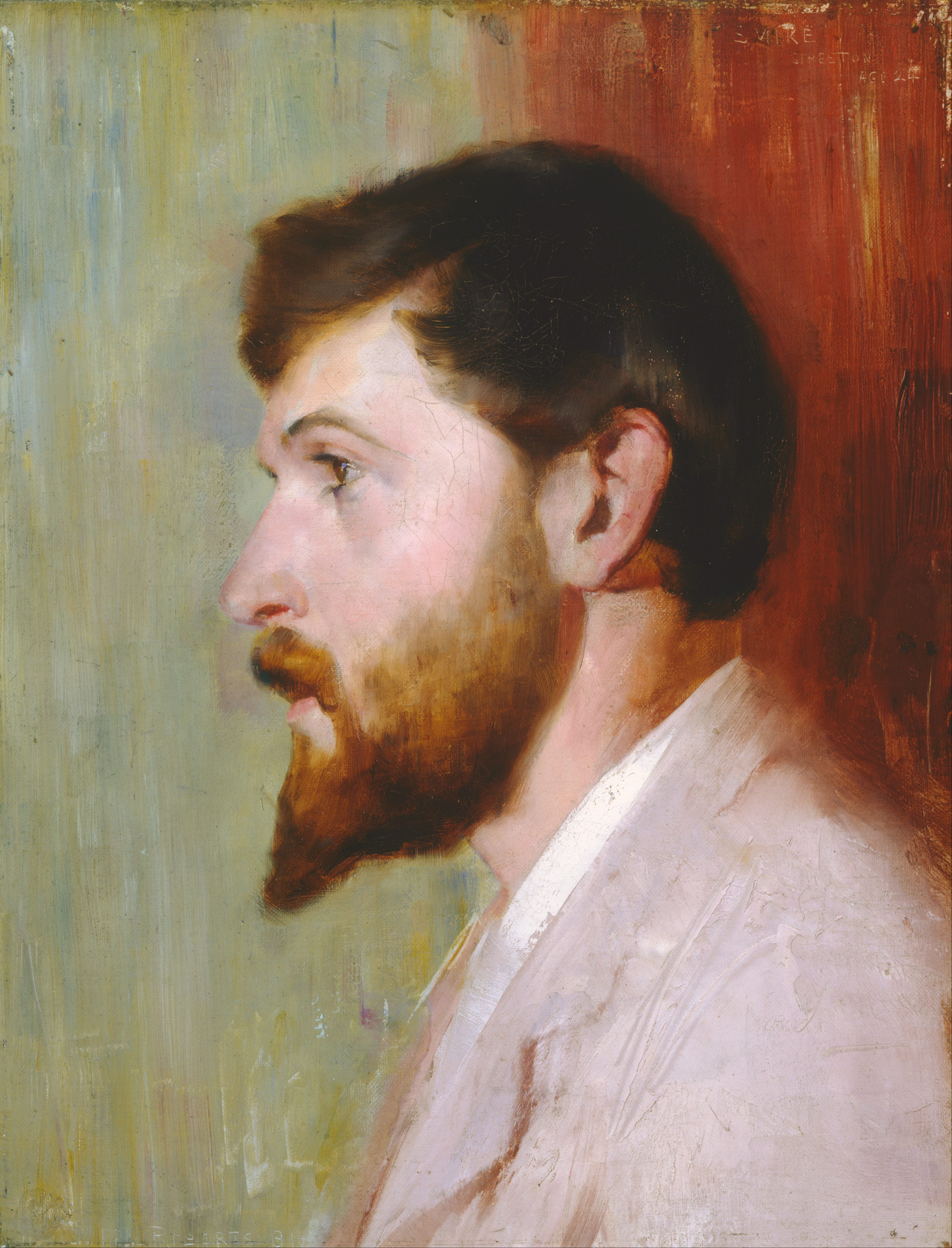
- Portrait of Streeton by Tom Roberts, 1891
- Born: Arthur Ernest Streeton; 8 April 1867; Mount Duneed, Victoria, Australia
- Died: 1 September 1943 (aged 76); Olinda, Victoria, Australia
- Education: National Gallery School
- Known for: Landscape painting
- Notable work: Golden Summer, Eaglemont (1889); Still glides the stream, and shall for ever glide (1890); Blue Pacific (1890); Fire's on (1891); The purple noon's transparent might (1896); The Grand Canal (1908); Afternoon Light, Goulburn Valley (1928)
- Style: Impressionism
- Movement: Heidelberg School
- Spouse: Nora Clench (m. 1908–1938)
- Children: 1
- Awards: Mention honourable, Paris Salon (1892); Wynne Prize (1928)
- Military career
- Allegiance: United Kingdom; Australia
- Branch: Royal Army Medical Corps; Australian Imperial Force
- Service years: c. 1912 – c. 1915; May–October 1918
- Rank: Corporal; Hon. Lieutenant / Official war artist
- Units: 3rd London General Hospital, Wandsworth; 2nd Division
- Conflicts: World War I

Sir Arthur Ernest Streeton (8 April 1867 – 1 September 1943) was an Australian landscape painter and a leading member of the Heidelberg School, also known as Australian Impressionism.

== Early life ==
Streeton was born in Mount Moriac, Victoria, south-west of Geelong, on 8 April 1867, the fourth child of Charles Henry and Mary (née Johnson) Streeton. His family moved to the Melbourne suburb of Richmond in 1874. His parents were English migrants who had met on their voyage to Australia in 1854. In 1882, Streeton commenced art studies with George Folingsby at the National Gallery School.

In 1885, Streeton exhibited works for the first time with the Victorian Academy of Art. He found employment as an apprentice lithographer under Charles Troedel.

== Career ==
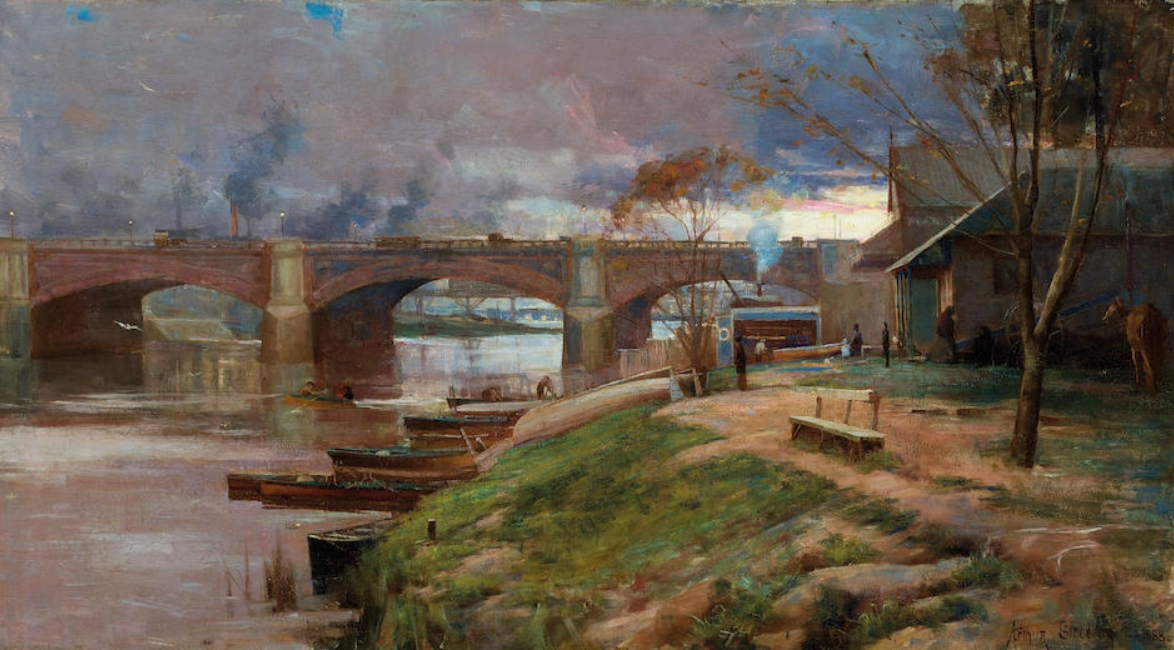
Princes Bridge, 1888, private collection

During the summer of 1886–87, Streeton, aged nineteen, first befriended Tom Roberts and Frederick McCubbin while painting en plein air at Mentone Beach. The pair greatly admired Streeton's work and invited him to join them at artists' camps they had established in both Mentone and Box Hill. They were later joined by Charles Conder, beginning a two-year period of close creative companionship, and forming the core group of what became known as the Heidelberg School movement, later also called Australian impressionism. Streeton's work rapidly improved during this period, and by 1888 he was widely considered one of Victoria's most gifted young painters.

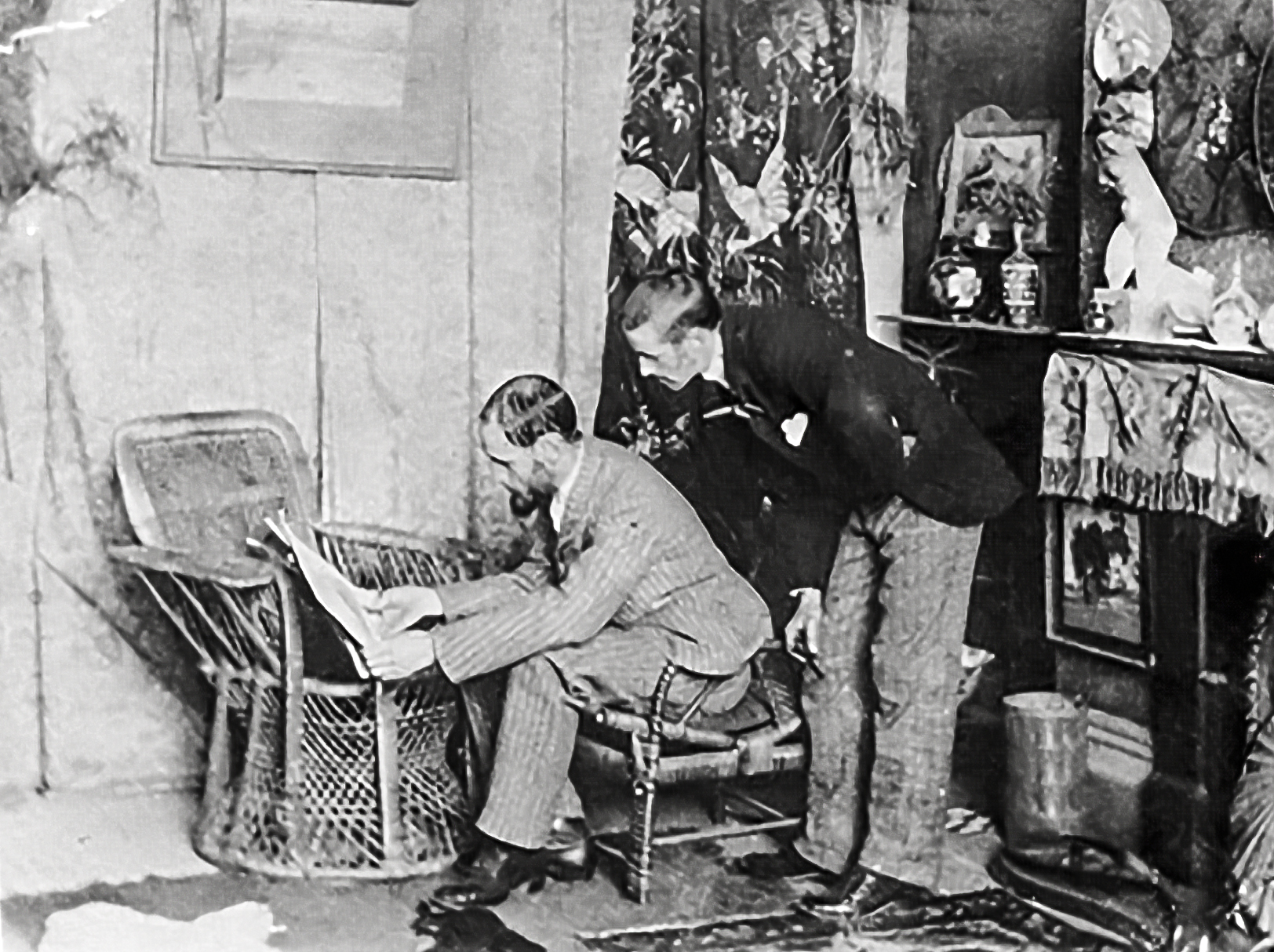
Streeton (standing) with Roberts in Grosvenor Chambers

Streeton was exhibiting and perhaps painting in the studio of his friend Roberts at Grosvenor Chambers, Collins Street by May 1888.

=== Eaglemont camp, Heidelberg ===
In the summer drought of 1888, Streeton travelled by train to the attractive agricultural and grazing suburb of Heidelberg, 11 km north-east of Melbourne's city centre. He intended to walk the remaining distance to the site where Louis Buvelot painted his 1866 work Summer afternoon near Templestowe, which Streeton considered "the first fine landscape painted in Victoria". On the return journey to Heidelberg, wet canvas in hand, Streeton met Charles Davies, brother-in-law of friend and fellow plein air painter David Davies. Charles gave him "artistic possession" of an abandoned homestead atop the summit of Mount Eagle estate, offering spectacular views across the Yarra Valley to the Dandenongs. For Streeton, Eaglemont (as it became known) was the ideal working environment—a reasonably isolated rural location accessible by public transport. The house itself could be seen by visitors as they arrived at Heidelberg railway station.

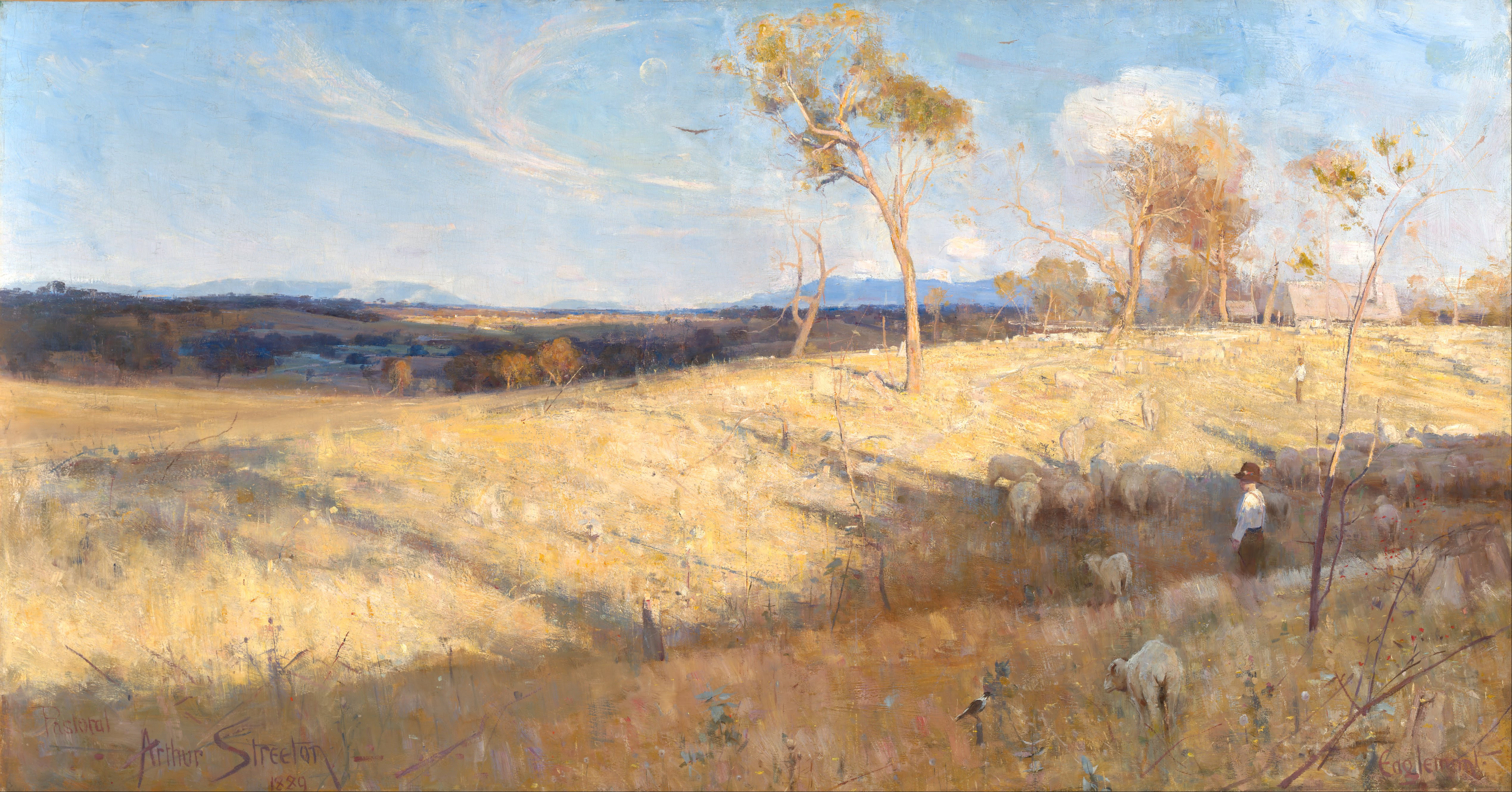
Golden Summer, Eaglemont, 1889, National Gallery of Australia

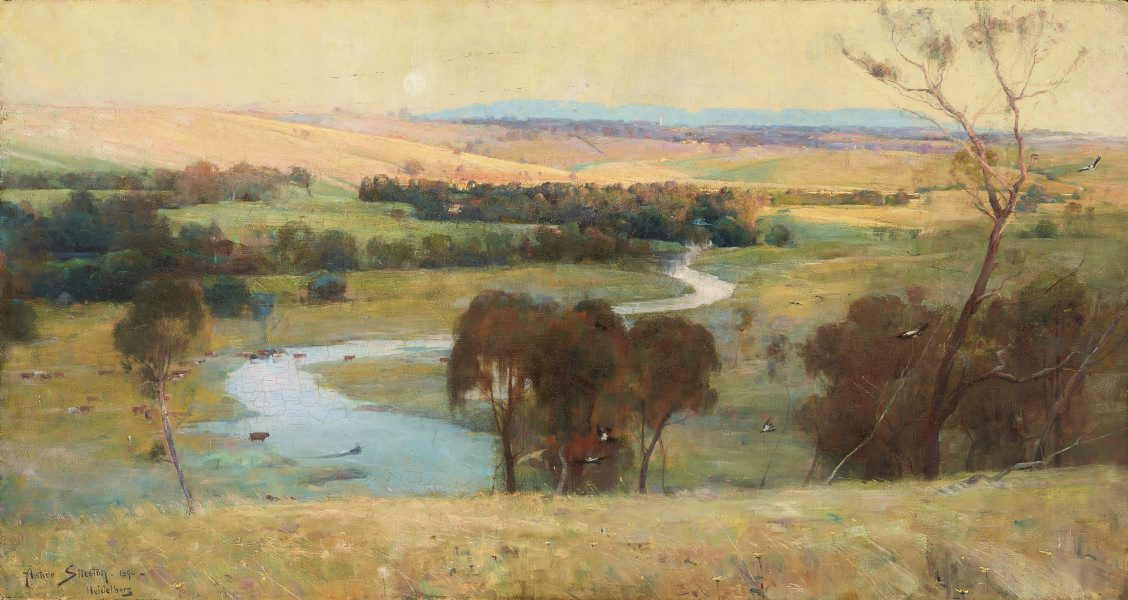
'Still glides the stream, and shall for ever glide', 1890, Art Gallery of New South Wales

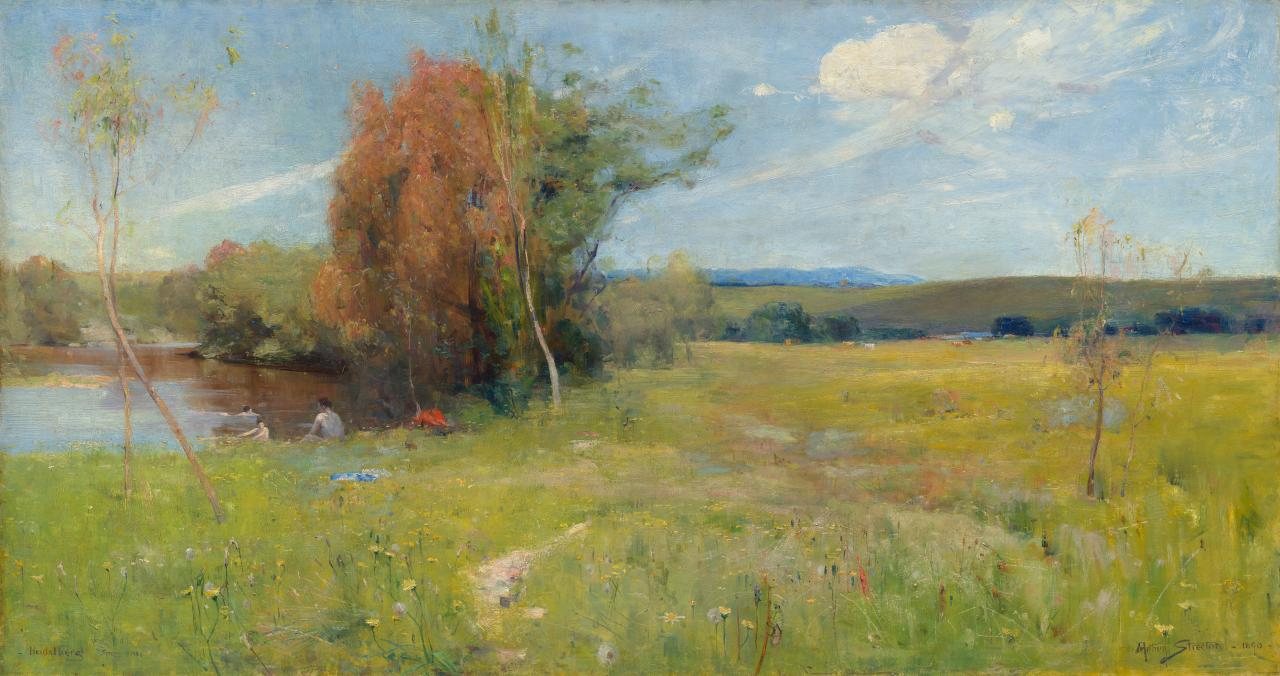
Spring, 1890, National Gallery of Victoria

Streeton spent the first few nights at Eaglemont alone with the estate's tenant farmer Jack Whelan (who appears in Streeton's "pioneer" painting The selector's hut (Whelan on the log), 1890), and slept upon the floor, the rooms being bare of furniture. Of his first few nights at the house, Streeton said it was "creaking and ghostly. A long dark corridor seemed full of past visions, and out of doors a blurred rich blackness against the sharp brilliance of the Southern Cross ... But tobacco and wine weighed healthily against the darkness". He descended the hill daily to Heidelberg village for meals before jaunting into the bush with a billycan of milk and swag of paints and canvases. The first artists to paint with Streeton at Eaglemont were the National Gallery students Aby Altson and John Llewellyn Jones, followed by John Mather and Walter Withers. Like Streeton, Withers painted from nature amidst suburban bush around Melbourne, employing earthy colours with loose, impressionistic brushstrokes. By the end of 1888, he became a weekend visitor to the camp.

About the same time, Streeton met the artist Charles Conder, who travelled down from Sydney in October 1888 at the invitation of Tom Roberts. One year Streeton's junior, Conder was already a committed plein airist, having been influenced by the painterly techniques of expatriate impressionist Girolamo Nerli. Conder and Roberts joined Streeton at Eaglemont in January 1889 and helped make some modest improvements to the house. Despite austere living conditions, Streeton felt content: "Surrounded by the loveliness of the new landscape, with heat, drought, and flies, and hard pressed for the necessaries of life, we worked hard, and were a happy trio." Streeton and Conder quickly became friends and influenced one another's art. Their shared love of South Australian poet Adam Lindsay Gordon's lyrical verse is revealed in the titles of some of their Eaglemont paintings, including Streeton's romantic gloaming work 'Above us the great grave sky' (1890, taken from Gordon's poem "Doubtful Dreams"). Later, critics would describe some of the pair's Eaglemont paintings as companion pieces, as both artists often painted the same views and subjects using a high-keyed "gold and blue" palette, which Streeton considered "nature's scheme of colour in Australia".

Two of Streeton's best-known works were painted during this period—Golden Summer, Eaglemont (1889) and 'Still glides the stream, and shall for ever glide' (1890)—each a sunlit pastoral scene of golden-paddocked plains stretching to the distant blue Corhanwarrabul. In 1891, Arthur Merric and Emma Minnie of the Boyd artistic dynasty took Golden Summer, Eaglemont to Europe where it became the first painting by an Australian-born artist to be exhibited at the Royal Academy, London, and was awarded a Mention honourable at the 1892 Paris Salon.

=== Sydney and travels inland ===
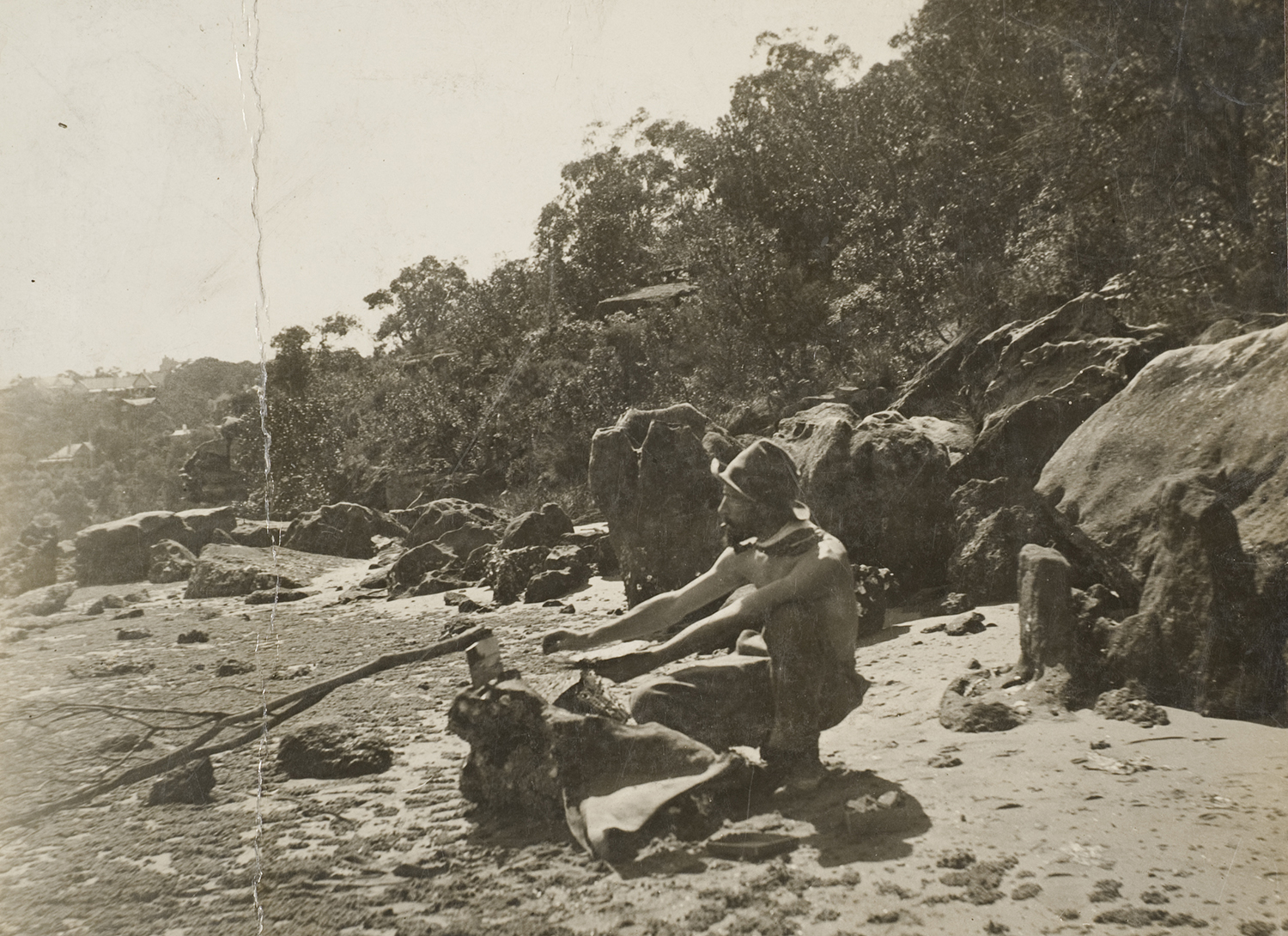
Streeton painting en plein air at Curlew Camp, Sydney Harbour

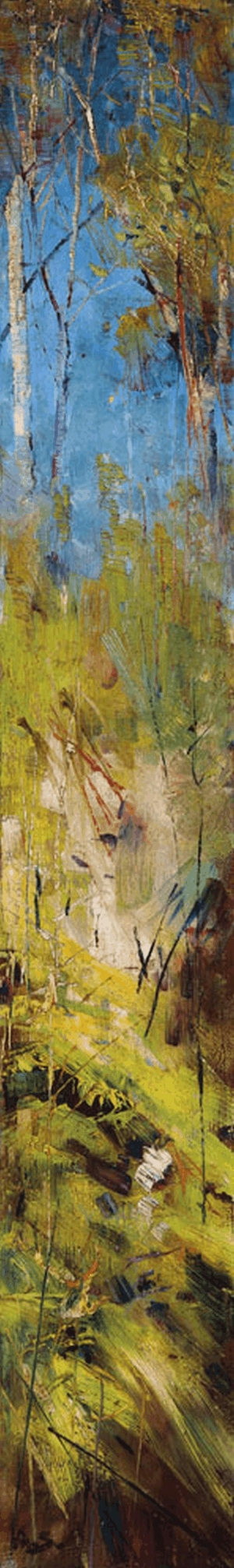
In Sydney, Streeton produced many paintings with extreme horizontal or vertical orientations (Pictured: Sirius Cove, 1895).

On 2 June 1890, in the wake of an economic depression in Melbourne, Streeton sailed to Sydney, and initially stayed there with his sister in the suburb of Summer Hill. He soon relocated to Curlew Camp, a plein air artists' camp on Sydney Harbour, where he painted many views of his natural surroundings and was visited by a number of artists, including Julian Ashton and Albert Henry Fullwood, who stayed at the camp for extended periods. Tom Roberts later joined him also, continuing their artistic friendship. From 1891, Streeton began travelling widely in rural New South Wales. As well as painting scenes of Sydney Harbour and Coogee, and urban scenes of Sydney, it was during the early to mid-1890s that he painted some of his major rural landscapes, including the Hawkesbury River series and 'Fire's on.

Sydney Harbour inspired many of Streeton's most poetic Symbolist paintings, a number of which infuse the Australian landscape with mythological subjects. The city also spurred his interest in the decorative arts as he painted on fans, furniture, musical instruments and other objects. The influence of Japanese art, such as kakemono (hung scrolls), is evidenced in the extreme vertical formats and compositional elements he favoured around this time.

In 1893, Streeton wrote in Sydney's Daily Telegraph criticising a proposal by a mining company to develop a colliery on the shores of Sydney Harbour, which would necessitate the cutting down of a great many gum trees. His letter, which came to be known as "Streeton's shriek", read in part:

It seems likely that charming Cremorne is to pass away and leave a dismal eyesore ... Where once was youth with their sweethearts in white muslin gathered joyfully for merriment and sport, making Cremorne a happy pastoral, we would have instead a numerous fleet of grimy coal ships, hulks, smoke and darkness.

The letter helped raise public alarm over the proposal, and in 1895, Streeton painted Cremorne pastoral, his largest harbour composition, as "an elegiac image of what [he] believed would be lost" if the project went head. When it went on exhibition later that year, the Art Gallery of New South Wales acquired the work and publicly endorsed Streeton's protests. The government, in the face of mounting backlash, was forced to abandon the mining project. Cremorne pastoral's status as an environmental protest painting is considered groundbreaking in Australian art history.

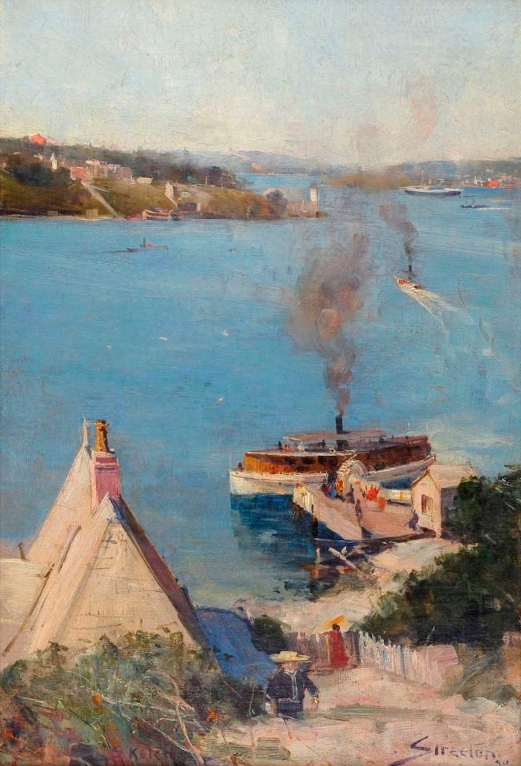
McMahon's Point Ferry, 1890, private collection

Fire's on, 1891, Art Gallery of New South Wales

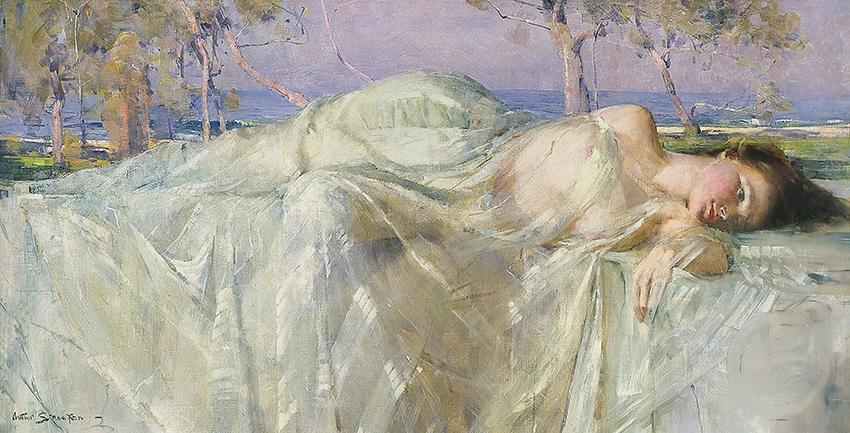
Oblivion, 1892, private collection

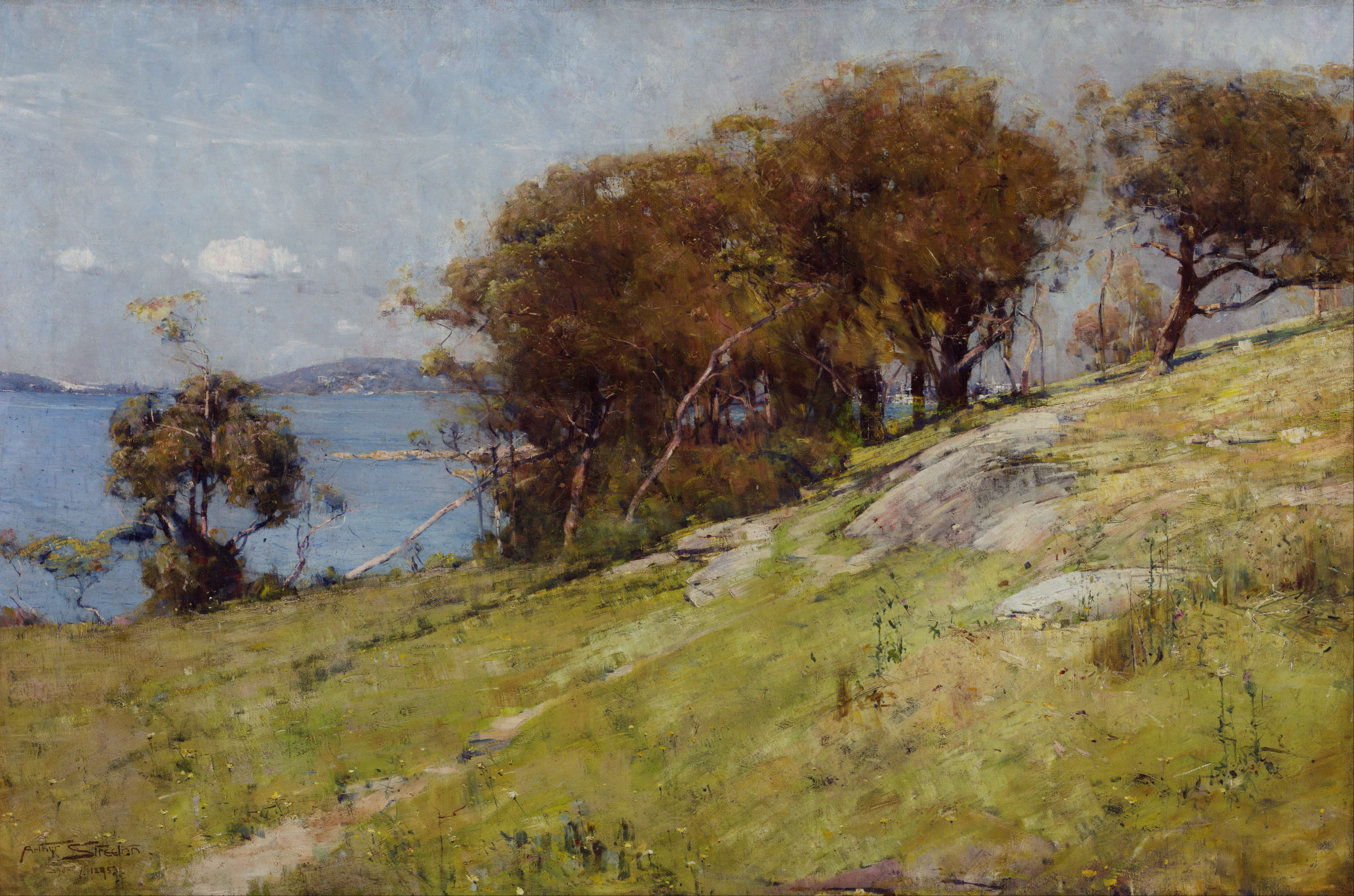
Cremorne pastoral, 1895, Art Gallery of New South Wales

=== Overseas and life in England ===
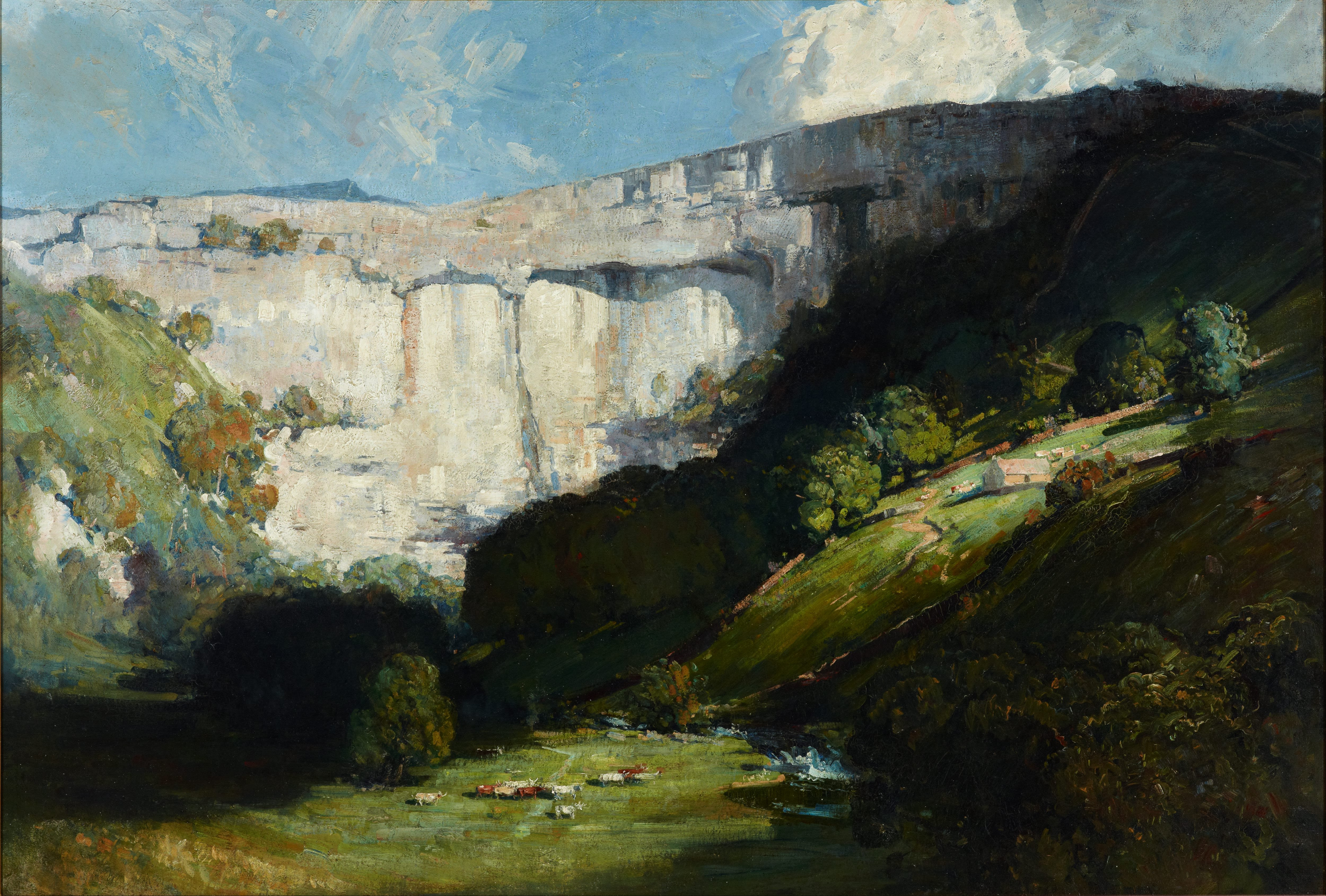
Malham Cove, c. 1911, Art Gallery of New South Wales

In 1897 Streeton sailed for London on the Polynesian, stopping at Port Said before continuing on via Cairo and Naples. He held an exhibition at the Royal Academy in 1900 and became a member of the Chelsea Arts Club in 1903. Although he had developed a considerable reputation in Australia, he failed to achieve the same success in England. His trips to London were financed by the sales of his paintings at home in Australia.

His time in England reinforced a strong sense of patriotism towards the British Empire and, like many, anticipated the coming war with Germany with some enthusiasm. In 1906, Streeton returned to Australia and completed some paintings at Mount Macedon in February 1907 while staying with his patrons the Pinschofs at Hohe Warte. These included the notable five feet by three feet Australia Felix (a view from Mt. Toorong) and a number of other smaller paintings.

Streeton returned to London in October. He married Esther Leonora Clench, a Canadian violinist, in 1908 and paintings done during their honeymoon in Venice in September that year, including The Grand Canal, were exhibited in Australia in July 1909 as "Arthur Streeton's Venice". In Australia again in April 1914 he held exhibitions in Sydney and Melbourne and went back to England in early 1915.

=== War artist ===
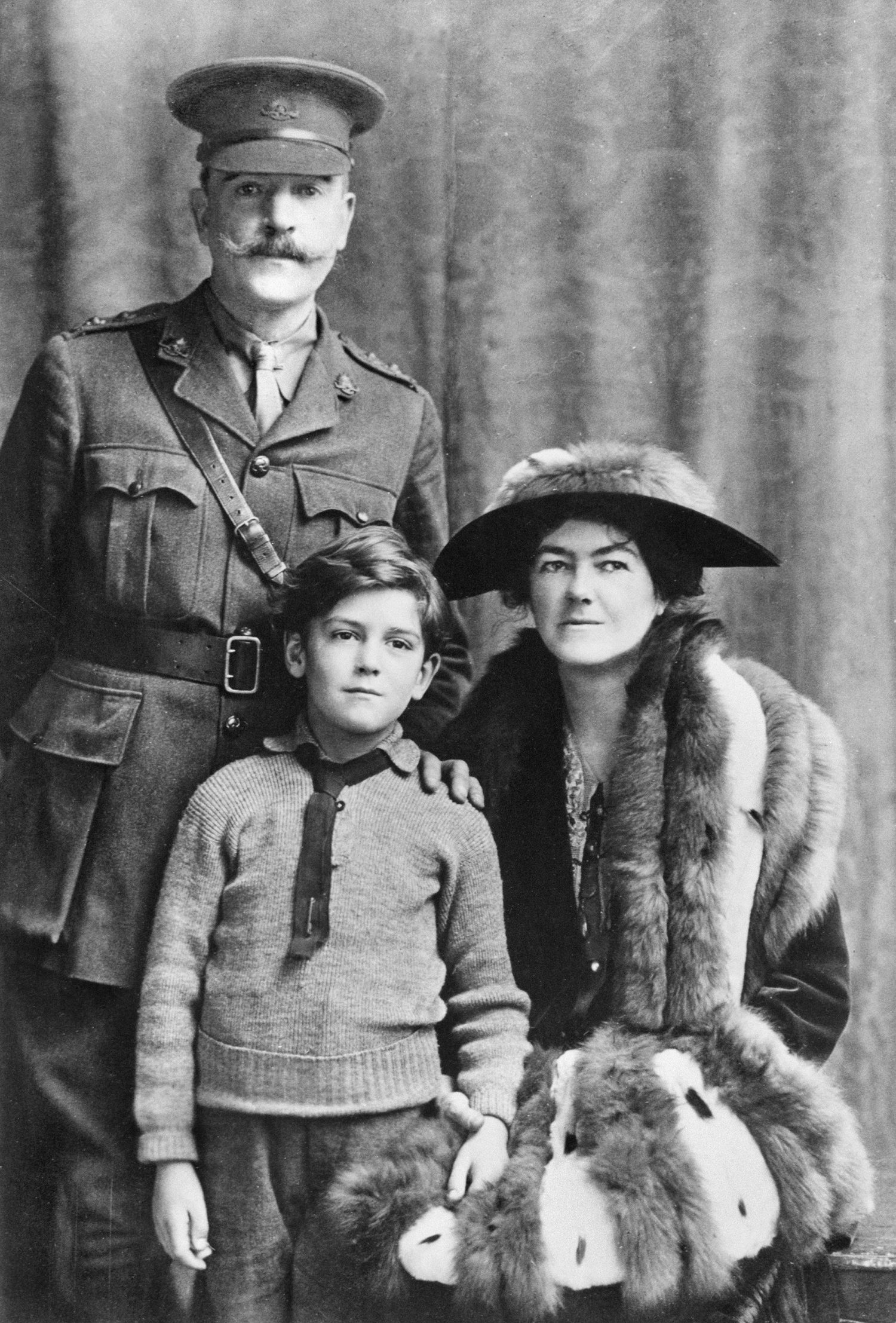
Studio portrait of Lieutenant Streeton, official war artist, with his son Oliver (Charles Ludwig Oliver) and wife Nora Clench, 1918

Along with other members of the Chelsea Arts Club, including Tom Roberts, he joined the Royal Army Medical Corps (British Army) at the age of 48. He worked at the 3rd London General Hospital in Wandsworth and reached the rank of corporal.

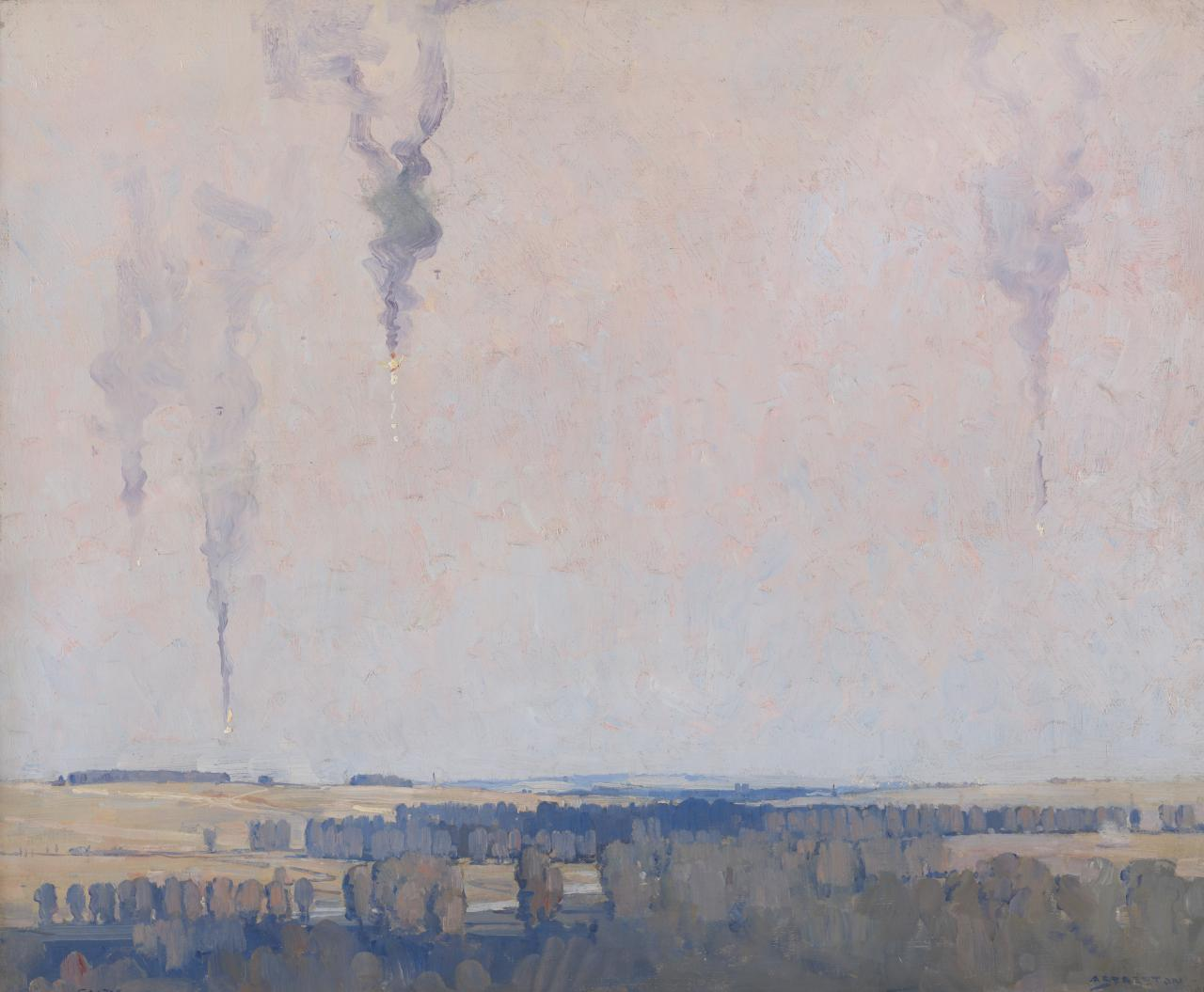
Balloons on fire, painted in Glisy, France, 1918

Streeton was made an Australian official war artist with the Australian Imperial Force, holding the rank of Honorary Lieutenant, and he travelled to France on 14 May 1918 and was attached to the 2nd Division, receiving his movement order on 8 May 1918. He worked in France, with a break in August, until October 1918. Expected by the Commonwealth to produce sketches and drawings that were "descriptive", Streeton concentrated on the landscape of the scenes of war and did not attempt to convey the human suffering. Unlike more famous military artists who depicted the definitive moments of battle, Streeton produced "military still life", capturing the everyday moments of the war. Streeton explained what was at that time an unconventional point of view – a perspective which was based in experience:

True pictures of battlefields are very quiet looking things. There's nothing much to be seen, everybody and thing is hidden and camouflaged.

Two paintings from this period, Villers Bretonneux (1918) and Boulogne (1918), are in the collection of the Art Gallery of New South Wales.

=== Later years ===
After the war, Streeton resumed painting in the Grampians and Dandenong Ranges. Streeton built Longacres, a house set on two hectares (five acres) at Olinda in the Dandenongs where he continued to paint, though in 1936 he complained that it 'tends to interfere with the gardening,' and only produced art for 'a couple of months in the year,' though he was then preparing a Sydney exhibition in time for his 70th birthday.

Streeton won the Wynne Prize in 1928 with Afternoon Light, Goulburn Valley. He was an art critic for The Argus from 1929 to 1935 and in 1937 was knighted for services to the arts.

Streeton died in September 1943 at Longacres and is buried at Ferntree Gully cemetery.

== Legacy ==
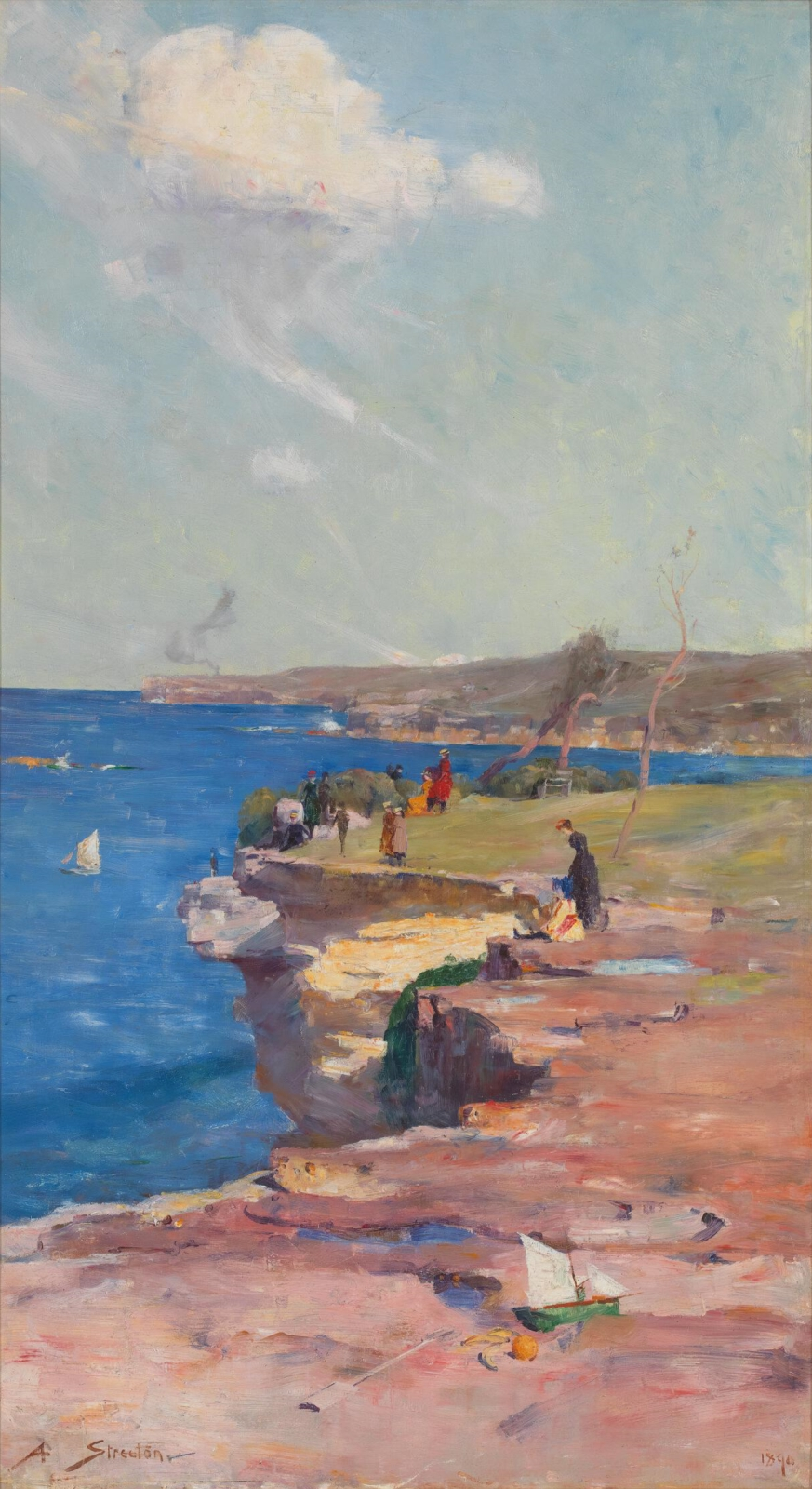
In 2015, Blue Pacific (1890) became the second painting by an artist outside Europe to hang in the permanent collection of England's National Gallery.

Streeton Drive, a main thoroughfare in Weston Creek is named after Sir Arthur, as is Streeton Primary School, in the Melbourne suburb of Yallambie.

There is also a memorial for Streeton just outside Geelong, Victoria.

In 2008, three expatriate Australian classical musicians living in Geneva, Switzerland founded a piano trio they named the Streeton Trio after the painter.

Streeton's works appear in many major Australian galleries and museums, including the National Gallery of Australia and state galleries, and the Australian War Memorial. In September 2015, Streeton's Coogee clifftop landscape Blue Pacific (1890) became the first painting by an Australian artist, and only the second painting by a Western artist outside Europe, to hang in the permanent collection of the National Gallery, London. It sits alongside major impressionist works by Claude Monet and Édouard Manet.

== Prices ==
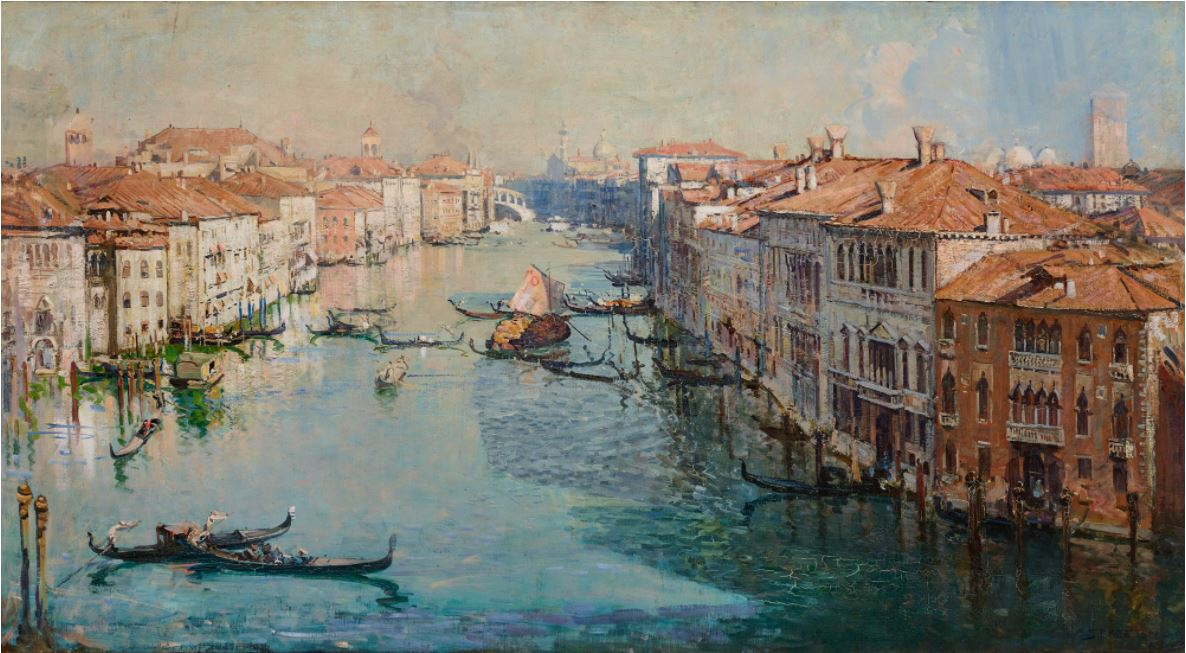
The Grand Canal, 1908

Streeton's paintings are amongst the most collectible of Australian artists and attracted high prices during his lifetime. Golden Summer, Eaglemont sold for around 1000 guineas in 1924 and in 1995 it was bought in a private sale by the National Gallery of Australia for A$3.5 million, both times setting a sales record for an Australian painting. In 1985, Settler's Camp sold at auction for A$800,000 and this remained the record auction price for Streeton's work until 23 May 2005, when his 1890 painting, Sunlight Sweet, Coogee, was sold for A$2.04 million (A$1.853 million before tax), becoming only the second painting by an Australian artist to exceed the A$2 million mark at auction (after Frederick McCubbin's 1892 work Bush Idyll, which sold for A$2.3 million in 1998). The painting was part of the Foster's Group collection and was sold at auction by Sotheby's. That record was eclipsed when, on 21 April 2021, Streeton's The Grand Canal (1908) was auctioned in Melbourne for A$3.068 million.

== Gallery ==
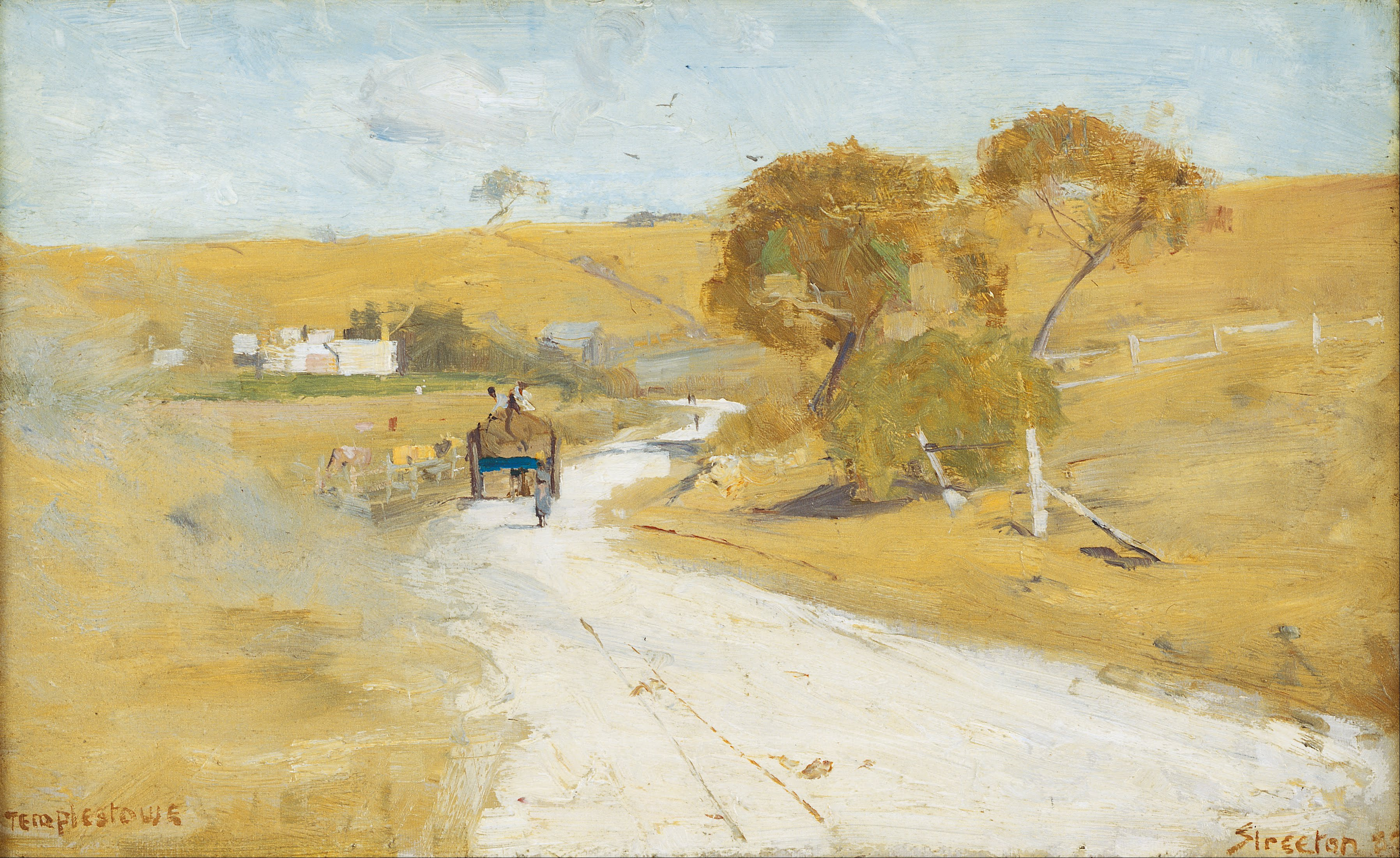
At Templestowe, 1889, Art Gallery of South Australia

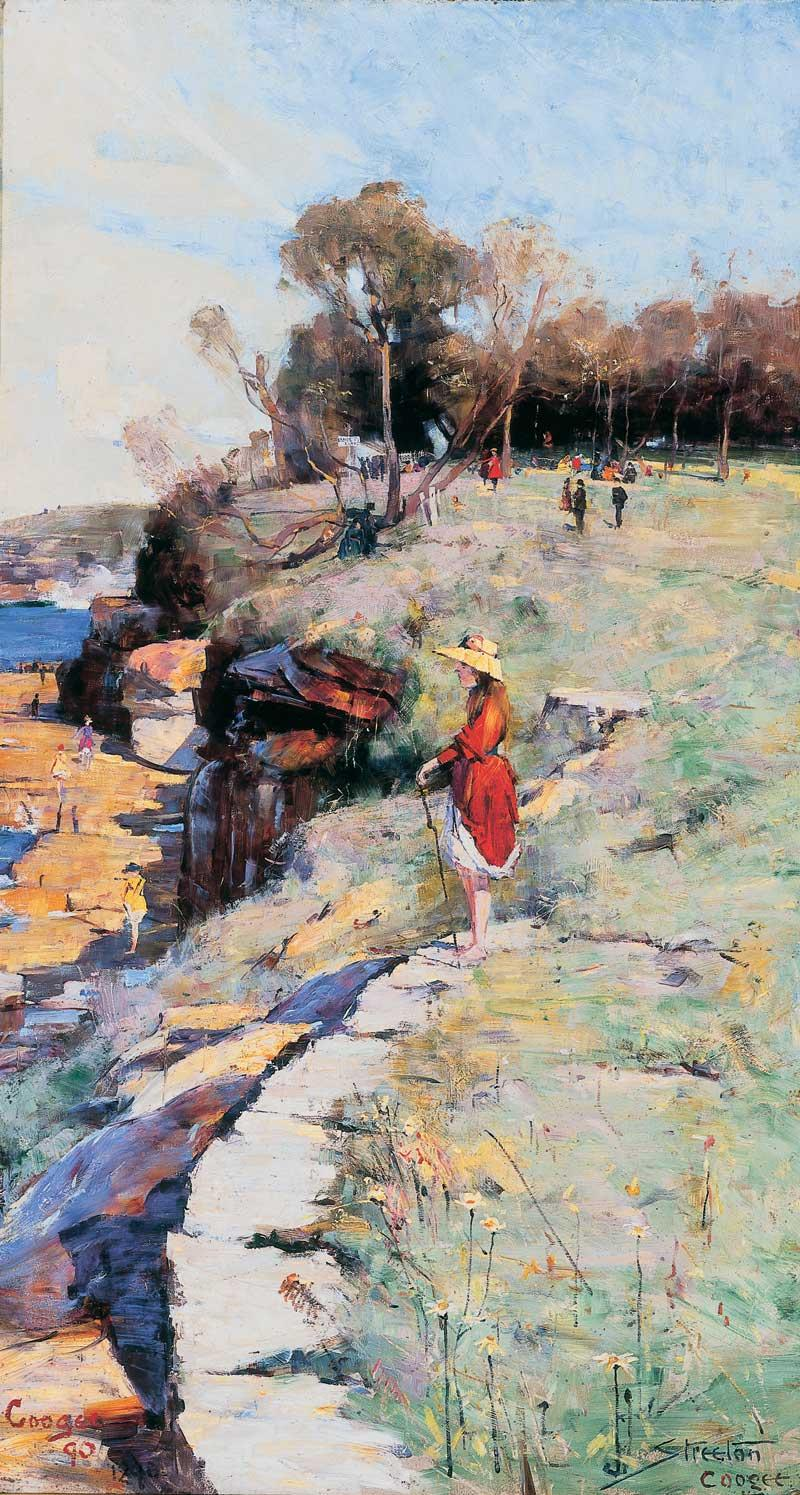
Sunlight Sweet, Coogee, 1890, private collection

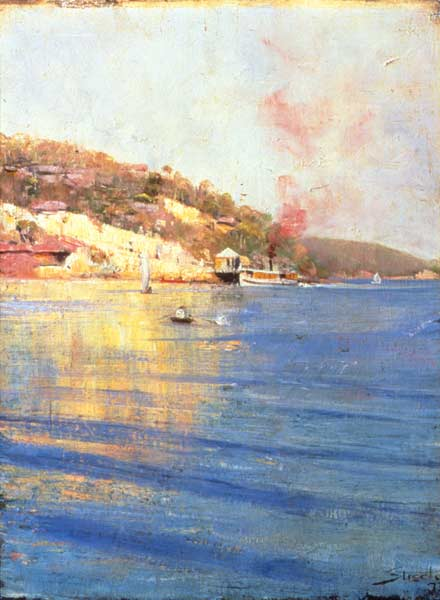
The Point Wharf, Mosman Bay, 1893, National Gallery of Australia

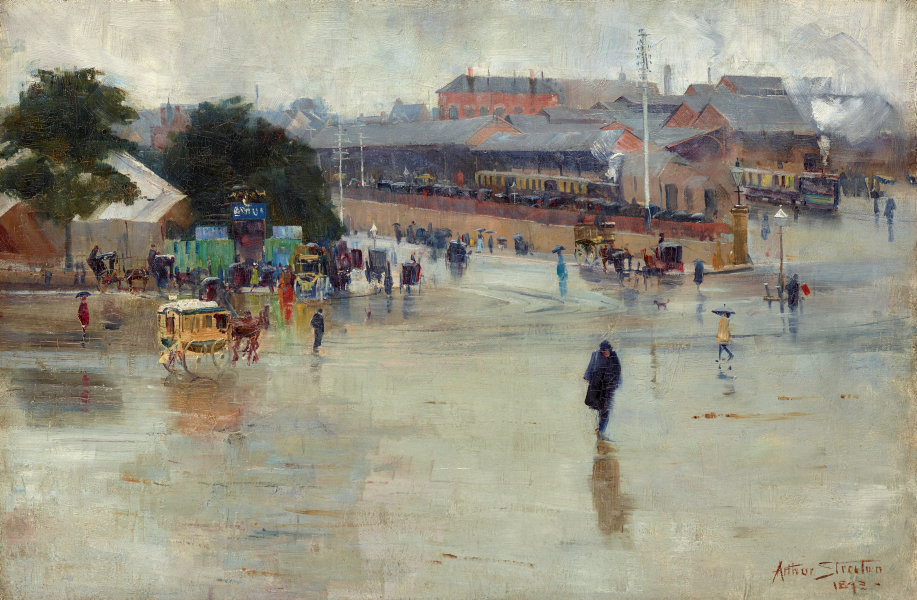
The Railway Station, Redfern, 1893, Art Gallery of New South Wales

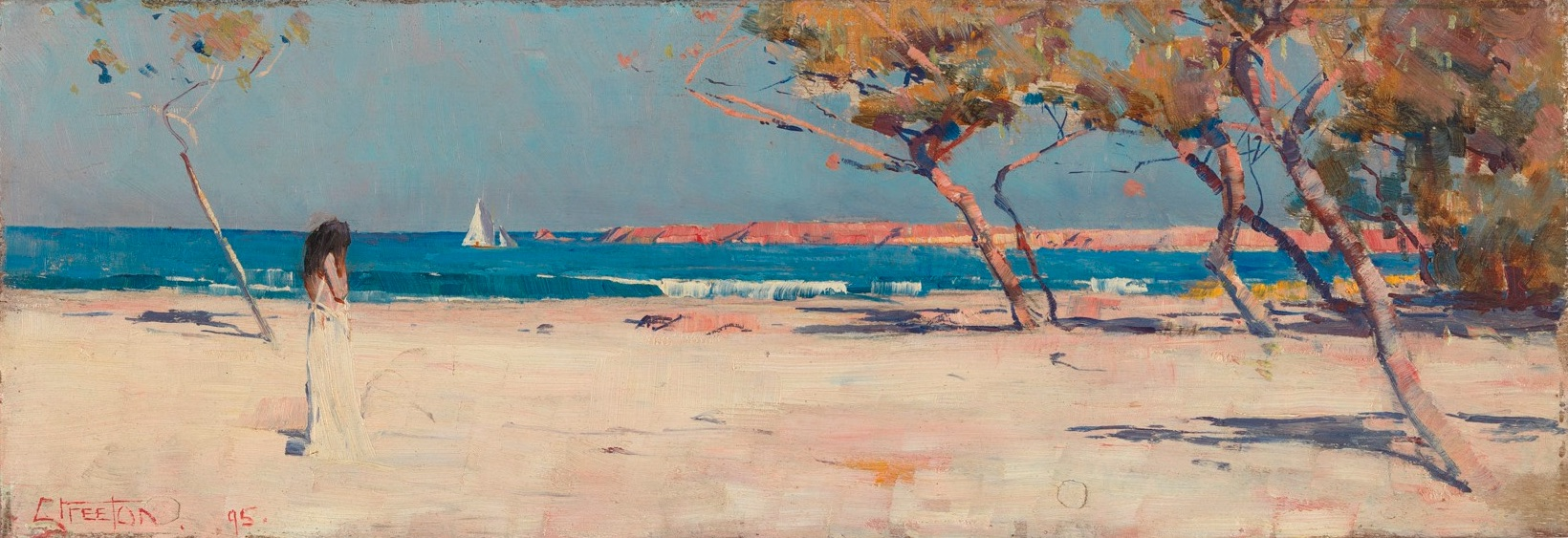
Ariadne, 1895, National Gallery of Australia

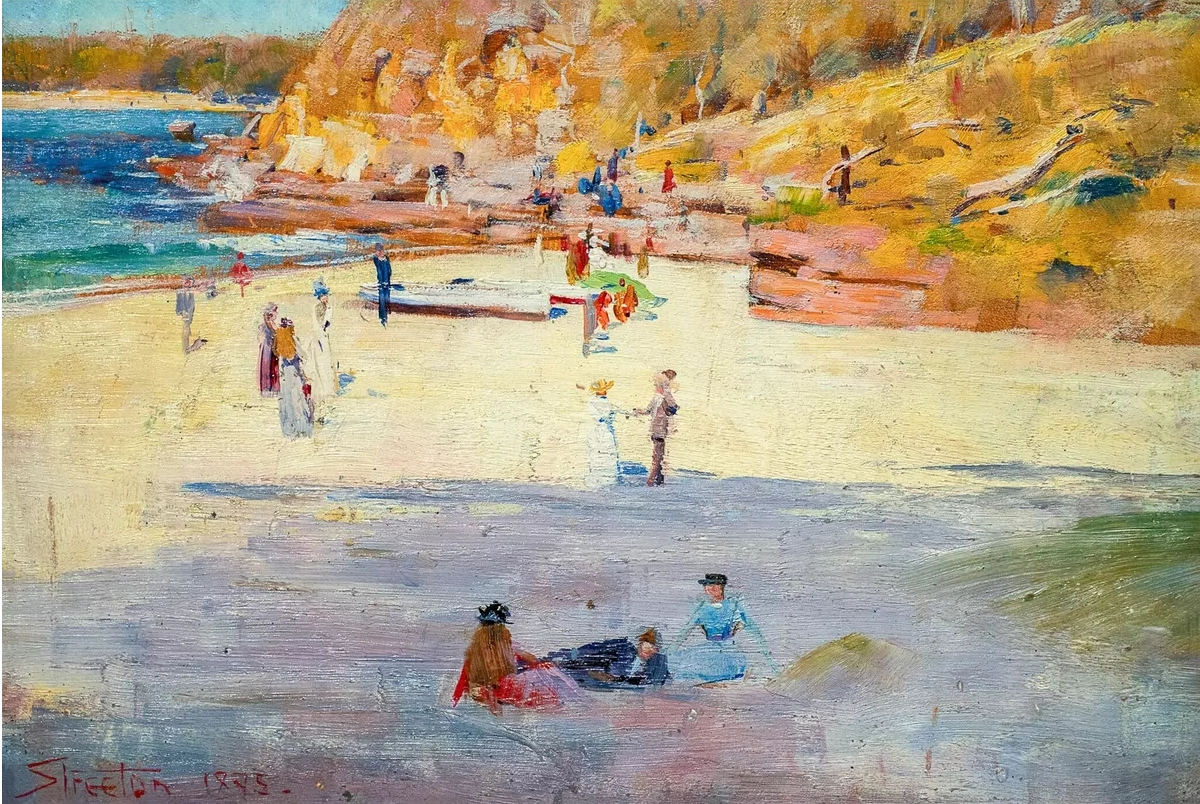
Manly Beach, 1895, Bendigo Art Gallery

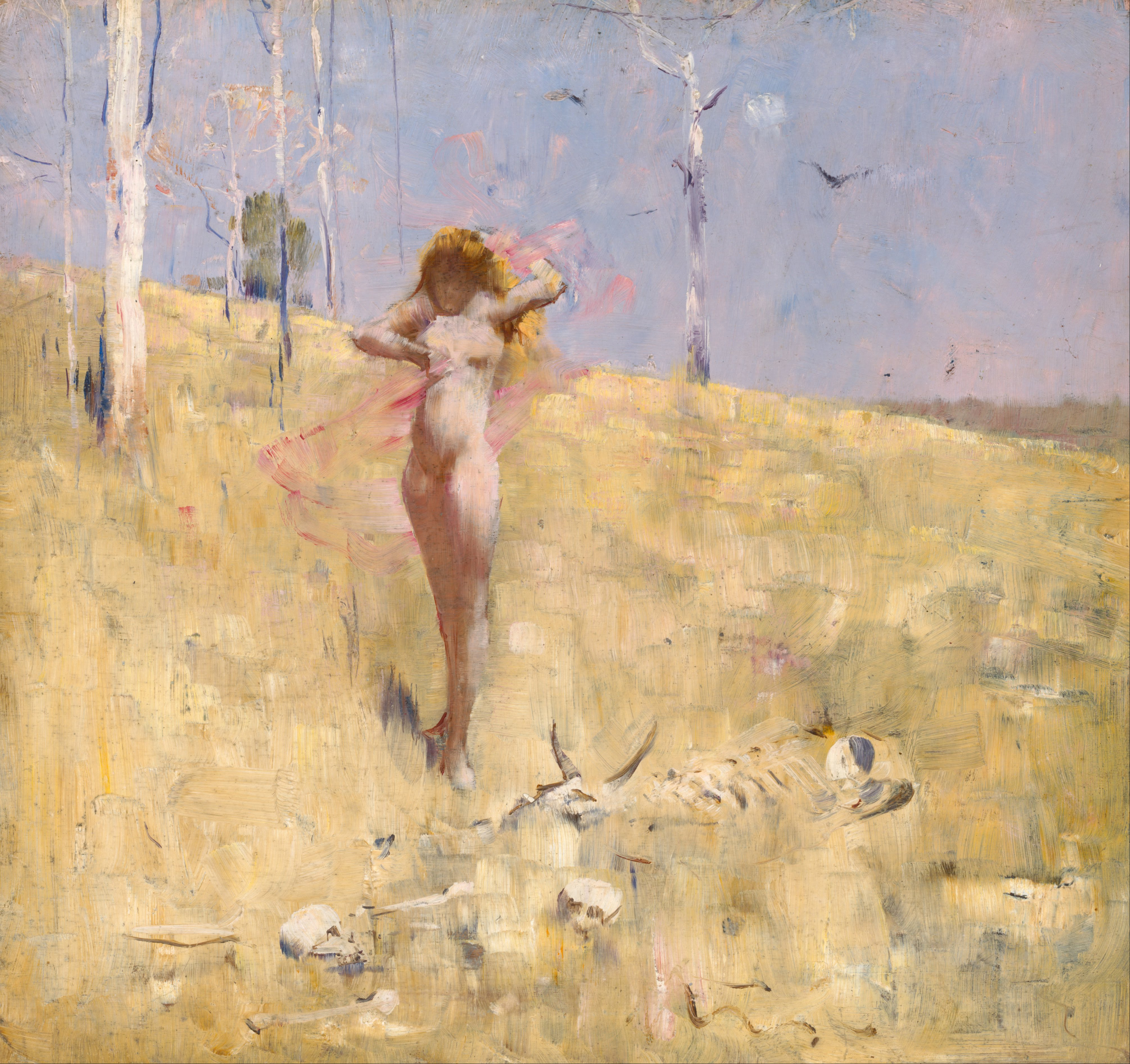
The Spirit of the Drought, 1895, National Gallery of Australia

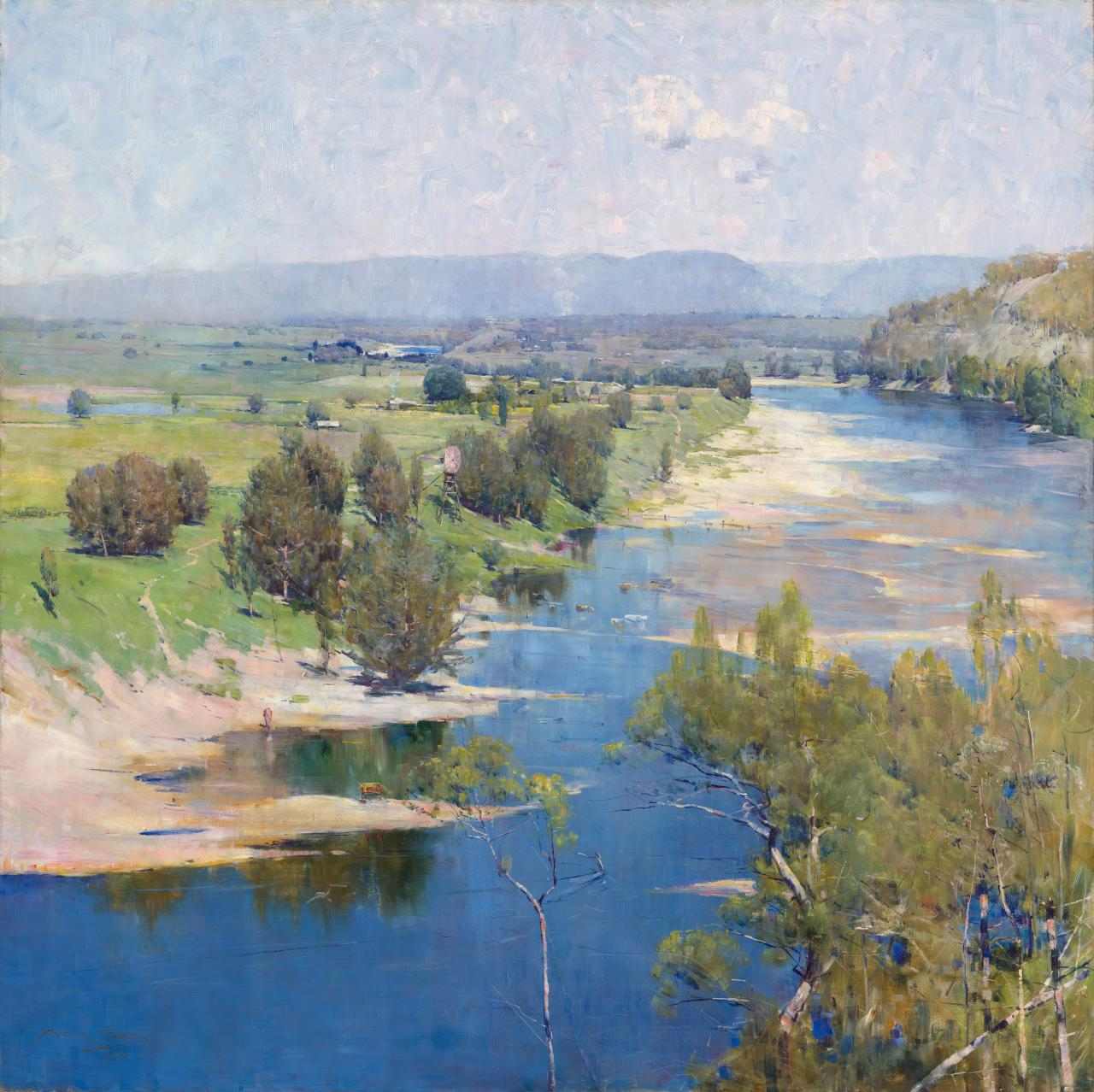
‘The purple noon's transparent might’, 1896, National Gallery of Victoria

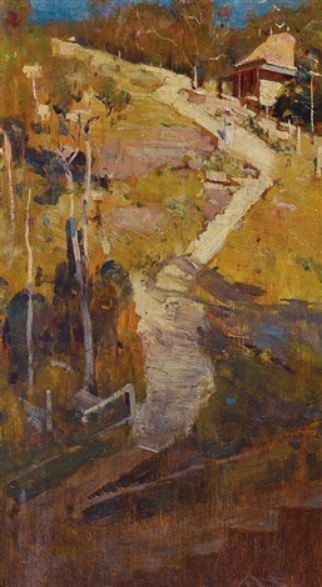
The Path to Podge Newton's, 1895, private collection

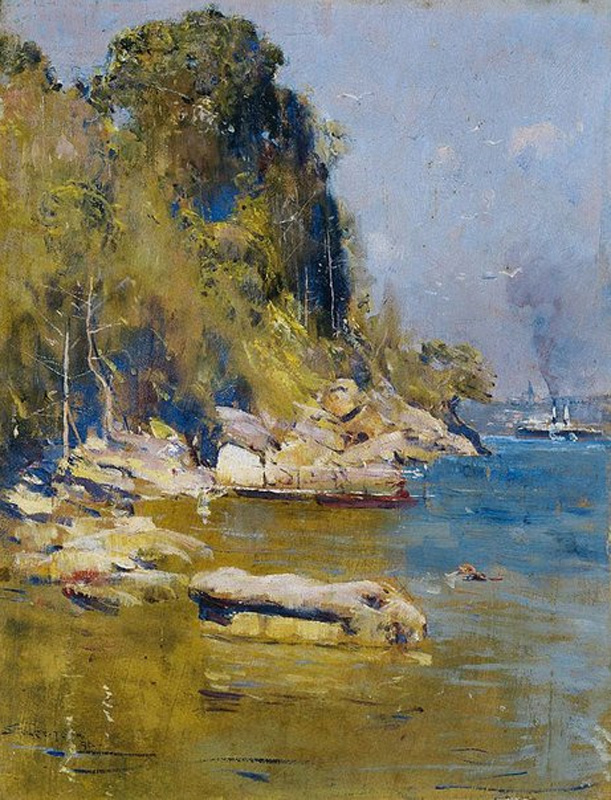
From My Camp, 1896, Art Gallery of New South Wales

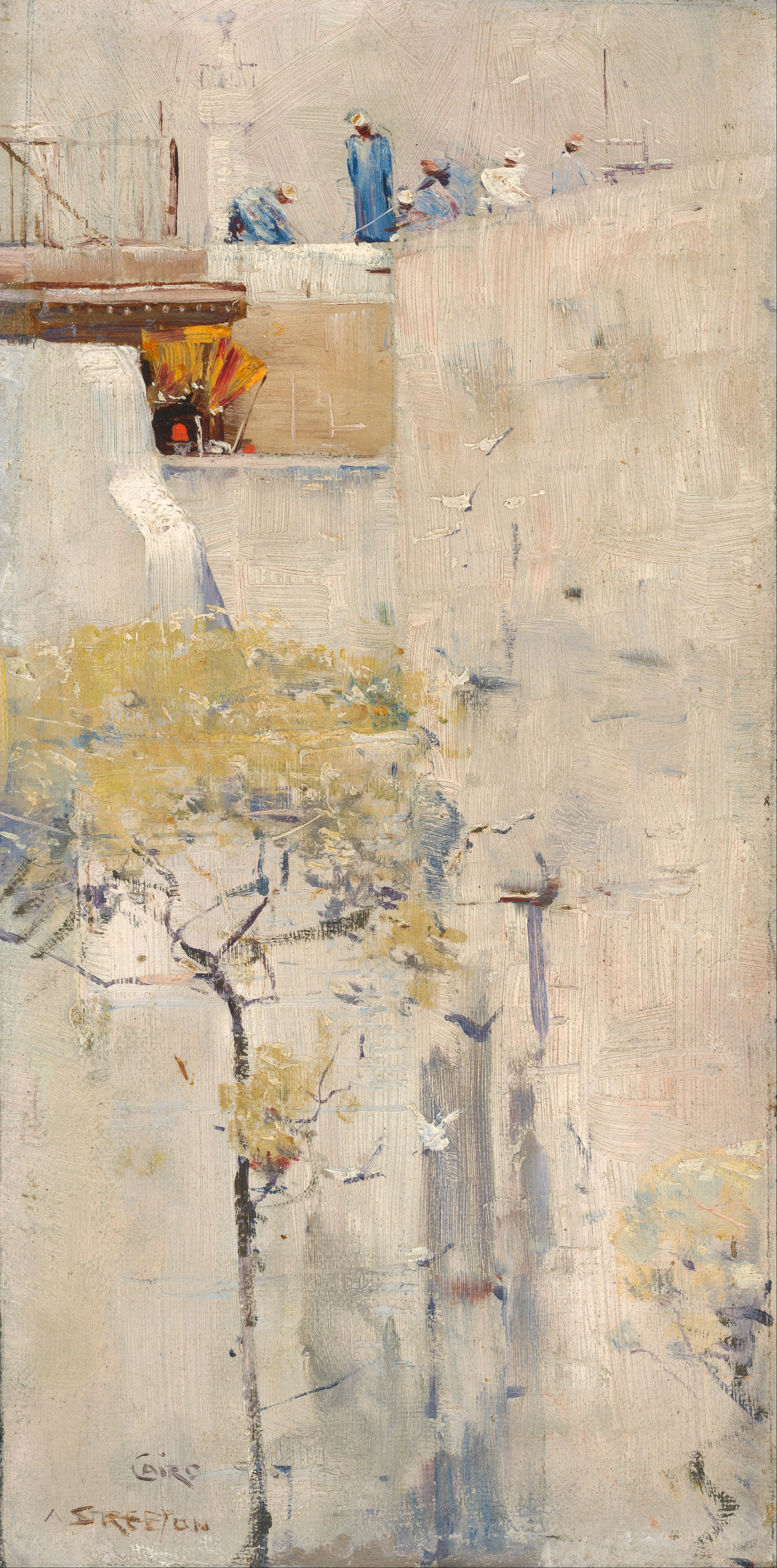
House builders, Cairo, 1897, National Gallery of Australia

Buffalo Mountains, view from Brent's Lookout, c.1913, Castlemaine Art Museum
