= Louis Buvelot =

Swiss-Australian landscape artist (1814–1888)

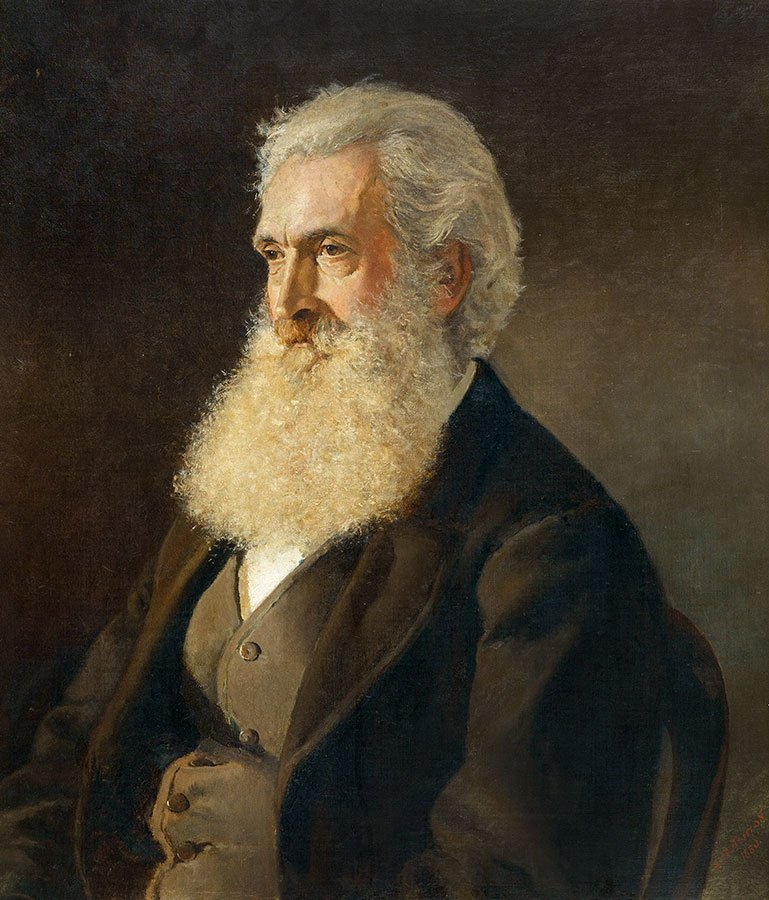
- Portrait of Louis Buvelot by Julian Ashton, 1880
- Born: Abram-Louis Buvelot; 3 March 1814; Morges, Vaud, Switzerland
- Died: 30 May 1888 (aged 74); Melbourne, Victoria, Australia
- Resting place: Kew Cemetery
- Known for: Landscape painting
- Movement: Plein air
- Spouses: Marie-Félicité Lalouette (born 1816); Caroline-Julie Beguin (1825–1902)
- Awards: Order of the Rose

Abram-Louis "Louis" Buvelot (French pronunciation: [lwi byvlo]; 3 March 1814 – 30 May 1888) was a Swiss landscape painter who lived 17 years in Brazil, and following 5 years back in Switzerland, stayed 23 years in Australia, where he influenced the Heidelberg School of painters.

== Biography ==
Buvelot was born on 3 March 1814 in Morges, Vaud, Switzerland, second son of François Simeon Buvelot, postal official, and his wife Jeanne-Louise née Heizer, a school teacher.

Buvelot got a job teaching art at a private school in Switzerland. Buvelot's uncle had a plantation in Brazil. Buvelot lived in Brazil for four years in Bahia and Rio. He returned to Switzerland in 1852. He left his family in La Chaux-de-Fonds and sailed from Liverpool bound for Melbourne, Australia in 1864 accompanied by Caroline-Julie Beguin, a teacher.

Buvelot moved to Melbourne in 1865 for his health. He worked as a photographer for time before settling in Fitzroy.

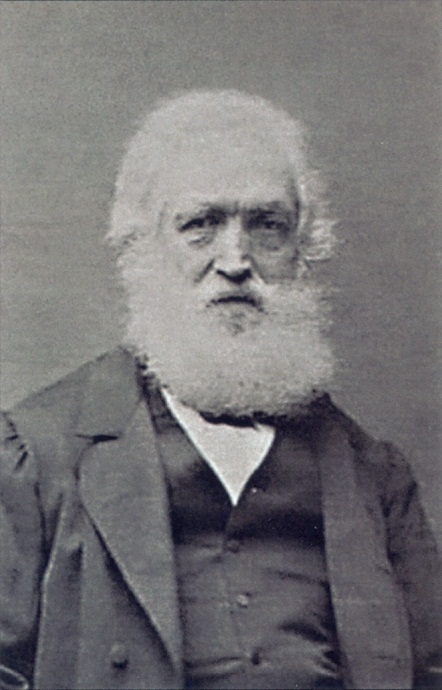
Louis Buvelot, c.1883

Buvelot died at his home on George St, Fitzroy on 30 May 1888. He was 75. He was buried at the Boroondara Cemetery, where a large monument was erected in his memory. Buvelot's widow, also an artist, died in 1902. The couple had no children.

Buvelot is best known for his great contribution to Australian art. His works, mostly oil landscapes, are quite well regarded, but perhaps his impact was even greater as a tutor of several members of the Heidelberg School, including Arthur Streeton, who named Buvelot's 1866 painting Summer Evening Near Templestowe the "first fine landscape painted in Victoria". His enthusiasm for plein air painting (that is, painting directly in the open air) was a key characteristic of those artists' work.

== Awards and honours ==
- Silver medal at an exhibition in Bern in 1856
- Two paintings purchased by the National Gallery of Victoria in 1869
- Gold medals at Melbourne exhibitions in 1873
- Silver medal at the Centennial Exposition in Philadelphia in 1876
- Gold medals at Melbourne exhibitions in 1880 and 1884
- A gallery at the NGV is named for him.

== Gallery ==
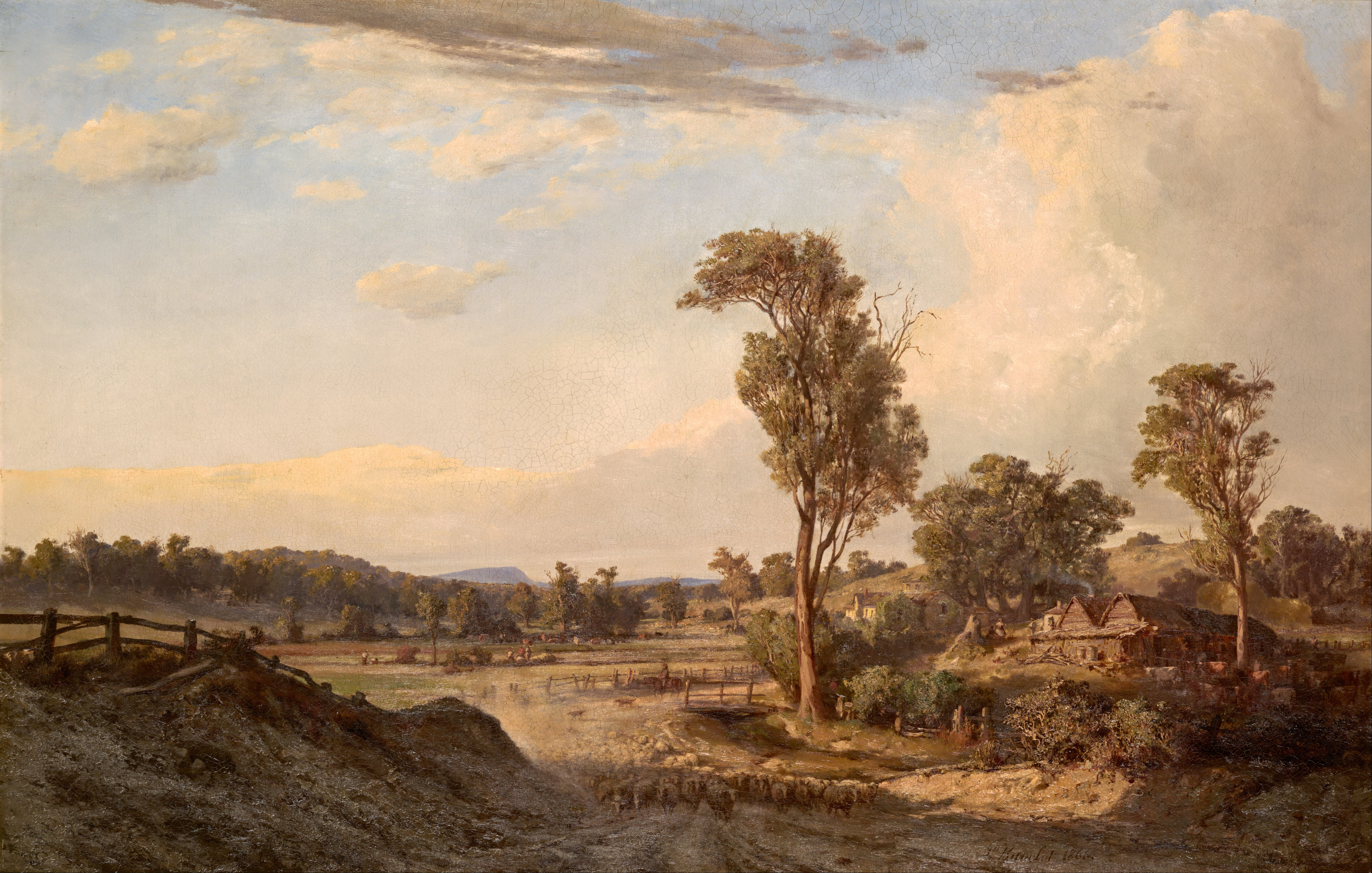
Summer Afternoon, Templestowe, 1866

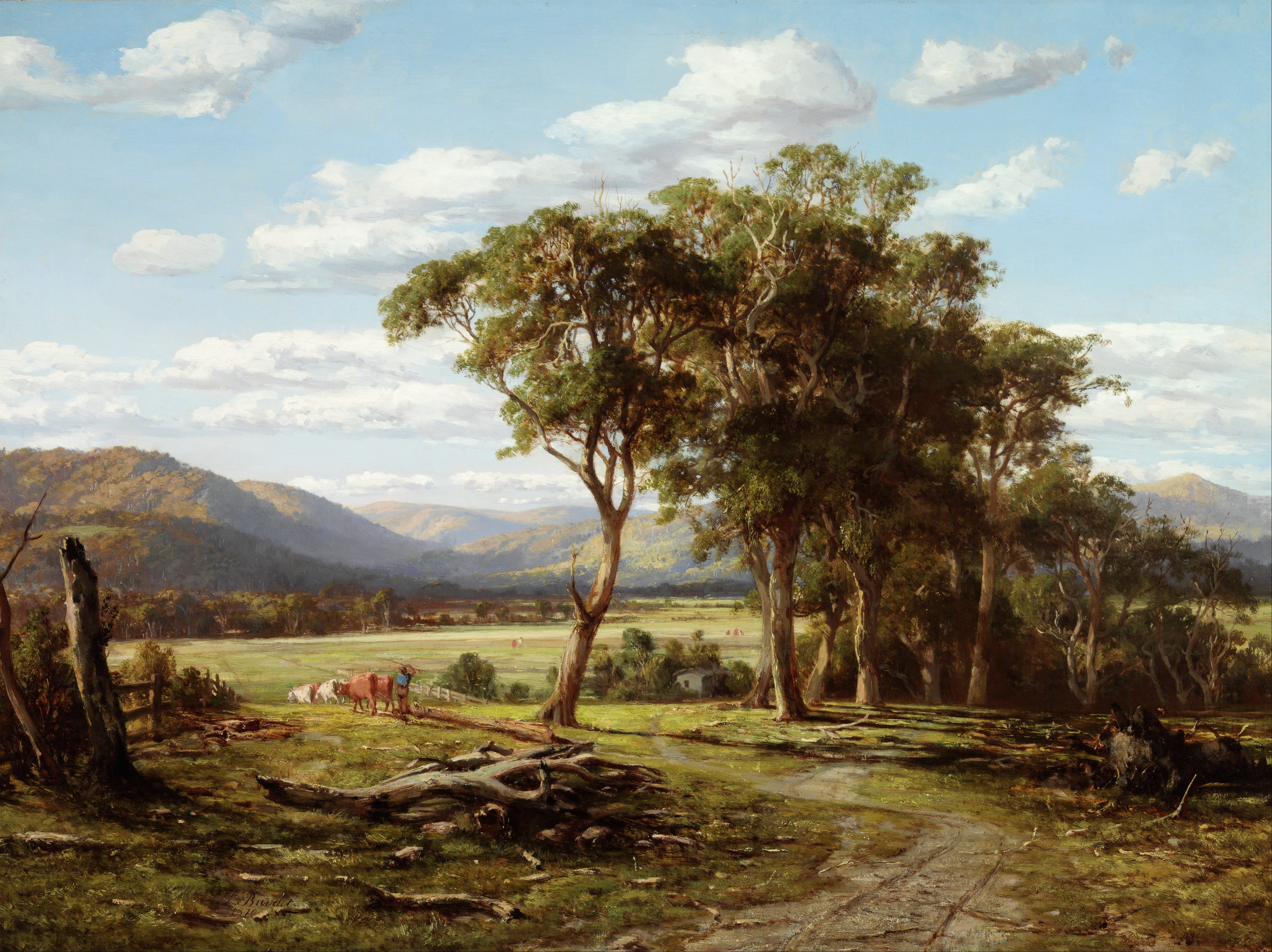
At Lilydale, 1870

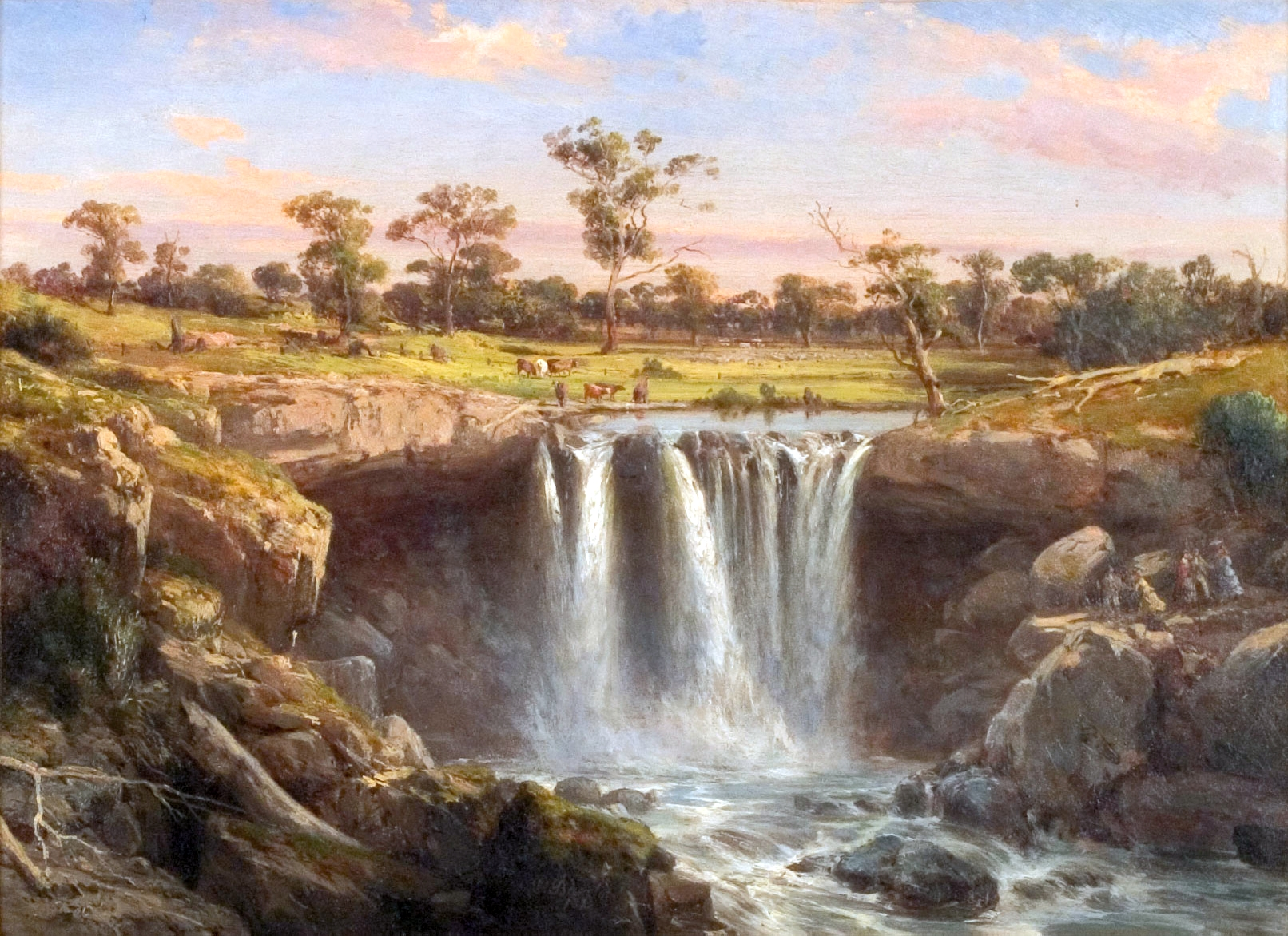
One of the Falls of the Wannon, 1872

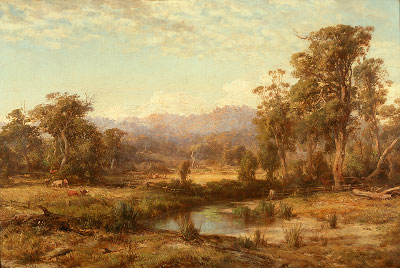
Macedon Ranges, 1874

== Collections ==
- National Gallery of Victoria, NGV also holds and his bust by Bertram Mackennal and a portrait in oils by J. C. Waite
- Art Gallery of New South Wales
- Art Gallery of Western Australia
- Art Gallery of Ballarat
- Geelong Gallery
- Castlemaine Art Museum
- Tate Gallery in London

== See also ==
- French Australians
- Australian art
