= The Grand Canal (Streeton) =

Painting by Arthur Streeton

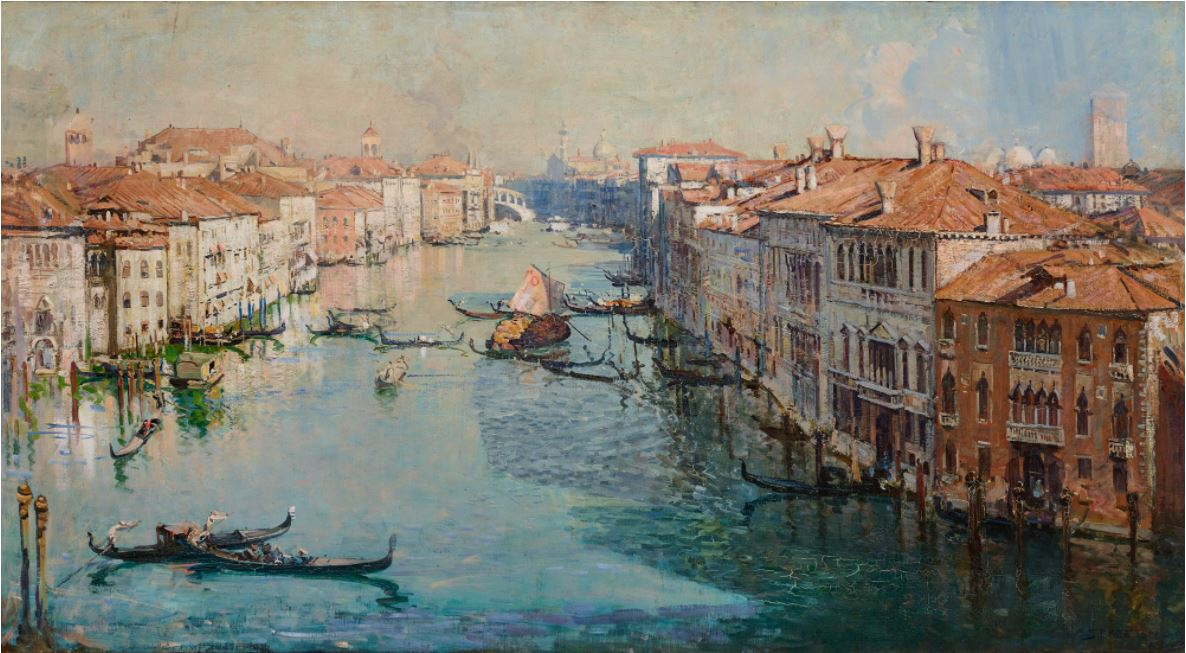
- Artist: Arthur Streeton
- Year: 1908
- Medium: Oil on canvas
- Dimensions: 92.0 cm × 168.5 cm (36.2 in × 66.3 in)
- Location: private collection

The Grand Canal is a 1908 painting by Australian artist Arthur Streeton. The work depicts the Grand Canal in Venice as seen from a viewpoint on Ca' Foscari.

To look anew though, and to appreciate Streeton's unique view of The Grand Canal, is to observe the stepped terracotta roofing, arranged in this picture euphoniously like a sequence of musical notes: the interconnected roofs of Venetian palaces, and other buildings. This sea of terracotta is given undeniable beauty: a key element of the vista, perfectly harmonised with the shimmering blue of both water and sky. Streeton's technical skill is shown in orchestrating this attractive palette, carefully dominated by two complementary colours, representing the Canale Grande and an optimistic sky counterpoised with palazzo rooftops

— Sarah Schmidt,

The work was acquired by Australian businessman Arthur Baillieu (father of arts patron Sunday Reed) in 1914. It later passed to his sister Amy Shackell and was subsequently privately held by her extended family; its whereabouts unknown to the broader art community. In 2018, the then head of the Hamilton Gallery, Sarah Schmidt "rediscovered" the painting in the family's private Western District home.

Streeton's contemporary, artist and gallery trustee Lionel Lindsay said of the painting: "Can I sufficiently acclaim it? All Streeton's powers are here concentrated as in his Centre of Empire, his mastery of composition and atmospheric truth, the distinction of his colour and touch".

Schmidt described the work as "assuredly among Arthur Streeton's very best, a glorious work capturing all of the splendor and beauty of Venice" and "the very pinnacle of Streeton's Venetian series and indeed, of his extensive body of European work".

The painting sold at auction in April 2021 for AUD3,068,180 to a private buyer, at the time a record price for a Streeton work.
