= Tom Humphrey (artist) =

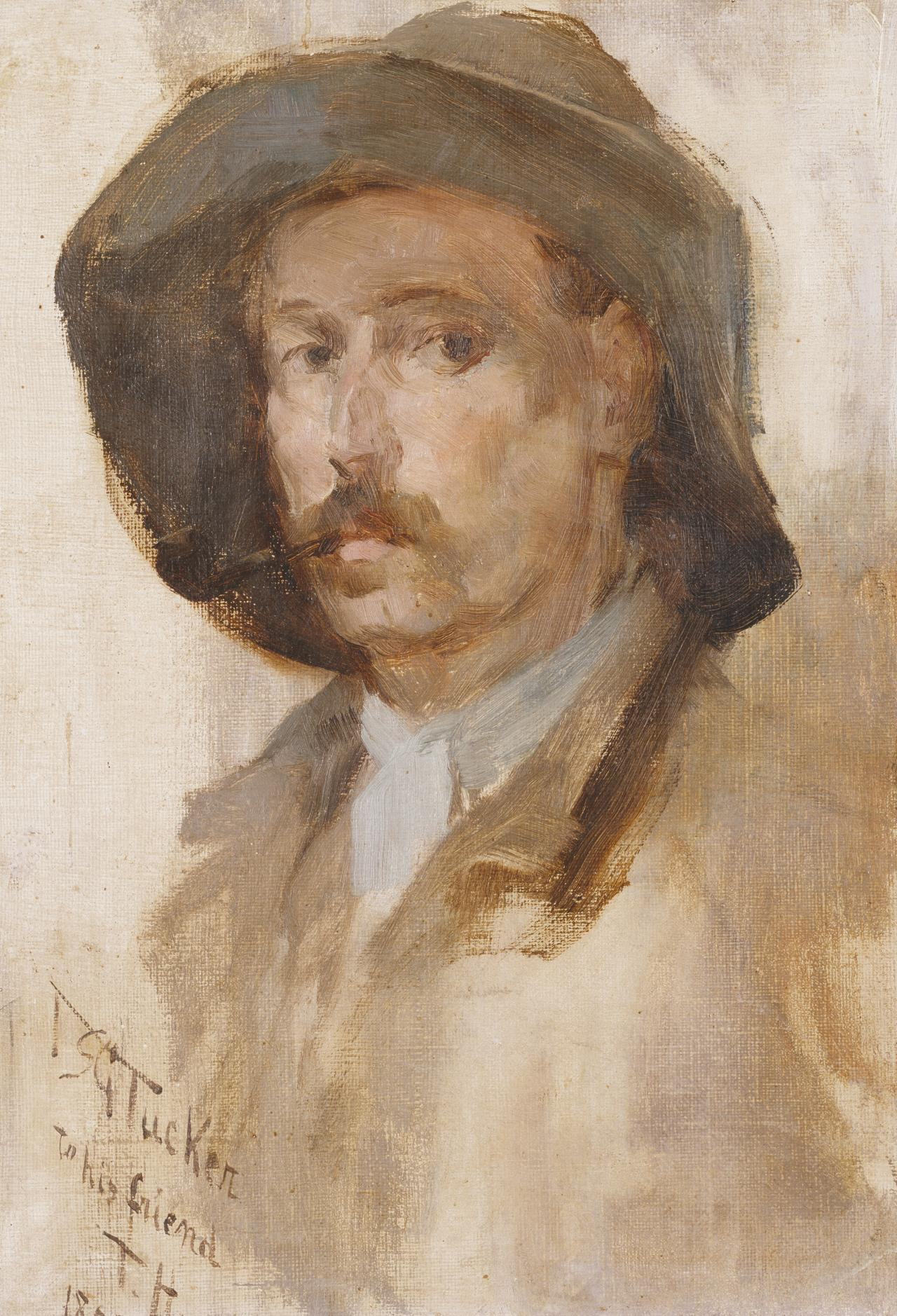
Sketch portrait of Humphrey by Tudor St George Tucker, 1894

Thomas Humphrey (1858 – 1922) was a Scottish-born Australian artist and photographer who was associated with the Heidelberg School art movement, also known as Australian impressionism.

Although a minor figure in the history of Australian art compared to Tom Roberts, Arthur Streeton and other members of the Heidelberg School, Humphrey won praise for his work from his contemporaries, and today he is represented in the permanent collections of several of Australia's major art galleries.

== Career ==
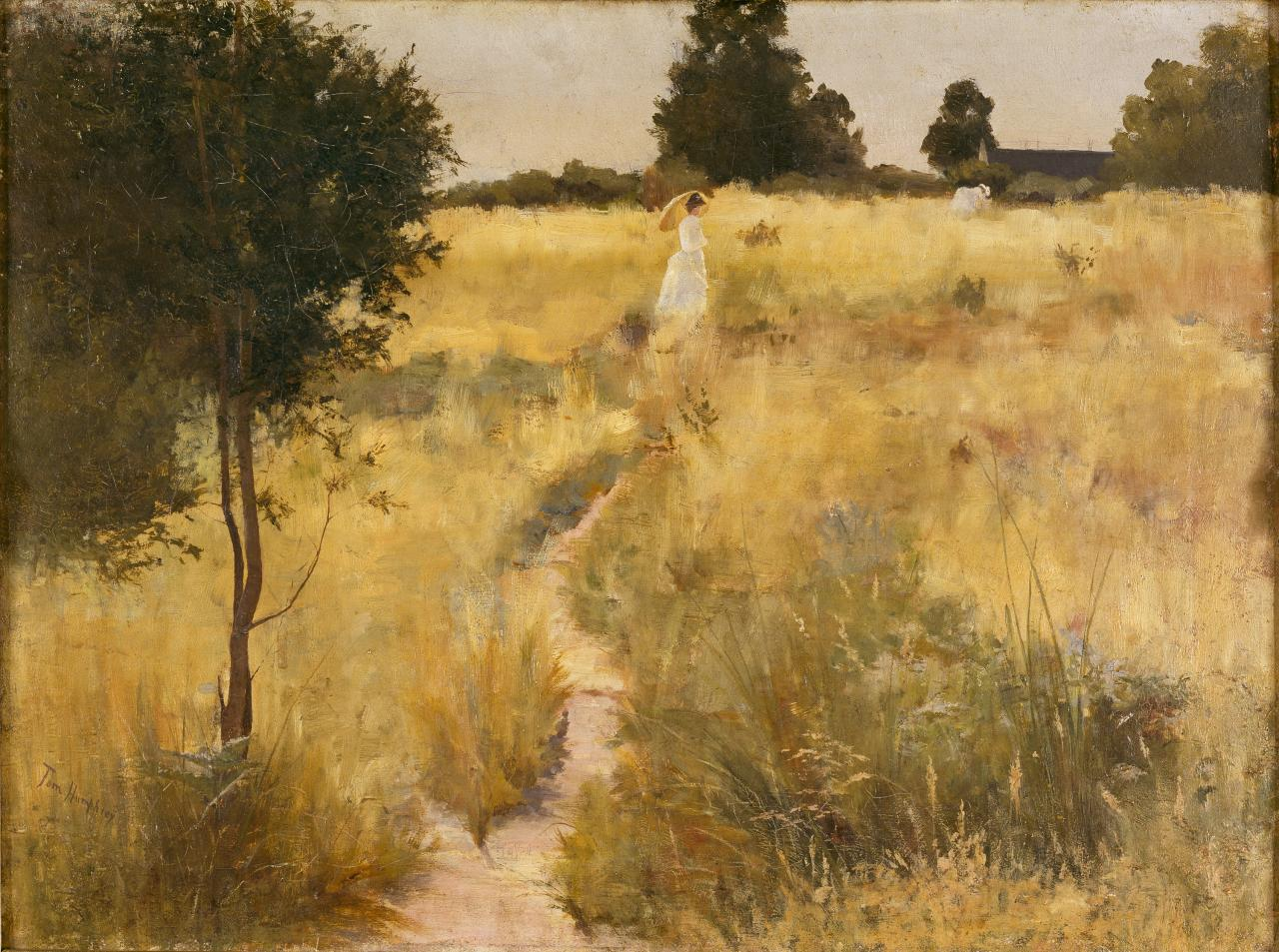
Summer Walk, 1888

Born in 1858 in Aberdeen, Scotland, Humphrey migrated as a young boy with his family to Australia, settling in the Melbourne suburb of Richmond. As a teenager, he studied part-time at the National Gallery of Victoria Art School and entered the photographic trade, where he worked with George Pitt Morison and eventually established his own photographic studio with his wife, Alice Mills.

In 1885, Humphrey befriended painter Tom Roberts, recently returned from art training in Europe. Together with Frederick McCubbin and John Mather they established the Box Hill artists' camp, devoting themselves to painting the Australian bush en plein air using impressionist techniques. Humphrey went on to paint at Arthur Streeton's Eaglemont camp in 1889, and the following year moved to Charterisville, where he lived with, and painted alongside fellow plein airists Walter Withers and Leon Pole.

In 1896, his riverscape Under a Summer Sun, painted the previous year, was acquired by the National Gallery of Victoria at a Victorian Artists' Society show. According to art critic Alan McLeod McCulloch, Under a Summer Sun was "probably the first Australian Impressionist work" bought by the museum. Since then, Humphrey's works have entered the permanent collections of both state and regional Australian galleries, including the Art Gallery of New South Wales and the Art Gallery of Ballarat.

Throughout much of his life, Humphrey was plagued by health problems which, together with the demands of running a photographic studio, limited his ability to paint. He died at his residence in Armadale in 1922. His first one-man show was held posthumously in 1925 at the Fine Art Society's Gallery on Exhibition Street, Melbourne. In a foreword to the exhibition's catalogue, Roberts wrote that Humphrey expressed in his works "the intimate and tender spirit of the Bush in its quiet moods", and that, despite his health problems, he "looked forward to a time of leisure for uninterrupted converse with nature."

== Selected paintings ==
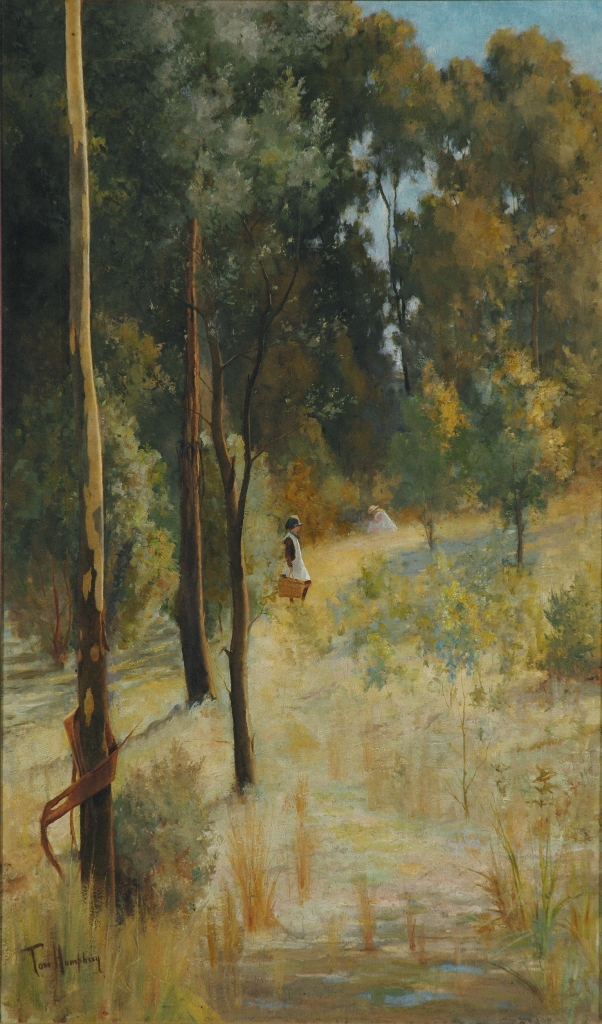
The Way to School, 1887, Warrnambool Art Gallery

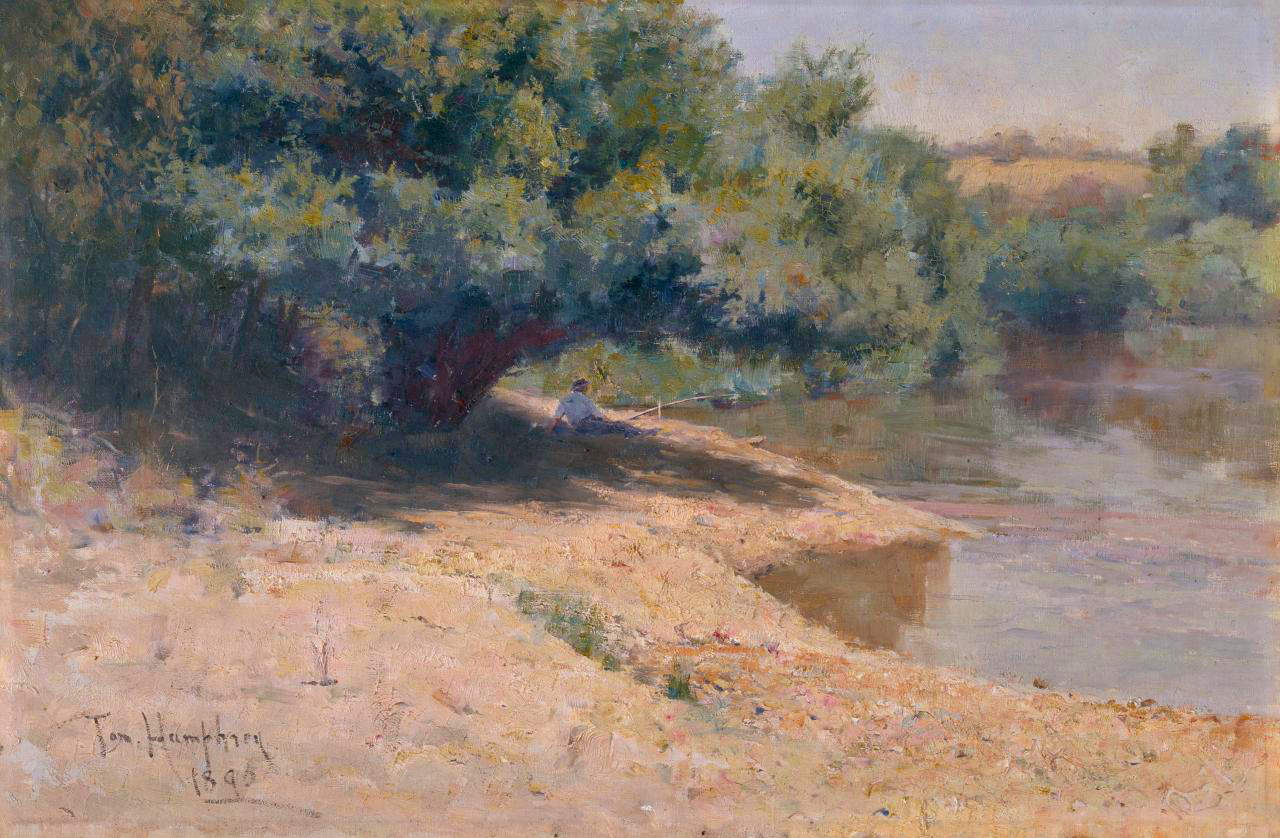
Under a Summer Sun, 1895, National Gallery of Victoria
