= Box Hill South =

- Suburb
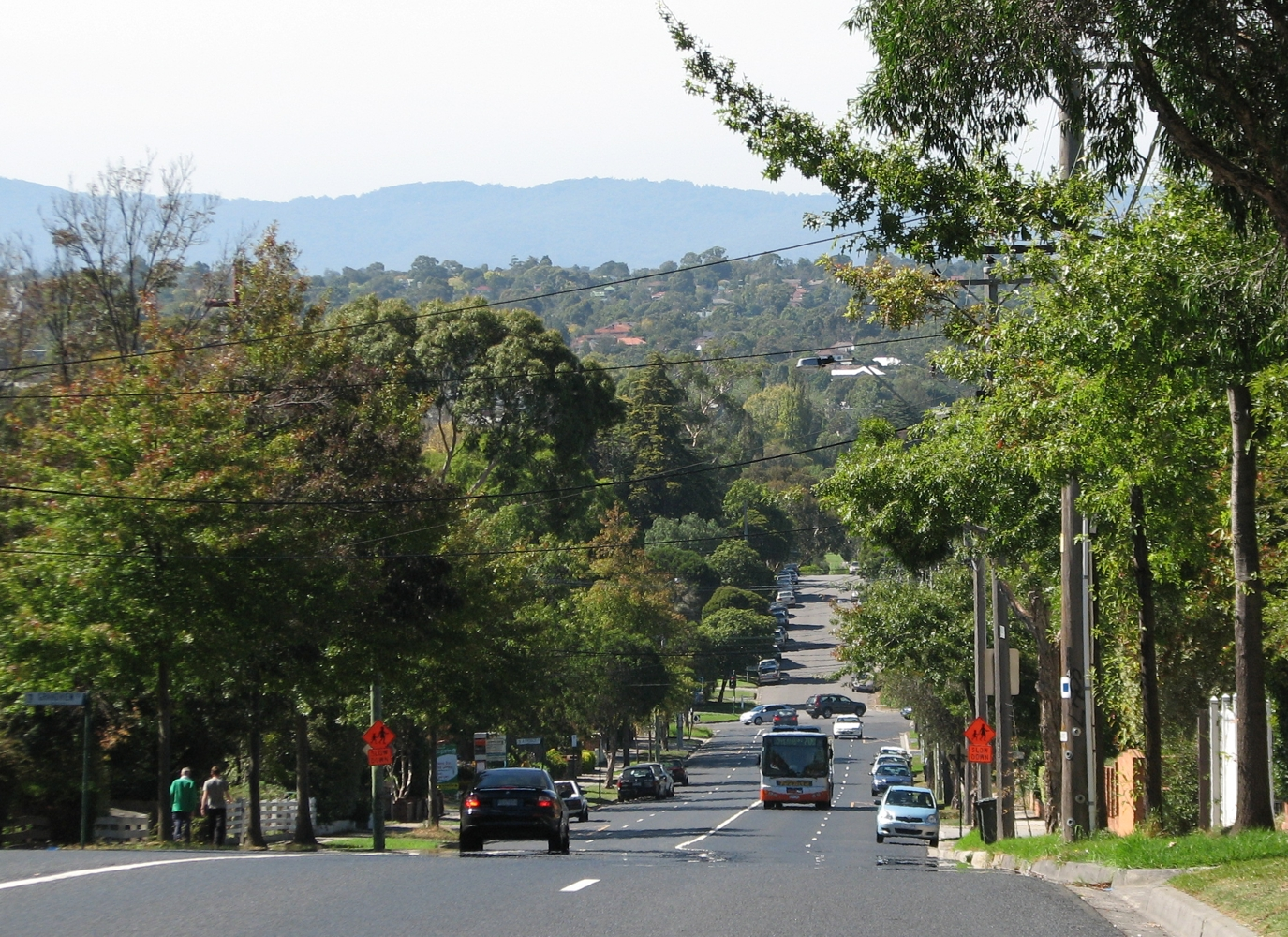
- Riversdale Road

- Interactive map of Box Hill South
- Coordinates: 37.836°S 145.124°E
- Country: Australia
- State: Victoria
- City: Melbourne
- LGA: City of Whitehorse
- Location: 14 km (8.7 mi) from Melbourne

Government
  - State electorate: Box Hill
  - Federal divisions: Chisholm; Menzies

Area
  - Total: 3.5 km^{2} (1.4 sq mi)

Population
  - Total: 8,491 (SAL 2021)
- Postcode: 3128
Suburbs around Box Hill South
| Mont Albert | Box Hill | Blackburn |
| Surrey Hills | Box Hill South | Blackburn South |
| Burwood | Burwood | Burwood East |

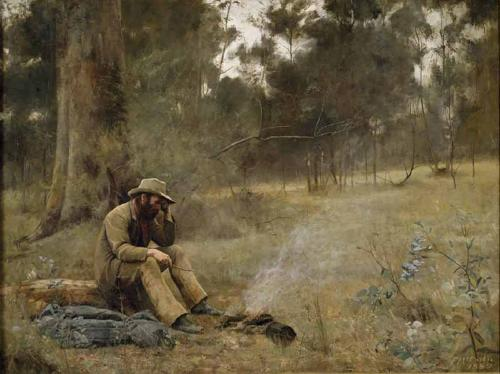
Down on His Luck, by Frederick McCubbin

Box Hill South is a suburb of Melbourne, Victoria, Australia, 14 km east of the Melbourne central business district, located within the City of Whitehorse local government area. Box Hill South recorded a population of 8,491 at the 2021 census.

== History ==
In the summer of 1885/86, Tom Roberts and Frederick McCubbin set up a camp, on a site near Damper Creek (now Gardiners Creek), on the property of David Houston, about a mile south of the Box Hill railway station. In this location, painting activities were carried out on weekends over the next few years. At this time the area was relatively untouched bushland.

Following the end of World War II, extensive suburbanisation of the area occurred, including the development of a Housing Commission estate.

Box Hill South Post Office opened on 19 October 1927, with the Wattle Park Post Office opening on 12 December 1960 and the Houston Post Office, on Middleborough Road, on 16 October 1961.

Heritage places listed in the City of Whitehorse Planning Scheme include Tyneholm, in Elgar Road (built in 1891), Pound House in Canterbury Road, St James Uniting Church in Riversdale Road (currently St Paul's Lutheran Church) and Gwynton Park (built c. 1907), which is now the administration building of Kingswood College in Station Street.

== Geography ==
Box Hill South is bounded to the north by Canterbury Road, to the east by Middleborough Road, to the south by the Burwood campus of Deakin University, Gardiners Creek and Eley Road and to the west by Elgar Road. Gardiners Creek runs diagonally across the suburb from the north-east to the south-west.

In the 12-month period to January 2020 Box Hill South reported a median house price of A$1.02 million for a three bedroom house.

== Education ==
Located on the Station Street south of the intersection with Piedmont Street, Kingswood College, founded in 1890, is a coeducational K–12 school, operated by the Uniting Church. Roberts McCubbin Primary School is located between Birdwood and Haig Streets (east–west), and Devon and Asquith/Foch Streets (north–south). The school site underwent a $6.2 million redevelopment in 2008. A kindergarten, Box Hill South Pre-School, is located in Rotary Court.

== Sport and recreation ==
Wembley Park, on Canterbury Road, is the home of the Box Hill Soccer Club. Box Hill Tennis Club is located on Station Street, as is Box Hill Golf Course. Reserves include the Gardiners Creek Reserve and Artists Park. A shared bicycle and pedestrian trail runs through the Gardiners Creek Valley.

== Shopping ==
There are no major shopping centres in the suburb, but smaller strip shopping centres exist at the intersection of Canterbury Road and Station Street (including the Box Hill South Post Office), the intersection of Elgar Road and Riversdale Road (including the Wattle Park Post Office) and the intersection of Middleborough Road and Mirabella Crescent (including Houston Post Office).

== Transport ==
The principal north–south roads are Elgar Road, Station Street and Middleborough Road, while the principal east–west roads are Canterbury Road and Riversdale Road, the latter terminating at the Box Hill Golf Course. Box Hill South is not served directly by rail, however, the terminus of tram route 70 is located on the suburb's western boundary, at Wattle Park.

The suburb is served by seven bus routes, running down Elgar Road, Station Street, Middleborough Road and Riversdale Road, as well as some side streets.

Buses on Elgar Road;

- 201 - Box Hill station to Deakin University; limited stops
- 281 - Templestowe to Deakin University
- 767 - Box Hill to Westfield Southland

Buses on Station Street;

- 732 - Box Hill to Upper Ferntree Gully station
- SmartBus 903 - Altona station to Mordialloc station (Canterbury Road to Riversdale Road only)

Buses on Middleborough Road;

- 733 - Box Hill to Oakleigh

Buses on Riversdale Road;

- SmartBus 903 - Altona to Mordialloc (Station Street to Elgar Road only)

Buses on various side streets;

- 735 - Box Hill to Nunawading station

== Industrial zone ==
An industrial zone is located in the east, fronting Middleborough Road. The City of Whitehorse operates a council depot in this area. The depot site is also home to the Nunawading Unit of the Victoria State Emergency Service. Crawford Productions were located on the corner of Middleborough Road and Clarice Road from 1982. The buildings were demolished in 2006 and replaced by a Bunnings warehouse.

A tissue factory, currently operated by the Sorbent Paper Company, is located on Ailsa Street, on a 14-hectare (35-acre) site. It was constructed by Bowater Scott in 1960 and was later taken over by Carter Holt Harvey. By 2005, 550 staff were employed at the site. The factory sustained major damage from fires in 1972, 1995, 2002 and 2006.

== Places of worship ==
St Paul’s Lutheran Church currently occupies the site of the former St James Uniting Church, originally known as St James Presbyterian Church, Wattle Park, the original church building designed by architects Chandler & Patrick. The pipe organ was relocated from the Unitarian Church in Melbourne, where it had been originally installed in 1887 by Alfred Fuller and rebuilt by Kilner's Piano Works in 1965. Other churches include St Aidans Anglican Church in Surrey Street and Wattle Park Chapel in Elgar Road, an independent church associated with the Christian Brethren.

== Retirement community ==
Hayville Retirement Community, located on Elgar Road, near the intersection of Canterbury Road, is a retirement community, operated by TriCare. It was formerly operated by the Salvation Army.

== Gallery ==
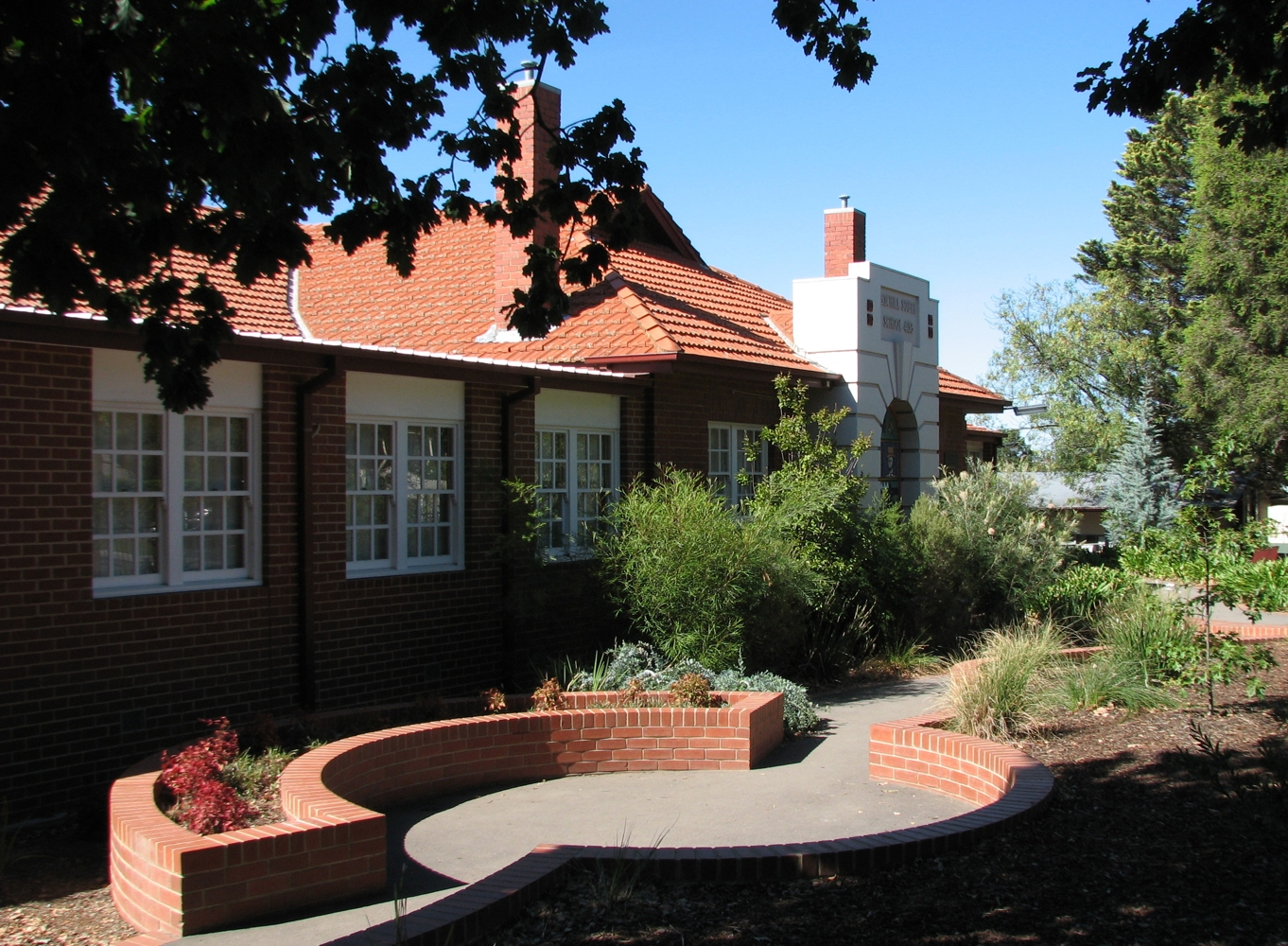
Roberts McCubbin Primary School

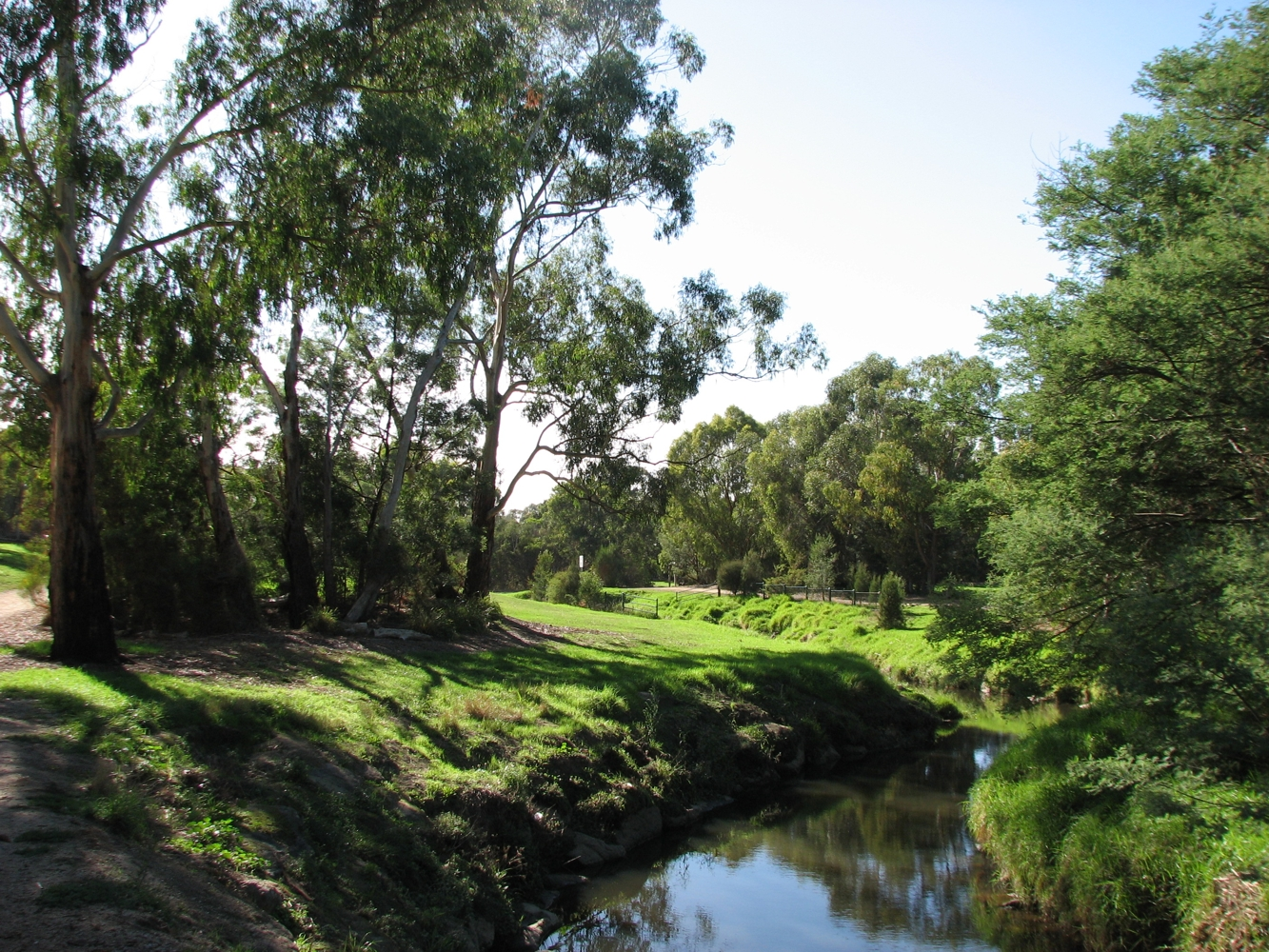
Gardiners Creek Reserve

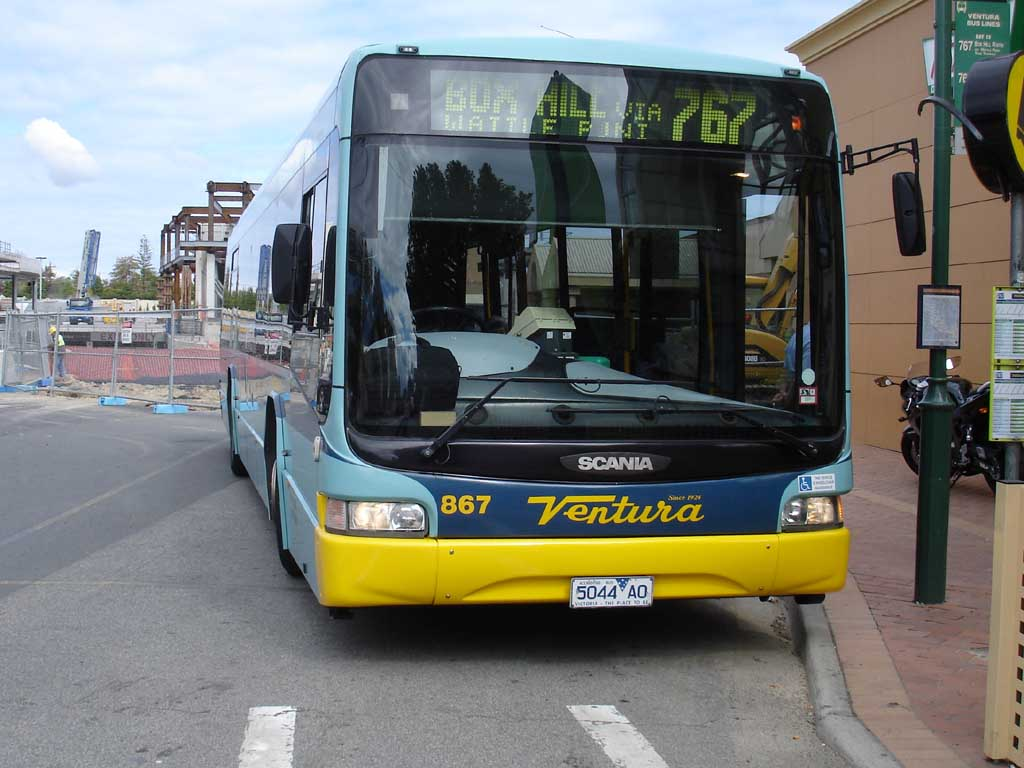
The 767 bus service connects Box Hill South to shopping centres at Box Hill, Chadstone and Southland

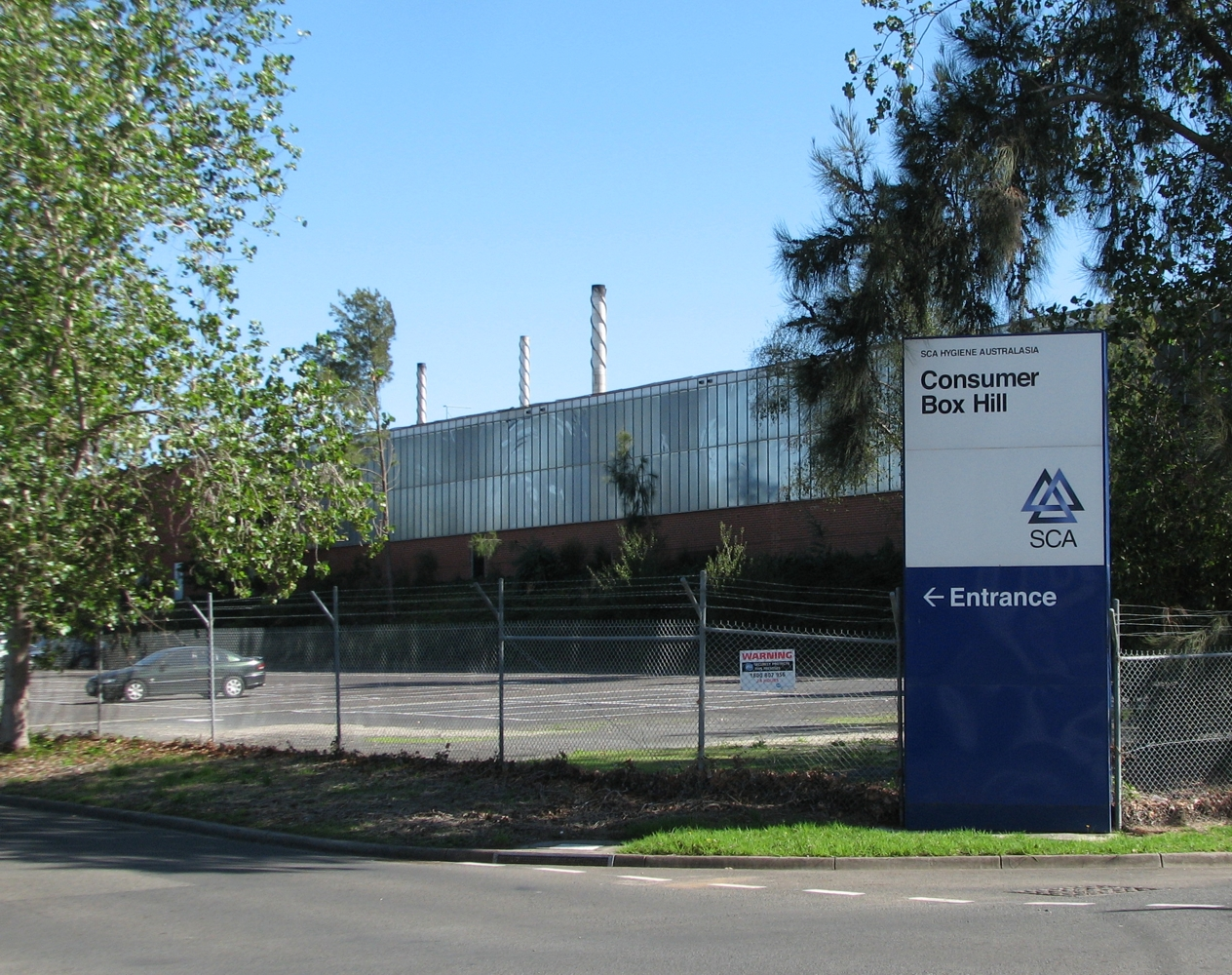
SCA Hygiene

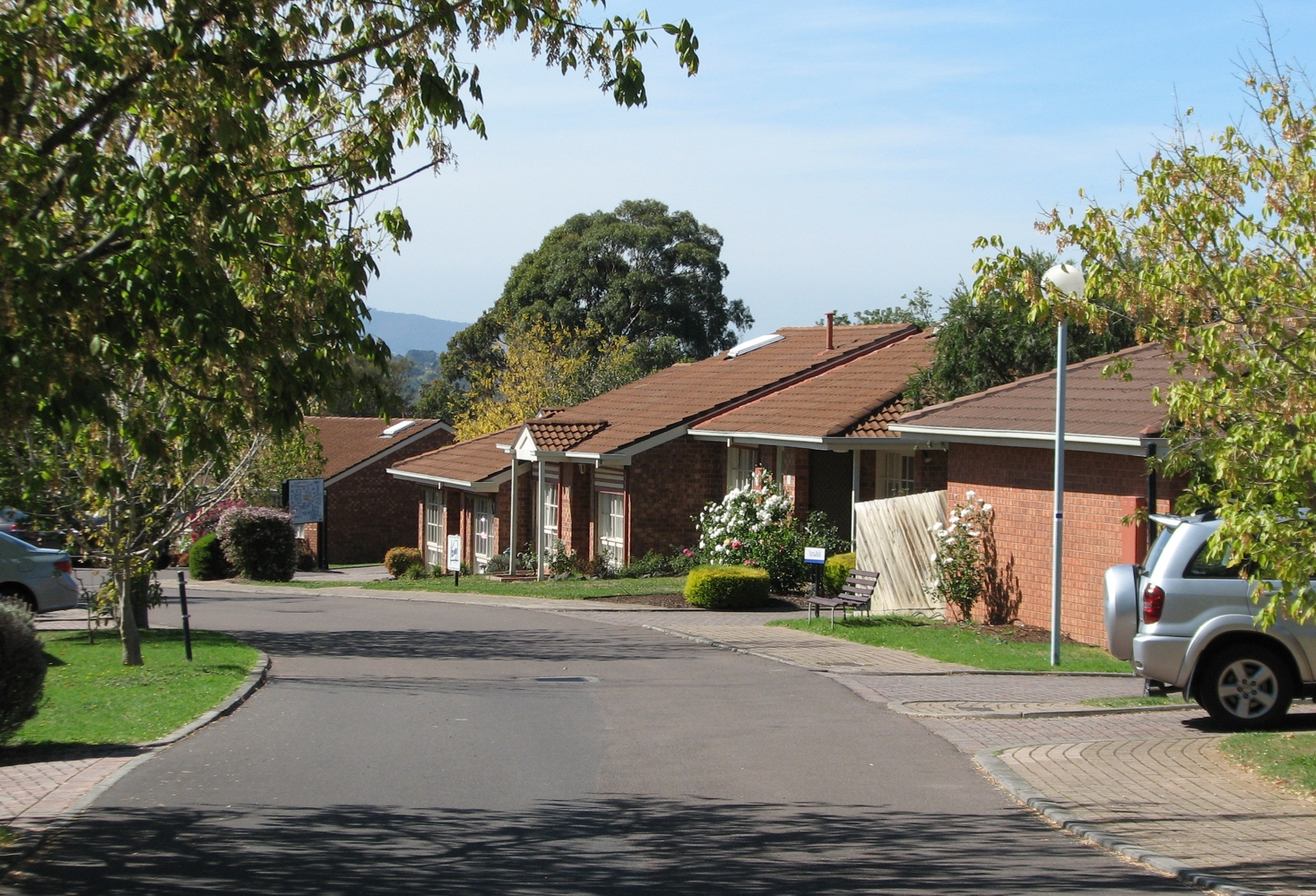
Hayville Retirement Community

== See also ==
- City of Box Hill – Box Hill South was previously within this former local government area.
