= William Lane Milligan =

British military surgeon (1795–1851)

William Milligan
- Born: 1 February 1795; Cavan, Ireland
- Died: 2 September 1851 (aged 56); London, England
- Occupation: Military surgeon
- Title: Dr
- Spouse: Elizabeth Sybil Lane (m. 1823)
- Children: 3

William Lane Milligan (1795–1851) was a British military surgeon. He became an early resident of the Swan River Colony in Western Australia.

== Early life ==
Milligan was born on 1 February 1795 in Cavan, Ireland. He received a Licentiate of Midwifery and a Doctor of Medicine from the University of Edinburgh.

== Career ==
He was a Fellow of the Royal College of Physicians of London and served as a military surgeon. He originally joined the 16th Regiment of the British Army, but he transferred to the 63rd Regiment on 8 February 1827.

Some records claim that Milligan emigrated to Western Australia with his wife on James Stirling's expedition arriving aboard HMS Sulphur on 8 June 1829. Others claim that he emigrated to Western Australia with his wife, child and a nephew, arriving aboard Wanstead on 30 January 1830.

The painting "The Foundation of Perth 1829" shows Milligan as being present at the foundation of Perth on 12 August 1829. However, if he only arrived in Perth on 30 January 1830, more than five months after the foundation ceremony, he cannot have been present.

Milligan opened the first hospital in the colony in June 1830 and served as its superintendent.

He was the original owner of the land at the southern end of Milligan Street, Perth, which was named after him. He moved to Fremantle in 1834, but was then transferred to India and left on Merope on 18 April 1834. He was Staff Surgeon at Poonamallee, near Madras (Chennai) in 1837.

In 1837 Milligan published a paper in the Madras Journal of Literature and Science titled "Some Account of the New Colony of Western Australia".

Milligan retired from the army in 1847 due to ill health, and lived in Nuneaton, England.

== Personal life ==
He married Elizabeth Sybil Lane in 1823. They had four children: Anna, William, Harriet, Maria. The last three were born in the colony; William lived only four days.

== Death ==
He died on 2 September 1851 in London, England.
