= Louis Abrahams (art patron) =

British-born Australian tobacconist, art patron, painter and etcher

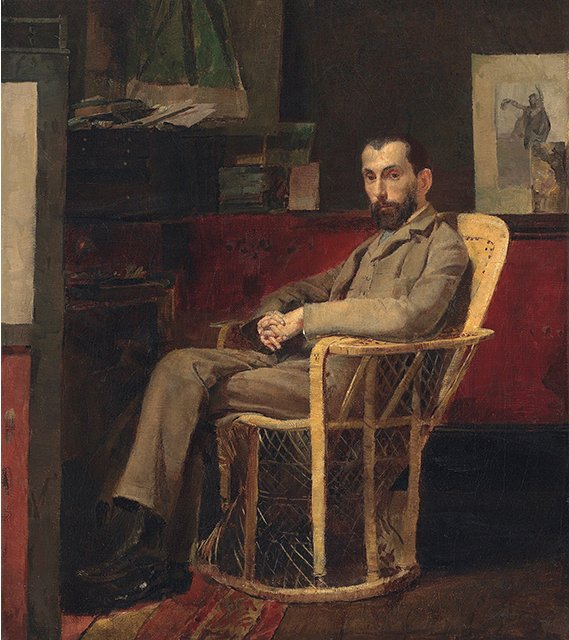
- Portrait of Abrahams by Tom Roberts, 1886, National Gallery of Australia
- Born: Louis Abrahams; 1852; London, England
- Died: 1903 (aged 50–51); Melbourne, Victoria, Australia
- Known for: Painting
- Movement: Heidelberg School
- Spouse: Golda Abrahams

Louis Abrahams (1852 – 2 December 1903) was a British-born Australian tobacconist, art patron, painter and etcher associated with the Heidelberg School art movement, also known as Australian Impressionism.

== Early life ==
Born in London, England, Abrahams arrived in Melbourne, Victoria, Australia, as an eight-year-old with his family in 1860.

== Career and association with the Heidelberg School ==
Later that decade, Abrahams attended the Artisans School of Design in Carlton, where he met Frederick McCubbin. The pair formed a close friendship and later enrolled at the National Gallery of Victoria Art School in 1871, where they founded a club to study the nude. McCubbin named his first son Louis after Abrahams, who reciprocated by naming his son Frederick. Both artists, along with fellow National Gallery student Tom Roberts, established the Box Hill artists' camp in 1885. Later accompanied by Arthur Streeton, Charles Conder and others, the group sought to capture the Australian bush by painting it en plein air.

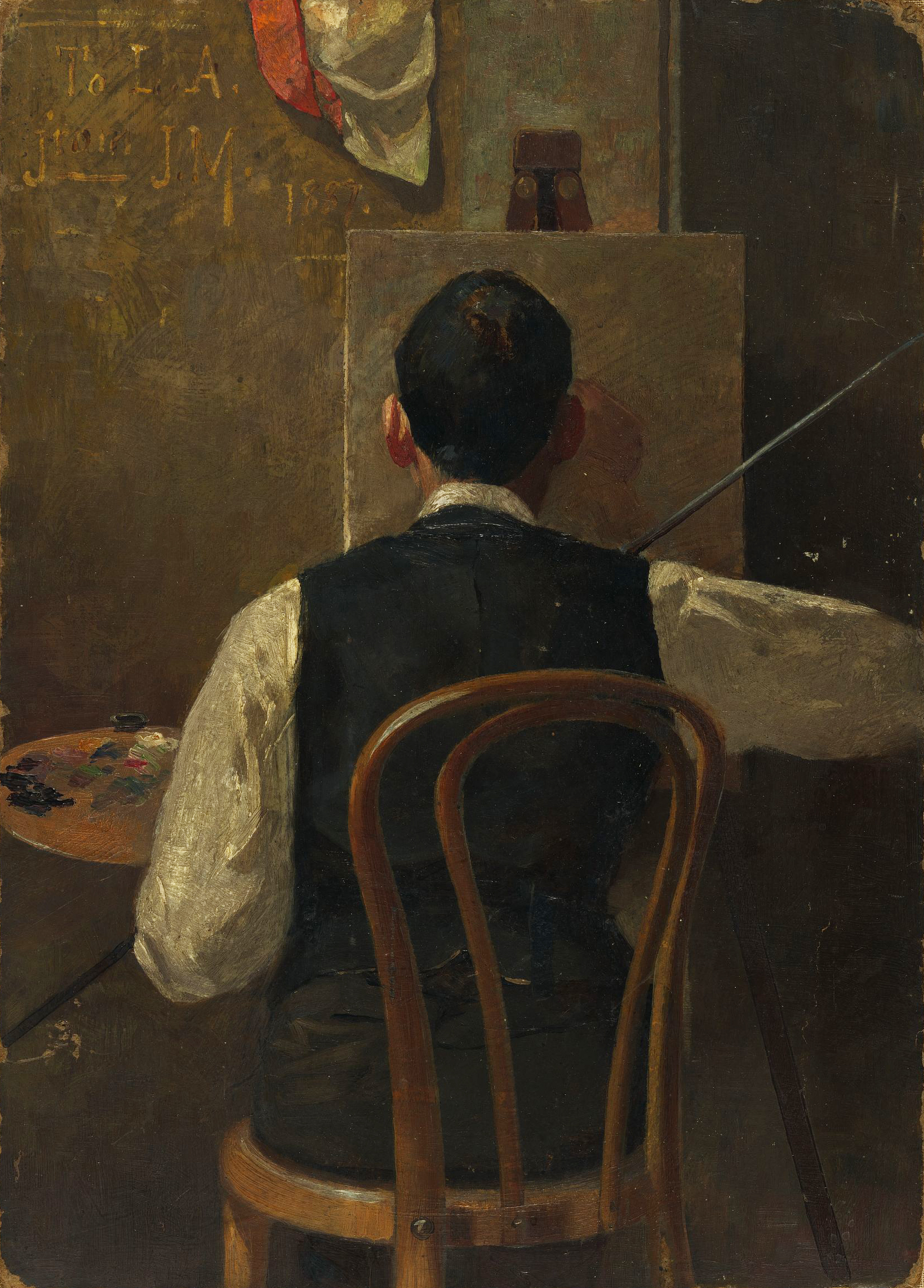
The artist (Louis Abrahams) at his easel 1887 by John Mather

By the time the group relocated to Mount Eagle estate (Eaglemont) near Heidelberg in 1888, Abrahams had less time for art due to the demands of the family cigar business, Sniders & Abrahams. He still made trips to visit his friends at Eaglemont, and supplied them with many cigar-box lids for painting impressions. 183 of these cigar-box paintings were exhibited by Roberts, Streeton, Conder and McCubbin in the landmark 9 by 5 Impression Exhibition of 1889.

Abrahams sat for some of McCubbin's best-known paintings, including Down on His Luck (1889) and A Bush Burial (1890), and he is the subject of portraits by McCubbin, Roberts, Streeton, Julian Ashton, John Mather and others. Due to his financial support of the Australian impressionists, Abrahams, along with his brother and business partner Lawrence, is regarded as an important patron of early Australian art.

Louis Abrahams 1886 etching of an 1880 Australian pastoral landscape by John Mather. Exhibited at the 1886 First Annual Exhibition of the Australian Artists' Association. (Note: Etching, after J. Mather by L. Abrahams is the first etching exhibited in an art society's exhibition in Australia. The etching is listed in the catalogue of the First Annual Exhibition of the Australian Artists' Association held in September 1886 at the Buxton Gallery. The etching illustrates an 1880 painting by John Mather. Abrahams also exhibited a painting titled Maggie Mather, John Mather's daughter, in the 1887 Winter Exhibition of the Australian Artists' Association. The painting and etching provide further insights into the professional and personal relationships between the artists that formed Australian Artists' Association.)

== Death and legacy ==
Abrahams suffered from depression and committed suicide on 2 December 1903. His body was found in a basement toilet at his factory, "with a bullet wound in the head and a revolver clenched in both hands".

Abrahams' personal art collection was passed down to his grandson, architect Sir Denys Lasdun, best-known for designing the Royal National Theatre complex on London's South Bank.

Abrahams Crescent in the Canberra suburb of Conder is named in his honour.

Abrahams's nephew was Louis Henry Abrahams (1891 – 1940), son of Abrahams's brother Lawrence, and a founder of Astor Radio.

== Gallery ==
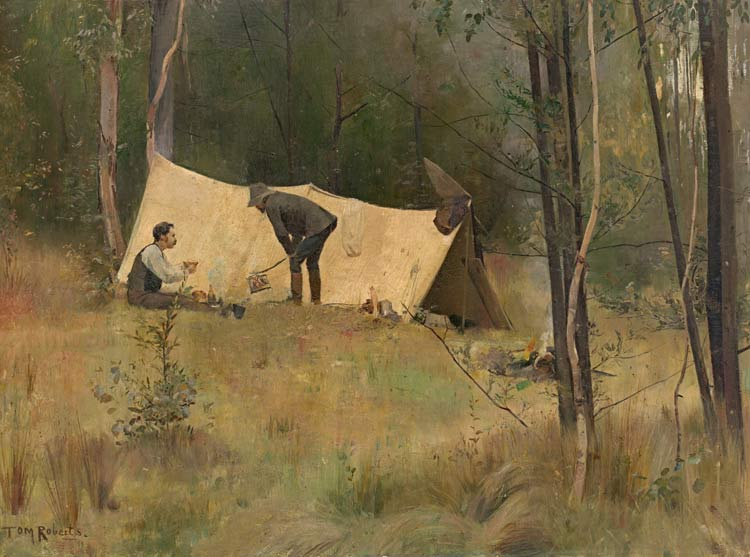
Roberts' 1886 painting The Artists' Camp shows Abrahams and McCubbin

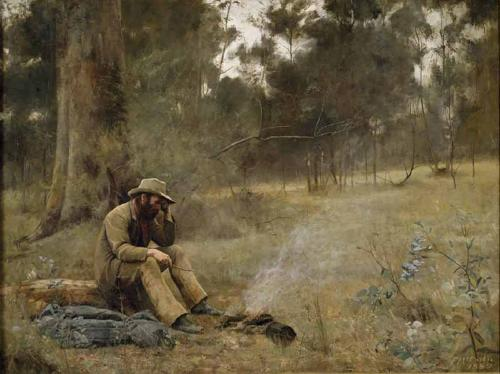
Abrahams sat as the disheartened swagman for McCubbin's 1889 painting Down on His Luck

== Notes and references ==
Notes
