= Box Hill artists' camp =

Artists' camp in Box Hill, Victoria, Australia

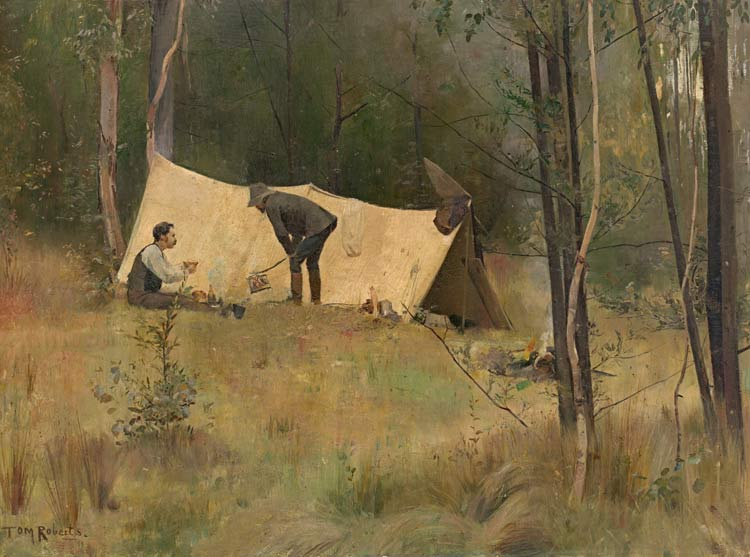
Tom Roberts, The Artists' Camp, 1886, National Gallery of Victoria

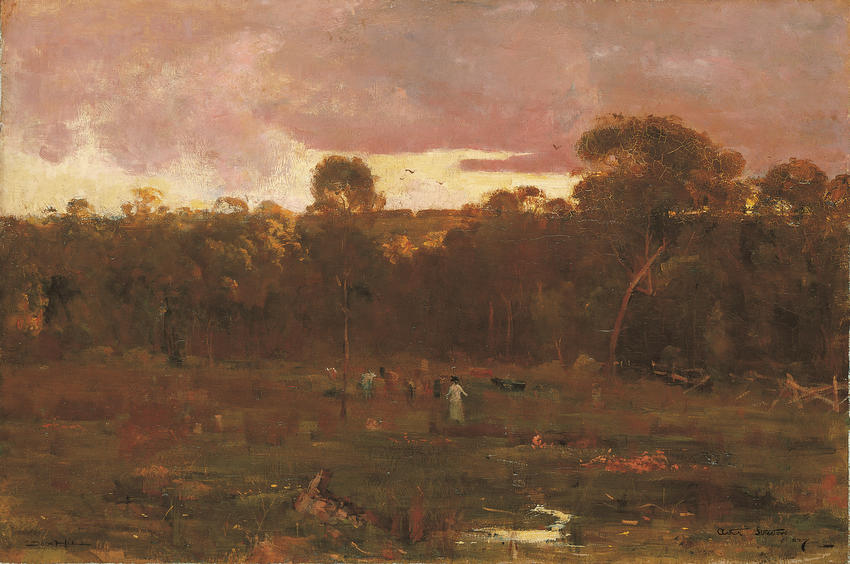
Arthur Streeton, June evening, Box Hill, 1887, Queensland Art Gallery

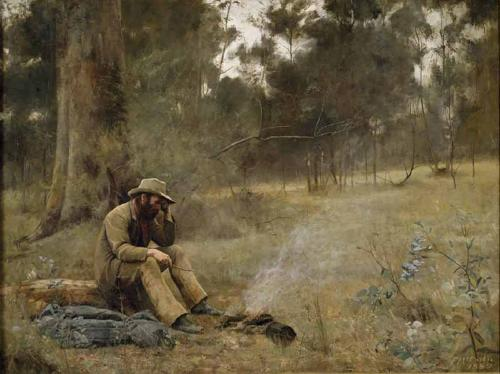
Frederick McCubbin, Down on His Luck, 1889, Art Gallery of Western Australia

The Box Hill artists' camp was a site in Box Hill, Victoria, Australia favoured by a group of plein air painters in the mid to late 1880s who later became associated with the Heidelberg School art movement, named after Heidelberg, the site of another of their camps.

The Box Hill area was then on the outskirts of Melbourne and largely undeveloped, allowing artists convenient access to the Australian bush, as the Box Hill railway station had been completed only a few years prior. Tom Roberts, Frederick McCubbin and Arthur Streeton were among those who often stayed at the camp. Due to Box Hill's status as the first of these artists' plein air camps, a number of scholars have suggested that "Box Hill School" is a more appropriate name for the Heidelberg School movement.

== History ==
In the summer of 1885–86, plein air painters Tom Roberts, Frederick McCubbin and Louis Abrahams set up a tent near Damper Creek (now Gardiners Creek) on the property of David Houston, in the Box Hill area east of Melbourne. They were attracted to Box Hill due to its rural scenery and tracts of untouched bushland while also being easily accessible from the city, the Box Hill railway station having opened three years prior.

Painting activities were carried out on weekends by the trio over the next few years and at various times other artists joined them, including Arthur Streeton, Charles Conder, Jane Sutherland, Tom Humphrey, John Llewellyn Jones and John Mather. By 1889, these artists had moved on from Box Hill and founded other camps around Melbourne, most notably at Heidelberg.

Notable works painted in and around the Box Hill camp include:

- The artists' camp (Roberts, 1886)
- A summer morning tiff (Roberts, 1886)
- Lost (McCubbin, 1886)
- Gathering mistletoe (McCubbin, 1886]
- Charcoal burners / Wood Splitters (Tom Roberts, 1886)
- Obstruction (Sutherland, 1887)
- Reconciliation (Roberts, 1887)
- Settler's Camp (Streeton, 1888)
- Pastoral (Streeton, 1888)
- The way to school (Humphrey, 1888)
- Orchard at Box Hill (Conder, 1888)
- Down on His Luck (McCubbin 1889)
- Mayflies in Springtime (Tollins, 1889)

== Legacy ==
The artists remembered the Box Hill era with great fondness and nostalgia. In old age, Roberts recalled:

Happy Box Hill – the barked roof of the old people, Houstens [sic] – the land sylvan as it ever was – tea-tree along the creek – young blue gum-twigs – the ‘good night’ of the jackies as the soft darkness fell – then talks round the fire, the ‘Prof’ [McCubbin] philosophic – we forgot everything, but the peace of it.

The site is located within the now suburbanised area of Box Hill South and is commemorated by a cairn in Artists Park off Prince Street. Other local tributes to the camp include the Roberts McCubbin Primary School and the Whitehorse Artists' Trail. Box Hill Town Hall is home to the City of Whitehorse Art Collection, which includes Box Hill works by McCubbin, Roberts and Streeton.

== Gallery ==
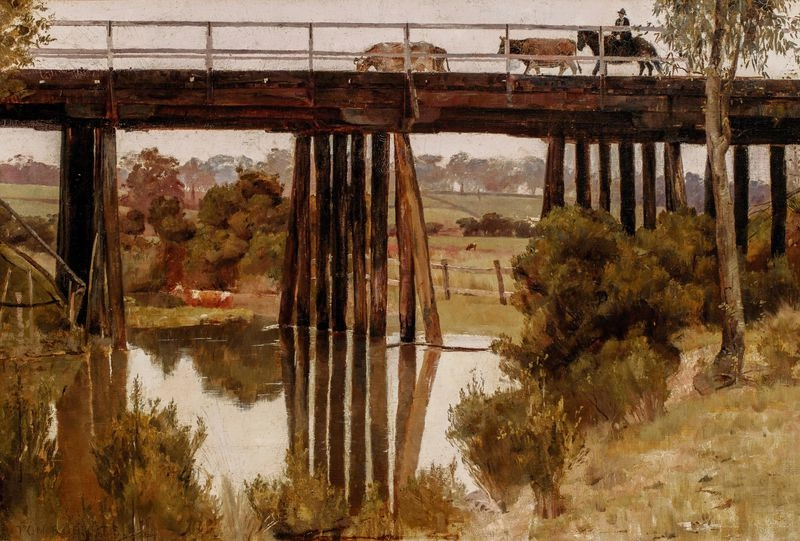
Tom Roberts, Winter morning after rain, Gardiner's Creek, 1885, Art Gallery of South Australia

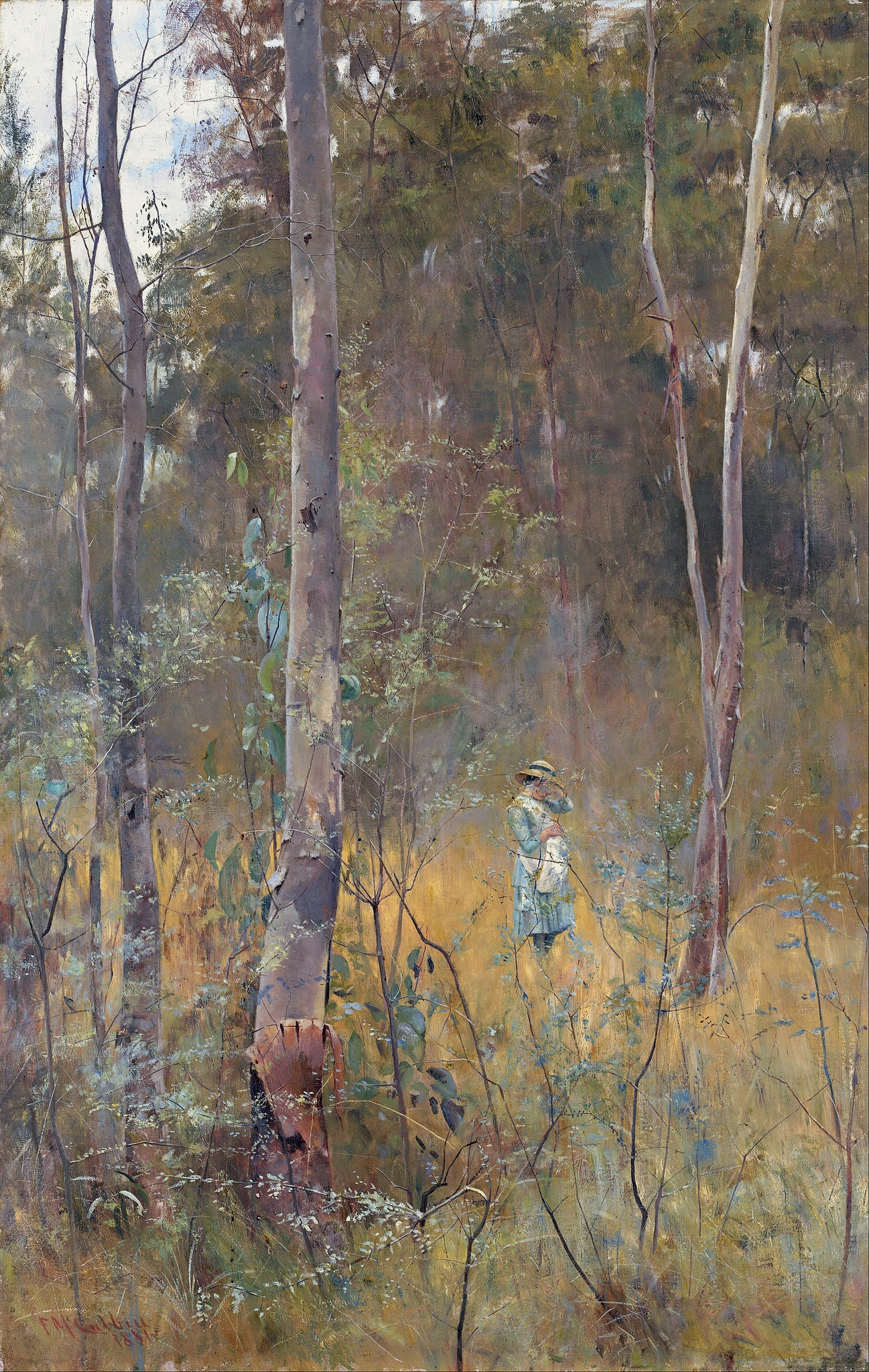
Frederick McCubbin, Lost, 1886, National Gallery of Victoria

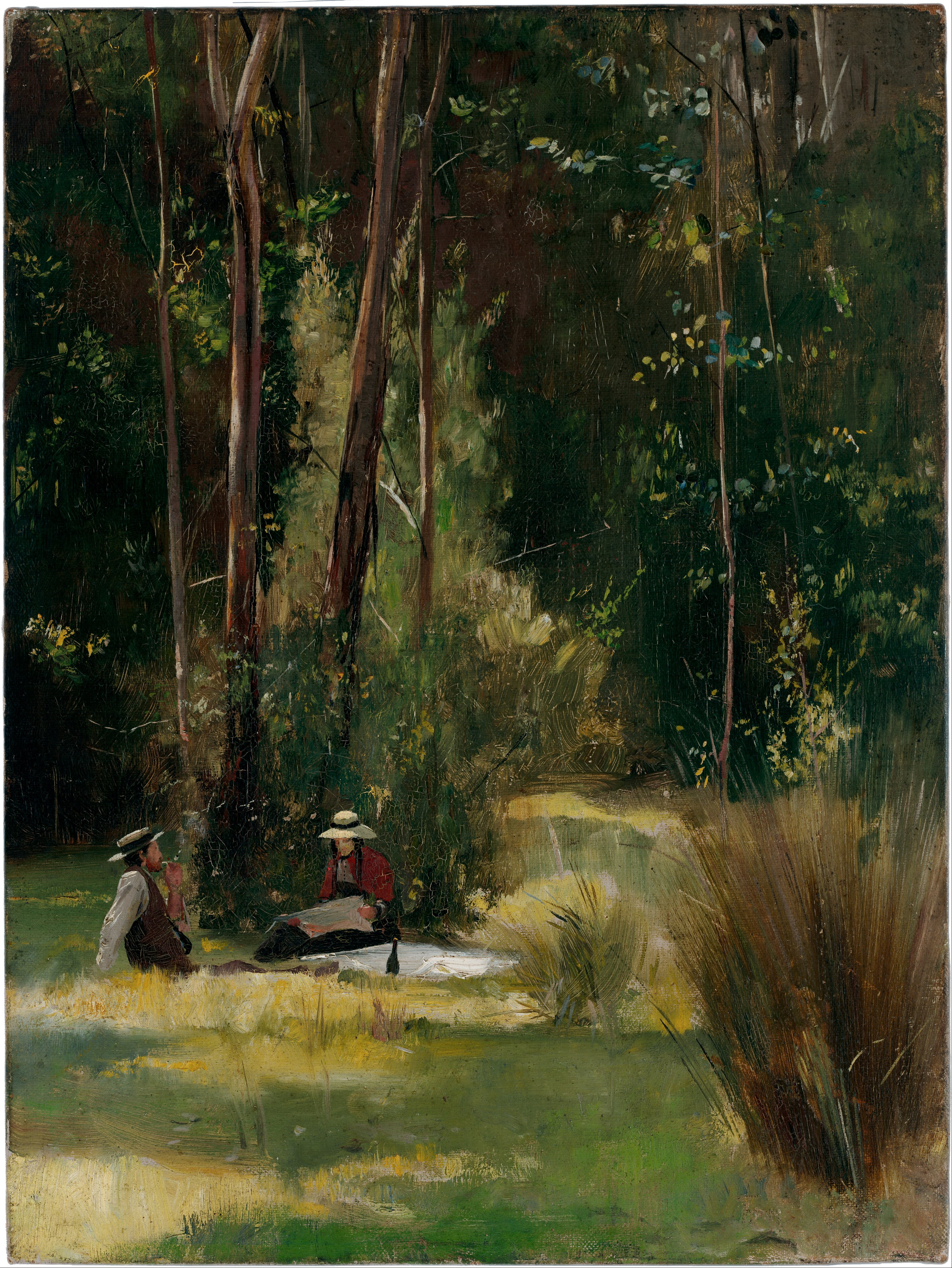
Tom Roberts, A Sunday Afternoon, 1886, National Gallery of Australia

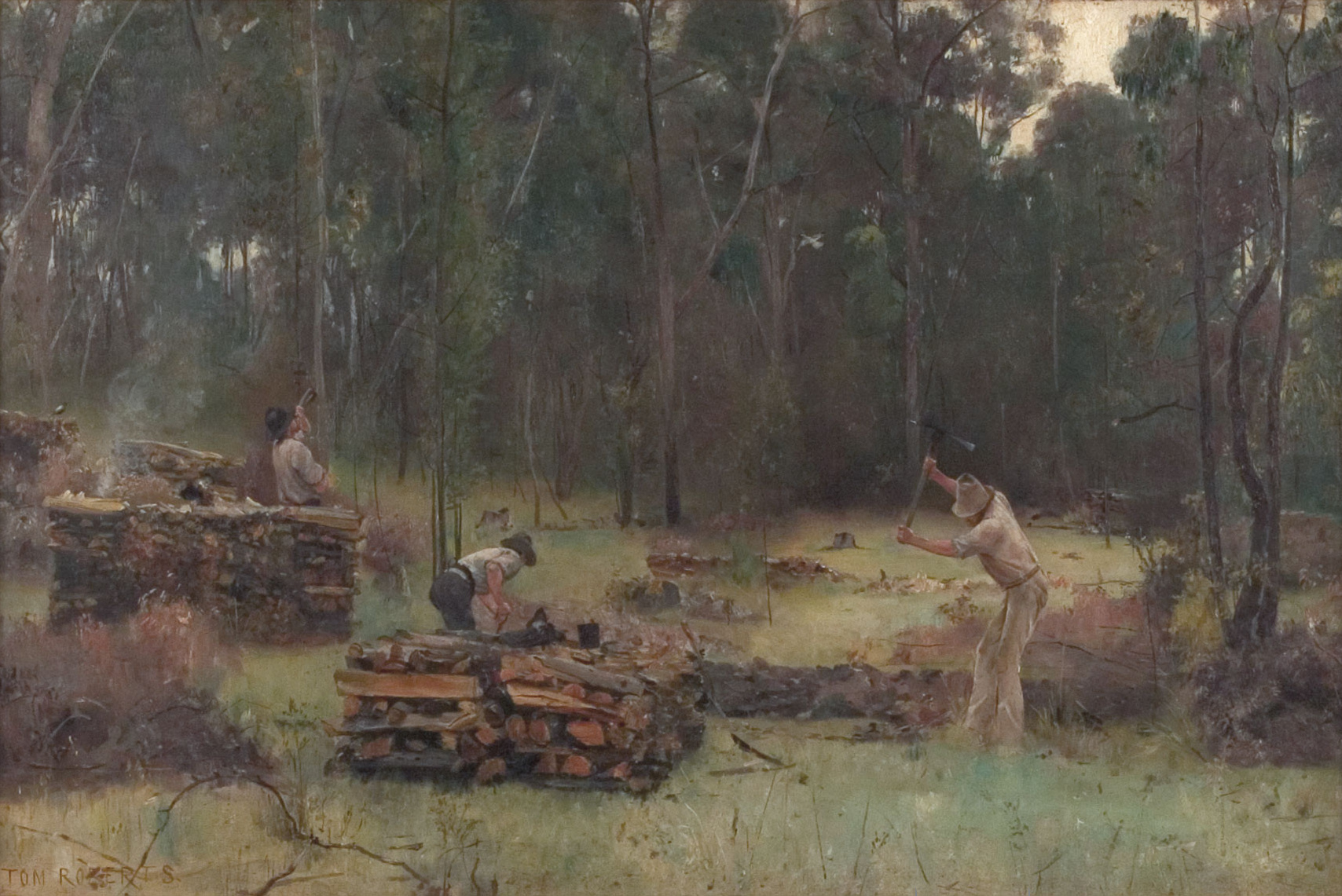
Tom Roberts, Charcoal burners, 1886, Art Gallery of Ballarat

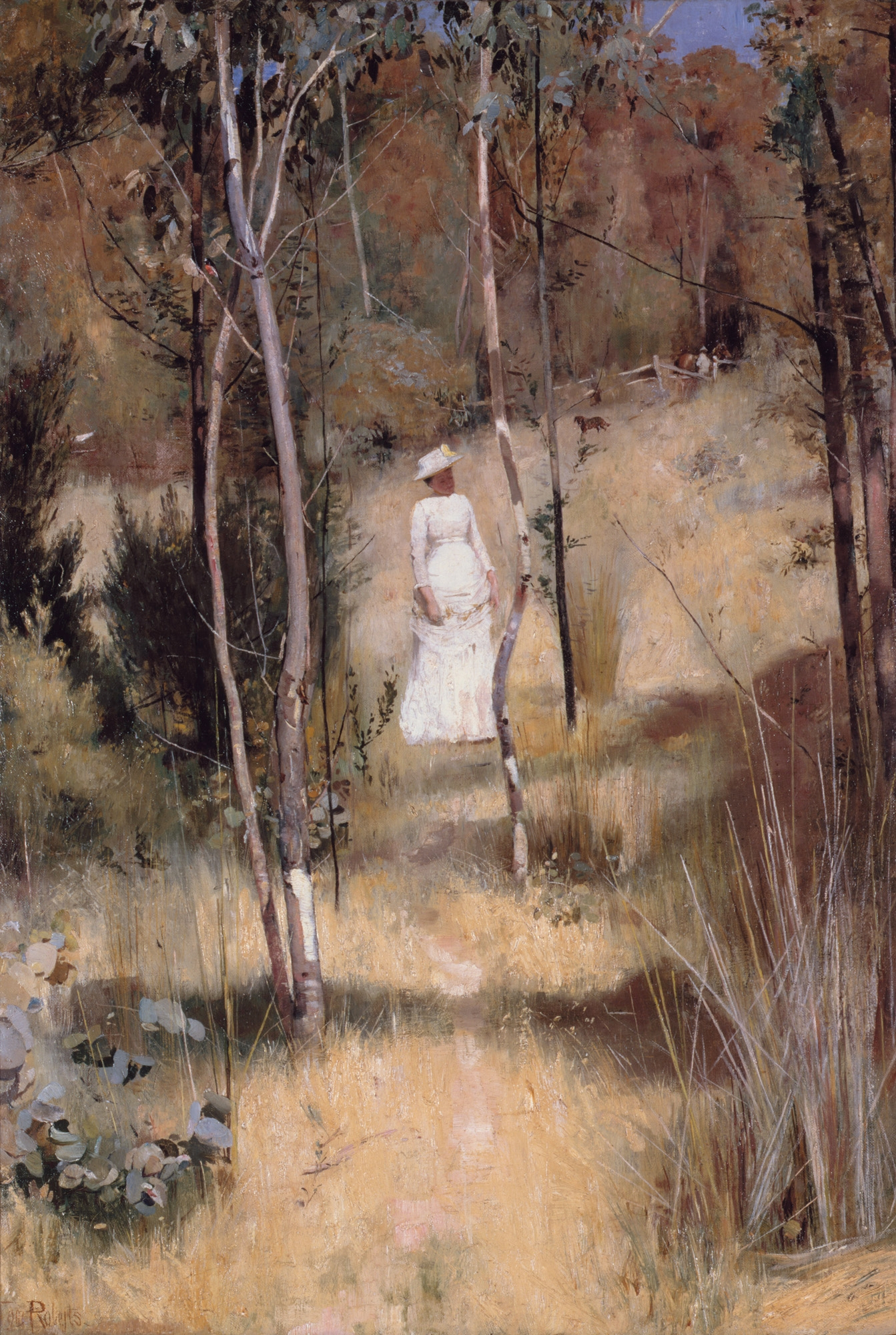
Tom Roberts, A Summer Morning Tiff, 1886, Art Gallery of Ballarat

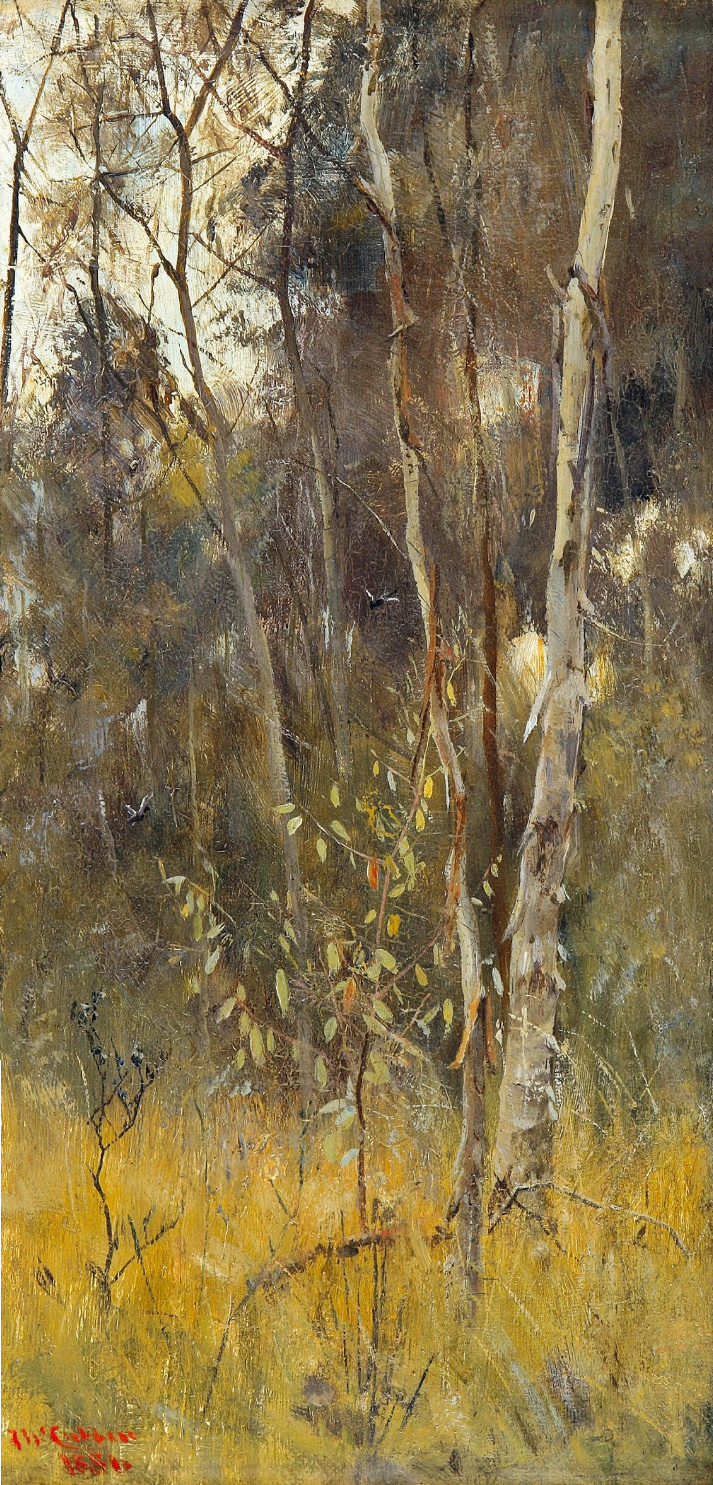
Frederick McCubbin, At the Falling of the Year, 1886, private collection

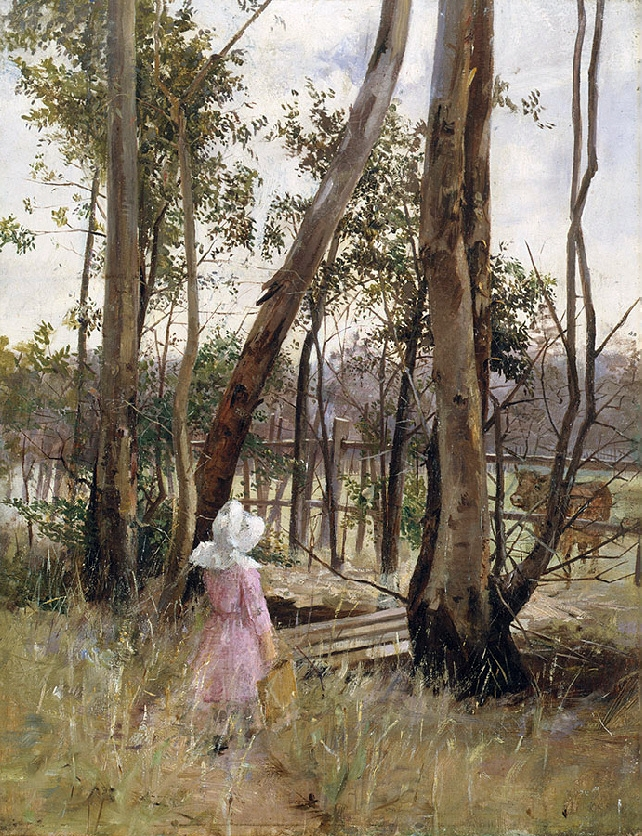
Jane Sutherland, Obstruction, Box Hill, 1887, Art Gallery of Ballarat

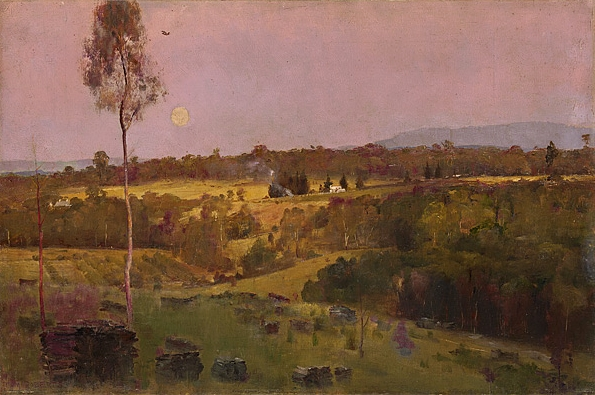
Tom Roberts, Evening, when the quiet east flushes faintly at the sun's last look, 1887, National Gallery of Victoria

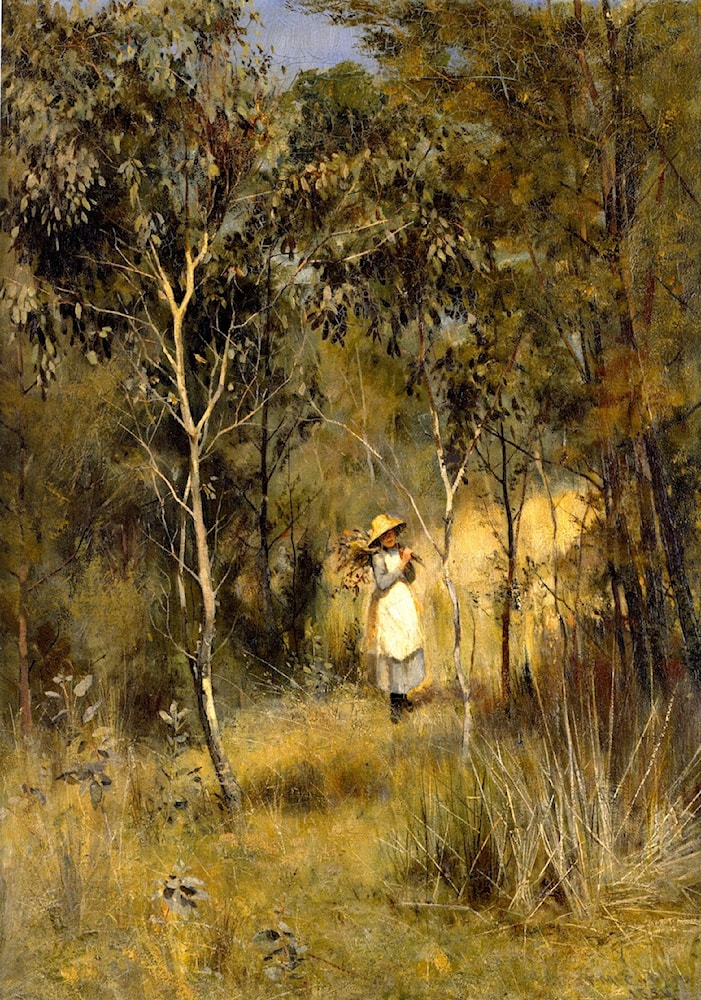
Frederick McCubbin, Gathering Mistletoe, 1886, private collection

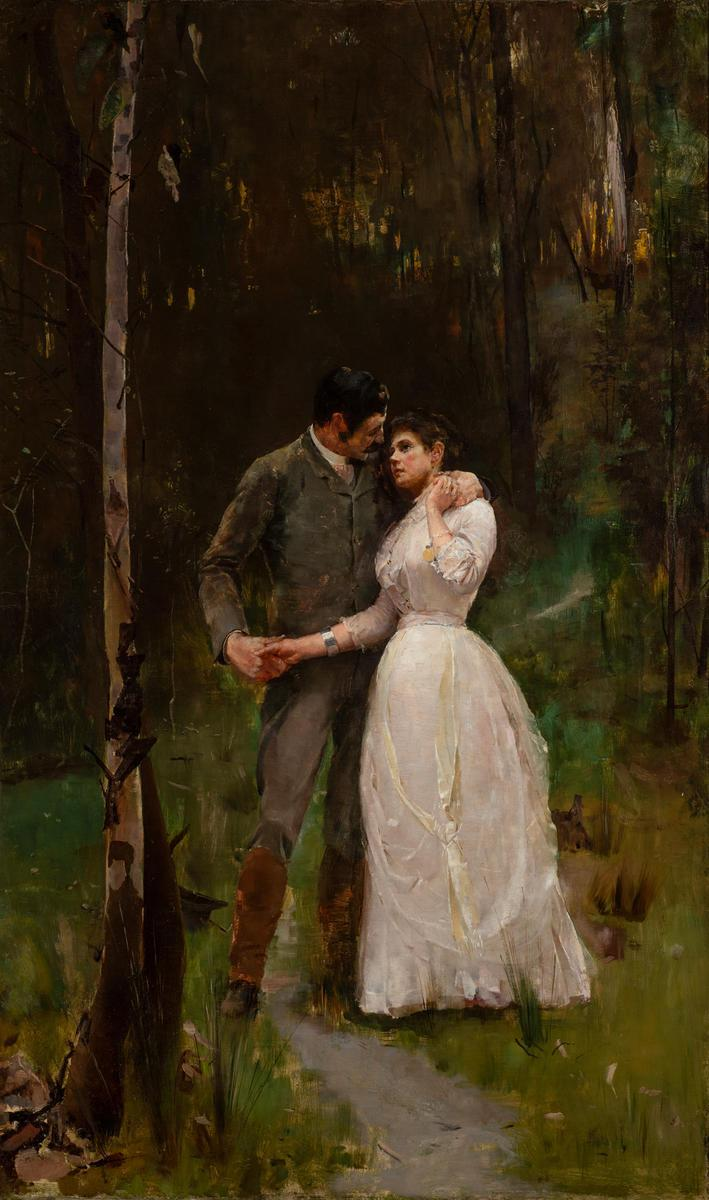
Tom Roberts, Reconciliation, 1887, Castlemaine Art Muuseum

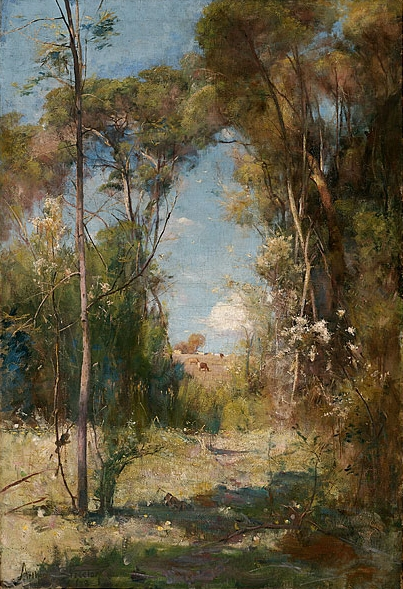
Arthur Streeton, Pastoral, 1888, National Gallery of Australia

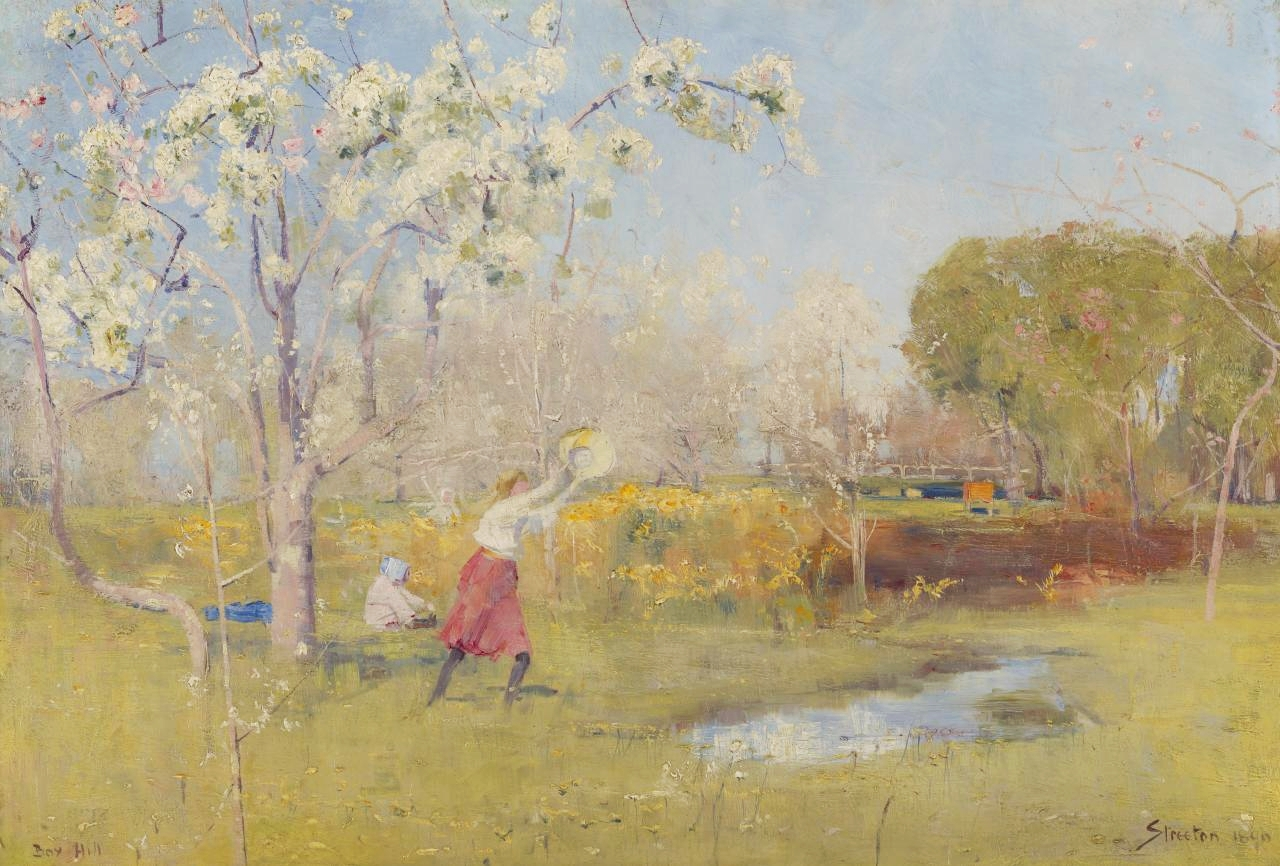
Arthur Streeton, Butterflies and blossoms, 1888, National Gallery of Victoria

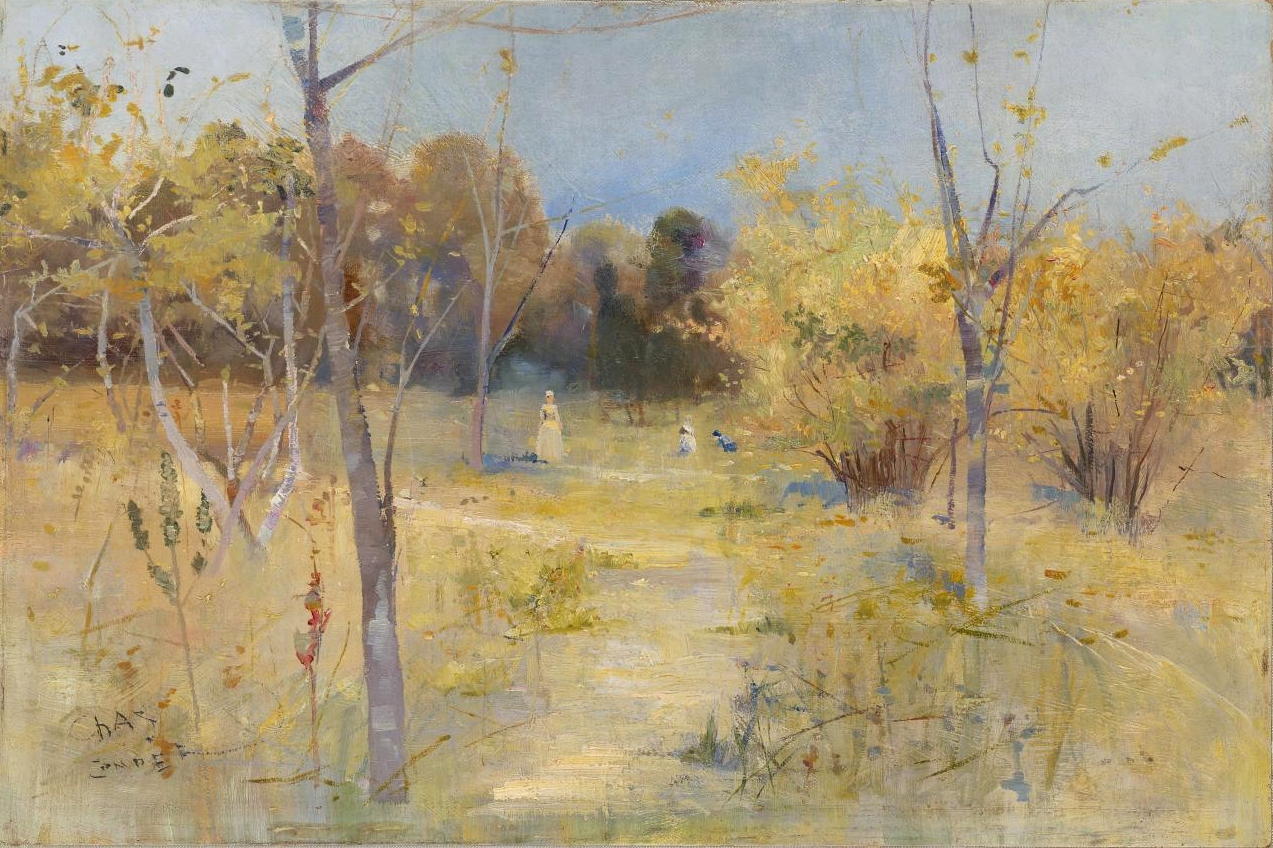
Charles Conder, Orchard at Box Hill, 1888, National Gallery of Victoria

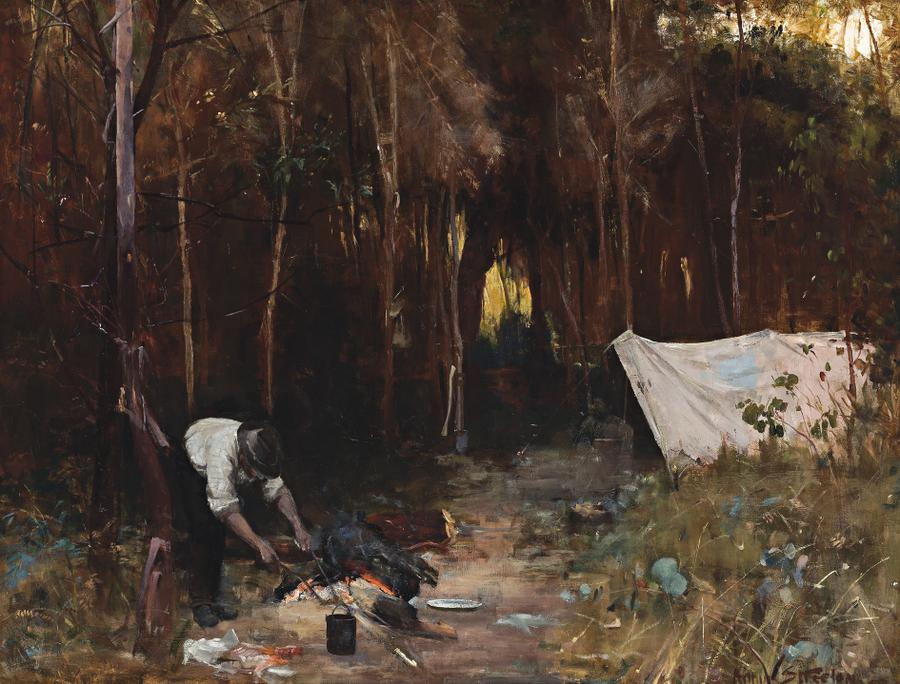
Arthur Streeton, Settler's Camp, 1888, private collection

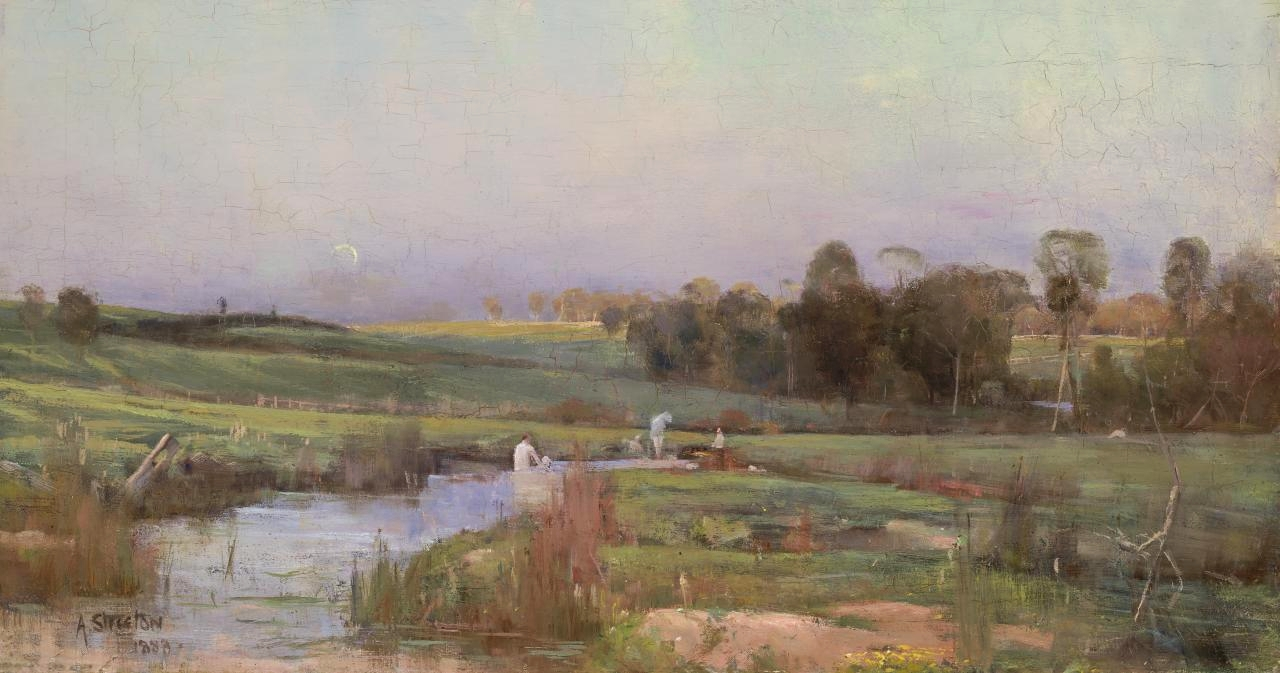
Arthur Streeton, Evening with bathers, 1888, National Gallery of Victoria

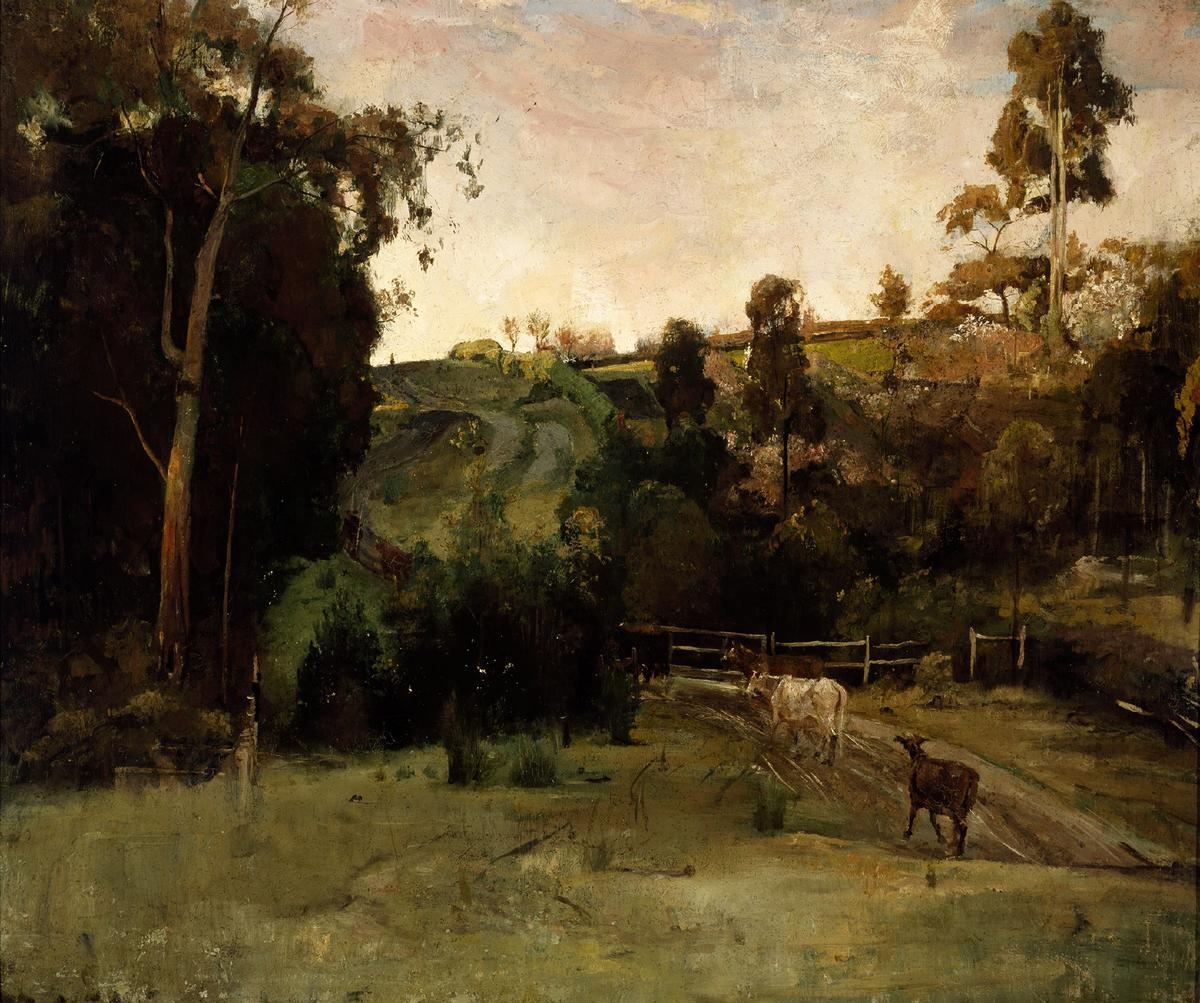
Tom Roberts, Dewy Eve, 1888, Art Gallery of Western Australia

== See also ==
- Art of Australia
- Heidelberg School
- Montsalvat
- One Summer Again, 1985 docudrama
- Heide Circle
