= Louis McCubbin =

Louis Frederick McCubbin (18 March 1890 – 6 December 1952), only ever known as "Louis McCubbin", was an Australian war artist, landscape painter and art gallery director.

== History ==
McCubbin was born in Auburn, Victoria, the eldest son of Annie and Frederick McCubbin, who named him Louis as a tribute to his friend and patron Louis Abrahams.

He was educated privately and studied at the National Gallery of Victoria Art School 1906–1911.

He enlisted for service in the AIF in May 1916, and in May 1918, while a private serving in France, was attached to the War Records Section as an AIF war artist and promoted to lieutenant. He was appointed lieutenant, 3rd Military District, in 1920. He painted backgrounds for the battle scene dioramas (some dioramas had figures sculpted by C. Web Gilbert, others by W. Leslie Bowles) for the Australian War Memorial, Canberra, a task that took nine years to complete.

In the 1930s he shared, with Will Rowell, a roomy studio in Grosvenor Chambers on Collins Street, a building with a long history of artist tenants.

He made a series of paintings depicting the Great Barrier Reef for the Australian National Travel Association.

He taught drawing at Swinburne Technical College in 1935, then in 1936 was appointed director of the Art Gallery of South Australia in Adelaide, and became a member of the Commonwealth Art Advisory Board, along with directors of the Melbourne and Sydney galleries, plus G. V. F. Mann, Will Ashton and Harold Herbert. He served during World War II as deputy director of camouflage for South Australia. He resigned the Adelaide post in 1950 due to poor health. His influence on that gallery was recognised as highly beneficial.

His last years were spent at the home of a relative, Hugh McCubbin, of Punt Road, South Yarra. He died at the Royal Melbourne Hospital and his remains cremated at the Spring Vale Crematorium.

== Personal ==
McCubbin married Stella Elsie Mary Jackson (died 1939), née Abraham, widow of Eric Speers Jackson, on 27 April 1936. They had no children. McCubbin was uncle to Charles McCubbin (born 1930), painter and naturalist, who crossed the Simpson Desert with Warren Bonython in July–August 1973, and was author of Butterflies of Australia, pub. 1971.

== Memberships and recognition ==
- He won the 1917 A.N.A. Landscape prize for his "The Hanover Mire".
- Member Art Committee of the Australian War Memorial
- President of Victorian Art Society 1933–1935
- Member of the Commonwealth Art Advisory Board
- He was awarded the OBE in the New Year's Honours list of 1947.

Examples of his work are held by all State and many Regional galleries.
