= Kingswood College (Box Hill) =

Location
- 355 Station Street; Box Hill South, Victoria 3128; Australia
- 37°49′57″S 145°7′14″E

Information
- Type: private, co-education, independent
- Motto: Embolden Hearts & Inspire Minds
- Denomination: Association with the Uniting Church
- Established: 1890
- Principal: Chrissy Gamble
- Years offered: 3 Year Old Kinder to Year 12
- Gender: Co-educational
- Enrolment: ~700 (K–12)
- Colours: Navy, light blue and yellow
- Slogan: Embolden Hearts & Inspire Minds
- Affiliation: Eastern Independent Schools of Melbourne
- Website: https://www.kingswoodcollege.vic.edu.au/

Kingswood College is a coeducational K–12 college located in the eastern Melbourne suburb of Box Hill South, Victoria, Australia. It began as New College in 1890, and was known as Box Hill Grammar from 1928 to 1965. Among other associations, it operates in association with the Uniting Church in Australia but is not governed or managed by the Church.

== History ==
In 1890, Arthur Stephenson established New College, in Rose Street Box Hill, as a boys' school for day students and boarders. The school was renamed Box Hill Grammar around 1928. The Methodist Church assumed responsibility for the school in 1929 and purchased a property in Station Street, Box Hill, known as Gwynton Park. A new building, the Cato Block, was built there in 1930. The move to the new site generated much optimism, and a master plan of imposing buildings was developed. However, the Great Depression and World War II had a damaging effect on the school and, instead of implementing the master plan, increased numbers of students had to be accommodated at virtually no cost.

The school became co-educational in 1933 when girls were introduced to the boarding section of the school. That arrangement was unheard of at that time in mainstream church schools in Victoria, if not Australia. In 1936, there were 14 girls at the school and, in 1937, with 21 girls enrolled, co-educational classes were held. By 1945, there were 83 boys and 52 girls at the school and, by 1955, the numbers of students had increased to 174 boys and 73 girls. However, between 1964 and 1977, the school reverted to only enrolling boys.

In 1937, the school granted Wesley College an option to purchase its land and buildings, in return for funds from Wesley to reduce some of the school's debt. In 1946, with Wesley struggling for space to accommodate increasing numbers, it opened negotiations to take over the school, and an agreement was reached in 1947 which, in effect, vested the school in Wesley, but allowed the school to maintain its own council until Wesley was ready to proceed. That proved to be a slow process and, when Box Hill Grammar's own enrolments increased in the early 1950s, the council became less enamoured of the idea. In 1955, it was finally abandoned, with Wesley paying the school £4,500 to recoup losses while Wesley's control had restricted development.

The school was renamed Kingswood College in 1965, to reflect both the Methodist tradition and to help create a new image. Between 1963 and 1968, enrolments doubled and a new science block and library were opened. The opening of the Junior School, in 1971, was a significant development, both financially and educationally. A new Senior School centre, named for Charles Fitzroy Walker, a former 36-year principal, was opened in 1975, providing for a balanced academic and social education for Year 11 and 12 students. Co-education was re-introduced in 1977.

During the 1990s, the school tried to build its educational, sporting and artistic programs. A pre-school centre, Speedy House, was opened both 3-year-old and 4-year-old children. Computer, food technology and library facilities were upgraded, and a new technology centre was opened in 1996, which provided a modern environment for students to study graphics and develop skills in the area of production technology.

A new Middle School centre, opened in 2002, provided a base for Year 7 students and catered for a range of administrative functions. Landscaping was undertaken to complement the building. In 2005, the refurbishment of the Junior School was completed with new Grade 5 and 6 rooms. In 2008, construction began on a new Science Building, named after the then principal Annette Bennet. It was officially opened on the 28 March 2009. The former science block was completely renovated and became the Year 10 Centre. In 2010, Brimacombe Hall was refurbished to provide a larger auditorium and additional performance and rehearsal spaces.

The College is now in the first year of the current strategic plan. It has launched into a refurbishment and redevelopment plan with the completion of a Master Plan and overall landscape plan for the campus.

Next door to the school there is a private community named after the school called Kingswood Rise.

== Sources ==
- Wesley College - The First Hundred Years Geoffrey Blainey, James Morrisey and S.E.K. Hulme (1967) Robertson & Mullens
