= Margaret Pitt Morison =

Australian architect (1900–1985)

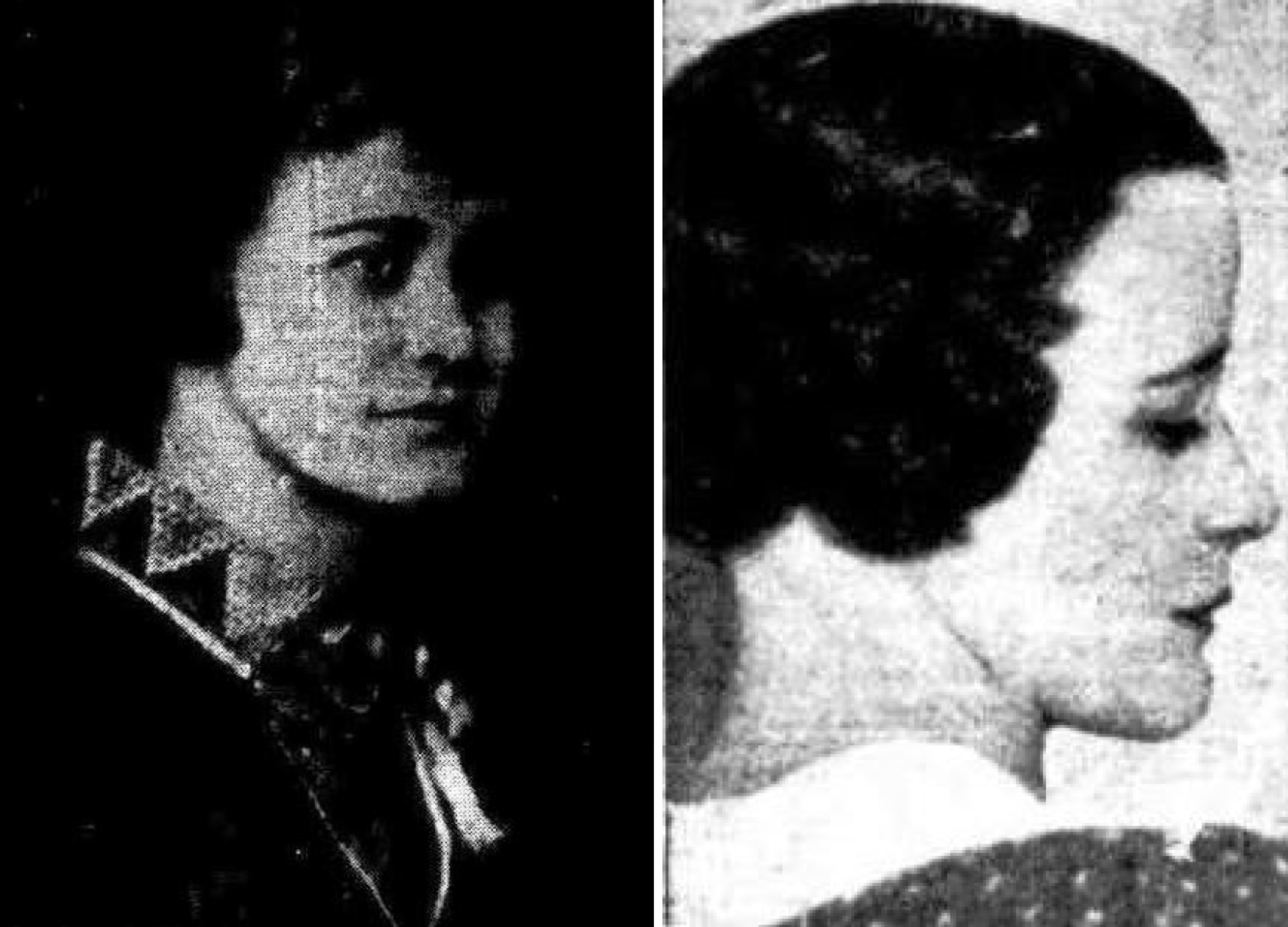
- Two portraits of Margaret Pitt Morison published in the West Australian Newspaper (17 May 1929, p.6; The Western Mail, 9 April 1936, p.28)
- Born: Margaret Lillian Pitt Morison; 3 December 1900; North Perth, Western Australia
- Died: 12 December 1985 (aged 85); Nedlands, Western Australia
- Occupations: Architect, lecturer
- Parent(s): George Pitt Morison; Frances Margaret (née Somner)

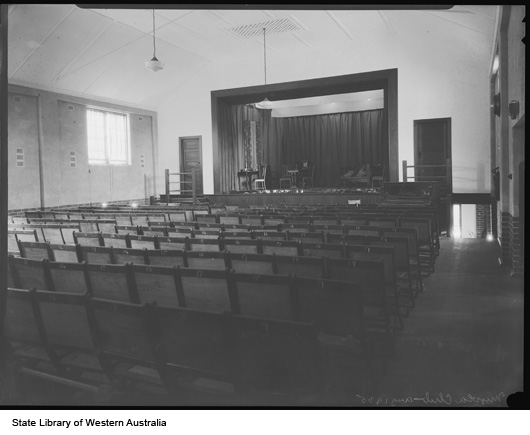
Myola Club Hall, Perth (August, 1935)

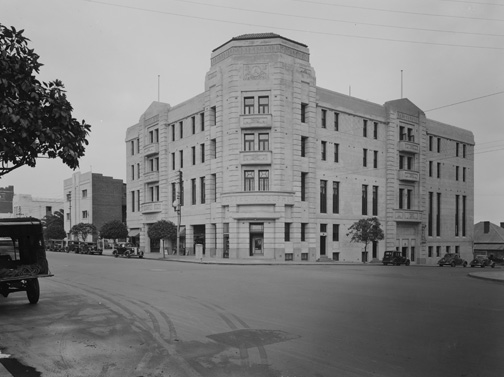
Adelphi Hotel, Perth (3 July 1936) designed by Margaret Pitt Morison

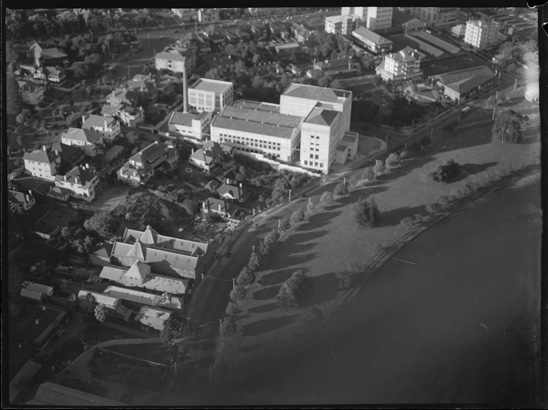
Emu Brewery, Perth (1938)

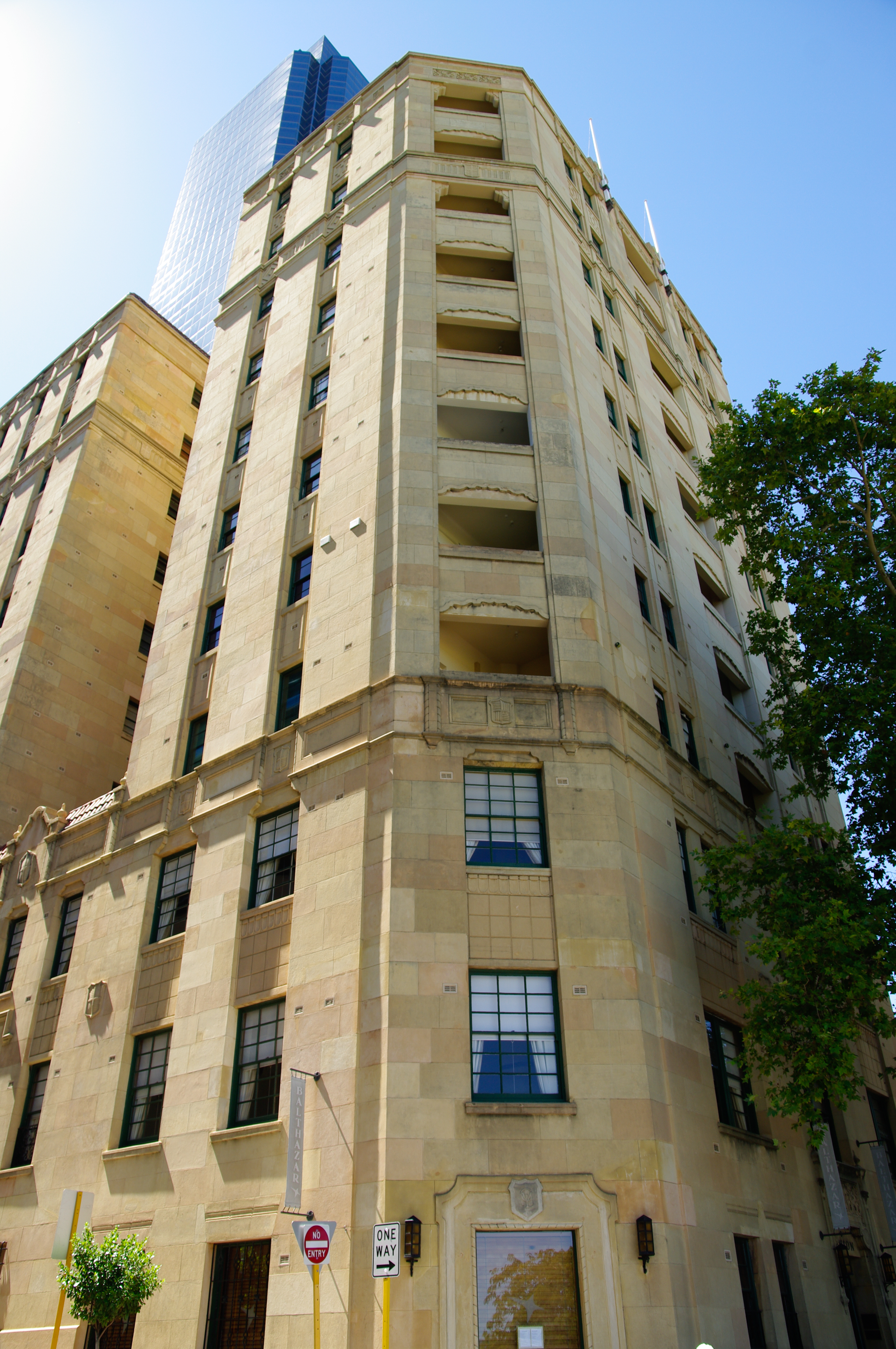
Lawson Apartments, Perth (21 March 2012)

Margaret Lillian Pitt Morison (3 December 1900 – 12 December 1985) was an Australian architect. She was the first female architect member in Western Australia. As a practitioner, educator and historian, she made important contributions to Australian architecture during the 19th and 20th most prominently in Western Australia.

== Early and personal life ==
Her father, George Pitt Morison, was a well known Australian painter and member of the WA Society of Arts, exhibiting from 1902 and 1906. Morison was born in North Perth.

She was educated at the St Hilda's Anglican School for Girls and Perth Modern School.

== Career ==
In 1920, Morison was articled to Geoffrey Edwin Summerhayes and completed her training with the firm of Eales & Cohen. She was registered as Western Australia's first female architect in October 1924. Late in 1925 she travelled to Melbourne, with her parents and in the following year she started working with the architectural firm, Cedric Ballantyne before studying at the University of Melbourne's Architectural Atelier. She then joined the firm, A. & K. Henderson. In 1929 she returned to Perth and joined an architectural firm established by F. G. B. Hawkins, where she worked on the design of the Atlas Assurance Company Office from 1930 to 1931. In the early 1930s, Morison joined the Poster Studios, a commercial art business established by architects Harold Krantz, John Oldham and Colin Ednie-Brown. She then undertook the design of the Myola Club in Claremont with Krantz in 1934.

During the following years, she worked mainly for Oldham, Boas and Ednie-Brown, where she did the interior detailing of the Adelphi Hotel, the remodelling of the Karrakatta Club in 1936 and the detailing of the Emu Brewery from 1936 to 1938.

In the late 1930s, she established herself as an architectural designer and set up her own practice with Heimann (Heinz) Jacobsohn. The practice, however, closed due to the outbreak of World War II.

She worked for the Commonwealth Department as a camouflage officer in 1942. She then went to Melbourne and was employed by architect H. Vivian Taylor, returning to Perth in 1948 where she taught an architectural course at Old Perth Technical School until 1962.

At the 1953 Western Australian state election, Pitt Morison stood as an Australian Labor Party candidate for the Legislative Assembly seat of Nedlands. Although she was not elected, there was a swing away from the sitting member Charles Court.

In 1967, she commenced work for the City Planners Department at the City of Perth as an assistant research officer, continuing until 1971. In 1971, she was employed by the University of Western Australia in the School of Architecture and Fine Arts as a research officer, where she remained until her death in 1985.

In 1979 she was made a Life Fellow of the Royal Australian Institute of Architects. In the same year she published Western Towns and Buildings, with co-editor John White, a comprehensive study of 19th and 20th century Western Australian Architecture.

== Death and legacy ==
Pitt Morison died at Nedlands on 12 December 1985.

The University of Western Australia awards the Margaret Pitt-Morison Memorial Prize to outstanding environmental design students.

The WA Chapter of the Australian Institute of Architects named their annual Margaret Pitt Morison Award for Heritage after her.

== Notable projects ==
=== Competition for house ===
In 1933 Morison won first prize of 2,500 pounds in a Western Australian competition, run by the Royal Institute of Architects.

=== Atlas Insurance Company Office ===
She was employed by F.G.B Hawkins to do some minor detailing and documenting work on this building, built in Perth in 1930.

=== Lawson Apartments ===
In 1936, Morison worked on the design of the Lawson Apartments with Harold Boas.

=== Adelphi Hotel ===
In 1936, Morison worked on the design of the hotel with Harold Krantz. Morison mostly worked on completing interior detailing over an extended period of time.

=== Marginata Flats ===
In 1940, Morison worked on the design of the flats with Jacobsohn.

=== Ruse Residence ===
In 1941, Morison worked on the design of the flats with Jacobsohn.

=== Packenham residence ===
This small project was completed while she was a first year studio master at Old Perth Technical School during 1954 in Kellerberrin.

== Bibliography ==
- Pitt Morison, Margaret; White, John Graham, eds. (1979). Western Towns and Buildings. Nedlands: UWA Press. ISBN 0-85564-156-8.
