= The Foundation of Perth 1829 =

1929 painting by George Pitt Morison

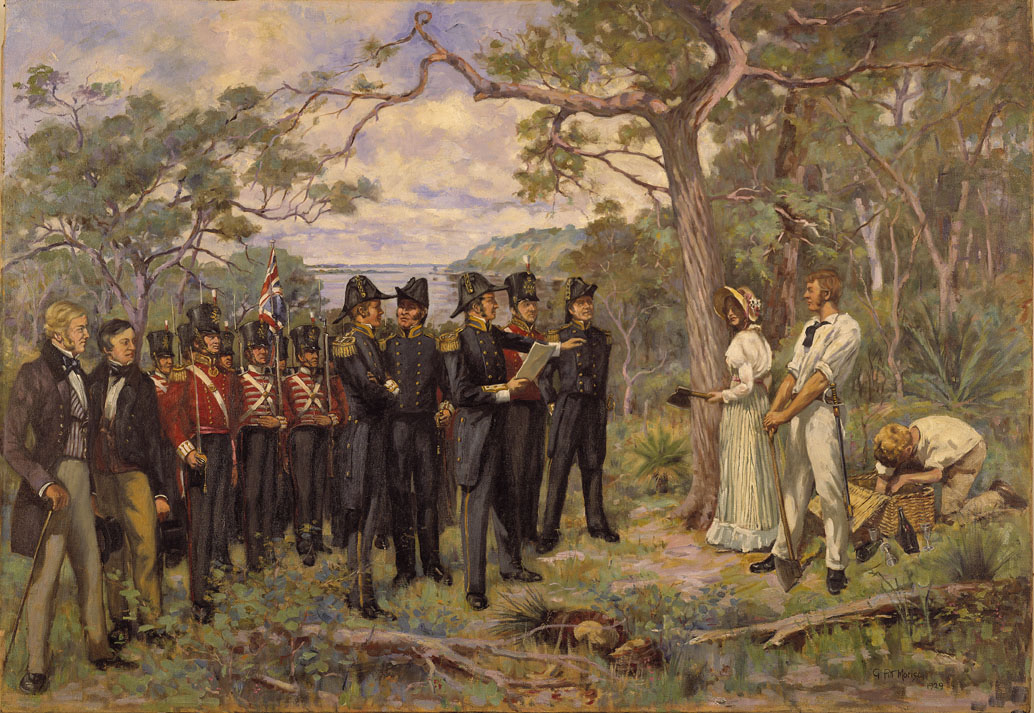
- Artist: George Pitt Morison
- Year: 1929
- Medium: Oil on canvas
- Dimensions: 96.5 cm × 137.8 cm (38 in × 54.3 in)
- Location: Art Gallery of Western Australia; Perth

The Foundation of Perth 1829 is a 1929 oil-on-canvas painting by George Pitt Morison. It depicts a reconstruction of the ceremony by which the town of Perth, Western Australia was founded on 12 August 1829. Morison painted the work as part of Western Australia's centenary celebrations, and presented it to the Art Gallery of Western Australia in February 1929.

The painting took George Pitt Morison almost eighteen months to research and paint. He studied a number of contemporary accounts of the ceremony, and had access to photographs of the people present.

The official ceremony depicted in the image was held on a small hill overlooking the Swan River, in the immediate vicinity of the present Perth Town Hall. As no stones were readily available, it was decided to mark the occasion by felling a tree. The only woman to accompany the party so far up the river from Fremantle, Mrs Helena Dance, was invited to strike the first blow. The Foundation of Perth depicts Mrs Dance holding the axe and about to make the first cut. Immediately to the right of her in the painting is an axe-man, waiting to complete the task.

Other people depicted in the work include Lieutenant Governor James Stirling, Captain Charles Fremantle, Commander Mark John Currie, Major Frederick Irwin, Captain William Dance, the Colonial Secretary Peter Broun, Doctor William Milligan and the Surveyor-General Lieutenant John Septimus Roe. Milligan, however, may not actually have been at the ceremony. While some records claim that Milligan arrived aboard HMS Sulphur on 8 June 1829, others claim that he emigrated to Western Australia with his wife, child and a nephew, arriving aboard Wanstead on 30 January 1830. If Milligan arrived on 30 January 1830, more than five months after the foundation ceremony, he cannot have been present.

The Foundation of Perth 1829 has become an "enduring and influential image" in the history of Western Australia. It was used extensively in both the 1929 centenary celebrations, and the WAY 1979 sesquicentennial celebrations. Often the painting is not acknowledged as an historical reconstruction, and many people have incorrectly come to accept it as an authentic record of the ceremony.
