= Down on His Luck =

Painting by Frederick McCubbin

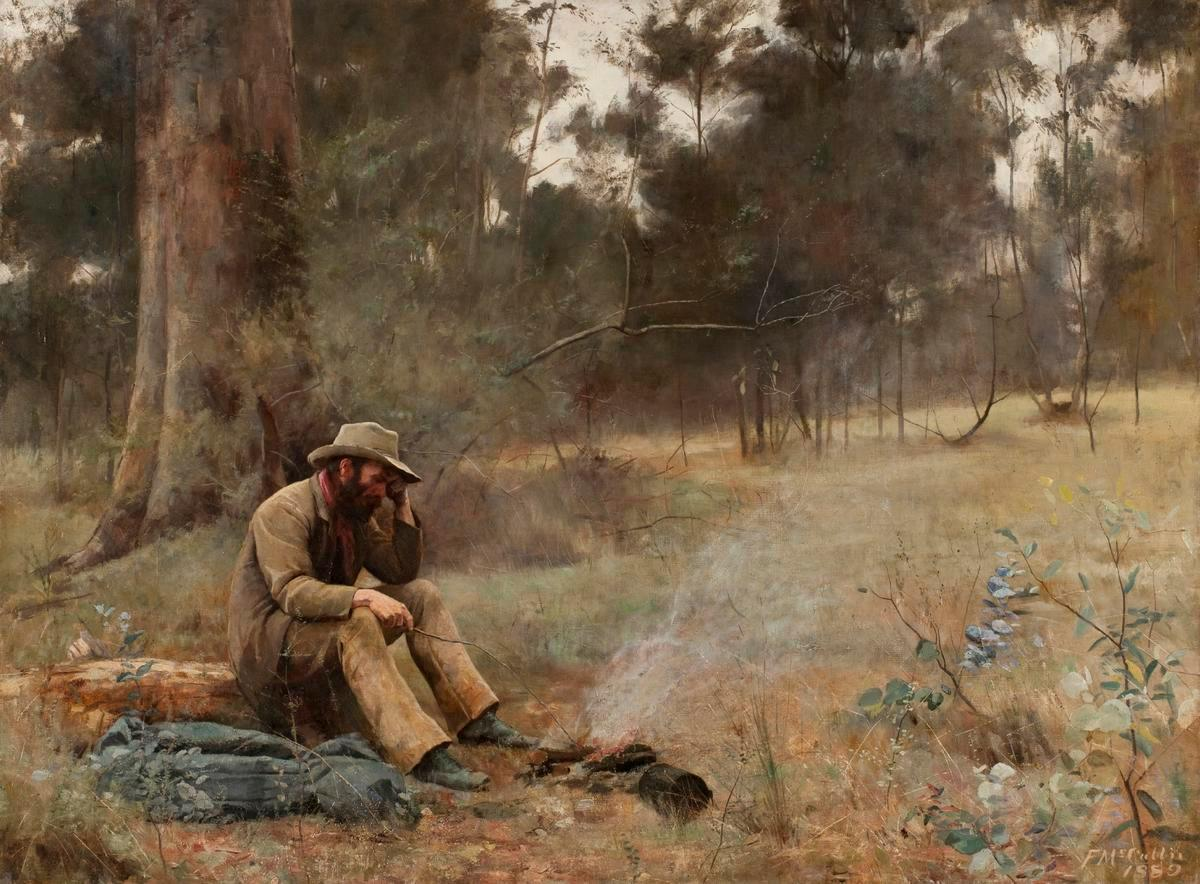
- Artist: Frederick McCubbin
- Year: 1889
- Medium: Oil on canvas
- Dimensions: 114.5 cm × 152.8 cm (45.1 in × 60.2 in)
- Location: Art Gallery of Western Australia; Perth

Down on His Luck is an 1889 painting by the Australian artist Frederick McCubbin. It depicts a disheartened swagman, sitting by a campfire in the bush and sadly brooding over his misfortune. According to an 1889 review, "The face tells of hardships, keen and blighting in their influence, but there is a nonchalant and slightly cynical expression, which proclaims the absence of all self-pity ... McCubbin's picture is thoroughly Australian in spirit." The surrounding bush is painted in subdued tones, reflecting his somber and contemplative mood.

The artist's model was Louis Abrahams, a friend and successful tobacconist in Melbourne who earlier supplied the cigar box lids for the famous 9 by 5 Impression Exhibition. The scene was staged near the Box Hill artists' camp outside Melbourne, but it is thought that McCubbin would have made additional studies of Abrahams under studio conditions.

The painting was owned by William Fergusson until it was purchased in 1896 by the Art Gallery of Western Australia in Perth.

On 19 January 2023, the painting was targeted by activists who painted a Woodside Petroleum logo on the Perspex case in which the painting was hung at the Art Gallery of Western Australia. The act was in protest to what they claimed to be the imminent destruction of sacred indigenous rock art sites by Woodside's operations in the Burrup Peninsula in Western Australia. The painting was undamaged.
