= George Pitt Morison =

Australian painter and engraver

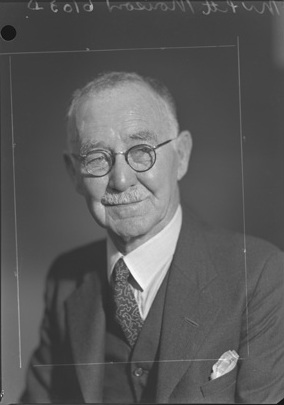
- Born: 31 August 1861
- Died: 4 September 1946 (aged 85)

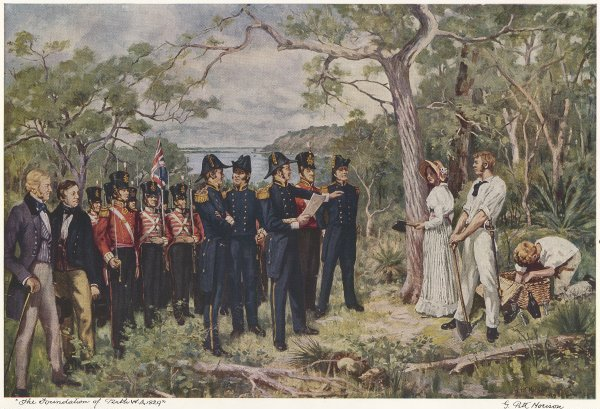
The Foundation of Perth 1829 by Morison

George Pitt Morison (31 August 1861 – 4 September 1946) was an Australian painter and engraver. He is noted in particular for his painting The Foundation of Perth 1829 which was commissioned as part of Western Australia's centenary celebrations, and presented to the Art Gallery of Western Australia in February 1929.

In 1890 Morison travelled to Europe to study at the Académie Julian in Paris and in the early 1930s worked as curator of art at the Western Australian Museum Art Gallery.

Morison was born on 31 August 1861 in Melbourne and died on 4 September 1946 in South Yarra, Victoria. His daughter Margaret Pitt Morison was the first female architect member in Western Australia.
