= May Vale =

Australian painter

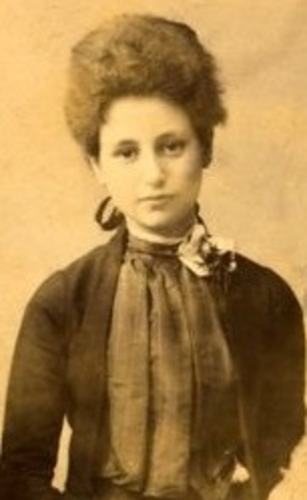
- Born: 18 November 1862; Ballarat, Victoria, Australia
- Died: 6 August 1945 (aged 82); Melbourne, Victoria, Australia
- Known for: Painting, Enamelling
- Movement: Australian Impressionism
- Spouse: Alexander Gilfillan (m. 1908–1940)

May Vale (18 November 1862 – 6 August 1945) was an Australian painter and enamelist. She was reportedly the first woman to be elected a member of the Buonarotti Society.

== Biography ==
Vale was born in Ballarat, the daughter of the Hon. W.M.K. Vale, on 18 November 1862.

== Training ==
Vale's family moved to Melbourne 1872 then to London, England in 1874, where Vale was educated at the South Kensington School (Royal College of Art) in London.

During 1879-1889, after returning to Melbourne, she attended the National Gallery Art Schools, studying under Oswald Rose Campbell, George Folingsby and Frederick McCubbin. Student colleagues at the school included Jane Sutherland and Clara Southern. Returning to London, she enrolled at the Linton School under Sir James Linton P.R.I. and Henry J. Stock R.I. then at Académie Julian in Paris for six months, under Jules Lefebvre and Tony Robert-Fleury.

== Australia ==
Back in Melbourne where her address in the 1890s was "Mayfield", Church Street, Abbotsford, Vale exhibited with the Victorian Artists Society in nearby East Melbourne from 1892. In 1893 opened a studio at 119 Swanston Street where she gave art lessons and worked as a commissioned portrait painter. She was said to be the first woman to join the Buonarotti Society, though there are other claimants including Alice Cherry (née Brotherton) in 1883, and she also joined the Yarra Sculptors' Society.

In 1895 Vale set up an art school in the Flinders Buildings, 304 Flinders Street, where she taught plein air painting. One of her students was Alice Marian Ellen Bale. Moving to Sydney in 1899, she exhibited with the Royal Art Society of New South Wales.

To study enamelling May returned to London's Chelsea Polytechnic Institute. in about 1906 and there met and married Alex Gilfillan on 20 August 1908.

Meanwhile in the 1907 Australian Exhibition of Women's Work her 1904 oil Spring at Mayfield, was shown. At the Society of Artists Exhibition, Sydney in 1919 she displayed enamelware brooches in techniques learned at the Chelsea Polytechnic.

== Style ==
Throughout her life Vale exhibited at venues including the Victorian Artists Society, the Women's Art Club, the Athenaeum, and held a one-woman show in 1927 at Queens Hall. Her intimist interpretation of Heidelberg School impressionist techniques is compared favourably with that of other women artists Jane Sutherland, Clara Southern and Jane Price.

== Legacy ==
At eighty-two years of age, Vale died on 6 August 1945, at 15 Ardoyne Street Black Rock, where she had lived since the late 1930s. She was buried at Cheltenham Cemetery, pre-deceased by her husband.

== Collections ==
- National Gallery of Victoria
- Art Gallery of New South Wales
- Castlemaine Art Museum
- Victorian Artists Society

== Gallery ==
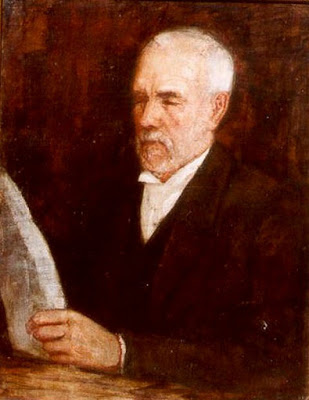
David Syme

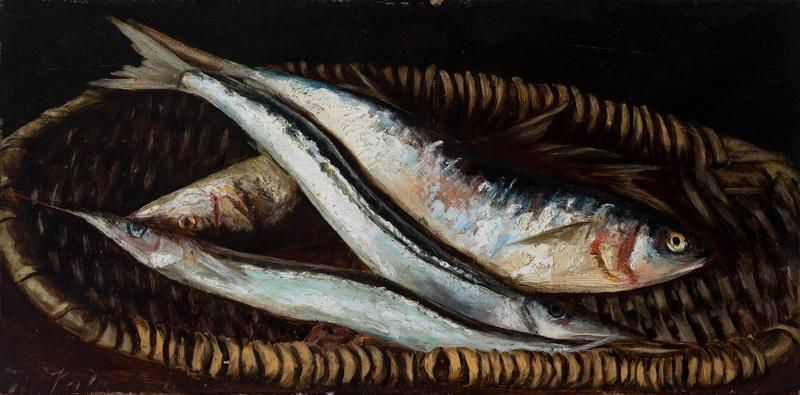
May Vale (1894) Sea Jewels. Oil on canvas 23.0 x 45.5 cm. Castlemaine Art Museum

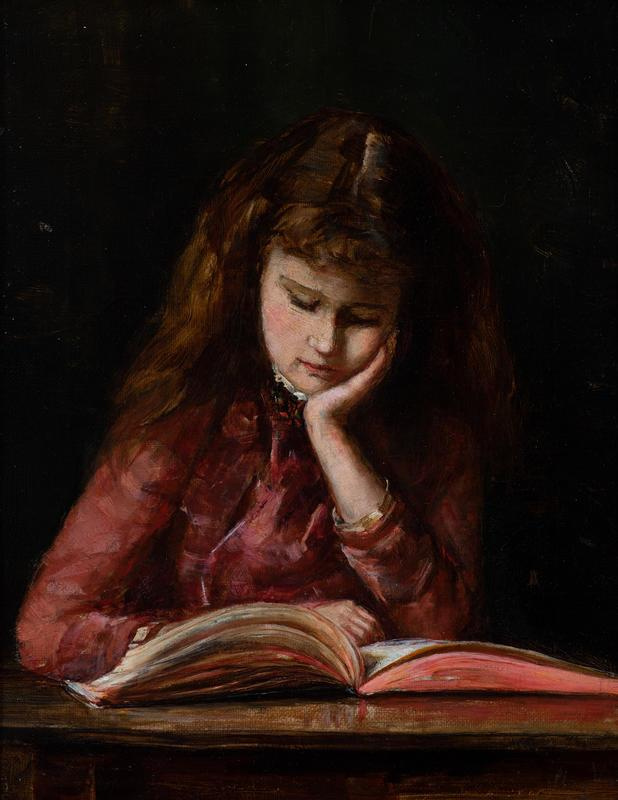
May Vale (1890s) A Girl Reading. Oil on canvas 25.6 x 20.7 cm. Castlemaine Art Museum

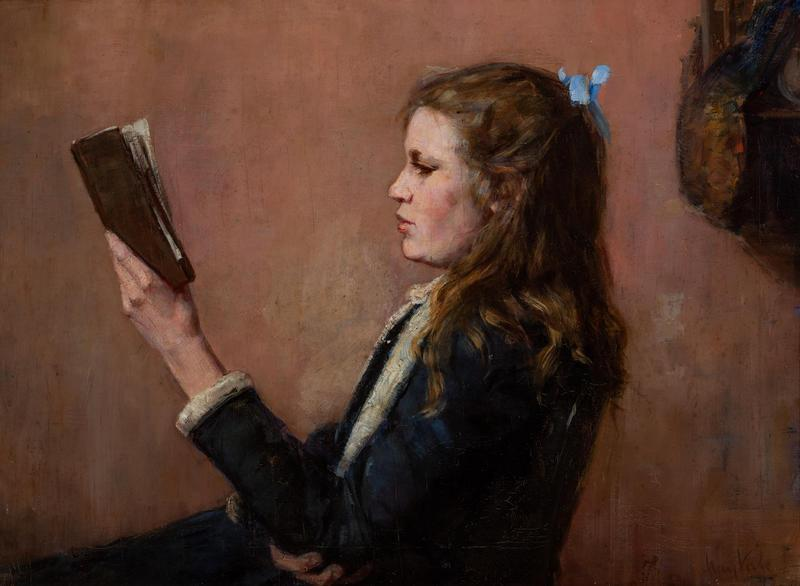
May Vale (1898) Faith Learning Her Lesson oil on canvas 51.0 x 69.0 cm. Castlemaine Art Museum

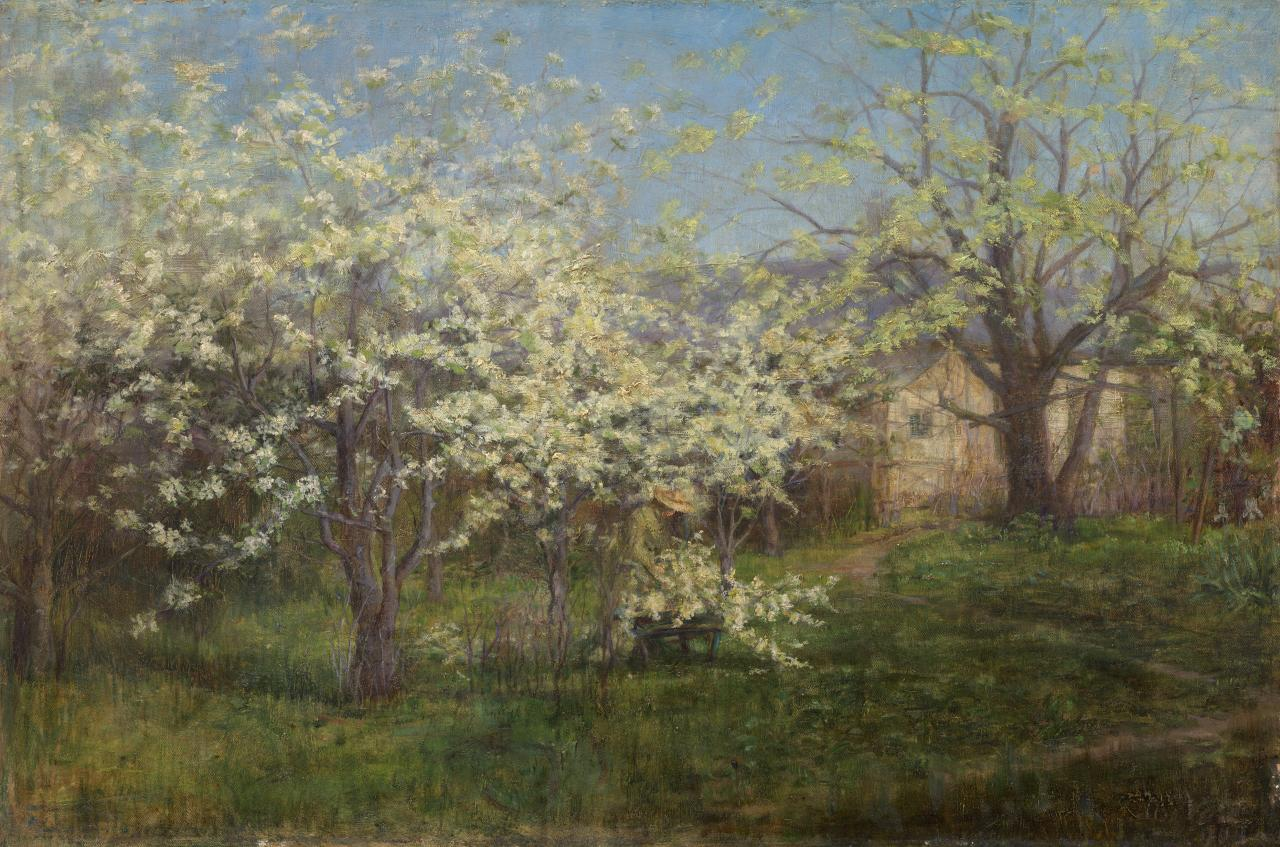
May Vale (c. 1904) The orchard, oil on canvas 48.8 × 74.4 cm. National Gallery of Victoria, Melbourne

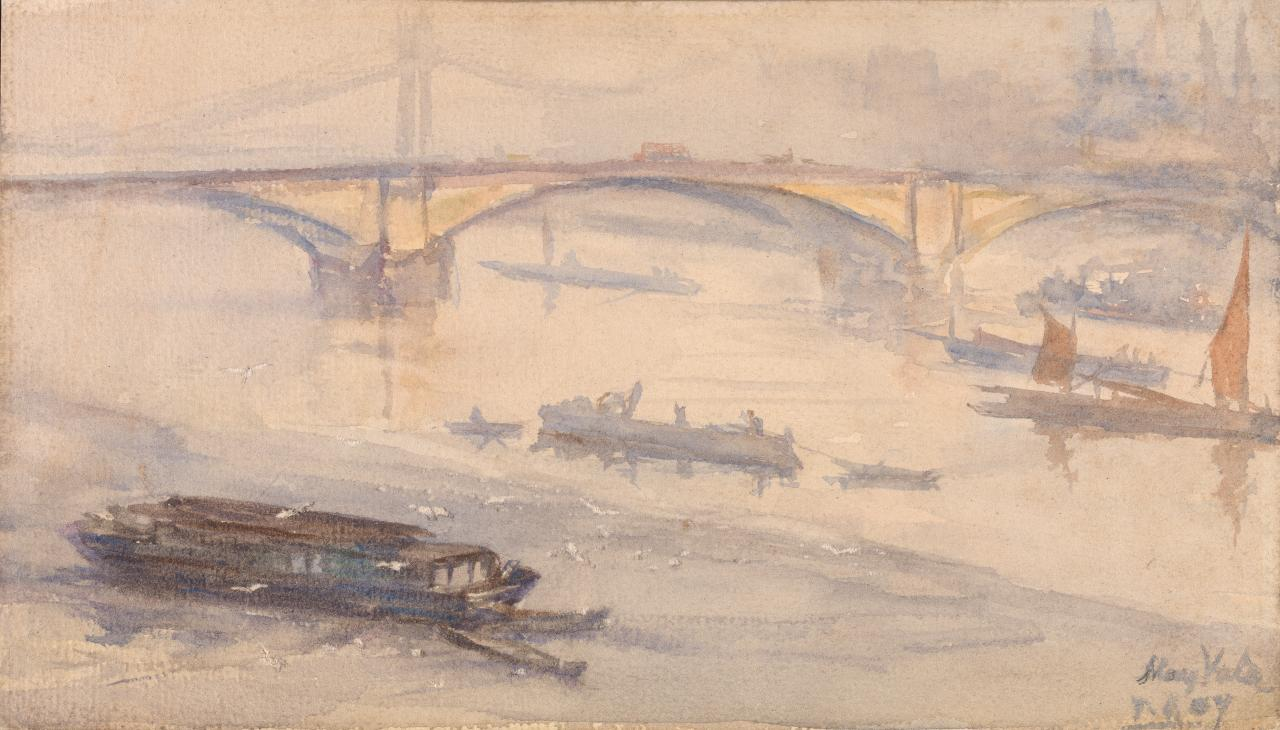
May Vale (1907) New Battersea Bridge & Chelsea Reach from Cheyne Walk, Chelsea. Watercolour on cardboard, 13.4 × 23.3 cm. National Gallery of Victoria
