= Buonarotti Club =

Australian artist association 1883–1887 in Melbourne

The Buonarotti Club was a bohemian artists' society in Melbourne, Australia between 1883 and 1887, associated with Heidelberg School of painters.

== Foundation ==
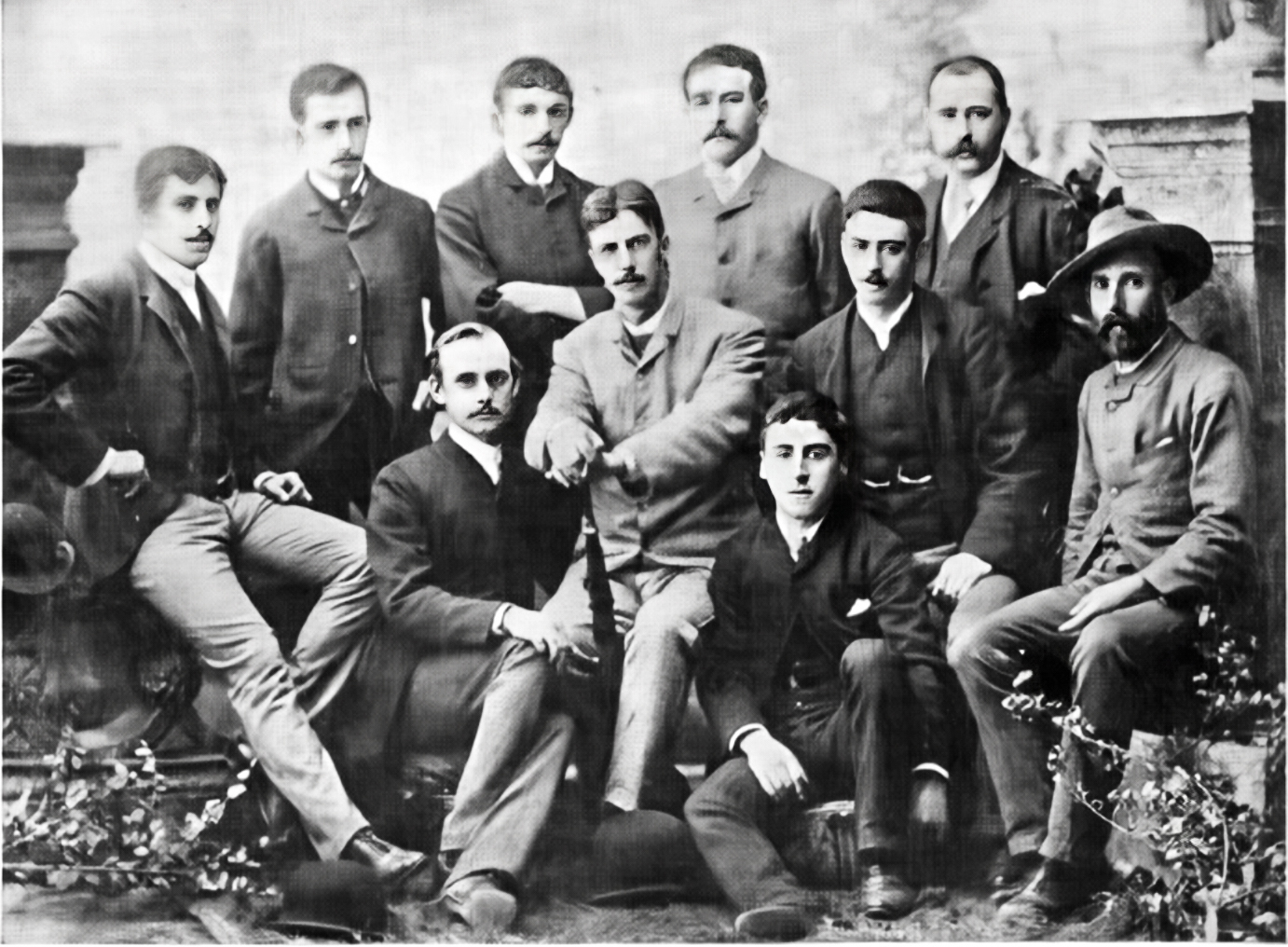
National Gallery School students who were members of the Buonarotti Club: Back L-R: J Longstaff, L Jones, A Colquhon, E Phillips Fox, F McCubbin 2nd row: T. St George Tucker, J Gibbs, D Davies, F Williams. Front: A Alston

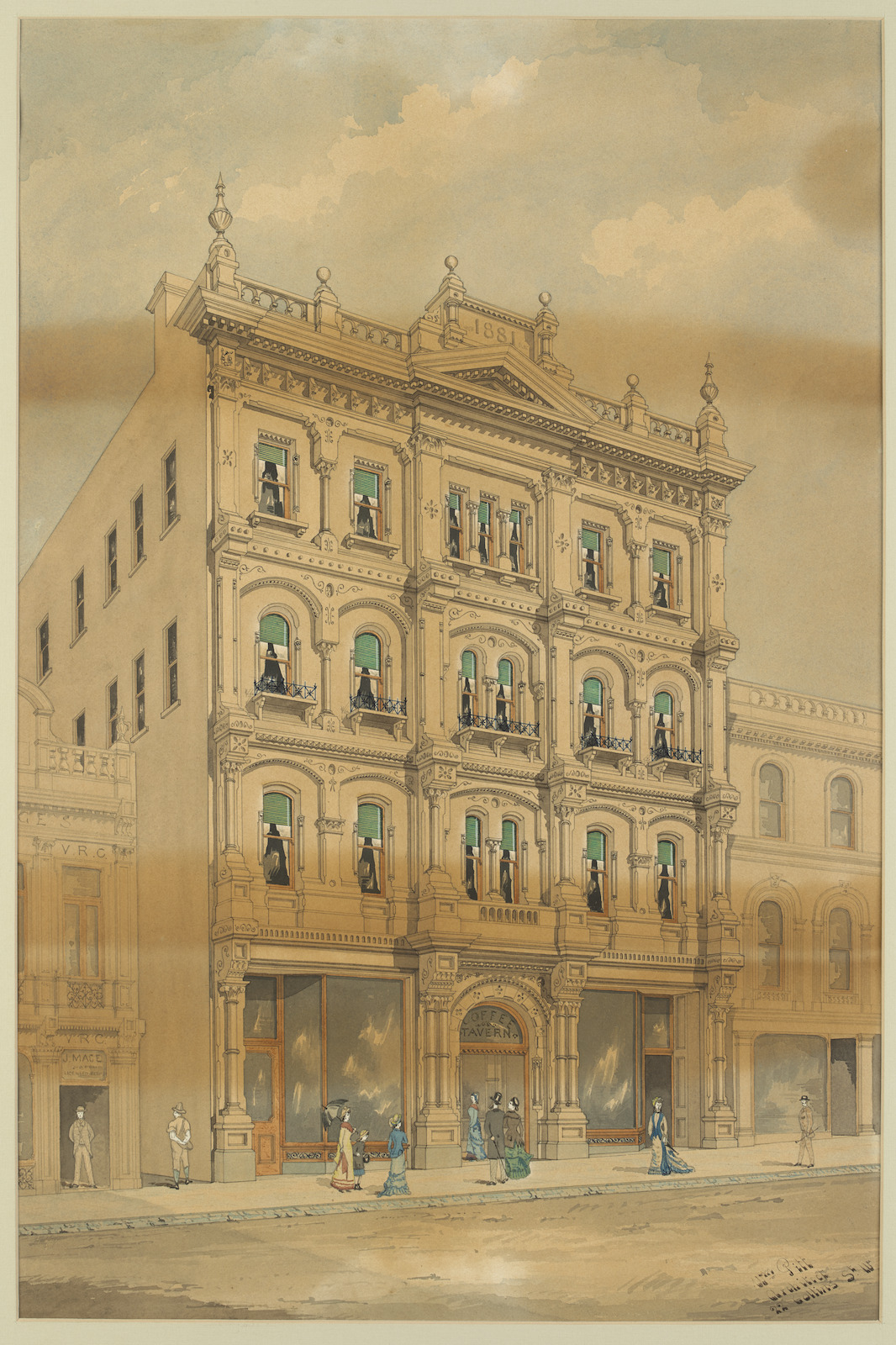
William Pitt, architect (c.1881) Melbourne Coffee Palace, 89 Bourke Street, Melbourne, architectural drawing

The Buonarotti Club was established in May 1883 by Cyrus Mason (c. 1829 – 18 August 1915) and his colleague Edward Gilks, senior engravers. Professional painters joining them in the inaugural meeting in May 1883 included Fred M. Williams, Tom Humphrey, (later Sir) John Longstaff and Alexander Colquhoun, and also younger artists, the art teachers, John L. Himen, Theodore Dewey and Izett Watson. Mason was secretary of the charitable Victorian Art Unions 1872–75, engraver, draughtsman and artist who was publishing views and maps in coloured lithographs from mid-century. Through his membership of Melbourne's Yorick Club, Mason was active in colonial literary, artistic and bohemian circles, and in the 1860s, was an illustrator for his friend Marcus Clarke, editor of the Colonial Monthly. He proposed the name 'Buonarotti' in honour of Italian sculptor, painter, draughtsman and architect Michelangelo di Lodovico Buonarroti Simoni (1475–1564), in accord with a widespread revival of interest in Michelangelo then in Europe and Britain, the spelling "Buonarotti" being then generally accepted. The Renaissance hero excelled in a number of artistic media and was thus an appropriate figurehead for a club with multidisciplinary membership, with one, Brian Gilks, regarding him as their 'patron saint'.

They met at the Prince's Bridge Hotel, now known as Young and Jackson's, on the corner of Swanston and Flinders streets. One of its owners was the art collector Henry Figsby Young (1845–1925), who decorated the hotel with nineteenth-century European and Australian paintings and displayed a selection of 'South Sea island weaponry' on the walls, making it an exciting and stimulating venue for aspiring bohemian artists and associates. After the club's early meetings at Young and Jackson's, the group continued at the Earl of Zetland also in Swanston Street, Sheehan's New Treasury Club Hotel on Spring Street, the Duke of Rothsay in Elizabeth Street and the newly established Melbourne Coffee Palace, Bourke Street.

== Identity and activity ==
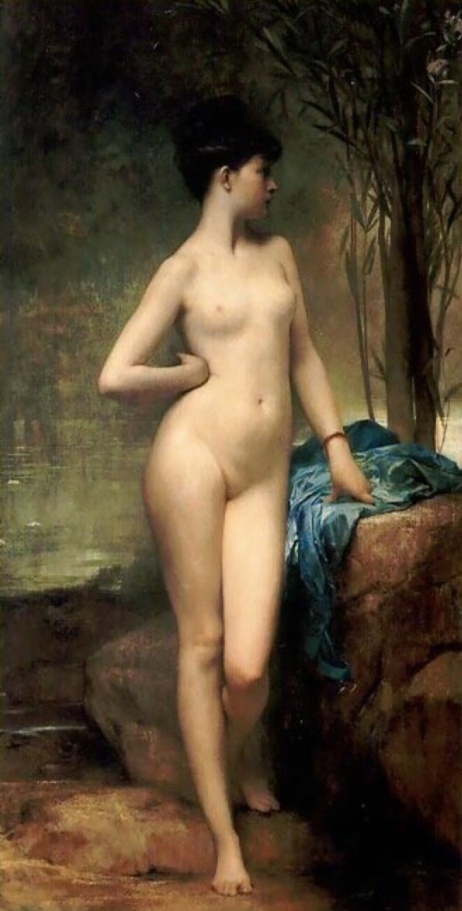
Jules Joseph Lefebvre (1875) Chloé. Oil on canvas, 260 cm × 139 cm (100 in × 55 in), Young and Jackson Hotel, Melbourne

While other art societies were established around this time, including the Victorian Academy of Arts (1870–1888), the Australian Artists Society (formed in 1886) and the Victorian Artists Society (1888), their purpose was the study and exhibition of art, while the Buonarotti Club was a unique entity. Club members joined one of three 'sections';'Artistic', 'Literary' and 'Musical', though most of its men and women were professional painters, including Frederick McCubbin, Louis Abrahams, Tom Roberts and Jane Sutherland.

It differed from the several other literary clubs and societies of Melbourne's 1880s, the Shakespeare Society, the Shelley Society, the Burns Society and the Lamb Society, in that it was artist-dominated, with members with professional goals, rather than amateurs, though it included emerging painters who came for critique and instruction from their peers, and opportunities to exhibit and to be received by Melbourne art world. Music and literature provided further topics for discussion.

The character and reputation of its founding members established the club as being devoted to artistic development; experienced professionals providing guidance to the aspiring artist-teachers. A 1936 Adelaide News article notes that L. T. Luxton's Memories of Noted Artists "conveys the startling information that Sir John Longstaff in those days (the 'eighties) was a most brilliant performer on the piano and used to entertain the [Buonarotti] members regularly with recitals of a high classic order. This is news, for few of us were aware that he was a practitioner."

The Luxton article further adds David Davies and E. Phillips Fox to its list of members.

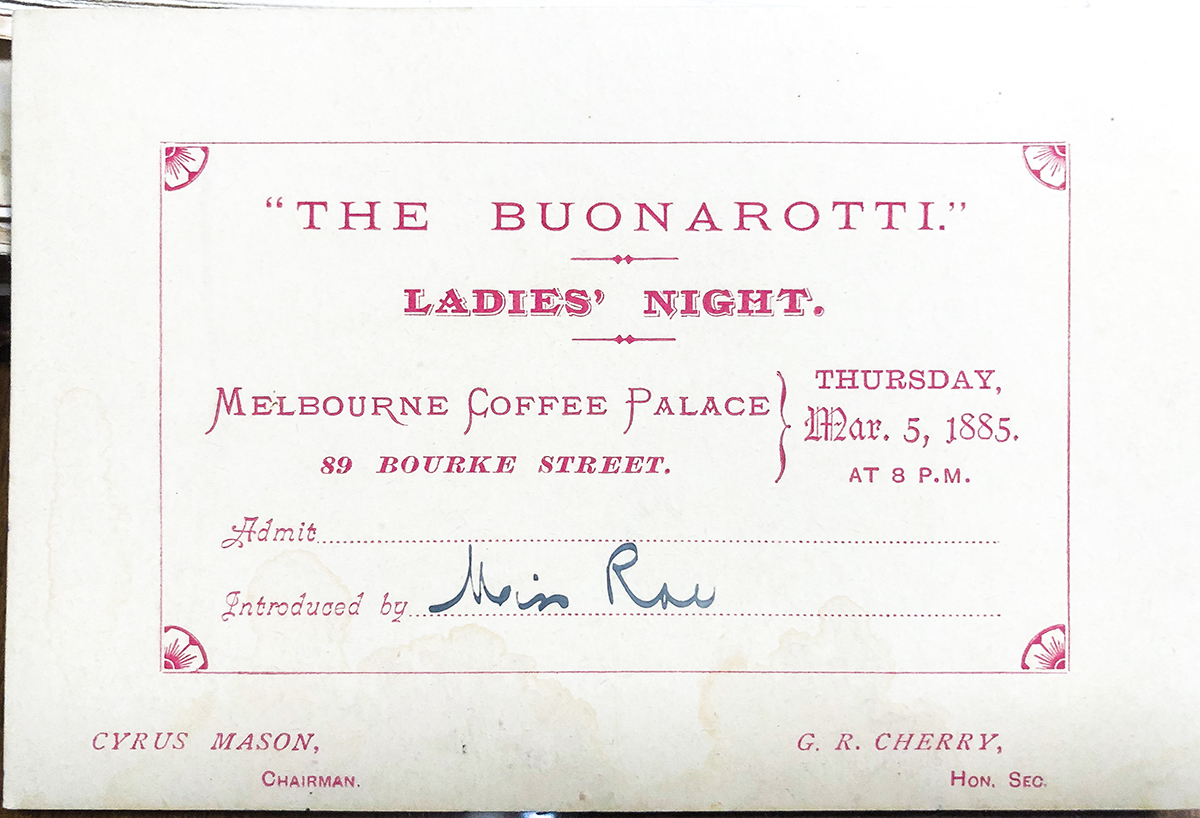
Original copy of "The Buonarotti" Ladies Night guest entry card made out to Miss (Iso) Rae. Mason Firth & McCutcheon. Printers, Melbourne 1885. Private Collection

The club enjoyed the patronage of a sophisticated following of art lovers and collectors through a quarterly conversazione (called sometimes 'The Ladies' Nights'), which took place in the prestigious Melbourne Coffee Palace. The programmes issued show that musical members sang or played (Mason himself was earlier the publisher of an original score The Song of the Bush) while the Artistic Section exhibited new work. Guests partook of supper at one shilling per head and mingled with the members, who were identified by a maroon ribbon on their lapel and showed guests 'large numbers of paintings in oils and watercolours, portfolios of sketches and specimens of wood engraving'. These evenings followed on a smaller scale the lead of London's Grosvenor Gallery which in the 1870s had attracted art audiences to Grand Opening banquets, 'invitationals', Sunday openings, private views, at-homes and soirées.

Similarly, the name of the Buonarotti Club is evidence of the group's imitation of the European revival of interest in Michelangelo. With reference to the old master's study of the human body and its movement, as discussed by Cyrus Mason in a club lecture, life classes were conducted by the club. Member Alice Brotherton wrote and delivered poems in 1884 to celebrate the 400th anniversary of Michelangelo's birth and his devotion to "art for art's sake", and devised the club's motto attributed to Michelangelo, Puolidie Addisco ('Still I learn'), while Rodney Cherry in 1885 lectured on a biography of the artist. Lecture topics ranged across discussion of the relative merits of professional and amateur art, the portrait, 'Art in Education' and beauty in art. Other members, including Mason presented progress on a personal project, or on other artists and intellectuals, with presentations about Oliver Goldsmith (also by Mason), Ralph Waldo Emerson (by Tudor St. George Tucker) and Professor William Denton (Henry B. Blanche). Alexander Colquhoun, in satirical verse, urged the Victorian National Gallery to hang French painter Jules Lefebvre's controversial 1875 nude Chloé loaned to it by its purchaser Dr Thomas Fitzgerald. The club discussed the desirability of duty being charged on imported artworks. Tom Roberts promoted the role of professional artists in providing feedback to members on their work and in selection of works for exhibition.

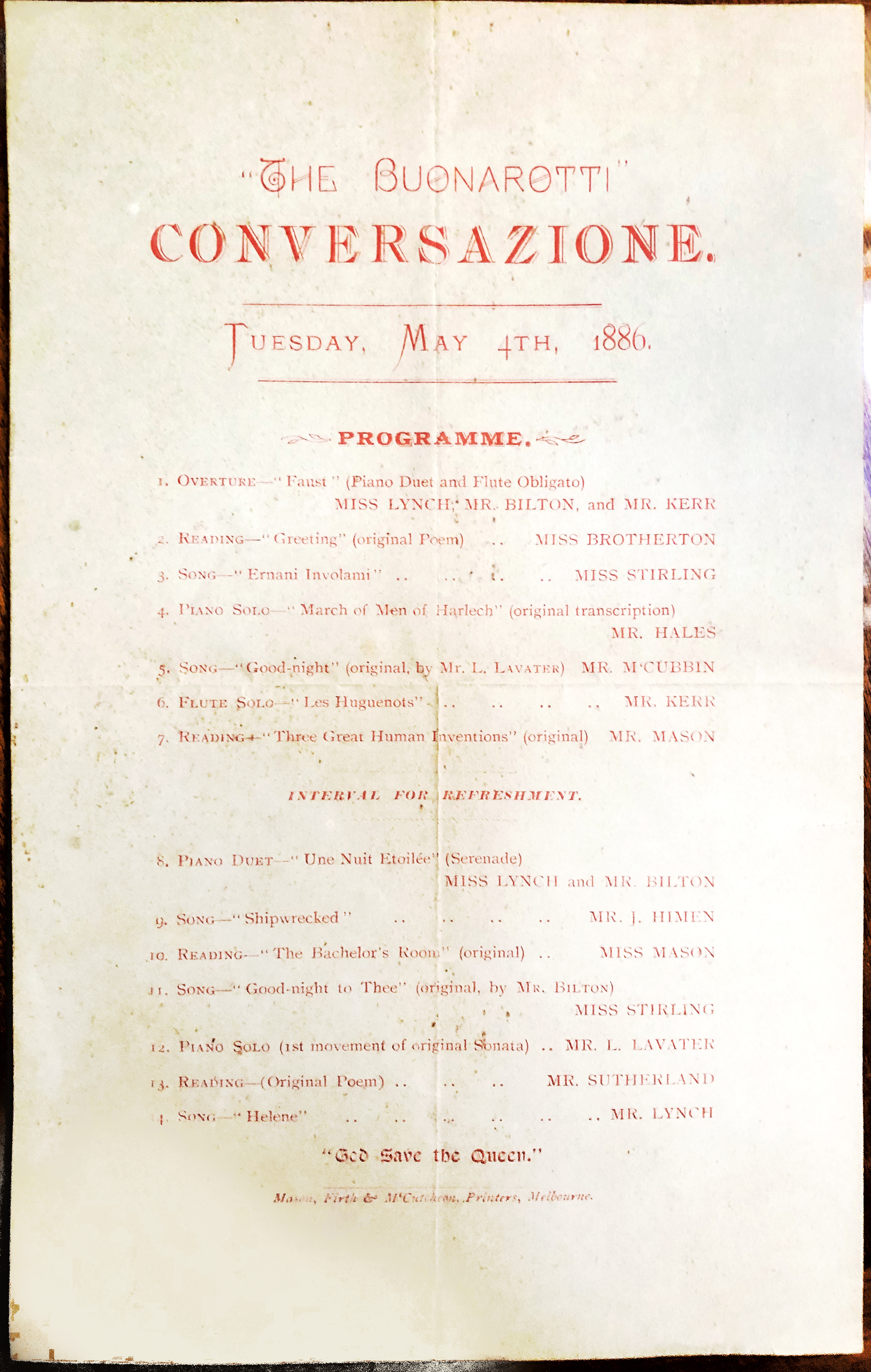
Original copy: The Buonarotti Conversazione. Tuesday, May 4th, 1886. Programme. Mason Firth & McCutcheon. Printers, Melbourne 1886. Private Collection

"The Buonarotti" Conversazione Programme for Tuesday, May 4, 1886, offered;

1. Overture - Faust (Piano Duet and Flute Obligato) Miss Lynch; Mr. Bilton, and Mr. Kerr
2. Reading - Greeting (original Poem) Miss Brotherton
3. Song - Ernani Involami Miss Stirling
4. Piano Solo - March of Men of Harlech (original transcription) Mr. Hales
5. Song - Good-night (original, by Mr. L. Lavater) Mr. McCubbin
6. Flute Solo - Les Huguenots Mr. Kerr
7. Reading - 'Three Great Human Inventions' (original) Mr. Mason

Interval For Refreshment.

1. Piano Duet - Une Nuit Etoilée (Serenade) Miss Lynch and Mr. Bilton
2. Song - Shipwrecked Mr J Himen
3. Reading - The Bachelor's Room (original) Miss Mason
4. Song - Good-night to Thee (original, by Mr. Bilton) Miss Stirling
5. Plano Solo - (1st movement of original sonata) .. Mr. L. Lavater
6. Reading - (Original Poem) .. Mr. Sutherland
7. Song - Helene Mr. Lynch
8. God save the Queen

== The Buonarotti Club and the Heidelberg School ==
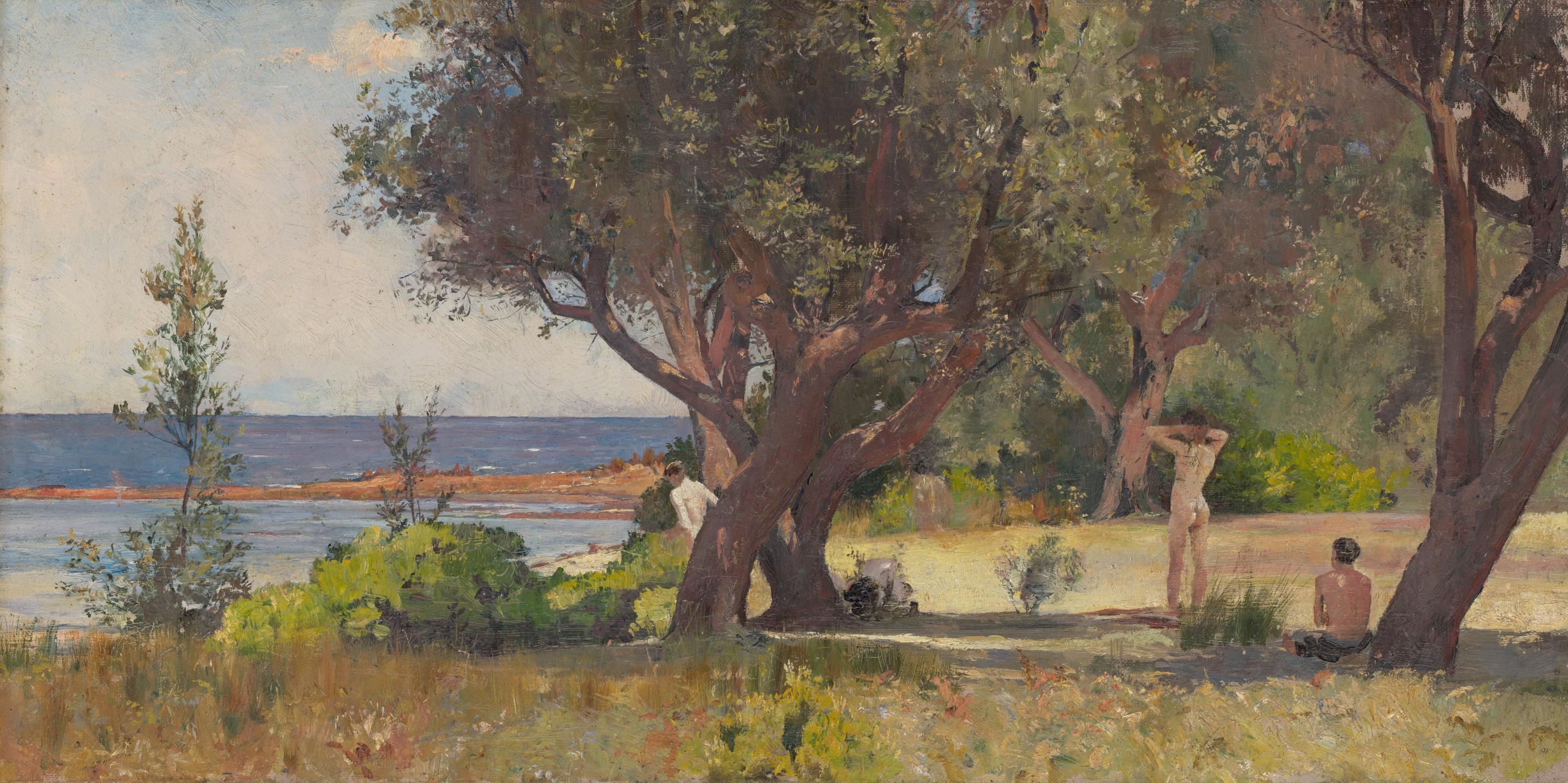
Tom Roberts, The Sunny South, c. 1887

Mead emphasises the priority of interests within the Buonarotti Club before they emerged in the Heidelberg School in that the club encouraged its members to paint en plein air and established artists' camps prior to that conducted by Tom Roberts, Fred McCubbin and Louis Abrahams (associates of the club) at Houston's farm, near the present-day Melbourne suburb of Box Hill in 1885. Mead gives April 1884 as the date when club secretary Rodney Cherry wrote to the Secretary for Railways requesting travel at reduced rates.

Buonarotti Club artists who would later become members of the so-called Heidelberg School, exhibited plein air works and were subject to the influence of their peers in the club. McCubbin joined in 1883; Abrahams in 1884 and Roberts attended as a guest in June, September and November 1885, and was elected a member in January 1886. Members painting landscape in the open air included Fred Williams (1883–1884); Tudor St. George Tucker, 1884 and 1885; Walter Withers 1884; and Tom Humphrey late 1886 and early 1887. Buonarotti Club members camped and painted at Eaglemont contemporaneously with the early Heidelberg School period (1883–1887) and also at Koo-Wee-Rup Swamp, setting out from Mason's Tynong estate.

McCubbin, during his years of membership in the Buonarotti Club and his chairing of its art committee in 1884, and as Mead notes, painted Home Again (1884), Lost and Winter Evening, Hawthorn in 1886 and Moynes Bay, Beaumaris in 1887, and in the Melbourne suburb of Studley Park painted The Letter (1884), Picnic at Studley Park (1885), followed in 1886 by The Yarra, Studley Park, Two Sisters on a Rocky Hillside and Sunset Glow. Tom Roberts, also prolific while in the club, produced A Quiet Day on Darebin Creek in 1885, and in the next year The Artists' Camp, Coming South, Wood Splitters and A Summer Morning Tiff, then The Sunny South and Mentone in 1887. In the final year of the Buonarotti Club, Jane Sutherland painted Obstruction, Box Hill (1887). All are major works in the respective artists' careers.

Member Alexander Colquhoun later contributed significantly to research into the early history of Australian art, and the Heidelberg School in early monographs on McCubbin (1919) and Walter Withers (1920).

== Women artists ==
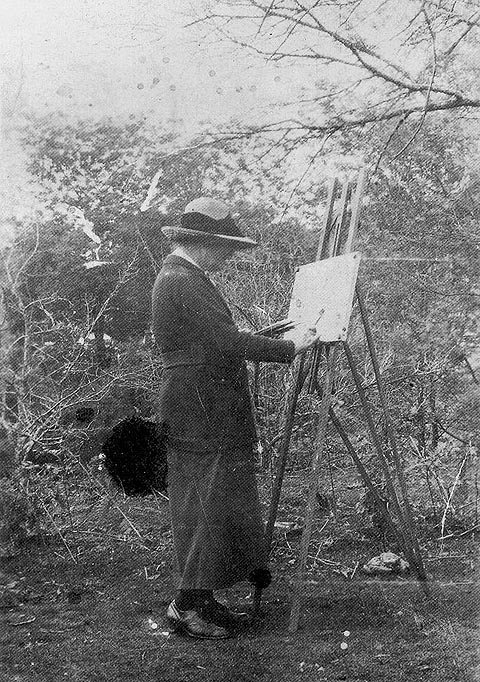
Clara Southern painting at her home in Warrandyte.

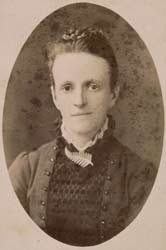
Jane Sutherland

While the club members were identified as adopting a bohemian persona and a devotion to Aestheticism, particularly the dandy Tudor St George Tucker, and expressed an often extrovert and eccentric artistic fraternity and sense of humour, a more lasting and constructive impact was its promotion of women artists.

Humphrey McQueen notes Jane Sutherland's chairing of its meetings, and Mary Eagle concurs that the club played an important role in Sutherland's career at a period when she needed professional stimulation, describing the club as a 'place where art and intellectual ideas were debated without fear or favour'.

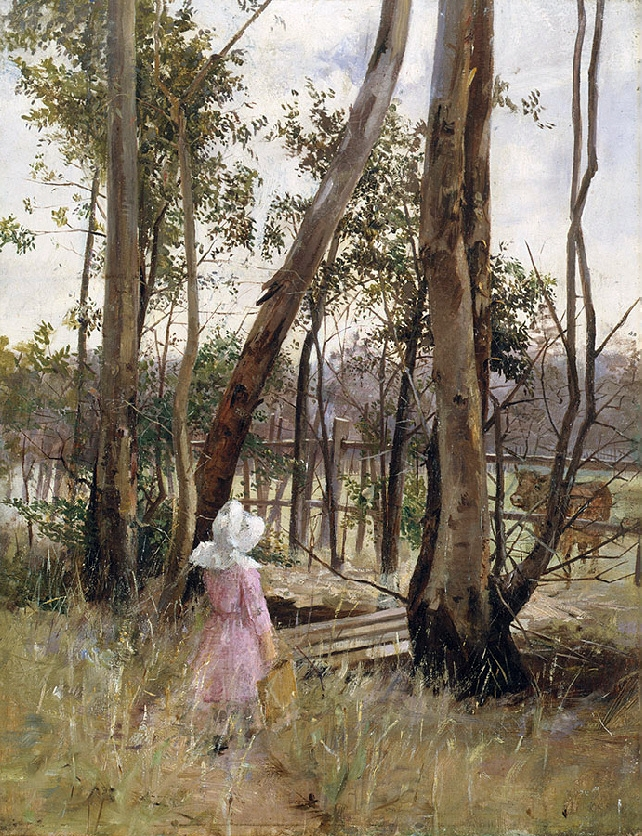
Jane Sutherland, Obstruction, Box Hill, 1887

Alice Chapman, Isobel (Iso) Rae, Clara Southern and May Vale, gained similar opportunities as Sutherland. While Clara Southern is usually described as 'among the first women to be elected to the Buonarotti Society in 1886' in fact while she did join in that year, several other female artists were already members and it was Alice Brotherton, sister of Winnie Brotherton who was the first woman elected to the club in 1883 (and who married Rodney Cherry), followed by Sutherland and Vale, who both joined in 1884.

Other Buonarotti members who joined in 1886 were the sculptor Margaret Baskerville, A. E. 'Lizzie' Oakley, and watercolourist Elizabeth Parsons, talented aspiring female artists active in the club's professional artistic environment, and welcomed as equals by their male counterparts.

== Demise ==
The Buonarotti Club wound up in late 1887. Composer and member Louis Lavater regarded the lack of leadership by the Artistic Section as responsible for its demise after the loss of stalwarts Longstaff (left for London September 1887), Julian Gibbs (killed February 1887), and Cyrus Mason himself. The final minutes contain a 'Farewell' at the Coffee Palace on 23 August 1887, to John Longstaff who sailed to London. Over 30 attended, including Cyrus Mason, Elizabeth Parsons, Alice Brotherton, Jane Sutherland, McCubbin, Lavater, Abrahams, Humphrey, J. Llewellyn Jones, Altson and guest Arthur Streeton. The Australasian reported;

The Buonarotti — an artistic, literary, and musical club — held its monthly meeting on Wednesday evening at the Melbourne Coffee Palace. The attendance was large owing to the circumstance that before another meeting will take place Mr. Longstaff, an old comrade in the artistic section of the Buonarotti, will be on his voyage to Europe. The president, Mr. Cyrus Mason, referred to the many happy meetings held since 1883, when the club was founded, at which Mr. Longstaff had assisted, and said that he was the fifth comrade who had proceeded to Europe for the purposes of study. The president reminded the comrades that though the club was not a mutual admiration society, but founded for work and searching criticism, he felt justified in assuring Mr. Longstaff of the comrades' admiration of his work which had gained the National Gallery medal. Amongst other good music a song was well rendered by Miss Ridley. The words, by Miss Brotherton, spoke the farewell of the club to Mr. Longstaff, and the music was by Mr. L. Lavater.

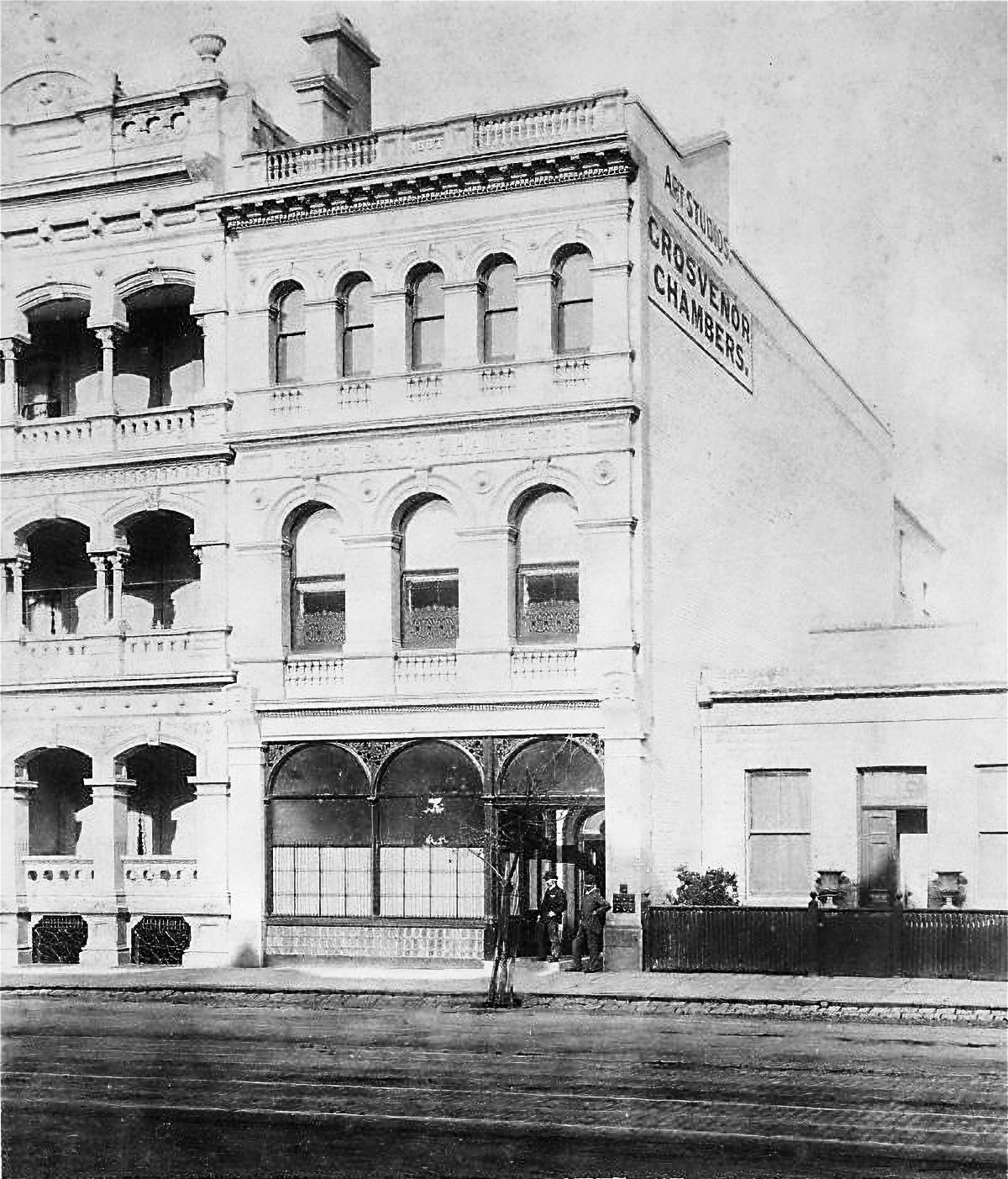
Grosvenor Chambers in 1888-1899

From 1888, Tom Roberts conducted a series of conversaziones in the Grosvenor Chambers in Collins Street where he and other former members of the Buonarotti Club had studios, inviting other artists to bring their newest French and other art journals for coffee, song and discussion "in true Bohemian style." One such event in 1889 attracted two hundred guests including His Excellency the Acting-Governor William C. F. Robinson and Lady Robinson, "who expressed themselves as very pleased with the conversazione."

Former member Elizabeth Parsons founded a similar club in 1889, known as Stray Leaves, comprising several ex-Buonarotti members.

== Members and associates ==
- Louis Abrahams
- Abbey Altson, who later drew the cover for Pearson's Magazine
- Margaret Baskerville, later married C. Douglas Richardson
- Alice Brotherton, wife of Rodney Cherry and sister of Winnie Brotherton
- Jennings Carmichael
- Alice Chapman
- Rodney Cherry
- Alexander Colquhoun
- David Davies
- Theodore Dewey
- E. Phillips Fox
- Julian Gibbs, born John James Gibbs (c. 1860 – 23 February 1887)
- Edward Gilks
- John L. Himen
- Tom Humphrys
- J. Llewellyn Jones
- Louis Lavater
- John Longstaff
- Cyrus Mason
- John Mather
- Frederick McCubbin
- A. E. "Lizzie" Oakley (1864–1942), highly praised flower painter, subject of a contemporary illustrated biography
- Elizabeth Parsons
- John Ford Paterson
- Iso Rae
- Tom Roberts
- Clara Southern
- Maggie Stirling, singer, perhaps the sister of geologist James Stirling
- Alexander Sutherland
- Jane Sutherland
- Tudor St G. Tucker
- May Vale
- Izett Watson
- Fred M. Williams
- Walter Withers
