= Alice Chapman =

Australian artist (1860–1929)

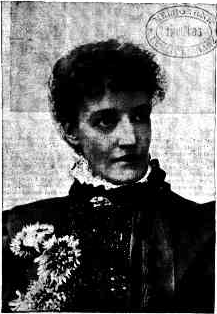
- Born: 1860; Inglewood, Victoria, Australia
- Died: 1929 (aged 68–69); St. Kilda, Victoria, Australia
- Education: National Gallery of Victoria Art School, Melbourne
- Known for: Painter, Portraitist
- Awards: 2 Jury awards, Melbourne Centennial International Exhibition, 1888 Gold medal for figure painting, Bendigo Exhibition, Bendigo Art Gallery, 1894

Alice Chapman (1860–1929) was an Australian artist known for her portraits and genre paintings (scenes depicting ordinary people in everyday situations). Her oeuvre also included still life paintings.

== Early life ==
The Chapman family was living in Inglewood, Victoria when Alice was born in 1860. The site was a significant gold field until the end of the century. Her father Joel Chapman was a quartz miner. Her mother was Anne Robertson; who married Joel Chapman in 1858. Alice was the first born child and she had three younger sisters. Her family left the gold fields and moved to the suburb of Armadale in Melbourne during her childhood. Joel Chapman died in Armadale in 1908, aged 81; his wife Anne died in St Kilda 1912, aged 72.

After her schooling Chapman embarked upon her formal training as an artist, attending the National Gallery of Victoria Art School 1876–1886. While there, she studied under G. F. Folingsby. She was amongst the women students at the school who rebelled against the unequal treatment of male and female students. For this assertiveness, Chapman was punished by dismissal (although she was re-instated by the trustees after an outcry in the press and the art community).

During her years of training, her fellow students included some of the artists who were central to the future development of Australian impressionism, known as the Heidelberg school, many of whom she knew through her membership of the Buonarotti Club. Tom Roberts was one such who, in 1887, painted her younger sister, Ethel Chapman, (aged 12), Blue eyes and Brown.

== Career ==
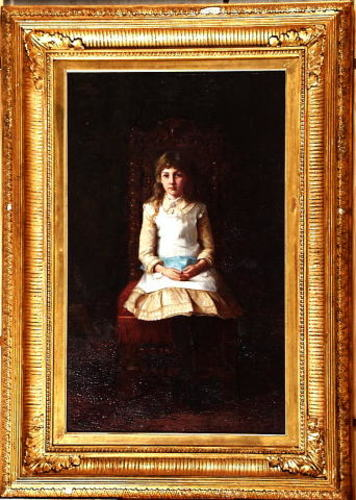
Sitting in State, c. 1888, Museums Victoria

On completion of her training, Chapman chose No. 8, Planet Chambers, Collins Street, Melbourne for her professional studio. She chiefly specialised in portraiture and genre painting, and regularly showed her work in public exhibitions, with success.

Exhibitions in which she participated included:

- 1887 Australian Art Association exhibition, There’s nothing new under the sun.
- 1888 Melbourne Centennial Exhibition. Gained Jury awards for Sitting in State and Gretchen
- 1888–1892 Victorian Artists Society Chapman showed regularly with the Society

One painting, Wharves near Spencer Street, 1910, can be seen online in the collection of the State Library of Victoria, which states that although the painting was owned by Chapman, it is now thought possibly to be by another painter.

She painted a portrait of operatic tenor Philip Newbury, which was shown at the home of him and his wife as part of an event for the Austral Salon. She exhibited alongside such artists as Frederick McCubbin, Walter Withers, and Clara Southern.

Chapman was honoured in 1894, by being appointed an Honorary Life Governor of the Bendigo Art Gallery, in the same year that she won the gallery's gold medal for figure painting for her work of Mr J. F. Sullivan, first mayor of Bendigo. Sullivan was not the only mayor she painted, Chapman also doing a portrait of H. M. Gooch, mayor of Prahran, that was to be hung in Prahran Town Hall. In her time, she was referred to as "one of the most conscientious and versatile of Australian-born painters."

She was a member of the Victorian Artists' Society until 1908, and exhibited there on a regular basis until 1892.

In 1911 Chapman's sister, Ethel Margaret (b. 1875) died. Ethel had married Ewart Paul in 1904. Their two young children, Violet Evelyn (b. 1907) and Charles William (b. 1910), became the responsibility of Chapman and her two unmarried sisters. Thus, for the next 14 years there was less time for Chapman to devote to her art, and she accepted no more commissions for portraits.

== Death and legacy ==
In 1929 Chapman died, at the age of 65. She was living in St Kilda with her sisters, Elinor (b. 1870) and Jessie (1868–1956) who helped her to raise her niece and nephew.

== See also ==
- National Gallery of Victoria Shaw Research Library
- National Library of Australia, file:
- State Library of Victoria, papers,
