= Jane Price =

Australian artist (1860–1948)

Jane Rebecca Price
- Born: 18 February 1860; Cheddar, Somerset, England
- Died: 24 May 1948 (aged 88); St. Kilda, Victoria, Australia
- Education: Royal College of Art
- Known for: Painting, Decorative arts

Jane Rebecca Price (18 February 1860 – 24 May 1948) was an Australian painter who was a founding member of the Melbourne Society of Women Painters and Sculptors. Two of her works have been acquired by the National Gallery of Victoria and two by the Art Gallery of South Australia. She was a close associate of members of the group of painters known as the Heidelberg school.

== Early life ==
Price was born in Cheddar, Somerset, England, on 18 February 1860. Her father, William Thomas Price, was a clergyman, her mother was Rebecca Jane Evans; she had five siblings. Price trained as an artist at the Royal College of Art (RCA) in London (then called the South Kensington Art School).

== Career ==
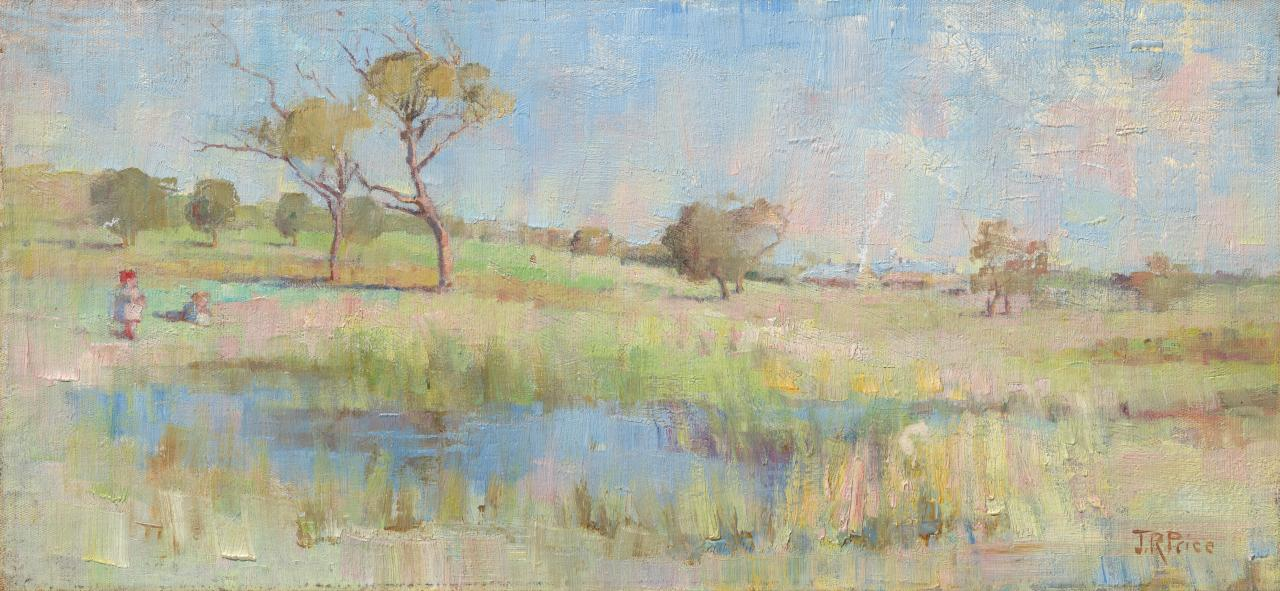
Children Playing in a Landscape, c. 1888, National Gallery of Victoria

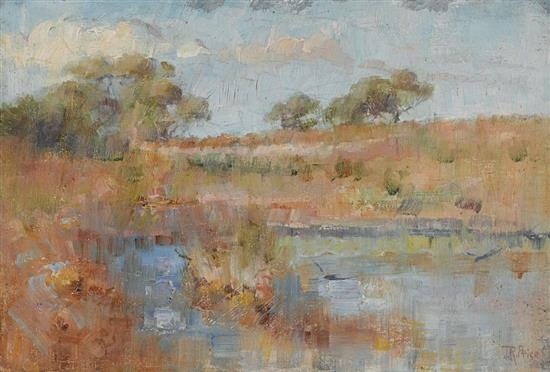
Landscape, 1890

At the age of 20, Price migrated from England to Sydney, then moved to Melbourne two years later. She returned to Sydney several times (1907–1910, 1925, 1935) but lived chiefly in Melbourne's suburbs, spending her final 13 years in St. Kilda, at the house of her friend Ina Gregory, another artist who is associated with the Heidelberg school.

Price continually painted throughout her life, but, needing an income and somewhere to live, also worked as a governess, which reduced her productivity as an artist. She was a governess for artists Alexander and Beatrix Colquhoun from 1903, and later for Frederick and Annie McCubbin. Her paintings were exhibited by the Victorian Artists Society between 1882 and 1906, and at other places in Melbourne.

Price enjoyed life-long friendship with artists who were central to the circle that came to be known as the Heidelberg school. Amongst her closest associates were Jane Sutherland, Clara Southern, Tom Roberts and Frederick McCubbin. Hammond and Peers record that Price is mentioned in a letter written by McCubbin to Roberts noting that he was pleased to see that "Janey Price did very well" in an exhibition held at McCubbin's house in Shipley St, South Yarra, in 1906. A number of her paintings were sold at the exhibition, according to Hammond and Peers.

== Death and legacy ==
Price died on 24 May 1948 at the age of 88, living in the house shared with her friend and fellow artist, Ina Gregory.

Jane Price Crescent in the Canberra suburb of Conder is named in her honour.

Since her death there have been several exhibitions that have included her work, for example:

- 1988 The Australian Impressionists: Their Origins and Influences, Lauraine Diggins, North Caulfield
- 1992 Completing the Picture: Women Artists of the Heidelberg Era, travelling exhibition curated by Artmoves
- 1993 A Century of Australian Women Artists 1840s -1940s, Deutscher Galleries, Melbourne

Her work is represented in The National Gallery of Victoria and the Art Gallery of South Australia:

- The Patch, Kallista, 1941 (inscribed on the reverse of the painting: “view from Tom Robert’s Studio”). Online. The Patch, Kallista by JR Price

- Sydney Harbour by Night, c. 1910. Online. Sydney Harbour by Night by JR Price

- A little 'un, early 1890s and Spring clouds c. 1905. Online at: A little 'un and Spring clouds

Works in Private collections:

Heidelberg, n.d., Online. Heidelberg, pastel
