= John Llewellyn Jones =

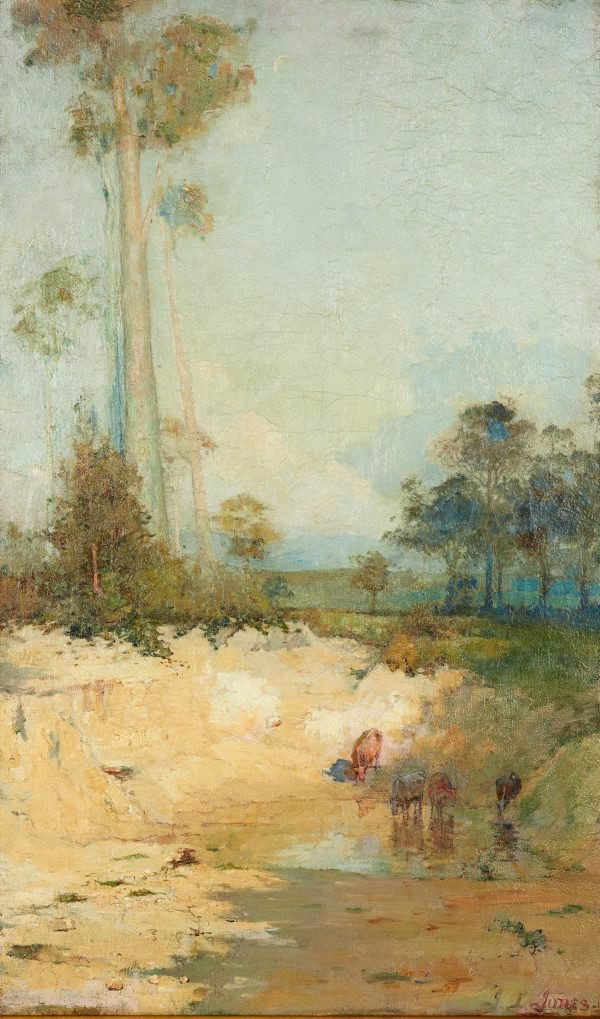
The Dry Season, 1889, Art Gallery of New South Wales

John Llewellyn Jones (1866 – 13 December 1927), often referred to as Llewellyn or J. Llewellyn Jones, was an Australian artist and photographer who was associated with the Heidelberg School art movement, also known as Australian impressionism.

== Career ==
Born and raised in Melbourne, Jones studied painting at the National Gallery of Victoria Art School under George Folingsby between 1883 and 1889. He was an early member of both the Box Hill artists' camp, established in 1885, and the Heidelberg camp, where, alongside Arthur Streeton, Charles Conder and others, he painted the Australian landscape en plein air using impressionist techniques. During this time, he was a member of the Buonarotti Club, one of Melbourne's leading bohemian arts clubs of the mid-1880s.

Streeton gifted a number of his Heidelberg works to Jones, including Impression for Golden Summer (1888), the basis of his now-iconic landscape Golden Summer, Eaglemont (1889). Jones went on to lend Impression for Golden Summer to the landmark 9 by 5 Impression Exhibition of 1889. The following year, Jones and Streeton submitted a number of their Heidelberg works to the Victorian Artists Society's winter show, which attracted the attention of Art Gallery of New South Wales trustees on visit from Sydney. Regarding the pair as "most promising young artists", they purchased both Jones' The Dry Season and Streeton's An Australian Gloaming, making them some of the first Heidelberg School works to enter a public collection. The Dry Season was later included in the 1898 Exhibition of Australian Art in London, among other works by Jones.

Living in Sydney towards the end of his life, Jones continued to paint, mostly in watercolour. He died at North Sydney Hospital on 13 December 1927 after a brief illness.

== Legacy ==
While Streeton wrote of him as a significant early proponent of plein-airism in Australia, Jones has, compared to other members of the Melbourne "artists' camps", languished in relative obscurity. Art critic James Stuart MacDonald wrote in 1958:

Llewellyn Jones is no more than a name amongst a list of painters who worked with Roberts and Conder at Eaglemont … and maybe he will never amount to much more than a name in a list: yet, for their fidelity, somebody in Australia will always hang his pictures.

In 1996, a large collection of Jones' oil paintings and watercolours were discovered and exhibited at the Tweed Regional Gallery. Titled "John Llewellyn Jones: Australia's Forgotten Painter", the exhibition later toured to other regional galleries.

Llewellyn Loop in the Canberra suburb of Conder is named after Jones.
