= Elizabeth Parsons (artist) =

English born painter, lithographer and art teacher

Elizabeth Parsons (née Warren; 27 September 1831 – 28 May 1897) was an English artist and 19th century settler of Victoria, Australia. She was the first women to be elected to the Council of the Victorian Academy of Arts.

== Early life ==
Parsons was born in Isleworth, London, the daughter of William Thomas Warren (1794-1851) and Elizabeth Keens (1794-1867). The couple married in 1820 at St Thomas Le Apostle, London, and had four sons before Elizabeth's birth in 1831.

Elizabeth attended boarding school, and later found work as a governess and then manager of a toy shop owned by her family.

Elizabeth married George Parsons (born 1830), the manager of a Marble Mine in Cornwall, on 28 October 1868. George already had two children, George and Cecil, from a previous marriage. Their first child, Adeline, was born 10 August 1869.

The Parson family emigrated to Australia on the SS Great Britain, leaving Liverpool on 19 March 1870 and arriving 15 May 1870, a voyage of 58 days. Elizabeth was pregnant at the time, and gave birth to her second child, Henry, shortly after arriving.

== Artistic career ==
Parsons originally painted under the name "E.Warren", but after her marriage exhibited as "Mrs George Parsons", although she signed her works "E.P."

While living in London Parsons was taught by Thomas Miles Richardson (1813–90) and James Duffield Harding (1797–1863). During her early life she visited a number of locations to sketch and paint the scenery, including areas of Nottinghamshire, Derbyshire, Wales, Devon and Cornwall as well as at Strathclyde in Scotland. In 1864 she journeyed to Fontainebleau in France.

When Parsons arrived in Australia she soon began to exhibit her works. Her earliest show was on 1 December 1870, in an exhibition of "Works by Victorian Artists" at the Melbourne Public Library. A review in the Argus reported that "In the watercolour department there are no better landscapes than those painted by Mrs Parsons."

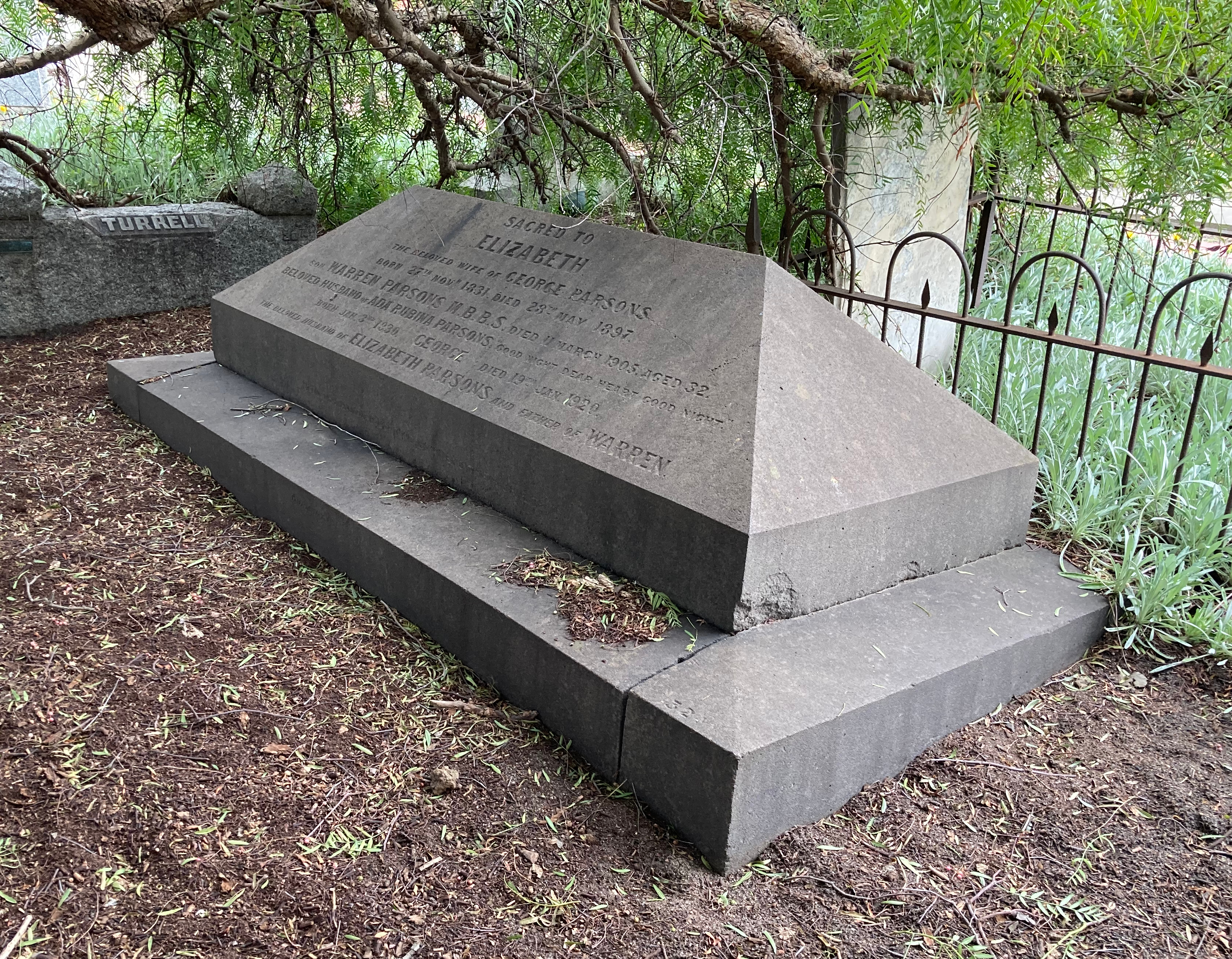
Parsons' grave at St Kilda Cemetery

On 3 December 1874 Parsons was elected to the Council of the Victorian Academy of Art, becoming its first female council member, despite opposition from other members. She was an active member of Melbourne's notoriously bohemian Buonarotti Club founded in 1883, and after its demise in 1887 founded a similar club in 1889, known as Stray Leaves, comprising several other ex-Buonarotti members.

== Death ==
Parsons died on 28 May 1897. She is buried at St Kilda Cemetery.

== Selected works ==
Sketches of St. Kilda by Elizabeth Parsons, Pictures Collection, State Library Victoria

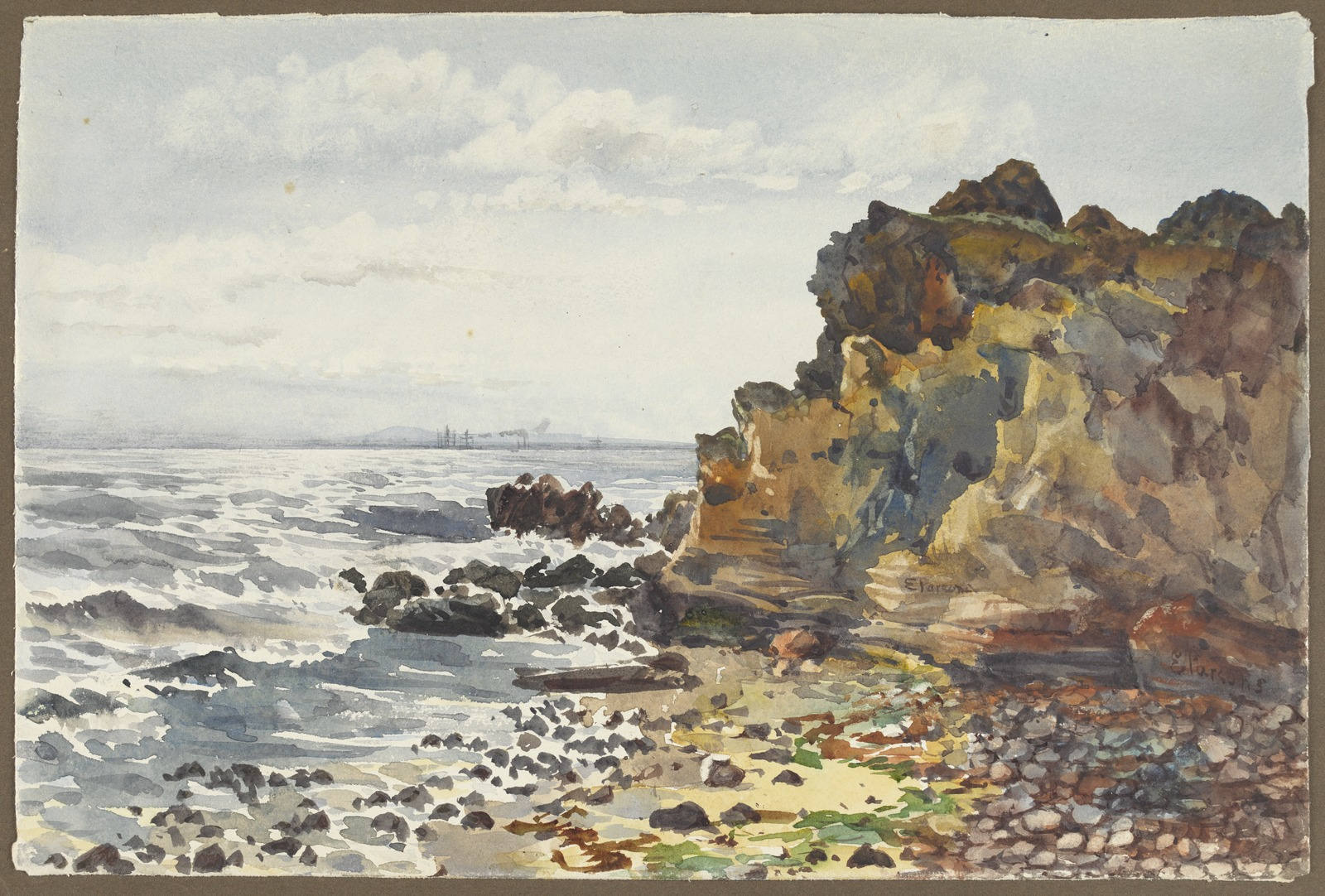
Red Bluff St Kilda (Point Ormond)

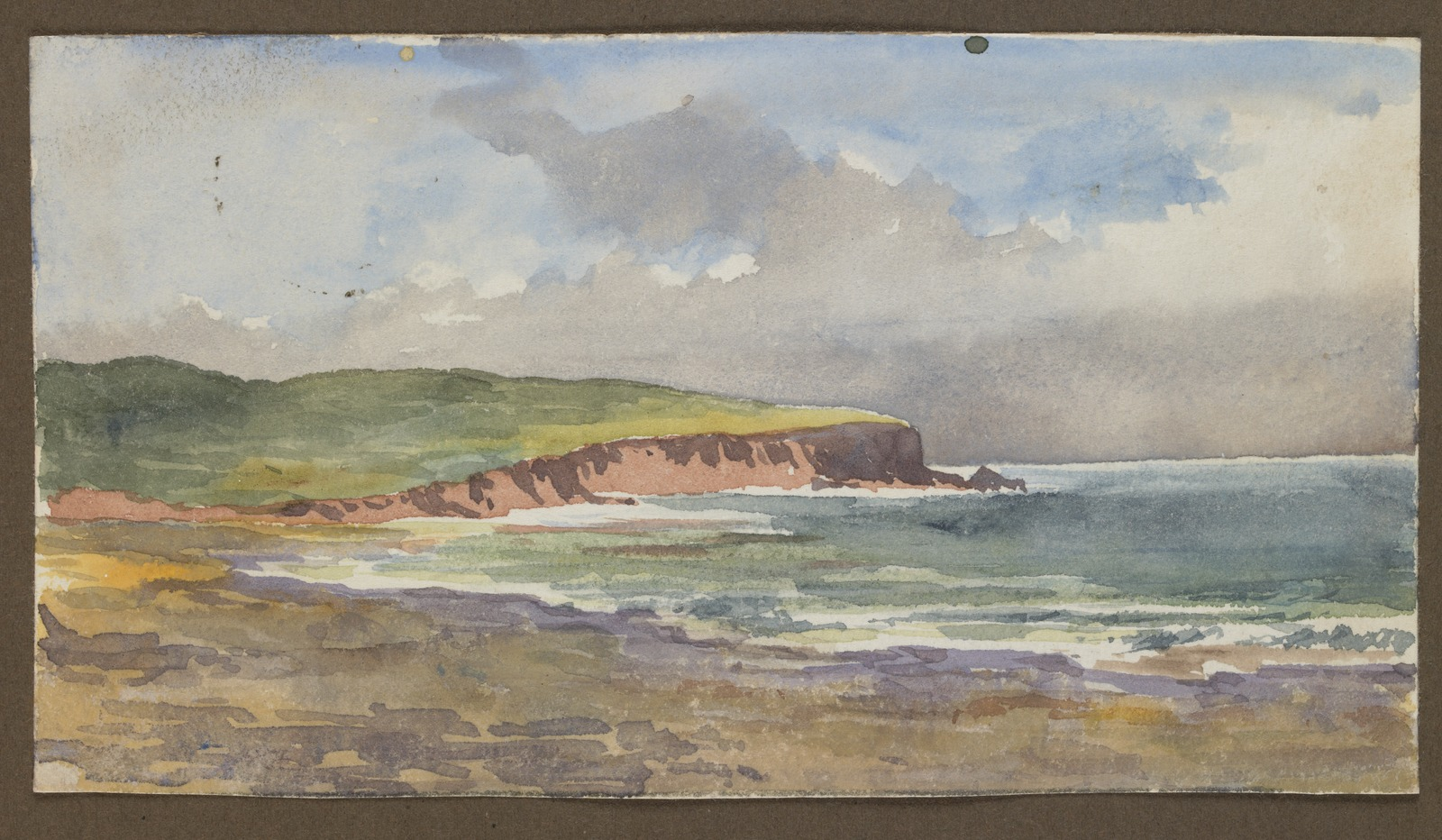
Red Bluff, St. Kilda

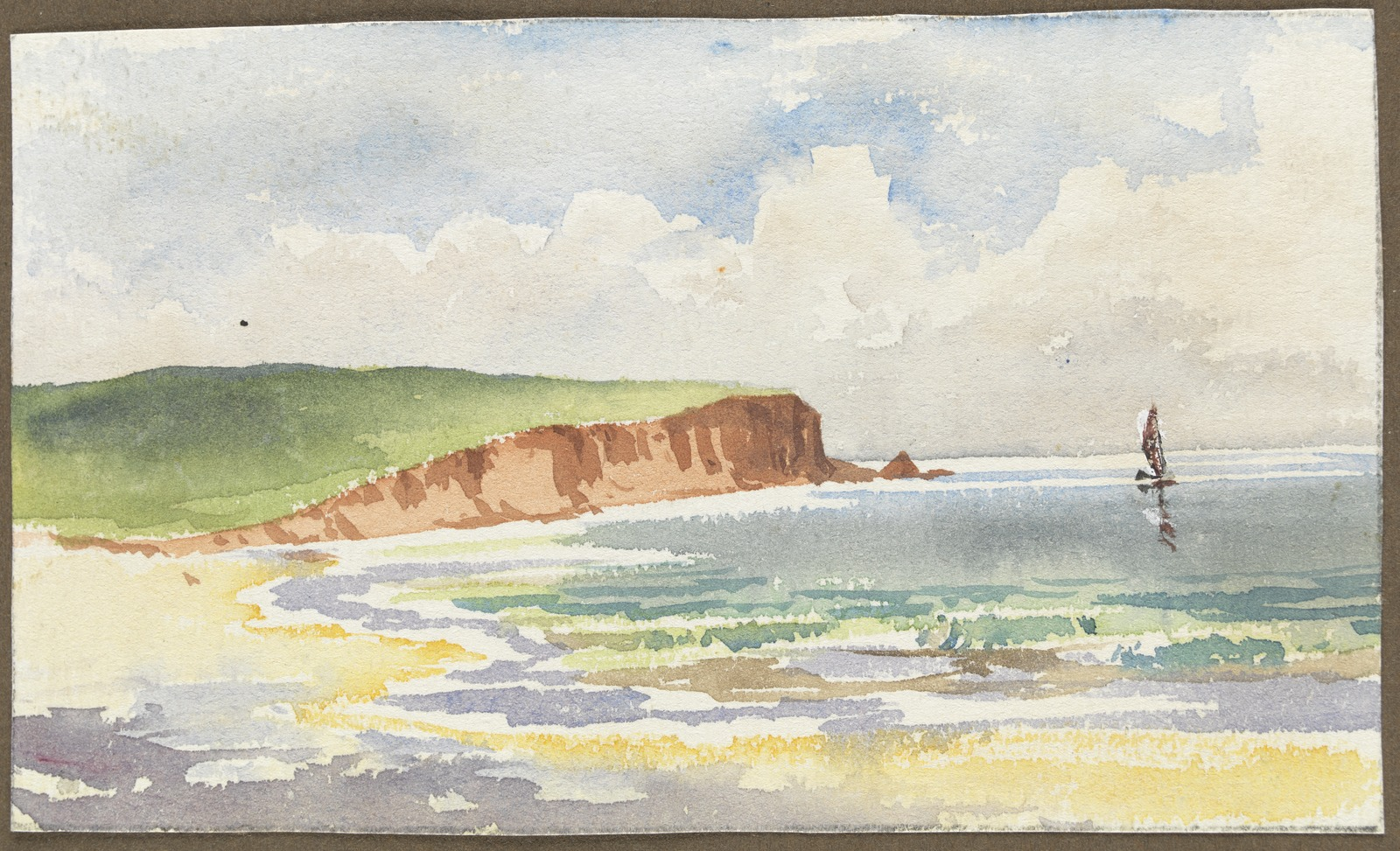
Red Bluff St. Kilda

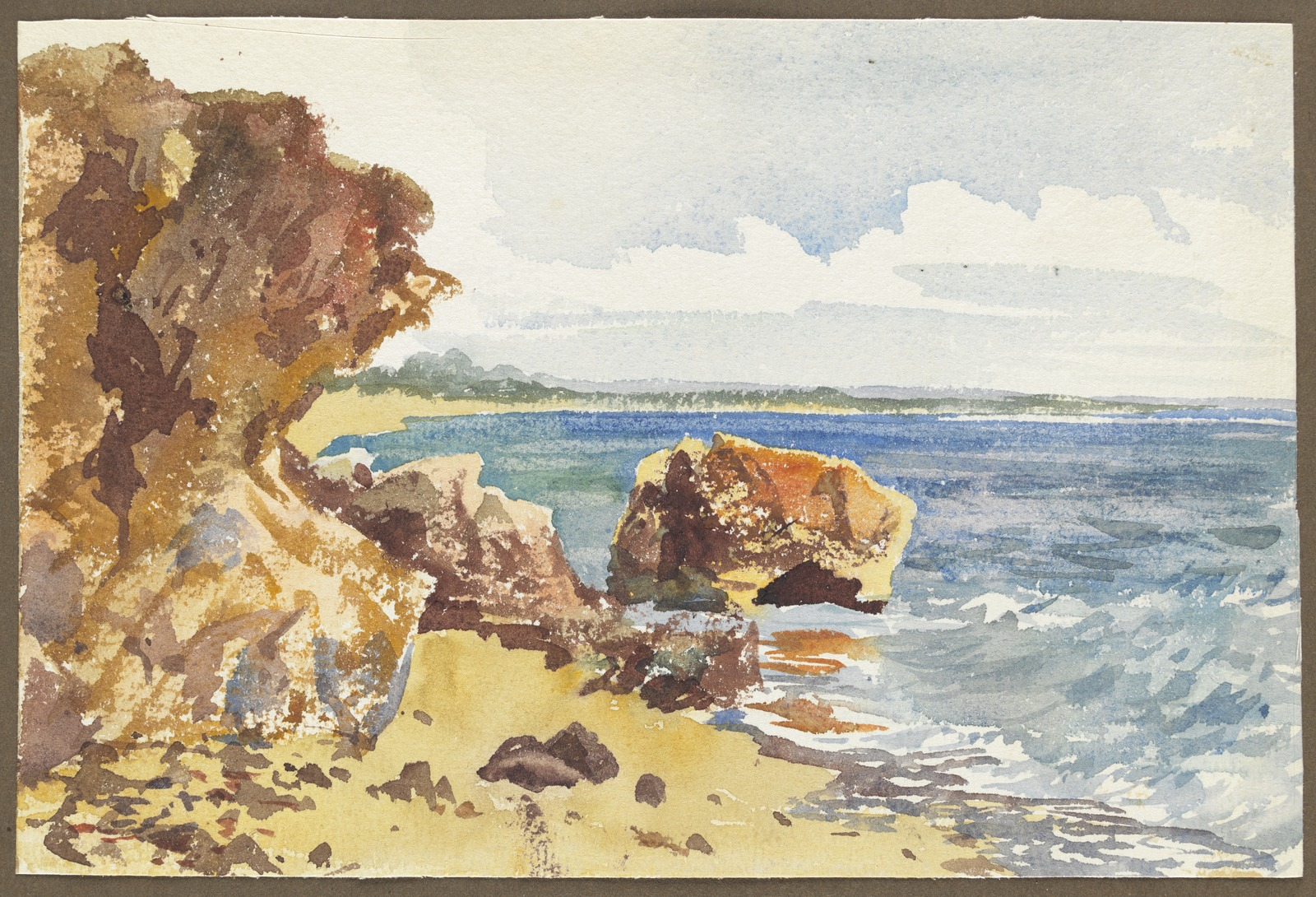
St Kilda Red Bluff looking towards Brighton

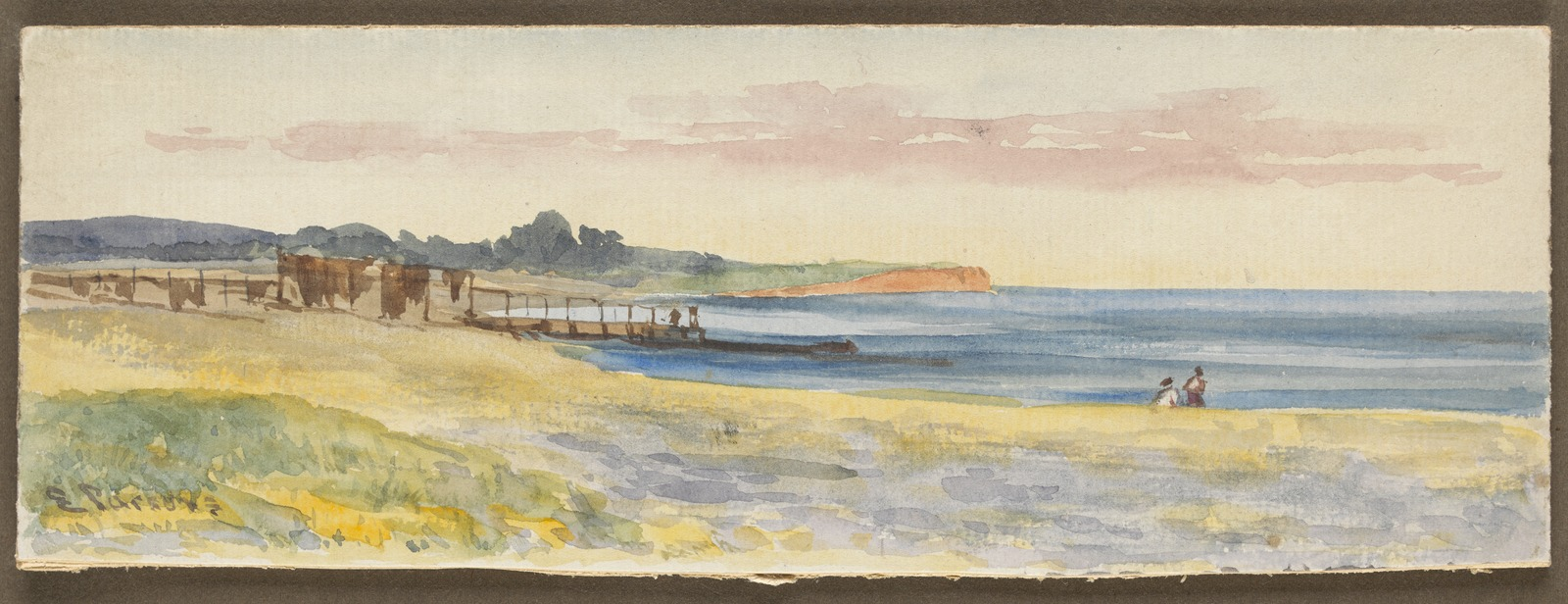
St Kilda Beach near Elwood
