= Jane Sutherland =

Australian landscape painter

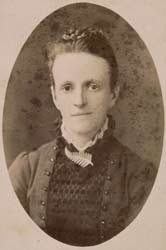
- Born: 16 December 1853; New York City, USA
- Died: 5 July 1928 (aged 74); Melbourne, Australia
- Known for: Painting
- Movement: Heidelberg School

Jane Sutherland (26 December 1853 – 25 July 1928) was an Australian landscape painter who was part of the pioneering plein-air movement in Australia, and a member of the Heidelberg School. Her advocacy to advance the professional standing of female artists during the late nineteenth century was also a notable achievement.

== Early life ==
Jane Sutherland was born in New York to Scottish parents, her mother was an engraver Jane Smith-Sutherland and her father George Sutherland, a carver of ill health; the family emigrated to Sydney in 1864 and moved to Melbourne in 1870. The Sutherland family soon became an important part in the formation of Melbourne's cultural influence in Australia. Uncommon at the time, Sutherland had the support and encouragement from her family to pursue a career as an artist. Due to the support of her family, Sutherland was able to live comfortably as an unmarried, working woman.

In the late nineteenth century, there were two contrasting movements concerning women's education. The first being the view that a woman's role and purpose was reproduction; their importance was valued by their maternal care.

The second view came from the Australian women's suffrage movement, which not only called for the female right to vote, but the need for equal education to access confidence, achievement and employment. This included the visual arts and gradually saw the inclusion of women into the National Gallery School. The intrepid leader that was Sutherland, had enrolled as early as 1871, a good 14 years before the Women's Suffrage Society was formed in Melbourne. Unlike fields such as medicine, the study of visual arts was considered an easier area to transition into as it was already considered a suitable hobby for upper-class women. The likelihood of female artist being equal to a male artist in commission, exhibitions and respect was harder to gain.

== Career ==
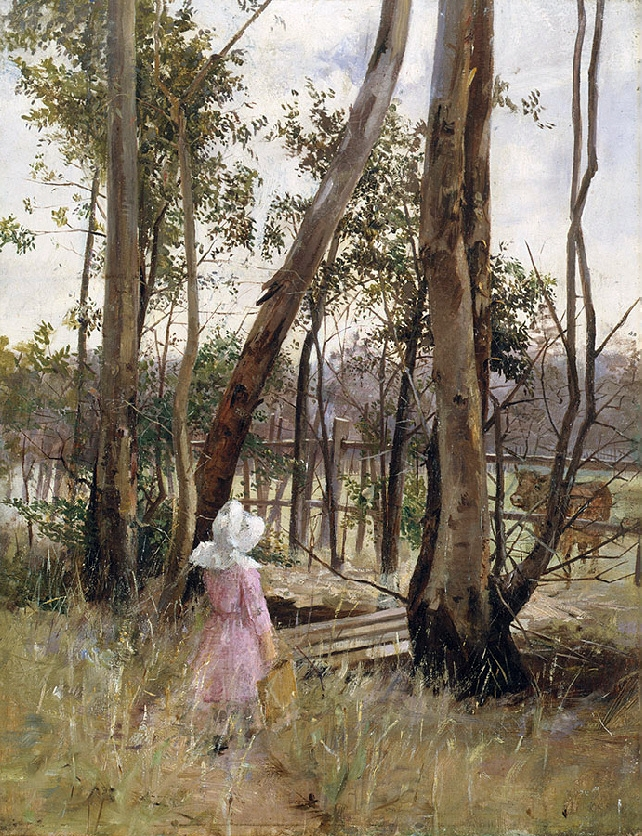
Obstruction, Box Hill, 1887

From 1878, Sutherland exhibited at the Victorian Academy of Arts, then with the Australian Artists’ Association, and with the Victorian Artists’ Society (from 1888) until 1911. By the standards of the time, she was held in high regard for her artistry, which was supported by the fact she was reviewed on the same terms as male artists, rather than grouped in a general remark of works by lady artists in an exhibition. Critics justified the distinction due to Sutherland's landscapes being a comparable to the strong form of male artist's work. In 1884 she became one of the first women members of the Buonarotti Club and, as Mead shown, membership formed relationships between Sutherland, Withers, Roberts, McCubbin, Abrahams and others leading to them painting together in plein air camps as the Heidelberg School of artists.

Sutherland was the leading female artist in the group of Melbourne painters who worked outside the studio; she took plein-air sketching trips to the outlying rural districts of Alphington, Templestowe and Box Hill with her male contemporaries of the Heidelberg School. Unlike her contemporaries, Tom Roberts, Arthur Streeton and Charles Conder, Sutherland, as a female, was unable to stay with the men at the campsites overnight, and instead made day journeys to the campsites.

From 1888, Sutherland shared a studio for teaching with artist Clara Southern. The studio at Grosvenor Chambers in Collins Street, Melbourne, was considered a centre for the Heidelberg School with Tom Roberts and Jane Price later securing studios there. Jane Sutherland and Clara Southern both created works for 9 by 5 Impression Exhibition held in Melbourne, 1889. The exhibition held many works by artists from the Heidelberg School and is considered the beginning of the style known as Australian Impressionism. However, Sutherland's and Southern's works were not exhibited. There is a continuing debate, highlighted by art historians Juliet Peers and Humphrey McQueen, if the exclusion of Sutherland and Southern was due to gender roles of the time or merely that their work did not fit the curator's, Elsie Goode, overall vision. In 1900 Sutherland and May Vale were the first women elected as Councillors of the Victorian Artists’ Society. During her years of active work, she was valued for her efforts in the visual arts scene of Melbourne.

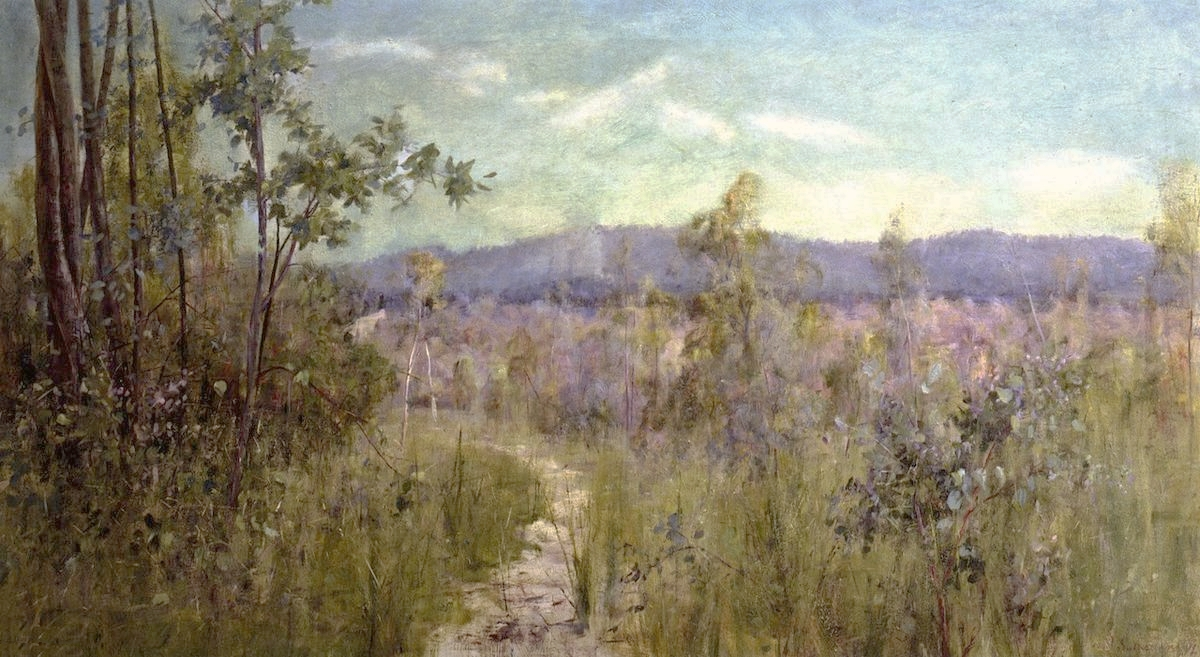
To the Dandenongs, 1888

Sutherland's body of work mainly focus on Australian landscapes with the inclusion of women and children interacting with nature. Narrative is suggestive in her works as she leaves an impression of the land and her figures turn away from the viewer. Despite her efforts and success, Sutherland found difficulties in being considered a serious and professional artist. Sutherland was forced to price her paintings at a tenth of the value of her male peers. In one example from 1894 exhibition, Sutherland's work To the Dandenong asking price was eighteen guineas, while David Davies sold his piece Moonrise for seventy-five pounds.

== Illness and death ==
In the early years of the 1900s, Sutherland suffered from a serious stroke and became fully reliant upon the care of her brother, William Sutherland. With William's assistance for mobility, Sutherland was able to continue painting and exhibiting her work as well as teach art to a new generation. However, the impact of her illness can be seen by the diminishing the size of her works, from large canvases to small pastels.

Following William's death in 1911, Sutherland was forced to retire and remained so until her death in 1928. Unable to paint, it was during these years that she was gradually forgotten during the turn of the century. By the time of her death on the 28th of July, there was little to no public acknowledgment.

== Legacy ==
Jane Sutherland was an important figure in a generation of Australian women who chose to pursue a career in art over marriage and creating a family. Her niece, Ruth Sutherland, was a painter. While little is known of her personality and motivations, Sutherland's art now resides in national institutions for continuous interpretation.

Jane Sutherland Circuit in the Canberra suburb of Conder is named in her honour.

== Awards ==
Wallen Prize, National Gallery School, Annual Students’ Exhibition, 1883

== Representation ==
Art Gallery of South Australia

Ballarat Fine Art Gallery

LaTrobe Library Picture Collection

National Gallery of Australia

National Gallery of Victoria

Newcastle Region Art Gallery

Northern Territory Museum and Art Gallery

State Library of Victoria, Melbourne

University of Melbourne Art Museum

== Gallery of works ==
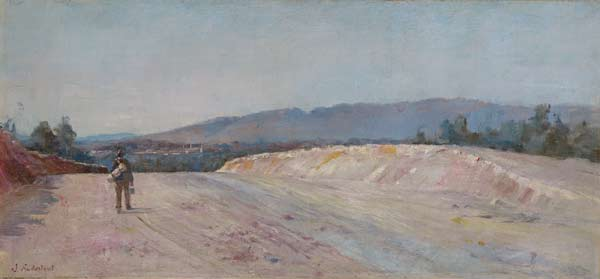
On the Last Tramp, 1888, private collection

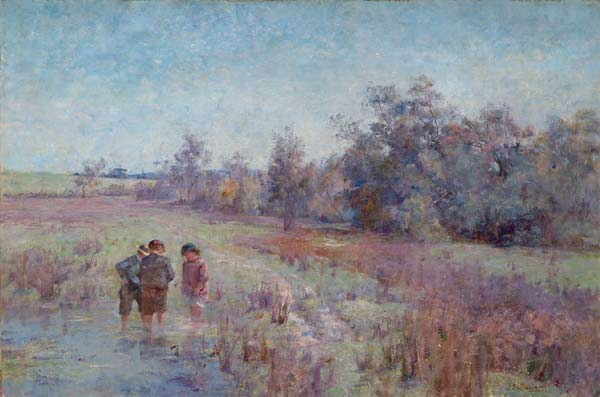
Field Naturalists, 1896, National Gallery of Victoria

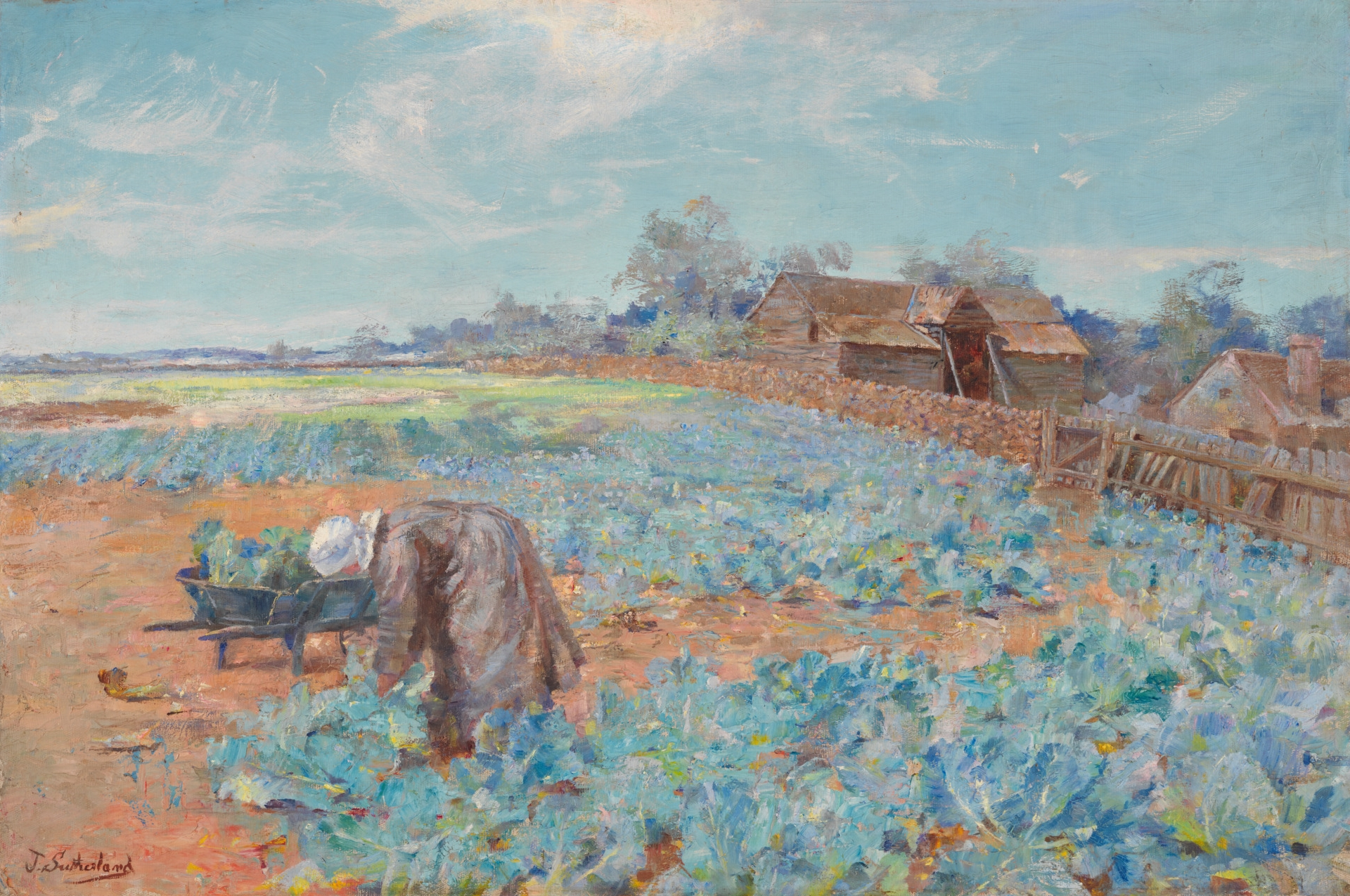
A Cabbage Garden, 1896, National Gallery of Australia

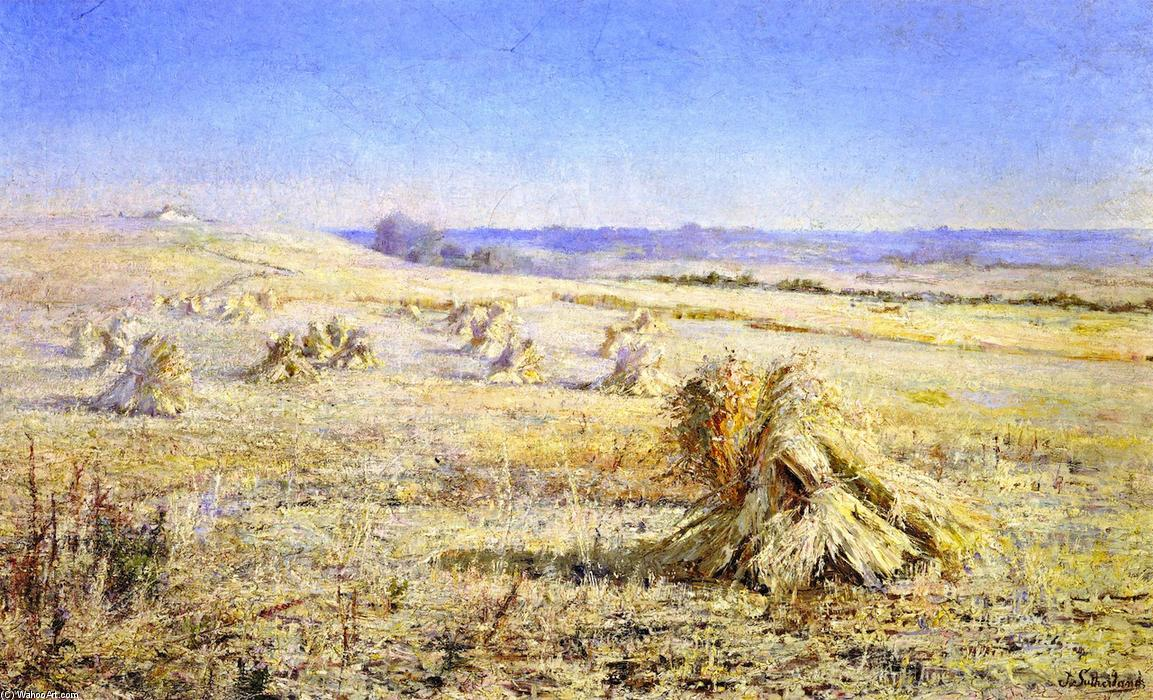
Harvest Field, 1897, private collection
