= David Davies (artist) =

Australian artist

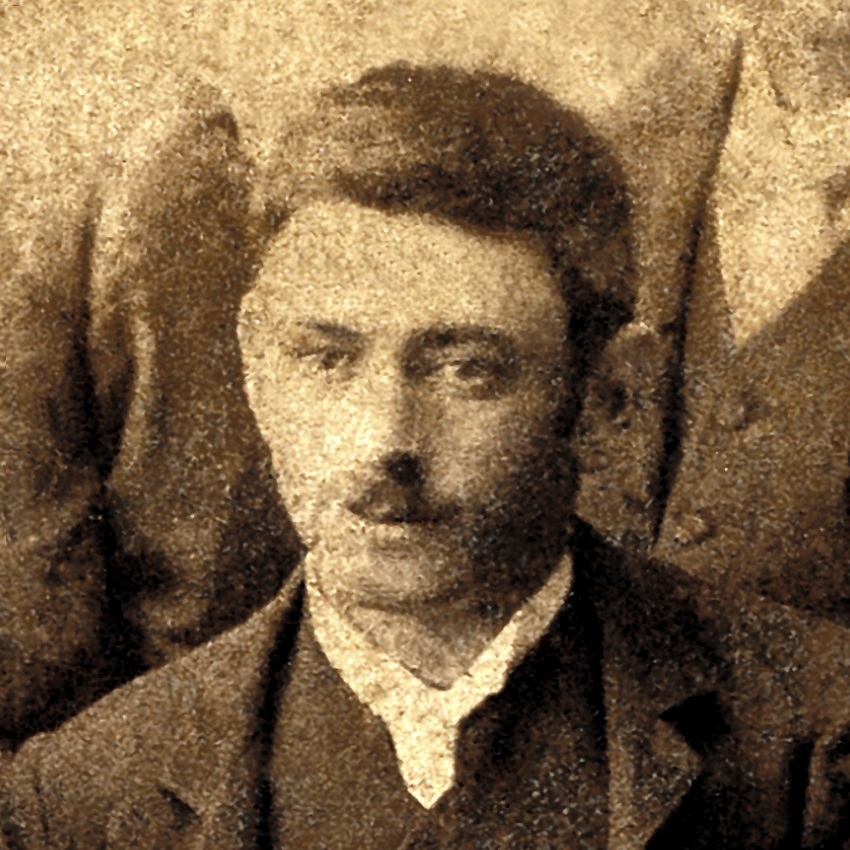
- Born: 21 May 1864; Ballarat, Victoria, Australia
- Died: 26 March 1939 (aged 74)
- Movement: Heidelberg School

David Davies (21 May 1864 – 26 March 1939) was an Australian artist who was associated with the Heidelberg School, the first significant Western art movement in Australia.

== Biography ==
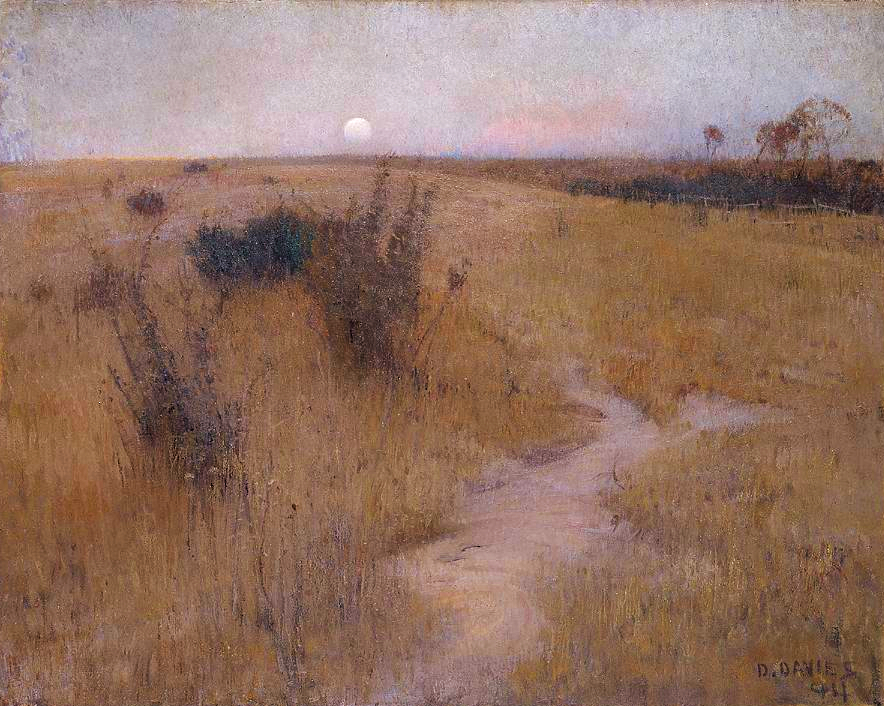
Moonrise (1894, National Gallery of Victoria) is characteristic of Davies' nocturnal paintings.

Born and raised in Ballarat, Victoria, Davies attended art classes at the Ballarat School of Mines and Industries. He subsequently attended the National Gallery of Victoria Art School in Melbourne, studying under Frederick McCubbin and the conservative George Folingsby from 1886 to 1890. During this time, he joined the Buonarotti Club amongst other members of the Heidelberg School, and often visited Arthur Streeton, Charles Conder and other plein air painters at their Mount Eagle "artists' camp". The artists stayed in a farmhouse on the property owned by Charles Davies, the brother of David Davies' future wife.

In 1890, Davies submitted his painting Under the Burden and Heat of the Day to the National Gallery School's Travelling Scholarship competition, but lost. Nonetheless, private collector James Oddie purchased the painting and later sold it to the Art Gallery of Ballarat. Davies used the funds from this purchase to travel to Europe. While there, he studied under Jean-Paul Laurens in Paris, and later joined the St Ives School, an artists' colony in Cornwall.

Returning to Melbourne in 1893, Davies moved to the rural suburb of Templestowe, where he began painting the local scenery en plein air during the evening. These nocturnal landscapes, many of them simply named Moonrise, are among his best-known works, and can be found in the collections of many of Australia's major art museums, including the Art Gallery of South Australia, the National Gallery of Australia and the National Gallery of Victoria. Moonlight was a favourite theme found in his works. He completed a series depicting the moon rising over the Yarra Valley.

Early in 1896, Davies and his family moved to Cheltenham, Melbourne.

Davies held a one-man exhibition in Melbourne in May 1926 which was reported to have been successful.

In 1932 Davies moved to Looe, Cornwall, England, where he died on 26 March 1939.

== Legacy ==
A major exhibition of Davies' work, organised by the Art Gallery of Ballarat, toured a number of Australia's state galleries in 1985–86.

Davies Close in the Canberra suburb of Conder is named in his honour.

== Selected paintings ==
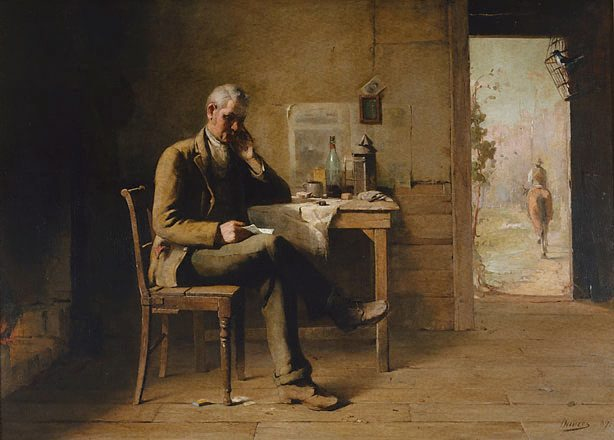
From a Distant Land, 1889, Art Gallery of New South Wales

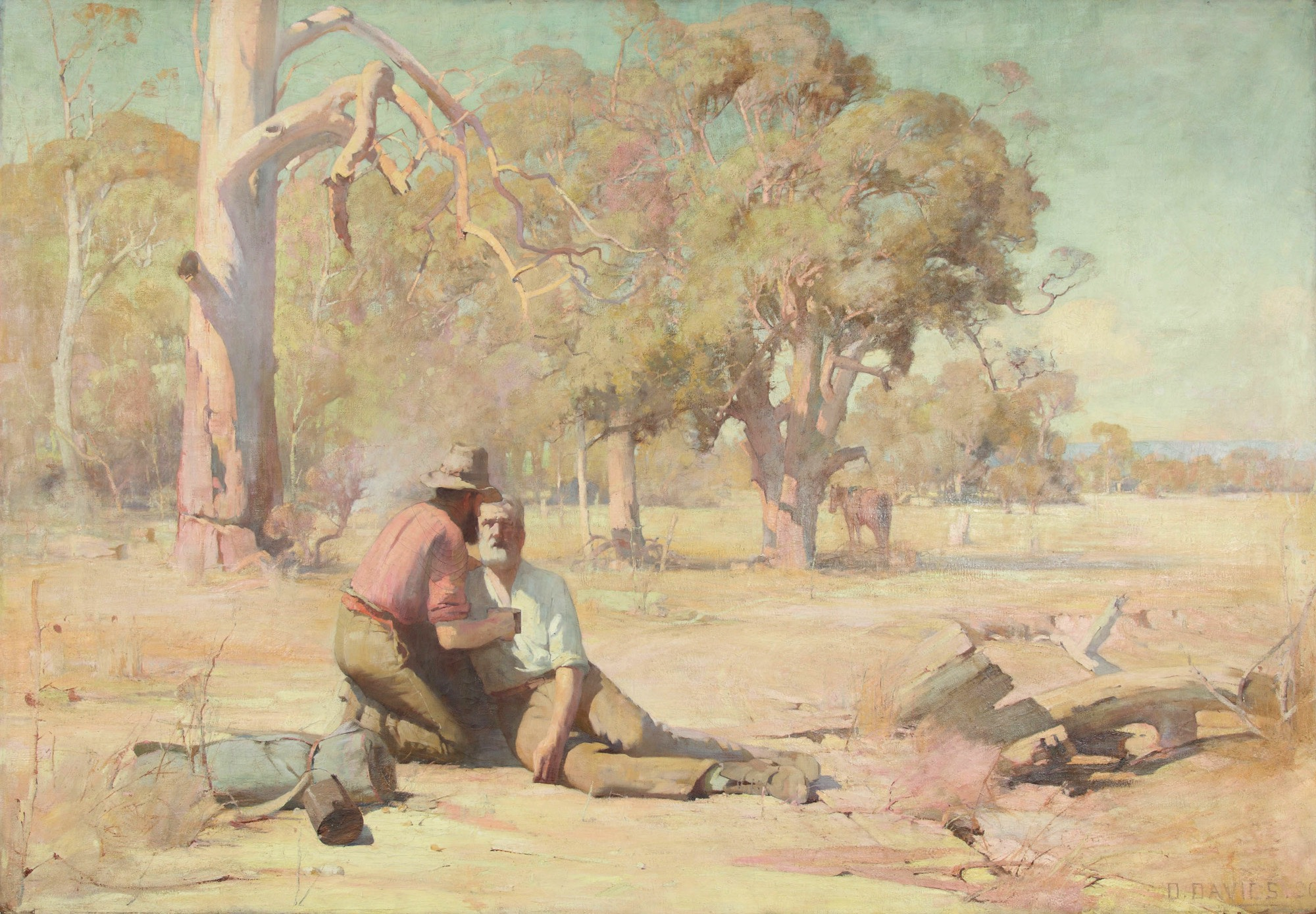
Under the Burden and Heat of the Day, 1890, Art Gallery of Ballarat

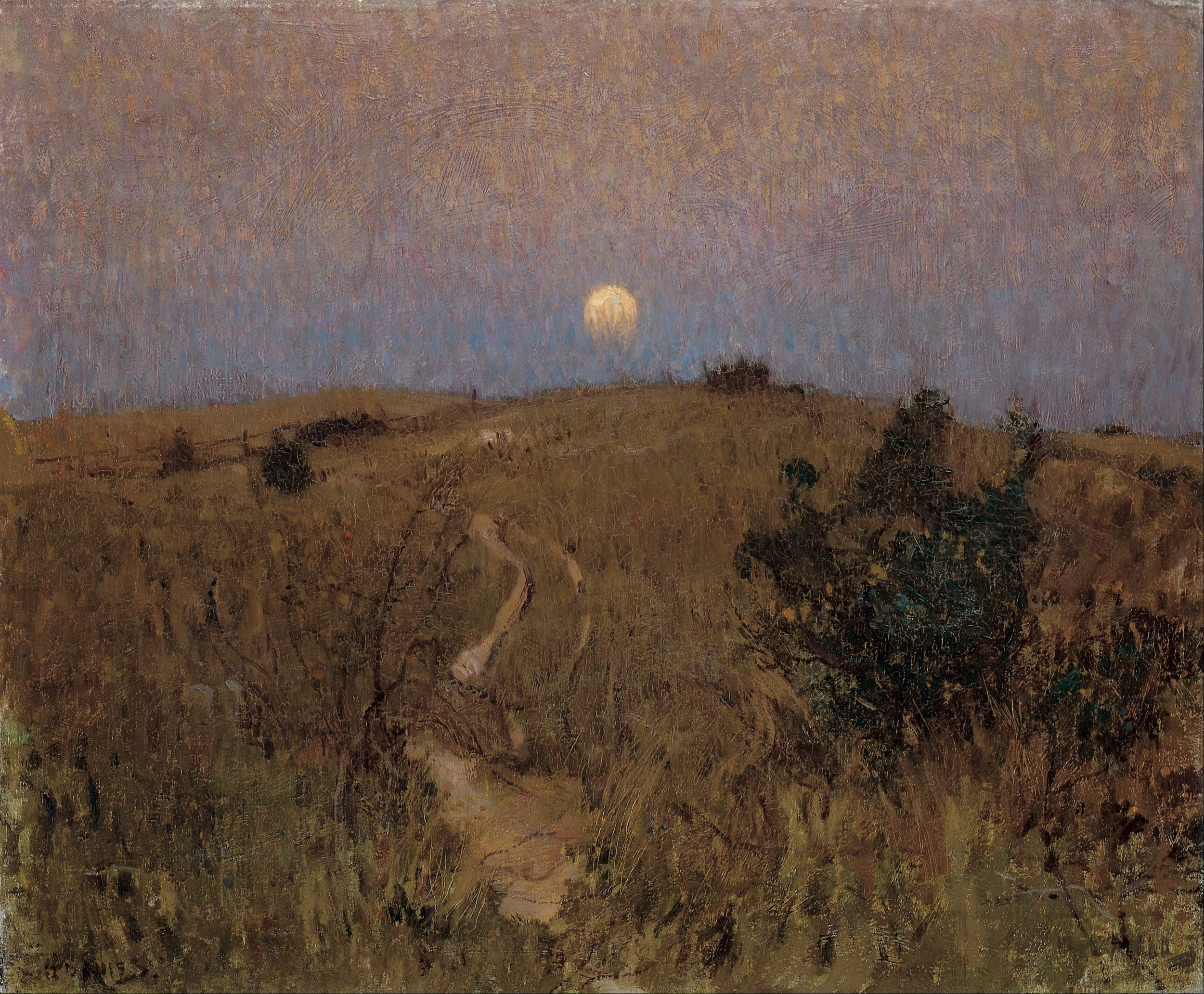
Moonrise, 1893, Art Gallery of South Australia

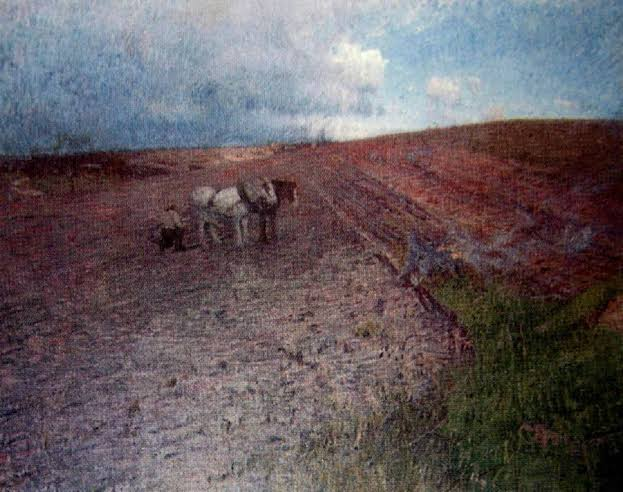
The Season of Storm, Stress and Toil, 1895, private collection
