= Abbey Altson =

British painter (1866–1948)

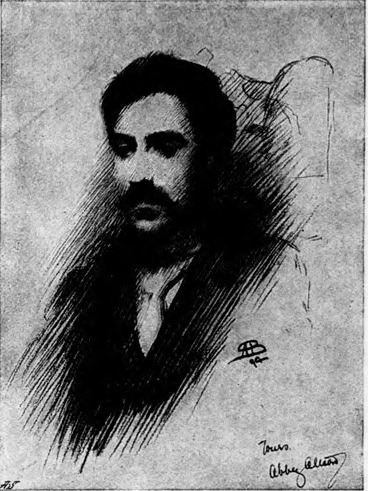
- Born: 21 August 1866; Middlesbrough, England
- Died: 7 November 1948 (aged 82); New York City, US
- Education: National Gallery of Victoria Art School
- Known for: Painting

Abbey Altson (21 August 1866 – 7 November 1948), also Abby, Aby or Abe Altson, who may have been born Abraham Altson, was a British painter.

== Biography ==
Altson was born in on 21 August 1866, in Middlesbrough, the only child of Ethel Levi (née Hatrick) and Isaac Altson (Altschul) and travelled to Australia in the early 1880s. He joined the bohemian Buonarotti Club (1883–87) as one of its youngest members and received encouragement from senior artists. He studied at the National Gallery School from 1885 to 1890, and in 1890, he was awarded its Travelling Scholarship. Altson's winning painting was named Flood Sufferings and gained attention through its connection to the recent flood disaster of Bourke and other towns on the Darling River. He went to Paris the following year and spent the rest of his life overseas, often traveling between England and India, and migrating to the US in 1939.

Altson along with Rupert Bunny and Max Meldrum studied at the Académie Julian, Paris under Jean Paul Laurens who was highly respected teacher. He also exhibited at the Allied Artists Association in London in 1908. Australian exhibitors in 1908 exhibition included Altson, George Bell, Rupert Bunny & Thea Proctor.

His younger brother, Myer Daniel Altson, won the Travelling Scholarship in 1902.

== Career ==
Altson was a successful painter who after winning the 1890 National Gallery of Victoria Travelling Scholarship, moved to London. The winners of the scholarship were required to paint 2 copies of old masters and one original. Altson chose to copy 2 portraits, Van Dyck's Portrait of a Lady of Rank with her daughter from the Louvre, followed by Rembrandt's An Old Man from London's National Gallery. Altson exhibited in Société des Artistes Français in 1892, 1893 and 1896.

== Legacy ==
Alston's work featured in the National Gallery of Victoria traveling exhibition Golden Summers, 30 October 1985 – 27 January 1986.

== Works ==
- Flood Sufferings (1890)
- Meditation (1896)
- The Golden Age (1893)
- Inspiration (1899)
- Idyll of the Sea (1896 )
- Songs of the Forest
