= James Stirling (botanist) =

Australian botanist and geologist (1852–1909)

James Stirling (born January 1852 in Geelong – died 1909) was an Australian botanist and geologist. The standard author abbreviation J.Stirl. is used to indicate this person as the author when citing a botanical name.

Stirling was a son of Peter Stirling ( – 7 May 1865) and Mrs Stirling-Miller (1834 – 25 June 1906)
