= Clara Southern =

Australian artist (1860–1940)

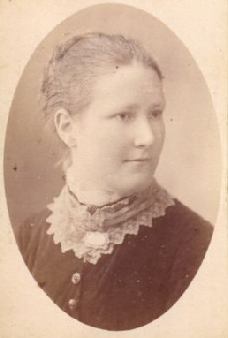
- Born: 3 October 1860; Kyneton, Victoria, Australia
- Died: 15 December 1940 (aged 80); Melbourne, Victoria, Australia
- Known for: Painting
- Spouse: John Arthur Flinn (m. 1905)

Clara Southern (3 October 1860 – 15 December 1940) was an Australian artist associated with the Heidelberg School, also known as Australian Impressionism. She was active between the years 1883 and her death in 1940. Southern was nicknamed "Panther" because of her height, red hair, and overall lithe beauty.

== Biography ==
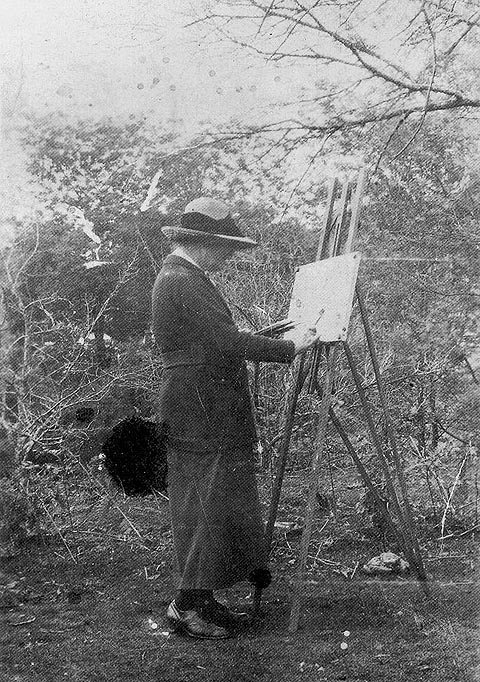
The artist painting at her home in Warrandyte

Southern was born in Kyneton, Victoria, in 1860, the eldest of six children. She was the daughter of local timber merchant and farmer John Southern and farmer Jane Elliott. From 1883 to 1887, Southern studied at the School of Design, National Gallery of Victoria under Oswald Rose Campbell and at the National Gallery of Victoria Art School under George Folingsby and Frederick McCubbin.

During her studies she joined the Buonarotti Club, a bohemian society of writers, painters and musicians to which other members of the Heidelberg School belonged. She is credited by some as 'among the first women to be elected' to it in 1886, though several other female artists were already members, and amateur poet and painter Alice Brotherton had been the first woman elected to the Club in 1883, followed by several other important women artists such as Jane Sutherland and May Vale, who both joined in 1884.

Southern was a member of the Victorian Artists Society, the Australian Art Association, the Melbourne Society of Women Painters and Sculptors, the Twenty Melbourne Painters, and the Lyceum Club. Paving the way for women's involvement in the arts, Southern was the first female member of the Australian Artists' Association.

When in Melbourne Southern shared a studio at Grosvenor Chambers, 9 Collins Street, with Jane Sutherland and Tom Roberts from 1888. She taught art classes from her studio, and regularly joined her Heidelberg School colleagues on plein air painting trips to Heidelberg and Eaglemont.

== Warrandyte ==
By 1908 Southern had established an artistic community of younger landscape painters at Warrandyte, a township on the Yarra about 30 kilometres from Melbourne. The community included Penleigh Boyd and Harold Herbert. Her teacher and mentor Walter Withers often visited her in Warrandyte to paint the landscape. Her residence at cottage 'Blythe Bank' in Warrandyte was integral to the development of the artistic community there, with regular visits from the McCubbins and Colquhouns, and Jo Sweatman becoming her neighbour at 'Kipsy.' Many of her works capture the spirit of the area, such as 'Evensong' and 'A Cool Corner', and she encouraged many a young artist to visit her studio there. At one point she was regarded as the eminent female landscape artist in Melbourne.

On 9 November 1905, Southern married local miner John Arthur Flinn at St. John's Anglican Church in Blackburn. Together they built a cottage, and later a studio, at Blythe Bank, Warrandyte. Even after her marriage, Southern continued to exhibit under her own name.

An Old Bee Farm, held by the National Gallery of Victoria is one of her better known works. It was one of 56 paintings included in Lloyd O'Neil's Classic Australian Paintings, and was used as the cover illustration for Kay Schaffer's 1988 book Women and the Bush: Forces of Desire in the Australian Cultural Tradition.

Clara was also supportive of charity and relief efforts, supporting Violet Teague and her sister Una in an exhibition for the Hermannsburg Mission Water Supply in Central Australia. Bushfires were a devastating risk in her township of Warrandyte, and she contributed to the Artists' Bushfire Relief Fund Exhibition. Unfortunately some time after her death, her beloved cottage 'Blythe Bank' was lost to bushfires.

Miss Clara Southern (Mrs J. Flinn) is a sweet and original singer of the Australian bush in colour, which, by the most skilful use of her pigments, she realises in all its beauty and charm, its majestic silences, its harmonies, and those mysterious distances we all know and feel when in its midst. We can almost hear the wind sighing and sobbing through her trees and that furtive movement of life beneath the beautiful undergrowth that trembles in her foregrounds. Her landscapes are truly poems, full of sentiment and feeling, and that artistic reticence so seldom met with, which never allows nature to be for one moment oppressed or overstepped, or the note forced under any pretence.-'A Lyrical Painter', Kyneton Guardian, 14 March 1914

Southern died in Melbourne on 15 December 1940.

Southern Close in the Canberra suburb of Chisholm is named in her honour.

== Selected works ==
Oil paintings by Clara Southern

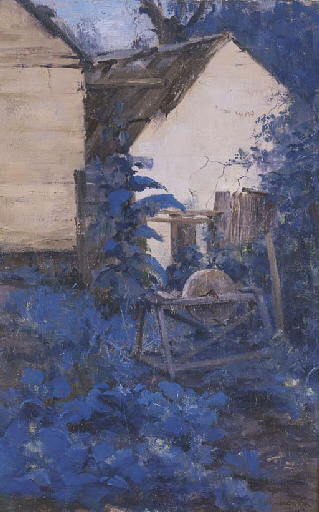
The Back of the Barn, Private collection

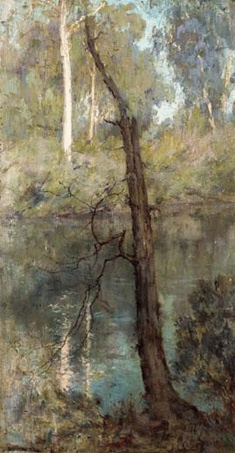
The Yarra at Warrandyte, Private collection

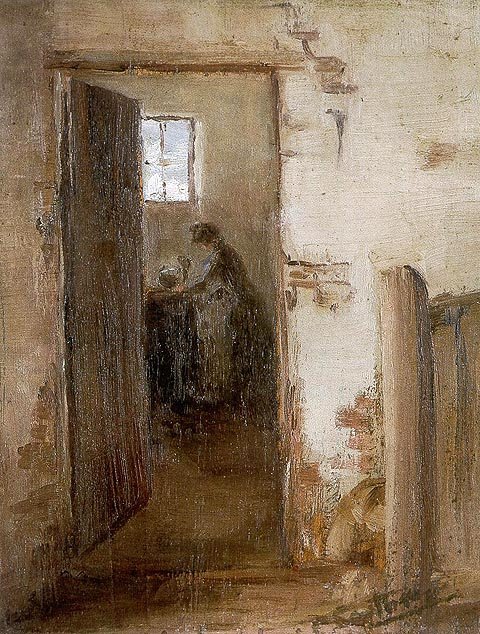
The Kitchen, Private collection

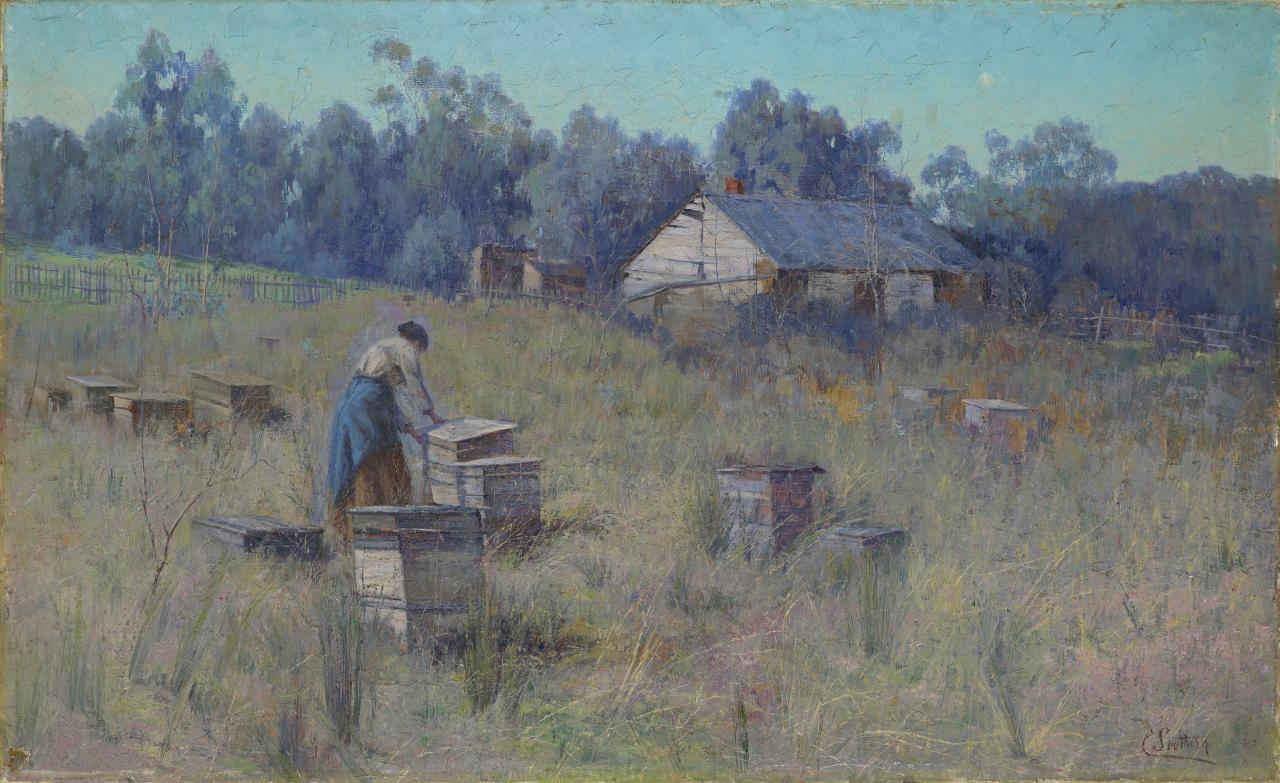
Old Bee Farm, National Gallery of Victoria

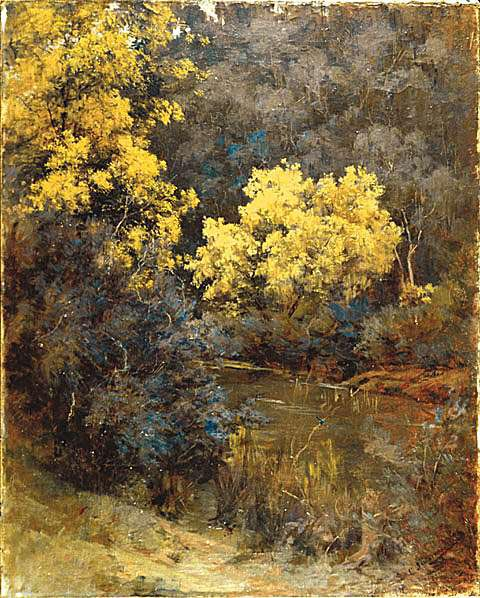
A Cool Corner, Art Gallery of Ballarat

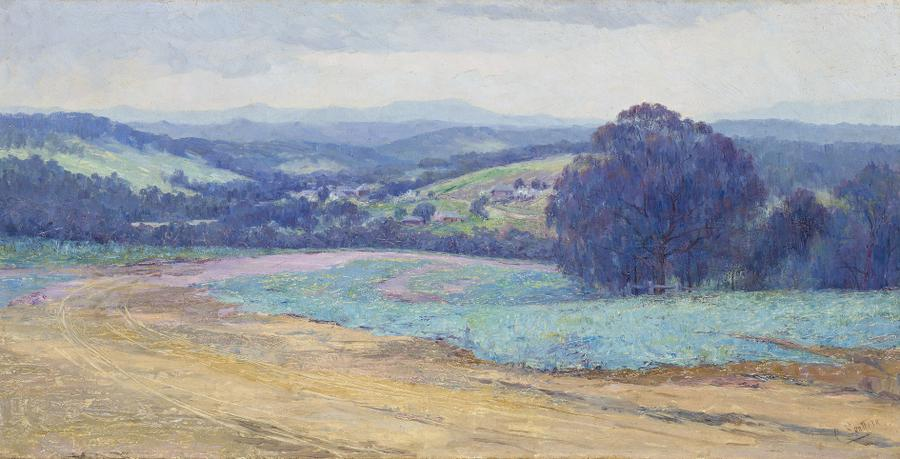
The Road to Warrandyte, Private collection

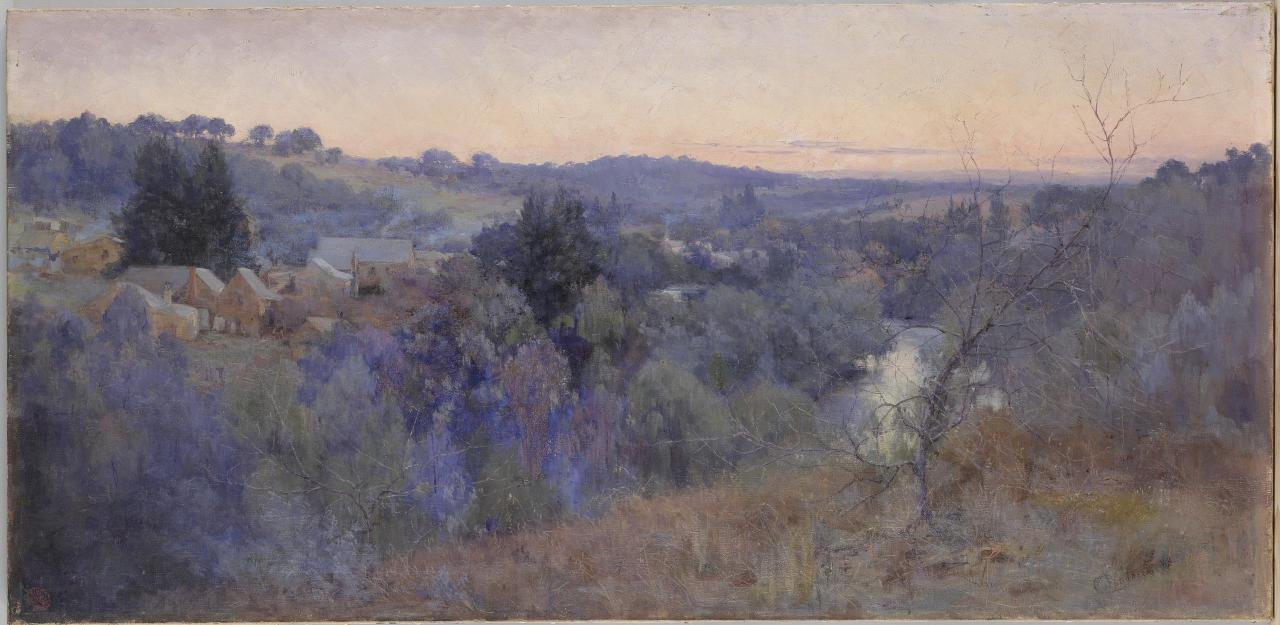
Evensong, National Gallery of Victoria

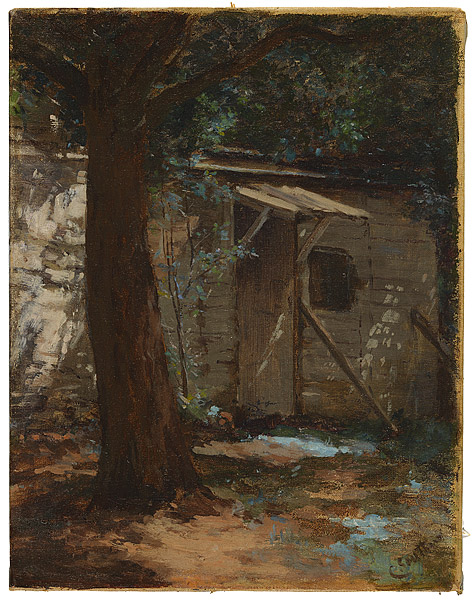
The old shed, National Gallery of Australia

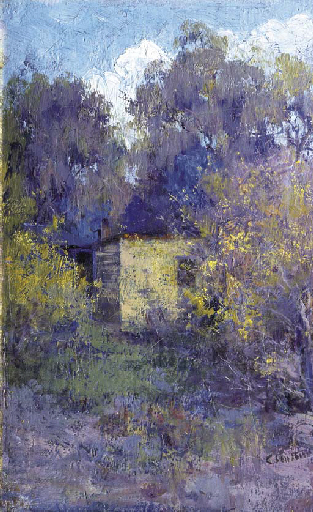
Landscape with Cottage, Private collection

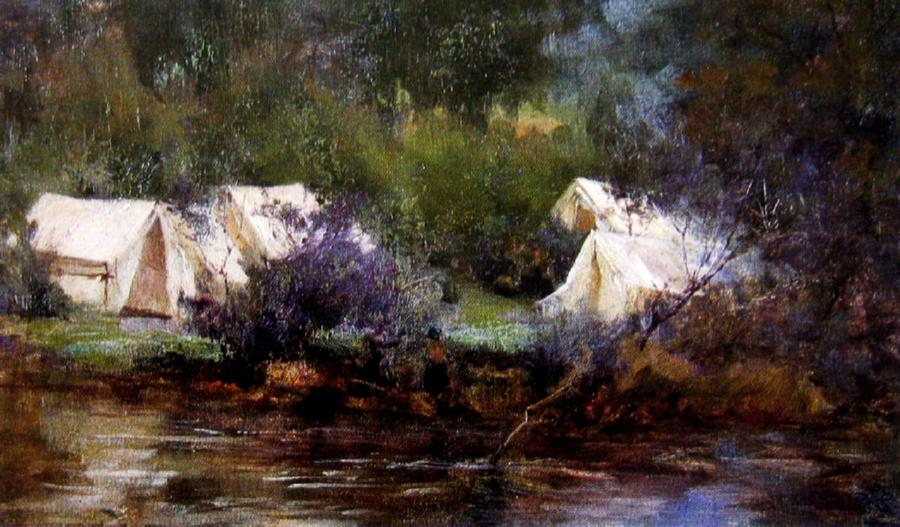
Bush Camp, Private collection

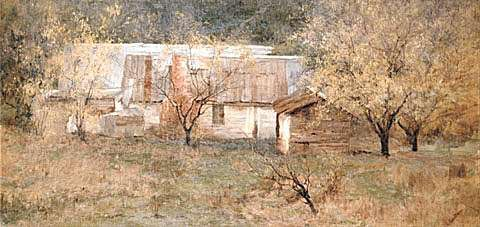
The artist's home, Benalla Art Gallery

== Exhibitions ==
- 1899–1917 - Victorian Artists' Society
- 1907 - First Australian Women's Work Exhibition
- 1914, 1917–1919 – Australian Art Association Exhibition
- 1934 - Exhibition in aid of the Hermannsburg Water Supply in Central Australia

=== Posthumous ===
- 1975 - Australian Women Artists, One Hundred Years 1840–1940, Melbourne University, Ewing and George Paton Gallery
- 1995 - A l'hombre des jeunes filles et des fleurs: In the shadow of young girls and flowers, Benalla Art Gallery
- 2011–2012 - Look, Look Again, Lawrence Wilson Art Gallery, University of Western Australia

== Collections ==
- National Gallery of Australia
- National Gallery of Victoria
- Art Gallery of Ballarat
- Cruthers Collection of Women's Art
- Gippsland Art Gallery
