= George Folingsby =

Irish-born Australian painter

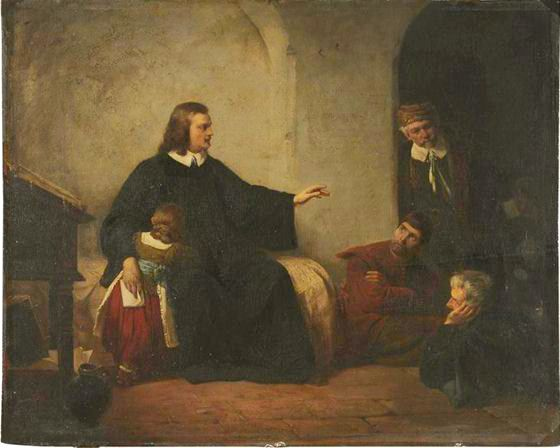
Bunyan in Prison by Folingsby

George Frederick Folingsby (23 August 1828 – 4 January 1891) was an Irish-born Australian painter and art educator.

Folingsby was born in County Wicklow, Ireland. He emigrated to Canada at eighteen and later moved to New York City. He became an illustrator for magazines, including Harper's Magazine.

Folingsby arrived in Melbourne, Australia with his ten-year-old daughter, on 1 July 1879. His reputation as a figure painter preceded him and he was quickly sought after as a portraitist, making a living from commissions of eminent members of Melbourne society. Folingsby was offered the position of Master in the School of Painting at the gallery and was appointed on 1 June 1882.

In September of that year, he was appointed as the first Director of the National Gallery of Victoria.

His students included John Longstaff, Aby Altson, and Iso Rae.

After the death of Folingsby, Lindsay Bernard Hall was appointed Director of the National Gallery of Victoria.
