= Bertha Merfield =

Australian artist, craftsperson and Art Nouveau designer (1869–1921)

Bertha E. Merfield
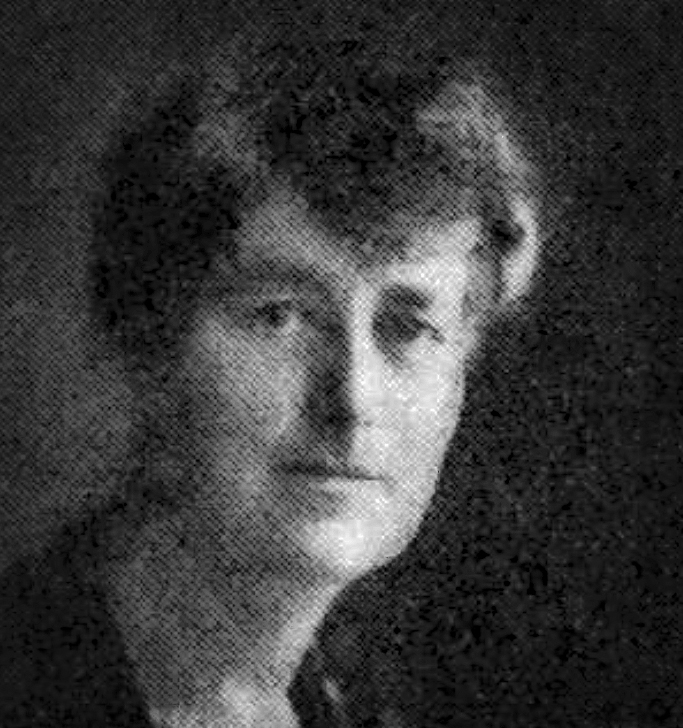
- Portrait of Bertha Merfield in 1920
- Born: 30 January 1869; West Melbourne, Victoria, Australia
- Died: 20 September 1921 (aged 52); Melbourne, Victoria, Australia
- Resting place: Melbourne General Cemetery
- Known for: Painting, decorative arts, mural painting
- Movement: Art Nouveau
- Parents: Thomas Merfield (father); Isabella (née Wardman) (mother)
- Family: siblings Kate, Miriam (Myra), May, Percy, Thomas and Charles
- Awards: Longstaff traveling scholarship
- Elected: member, London Society of Mural Decorators and Painters in Tempera; vice-president Women's Political Association; vice-president Women's Labour Bureau

Bertha Elizabeth Merfield (1869–1921) was an Australian painter, craft worker in metal and leather, and Art Nouveau muralist. She was a founding member of the Twenty Melbourne Painters Society, the British Society of Painters in Tempera, and the Arts and Crafts Society of Victoria.

Merfield, born in Hawke Street, West Melbourne, Victoria on 30 January 1869 to Canadian Isabella (née Wardman) and Englishman Thomas Merfield, was the sister of Kate Hill Merfield, barrister Miriam (Myra) Sarah Merfield, the eleventh woman admitted to the Melbourne Bar, May, Percy, Thomas and Charles James Merfield F.R.A.S., astronomer at the Melbourne Observatory and a founder, and first president, of the Astronomical Society of Victoria.

After her birth her family lived in Ararat and Cemetery Road, Stawell, where Bertha first studied art, and sometime after her father's death on 20 October 1888, they moved to Melbourne.

== Training ==
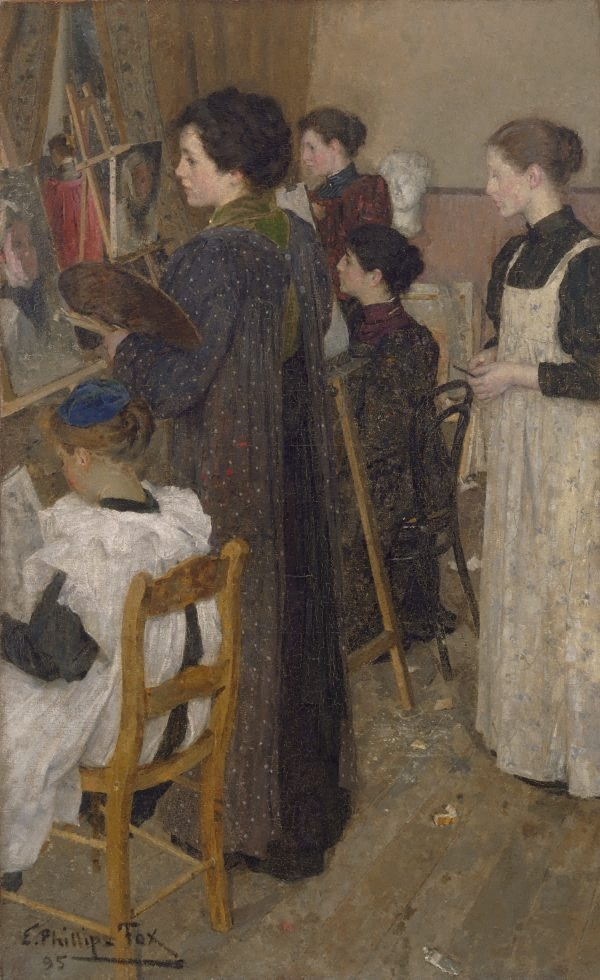
Emmanuel Phillips Fox (1895) Art Students, Art Gallery of New South Wales. Bertha Merfield at right.

After completing her secondary schooling, Merfield studied under George Clausen in England, and then in Paris at the Académie Colarossi, sharing a flat with Bernice Edwell.

Back in Australia Bertha then attended E. Phillips Fox and Tudor St George Tucker's Melbourne School of Art which ran 1893-99, where she was taught in the manner of French Impressionist schools which the two teachers had attended. Fox's 1895 Art Students shows her with Sara Levi, Violet Teague, and Cristina Asquith Baker.

A summer school was also offered at Charterisville that Fox and Tucker had established in the old mansion above the Yarra River in East Ivanhoe, the lease of which they had taken over from Walter Withers in 1893. It was Australia's first recognised summer school of art. The women, including Bertha, Ina Gregory, Mary Meyer, Henrietta Irving, Ursula Foster and Helen Peters were accommodated in rooms of the stone house and a chaperon and housekeeper looked after them. Violet Teague may have been their tutor.

Bertha, then employed as a drawing instructor in the Education Department, joined Lilla Reidy in 1901 for an artists' retreat, with Lucy Sutton and Myrtle Lawrence, at the holiday cottage 'Petite Boheme' in bayside Black Rock.

Merfield next went to the National Gallery of Victoria Art School. In 1908, dressed in Japanese costume, she joined in the students' tableau of English history 'from the stone age to the present day'.

== Painter and craftsperson ==
Merfield exhibited landscapes, portraits, figure compositions and still-life at the Victorian Artists' Society from 1900, serving on its council from 1917, and was a capable craftsperson in a variety of media including fabrics, metal and leather, which she combined with her painting and design. Her seascape in oils was displayed, with ten others of her paintings, in the 1907 First Exhibition of Women's Work, at Melbourne's Exhibition Building, and at the first annual exhibition of The Arts and Crafts Society of Victoria, on the founding council of which she served, Bertha showed stencilled fabrics, an appliqué tablecloth, three decorative panels, a freestanding screen, a two-panel screen, a leatherwork case, a suite of furniture, enamels to her own and others' designs and including a jewellery case. The work received attention in the 1909 proceedings of the Royal Victorian Institute of Architects which noted that it 'represented work on a large scale, all simply and effectively treated.' Her work was also marketed by W. H. Rocke and Co.

In December 1910, having been granted a Longstaff traveling scholarship, Bertha returned on the SS Bremen to London, staying with Edith Onians in Chelsea's artists' quarter, to study again with George Clausen who was 'personally interested in her work,' and at the Slade School, and to survey the latest trends in European applied art. Her painting The Passing Cloud was exhibited at the Royal Academy in 1911. In Finland Merfield visited weaver Baroness von Leaghen from whom she took samples to take back to the Melbourne Arts and Crafts Society.

Merfield returned to London in January 1912 intending to sail back to Australia that February, but stayed on as guest of Mary Sargant Florence and with her joined the group setting up the Society of Painters in Tempera who invited her to join. Its aim was raise mural painting 'to the level of perfection it attained under the ancient Greeks and Romans,' and counted amongst its members Dora Meeson, whom she acknowledged as an encouraging influence, Henry Payne, and Henry Tonks.

In February Merfield exhibited thirty landscape paintings of her homeland at the Australian Commonwealth Offices at 92 Fleet Street, London at the invitation of High Commissioner Sir George Reid. On 18 March she boarded the SS Scharnhorst bound for Australia. She held solo shows in 1912 and 1913 at the Athenaeum gallery.

Merfield made field studies; on their 1919 Tasmanian tour with Marion Mahony Griffin for example, and five years previous she was reported as taking a 'motoring tour', from Mount Buffalo to Mount Kosciuszko, to make 'extensive studies in the bush', leading to one-person and group exhibitions in Sydney, Melbourne and London 1912–1918. In December 1915 she summered at Kirribilli Point to make paintings of Sydney Harbour, and in 1918 at Talisker homestead in Merino, sketching in the Grampians. Alexander Colquhoun reviewing in The Herald the consequent work shown in her September 1918 solo exhibition makes more of that mode:

It stands to Miss Merfield's credit that in making a speciality of applied work she has not ceased to regard nature as the fountain-head of all such endeavours and continues to work assiduously in the open, as the numerous panels of river, shore, and bush, now displayed, testify. The studies and compositions intended for mural purposes are the most elaborate and important in the collection, and represent a phase of pictorial expression interesting in its relation to architecture, and to the beautification and adornment of homes generally.

[…]

A different aspect of nature, treated more literally, but with feeling and a sense of beauty, will be found in the small canvases, entitled Spring and Blossom. The blossom is not cut and stuck in an art jar, but is blooming on a peach tree on the hill side. The painting of these little studies is direct and pleasing.

Throughout Merfield's career exerted herself equally in both the fine and applied spheres of art, whether making landscapes and portraits in the conventional format of the easel painting, or designing labels for medicines.

== Teacher and art collector ==
Registered in 1909 electoral rolls as 'art teacher' living at cnr Princess and High Sts., Kew, from about 1906, she taught painting, drawing, leather repoussé, fabric stencilling, enamelling, and marquetry, and 'preparation for University exams,' at her studio in Alexandra Chambers (demolished and replaced by Burley Griffin's Leonard House in 1924), at 46 Elizabeth Street, Melbourne, where May Vale also had a studio, and whose classes Bertha covered while Vale was overseas in 1906. She donated a prize for leather repoussé to The Ladies' Home Industries Association Second Exhibition at the Athenaeum Gallery, Collins Street, Melbourne.

On her return to Australia in June 1912 from England and Europe Merfield was appointed as art teacher at the University Practising School for Secondary Teachers, and set up a new studio in Scottish House, 90 William Street, Melbourne.

== Muralist ==
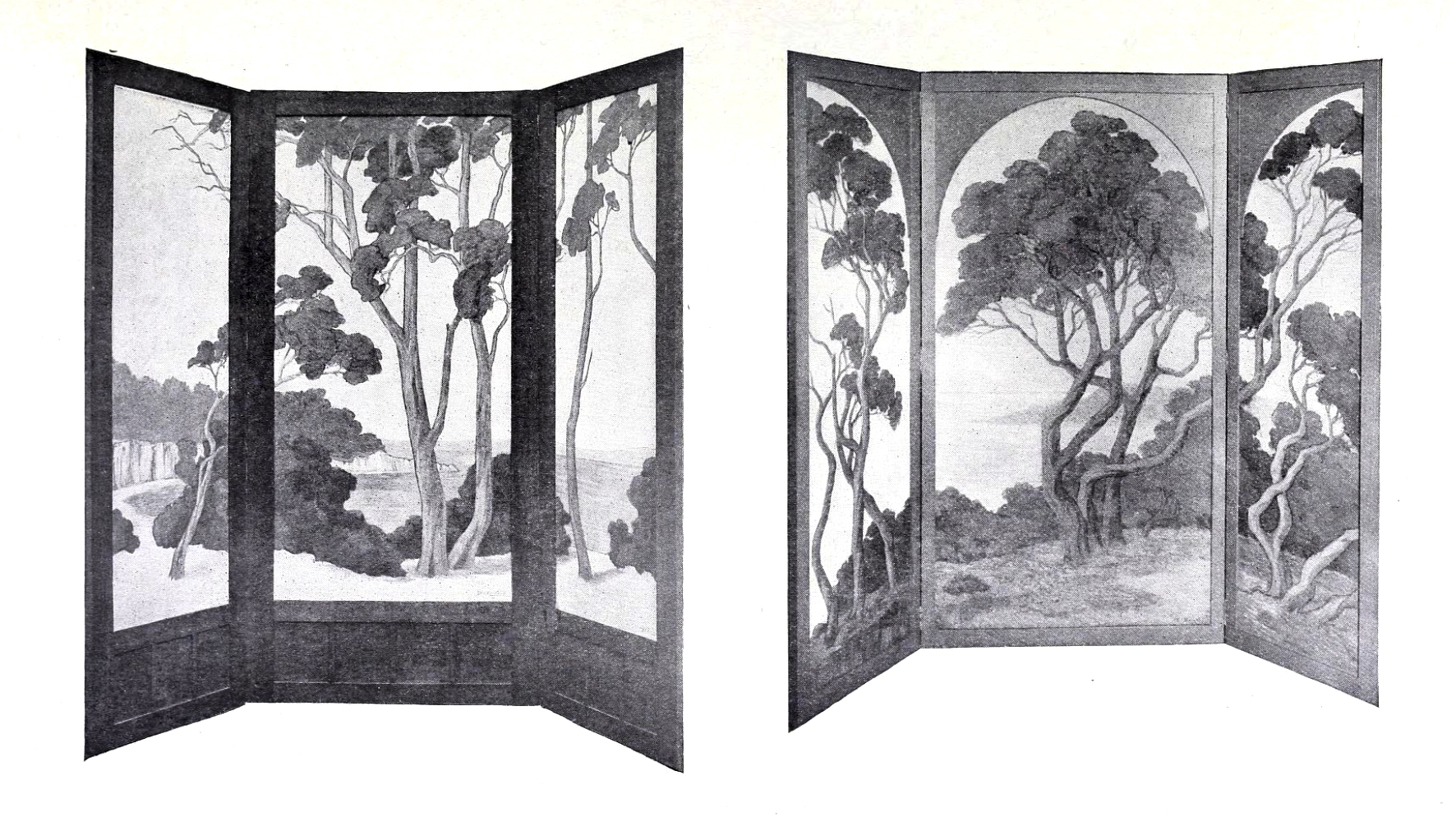
Bertha Merfield screens for the Oriental Hotel, Melbourne, illustrated in Studio International, May 1916

Bertha was recognised as reviving mural painting in Victoria and internationally, a medium that developed from her decorative screens with 'broad effects, and...charming bits of bush landscape from clumps of gnarled trees or slender eucalyptus standing like sentinels against backgrounds of blue sky and fleecy clouds'. Recalling her experience of European architecture, she described the mural as 'the most democratic expression in art.

A Leader article describes her method of staining 'arras cloth':

...she stains in her picture with dyes, outlining the whole of the design with a strong brown line. You could think of nothing more delightful than whole doors treated m this manner. One decorative panel is suggested by the sea seen through the ti-tree at, Portsea. You get the sense wind in the gnarled branches, and feel all the glamor of summer seas in the blue of the water beyond.

Horden's Gallery in Sydney, in an advertisement in The Bookman provides prices for her decorative panels shown there in June 1912; a threefold screen was 35 guineas, 19 for a mantelpiece insert., and paintings ranged from 6 to 28 guineas.

In 1916 The Studio reported that:

Among the craftworkers who are doing noteworthy work may be singled out Miss Bertha Merfield. She is particularly happy in dealing with typically Australian subjects, and especially in her treatment of Ti-tree and various members of the extraordinarily decorative Eucalyptus family.

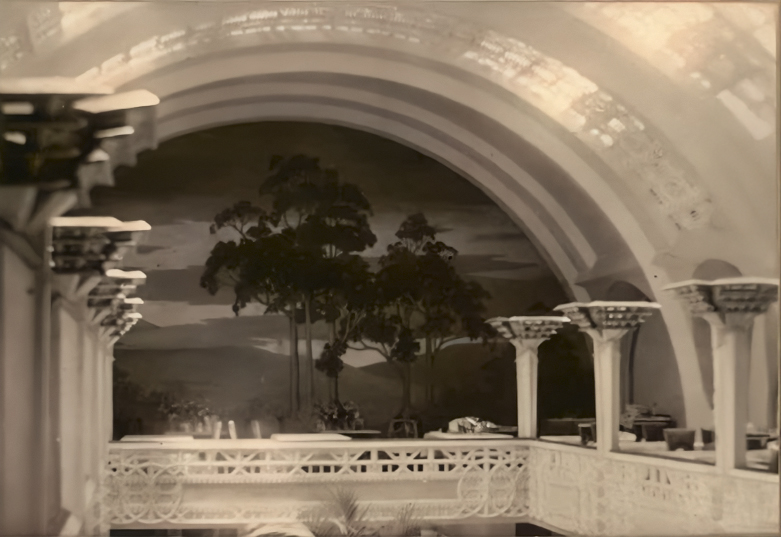
Balcony and Bertha Merfield mural Dawn in The Australian Bush in the main dining hall, Café Australia, Melbourne

In 1916 Walter Burley Griffin and Marion Mahony Griffin undertook for the entrepreneurial Greek émigré restaurateur (Greek Consul-General) Antony J. J. Lucas the luxury remodelling of the Vienna Cafe at 270 Collins Street, Melbourne. They commissioned local artists, including sculptor Margaret Baskerville, jeweller Charles Costerman and Bertha Merfield. Marion and Bertha may have met through Emily Gibson to whom Merfield taught design, and who was later apprenticed to the Griffin company as landscape architect.

When complete in 1916 her mural depicting the Australian bush at dawn, with the sky painted over gold leaf, and the whole filling the south-end lunette under the decoratively perforated barrel-vault of the dining hall gallery, received public acclaim. The Bulletin remarked wittily on her efforts,

Bertha Merfield has been murally decorating the new part of the Vienna Cafe for the last two months. The job is 36 feet one way and 18 feet the other, so the artist has had some mountaineering.

while Punch was more lyrical in its description:

The mural decoration on the end wall, which is semi-circular, is purely Australian in design and colour, and represents "Dawn in the Australian Bush," just when the sun has risen and the sky [etched] with the grey of dawn, with the sun breaking through in patches of golden light. The mist still paints the valley with misterym [sic], and the peace and calm of Nature make harmony. The symbolism in this brings out the dawn of architecture in Australia which combines the arts that the ancient Greeks embraced in their structures—those of sculpture and mural paintings—when craftsmen banded together, each loving his part, to form one harmonious whole.

Her decorations were short-lived, as the building was demolished in 1938. Among her commercial commissions, aside from the popular murals and screens Merfield made for private homes, was the backdrop for a window display for F. H. Brunning seed merchants in Elizabeth Street.

Marion Griffin and Bertha's friendship continued after the Café Australia interior remodelling was finished. They shared an interest in the decorative potential of the eucalyptus form, and when Bertha invited Marion to go with her, and Mabel Hookey and another 'lady painter', sketching together around Tasmania, she agreed. Marion's memoirs record the rough journey across Bass Strait in the SS Loongana, compensated over December 1918–January 1919 with 'a wonderful fortnight which enabled me to add a number of unique trees to my set of Forest Portraits.'

Merfield was a founding member of the Twenty Melbourne Painters Society. The Arts and Crafts Society of Victoria, initiated with the 'First Exhibition of Women's Work' in which she exhibited, first met in her studio in March 1908, and she participated in its first exhibition that year in the Guild Hall. In 1909 her demonstration of stencilling in the Society's exhibition was graced with Dame Nellie Melba's attendance. She was elected a member of the London Society of Mural Decorators and Painters in Tempera, and exhibited in their 1914 Annual show.

Of her last solo exhibition, at Hordern's in Sydney, Daily Telegraph critic William Moore commented on her 'keen eye for the decorative possibilities of Australian trees ... able to pick out their peculiar characteristics their essential rhythms ... wilder, freer, less regular' than the European, and 'suggestive subjects for decorative art'.

== Feminist advocate and activist ==
At Melbourne's conference of women, the Austral Salon in August 1907, Merfield, Violet Teague and Janie Wilkinson Whyte gave papers, with Merfield urging women to take up opportunities in the crafts, which only the Brisbane Courier reported:

Miss Merfield contributed an admirable little paper. She accounted for an absence of the feminine counterpart of the old masters—by the fact that in the early days of art the artist was an artisan, and she prophesied a fine distinctive position for women in the art of sculpture and architecture. Art was a wide subject, and women's undoubted triumphs in music might be regarded as sufficient guarantee that whatever she had done in the past, woman was sure of a distinctive place in the pictorial art of the future.

In June 1911, during her return visit to Europe and England, Merfield marched under the banner of the Southern Cross in the Australian contingent of the Women's Coronation Procession, a parade of 'Forty Thousand Suffragettes' through the streets of London calling for women's voting rights in the year of the Coronation of George V and Mary.

When approached by Elsie Barlow, Bertha made generous loans of a screen from one of her recent exhibitions, and works from her collection to the inaugural exhibition of Castlemaine Art Gallery in 1913. They included paintings by Tudor St George Tucker, Alexander Colquhoun, George Clausen, Frederick McCubbin and Blamire Young.

Also in 1913, Bertha presided at a meeting of the Warrawee Club (founded 1892, cnr Swanston and Collins Sts.) to organise a women's concert in honour of American soprano and suffragist Lillian Nordica, and at which Merfield spoke on 'Women Artists' after Australian suffragist Vida Goldstein presentation on the Women's Political Association, the organisation on which, by 1915, Merfield served as a vice-president, resigning 'to much regret' in April 1916. On 2 December 1913 she held an 'At Home' at the W.P.A., at which Goldstein spoke again.

In May 1914, in her studio, which was then at the St James Building in Collins Street where she continued to give art classes, Merfield gave a well-attended party for Adela Pankhurst

At meetings in 1915 at the Melbourne Town Hall she supported Frances Higgins' efforts toward a co-operative in which women could learn horticultural and agricultural skills toward employment in rural industries. That year six young women commenced working a 23-acre flower farm near Mordialloc, under the auspices of Vida Goldstein, Bertha Merfield, Adela Pankhurst and the Women's Political Association, part of their efforts to alleviate unemployment amongst women. On 16 March the Women's Rural Industry Co. Ltd. was established to financially support the venture, with Pankhurst, Merfield and Goldstein amongst 12 others taking shares. Bertha herself connected classes in garden planning at the Burnley Horticultural Gardens, and one of her most successful students was Edna Walling.

Merfield, then vice-president of the Women's Labour Bureau and identified in media reports as 'a well-known and picturesque writer on the "progressive side"', wrote to urge The Herald newspaper to allow the WPA to advertise the services of women then out of work as charwomen, machinists and cooks in the midst of WWI. While in Sydney for her solo show Merfleid was welcomed by the Feminist Club and in her talk 'Women's Work and Interests ,' informed the audience of pacifist and social justice work being done by women in the United Kingdom and in Melbourne. In April 1917 Merfield, as chair in a 'meet the electors' session in Dandenong, supported Goldstein's fifth, but still unsuccessful, bid for a seat in the Australian Senate.

Remaining single, and hugely prolific, Merfield suffered sometimes from exhaustion; on one occasion in 1912, and not long returned from England, having to postpone an exhibition opening.

== Reception ==
Early reactions to Merfield's solo shows was positive; Table Talk noted the large size of her show, numbering sixty-five pictures, in September 1906 at her studio in the Alexandra Chambers, which almost sold out:

They show a nice feeling for colour...and a certain strength and vigour in treatment. The influence of European study and experience is seen, and some of the most pleasing work depicts the charming English colouring. Of these, the "Moated Farm House" is a very happy example. It lacks the glow and colour of the Australian atmosphere, but its suggestion of cool greyness seems to emphasise the old-world placidity and charm...

The Age critic acknowledged that a 'convincing freshness and spontaneity run through the later small sketches which indicate a growing mastery over her means of expression,' while Julian Ashton of The Argus praised the 'simplicity of motif, delicacy of treatment and sureness of touch' in her oils, but reacted to a 'straining after effect that at times leads almost to the grotesque' in her decorative panels. In the Sydney Sun Ashton questioned how Merfield produced, while in 'foggy London' so many Australian landscapes soon to be shown in her exhibition at Hordern's Gallery in Sydney, and quoted her response:

"It hardly seems strange to me," Miss Merfleld said, when interviewed. "I can not see why an artist should not memorise as well as a musician; most of my pictures have been done from memory, with the help of a few color-notes, and I think work executed by this means enables one to emphasise the beauties of nature to the exclusion of the unnecessary details that go to make a picture stiff and unimaginative. [ … ] No, I have not done figures much. I can never connect them with Australian landscape, which to me does not lend itself to the introduction of the nymphs and dryads of mythology."

Another Ashton review followed in which he considers that her decorative panels and designs for mural decorations presented 'a new aspect in the field of art...the trait that commends them especially for the use to which the artist expects they will be put, is their restfulness, both of subject and treatment. The coloring, though rich, is the subdued coloring of our scrub—the grey-greens of the eucalypts, jade of the sea, and the smoke blue, deepening to mauve, of our Blue Mountain gullies.' He gives special mention to sympathy evolved in her 'unaffected' portraiture, and the quality of the framing as manufactured by the artist. Perth's Daily News was likewise impressed with the fine timbers Merfield selected for her frames, but does not miss the opportunity to compare her, in her choice of the eucalyptus as her subject, to a native of the city, May Gibbs.

Her Sydney solo exhibition at Horderns attracted a lyrical review by an unnamed critic with the Sydney Morning Herald to her 'oils on absorbent canvas' and singling out her:

Nature's Cathedral with the straight stems of the white gums rising from the dry grasses and withered bushes of the plains towards the blue sky with its fleecy clouds, is remarkable for the luminous quality of the atmosphere and for the simple adaptation of nature with but little change to decorative purposes. Stuart Gums growing at the very edge of the sea, as is their wont in and around Hobart, are depicted with the radiant light reflected from their bare grey trunks, with heavy masses of yellow foliage above, and behind a lovely tone of blue water, turning to green as it reaches the shallows near the shore.

Some later responses by art critics to Merfield's canvases, aside from her work intended for interior decoration, would vary. The reviewer in The Bulletin of 19 September 1918, probably Lionel Lindsay, was dismissive:

Miss Bertha Merfield has hung 119 treasured canvases for a fortnight's view at the Athenaeum. The most ambitious subjects are decorative panels in which the Australian eucalypt is mightily helpful in lessening the tedium of a painter with a limited range of backgrounds. Miss Merfield lures the eye from her undistinguished distances with foregrounds of gums, carefully selected for their pose and style and the ability to stand a sort of lyric illustration without damaging the artistic propriety of the pattern. There is no doubt that Miss Merfield makes the painting of these panels almost a religious observance. The effect is solemn and picturesque, and there is every reason to believe that if she continues in this strain she will exalt the gum to a high place in a stained-glass window. A pity the artist had not revealed the same fervor in her landscapes. A lot of these are fit only to grace a land-agent's catalogue.

The Lone Hand provided a broader summation of the value and context of her work. After acknowledging her extensive training, her election as a member of London's Society of Mural Decorators and Painters in Tempera, and her exhibition in London in 1912 which 'drew attention by its originality of idea, the effective simplicity of her lines and the boldness with which she handled colour and light,' the journalist distinguished her democratisation of art in her application of it in interior decoration:

Miss Merfield has executed some fine pieces of mural decoration. At the Cafe’ Australia she has put sunlight and seascape on the wall of the dining-hall. The work requires unerring certainty of stroke, and on such large surfaces has to be carried out on scaffolding often lying down. The colours and mediums had to be mixed by the artist herself. Miss Merfield has opened a new outlook to Australian art. She shows her native land to the world in an entirely original aspect. Apart from the artistic value of her individual efforts, she is leading the way towards the daily use of the best in art, which in its turn is bound to lead to a more generally cultivated appreciation.

== Death ==
Merfield, having moved from 5 Elgin Street, Hawthorn to live with her mother at 'Steynecourt', 54 Park Street, Brunswick, was killed, aged 52, in a fall from an open door of the 4:48 p.m. Sandringham line suburban Tait railway carriage on 20 September 1921 near Richmond. She was seated beside her mother and seen by several witnesses. Though it was widely reported as an accident, the Coroner Robert H. Cole returned a finding of suicide 'whilst suffering from mental depression' for which she had been receiving treatment. Her will shared her £2,100 estate in four properties with her sisters, but only three unidentified paintings are mentioned in probate. Merfield was buried at Melbourne General Cemetery on 23 September 1921.

Marion Knowles writing in The Advocate mourned her death, and remembered her 'winning some years ago the Longstaff travelling scholarship,' and that 'Merfleld's first laurels were gained in Stawell,' noting that one of her last works 'adorns the New Theatre, corner Glenferrie and Dandenong roads, Malvern.’ She praised the ‘daintiness’ of her art,’ ‘faultless accuracy,’ and ‘smoothness of finish,' concluding that:

her skill did not end there, but was made vividly evident in portraiture in oils, one of her figure paintings, a dark-eyed girl in Eastern robe, having been given a place of honour on the walls of a noted art gallery. Miss Merfield's successes abroad never tempted her to hold less dear the Australian scenes and friends, for whom she never ceased to cherish a fervent and faithful affection.

== Legacy ==
In December 1921 Merfield's artworks were sold at auction, and again by Leonard Joel auctioneers in October 1925. Numbers of the buildings which Merfield's murals decorated, including The Oriental in Russell Street, Melbourne, Cafe Australia in Collins Street, and the New Malvern Theatre have since been destroyed, so the recognition she enjoyed in her lifetime has declined and is only in the twenty-first century being regained amidst a greater general attention to women artists.

== Exhibitions ==
- 1902, November: Entrant, First Prize (£3), South Street Competitions, Ballarat
- 1905, July: Victorian Artists' Society Winter Exhibition, Albert Street, East Melbourne
- 1906, July: Victorian Artists' Society Exhibition, Albert Street, East Melbourne
- 1906, September: Paintings and 'Paris handiworks', Merfield studio, Alexandra Chambers, 46 Elizabeth Street, Melbourne
- 1907, August: Leatherwork, in Victorian Artists' Society Exhibition, Albert Street, East Melbourne
- 1907, October: First Exhibition of Women's Work, Melbourne's Exhibition Building
- 1907, November: Federal Art Exhibition, National Gallery of South Australia
- 1908, from 15 January: Arts and Crafts Society exhibition. Town Hall, Hobart
- 1908, 23–30 September: Private view of paintings and handicrafts. Merfield studio, Alexandra Chambers, 46 Elizabeth Street, Melbourne
- 1908, 2–12 December: First Arts and Crafts Society Annual Exhibition, Guild Hall (now Storey Hall, RMIT)
- 1909, August: Arts and Crafts Society of Victoria exhibition with Lady Gibson-Carmichael, Christabel Courtney, Montgomery, Euphemia Topp, Ada Newman, Shannon (?) Brett, Rachel Dunn, Maude Thatcher, and Louie Riggall. The Society's rooms, Robb's Building, 527 Collins Street, Melbourne
- 1909, October: Arts and Crafts Society exhibition, with Dorothea Adams, Vera Synott, Bertha Merfield, ‘Miss Cummings’, Jessie Traill, Portia Geach and Miss Wilson. The Society's rooms, Robb's Building, 527 Collins Street, Melbourne
- 1910, February: A.N.A. Exhibition
- 1910, 6–14 September: Solo exhibition of paintings, copper and leatherwork. Alexandra Chambers studio
- 1911: Royal Academy, London
- 1912, from 18 February: London show of decorative panels, Australian Commonwealth Offices, opened by High Commissioner Sir George Reid
- 1912: Society of Mural Decorators and Painters exhibition, Manchester
- 1912, September: Solo exhibition, Melbourne Athenaeum
- 1913, October: Solo exhibition of paintings, Melbourne Athenaeum
- 1914, February: Arts and Crafts Society Education Exhibition in collaboration with The Australian Natives' Association. Exhibition Building, Melbourne
- 1914: Annual Exhibition of the Society of Painters in Tempera, Royal Exchange, London
- 1915, 1–21 June: Solo exhibition of decorative panels, Anthony Hordern's Fine Art Gallery, New Palace Emporium, Brickfield Hill, Sydney
- 1915, August: Arts and Crafts Society of Victoria group show, Elizabeth House
- 1917, June: Victorian Artists' Society Annual Exhibition
- 1917, September: Victorian Artists' Society Spring Exhibition
- 1918, 7 June: 100 Posters and illustrations by Australian artists Reba Rigg, Charlotte Elizabeth James, Alice Farr, E. Jackson Morris, Edith Alsop, Ethel Spowers, Bertha Merfield. Arts and Crafts Society, 182 Collins Street, Melbourne
- 1918, from 19 June: Victorian Artists' Society
- 1918, 11–26 September: Solo exhibition of decorative panels, Melbourne Athenaeum
- 1919, 5–16 August: Twenty Melbourne Painters. Athenaeum
- 1919: Anthony Hordern's Fine Art Gallery, New Palace Emporium, Brickfield Hill, Sydney
- 1919, from 12 November: Arts and Crafts Society of Victoria. Federal Government House, Melbourne
- 1920, from 11 May: Solo show of canvases and screens, Anthony Hordern's Fine Art Gallery, New Palace Emporium, Brickfield Hill, Sydney
- 1920, 4–14 August: Twenty Melbourne Painters, with A.M.E. Bale, Jo Sweatman, William Frater, Ruth Sutherland, Isabel Tweddle, Polly Hurry, Richard McCann, Alexander Colquhoun, Edward Kimpton, Frank Crozier, Bertha Merfield, Carl Hampel, Rose Walker, George Colville, Elsie Barlow, William Rowell, John Rowell, Bernice Edwell, Webb Gilbert, opened by Sir John Monash, Athenaeum gallery
- 1920, November: Society of Women Painters, Sydney

=== Posthumous ===
- 1978, 29 March-19 April: A collection of Australian women artists, 1900-1970. Artists presented were:- Alice Panton, Doris Boyd, Christina Asquith Baker, Bertha Merfield, Jessie Gibson, Elsie Barlow, Gwendoline Barringer, Amelia Mary Phillips, Mary Grigg, Maude Priest, Gladys Reynell, Josephine Muntz-Adams, Aileen Dent, Amalie Colquhoun, Jo Sweatman, Agnes Goodsir, Marie Tuck, Gladys Owen, Bess Golding, Norah Gurdon, Stephanie Taylor, Margery Withers, Dora Lynell Wilson, Esther Paterson, Ida Rentoul Outhwaite, Doreen Goodchild, Isabel McKenzie, Dorrit Black, Mary Edwards, Caroline Barker, Isabel Huntington, Klyte Pate, Lorna Quirk, Mabel Hawkins, Marjorie Campbell Gwynne, Annie Alison Greene, Nellie Markey, June Mackenzie, Mary McLeish, Nornie Gude, Margaret Bevan, Vera Leichney, Elizabeth Durack, Margarita Anna Stipnieks, Nancy Clifton, Patricia Englund, Bertha Buxton, Jessie Traill, Dora Whitford, Norbertine Bresslern-Roth, Evelyn Syme, Lydia Koblicha, Helen Reid, Jean Armitage, Mary Macqueen, Barbara Brash, Hertha Kluge-Pott, Elizabeth Rooney, Gail Feltham, Ola Cohn, Nicole Newman. Duvance Galleries, 26-27 Lower Plaza Southern Cross Hotel, corner Exhibition and Bourke Streets, Melbourne
- 1986, 2–30 November: End of year exhibition: Alexander Aldridge, Veda Arrowsmith, Margaret Baskerville, James Beament, George Bell, Doris Boyd, Vincent Brown, Rupert Bunny, Maurice Carter, Peggie Crombie, George Crossley, J.W. Curtis, Mary Edwards, Myrtle Fasken, Tasman Fehlberg, James Flett, H.P. Gill, Murray Griffin, May Grigg, Gilda Gude, Hal Gye, Stewart Handasyde, William Hunter, Peggy Jones, Audrey Keller, Kioshige (attributed), Percy Leason, Lionel Lindsay, Rose Lowcay, Bertha Merfield, Anne Montgomery, Lucy Newell, Russell Penfold, Adelaide Perry, Margaret Pestell, Thea Proctor, Liz Rastrick, Frederick Reynolds, Dora Serle, Gayfield Shaw, Margarita Stipnieks, Jean P. Sutherland, Eveline Syme, Jessie Traill, Raymond Wallis, Julius Wentcher, Charles Wheeler, Lady Mabel Williams, Victor Zelman. Jim Alexander Gallery, East Malvern, Victoria
- 2002, 1 March–1 May: Lyceum Club 90th birthday exhibition: Marion Jones, Henrietta Gulliver, Mary Macqueen, Mrs. Alfred Deakin, May Vale, Dora Wilson, Aileen Dent, Marjorie McChesney Mathews, Janie Wilkinson Whyte, Ruby Winifred McCubbin, Pegg Clarke, Dora Meeson Coates, Ethel Carrick Fox, Edith Alsop, Josephine Muntz Adams, Dora Serle, John Mather, Jessie Traill, Ethel Spowers, Arthur Streeton, Madge Freeman, Esther Paterson, Hans Heysen, Janet Agnes Cumbrae Stewart, Anne Montgomery, Emanuel Phillips Fox, George Coates, Violet Teague, Rupert Bunny, Edith Alsop, Elsie Barlow, Bertha Merfield, Lois W. Baglin, Eveline Syme. Lyceum Club, Melbourne

== Publications ==
- Cover illustration Sargant, George; Waller, Napier (1915). The Sweet Heart of the Bush. Lothian. pp. Cover.
