= Mary Meyer (artist) =

Australian painter, arts patron and collector (1878–1975)

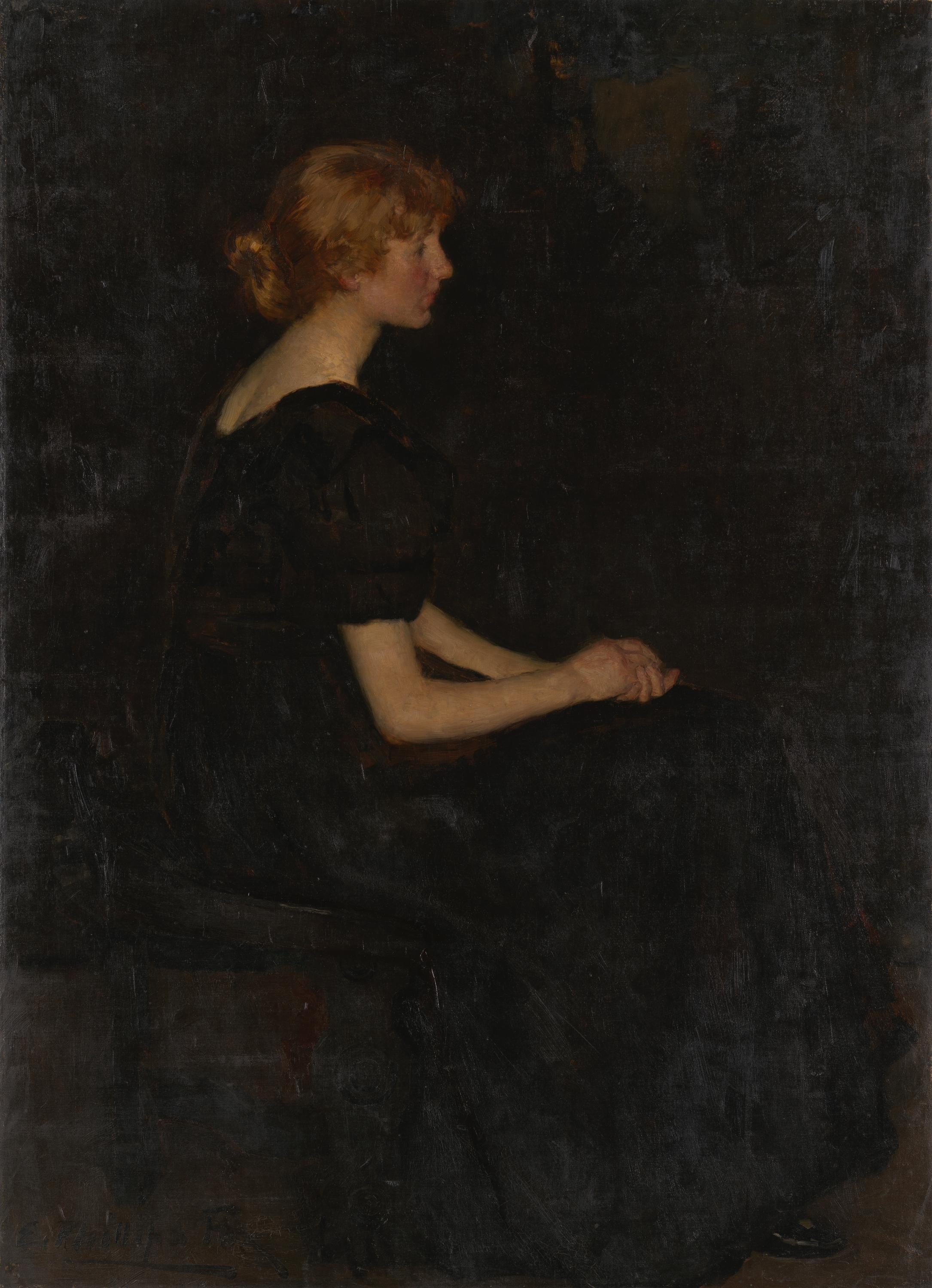
- E. Phillips Fox, (c.1898) Portrait of Mary, daughter of Professor Nanson, oil on canvas, National Gallery of Victoria, Melbourne.
- Born: Mary Fisher Nanson; 1878; Melbourne, Australia
- Died: 11 March 1975 (aged 97); Melbourne, Australia
- Education: Westminster School of Art; Slade School of Fine Art
- Known for: Oil painting
- Style: Australian Impressionism
- Spouse: Felix Meyer (m. 1904; died 1937)

Mary Fisher Meyer (née Nanson) (1878–1975) was an Australian painter, arts patron and collector.

== Early life and education ==
Meyer was born in 1878 in Melbourne, the second daughter, after Margaret Isabel, of Elizabeth (née McMichael), first wife of Edward Nanson, and older sister of Eleanor Lucy, Katherine St Clair, Francis Wiliam and Judith. In the year of Mary's birth her father had emigrated to Australia with his family to take up a position as Professor of Mathematics at the University of Melbourne.

From 1896 to 1900 Mary studied with E. Phillips Fox and Tudor St George Tucker at their Melbourne School of Art which ran 1893-99, and in which she was taught in the manner of French Impressionist schools in which the two teachers had studied, and with more liberal methods than the academy-style instruction of the National Gallery of Victoria art schools. A summer school was offered at Charterisville that Fox and Tucker had established in the old mansion above the Yarra River in East Ivanhoe, the lease of which they had taken over from Walter Withers in 1893. It was Australia's first recognised summer school of art. The women, including Ina Gregory, Mary Meyer, Bertha Merfield, Henrietta Irving, Ursula Foster and Helen Peters were accommodated in rooms of the stone house and a chaperon and housekeeper looked after them. Violet Teague may have been their tutor.

Mary's beauty inspired E P Fox, whose patron was her future husband, Felix Meyer, to paint a portrait of her at age twenty (though Germain has it that the subject is her sister), in the course of which Fox made a finished charcoal drawing. His Whistleresque Portrait of Mary, Daughter of Professor Nanson was exhibited in 1898 at an exhibition of Australian Art in London, at the Grafton Gallery, and is now held in the National Gallery of Victoria.

In about 1902 Mary herself traveled, with her Charterisville friend Ursula Foster (model for Fox's Lady in Black and A Love Story) to study at the Westminster School of Art and at the Slade. She then travelled and painted throughout Europe. Her mother died not long after her return, in 1904, when Mary was 26. Her father remarried in 1913, to Mavourneen Bertha Wettenhall who was only two years older than Mary.

On 20 January 1904 Nanson, then resident at the George Hotel in St Kilda, married, in the registry office because of their differing faiths, the Jewish obstetrician and gynecologist Professor Felix Meyer, born 19 June 1858, the son of son of Menk Meyer and Rebecca (née Fink). The couple had no children, were avid supporters of the arts, and traveled together in Europe in 1927, as noted in The Home: an Australian quarterly:

Doctor and Mrs. Felix Meyer, who are straying through Europe, have tasted the delights of the English Lakes, Scotland, Derby, Devon, Cornwall, and later were off to the Continent. Mrs. Meyer was, before her marriage, Miss Nanson, daughter of Professor Nanson, of the Melbourne University, and is an artist of more than ordinary merit. The popular Doctor, by his sunny temperament, has earned the soubriquet amongst his friends of “Australia Felix.’’

Juliet Peers proposes that the marriage caused a rift with Mary's family, and that her:

Art collecting and the production of a prolific oeuvre of small plein-air works (and copies after the admired Arthur Streeton) possibly compensated her for a degree of social ostracism. Her marriage to a Jewish man some years her senior having caused some consternation...Jewishness could still have a certain social stigma at the time of her inter-faith marriage, a generation before Jewish radicals became to a great degree the conscience and leaders of Melbourne cultural life.

On the occasion of Streeton's knighthood he sent a note of thanks (now held in the National Gallery of Australia) to Felix and his 'dear wife' for their congratulations.

== Artist ==
Mary submitted paintings in the competitive sections of the First Exhibition of Women's Work held over October 1907 at Melbourne's Exhibition Building. Her A Sorrento Lime Boat painted that year (and now in the National Gallery of Australia collection) won Best Seascape and a Special Prize of 5 guineas (A$731.60 relative value in 2022). During preparations for the exhibition in July 1907, her husband Felix donated two guineas to the prize fund.

Throughout the 1920s-1930s, though perhaps as early as 1912, Mary shared a studio with Ada Plante and Isabel Tweddle in Collins Street, Melbourne, which Max Meldrum frequented, and neighbouring Felix's private practice in obstetrics and gynaecology. Being close to Lina Bryans' mother Mary developed a life-long friendship with Lina. Mary also associated with Tom Roberts and especially Rupert Bunny, who also made a portrait of her, in 1911.

In 1936 Mary's father died at 86, followed on 31 August 1937 by her husband who died in Armadale aged 79 only two years after his retirement.

To support the French Red Cross, in July 1916 Meyer participated in an auction of works advertised as 'by Australia's Leading Artists,' beside Rupert Bunny, Edward Officer, Ethel Carrick, Walter Withers, Arthur Boyd, Janet Cumbrae Stewart, Violet Teague, Josephine Muntz Adams, Clara Southern, Ina Gregory, Dora Meeson, and others. Vocal in her abhorrence of cruelty to animals, after the devastating 1939 Black Friday bushfires Mary made donations to a charity started by Louisa Lord Smith of the animal Welfare League, and during World War Two she contributed to charities including the Melbourne Lord Mayor's Fund.

== Style ==
Meyer painted prolifically, specialising in small, Impressionist landscapes influenced by her time at Charterisville, seldom exhibiting because, given her wealth, she had no need to work professionally, though she was dismissed or overlooked because of that; she was satisfied to exercise her creativity. Her technique was impressionistic, using rapid strokes with a round brush as did the French Impressionists, and bold colours evident in her early self-portrait. For landscapes she tended to use the blue and green hues favoured amongst the Charterisville students and during her attendance there modified and modulated her brushwork.

== Death and legacy ==
On 11 March 1975 Mary Meyer died in Melbourne at the age of 97. Ten years earlier Melbourne's Lyceum Club, of which she had been a founding member and member of its Art Circle, held a retrospective of her work when she was in her late eighties. Peers records that 'Mary was rather rather prickly towards some classical modernists at the Lyceum Club in the early 1960s who assumed she was an 'amateur' painter.'

A substantial part of her nearly $874,000 estate was endowed to the University of Melbourne for its medical library and $130,000 to the University of Melbourne for postgraduate scholarships in literature and in obstetrics and gynecology in her husband's name. Three hundred works from her collection, which included paintings by Bunny, Streeton, Fox, Heyson, Roberts and others, were donated to the National Gallery of Australia and the National Gallery of Victoria and many of her own paintings were offered to a succession of Victorian regional galleries in 1976.

Despite her prolific production, Meyer's work rarely appears at auction, but interest in her is increasing; Yarra River attracted A$7977, which was to that date, September 2024, the highest price recorded for her work. Mary Meyer also attracted attention at the same auction with Cows in Landscape, that sold for $2000, exceeding an estimate of $600 to $800, and her Portrait of Dr Felix Meyer, which went for $2500, well above the estimate of $700.

== Exhibitions ==
- 1907, October: First Exhibition of Women's Work, Melbourne's Exhibition Building.
- 1916, 21 July: Auction of artworks in support of the French Red Cross 'by Australia's Leading Artists,' including: Rupert Bunny, Edward Officer, Ethel Carrick, Walter Withers, Robert Taylor-Ghee, Arthur Boyd, A. McClintock, Janet Cumbrae Stewart, Violet Teague, Josephine Muntz Adams, Clara Southern, William Rowland Coleman, S. A. Edmonds, Mary Meyer, Ina Gregory, Mrs. Goodwin Green, John D. Banks, William Menzies Gibb, Dora Meeson, and others. The Atheneum, Upper Hall, Collins Street, Melbourne
- 1965: Retrospective. The Lyceum Club, Melbourne

=== Posthumous ===
- 1976, 17 September–22 October: survey show of work by students of Mildred Lovett, oils by Mary Meyer. Important Women Artists, East Malvern
- 1978, 6 –22 October: survey show of work by students of Mildred Lovett, oils by Mary Meyer. Important Women Artists, East Malvern
- 1992 Completing the Picture: Women Artists and the Heidelberg Era, travelling exhibition curated by Artmoves
- 1995, 8 March–25 April: Women hold up half the sky, National Gallery of Australia
- 2007, 21 October–9 December: Portrait of an exhibition. Castlemaine Art Gallery and Historical Museum
- 2013, July–October: Australian Impressionists in France, National Gallery of Victoria, Federation Square

== Collections ==
- Australian National Gallery
- National Gallery of Victoria
- Geelong Art Gallery
- Bendigo Art Gallery
- Castlemaine Art Museum
