= Cristina Asquith Baker =

Australian artist

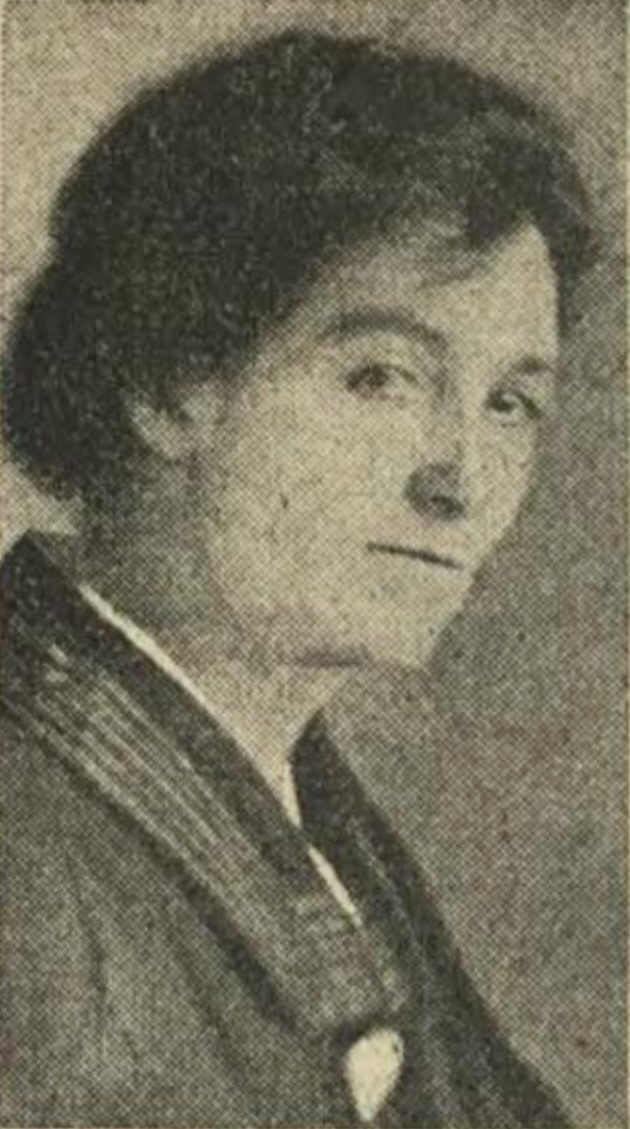
- Born: 1868; London, England
- Died: 1960 (aged 91–92); Surrey Hills, Victoria, Australia
- Education: National Gallery of Victoria Art School, Melbourne, and several others
- Known for: painter, print-maker, art teacher
- Awards: Finalist, Archibald Prize, 1932

Cristina Asquith Baker (1868–1960) was an Australian artist. She is best known for her paintings, lithographs, and textile art. She began her studies in art in Australia, and later spent time training in France and England, gaining expertise in various forms of artistic expression including lithography and carpet-making.

== Early life ==
Asquith Baker was born in London, England, in 1868. Her parents were William Asquith Baker and Cristina Millbanks. The family migrated to Melbourne in 1870. William's work as a Presbyterian minister meant the family moved frequently during her childhood, mostly around the state of Victoria. Her niece, Jean Morrison recalls that the members of the extended family were always close-knit, supporting one another and sharing accommodation at times. Morrison also recalls that her aunt had particularly fond childhood memories of the country town of Seymour, where the Asquith Bakers lived for four years in the 1870s. In a childhood accident, Asquith Baker suffered permanent damage to her right eye. She completed her secondary schooling at the Presbyterian Ladies' College, Melbourne, also attended by her life-long friend and fellow artist Ada May Plante.

After leaving secondary school, Asquith Baker embarked upon her professional training as an artist, which she continued intermittently over the years in Australia and Europe. Through the 1880s and 1890s, Asquith Baker studied at the Port Melbourne School of Art and the National Gallery of Victoria Art School, where she studied drawing under Frederick McCubbin. Around this time she also trained at the Melbourne School of Art, where she studied under E. Phillips Fox. Between 1902 and 1905 Asquith Baker trained in Europe, including studying at the Académie Julian in Paris, and at the Étaples art colony in northern France. By 1914 Asquith Baker had undertaken training in printmaking and lithography, possibly studying under the British artist Francis Ernest Jackson.

== Career ==
Asquith Baker first showed her work in public at an exhibition in 1896 with the Victorian Artists Society.

In 1902 she left Australia to study and work in Europe. Despite selling her paintings for good prices she maintained only a subsistence living, and returned to Melbourne in 1905. Back in Australia she was able to supplement her painting earnings by teaching classes in painting and drawing at her studio at Alexander Chambers in Elizabeth Street, Melbourne.

In 1909, Asquith Baker was elected to the Council of the Victorian Artists Society.

Between 1912 and 1914 Asquith Baker returned to work and study in Paris & London. In 1914, after a London gallery owner encouraged her to focus her work exclusively on studies and paintings of roses, Asquith Baker declared that landscape was a part of her artistic life and she would not give it up.

In 1932 she entered two portraits in the competition for the Archibald prize, and was judged to be one of the finalists.

== Exhibitions ==
Exhibitions showing her work include:

- 1896. Victorian Artists Society exhibition.
- 1898. Royal Academy, London. Included the painting "Quiet of the Cottage".
- 1904. "Quite of the Cottage" was shown in Paris Old Salon.
- 1906–1912. Regular exhibitions with the Victorian Artists Society and the Melbourne Society of Women Painters and Sculptors.
- 1911. Exhibition with the Yarra Sculptors and the Melbourne Athenaeum.
- 1913. Solo exhibition of Australian landscapes, portraits and flora. At the Baillie Gallery, Bond St, London.
- 1914. Solo exhibition at Miss Nicholl's Studio, England.
- 1933. Athenaeum Gallery, Melbourne, Victoria.
- 1935. Athenaeum Gallery, Melbourne, Victoria.
- 1977. Jim Alexander Gallery, East Malvern, Victoria. Exhibition included C Asquith Baker and several of her contemporaries: Violet Teague, Mary Meyer and A.M.E. Bale (already on show in gallery).
- 1978. Duvance Galleries. "A Collection of Australian Women Artists, 1900–1970".
- 1986. Solo exhibition at Jim Alexander Gallery, East Malvern, Victoria.
- 2018. S H Ervin Gallery, Sydney. "Intrepid Women: Australian Women Artists in Paris, 1900–1950".
- 2025. Art Gallery of South Australia. "Dangerously Modern: Australian Women Artists in Europe 1890–1940".

== Death and legacy ==
Asquith Baker was working in Europe when World War I was declared. She returned to Melbourne that year, and remained there for the rest of her life, apart from time spent in South Australia to support her sister (1939–1945), and an excursion to Alice Springs to paint (aged 87).

In 1960 Asquith Baker died at the age of 92, in Surrey Hills. She continued to paint until the end of her life.

Her work is held in the collections of the following galleries:

- National Gallery of Australia.
- Art Gallery of South Australia.
- Cruthers Collection of Women's Art (CCWA) at the University of Western Australia.
- National Gallery of Victoria.
- Queensland Art Gallery and Gallery of Modern Art.
- Art Gallery of New South Wales.

== Bibliography ==
- Moore, W 1980, The story of Australian Art: from the earliest known art of the continent to the art of today, Angus and Robertson, Sydney.
- Freak, E., Lock, T., Tunnicliffe, W. (eds). 2025. Dangerously Modern: Australian Women Artists in Europe 1890-1940. Gordon Darling Foundation, Australia.
