= Café Australia =

Significant interior design of a Melbourne restaurant 1916

Café Australia was a restaurant in Melbourne, Victoria, Australia. It was known for its distinctive interior redesign in 1915-16 by architect Marion Mahony Griffin, in her partnership with Walter Burley Griffin, for owner Antony J. J. Lucas. The building was demolished in 1938.

== History ==
Café Australia was originally Café Gunsler, on the ground floor of a Victorian three-storey building at 268–274 Collins Street, Melbourne, Victoria, by Melbourne architect Lloyd Tayler and built by Harry Lockington, for pastry cook John Ferdinand Gunsler, and opened in 1879 for fine dining. Its location near the Block Arcade drew a fashionable and wealthy clientele. In 1909 Café Gunsler was purchased by two Austrians, Edlinger and Goetz, who renamed it the Vienna Café. In 1908 the popular business was purchased by restaurateur Antony J Lucas who by 1915 planned to expand it into adjoining premises previously leased by W. H. Glen and Co. Pty Ltd., music sellers, initially appointing architect Nahum Barnet, to make it "the most up to date in the Commonwealth both as regards furnishings and cuisine".

It was rebranded Café Australia due to sensitivities about Austria as an enemy of the Allies during World War I. Lucas was born in Greece, a country at first neutral during WWI before joining the Allies in June 1917. In June 1916, when feelings against Germans ran high, Fitzroy pastrycook George Sehlckert, himself the subject of violence due to his name, and his status as "a naturalised subject of enemy origin" noted by the court, was fined £25 (equal to $2,928.00 in 2025), with £5/5/ costs for using the unregistered name 'Café Australia' on his shop window in Brunswick Street.

== Design ==
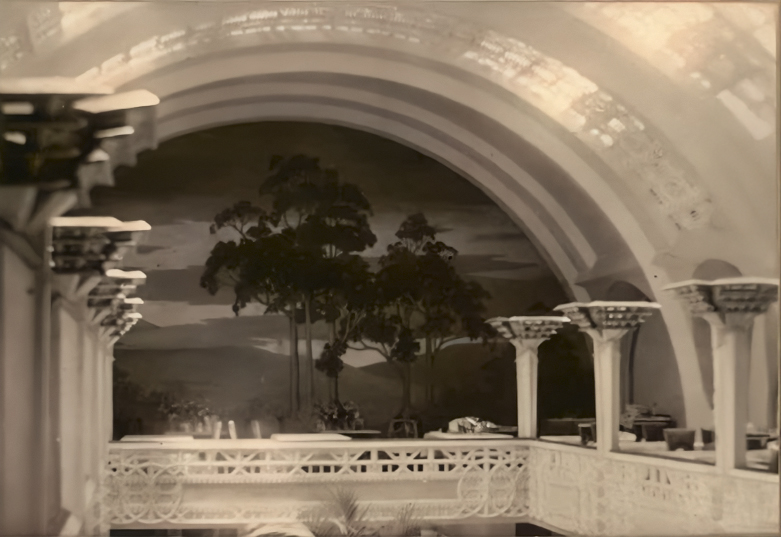
Café Australia dining hall

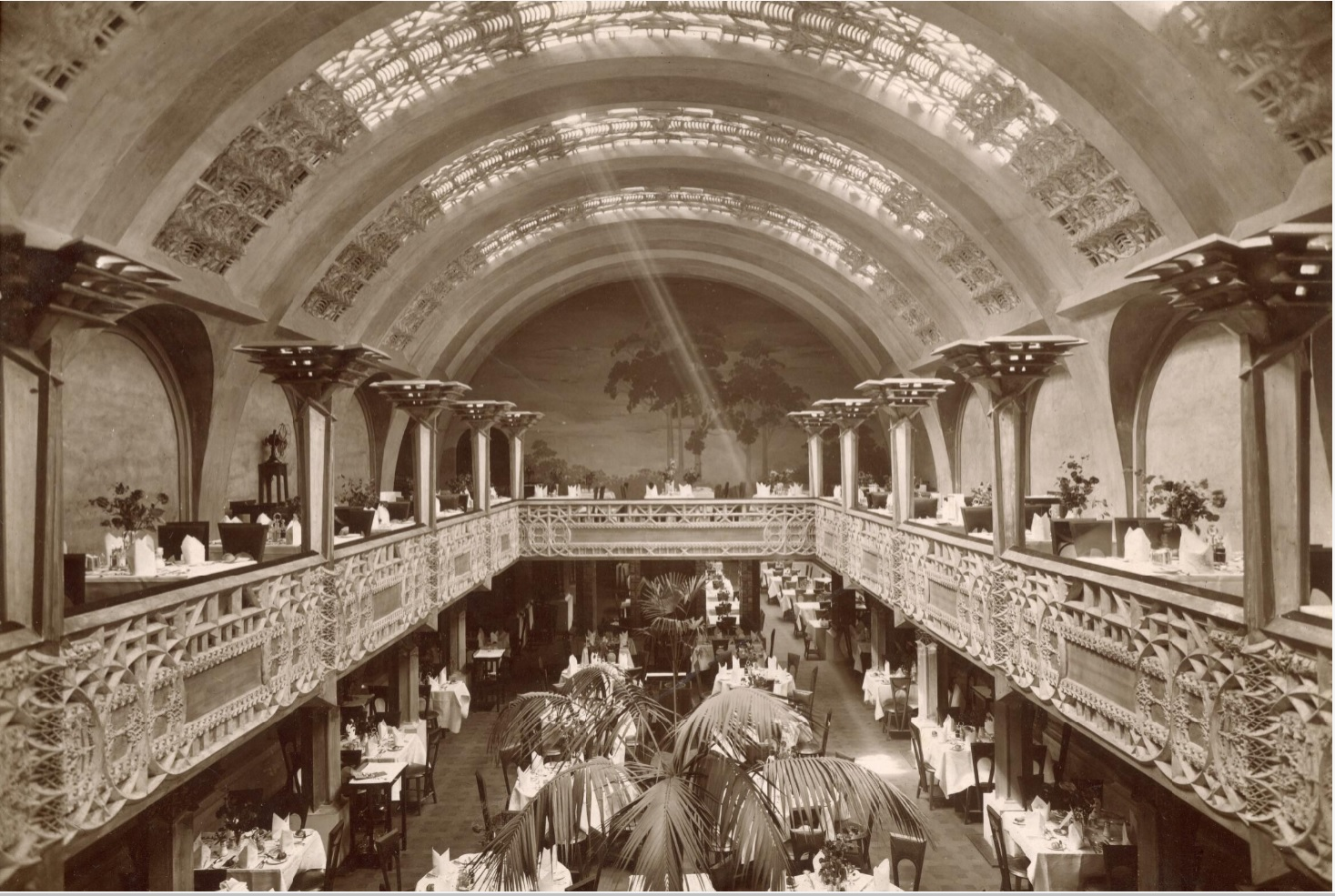
Cafe Australia Banqueting Hall

Café Australia's Prairie School style featured organic architectural forms with geometric patterns, Delft tiles, and with a palette of gold, green, and ivory. The Griffins' first private commission, Marion laid it out in an open plan with interconnected spaces through which visitors moved from an entrance lobby into the Fern Room, the Fountain Court in which four fountains were lit with underwater coloured lights, and under a skylight-pierced barrel-vault over the Main Dining Room and Banquet Hall. The cost of renovations was estimated at £25,000 (equal to $2,214,000.00 in 2025).

Marion moved to the Griffins's Melbourne studio, while Walter continued to work in Canberra as federal capital director. The renovation of Café Australia was a joint project on which Marion's work over 1915-16 constitutes the majority, and is described in the Encyclopedia of interior design as "the country's first proto-modern interior...an inspired amalgam, demonstrating their superb handling of space and concealed lighting as well as an ability to design all elements, including furniture and tablewares."

Marion Griffin, in her autobiographical manuscript The Magic of America, wrote of the 'Australia':

one could perhaps say it is the most beautiful Café in the world. It is certainly unique. It introduced Griffin to Australia because it was the first completed work of his over there. It occupied the ground floor of a down town building under the light well of the building and consisted of five rooms separated not by walls but by great piers which carried the structure of the building above. It was lighted in part by the open vaulted grill under the light well and partly by stained glass ceiling panels screening electric lamps.

The project incorporated work Marion commissioned from sculptor Margaret Baskerville; muralist Bertha Merfield who painted the eucalypt murals and who with Marion went on to design Newman Catholic student college at Melbourne University; Charles Costerman who carved Port Jackson figs and ti-trees in high relief on the decorative columns. Baskerville decorated three piers of the ground floor Fountain Court with figures of the nymphs Persephone, Echo and Flora standing waist-deep in fields of grain.

== Restaurant ==
The restaurant catered for corporate banquets, and fundraising events, as well as for private diners for whom the kitchens were made open for inspection. However it ran foul of Victoria's licensing laws which required that a public bar have sleeping accommodation, an issue which entailed a court case before the Licenses' Reduction Board in June 1920.

Lucas's Café was the subject of a police raid in July 1922 with resultant fines of £1 each for three drinkers; also a theft of £200 from its safe by persons who had concealed themselves somewhere in the spacious interior after closing time; and it was visited by skylarking university students in 1926.

== Other uses ==
There were unrelated enterprises named "Café Australia", including one operating in Sydney at 112 King St in 1899, relocated at 250 George Street through the early 1900s, and others; in Port Adelaide in the 1910s; and Narrandera in the 1920s-30s.
