= Lilla Reidy =

Australian painter (1858–1933)

- Born: Elizabeth Mary Ann Reidy; 1858; Hobart, Tasmania, Australia
- Died: 27 November 1933 (aged 74–75)
- Known for: Painting and charitable work

Elizabeth Mary Ann (Lilla) Reidy (1858–1933) was an Australian artist who painted society portraits, still life, interiors and landscapes. During World War I she headed a group of women artists who painted military themes on calico and gum leaves to raise money for the war effort.

== Early life ==
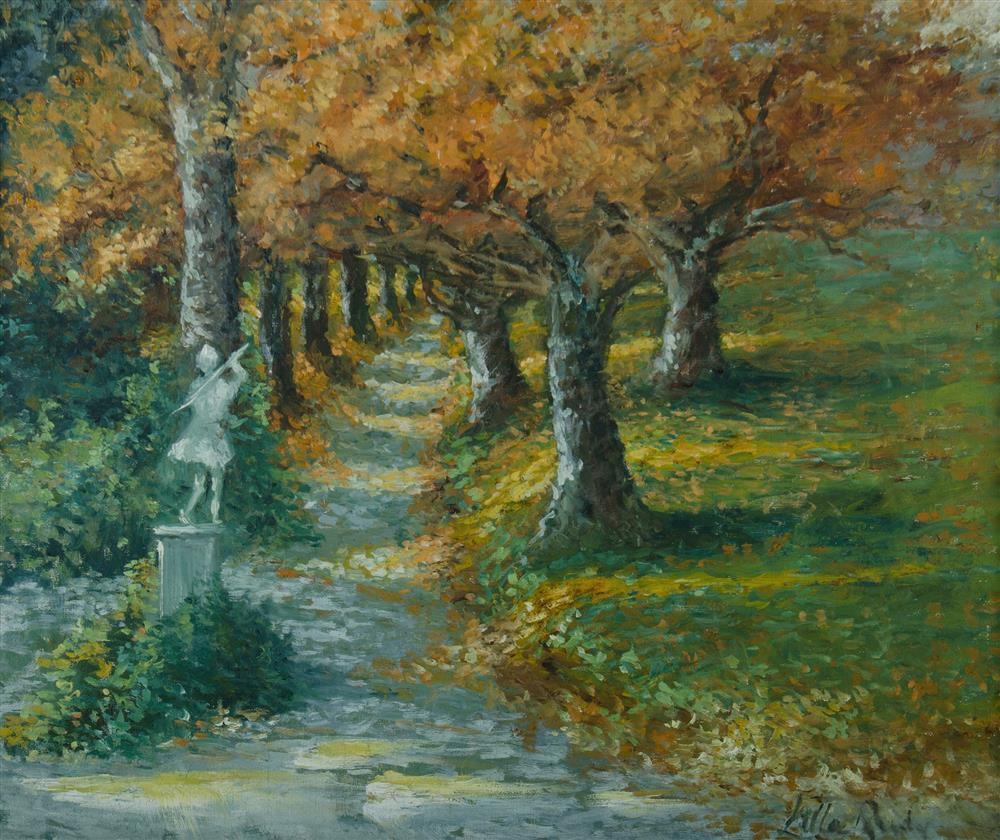
Painting by Reidy of Fitzroy Gardens, Melbourne

Reidy was born in Hobart, Tasmania in Australia in 1858. Her father, Thomas P. Reidy, was in charge of the Hobart gaol. In the 1880s she taught painting in Hobart. Around 1890 she moved to Charterisville, a property in Ivanhoe, Victoria, which is closely associated with the Heidelberg School of Australian art. There, she studied at Australia's first recognised summer school of art, which was run by E. Phillips Fox and Tudor St. George Tucker between 1893 and 1901. She became Fox's assistant and he painted her portrait. Reidy later had a studio in Bourke Street, Melbourne where Fox and Tucker had their main school, with the summer school, devoted to ‘plein air’ painting, being held in Charterisville for two months every autumn from 1897.

Reidy exhibited often with the Victorian Artists' Society between 1895 and 1910. At the first Australian Exhibition of Women's Work, held in Melbourne in 1907, she showed several pieces including two copper repoussé plates. During the First World War, she was among the artists who painted pictures on gum leaves for people to send to soldiers serving overseas. The Melbourne Punch reported that she was the president of a group of about 30 women who met regularly to make small banners of white calico, on which were painted emblems and battalion colours. These were sold to raise money for soldiers' charities such as the 1915 Australia Day Sick and Wounded Appeal. After the war she continued to paint patriotic souvenirs, often on watered silk, to raise money for war widows and their children. These often consisted of the name, battalion, and colours of soldiers, with their number in a laurel wreath of gold, and a sprig of gum blossom. Leidy and those she worked with are believed to have produced around a thousand of these items.

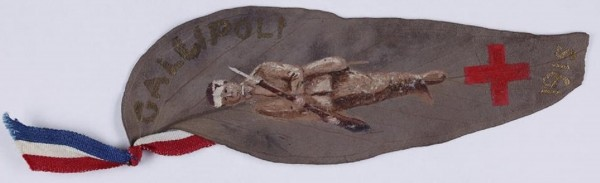
Leaf drawing by Reidy

== Death ==
Reidy died on 27 November 1933 in South Yarra, Melbourne. She was buried in the Springvale Botanical Cemetery.
