= Tudor St George Tucker =

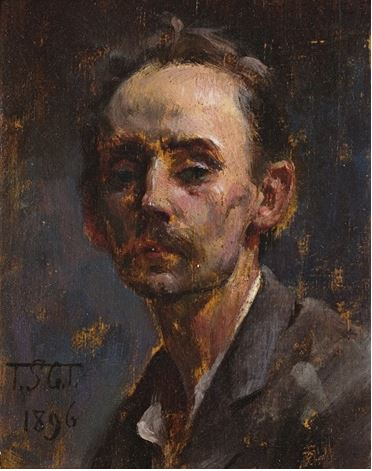
- Self-portrait (1896)
- Born: 28 April 1862; London, United Kingdom
- Died: 21 December 1906 (aged 44); London, United Kingdom

Tudor St George Tucker (28 April 1862 – 21 December 1906) was an English painter who spent a large part of his short life in Australia. He was best known for his landscapes and portraits of women.

== Biography ==
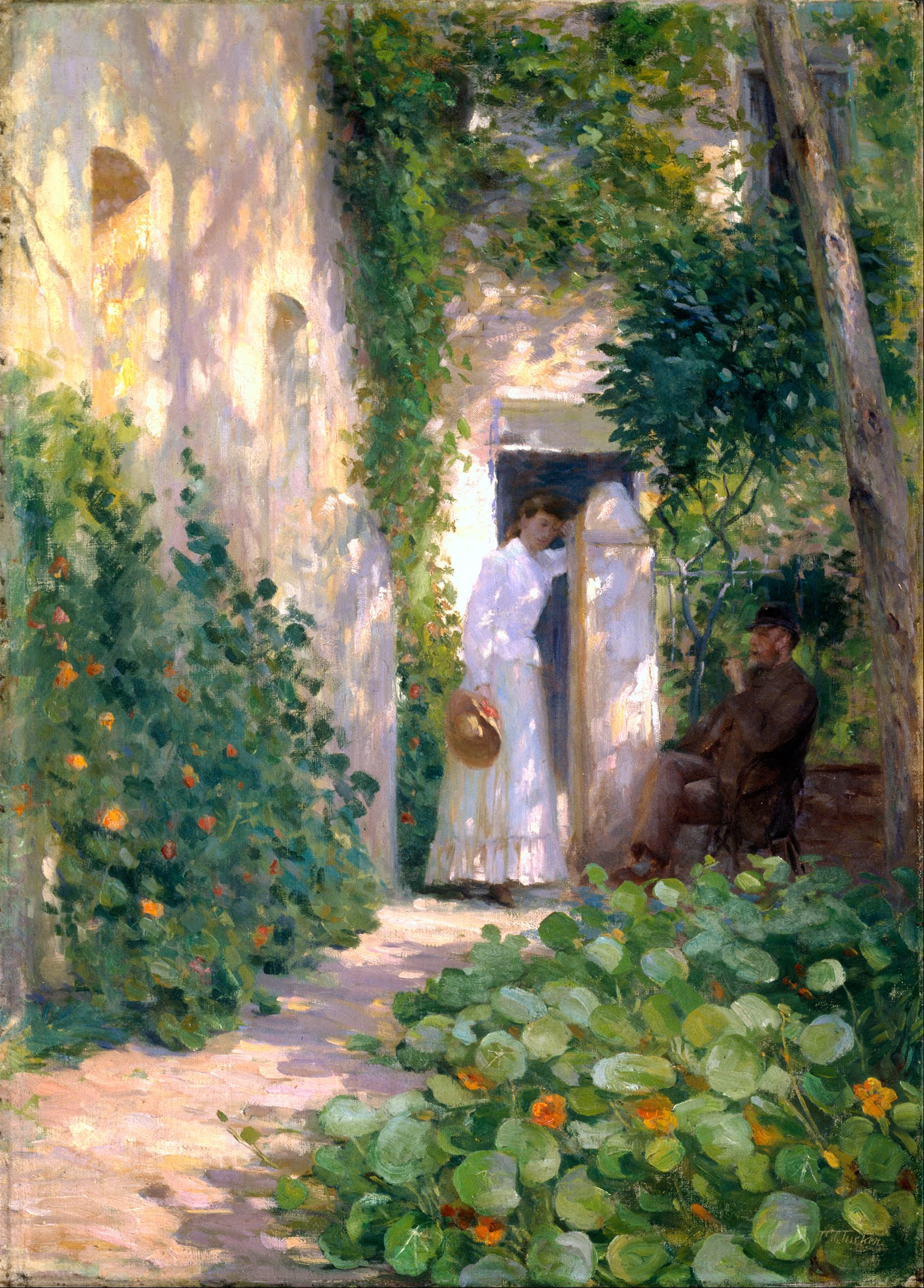
Nasturtiums, 1903, National Gallery of Australia

He was the son of Captain Charlton Nassau Tucker, a retired Bengal Cavalry officer. His grandfather, Henry St George Tucker, had served as Chairman of the East India Company. Much against his family's wishes, he chose to become an artist. Always a rather sickly child, he went to Melbourne in 1881 in search of a healthier climate. He studied at the National Gallery School from 1883 to 1887 under George Frederick Folingsby, winning several prizes for drawing. He also taught to support himself and exhibited at the Victorian Academy of Arts.

He returned to Europe in 1887, where he joined his friend, E. Phillips Fox at the Académie Julian and, later, at the École des Beaux Arts, Paris; winning a gold medal. He was a regular visitor to the Etaples art colony, where he produced his first major works. His debut exhibition at the Salon came in 1891. The following year, he went back to Melbourne, set up a studio in Flinders Street and, from 1893 to 1899, ran the Melbourne School of Art together with Fox., where the students included Ina Gregory (1874-1964), Bertha Merfield, Ambrose Patterson, Mary Meyer and Violet Teague, many of whom attended their summer schools at Charterisville.

The Australian climate did little or nothing for his failing health, so he decided to return home to London in 1899. He also exhibited in Liverpool and Birmingham. Tucker died on 21 December 1906 of tuberculosis in London. He suffered much from his ill health and painted relatively little.

He is represented in the National Gallery of Victoria, the National Gallery of Australia, Canberra, and Warrnambool Art Gallery.
