= Edward Officer =

Australian artist

Edward Cairns Officer
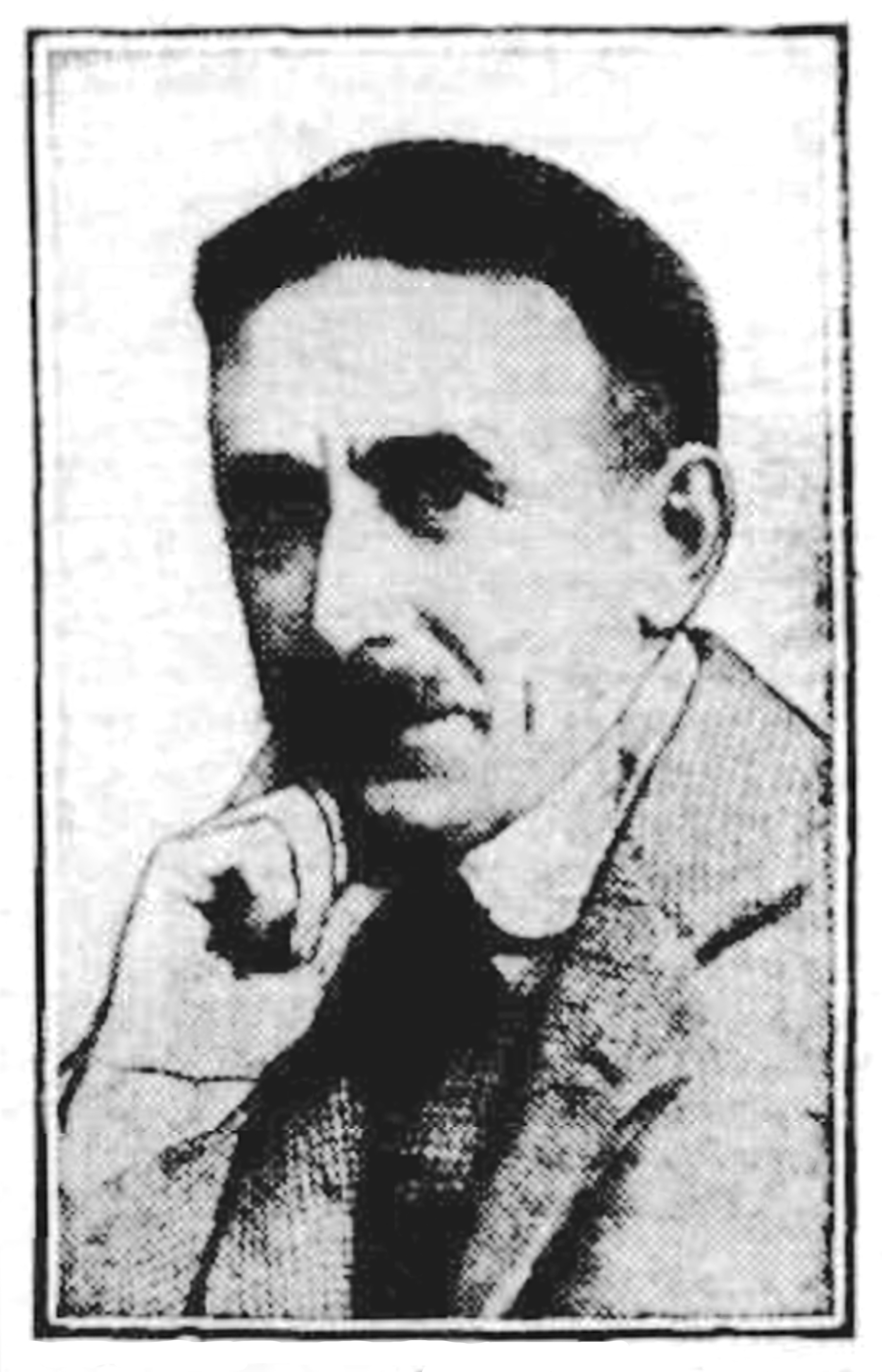
- Edward Cairns Officer, c. 1921
- Born: 19 September 1871; Murray Downs, NSW, Australia
- Died: 7 July 1921 (aged 49); Macedon, Victoria
- Occupation: Artist

Edward Cairns Officer (19 September 1871 – 7 July 1921) was an Australian landscape painter and president of the Australian Art Association.

== Early life and education ==
Officer was born in 1871 at Murray Downs, New South Wales, near Swan Hill, Victoria. He studied art under Frederick McCubbin at the National Gallery of Victoria and studied at Julian's in Paris, in 1895. In 1908, he married Grace, daughter of Sir Thomas Fitzgerald.

== Australian Art Association ==
Officer was elected the inaugural president of the Australian Art Association, which broke away from the Victorian Artists Society and held its first exhibition in 1913. Edward Officer became its Secretary in 1914, but resumed the presidency, replaced after his death by Norman Macgeorge.

Unable to enlist to serve in World War I, in 1916 Officer organised the sale of 95 of his paintings netting £800 for the Red Cross Fund.

In 1920, Officer, as President of the Association, in a letter to The Argus, represented its opposition to the import duty then being imposed on art from abroad, remarking that "This year it happens that many of the Australian artists who have made names for themselves in England and Europe will come to us with exhibitions of their work, and will be, as Mr [Arthur] Streeton was, confronted with this ridiculous duty."

Subsequently, the Association's deputation in June to the Customs Minister discovered that he had conceded, and that works of Australian artists and art students residing less than five years abroad would be free of import duty.

Officer exhibited with the Association annually at its shows held at the Melbourne Athenaeum and during the 1919 exhibition, the members dined at J. Richardson's 'Café Francais' at 257 Little Collins St. to honour their President, Edward Officer and to toast soldier artists. New Gallery in May 1928 held a posthumous retrospective of his work, the opening of which was attended by John Longstaff, Clewin Harcourt and Rupert Bunny.

Officer died at Macedon, Victoria, on 7 July 1921.

== Collections ==
The Art Gallery of New South Wales holds two landscape by Officer

== Gallery of paintings by Edward Officer ==
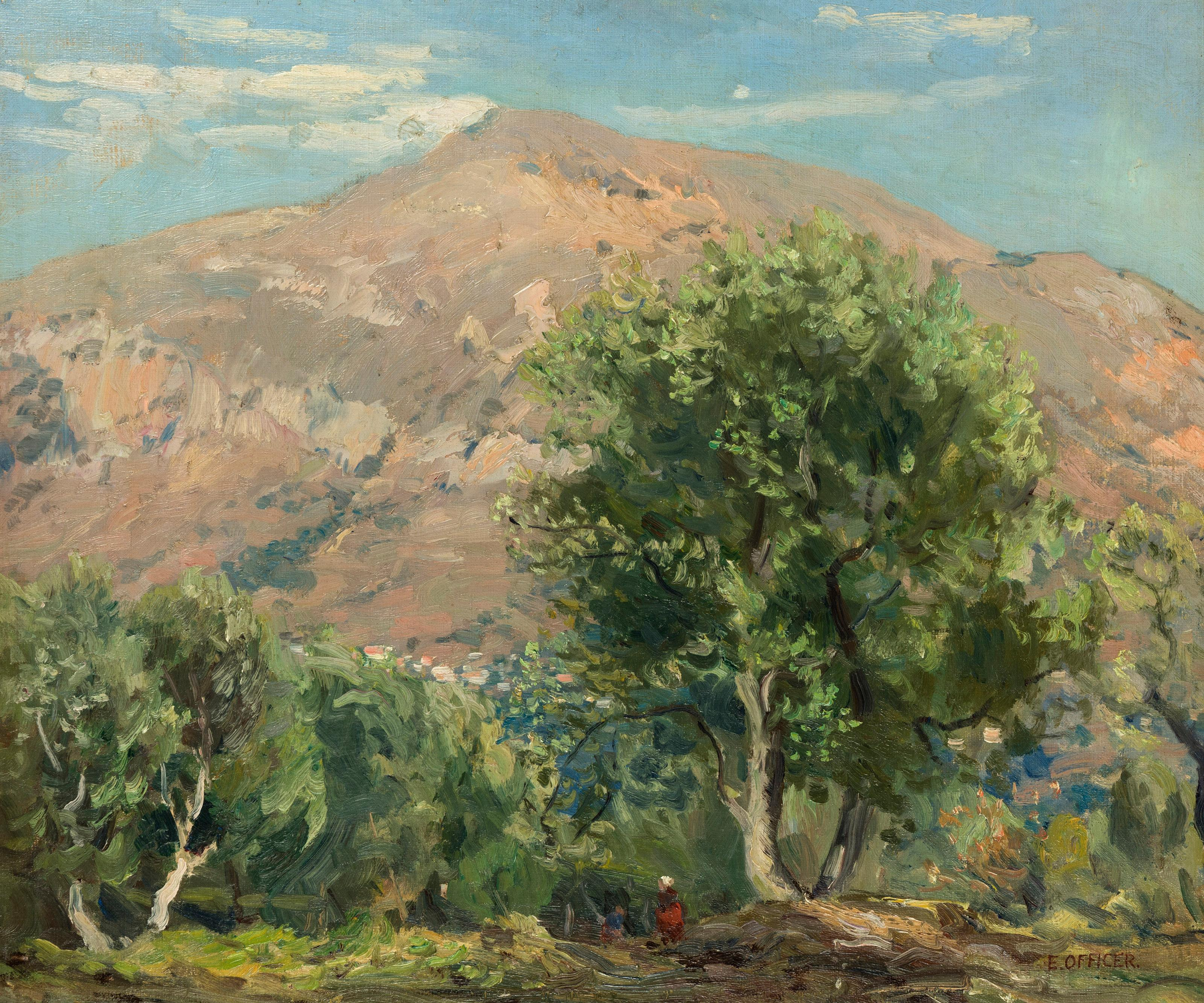
Edward Officer On a bush track, oil on board, signed lower right, 47 x 55cm

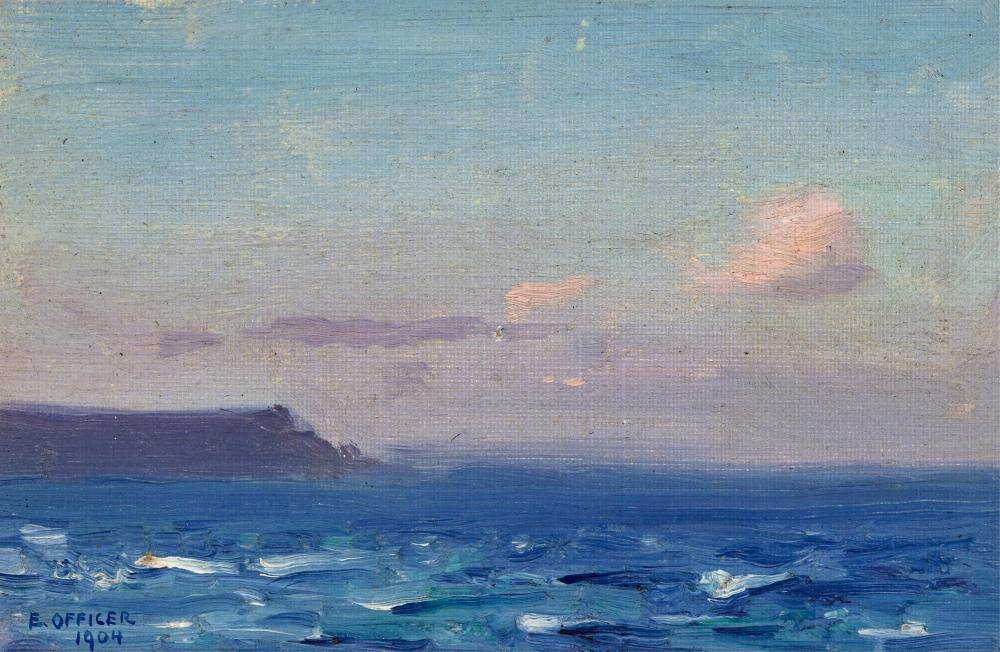
Edward Officer (1904) untitled, oil on board signed and dated lower left

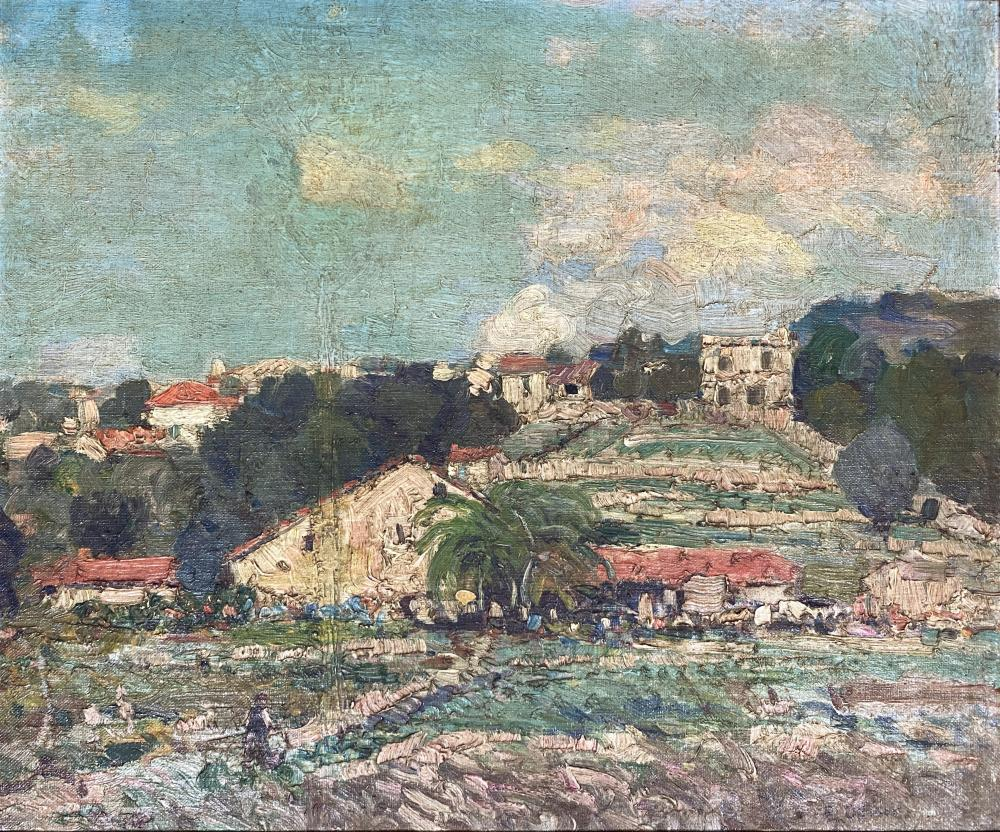
Edward Officer Cairns Australia, (before 1922) Market Gardens, Southern France. Oil on canvas laid on board. Signed lower right

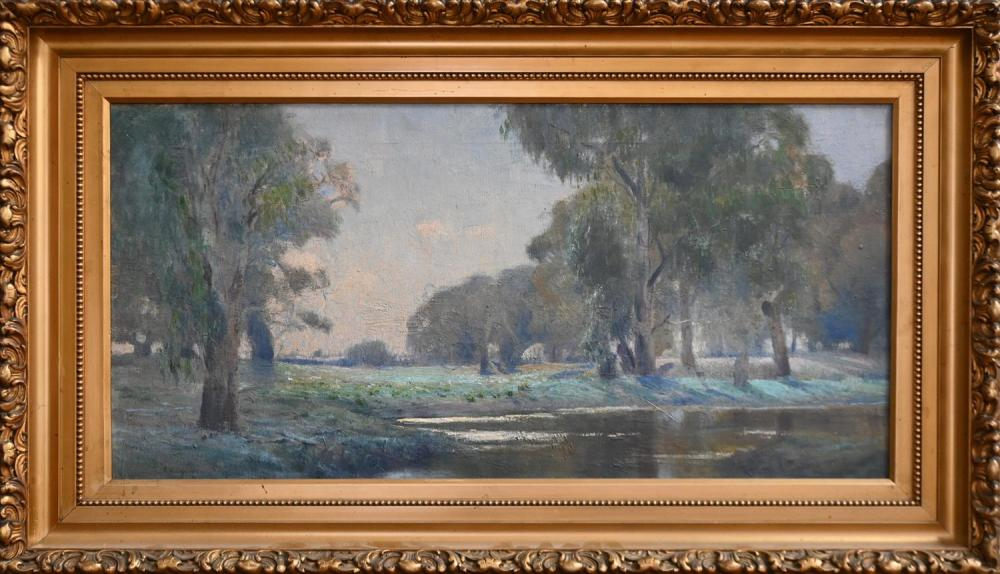
Edward Officer (1906) Kallara. Oil on canvas, 37x75.5cm

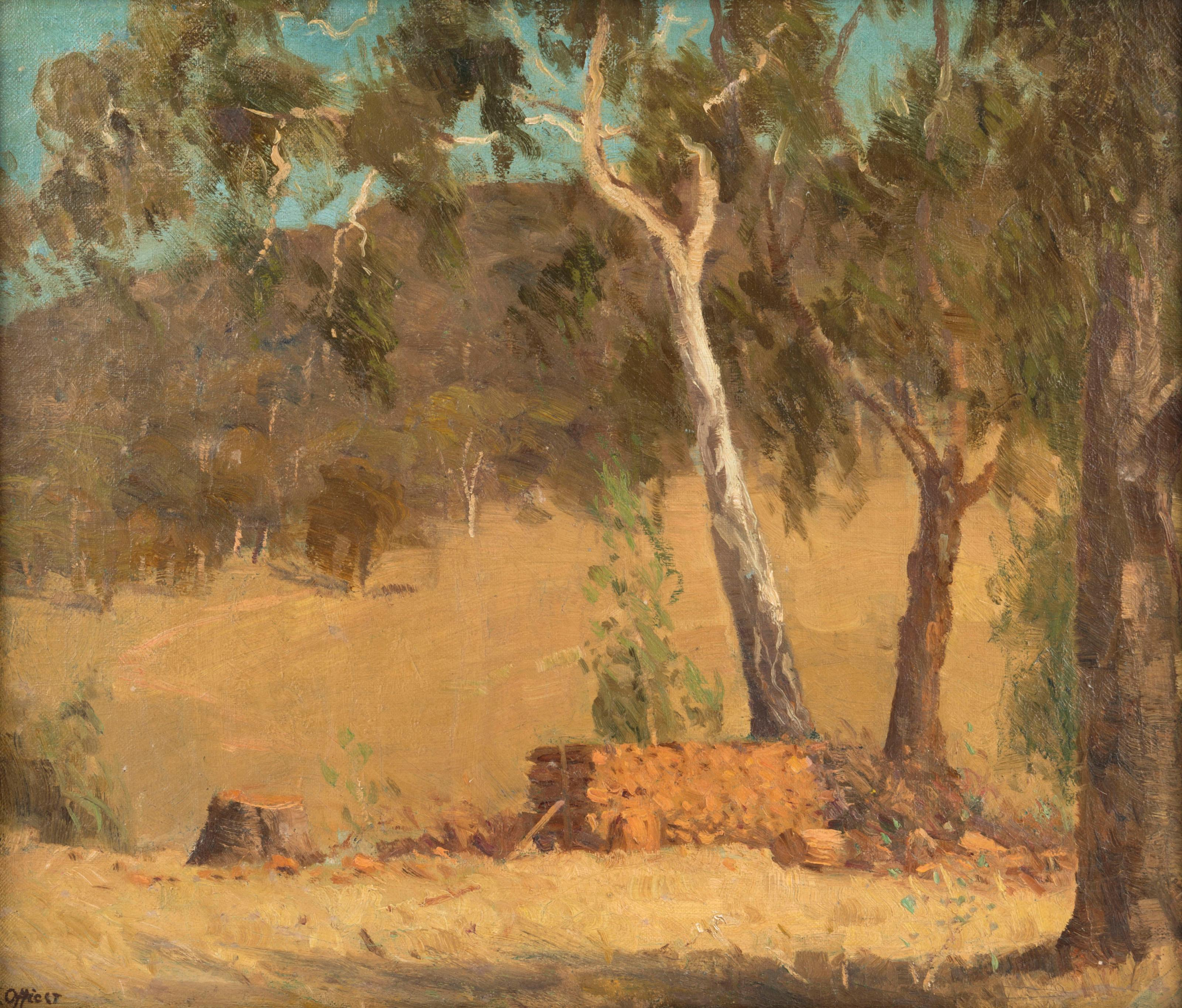
Edward Officer (n.d.), (the wood stack), oil on canvas on board, 45 x 54cm

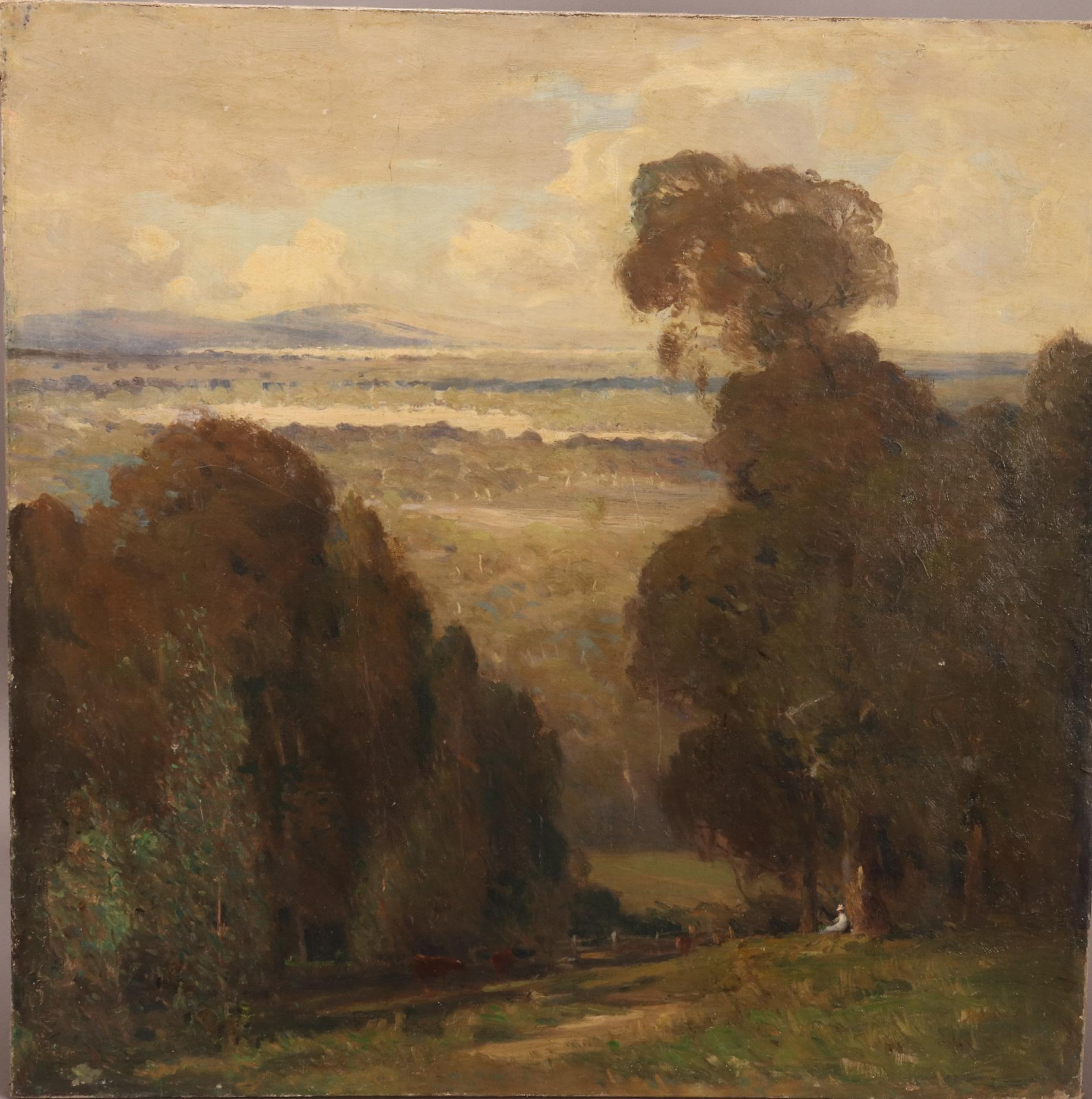
Edward Officer (n.d.) The Dandenongs, towards Lilydale oil on canvas 83cm x 83cm

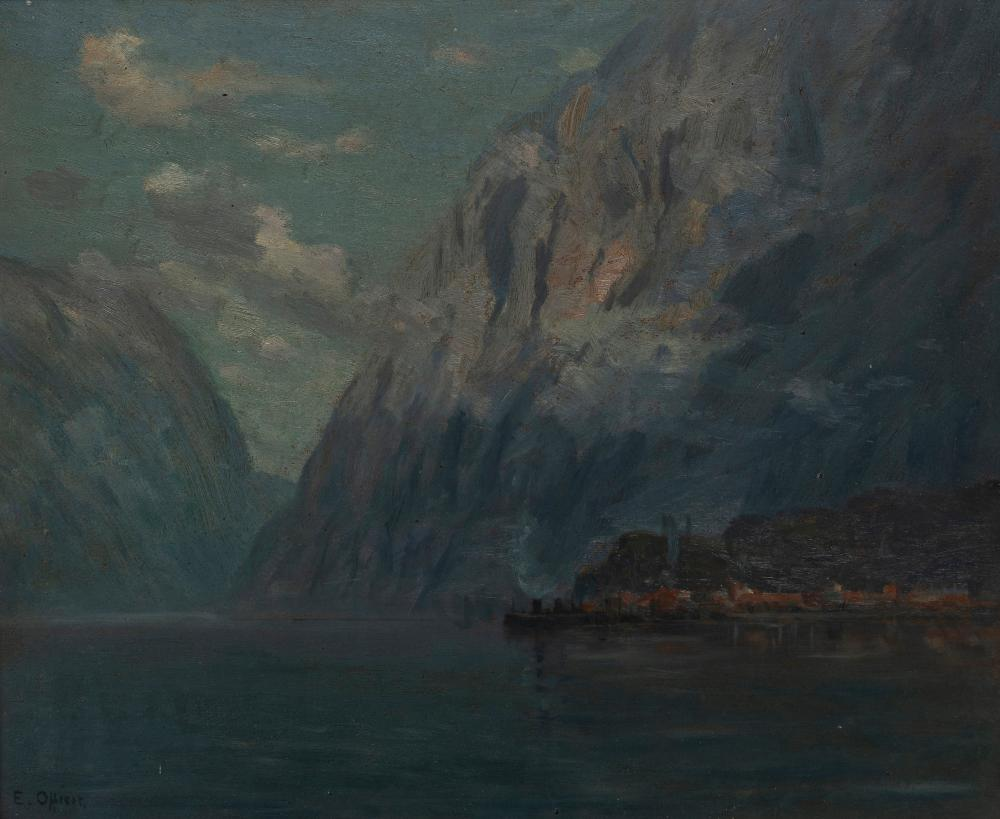
E Officer (n.d.) Lake Scene, oil on board 36.5 x 44.5cm
