= Patricia Englund =

Australian potter

Patricia Englund, née Burge, (1922–2004) was an Australian potter and artist from Sans Souci, New South Wales.

== Career ==
Patricia first studied painting at the Julian Ashton School in Sydney before she took pottery lessons at Wollongong Technical College, where she was taught by her husband Ivan Englund. In 1955 after quickly developing as a highly skilled potter using a small wood-burning kiln, Patricia also went on to teach ceramics at the college. Patricia's works are held in collections at the National Gallery of Victoria, the Powerhouse Museum in Sydney and the National Gallery of Australia. Her items of pottery have been exhibited in the Western Australia Art Gallery and Newcastle Teachers College as well as in New Zealand, Philippines, Japan, Hong Kong and Thailand.

== Exhibitions ==
- Macquarie Galleries: 5–17 November 1958; December 1959; November 1962
- Four Arts in Australia 1962
- National Gallery of Victoria 1963–64.
- Stoneware by Patricia Englund 1966
- Bonython Art Gallery 1969
- Christmas Art Exhibition, Blaxland Gallery 1970
- Mitchell Regional Art Gallery 1973 (Permanent Collection)
- A Collection of Australian Women Artists Duvance Galleries 1978
- Bathurst Regional Gallery 1995

== Prizes ==
- Hunters Hill Prize for potter in 1961 and 1966
- Mirror-Waratah Prize in 1965
- Royal Easter Show 1969, Art, Sculpture and Human Image Exhibitions
- The Transfield Art Prize 1969
