= Josephine Muntz Adams =

Australian woman portraitist 1862–1949

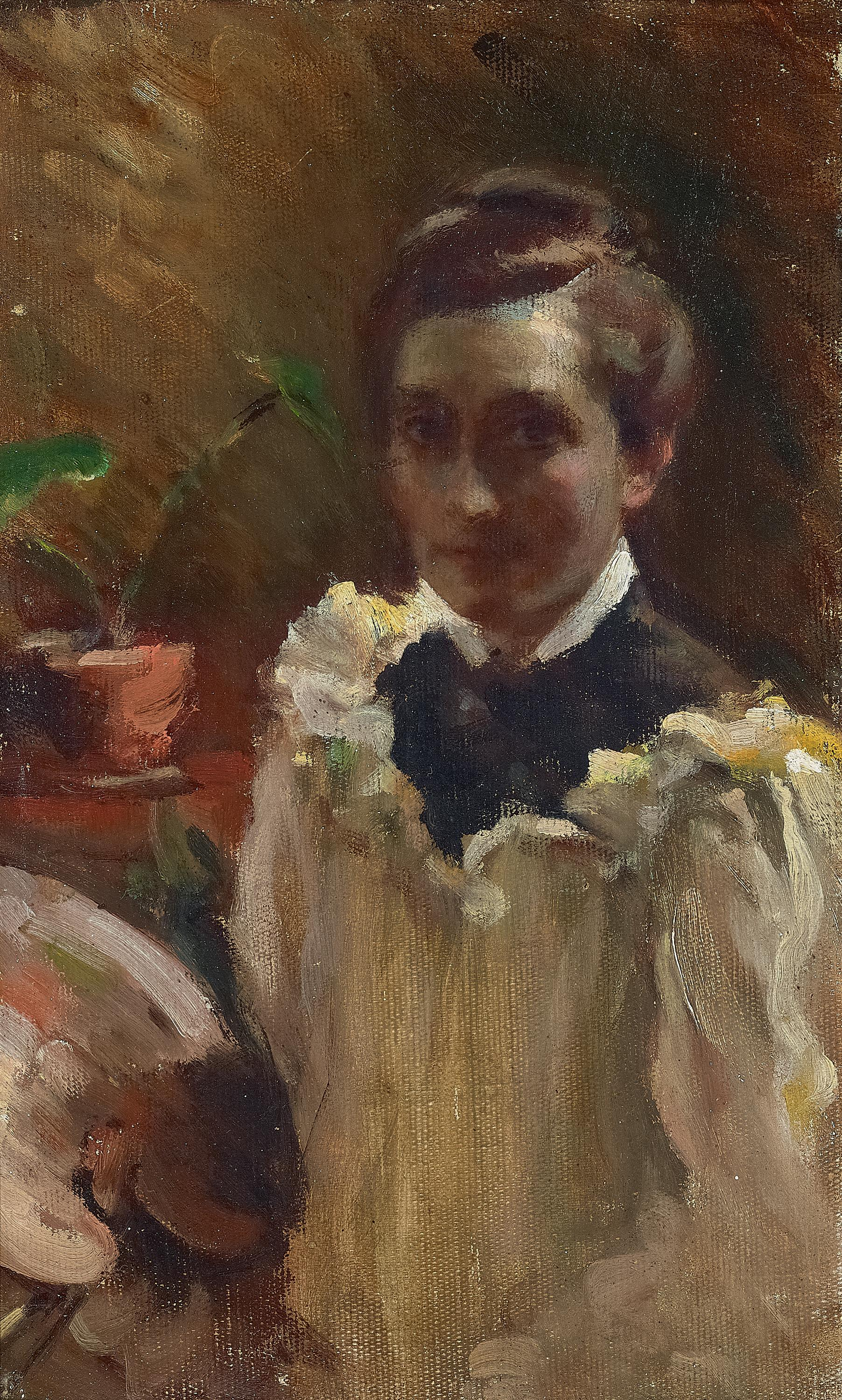
- Self-portrait c.1896 oil on canvas 31.0 x 19.0 cm
- Born: 1862; Barfold, Victoria, Australia
- Died: 1949 (aged 86–87); Windsor, Victoria, Australia
- Education: National Gallery of Victoria Art School, Melbourne; Académie Colarossi, Paris; Herkomer Art School, England
- Known for: Painter, Portraitist, Teacher
- Awards: Award for portraiture, Greater Britain Exhibition, Earl’s Court, London, 1899

Josephine Margaret Muntz Adams (1862 –1949) was an Australian artist and art teacher who trained in Australia and Europe and distinguished herself as a portraitist. Her works are represented in many national and state collections, including her portraits of Duncan Gillies, 14th Premier of the state of Victoria (1886–1890), at Parliament House, Melbourne, and of the Queensland and Australian Federal politician Charles McDonald, in Parliament House, Canberra.

== Early life and training ==
In 1861, Jane Jamieson married Thomas Bingham Muntz who after his arrival in Victoria and two years on the goldfields without success, had taken a farm on the Barfold Estate, about 11 miles north of Kyneton. Their first child, Josephine Margaret, was born the next year. Nine siblings were to follow.

The family moved to Prahran, where Thomas Muntz then held the position of town surveyor, then Civil Engineer, and supervised the building of the Coode Canal. Her mother Jane supported the suffragette movement, and her younger sister is noted as an early female science graduate of the University of Melbourne.

Muntz Adams enrolled aged fourteen at the Prahran School of Design where in 1877 she was awarded first prize for her landscape in the senior division awards, and a second at the state-wide Schools of Design Awards, Ballarat, and the Mayor's Special Prize for Oil painting. In October 1879 she passed her Matriculation at the University of Melbourne, and in December qualified for admission into the civil service. Instead, Josephine, who was also a gifted pianist, opted to train at the National Gallery of Victoria Art School under George Folingsby in 1882 and 1884-1889, studying with Clara Southern, Jane Sutherland, May Vale, Lucy Walker, Abbey Altson, David Davies, Frank Powne, Emily A. Thomas, Henrietta Irvine, Livington Evans, Sarah Collis, and Arthur Streeton. Care, painted in 1887 as her major student exercise was reportedly the first purchase of an Australian artist's work by the Queensland National Art Gallery, Brisbane, and her Weary, a tired mother watching over her sick child gained second prize in the 1888 exhibition of the NGV School.

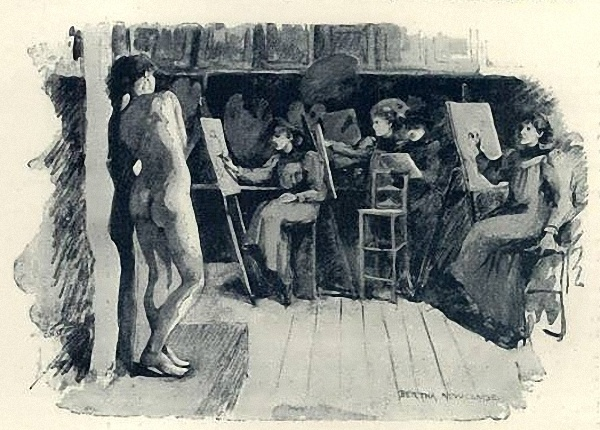
Women students at a life class in the Académie Colarossi, 1894, by Bertha Newcombe

== Europe ==
Josephine traveled to Europe to study, during 1890 to 1896, under leading exponents of contemporary French and English Impressionism and portraiture. She toured the continental galleries, and enrolled at the Académie Colarossi in Paris, and in England at Herkomer's Art School, where she felt she made most progress and gained most 'real knowledge' among over 200 other artists including Australian students Kathleen O'Connor, Blamire Young and the Tasmanian Mary Augusta Walker who worked in the surrounds of the village Bushey. Herkomer praised her work "as more like that of a man than of a woman." Her work was hung in the Paris Salons of 1892 and 1893.

== Australian exhibitions ==
On her return to Australia, Muntz exhibited in October 1896 at the New Zealand Chambers 483 Collins Street Melbourne, the show favourably reviewed by James Smith in The Age, also in The Australasian, and was the subject of a profile and a critique of her work in Table Talk, which praised her talent for portrait painting in discussion of four works highlighting her skill; the strong modelling and expressive accuracy evident in her portrait of the Hon. Duncan Gillies, her depiction of Mr. Charles Young (Victorian MLA for Kyneton) capturing his honesty and warmth with striking realism, and her full-length portrait of Miss Carrie Chambers, ambitious for its delicate skin tones and fine textures in clothing. Her portrait of Mrs. Curle Smith was considered advanced in its successful use of yellow "which few artists dare to paint" against a grey background. Another work, Be Careful, of an elderly peasant woman, powerfully conveyed a life of hardship. The article concludes that additional portraits, flower pieces, and Cornish landscapes, "prove Miss Muntz's capacity for hard and continuous work, and at the same time make her future a matter of much interest."

Muntz departed again for Europe on the SS Innamincka in August 1897.

== Career ==
On 25 August 1898 at her parents home in Malvern, Josephine Muntz married Brisbane businessman Samuel Howard Adams, who had migrated form Portglenone, county Antrim, Ireland. She was aged 36 and already an established artist. The couple left Victoria for Brisbane, Queensland, and lived at Adaroni, in the Jubilee Estate, around Fernberg in Ithaca, where he stood as Labour candidate for the Balonne electorate and she continued to paint, teach and exhibit; her life-size portrait of R. J. L. Ellery, Government Astronomer, was presented to him at an August 1902 meeting of the Surveyors' Institute. She also visited her brother in Coolgardie, Western Australia, and painted there, too.

Muntz's mother died in 1902, and then her 37-year-old husband Samuel Adams who, having suffered for some months previous from kidney stones suffered a fatal seizure, dying at home on 20 March 1903. An obituary was published in The Worker noting his support for the labour movement and that his funeral was attended by representatives of The Worker, the Australian Labour Federation, Central Political Executive, the Social-Democratic Vanguard, and the Queensland Art Society.

Josephine subsequently returned to her home state of Victoria where her father died in 1908, and from 1905-1908 was elected a council member of the Victorian Artists' Society (with which she exhibited 1896–1915) and was re-elected for 1912-1913. Burke notes that "in 1905, the year that May Vale, ‘Jo’ Sweatman, Josephine Muntz-Adams and Clara Southern were council members, the number of female exhibitors at the Victorian Artists Society winter exhibition was fifty-seven out of a total of 100 artists. In 1917 she returned to live and work in Brisbane for five years, until 1922. While there she was appointed part-time teacher of freehand drawing and painting at the Central Technical College, Brisbane, resumed her contact with the Royal Queensland Art Society, known then as the Queensland Art Society, and served on the management committee for three years and associated with the Brisbane Lyceum Club at Bible House, George Street. She resigned from the technical college in mid-1922 and returned to Melbourne.

Professional success led to financial success; Muntz-Adams' work sold for high prices. By 1911 she had purchased newly established real estate: lots 5 and 6 in Tollington Avenue in the inner city suburb of East Melbourne. These she rented out, whilst she lived in nearby lot 9, which she kept until her death in 1949.

In 1930 a Brisbane Courier journalist remarked that a critic reviewing the annual exhibition of the Victorian Artists' Society identified "as one of the most distinguished works in the collection, a self-portrait by Mrs. Muntz-Adams."

== Legacy ==
Josephine's last commission was a life-size portrait of Archbishop Duhig, of Brisbane, though she suffered poor health and failing eyesight in her later years. In 1943 a retrospective exhibition was held at the Athenaeum Gallery, Melbourne.

After her death in Victoria, at the age of 87, Muntz Adams was buried with her husband in Toowong Cemetery in Brisbane.

Muntz Street in the Canberra suburb of Chisholm is named in her honour.

== Exhibitions ==
- 1896, October: solo exhibition, New Zealand Chambers, 483 Collins Street Melbourne
- 1896, October: Victorian Artists Society group exhibition
- 1897: Queensland International Exhibition, receiving a first prize in Class 2 of the Fine Art sections for her portrait in oils
- 1897, September: Alice Chapman's studio, New Zealand Chambers, 483 Collins Street Melbourne
- 1898, July: Tenth exhibition of the Queensland Art Society
- 1899: Greater Britain Exhibition, Earl's Court, London Gold medal, awarded to Josephine M. Adams for Portrait in oil of the Hon. Duncan Gillies
- 1902, November: Albert Hall, Brisbane
- 1905: Victorian Artists's Society winter exhibition
- 1906, July: Victorian Artists's Society Jubilee Exhibition
- 1907: Annual exhibition, Victorian Artists Society, included George Watson, M.F.H.
- 1907: Australian Exhibition of Women's Work, Exhibition Buildings, Carlton, Victoria
- 1916, May: Victorian Artists Society annual group exhibition
- 1930: Annual Exhibition of the Victorian Artists’ Society, Self portrait
- 1943: Athenaeum Gallery (Melbourne), retrospective solo exhibition

=== Posthumous ===
- 2002: 90th birthday exhibition, Lyceum Club, Melbourne
- 2007: Portrait of an Exhibition: Centenary celebration for the first Australian exhibition of women’s work 1907, Castlemaine Art Gallery
- 2022–23: Beating About the Bush: A new lens on Australian impressionism, Ballarat Art Gallery
- 2025: The School of Paris: Australian artists abroad, Bendigo Art Gallery

== Collections ==
- National Gallery Victoria
- Queensland Art Gallery
- Castlemaine Art Museum
- Bendigo Art Gallery
- Art Gallery of Ballarat
- Art Gallery of Western Australia
- Benalla Art Gallery
- Parliament House, Brisbane
- Parliament House Art Collection, Canberra
- Historic Memorials Collection, Parliament House, Canberra
- Parliament House, Melbourne
- Official website: Josephine Muntz Adams

== Gallery ==
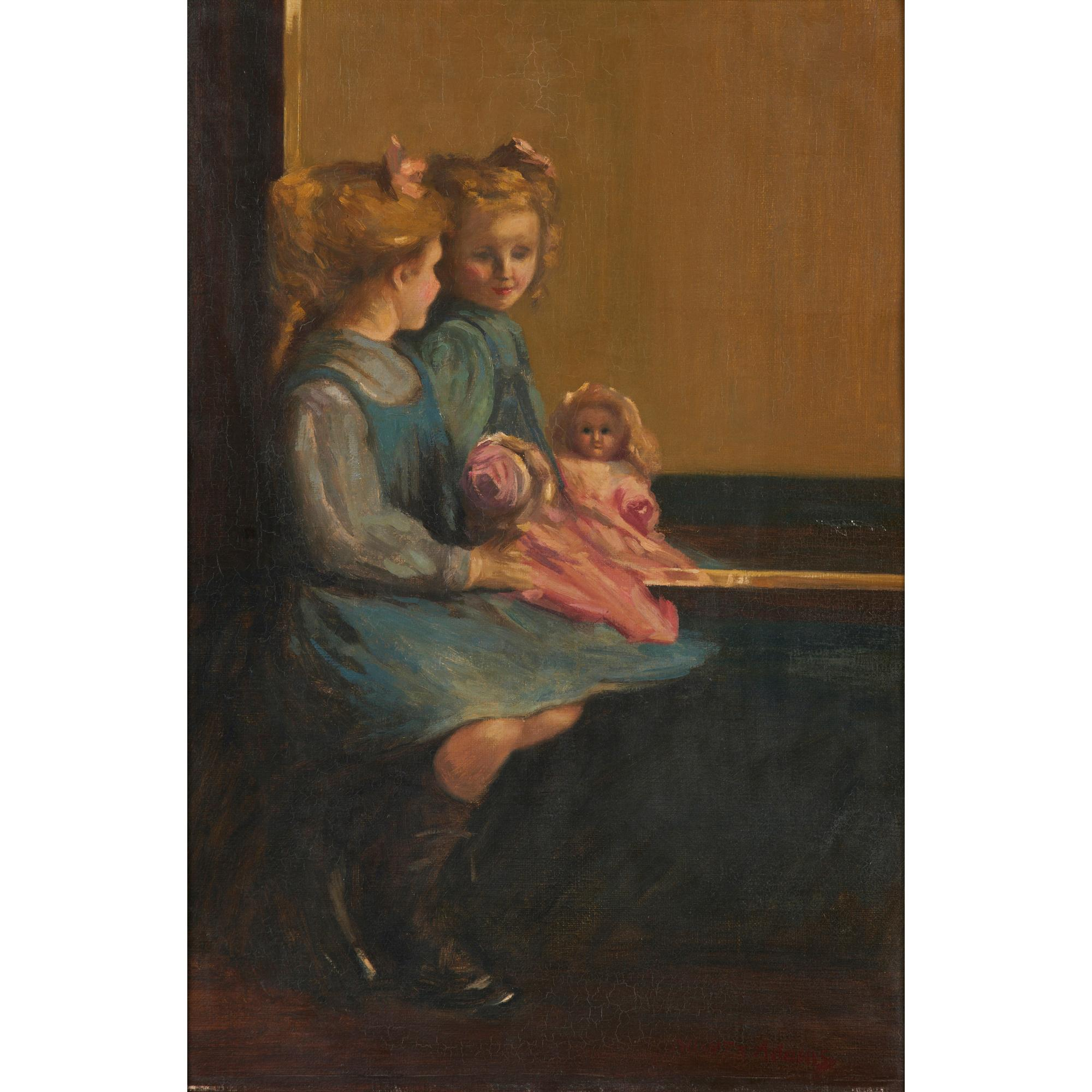
A New Friend, oil on canvas laid on board

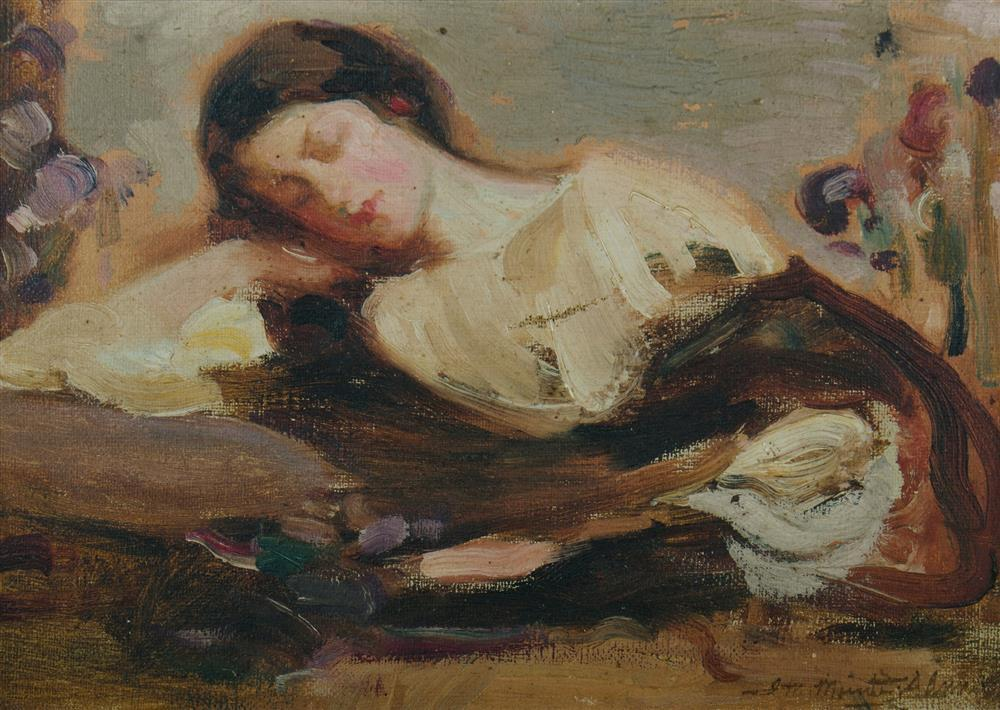
Study for Sleep. Angeloro family collection. Oil on Canvas 16.5x24.5cm

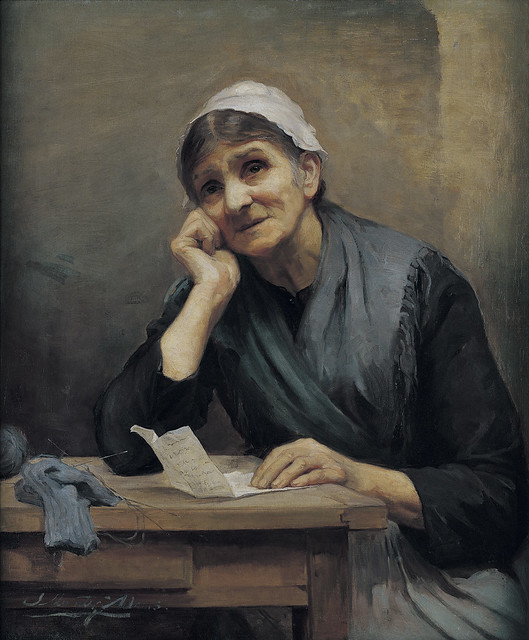
Be careful, ca. 1893, Oil on canvas 83 x 69.3 cm, Queensland Art Gallery

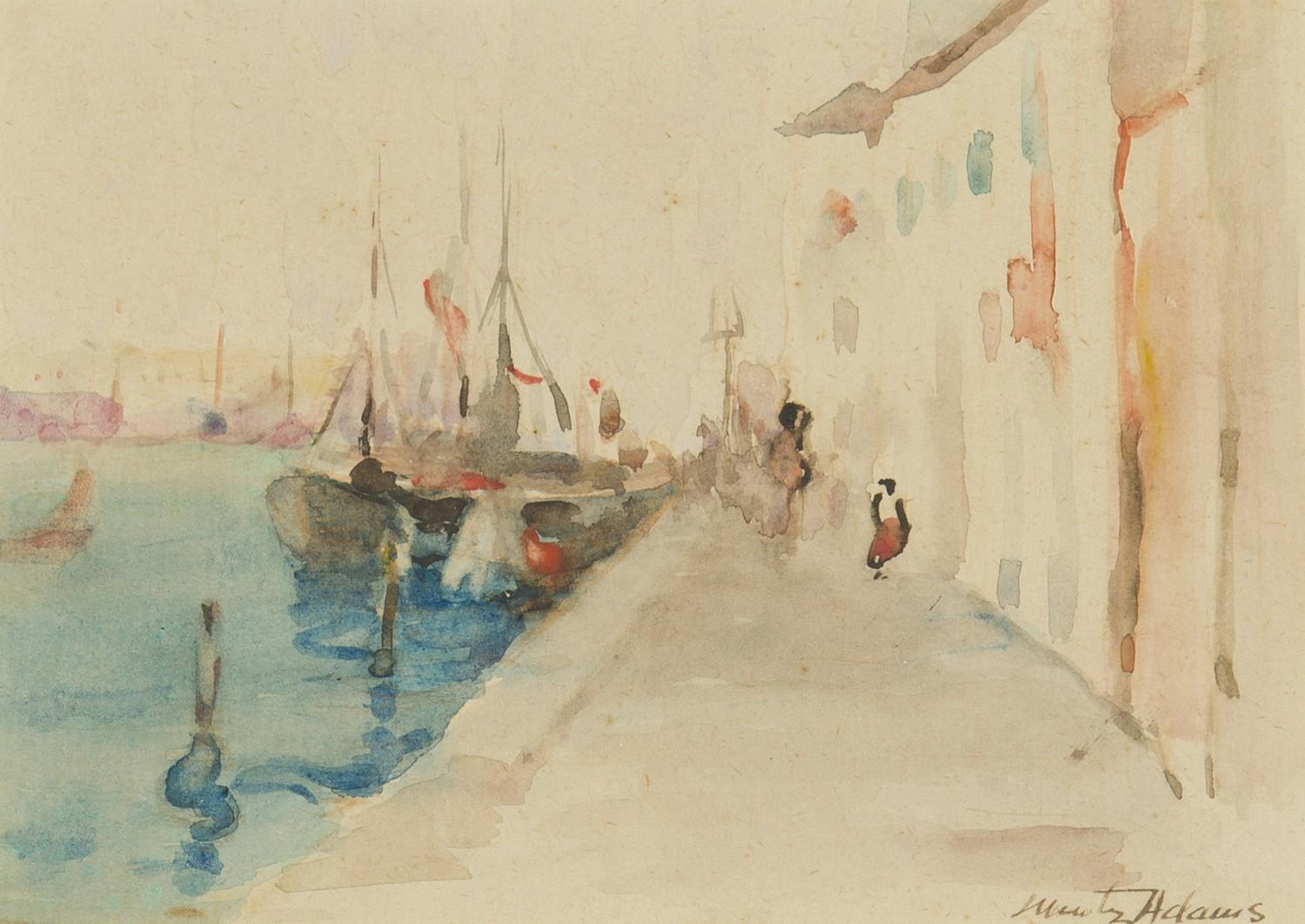
Venice, watercolour on paper, 10 x 15cm

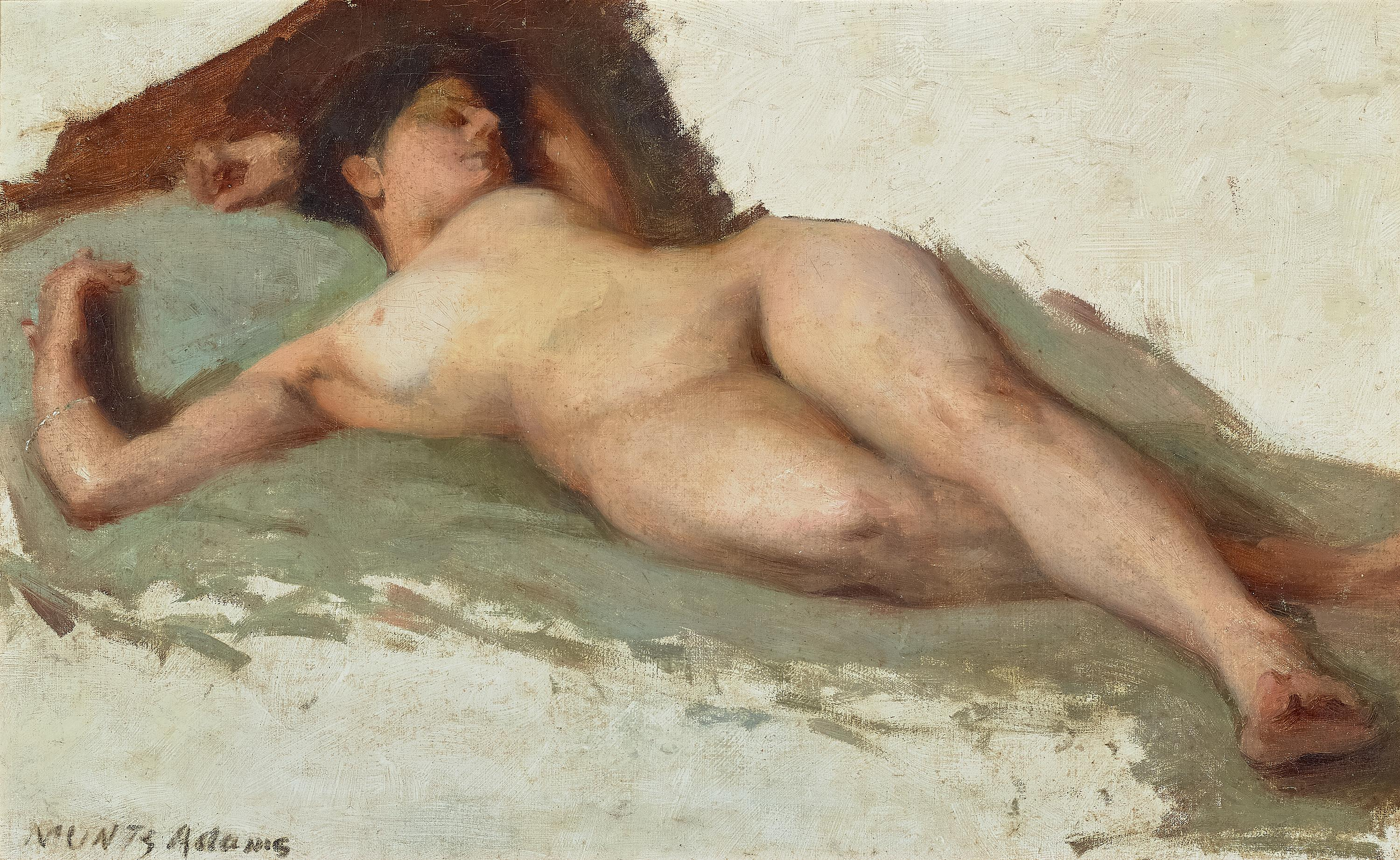
Reclining Nude, oil on canvas on composition board 39.5 x 61.5 cm

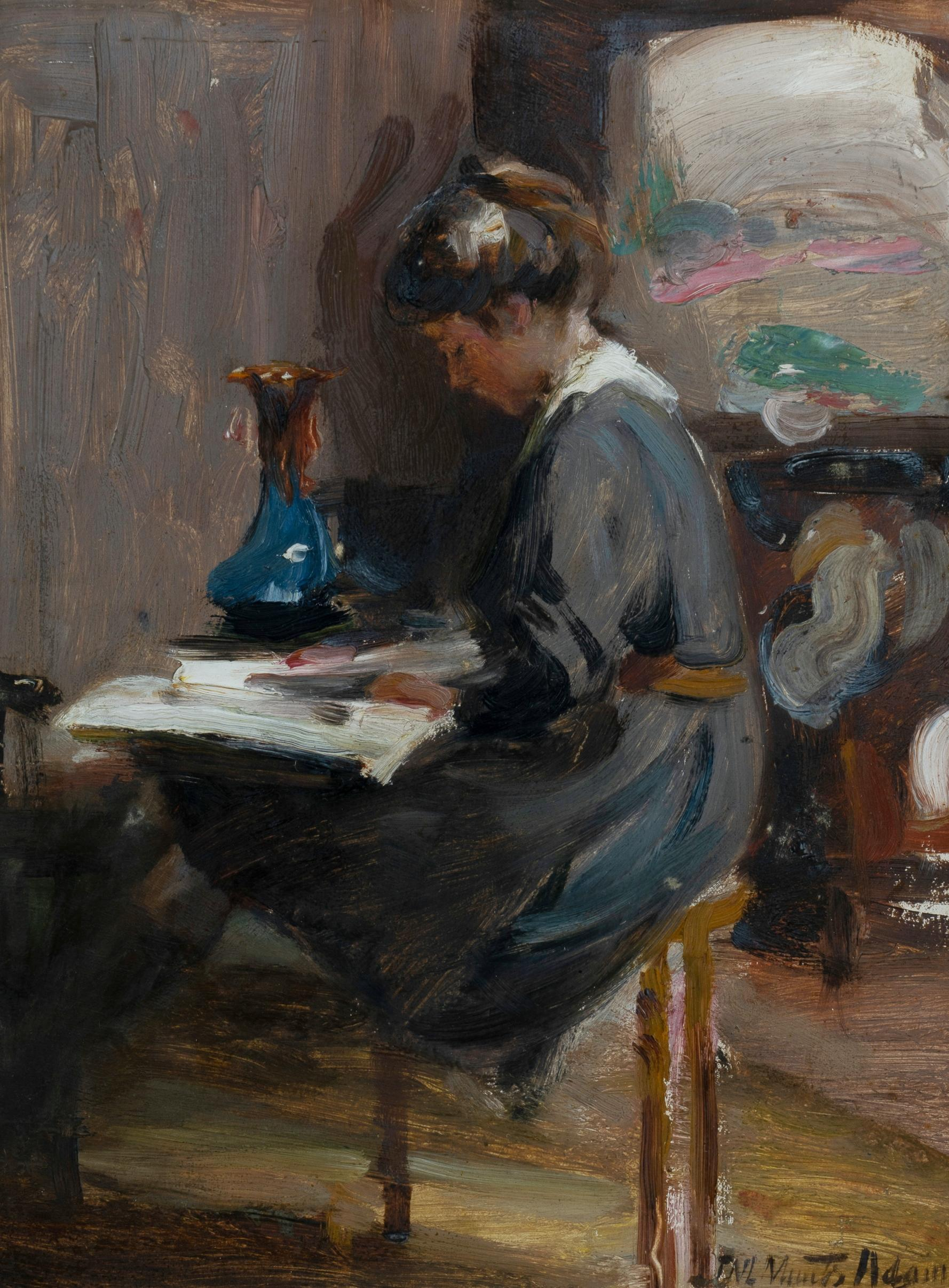
Interior with Woman Reading, Oil on Board 30.5x23.5cm

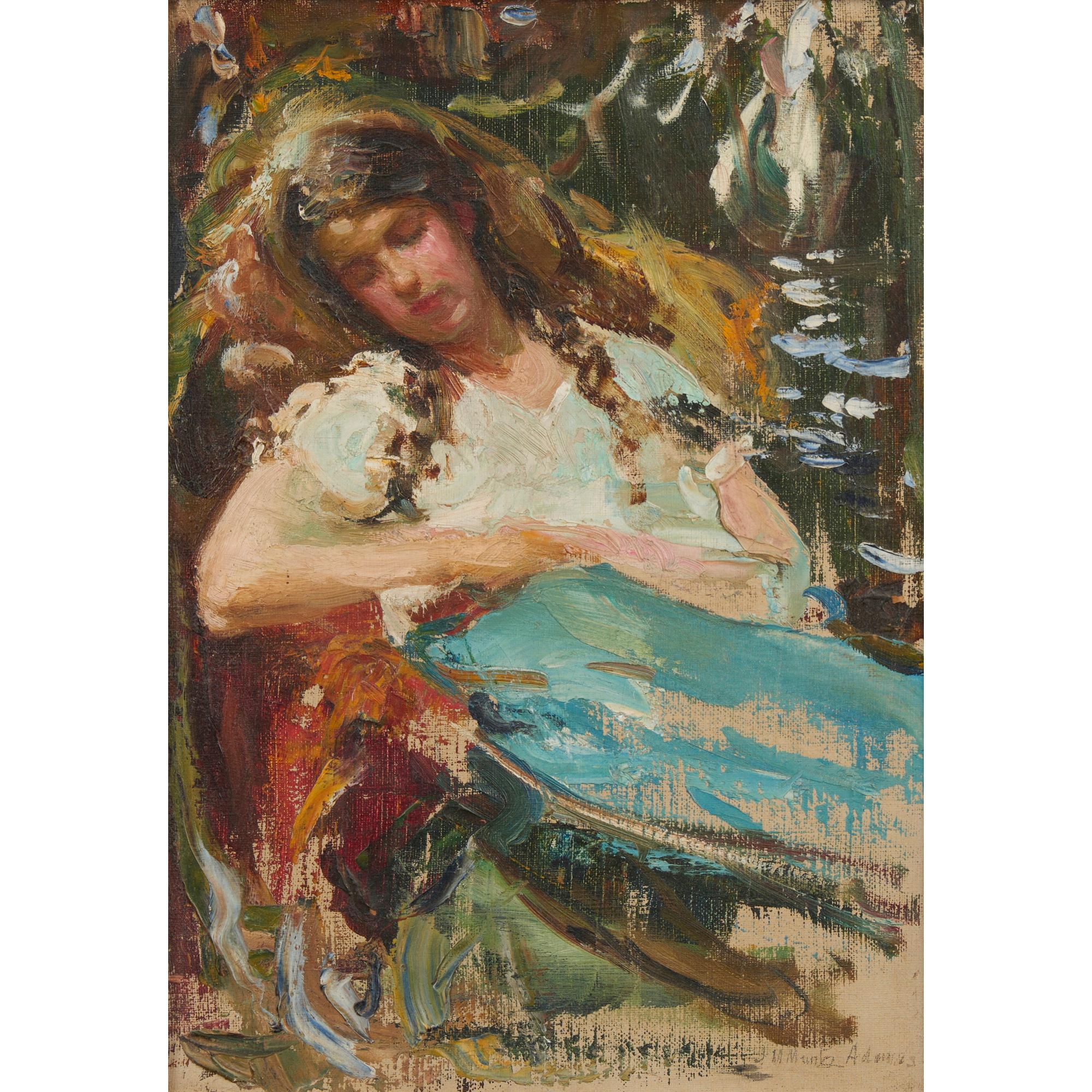
Portrait of a Resting Girl, oil on canvas, 35 x 24.5cm

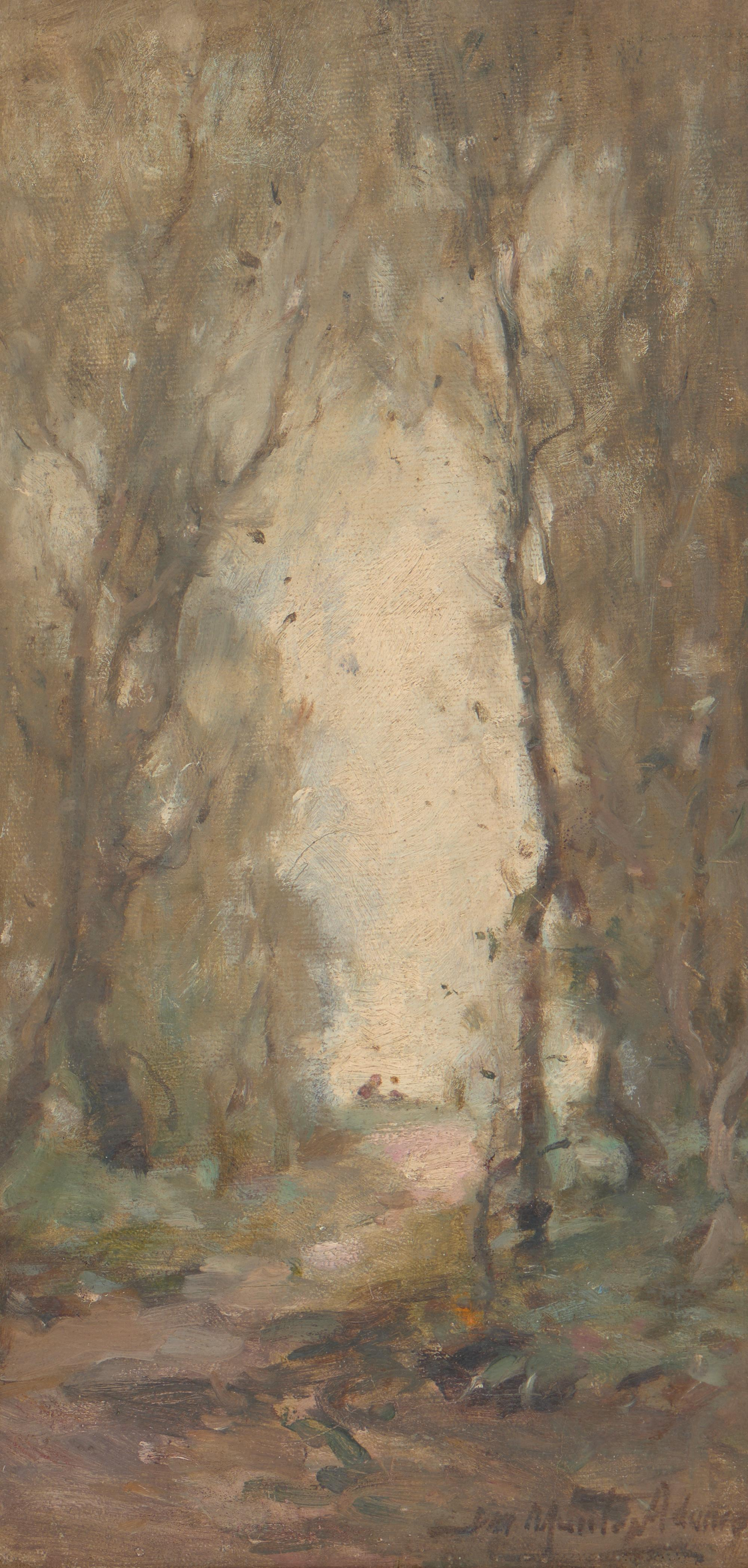
Bushland, oil on canvas, 39.5 x 19cm

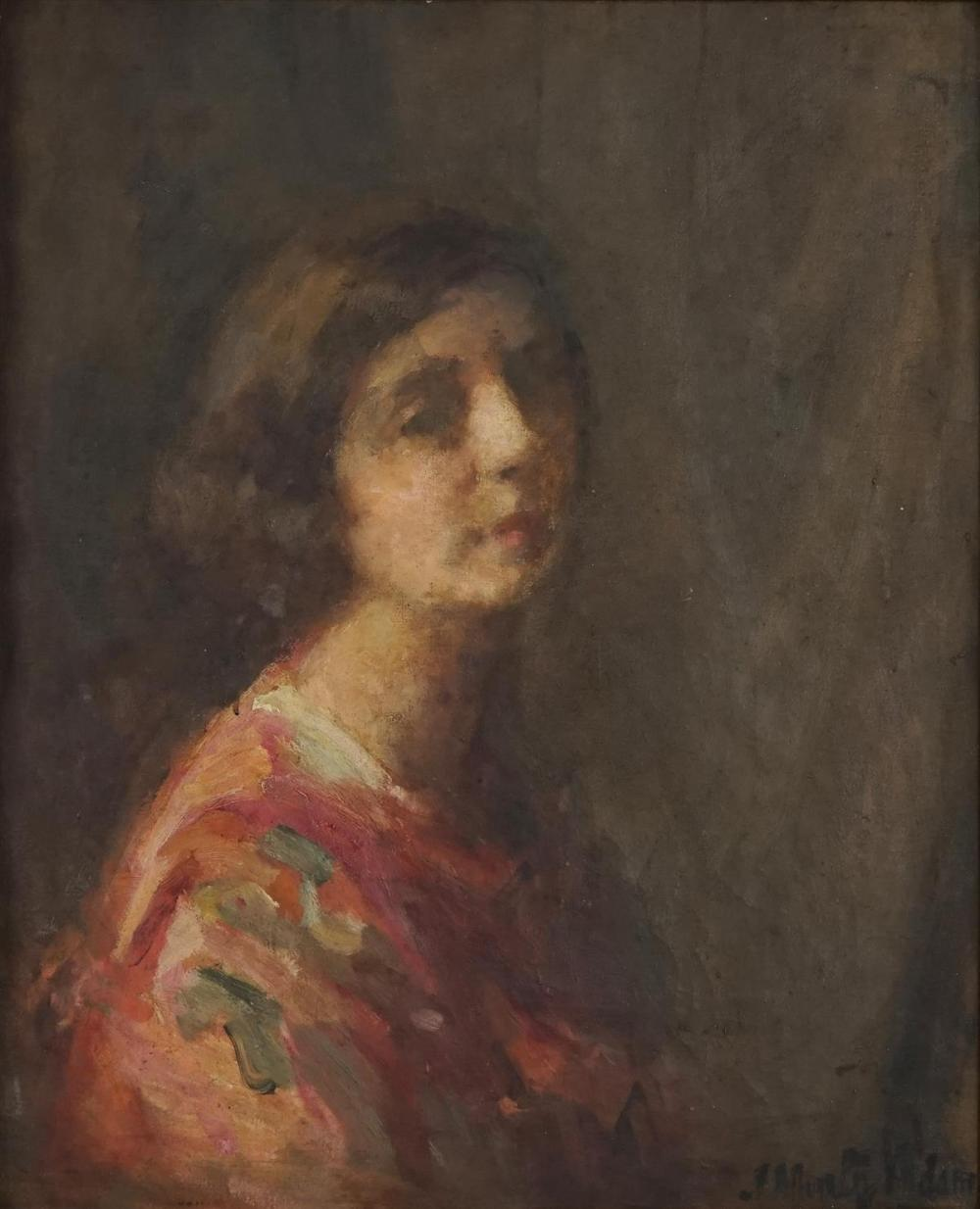
Portrait of a Lady, oil on canvas 56 x 47cm

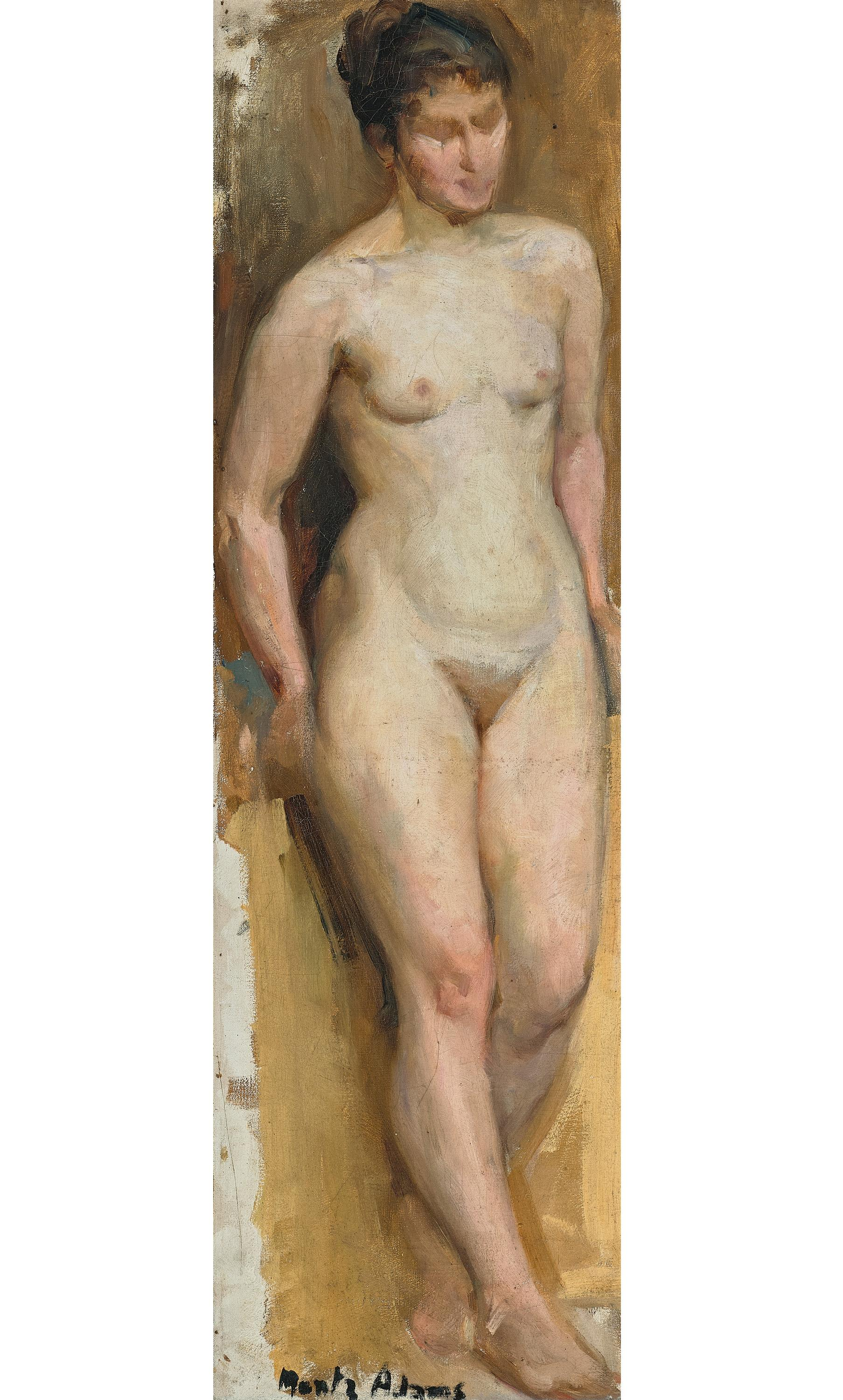
Standing Nude, oil on canvas on cardboard 76.5 x 23.0 cm
