= Australian Art Association =

Defunct Australian professional artists' organisation

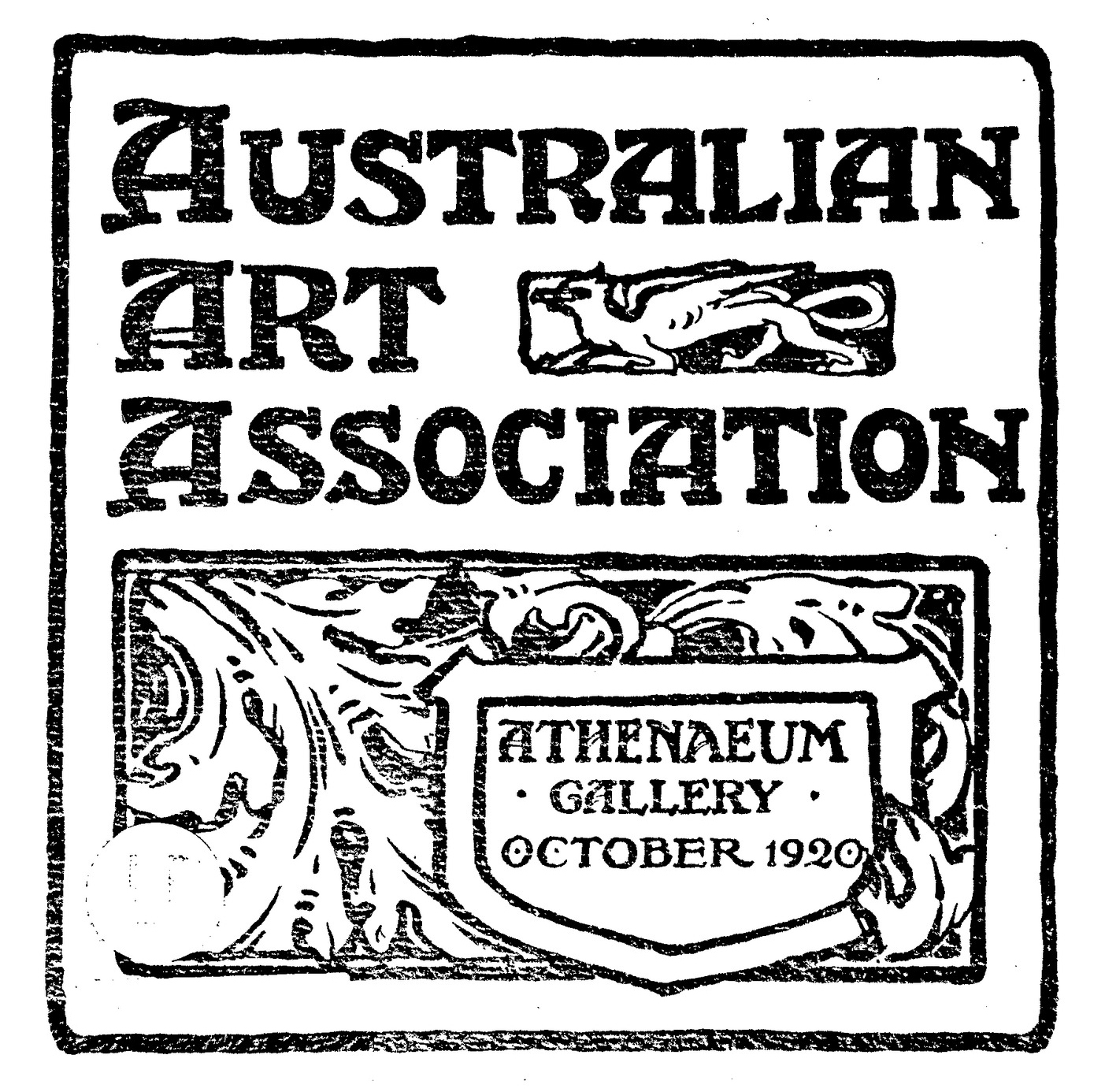
Australian Art Association, catalogue of exhibition, Athenaeum, Collins Street, Oct. 1920, image courtesy State Library of Victoria

The Australian Art Association, known as 'The Three A's' or 'AArtA', was a national body founded in Melbourne, in 1912 by Edward Officer (inaugural president) John Mather, Frederick McCubbin, Max Meldrum and Walter Withers.

== Other organisations ==
Other organisations have used the same name:

Bernard Smith notes that an earlier 'Australian Art Association' was formed when Tom Roberts, returning from overseas in 1885, found the Victorian Artists Society dominated by amateur artists. Leading a group of professional artists Arthur Streeton, Charles Conder, John Mather, Ford Paterson, W. B. Spong, Percival Ball, Artur Loureiro and Ugo Catani, he formed the a break-away academy, the first 'Australian Art Association'. In 1888 it rejoined and merged with the Victorian Artists Society.

Registered under the Companies Act at 395 Collins Street (the National Mutual Building) on 27 May 1901, the Association funded Tom Roberts' travel to England to complete portraits for his history painting The Opening of the First Parliament of the Commonwealth of Australia, and issued photogravure prints of it; artist's proofs sold for thirty guineas on parchment and fifteen guineas on Japanese paper, while prints on India paper cost three and a half guineas.

In 1974 the Art Association of Australia was founded to represent art historians, academics, critics, curators, artists, and art students. In 1999 tt incorporated New Zealand interests and to become the Art Association of Australia and New Zealand (AAANZ).

== Establishment of the 1912 Association ==
Not connected to the first or second so named, another, which is the subject of this article, was established eleven years later as a national organisation exclusively for Australian professional artists (Tom Roberts was to show with them in the 1920s). McGrath, and Williams, note that it too was a break-away group from the Victorian Artists Society in reaction to its acceptance of amateurs as members. As The Argus newspaper article announcing it explains in 1912:

For some time past an endeavour has been on foot amongst the artists of the community to form a society which could fitly represent the highest attainments of the professional painters of Melbourne. The present Victorian Artists Society, it is claimed, fails to do this, as the professional element is a small minority amongst several hundred members, and the principle of one man one vote, it is said, renders them powerless to control the affairs of the society.

Proceedings culminated in a meeting held on Friday night in the Cafe Francais, attended by Messrs Mather, McCubbin, Withers, Innes, McClintock, Patterson, Meldrum and Officer. Amongst other resolutions it was decided unanimously to hold a first exhibition in May next, for which the Athenaeum is already secured. These names should guarantee the quality of the new body. Almost all have pictures in one or more of the National Galleries of Melbourne, Sydney and Adelaide, and two are trustees of the Felton Bequest.

The name chosen for the new organisation is "The Australian Art Association". They will incur no expenses beyond those of exhibition, and thereby avoid the necessity for the large membership roll with they claim hampers the Victorian Artists' Society.

== Members and office holders ==
Members included Norman Macgeorge (second president), Rupert Bunny, James Ranalph Jackson, Leslie Wilkie, and William Dunn Knox whose first exhibition was in 1918 with the Association in Melbourne before he was elected to it in 1919 and later served as its Treasurer in 1924 with Edith Lucy Antoinette Hobbs (wife of George Bell

Other council members included Louis McCubbin, elected as President in 1912, Norman Macgeorge, Alexander Colquhoun, Napier Waller, Charles Wheeler, Harry (Henry Broomilow) Harrison, and Charles Web Gilbert, under President W. B. McInnes, with Leslie Wilkie secretary. Edward Officer was Secretary in 1914, when Clara Southern became the first woman to join the Association and the first to serve on its committee. George Bell joined the committee in 1922.

== Ethos ==
The Argus, after the Association had recently formed with members expressing "complete sympathy with the Federal art movement", reported that its aim was to reject "conventional, precise, and mechanical reproductions of nature" in preference for "a personal message, musical quality of line and colour." The writer was likely to have been the cartoonist and Max Meldrum disciple, Henry Bromilow Harrison who was freelance critic for that Melbourne paper for the lifetime of the Association.

In 1920, Edward Officer, President of the Association, in a letter to The Argus, represented its opposition to the import duty then being imposed on imported art, remarking that "This year it happens that many of the Australian artists who have made names for themselves in England and Europe will come to us with exhibitions of their work, and will be, as Mr [Arthur] Streeton was, confronted with this ridiculous duty." Their deputation in June to the Customs Minister discovered that he conceded, and that works of Australian artists and art students residing less than five years abroad would be free of import duty.

== Exhibitions ==
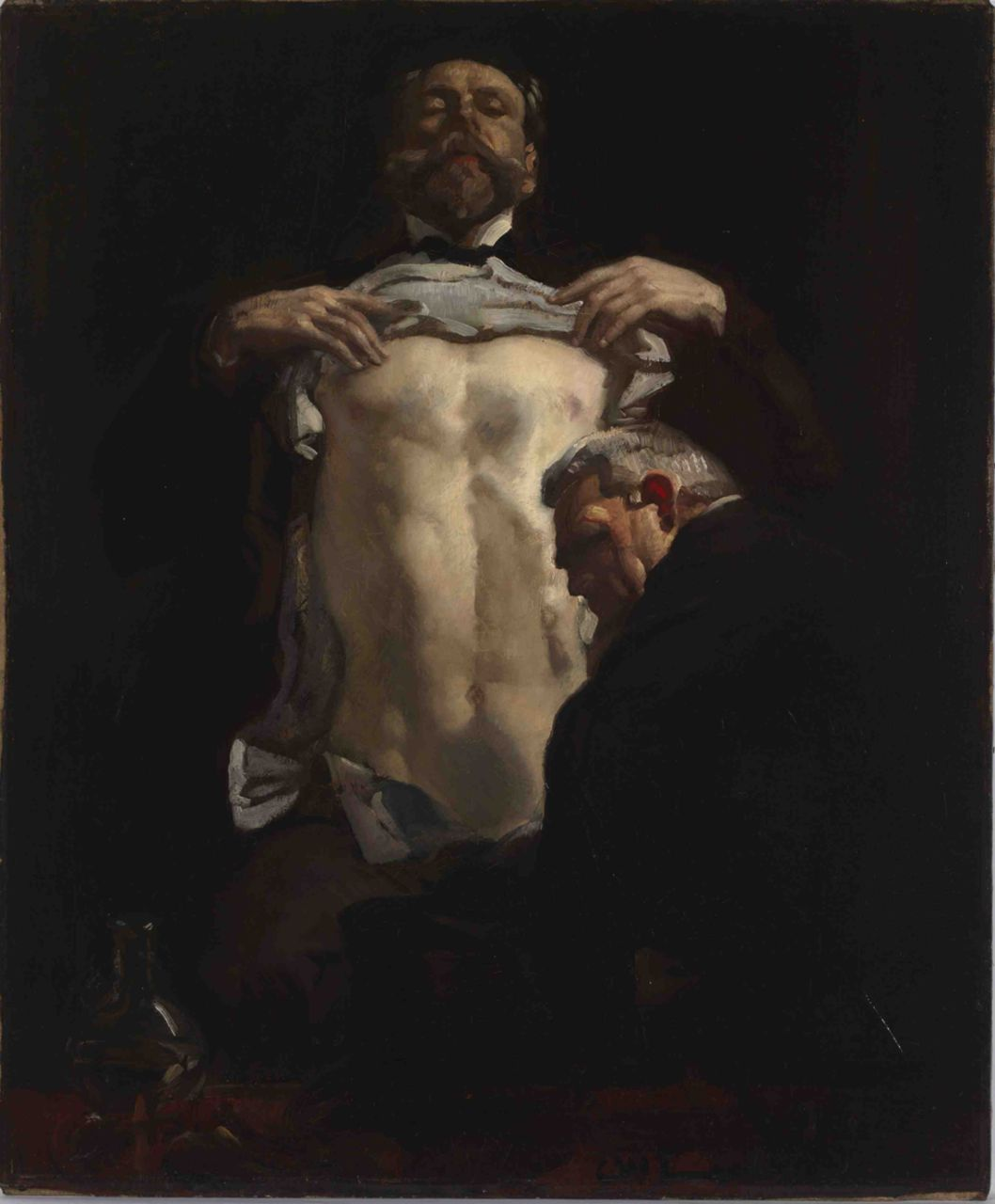
George W Lambert (1910) Chesham Street, shown in the 1913 exhibition. National Gallery of Australia

Starting in May 1913, the Association held annual exhibitions of its members' work, usually in the Athenaeum gallery,

=== 1913 ===
The first, opened by Lady Denman, included works by Clewin Harcourt, Norman Macgeorge, Frederick McCubbin, Charles Webb Gilbert, John Shirlow, W. Lister Lister, Norman Carter, Howard Ashton, Hans Heysen, John Mather (artist), Ambrose Patterson, George Washington Lambert, Janet Cumbrae Stewart, Walter Withers, and Josephine Muntz Adams and those exhibiting with the AArtA on other occasions included these significant women artists:

- Alice Marian Ellen Bale
- Janet Cumbrae Stewart (May 1913, 1916, 1917)
- Nora Gurdon
- Constance Macky Jenkins (October 1919)
- Marion Jones (October 1919)
- Vida Lahey (September 1922)
- Dora Ohlfsen
- Margaret Preston
- Thea Proctor (September 1922)
- Florence Rodway (September 1917)
- Clara Southern (June 1914, September 1917)
- Ruth Sutherland (June 1914, September 1917)
- Jo Sweatman (October 1916, September 1917, September 1922)
- Dora Wilson (October 1919, September 1922)

=== 1914 ===
The second exhibition, described (again probably by Henry B. Harrison) as "a sincere and very earnest endeavour to grapple with the problem of raising Australian painting from the despondency into which it has fallen," and more "widely representative of the best Art of Australia", was opened by Lady Helen Munro Ferguson in June 1914. She remarked that in leaving Australia, artists acquire the styles and character of other countries, but that the exhibitors, "who had stayed behind", appeared to her to be "purely Australian in character," and "should be regarded as benefactors." Joining with the founding group were Arthur Streeton, Penleigh Boyd, Percy Leason, Rupert Bunny, Harold Herbert, Herbert McClintock, George Coates, James Quinn, Clara Southern, David Davies, Ruth Sutherland, the American F. C. Frieske, Walter Withers, who died following a stroke that year, and E. Phillips Fox, who died in the following year.

=== 1915 ===
An 'art union' sale of work by one guinea subscriptions was held at the Athenaeum on 23 March 1915 to raise 500 guineas for the support of the Red Cross, with expenses borne by the AArtA, was fully subscribed, with a cheque for £665/12/00 (2025 value: A$84,380.00) presented to Lady Ferguson. Hans Heysen was one who contributed a painting, however, such was the intensity of anti-German sentiment that the National Gallery declined his work and he felt obliged to quit the Association due to similar attitudes he encountered there, declaring that “if a man’s feeling for Australia cannot be judged by the work he has done then no explanation on his part would dispel the mistrust ."

The annual exhibition was held that year on 7 October, opened by the Governor Sir Arthur Stanley, who remarked that the association should offer no apology exhibiting in war time because it was essential to keep art alive in such times of turmoil; "in fact, they should especially exert themselves at such a period. When the mind of the world was diverted towards destruction it was well that there were people who continued to devote themselves to a creative work." Twenty percent of profits—£19/12/8 (2025 value: A$2,484.00)—was reserved to fund the Red Cross. Later that year the AArtA joined the Women's Art Club, the Arts and Crafts Society, and the National Gallery School students in a 17 December 'Remembrance Day' effort to sell works to provide a special ambulance for use in the war.

=== 1916 ===
The fourth AArtA annual exhibition, again at the Athenaeum and opened by the Governor and his A.D.C. the screenwriter Capt. Conant, was held in October 1916, in which was "the most beautiful portrait study she has ever accomplished" by Janet Cumbrae Stewart, with her Red Cross Worker, and "vibrating light" in Leslie Wilkie's study of an interior, were praised in an upbeat Argus review written by another journalist, since HB Harrison, the usual commentator, was showing works, "realising...textures, and play of light." In America, The Christian Science Monitor published a report on the show by a Melbourne-based 'special correspondent' in its December issue.

=== 1917 ===
On 12 September 1917 the fifth AArtA exhibition, opened again by Governor Stanley at the Athenaeum, included works by Clara Southern, James Jackson, Florence Rodway, Janet Cumbrae Stewart, Leslie Wilkie, H. B. Harrison, Edward Officer, Frederick McCubbin, Clewin Harcourt, Norman Carter, Alexander Colquhoun, Jo Sweatman (whose first solo show, of 150 works opened next at the Athenaeum), Herbert McClintock, Ruth Sutherland, John Shirlow, Louis McCubbin, Albert E. Newbury, and Norman MacGeorge. On 17 September The Australasian published reproductions of selections from the show.

=== 1918 ===
In the last months of WWI, funds from the sixth exhibition, held in June 1918, were donated to the Red Cross. Penleigh Boyd, A. E. Newbury, Leslie Wilkie, Clewin Harcourt, Norman McGeorge, Edward Officer, W. Beckwith McInnes, William Dunn Knox, L. Bernard Hall, Frederick George Reynolds, Ruth Sutherland, Jo Sweatman, Marion Jones, Dora Wilson, Clara Southern, Janet Cumbrae Stewart, Alexander C. McClintock, Harold Herbert, J. R .Jackson, William Frater, Alexander Colquhoun, W. Nicholls Anderson, Charles Wheeler, and (the late) Frederick McCubbin exhibited.

=== 1919 ===
The Art Association's annual exhibition in October 1919 was preceded in August-September by that of its rival organisation, the Victorian Artists Society. Penleigh Boyd, W. B. McInnes, Edward Officer, Norman McGeorge, William Dunn Knox, R. H. Harrison, Edwin Harcourt, Leslie Wilkie, Bernard Hall, Jo Sweatman, Ruth Sutherland, J. McNally, Harold Herbert, Dora Wilson, Janet Cumbrae Stewart, Will Ashton, Florence Rodway, Norman Carter, and Constance Jenkins were among the exhibitors. During the exhibition, the members dined at J. Richardson's 'Café Francais' at 257 Little Collins St. to honour their President, Edward Officer and to toast soldier artists.

=== 1920 ===
Opening on 1 October 1920, The Argus made special mention of works by work by Arthur Streeton, Penleigh Boyd, Louis McCubbin, Edward Officer, Alexander Colquhoun, Norman Macgeorge, William Dunn Knox, Clewin Harcourt, James Jackson, Charles Wheeler, Bernard Hall, Leslie Wilkie, W. H. Mcinnes, H. B. Harrison, Jo Sweatman, Will Ashton, Janet Cumbrae Stewart, Dora Wilson, Harold Herbert, Alexander C. McClintock C. Webb Gilbert, and newcomers Napier Waller, James Ranalph Jackson, Frank R. Crozier, David Alison, George Clausen, Christian Hampel, and George Bell.

=== 1921 ===
After the death that year of President, Edward Officer, and his replacement by Norman Macgeorge on a unanimous vote, a new venue, the Fine Art Society's Gallery, 100 Exhibition Street, Melbourne, was chosen for the Association's annual exhibition opening 15 September 1921, and was hailed in the press as "one of the strongest yet held by that body, the work throughout being of a uniformly high standard." Those showing included H. B Mcinnes, Clewin Harcourt, George Coates, Leslie Wllkie, Charles Wheeler, George Bell, Bernard Hall, Alexander Colquhoun, Harry B Harrison, George Washington Lambert, Harold Septimus Power, Arthur Streeton, Louis McCubbin, Penleigh Boyd, W. B. McInnes, Norman Macgeorge, William Dunn Knox, Harold Herbert, John Eldershaw, Matthew MacNally, Napier Waller, Janet Cumbrae Stewart, Dora Wilson, and sculptor C Web Gilbert. The Governor, with his A.D.C. Capt. Keppel-Palmer and the Countess of Stradbroke attended on 20 September. Purchases of several works, including one by W. D. Knox were made by Lord Northcliffe during the world tour that preceded his death the following year.

=== 1922 ===
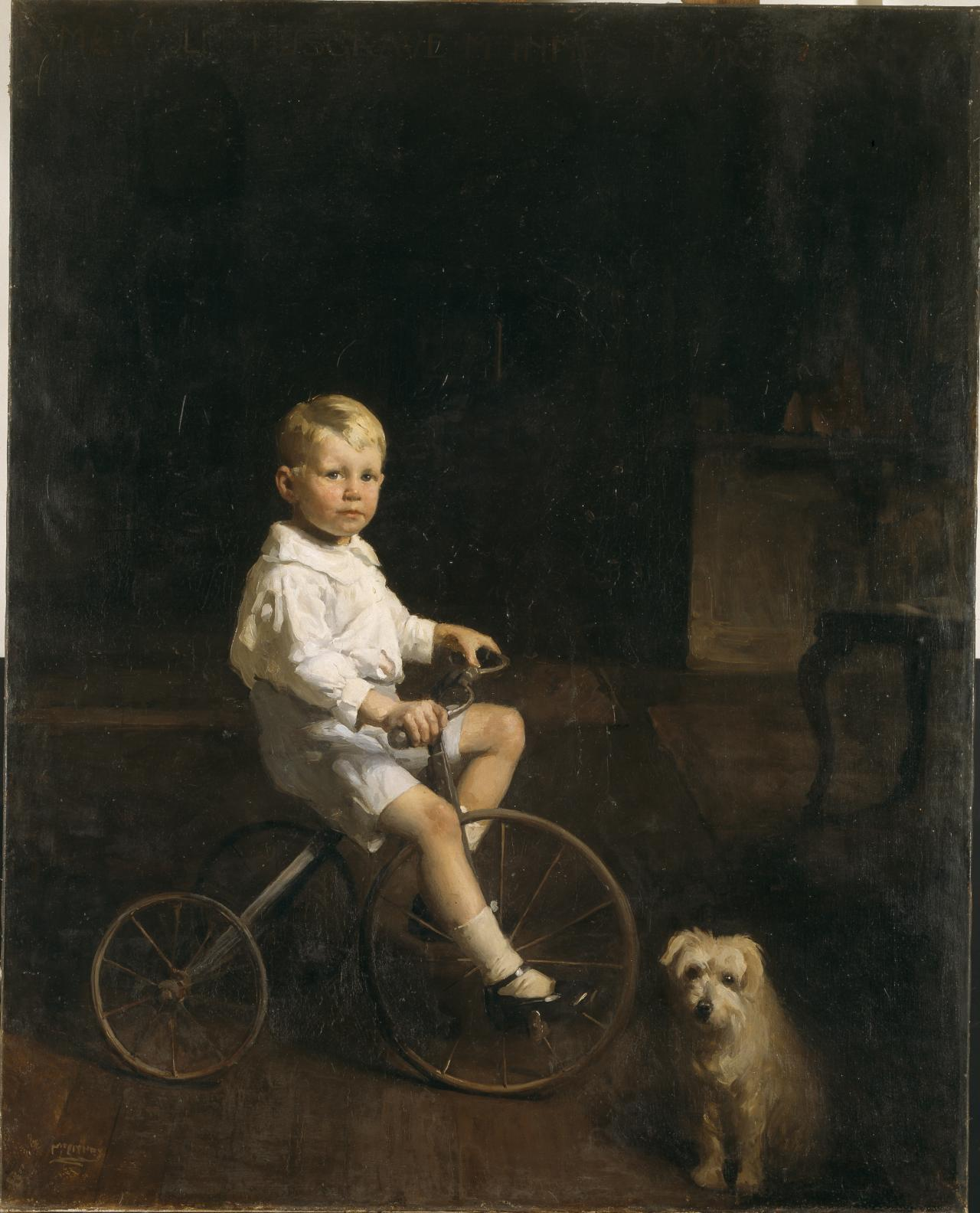
W. B. McInnes (1922) Malcolm and Gyp. Oil on canvas 153.4 × 122.8 cm. National Gallery of Victoria, Melbourne. Felton Bequest, 1922

Treasurer Alexander McClintock had died early in 1922, the year a Camille Corot painting previously unseen in Melbourne was an attraction in the July annual exhibition, the tenth, held again at the Fine Art Society's Gallery and opened by Theodore Fink. Though the Corot failed to appear due to the owner's discomfort over its safety, Augustus John's unfinished but "vivid and Real" portrait of the Prime Minister Billy Hughes was loaned by R. D. Elliott.

An 'at home' was held at the gallery, catered by the wives of Norman Macgeorge, W.H. McInnes, Leslie Wilkie, Bernard Hall, and George Bell, with Dora Wilson. Sydney Ure Smith, editor of Art in Australia traveled from New South Wales to attend the exhibition.

Artists from New South Wales, Tasmania, and Queensland were exhibitors, including John Longstaff, who showed a full length portrait of Dame Nellie Melba. Other interstate artists included George Lambert, Septimus Power, Will Ashton, J Jackson, Elioth Gruner, Collins, Thea Proctor, Vida Lahey, J R. Eldershaw. Canvases by Britons Sir William Orpen and Augustus John invited further interest. Among Victorians exhibiting were W. B. McInnes, Norman Macgeorge, Alexander Colquhoun, Leslie Wilkie, A. E. Newbury. Webb Gilbert, W. D. Knox, George Bell, Penleigh Boyd, H. B. Harrison, Louis McCubbin, Napier Waller, Charles Wheeler, Jo Sweatman, and others.

Alexander Colquhoun, writing in The Herald remarked that the exhibition was "not quite up to the standard of last year, which probably marks the highwater level of the association's endeavours," which drew an offended letter to the editor from Norman Macgeorge. The Australasian critic concurred. However Colquhoun and all other commentators were impressed by the portraits, especially W. B. McInnes' portrait of his son, Malcolm and Gyp. The work was purchased from the exhibition by the National Gallery of Victoria through the Felton Bequest.

=== 1923 ===
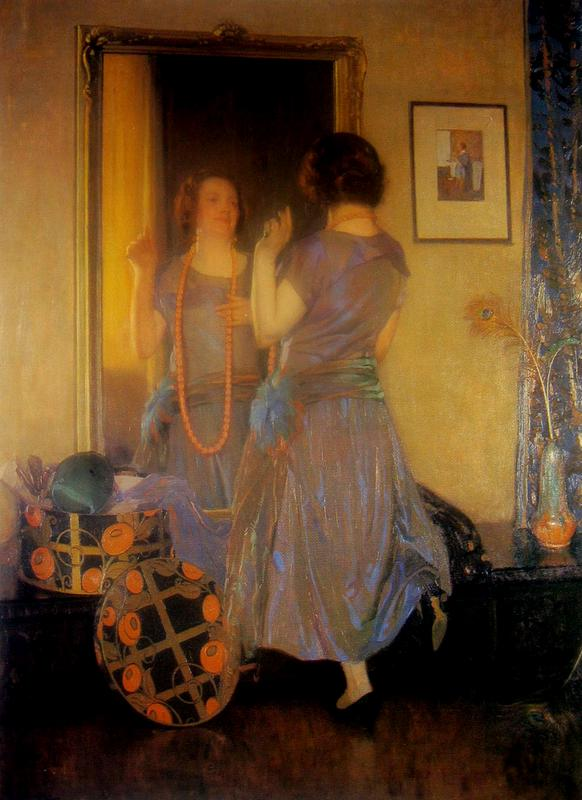
Charles Wheeler (1923) The Amber Necklace. Oil on canvas 167 x 120 cm. Exhibited: 1923 annual AArtA exhibition

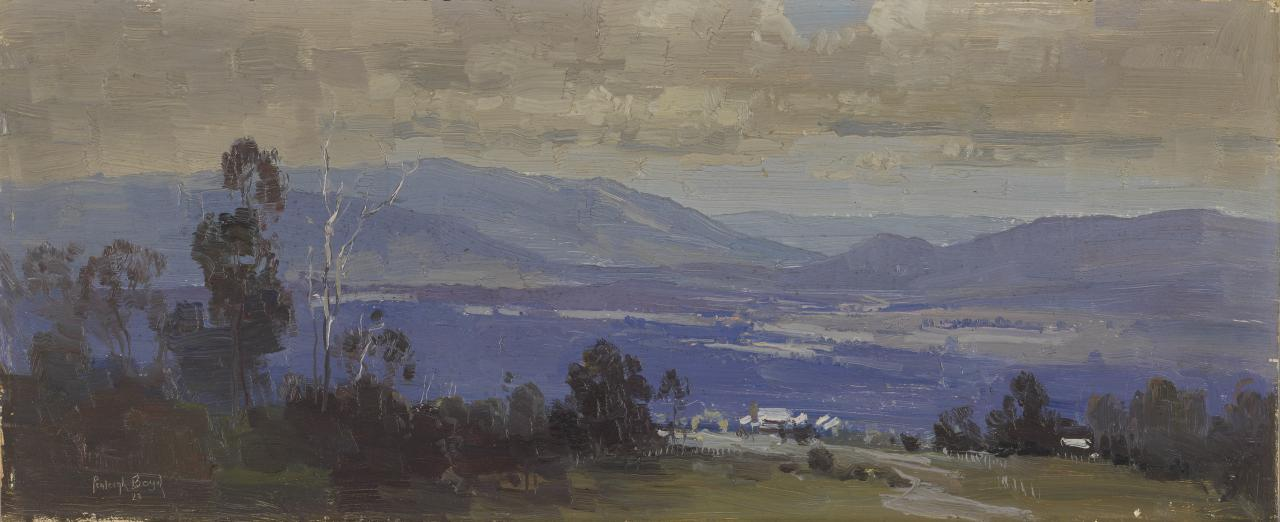
Penleigh Boyd (1923) The Warburton Ranges. Oil on cardboard, 22.8 × 55.5 cm. Purchased by Governor-General from 1923 annual AArtA exhibition. National Gallery of Victoria

Discussions were had in February at Melbourne's Cafe Francais, led by frequent exhibitor with the AArtA, Norman Carter, who had traveled from Sydney, about the London exhibition, planned for two and a half years, of Australian art at the Royal Academy, for which the Association assured him support, entailing £2,000 from them and Sydney's Society of Artists for rental of four rooms in Burlington House in which to show around 250 paintings including loans from the state galleries. Lord Rothemere, Dame Nellie Melba, and state governors promised their patronage. It was discovered that the terms of the Felton Bequest would limit the selection of works to be sent, as artworks acquired through it could not leave the country.

In March at the Cafe Francais W. B. Mcinnes was elected President of the Association, with Leslie Wilkie appointed as hon. secretary, W. D. Knox, hon secretary while all members of the council were re-elected. Gratitude was expressed to Norman McGeorge, the retiring president. In May, the colleagues toasted Clewin Harcourt before his departure for Europe.

It was announced that members Rupert Bunny, George Coates, James Quinn, Dora Meeson, Violet Teague, Marion Jones, and Cumbrae Stewart were exhibiting in the Paris Salon. George Bell, W. Beckwiith Mclnness, Hans Heysen and H. Desbrowe Annear had traveled to Sydney to select works for the London exhibition. They joined Sydney judges S. Ure Smith, Norman Lindsay, Howard Ashton, and John Longstaff.

The annual exhibition that year returned to the Athenaeum and opened on 13 November, in which Table Talk hailed "the revival of figure work". Exhibitors included L. Bernard Hall, H. S. Power, W.B. McInnes, Blamire Young, H. B. Harrison, W.D. Knox, George Bell, Charles Wheeler, Tom Roberts, L. Wilkie, S. Ure Smith, Penleigh Boyd, John Eldershaw, Harold Herbert, Harry Harrison, Dora Wilson, Napier Waller, Jo Sweatman, A. E. Newbury, Daryl Lindsay, A.M.E. Bale, Frank Crozier, A Colquhoun, Will Ashton, and J.D. Moore, Margaret Preston and Thea Proctor. The Age lauded the show as "undoubtedly the best art offering that has been made in Melbourne. It comprises the work of leading artists in Australia..." and only the watercolour landscapes were "not up to standard." Governor-General Lord Forster attended the exhibition on 14 November 1923, and purchased Penleigh Boyd's Warburton Ranges, now in the collection of the National Gallery of Victoria. Boyd died in a car accident only a fortnight later, 28 November, at Warragul. Pall-bearers at his funeral and burial at Brighton cemetery on 31 November were Association members W.B. McInnes, Norman MacGeorge, L. Bernard Hall, Harold Herbert, C. Web-Gilbert, Frank Crozier, Napier Waller, James S. MacDonald, Alexander Colquhoun, John Longstaff, John Shirlow and M. J. MacNally.

=== 1924 ===
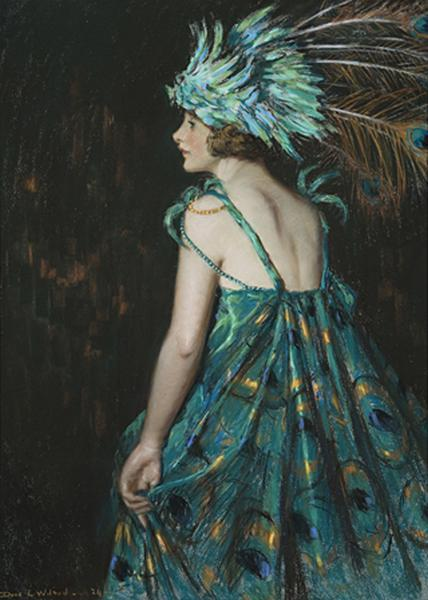
Dora Wilson (1924) Entr'acte. Pastel on paper on card 73 x 53 cm, exhibited at the 1924 AArtA exhibition

In January Sydney Association member Will Ashton left for Europe. Interviewed in The News of his home state, he said he intended seeing new art "Otherwise one is likely to get into a groove. By keeping in touch with the latest trend of artistic thought that danger is eliminated".

Meeting in Charles Wheeler's studio in June, Wheeler (president), Wilkie (secretary) Knox (treasurer) were re-elected to those positions, and G. Bell, L. McCubbin, N. McGeorge, A. Colquhoun, Napier Waller, C. Wheeler, H. B. Harrison, and C. Web Gilbert were elected to the council.

At a dinner at the Cafe Francais, architect Rodney Alsop and Sydney Ure Smith, editor of Art in Australia attended. Smith praised NGV director Bernard Hall’s role in fostering Victorian art, but criticised the Felton Bequest for its acquisitions, usually old masters of interest only to connoisseurs and more suited to a museum, and insufficient purchase of contemporary Australian works, compared to the Sydney Gallery’s support of local art. He considered a Federal society not possible, given opinions of what constituted worthy art varied so amongst the various States.

12 November marked the opening of the annual exhibition with a private viewing at 2:30pm, again at the Athenaeum, with The Argus summarily commenting that "It is a little more than 12 years since a number of the leading artists of Victoria banded together to hold exhibitions annually of work produced in this State, combined with contributions from the best painters in other parts of Australia. The exhibition has been always Federal in character" and "the aims of the society have been always from the ideal point of view and the uplifting of the artistic standard." Exhibitors included George Bell, L. Bernard Hall, W. B. Mcinnes. H. B. Harrison, Norman Macgeorge, Leslie Wilkie, A. Colquhoun, M. Napier Waller, Harold Herbert, A.E. Newbury, W. D. Knox, Louis McCubbin, Charles Wheeler, Sydney Ure Smith, John D. Moore, Fred Leist, James Quinn, and Rupert Bunny.

Of the latter, Alexander Colquhoun of The Age condemned works:

from Australian artists abroad. Messrs. Leist, Quinn and Bunny [which are] lamentable...Leist is as hard as unsympathetic as a paving stone. Quinn is merely impertinent, with a ton of affectation, in his two portrait studies, while Bunny, who has done some really great work in times gone by, shows signs of decaying mentality in two hideous panels, devoid of charm, draftsmanship or color. With the exception of the lastmentioned offerings, the exhibition is remarkable for its honesty. There is no attempt to distribute any of that so-called "truth in art" propaganda.

Colquhoun's article praised McInnes' portrait Miss Neville Collins which that year won the Archibald Prize, and singled out Napier Waller's The Amazons—which was purchased from the exhibition for the collection of the NGV through the Felton Bequest—"Waller has a vivid and romantic soul. One has never seen such glorious rhythm as in...The Amazons, or such masterly grouping of figures and such delicate, reticent color. It is a masterpiece, in fact the whole of the offerings of this brilliant genius are." Member J. S. McDonald wrote his Herald review that as a mark of its quality that "there are a large number of good portraits and figure work, and plenty of evidence of high ability."

With its usual flippancy The Bulletin remarked on "a lady covered (in places) by a green dress, and obviously embarrassed by her shoulder-straps, has engaged the attention of Dora Wilson in “Entr’acte’". Better than usual sales during the exhibition encouraged the plan to mount a show of smaller works in addition to the annual event.

=== 1925 ===
The year opened with The Age, whose critic at the time was frequent AArtA co-exhibitor Alexander Colquhoun, issuing the Association a challenge based on a 'campaign' being conducted by The National Art Association of New Zealand in issuing a 'circular' in which it broadly proclaimed that "Art in its widest meaning is the expression of life, the individual's expression of his ideas of use and beauty beauty in different ways, in different materials.'. The Age article concludes: "the Australian Art Association is now given a friendly lead to get up and do something instead of sitting back in splendid Turneresque isolation and degenerating into a mutual admiration society. As at present constituted, to use an Americanism, 'from the chin up it is dead.' An exhibition once a year, when the members meet like long-lost brothers, is not any use. There must be some concerted effort to help both public and artists. The Victorian Artists Society is making a valiant effort, but this is not enough. It is up to the Australian Art Association to throw off this stupid suburban lethargy and also the sinister influence of a coterie of alleged connoisseurs, studio lizards and artistic poseurs, and make an effort to better the enterprise of these vimful New Zealanders..."

The energy and commitment George Bell, President in 1925, and his earning of accolades and memberships of worthy international art institutions, was praised in a June Age article acknowledging that with "his teaching, his solid work as president of the Australian Art Association and his many commissions, Mr. Bell spends a strenuous time." Mary Allen was elected 'associate member' of the Association.

The annual exhibition was to be launched on 27 August at the Athenaeum, by Speaker of the House of Representatives the conservatives' William Watt (not, as was reported elsewhere, Solicitor-General Sir Robert Garran). Chief Secretary Stanley Argyle filled the role and after his speech broadcast on radio the day before, mentioned that several of the paintings exhibited "had been painted by artists whose works were known and highly appreciated in' other parts of the world: member exhibitors Arthur Streeton, George Bell, W. B. McInnes, Charles Wheeler, Leslie Wilkie, Louis McCubbin, Norman Macgeorge, Harold Herbert. W. D. Knox, H. B. Harrison, M. J. MacNally. Charles Wheeler entered a portrait of Herald critic 'Jimmy' MacDonald which had won the 1924 Archibald. The show on this occasion was without paintings by Bernard Hall, John Longstaff, Max Meldrum, and "not so outstanding in the number of large and ambitious exhibits as the last memorable show according to The Sun. Sydney painters included were Norman Carter, B.E. Minns, Charles Bryant, J. D. Moore, Thea Proctor, Margaret Preston; with John Eldershaw of Tasmania; Hans Heysen from South Australia; and Vida Lahey of Brisbane. S. Ure Smith, who was a guest at the Association's dinner at the Cafe Francais on 24 August, also exhibited. He brought a proposal by his Sydney Society to send pictures to the imminent New Zealand exhibition, and to accept pictures by Victorian artists in the consignment.

The Herald critic James Stuart MacDonald (an Association member himself) admired George Bell's A Lady in Black (now held but the Art Gallery of New South Wales), but singled out, in has absence abroad, W. B. McInnes's Tom Luxton as "well painted" despite its "forced studio lighting", Mary Allen's The Yellow Jacket as "closely observed" but "needing development", found the subject of Leslie Wilkie's Bonnie Jean "A sweet little girl in which every bit of girlish sweetness is conveyed", but considered that Norman Carter's Portrait in Black lacked "substance", Jo Sweatman's and A.M.E. Bale's portraits "too dumpy". Colquhoun in The Age found "too much of a tendency...to stick to the conventional landscape and the orthodox portrait study...particularly noticeable in the Melbourne efforts" while finding Sydney artist Margaret Preston striking "a new note". Nevertheless, he wrote that George Bell's portrait of his wife "pulsates with humanity, and is posed delightfully." He was in agreement with McDonald in saying that Allen's The Yellow Jacket was "not carried far enough," but by contrast considered Vida Lahey's still life "the most delightful flower study imaginable." Later, The Herald reported on the success of the exhibition with "sales [that] have exceeded those of any former year, and that with less than a third of the duration of the exhibition having passed."

Dining with the committee at the Ritz Cafe, Lonsdale Street, toward the end of the exhibition the opening speaker Argyle addressed complaints voiced by the Association about the selection process for acquisitions at the National Gallery of Victoria, commenting that the institution was gallery, museum and library, but necessarily with only one set of trustees to manage all. To applause he posed the question: Did you not think that it is the function of Victorian artists to educate the people so that there will be a demand for a new national gallery devoted entirely to Australian art?" Collector Dr Samuel Arthur Ewing, also present, agreed, acknowledging that there might be a better method of selection of artworks. Alexander Leeper, Chairman of the Felton Bequest in a letter to The Argus doubted that artists, if they joined in the selection process, would be able to be independent and to avoid "professional jealousies". He explained that Bernard Hall, a member of the Association, was consulted by the trustees, but that the committee was appointed by, and operated under, the rules of Felton's will. Even if artists set up a separate gallery devoted to Australian art, they would receive no support from the bequest, which in fact set aside a percentage of funds for purchase of local art.

In October, the Association held another dinner, also at the Ritz Cafe, for Will Ashton, one of a series through which "painters of interstate fame (and their aims) [would be made] better known to each other." Soon after, on 3 October, member Charles Webb Gibert died, coincidental with the arrival of his bronze group Matthew Flinders, cast in England. Members of the Association served as pallbearers at his burial at Coburg Cemetery.

At another dinner occasion S. Ure Smith arrived to present a bronze medial to John Connell (in his unavoidable absence) for services rendered to art.

=== 1926 ===
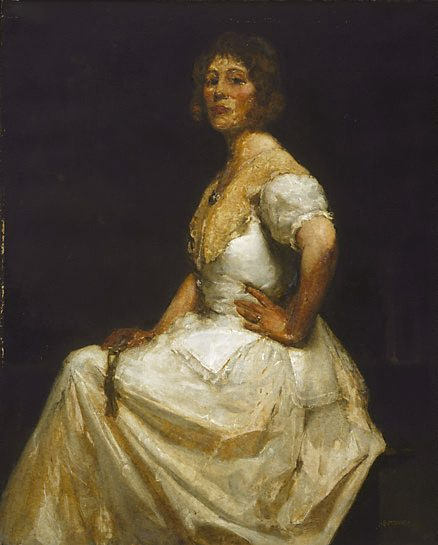
William Beckwith McInnes (1926) Silk and Lace, oil on canvas 113.4 x 92.0 cm AGNSW, purchased 1927

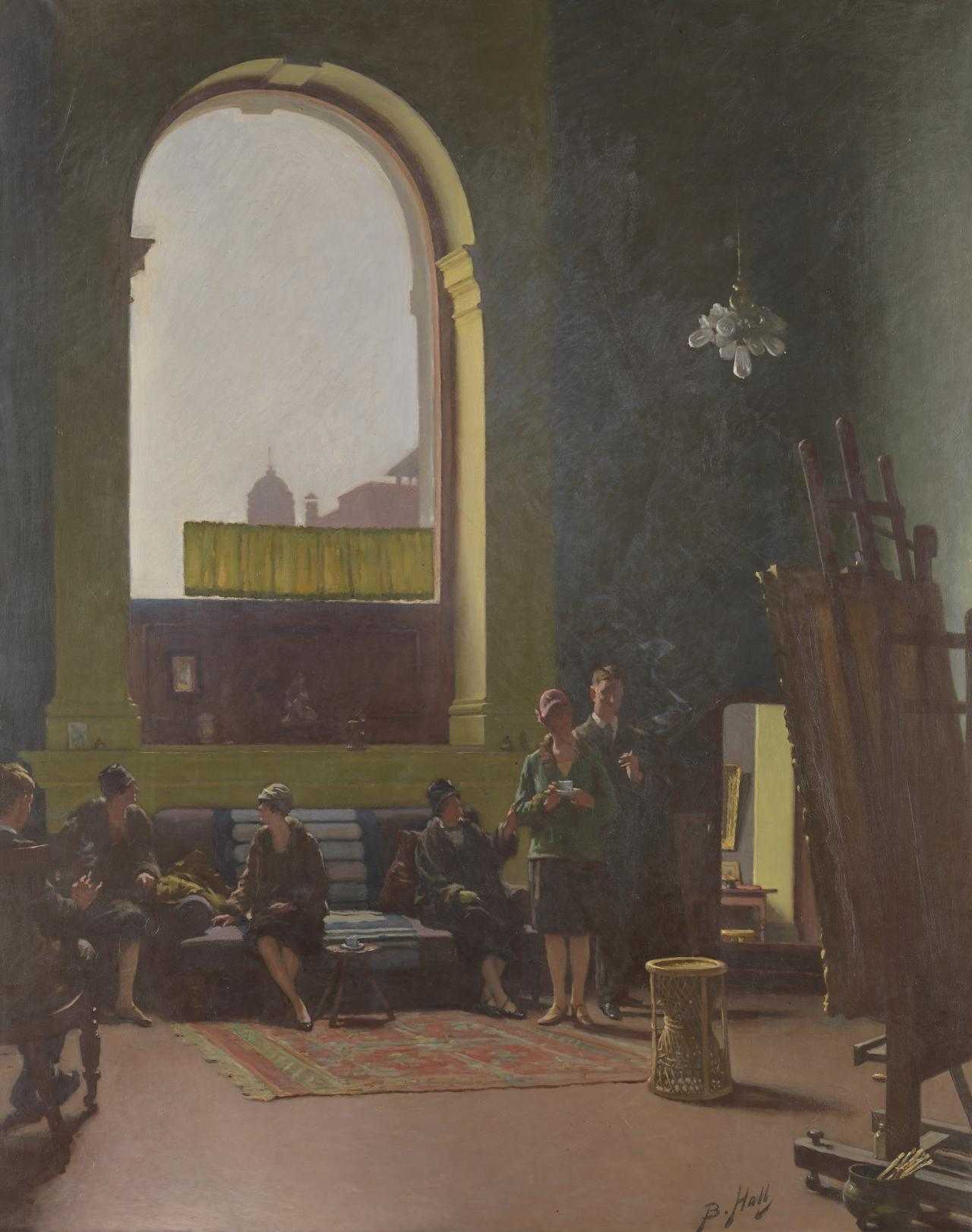
Bernard Hall (1926) The Studio Party

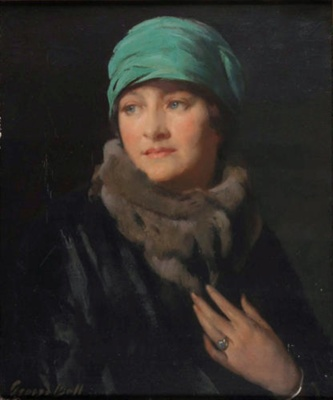
George Bell (1926) The Green Turban, oil on canvas, 61.3h x 51.1w cm. New England Regional Art Museum

The year started with the departure for England of Tasmanian member and watercolourist John Eldershaw. The committee met in July in the newly constructed Temple Court building, at 422 Collins Street to discuss the proposed Anzac memorial. Members agreed that there should be a square facing Parliament House but argued that a cenotaph was insufficient and instead called for a sculpted memorial "something very big and beautiful" at Parliament House, to be constructed separate from the proposed Anzac Square. Arthur Streeton, regarding the proposed memorial on St Kilda Road, argued that it was too like a shrine to be popularly appealing, that "something more triumphal was needed". Chief Secretary Argyle responding to their objections, asked the artists to reconsider once they saw the detail of the plans on land proposed to be acquired at the corner of Bourke and Exhibition Streets. He agreed that statuary would be a desirable addition to the cenotaph.

In August, Association member Leslie Wilkie was invited to apply for the curatorship at the South Australian art gallery, interviewed, and appointed on 1 September, then farewelled at the Ritz Cafe before his departure for Adelaide on the 29th. The annual exhibition was announced, to be held at the Athenaeum from 11 November, with the opening officiated by the Governor Lord Somers, a self confessed art lover and amateur critic, who in the event congratulated the original committee on their success in founding the Association.

John Longstaff was elected president. Council members elected were retiring president George Bell, Charles Wheeler, Harold Herbert, Louis McCubbin, Arthur Streeton, H. B. McInnes, A Colquhoun, W. D. Knox as treasurer and C. M. Hosking, secretary. New members admitted were Will Dyson, John Rowell and George C Benson

AArtA member James S. MacDonald in The Herald declared that the "Australian Art Association's exhibition gets better every year...the excellence of the show depends on sound orthodox works," which he followed with a discourse on portraiture; that it must be faithful to likeness, but should preserve individual vision. Commissioned portraits stifle originality, he writes, and produce bland, short-lived work, while true mastery lies in independence and courage of conviction; portraits that depart thoughtfully from stereotype are more valuable and enduring. Affirming the orthodox standards of fidelity to likeness, he rejects anything “dislocating” or radical. While he allows limited “imaginative flights,” they are framed as personal independence within tradition, not formal or conceptual innovation, preserving academic naturalism and individualist expression against modernist experimentation.

Recently appointed Association member Mary Allen, writing in The Sun agreed the show was its 'finest ever', and identified as outstanding four portraits by H. B. McInnes including that of Esther Patterson in Silk and Lace. The National Gallery of Victoria, in offering less for the picture than the 500 guineas private buyers had offered, had forced McInnes' decision to withdraw it from sale, over which he expressed no regret as it was "the one I should most grieve to see going out of my hands." His subject responded that "it is so lovely, purely from an artist's point of view, so glowing and unaffected and alive in its treatment and painting, that I would be sad if I could never see it again. I love to look at it, and it is seldom, I think, that a woman can feel like that about a picture of herself, even if it really flatters her."

The Studio Party by Bernard Hall, showing a group in his studio in the National Gallery Art School, Allen considered "a still more successful variant of a theme he has already painted; the effect of distance and atmosphere given by looking against the light in a great room is admirably conveyed, and the small figures are placed with great judgment and charm." George Bell's The Green Turban, was amongst the other works she describes, by H.B. Harrison, Blamire Young, Charles Wheeler's nude And So the Story Ends, and J. S. MacDonald's own The Red Gum Tree at the metropolitan golf links. Allen notes that representation from New South Wales and other states was lower in numbers and "slighter in quality". John Rowell's Grazing Paddocks was purchased from the exhibition by the National Gallery of Victoria.

Other exhibitors included A. Colquhoun, Norman MacGeorge, Napier Waller, John Longstaff, Norman Carter, Harry B. Harrison, W. D. Knox, James Jackson, John D. Moore, W. J. Newbury, William Rowell, Norman MacGeorge, J. S. Macdonald, Vida Lahey, A.M.E. Bale, Carl Hampel, Dora Wilson, Harold Herbert, Murray Griffin, Thea Proctor, Blamire Young, B. E. Minns, Sydney Ure Smith, Daryl Lindsay, and Victor Zelman.

On 15 November, guests of honour at the annual dinner were George Pitt Morison, Chief Curator of the Western Australian Museum and Art Gallery; lawyer and newspaper proprietor Theodore Fink; and Rupert Bunny, on a visit from Paris, was reported as predicting that Australia was "finding herself" in the new field of artistic expression, and that in "time to come the beauty of the land would inspire a new vision in painting, which would reveal itself in mural decoration, as well as in the painting of the studio picture." Architect Desbrowe Annear, also attending, spoke of the influence of the painter on the architect.

While the show was still on display a bridge party played in the gallery raised £35 in funds for Merric Boyd whose Murrumbeena home, pottery and kiln were destroyed in a fire. Among the card players were women artists Margaret Baskerville, Jessie Traill, Dora Wilson and wives of artists of the Association.

=== 1927 ===
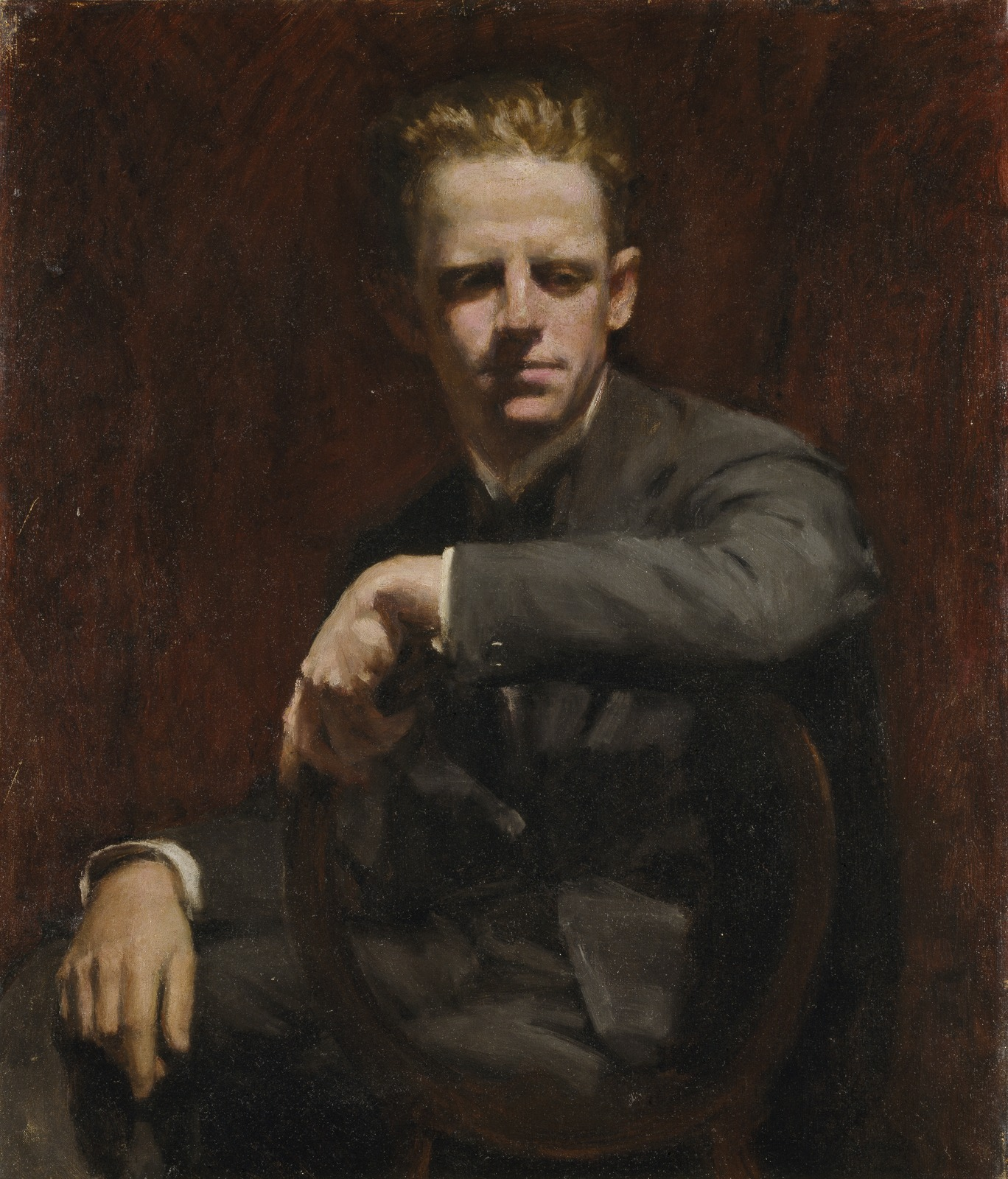
A.M.E. Bale (c.1924-1927) Portrait of William Rowell. Oil on canvas 73.6 x 61.3 cm. State Library of Victoria

When McInnes's painting "spurned" by the NGV won the 1926 Archibald prize, it was purchased on 27 January by the Art Gallery of New South Wales for 400 guineas, 100 less than offers he'd received privately.

In February, with the visit of the Duke and Duchess of York imminent, a request came from the Federal Capital Commission to the Australian Art Association for loans of 150 artworks to hang in the official residences of the Governor-General and Prime Minister in Canberra. Initially favoured by "genial" AArtA president John Longstaff, the suggestion was scorned as "cheap" and "an insult" by McInnes, when interviewed as a representative of the Association, a reaction seconded by Walter Baldwin Spencer and Dr S. A. Ewing, who remarked that Commonwealth Government should take steps immediately to form a national collection of paintings by Australian artists instead of wasting time by appealing to them tor a loan of their works. However, in a 9 March meeting at Charles Wheelers's studio Longstaff moved, with Harold Herbert and George Bell seconding and McInnes opposed, the Association relented and agreed to loan the paintings.

Members Harrison (in March), Rowell (June) and MacGeorge (July) held individual exhibitions before, on 4 October, arrangements were made for the annual Association show, with 116 paintings by 32 artists, to be held at the Athenaeum from 17 November, with the State Governor invited to launch it, though given the short notice, the opening speaker role was filled by Theodore Fink. Just returned from Europe and exhibitions in Paris and London, where he found "great interest...in art circles in the work of Australians," he enthused that "back here, I am delighted to feel that the Australian school of painting is so fresh, vital and invigorating."

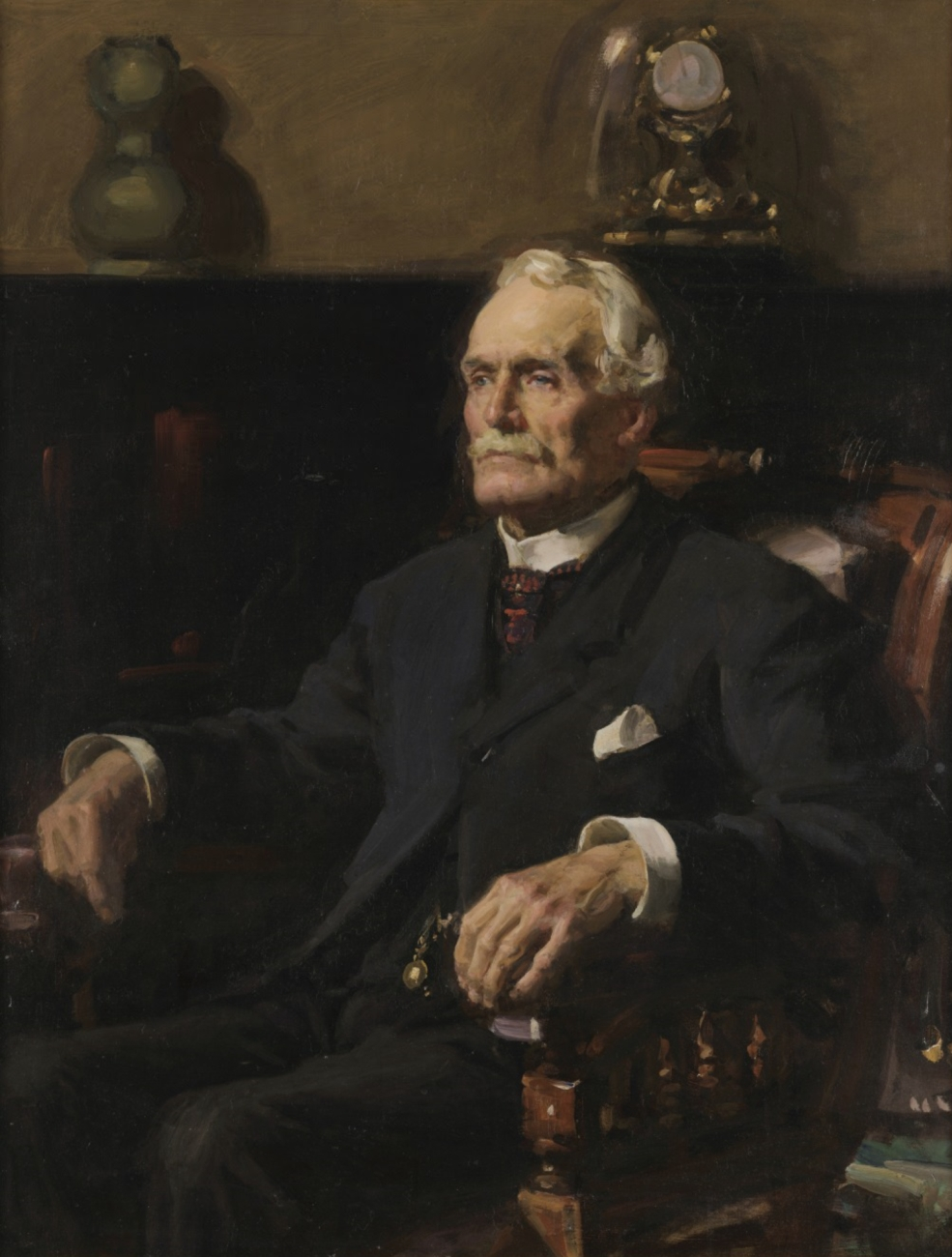
John Longstaff (1927) HCA Harrison, Melbourne Cricket Club Museum collection

Alexander Colquhoun, who in the previous year had become The Age critic, wrote that: "Though the A.A.A. is in one sense a conservative body, its attitude toward art and the artist is a liberal one, embracing in its aims and objective, not only the work or outside local painters who come in as invitees, but also that of artists of repute from other States, thus insuring the comprehensive and national character of the eshibitions. Many members of the association being portrait painters of distinction, this branch of art is strongly in evidence, and while the landscapes make a brave show, and include much that is worthy of note, the chief interest of the exhibition centres round the figure work..."

George Bell in The Sun also gave prominence to the portraits; Longstaff's of footballer H.C.A. Harrison as "an outstanding example of characterisation," and A.M.E. Bale's portrait of artist William Nicholas Rowell (brother of Association member John) as "boldly treated. J. S. MacDonald in The Herald likewise considered the portraits 'strong', especially Charles Wheeler's "Madame Kawamura" which he describes as "painted with great distinction. Full of strength, it is yet replete with subtleties, which only disclose themselves gradually, and show how much has been packed into this extremely able canvas."

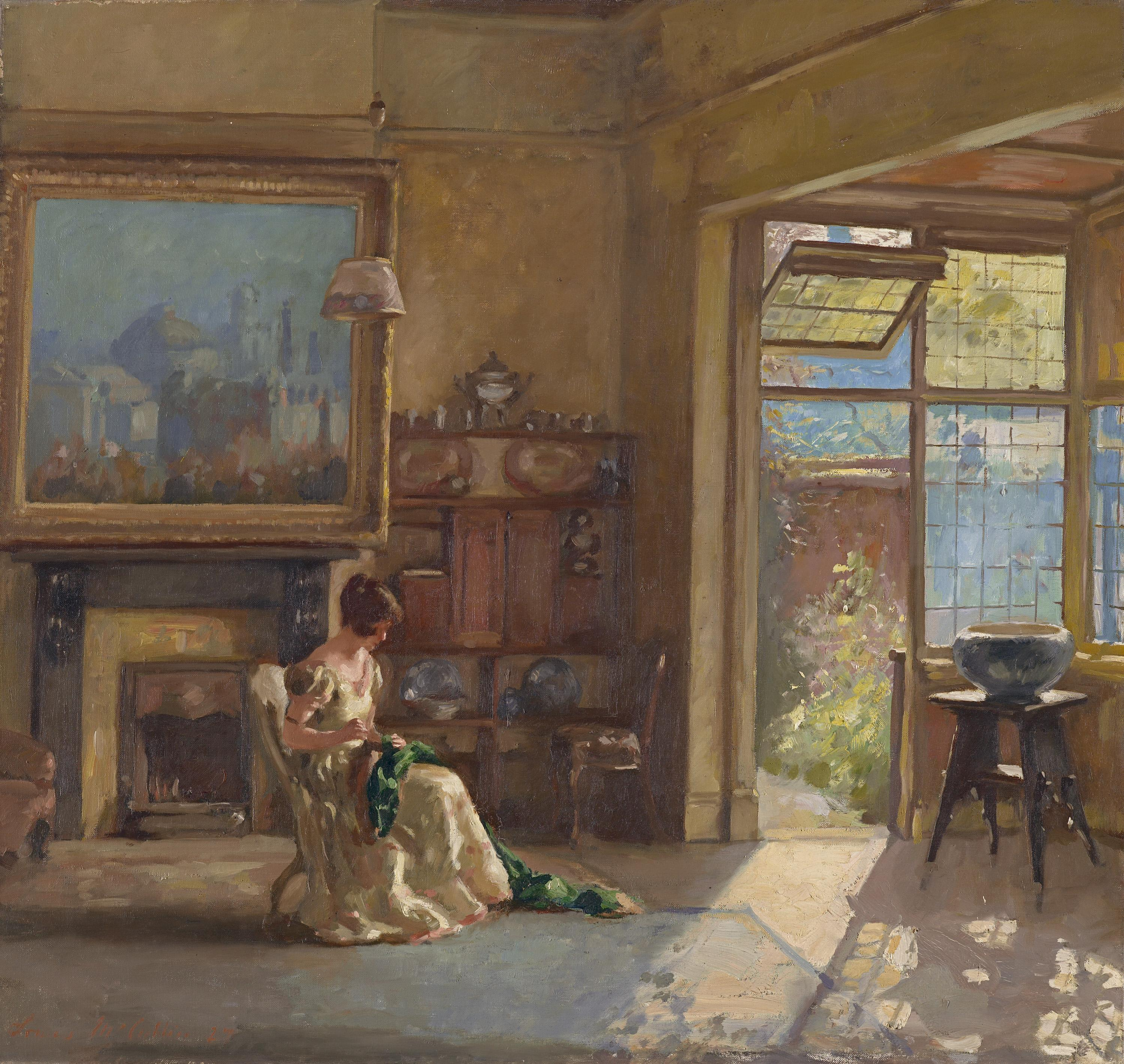
Louis McCubbin (1927) An interior, oil on canvas 71.6 × 76.0 cm National Gallery of Victoria

At a time when, as The Herald correspondent pointed out, the Felton Bequest, and especially its London advisor Frank Rinder, were under public scrutiny for expensive purchases of European art, by the second day of the exhibition the National Gallery of Victoria had purchased Louis McCubbln's An Interior, and The Promise of Spring, by Victor Zelman.

The Mercury noted that "Mr. Eldershaw was missing this year, but he generally makes Tasmania pleasantly conspicuous in the association's exhibition," and Clewin Harcourts return from four years in Belgium and England was reported.

=== 1928 ===
In January John Longstaff, then president the AArtA and formerly of the Society of Australian Artists, was knighted, and later an Association dinner held in his honour at Melbourne's Occidental Hotel, on 29 September. Clewin Harcourt independently exhibited over April at the New Gallery 58 images made during his time in Europe. Also at the same gallery in the following month was held a posthumous retrospective of Edward Officer, first president of the Association. The opening was attended by Longstaff, Harcourt and Bunny.

The controversy over the expense of purchases through the Felton Bequest of European art, on advice from England by Frank Rinder, was joined publicly by the Association in querying the selection process, through a letter from its secretary Charles Hosking to the editors of The Herald and The Age in which they asserted that "An artist or artists are the only possible experts for the purchase of Works of Art."

On 24 October Association member, guide at the Victorian National and Bendigo Galleries, and Herald art critic James S. MacDonald was recommended for appointment as director and secretary of the National Art Gallery in Sydney. Louis McCubbln remarked that MacDonald would "be greatly missed here, where he is quite a force in Art. His pungent criticisms, written with telling force, have had a stimulating effect on the work of Victorian artists, and have had the effect of directing public attention to artists and their work. One thing in particular about Mr MacDonald is that he was never afraid to speak his mind, and in that way he has done a great deal for Art."

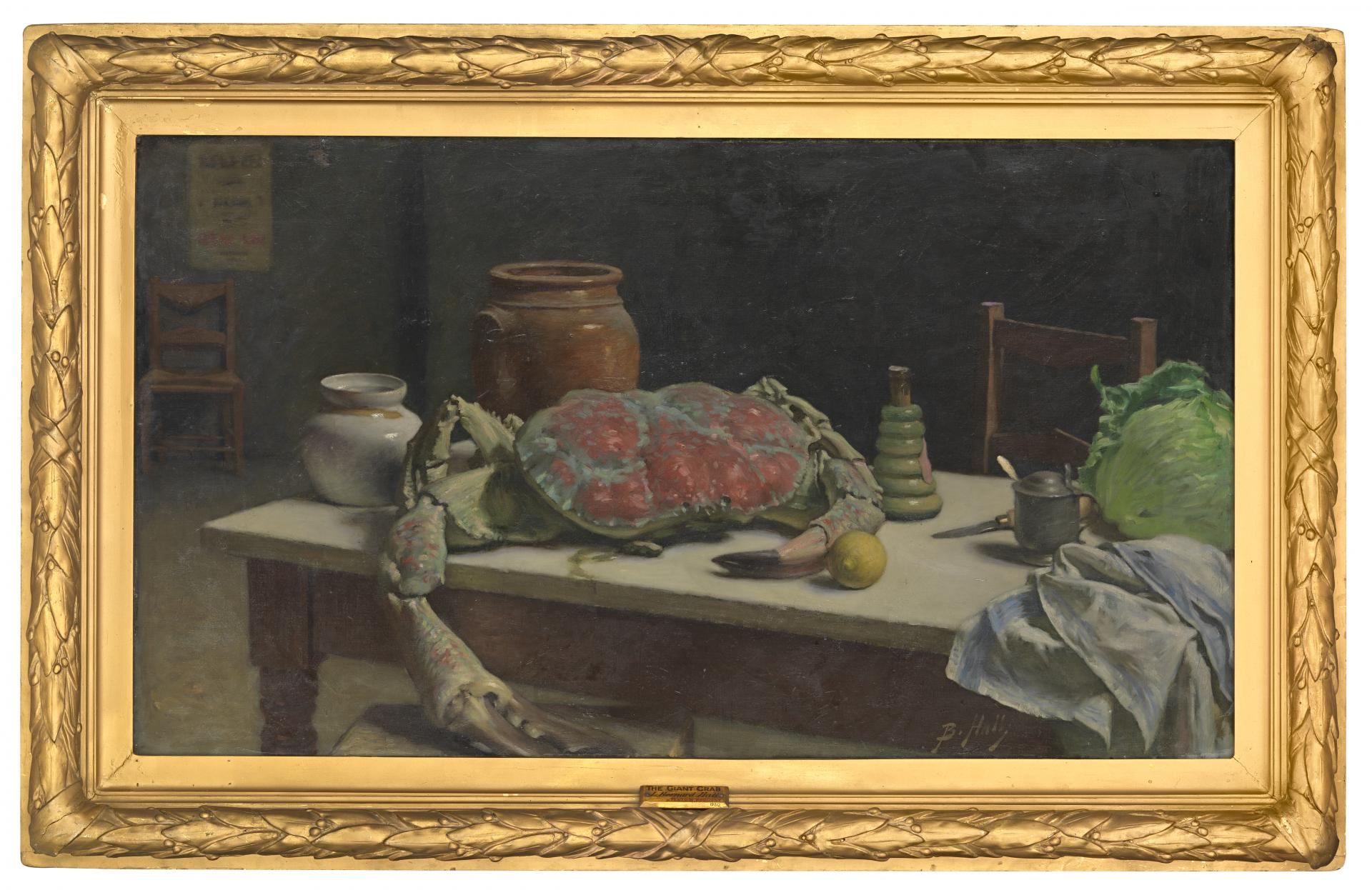
Bernard Hall (1928) The Giant Crab, oil on canvas 63.6 × 111.8 cm. Felton Bequest purchase (1930) National Gallery of Victoria, Melbourne

The annual exhibition was held 15–30 November 1928, again at the Athenaeum and was opened by Sir Leo Cussen, then president of the trustees of the National Gallery of Victoria and Public Library. As noted by The Mercury; "Many members of the association are unrepresented, because they have been busy on private business, or, like Mr. Septimus Power, have held one-man shows of their own."

Bernard Hall's The Giant Crab attracted J. S. MacDonald's attention as "a tour de force of still life painting...One can hardly Imagine a better piece of painting than this rosy-green crustacean. All his crusty, submarine, nipping essence is in this glorious depiction, and he dominates the picture so that one only looks at the other objects there as an afterthought".

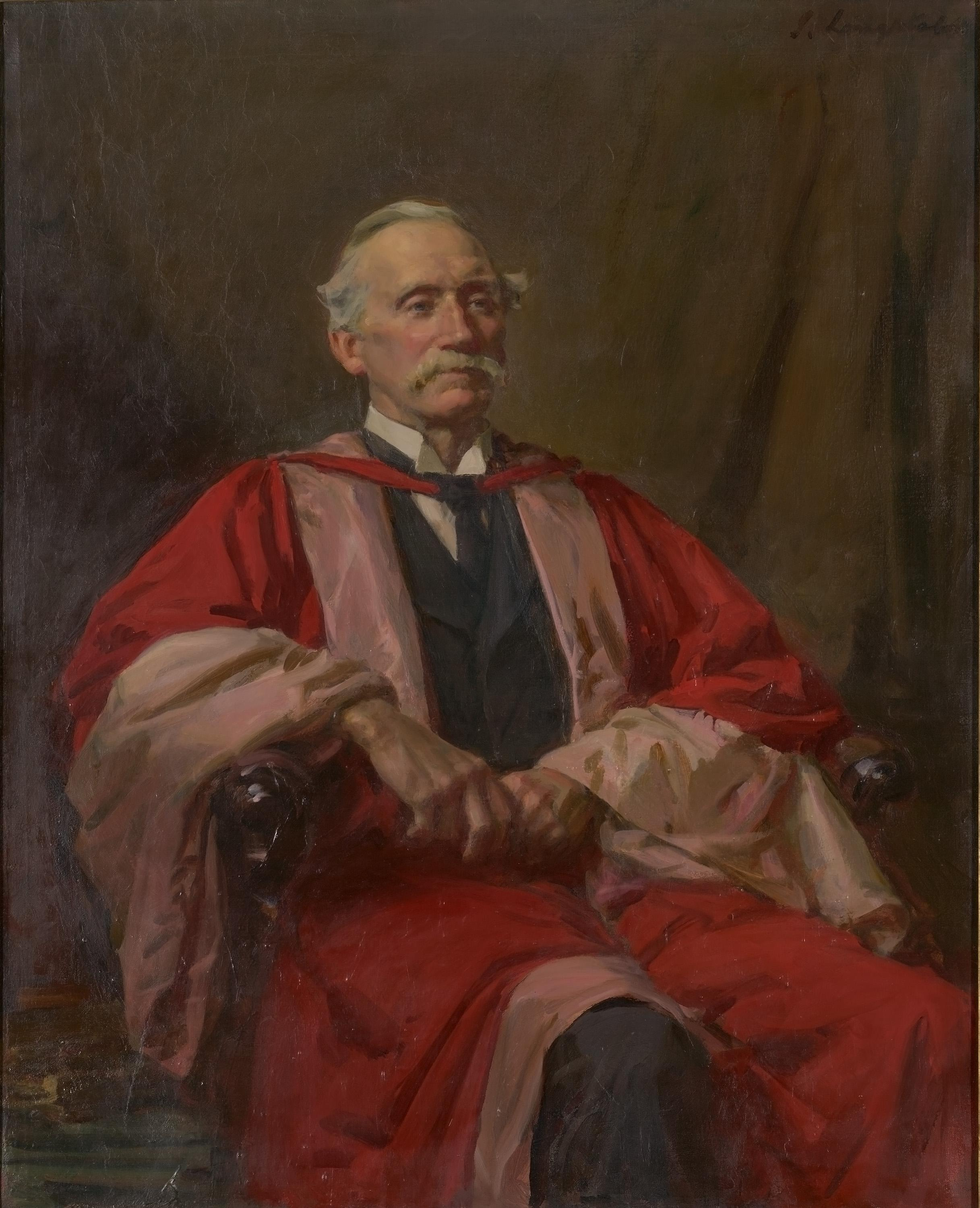
John Longstaff (1927) Dr Alexander Leeper, oil on canvas 115.2 × 93.0 cm. National Gallery of Victoria, Melbourne. Felton Bequest

The Age highlighted Longstaff's Dr Alexander Leeper, and portraits by others including W.B. McInnes, George Bell, H. B. Harrison and A. D. Colquhoun, as well as the landscapes by Zelman, Knox, Rowell, Newbury, Jackson, Wheeler, Macgeorge, Seaman, A.M.E. Bale, L. McCubbin, Herbert, and invitee Ernest Buckmaster, and added that Will Dyson's etchings and drawings were of "exceptional interest". The Argus found the show "well up to the standard of previous displays" by the group, also foregrounding Longstaff's handling of the Leeper portrait in which he solved the "colour problem" of the red academic gown by keeping it "subject to the light which passes over it." The Argus review gave space to works by Daryl Lindsay, attention which was amplified by another MacDonald review, in which he also has rare praise for a woman artist, in his admission that Jo Sweatman's two entries were "done with her customary sincerity and adhesion to high principles." His remark, that Colquhoun's 'erudite' landscapes "rebuke the present clever generation", is illustrative of his notorious anti-modernism.

Shortly after the exhibition, the annual dinner was held at the Oriental Hotel, as usual exclusively for male members and guests. They were the politician Sir William Alexander Watt, Sir Leo Cussen, visiting Italian painter Count Tamburini, who declared his astonishment at the 'beauty of your galleries in every state', journalist Leonard Vivian Biggs, and architect Desbrowe Annear. J. S. MacDonald, was present and his imminent departure to the Sydney state gallery as its director attracted congratulatory comments.

Responding to a toast in his honour president Longstaff spoke deploring the wanton destruction of trees in the Australian countryside, saw-milling in the Cumberland Valley near Marysville being his example, for which he laid the blame on lack of government regulation. His statement was applauded by all and seconded by Arthur Streeton, who proposed an Artists' Council to oversee tree planting in urban Melbourne.

"One question that is above all others in our minds just now concerns the destruction of trees. When I was a boy the north eastern country was beautiful forest, gum, box, and pine. When I returned to it after 20 years it was a featureless waste. This is an agricultural country, and trees must be taken away, but there surely can be no excuse for removing all the trees from every part of the State. There seems to be no regard for trees.

Longstaff's lament and Streeton's suggestion were covered in all the other Melbourne, and some interstate and national, papers.

Summing up the year, William Moore in the Brisbane Courier noted that, aside from its Victorians: "The membership of the Australian Art Association includes 10 New South Wales artists, a Tasmanian and also a South Australian artist. The work of non-members, however, cannot be submitted for selection; but every year two or three artists are invited to show with the society."

=== 1929 ===
==== Women leaders in art ====
Critic William Moore continued to survey Australian art his essays and, published in the Brisbane Courier on 16 March 1929, is one in which he deplores the scarcity of women on councils of art societies, with only the Royal Queensland Art Society in which they were the majority of council members. He writes that elsewhere, Ethel Stephens was once elected a member of council of the Royal Art Society of N.S.W., but no woman had since; on the council of Sydney's Society of Artists was Adelaide Perry; in 1921 Eirene Mort was elected a member of the Australian Painter Etchers' Society council, but no woman after her. None were on those of the Australian Art Association and the Victorian Artists' society, but:

For some years Elizabeth Armstrong has been a vice president of the South Australian society of Arts, and A. M. E. Bale is a member of the council of the Twenty Melbourne Painters Society. The only woman who Is a trustee of a gallery is Vida Lahey, who is a member of the Board of Advice of the Queensland National Art Gallery. I may add here that the Royal Academy has now a woman associate In the person of Laura Knight, who was recently made a Dame of the British Empire.

Moore notes another in a leading position; Mary Cecil Allen [who, before departing for America, exhibited with the AArtA in 1925 and 1926] "who belongs to a small group of artists like Blamire Young, Hardy Wilson, Lionel Lindsay, Max Meldrum, J. S. Macdonald, and Hugh McCrae, who can write almost as well as they can draw and paint," was a successful lecturer on art as a guide at the NGV, then in New York, where she published in 1928 The Mirror of the Passing World, and in 1929 Painters of the modern mind.

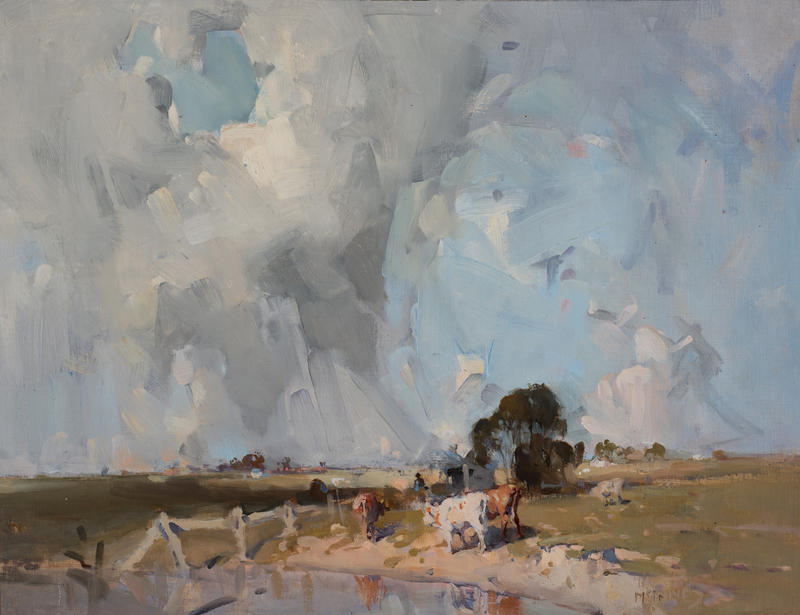
W.B. McInnes (c.1916) Drifting Clouds, oil on canvas mounted on cardboard 45.5 x 59.5 cm. Castlemaine Art Museum

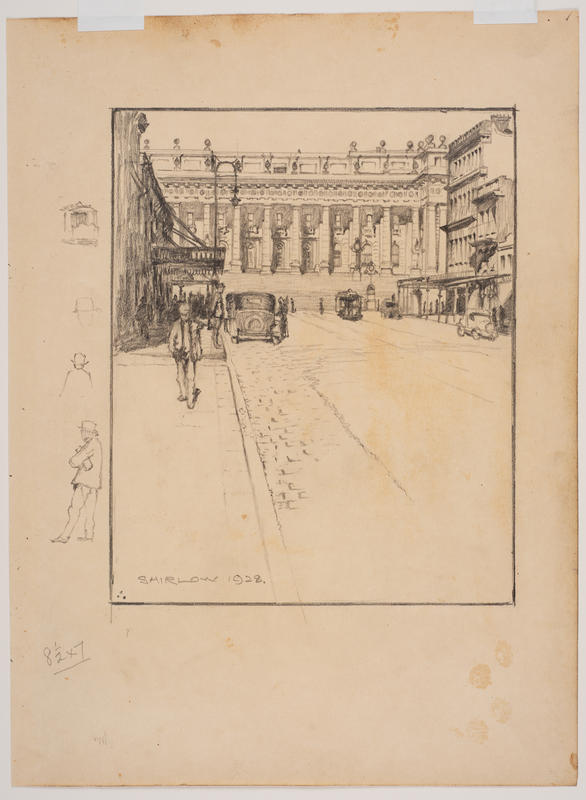
John Shirlow (1928) Parliament House, Melbourne, pencil drawing, 34.5 x 25.0 cm

==== Profiles ====
An uncredited profile of John Longstaff, also written by Moore, appeared on 2 April in the Brisbane Telegraph, one of its series titled 'Famous Artists', which comments that "though never a seeker after office, [Longstaff] accepted, a few years ago, the presidency of the Australian Art Association, a position which he now fills resourcefully, and with a single eye to the artists interests of the association, and of the community generally."

Likewise, Associate W. Beckwith McInnes was the subject of one of features in The Age titled 'Australian Artists of Today' which lists purchases by public galleries of his work exhibited with the AArtA including Haymaking and The Grey Road in Sydney; Jewish Quarters, Morocco in Brisbane, and Drifting Clouds, shown at the Royal Institute, London, and Ploughing, purchased by the Castlemaine gallery.

Others, appearing monthly in an Age newspaper series, covered Association members. The first, on Harold Herbert, places him as "an active and valued, member of all the leading art societies throughout Australia, including the Australian Art Association of Melbourne" and L. Bernard Hall, as a "regular contributor to the Australian Art Association, and Victorian artists' exhibitions"; the next interviewed, John Shirlow, is "known in this city as a constant exhibitor various mediums at the Victorian Artists' Society's, the Australian Art Association's and other exhibitions"; Norman Macgeorge who, in the Australian Art Association, si acknowledged as having "taken an active part, filling at different times, with credit and efficiency, the offices of president and secretary. While never ranking among the conspicuously best sellers, there has al-ways been a consistent demand for his landscapes, particularly among private buyers, while one of his larger canvases, Mother of Pearl, has found a place in the National Gallery, and another has been purchased for the Canberra collection".

A.M.E. Bale was featured in the August Age episode whose anonymous author, with some consciousness of emerging 'equal opportunity' becoming topical, proposes that 'many' professional women artists need "no concession to justify a claim to equality," yet attributes sexual difference and lesser "powers of endurance," rather than systemic exclusion, to their underrepresentation. Quotations from Bale herself in the article frame her as conservative, scornful of the "childish petulance and arrogance" of attention-seeking "ultra-moderns", and sympathetic with Rinder and his purchases of European masterworks for the NGV via the Felton Bequest, expressing regret over the "importunate carping" of his critics

The popular landscape painting of A. E. Newbury, and his colleagues the brothers Rowell in a style considered novel, is represented, in the August edition, as due to Max Meldrum's influence, though Newbury is quoted as insisting he was not his 'follower' or 'student,' but attracted only to "a belief in his greatness as a painter and the soundness and of his views on art." Noting that Newbury had never been abroad, and asking him to give opinion on purchases for the Felton Bequest, the author finds in the painter's naming only three, including Corot's The Bent Tree, an indication "of a mind well in tune with the more subtle and beautiful aspects of Nature;" a profile of John Rowell followed, introduced with a position that "an indoor training," [implying that provided by Meldrum] "intended for the development of the portrait painter, is by no means misapplied [to] the plein-airist, to whom knowledge of form and craftsmanship, are quite as indispensable. In Australian landscape the gum tree, with its intricate, sparsely covered limbs, makes a special claim in this respect." Another reason for Rowell's success, is given as his having "an intimate understanding of the things he paints—an understanding based not so much on theory as upon a closeness to Nature and all her varying charms and inconsistencies." Rowell is credited with being "a tremendous worker" who "besides exhibiting with the Australian Art Association, the Victorian Artists Society and the Twenty Melbourne Painters, of which he is a foundation member, has held numerous one-man shows in Melbourne, Sydney and Adelaide" and with works in public collections, at time of writing, in the public galleries of Melbourne, Sydney, Canberra, Adelaide, Ballarat and Castlemaine".

==== Exhibitions ====
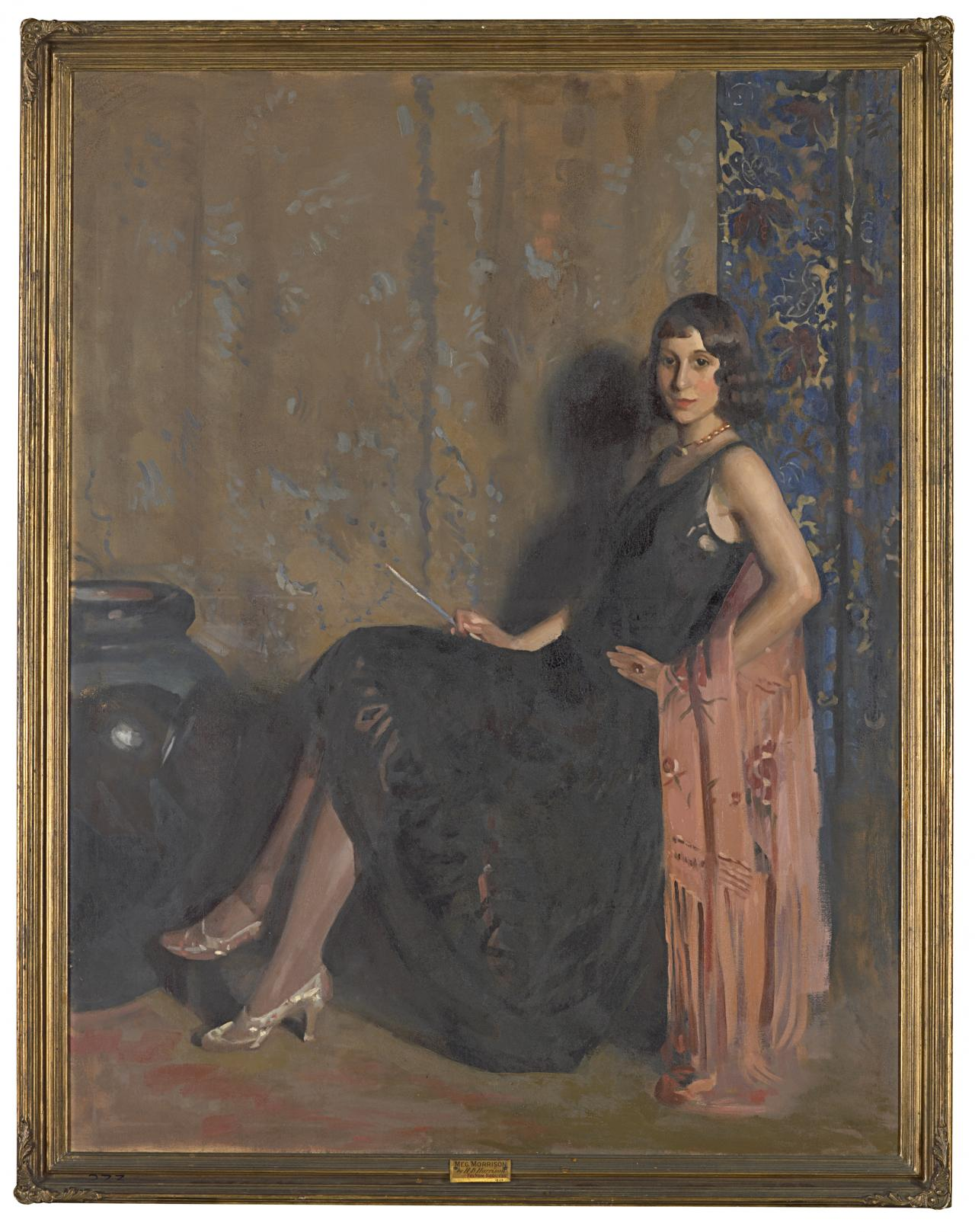
Harry B. Harrison (c. 1929) Meg Morrison, oil on canvas, 160.0 × 122.8 cm. National Gallery of Victoria, Melbourne

In October, Shirlow opened a posthumous retrospective of watercolours by AArtA member Alexander McClintock. That was followed on 8 November, also at the Athenaeum, by the opening by Senator R. D. Elliott of the annual Association show, to which only members, and no invitees, were shown due to space restrictions. Blamire Young, MacDonald's replacement as art critic on The Herald, tempted audiences with reference to a "mysterious sitter" in George Bell's freshly painted portrait Lady with a Necklace.

Bernard Hall's achievement of "a complete sense of unity and one of the best revelations of colour he has yet shown" in his nude study The model and the globe was admired by Arhur Streeton in The Argus, and purchased for the NGV, as was, for 200 guineas, H.B. Harrison's portrait of the sophisticate in Meg Morrison, described by George Bell in his review of the exhibition in The Sun: "The girlish figure in black seated against a background of hangings and draped with a pink shawl is a most satisfying composition of excellent design and skilfully controlled ensemble." The Felton Bequest also acquired Charles Wheeler's Reverie. Dora Wilson's six offerings were painted in France, she and her companions Pegg Clarke and Madge Henderson having just returned in September.

The state gallery in South Australia purchased from the annual exhibition, a Daryl Lindsay still life which it described in The Chronicle as "an excellent piece of flower painting [which] shows this artist entertaining a new feld of expression. The work is modern, and the color scheme beautiful."

==== Australian and British art ====
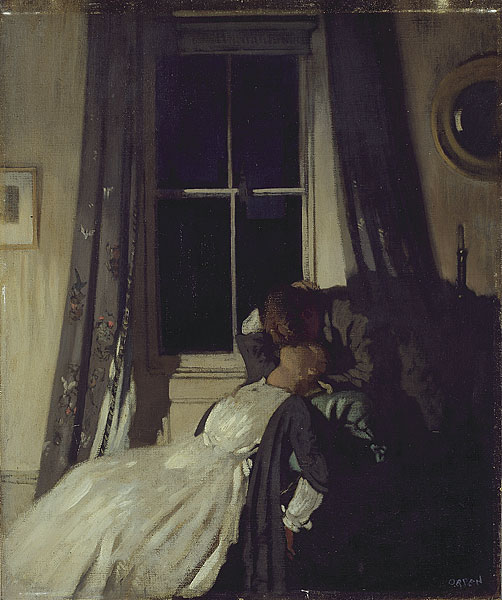
Sir William Orpen (1907) Night, oil on canvas 76.5 cm x 64 cm. National Gallery of Victoria, Felton Bequest, 1929

Percy Leason in his Table Talk review of concurrent shows topically compares the AArtA annual exhibition with Contemporary British Art hosted by the Victorian Artists' Society to question the "benefits to Australian art that...come out of importing...British art." By his comparison he finds that artists in both countries are doing "pretty much the same thing" with the Australians doing it just as well or better. Names amongst the British were notable, some aristocratic; Dame Laura Knight, Sir George Clausen, R.A., Herbert Davis Richter, R.O.I., R.I., Harry Watson, R.W.S., Terrick Williams, A.R.A., V.P.R.I., John Arnesby Brown, R.A., Harold Speed, R.P., but he found "they soon say all they have to say" and were "looking tired," while in "three A's' exhibition "there is a great deal that breathes fresh air—certainly it is often in a some what gasping way and some of it gives up the ghost on careful examination. But there is not the same all-pervading tired-picture-making atmosphere about the Australian exhibition...there are more pictures that approach the unity and life that conies with research into the field of ' natural light." He concludes with the news that Night by Sir William Orpen, one he considered an 'also-ran' in the British show and "the weaker" of his two entries, a "very dull and uninteresting picture...lifeless " had been purchased by the trustees of the NGV for 600 guineas; a case of "getting not so much the best art as the best names". Additional acquisitions of British art were the painting Rose Petals," by W. E. Webster, RP. R.O.I. and two etchings, Richmond Castle and Advocates' Close, Edinburgh by Albany E. Howarth, R.E.

Alexander Colquhoun (signing himself A.C.) in The Age reviews James S. MacDonald's 1929 Australian Landscape Painters of Today, released by Art in Australia. Most of the artists whose works are illustrated with 52 plates, 20 in colour, were members or associates of AArtA. While generally favourable, he notes:

While art in the old world has been of late years going through an evolutionary and revolutionary stage of fermentation, provocative of some strange divergencies from the beaten track, it is worthy of note how little our antipodian orthodoxy has been disturbed by it. This immobility is not in any way a result of our isolation, for we have kept well in touch with the times, and are familiar with most of the anarchist phases in art which have come and gone in the last ten years. A reference to the pages of this book will reveal traces of a "movement," not the robust movement of a Picasso or a Matisse, but a rather half-hearted tendency to stray just far enough to be a bit queer and distinctive, without committing oneself to anything so irrevocable as a burning of boats.

The annual Association dinner guests at the Menzies Hotel were politicians William Watt, Theodore Fink and Senator R. D. Eliott, educationist Ponsonby May Carew-Smyth, and president of the Castlemaine Art Gallery, Dr. James L. Thompson. The Age reported the approval of expansion of the National Gallery in Swanston Street and noted that on 18 December AArtA president Longstaff would judge the National Gallery School student exhibition, to choose the recipient of the traveling scholarship (won that year by Constance Stokes).

=== 1930 ===
Amidst forebodings of the coming the economic emergency of the Great Depression the year opened with a discussion of the pricing of paintings, sparked by a 2 January opinion piece in The Age, which asked "whether in Australia people fail to attend art exhibitions not because of indifference, but because they are under the impression that original paintings are not to be had except at a prohibitive figure." AArtA member Norman MacGeorge's response was reported the next day in which he asserted that "It was a good thing in a way that the price of some work was high—and two or three artists were getting very high prices for their work!—because thus the standard value of paintings was kept up...If works of art were cheaper the effect would not be beneficial." Given the increasing costs of framing and mounting a show "he did not consider £20 [2025 value: A$1,838.40] excessive for a moderate sized water color." George Bell, in the same article, was quoted as saying " People buy pictures only when they had so much money that they could not spend it on anything else."

Dora Wilson followed up her showing in the 1929 annual Association exhibition of works made while touring France, with a solo show at the Fine Art Society gallery in March.

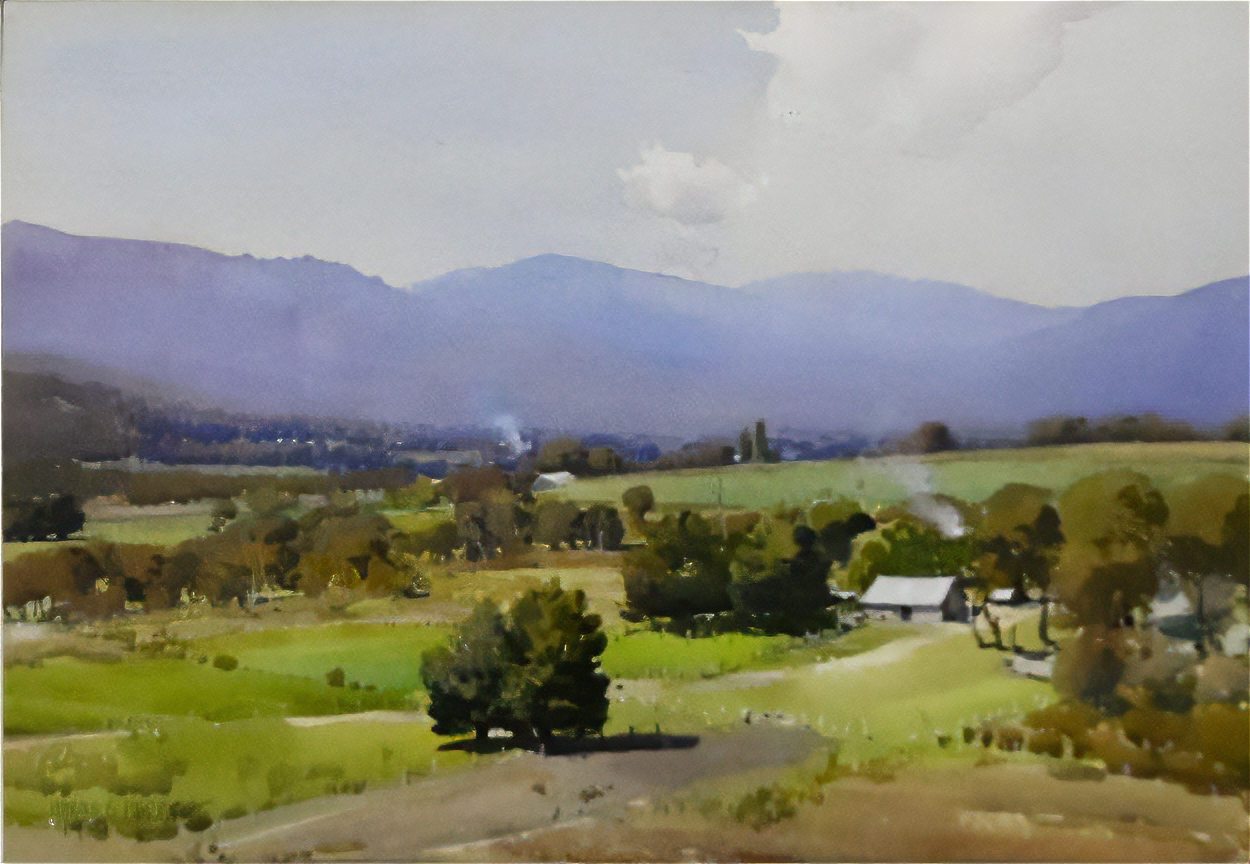
Harold B Herbert (1930) The Smiling Valley, watercolour 32x43cm

When George Lambert, who had joined the Association's shows as an invitee in 1913, 1921, and 1922, died on 29 May, Longstaff told The Sun that the group was preparing a wreath and would assist the Sydney artists with a Lambert Memorial.

In August it was announced that the Association had been offered an exhibition in January 1931, at New York's Roerich Museum, which would fund transport and catalogue. The show, the first major group exhibition of Australian art there, was arranged through Commissioner-General for Australia in the United States, Herbert Brookes, who in his letter communicating the news, wrote that "he is everywhere questioned concerning Australian art. Has Australia any part of her own? What is Australian landscape like? Has Australia a native art to build upon like that of the American Indian?" While arrangements were being made to have all their work framed by John Thallon, and shipping scheduled for November, Mary Allen, who had settled in America after exhibiting as an Associate in 1925 and 1926, would "look after the interests" of the artists whose landscapes particularly would find more interest from American audiences, she felt, who would find their 'bleached colour' much like their own, unlike the English, who were used to 'vivid colorings'. The Royal British Colonial Society of Artists notifed Australian art societies that it also would hold an exhibition; Overseas Art would show at the Royal Academy in London.

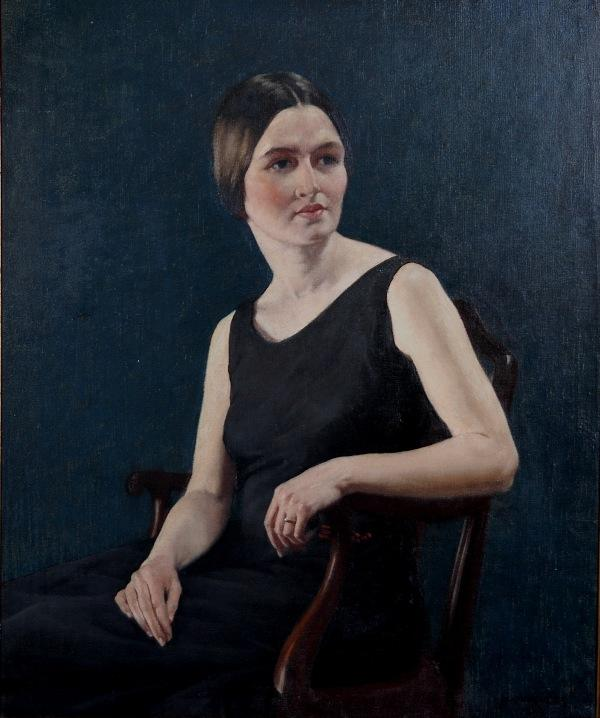
Norman St. Clair Carter (1928) Lady in Black. Oil on canvas, 91 x 76 cm

In noting that the annual AArtA exhibition would open on 29 October that year, influential detractor of modernism Harold Herbert, in The Australasian, remarked that such shows "might be very much improved by the elimination of many small sketchy and unimportant pictures." The exhibition overlapped that year with that of the rival Victorian Artists' Society, and was to be opened by Acting Governor-General Lord Somers who in the event was replaced by the Lord Mayor Harold Luxton.

The Age reviewer gives top billing to Longstaff, McInnes, Bernard Hall, Wheeler and Harrison, but next notes two works by Sydney artist Norman Carter, remarking that Lady In Black gave "the impression that he has been experimenting in tones and edges...the edges are so sharp and insisted upon as to detract from the suggestion of contour in the figure."

Any discussion of the female participants appears only in the last paragraphs, in which Jo Sweatman appears as "Mr. W. Sweatman", and mention of Dora Wilson's The Gentry and "two other studies" comes on the last lines of the review. Invitees for the show included Eric Thake, who had not participated previously, and Murray Griffin.

The Argus review discusses the same portraits, but considers the "most beautiful drawing in show" was Sydney Ure Smith's Harbour Bridge, purchased by Felton Bequest; one of a series that the artist was making of the construction. Harold Herbert also praised the work, and rated A. E. Newbury's portrait entry: "one of his masterpieces. It is a complete illusion, and so well painted and modelled the eyes in particular." Of A. D. Colquhoun's "East and West" he remarks that it is "a typical example of [his] method of painting —planes and tone values correct, but lacking extra drawing and finish that, to this critic's mind, is a definite requirement. Table Talk singles out Harry B. Harrison's "study of a girl in a vivid shawl [which] has achieved a smile almost as intriguing as the celebrated Mona Lisa, and the eyes are alert and beautiful," but "the face has been worked at too much." A. D. Colquhoun's East and West is considered "curiously arresting," while John Rowell's The Blue Pool which "shines like a jewel in the landscape," and Summer Haze "lingers in the memory." Vida Lahey's Fruit and Flowers was purchased from the exhibition by the National Gallery.

At the end of December Harold Herbert contributed to The Australasian a discussion of 'Portrait Painting in Australia' devoted to favourable reviews mostly of works by members of the Association, "of differing styles, yet embracing a common aim in sincere and truthful representation," but an makes ambivalent mention of "the disciples of Mr. Max Meldrum [who] showed during the year an extraordinary diversity of stuff—from well-studied self-portraits to slight sketchy, impressionistic efforts. "It's there," with these painters, the failure is in the crude presentment."

=== 1931 ===
Alexander Colquhoun in his series 'Australian Painters of Today' in The Age wrote on William D. Knox and his early success in selling a small work to Lord Northcliff at an Association exhibition in 1922, a typical example of his "landscapes of the scenic type, depictive of wide open spaces and melting distance; but he is also noted as a painter of shipping subjects, and shows a skill in treating of the anatomy of boats which is not given to every outdoor worker." Colquhoun notes that Knox's representation overseas included his contribution of Near Lillydale to the 1923 exhibition of Australian art in London and the one being held contemporaneously with the Age article, in New York. His edition in May of the series covered Louis McCubbin "one of our younger artists" who since he returned from service in WWI and up to 1931, had "held three successful exhibitions in Melbourne, besides exhibiting every year with the Australian Art Association. and less frequently with the Victorian Artiats' Society, and in addition to two paintings in the Melbourne National Gallery, British Fleet, Port Melbourne and Sunlit Interior he is represented in the Ballarat and Castlemaine galleries About two years ago he competed against many brilliant painters for the Crouch memorial prize, and won it."

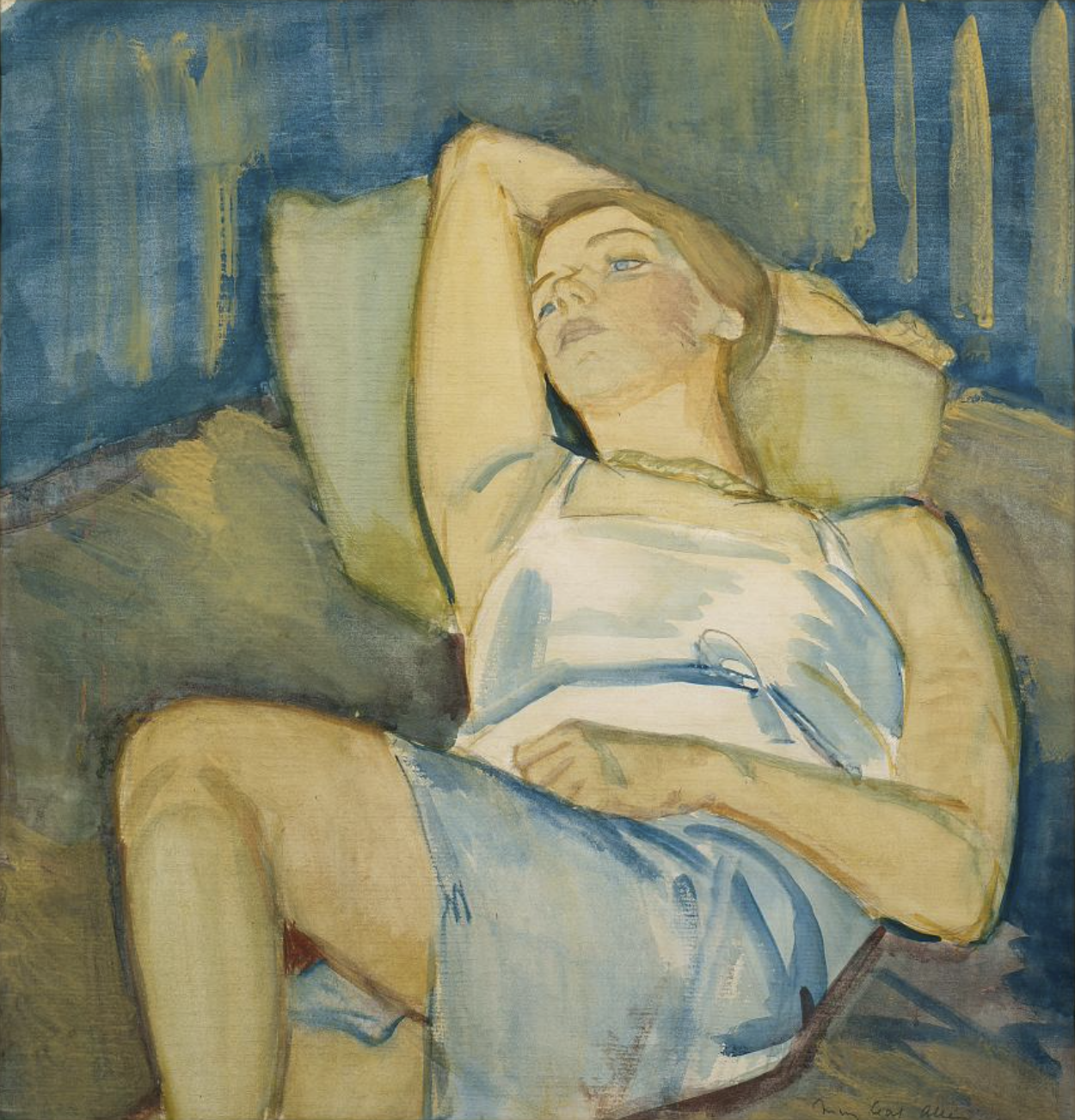
Mary Cecil Allen (1930s) Reclining blue figure, watercolour over pencil, 60.2 × 57.6 cm. National Gallery of Victoria, Melbourne

By June, when Colquhoun profiled AArtA member Mary Cecil Allen, as one who "does not wait for opportunity, but sets out to create or discover it", she had, with Herbert Brookes, husband of her friend Ivy, seen to completion the first exhibition of Australian artists in New York, the First Contemporary All-Australian Art Exhibition, opening in February 1931. Besides her own work, and many AArtA artists including Norman Lindsay, Thea Proctor, and George Bell, former Meldum disciple Clarice Beckett and Sydney artist Dora Toovey, one hundred paintings were shown. The cover of the exhibition catalogue had the Commonwealth coat of arms and a notice of patronage by Prime Minister James Scullin. The article notes that the show followed one in 1930 "opened by Mr. Herbert Brookes [which] was well received by the press and public, and she was at last date of writing getting work together for another show to be held in Philadelphia."

Colquhoun continues that It was no surprise that "her latest work shows the influence of the modernist—or expressionist—to use a more definite term; for her earlier realism...gave the impression of being a compromise between an acquired physical, and an intuitive emotional tendency." Of the two books Allen had by then published in New York, he admits their value in "throwing light on aspects of art which have of late been the occasion of much obscure controversy," and notes that the "lucid and readable dissertation on an expressionism which seeks its inspiration in the unsophistioated art of the child or the primitive" in Painters of the Modern Mind came from Allen's lectures for the Readers Round Table at the New York Public Library, and that she treats it "exhaustively and convincingly from the point of view of an experienced painter who has herself passed through the fire of unsettled convictions."

Also in May William Moore in The Brisbane Courier paid tribute to the quantity and quality of John Longstaff's oeuvre, noting his ongoing roles as president of the Association and trustee of the NGV, and in conclusion: "Genuinely interested in the work of the younger artists, he is always ready to praise where the quality of a painting warrants it." Moore's October column covered Tom Roberts.

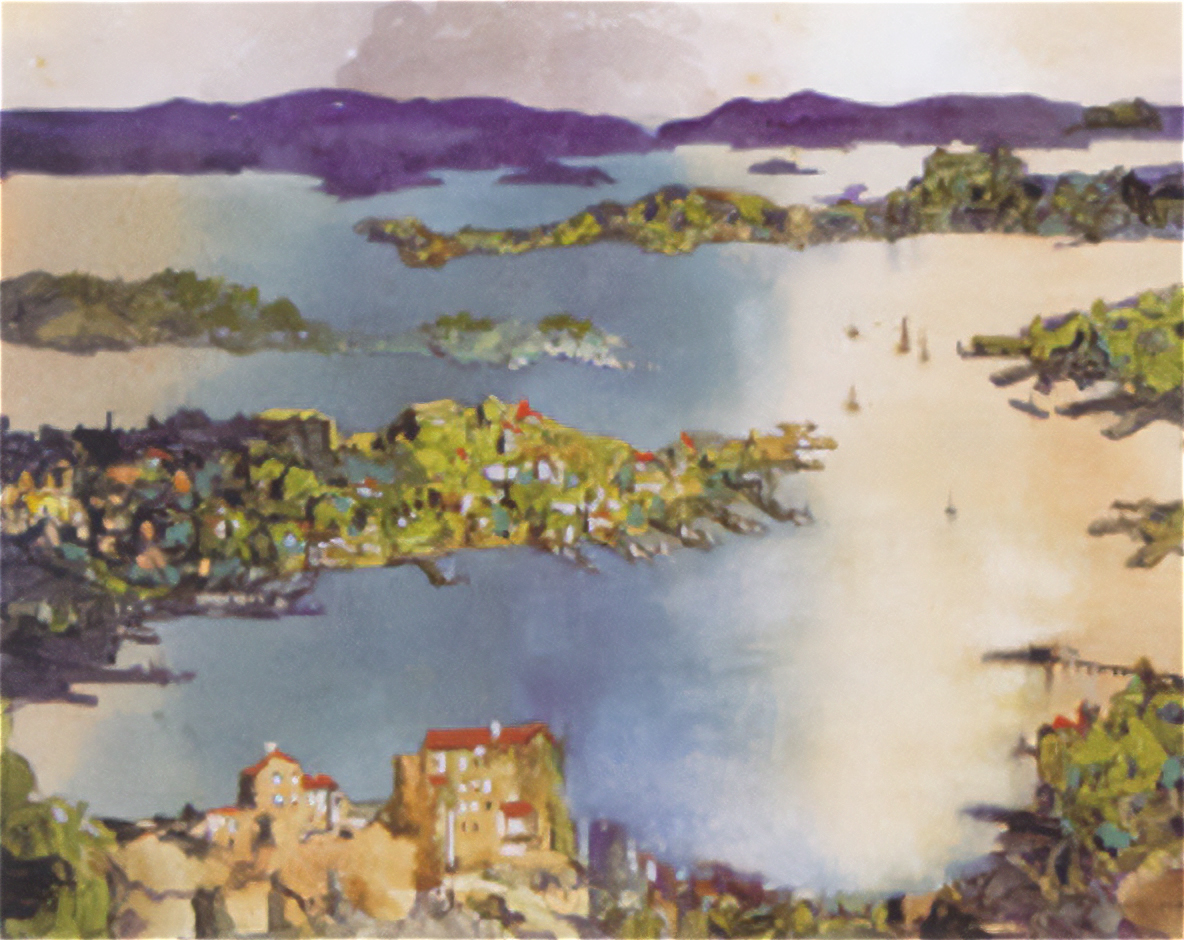
Blamire Young (c.1930) A Landlocked Sea, watercolour and gouache 36 x 48 cm

In August, Harold Herbert in his column in The Australasian discussed 'Etching in Australia' in which he mentions Association member John Shirlow as a 'pioneer of the art' in his country, and Penleigh Boyd, Lionel Lindsay, Hans Heysen, Jessie Traill and Sydney Ure Smith. Noted also is that Norman Lindsay was leaving Australia. Herbert also announces the annual show in November, at the Athenaeum which "in view of 'hard times'" charged seven guineas (2025 value: A$700), a reduction from ten. The show was being managed by William R. Sedon of Sedon Galleries. A private viewing of the annual exhibition, at the Athenaeum, was announced in The Herald for 29 October. Arthur Streeton in his review in the Argus considered the show "not quite up to its usual standard", and once again it was McInnes's portraits which he featured first, for its 'refreshing' painting and its successful 'management of black', while Harry B. Harrison's Nancy, as a sign of straitened times her considered 'harmonious' and 'full of vigour and vitality' but handicapped traces of "another painting beneath the present fine portrait." Perhaps also to save money George Bell showed an older, 1926 painting Flower Piece, now in the NGV, which Streeton praised for its "well modelled" blooms, finishing his review by naming Blamire Young's A Landlocked Sea "one of the delights of the exhibition—a harmony in blue and amber." The Age by contrast considered the exhibition consistent with its usual quality "despite the depressing influence of the times, showing that, however penury may have affected the noble rage of the artists, it has not to any appreciable extent frozen the genial current of their souls," though "A feature of this exhibition is the number of small or moderately sized pictures shown, and though portraiture and figure subjects generally have received a good deal of attention, there is a preponderance of pictures dealing with landscape and still-life." The absence of John Longstaff in Sydney was noted.

== International exposure ==
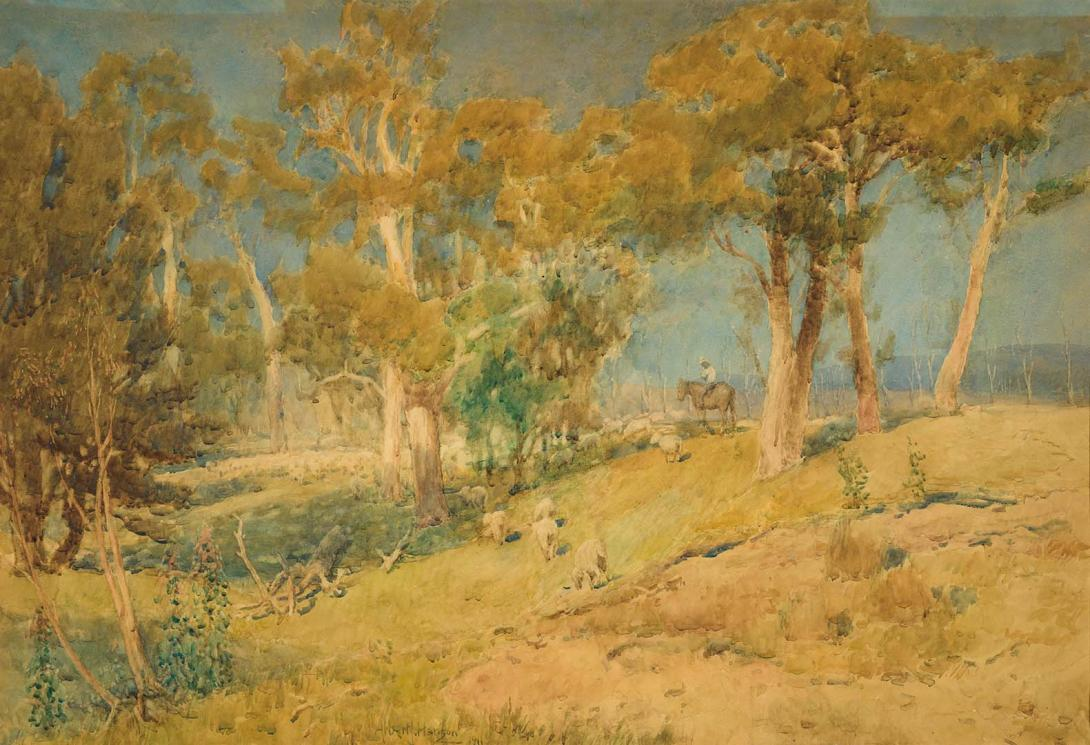
Albert J. Hanson (1911) Fair Droving Weather, watercolour, 62 x 90cm. QAGOMA

The English publication The Studio in a 1914 article 'Australian Landscape Painters' mentions that McCubbin was "one time president of the Victorian Artists Society, but he now belongs to the new Australian Art Association which was started a few months ago by certain members of the older society who were not satisfied with the policy it was pursuing. Mr Withers is also among those who have joined the new body." Sydney artst Albert J. Hanson's 1911 watercolour Fair Droving Weather, was an illustration, and was exhibited in the Association's second, 1914 exhibition; the year of his death.

The 1928 American Christian Science Monitor included an uncredited Melbourne writer's report on 'Art in Australia' in the annual show by the Association,

the chief of its kind in this country, probably represents as fairly as can be the condition of the painting art in this Commonwealth. As an indication of the esteem in which the work of this association is held in England, King George has recently knighted its president, Sir John Longstaff...Far from Montparnasse, Utrillo, Van Dongen and Matisse, painters in the Antipodes probably miss the influences that have acquired vogue and value in the northern hemisphere. Still, to us, most of the current work that at present finds favor abroad seems to be the result of premeditation which Australians, at the risk of being branded as conservative, avoid in favor of the development of the traditions bequeathed us by their artistic ancestors. These beliefs are steadfastly held and are manifested in the bulk of the work of Australia's more accomplished practitioners.

The efforts of Australian entrepreneur Herbert Brookes, who promoted his country in America, persuaded the International Art Center of the Roerich Museum, to accept an exhibition of about a hundred paintings by members of the Australian Art Association for a tour starting in New York early in 1931 and Washington in March, then through American galleries. Included was work by prominent figures; the Association's then president Sir John Longstaff, W. Lister Lister of the Royal Art Society of New South Wales, and Director of the National Gallery of Victoria, Bernard Hall. The American Magazine of Art reported that:

from it one learns that the majority of painters in this far-off land are still working along academic lines, though there are included a few examples of modernistic expression.

== Demise ==
Alan McLeod McCulloch does not explain the Association's 1933 demise other than to say that "interest in the association waned as the original members died", but the Great Depression, very severe in Australia, was in progress which especially affected younger artists, who might otherwise have joined.

Addressing the AartA's ambition to be a national body, as early as 1914 The Argus was commenting that "it is devoutly hoped that the Federal-ness of its aim will assume greater force and definiteness," an aim more nearly achieved in 1937 by the more conservative Australian Academy of Art with government support, though with members not as notable; and independently by the modernist, but factionalised, Contemporary Art Society in 1938. Louis McCubbin, who in 1937 was director of the state gallery in Adelaide, discussed the proposed Art Academy with The News, he recalled that "the last and most ambitious project was the Australian Art Association, founded in 1912. It carried on for more than 20 yeais, but died out three or four years ago." Mr. McCubbin expressed a belief, from his experience of the AArtA, that distance, and the resulting expense to artists of transport was an impediment for an Australian Academy.

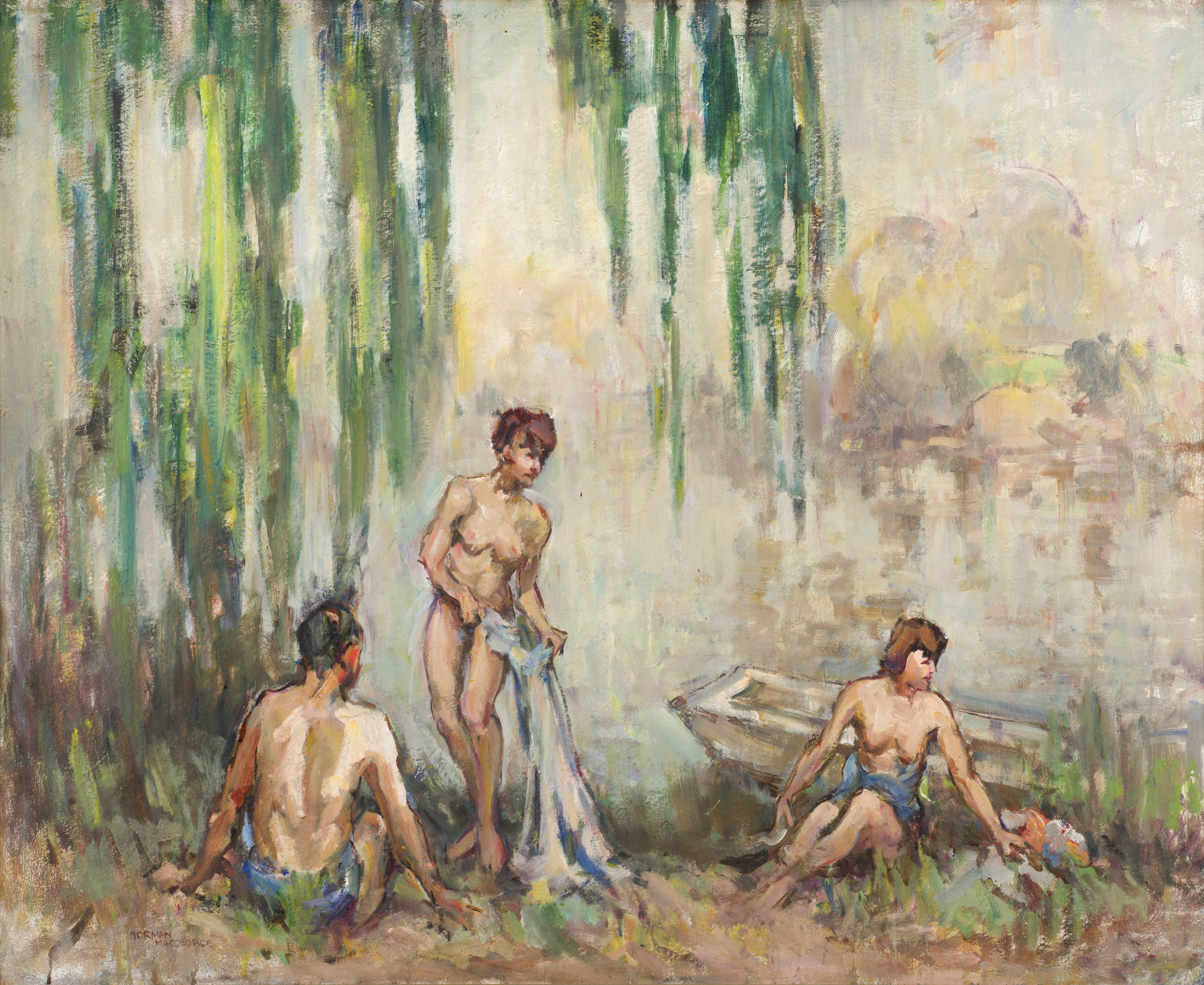
Norman Macgeorge (c.1946) Nudes in a glade oil on canvas, University of Melbourne Collection

With regard to the Association's position within the rise of modernism, Gino NIbbi criticised the parochialism of Australian art being 'stilted and half-dead,' in his Herald review of the 1931 annual exhibition of the Association in which he wrote, as quoted by the Brisbane Courier critic William Moore:

the artists give the impression that they have matured on easy glories tributed to them by the Australian public, which is in its nature enthusiastic. These works, so generical [sic] in quality, are almost totally devoid of personality. We note, for instance, in Mr. L. Bernard Hall's pictures ability irreparably constricted by academic influences, lifeless realities against dead backgrounds. Charles Wheeler appears as an intelligent illustrator, but his manner belongs to our childhood, and is already forgotten. A conventionally treated portrait of a charming lady by W. Beckwith McInnes is only a pale reflection of vitality

Moore notes Nibbi's observation of Australia artists who were 'studying new problems', and were 'discerning citizens' with genuine appreciation of modern art, but also summarised the way Nibbi's views, decried vehemently by many, had supporters like Rah Fizelle and others including Daryl Lindsay and Arnold Shore who at least conceded that the new art had 'been accepted by the majority', or 'could not be denied.' Protesting the 'incontestable' authority of conventional realism most strongly, Moore wrote, was A.M.E. Bale, whom Cézanne could teach 'nothing about the reality of representation', while Jo Sweatman, regarding modernism was a fad of the times, called for its suppression as an evil.

The Herald gave Nibbi a column of over 1,000 words in its 10 December 1931 issue, in which he responded that the 'moderns', subject to 'intense critical passion of the last 10 years', were no longer a 'vogue' but were 'more than ever the centre of universal interest'. Cézanne, Gauguin, Van Gogh, De Chirico, Utrillo, Derain, Dufy, Segonzac, Braque, Rouault, Gromaire, Kisling and Lurcat, were visionary inheritors of the 'unique intuitions,' 'faithful to their times' of Giotto, El Greco, Tintoretto, and Rembrandt, in their 'painting, for instance, a face, not as we believe we see it, but painting the emotion that gives us that particular face. Avoiding on one hand the platitude of colour photography, and on the other the deceitful reproduction of objects which results in the cold and conventional appearance of a fictitious entity.'

Alessi notes that in 1935 that AArtA member and Herald critic Norman Macgeorge declared "I would like to be a modernist myself". The University holds his collection amongst which is his Cézannesque Nudes in a Glade.

== Bibliography ==
- Joyce McGrath, The Australian Art Association, 1912-1933 (B. Soc. Sci. special study, Royal Melbourne Institute of Technology, 1974)
