= William Dunn Knox =

Australian artist

William Dunn Knox (1880–1945) was an Australian artist.

Knox was born in Adelaide and trained at the National Gallery of Victoria school, Melbourne, under Lindsay Bernard Hall 1917–21. In 1918 he became a member of the Victorian Artists Society, later on the council and in 1919 was elected to the Australian Art Association, later on the council.

Knox's first exhibition was in 1918 at the Australian Art Association, Melbourne.

Gallery that hold his paintings include: the National Gallery of Australia, Canberra; the National Gallery of Victoria, Melbourne, the Art Gallery of South Australia, Adelaide and the Art Gallery of Western Australia, Perth.
