= James Ranalph Jackson =

Australian painter (1882–1975)

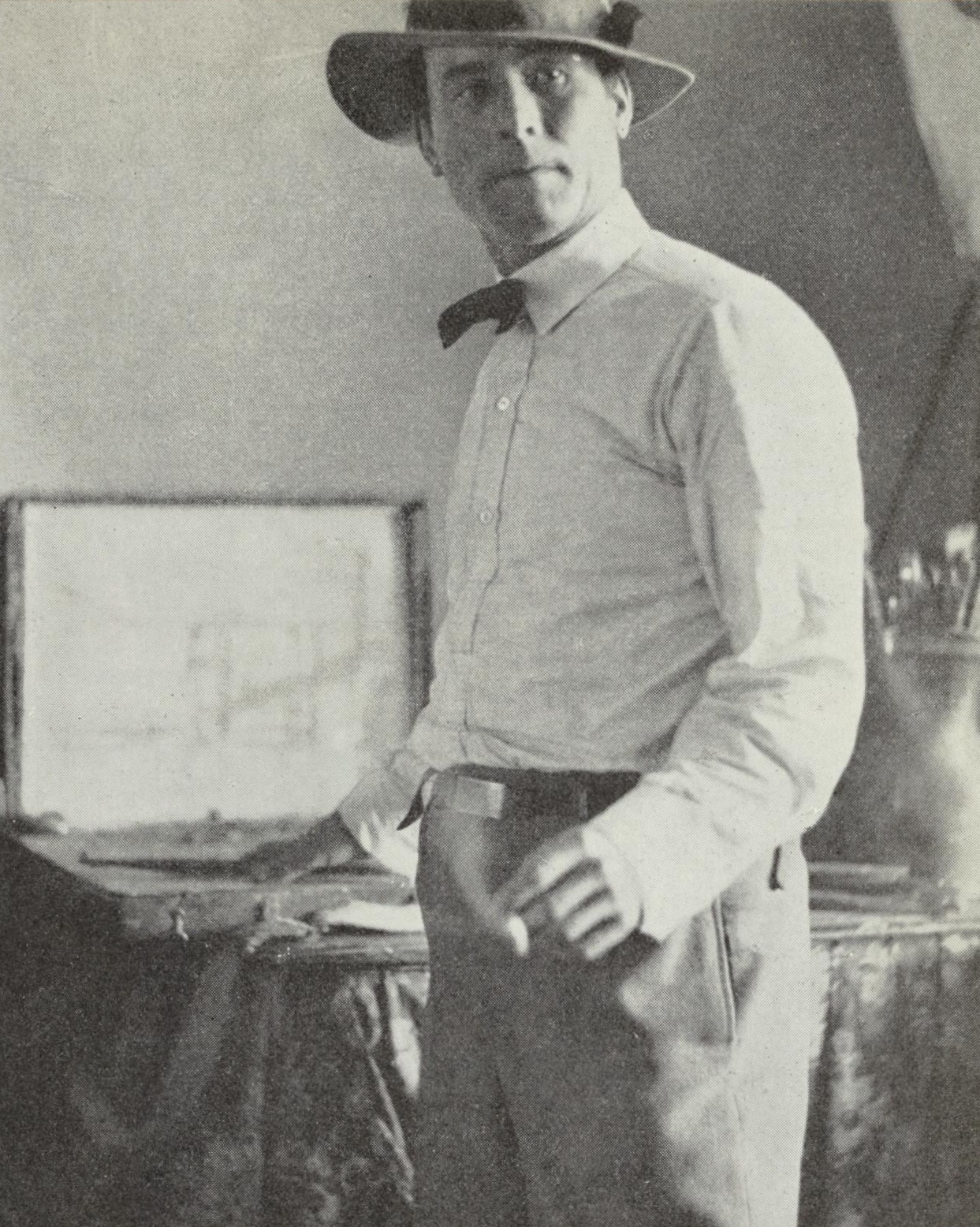
- James Ranalph Jackson, photographed by H. Cazneaux (Australian Home Beautiful, 1 May 1933).
- Born: 3 July 1882; Bunnythorpe, New Zealand
- Died: 9 September 1975 (aged 93); Sydney, Australia
- Education: Royal Art Society of New South Wales
- Notable work: 'Morning in the Studio'
- Style: Impressionism

James Ranalph Jackson (1882–1975) was an Australian painter, perhaps best known for painting views of Sydney Harbour. Today, his work hangs in public galleries in both Australia and New Zealand. The Art Gallery of New South Wales has 16 of his paintings, however none is currently on display.

== Background ==
Jackson was born on 3 July 1882 at Bunnythorpe, some ten km north of Palmerston North, New Zealand. His father was George Albert Jackson and his mother was Mary Ann Julia Leach. George Jackson was a farmer from England and Mary Ann Leach was born in India. They had eleven children, including James. After Mary died in 1890, in 1894 the family moved to Darlinghurst, an eastern suburb of Sydney. Sydney Harbour made such an impression on James that it would remain a major motif in his work for the rest of his life.

James left school at an early age to take up an apprenticeship with a decorator. In the evenings James studied drawing at the Royal Art Society of New South Wales. He also briefly attended J. S. Watkins's art school.

== Study abroad ==
In 1906 he wanted to work with Bernard Hall at the National Gallery schools in Melbourne but did not gain admission. Instead Jackson sailed to London. There (Sir) Frank Brangwyn encouraged Jackson to paint thickly and taught him the basic technology. Jackson next spent a year in the Latin Quarter in Paris, studying at the Académie Colarossi and then touring Europe during the summer. He went as far as Venice, where he painted the Rialto Bridge. In Paris he was exposed to Impressionism before he returned to Australia in 1908.

== Australian career ==
After his return to Sydney, Jackson settled on the North Shore of the harbour. There, at the Art Society, he taught drawing and painting from 1917 to 1926. During this period he had his first solo exhibition and got married. The solo exhibition took place in 1920 at the Gayfield Shaw Art Salon. Four years later, on 10 December 1924, he married Dorathea Elizabeth Toovey, one of his students, who later became a noted artist in her own right.

Public recognition and appreciation of Jackson’s talents came early in his career. In 1914 the Art Gallery of New South Wales purchased Oleanders, the first of many paintings from Jackson to be purchased by the Gallery. His painting Middle Harbour from Manly Heights, 1923, “was purchased through public subscription by the Manly Council and became the first artwork in the Manly Art Gallery and Museum collection.” Regional galleries in Victoria and New South Wales were also quick to recognise and purchase Impressionist works by Jackson.

In December 1926 the couple left Sydney to visit Paris and London, and then travel through the Pyrenees to Spain. They returned to Sydney in spring of 1928.

The Great Depression in the early 1930s crimped the family's income. This forced James and Dora to rent out the house they had built at Seaforth, a suburb of northern Sydney, and to move to the country where the cost of living was lower. Still, by 1936 James had a studio at Mosman.

From 1916 to 1933 Jackson was a member of the Australian Art Association, Melbourne. He was one of the first Fellows (1922) of the Royal Art Society of New South Wales, and he became life vice-president in 1965. In 1937 Jackson helped found the Australian Academy of Art and exhibited there until 1946.

In 1942 Jackson joined the camouflage section of the Department of Defence. He remained there until the authorities discovered his true age and dismissed him for being over-age.

In 1947 he and Dora divorced. At the time, they had two children, a son and a daughter.

After his divorce James lived alone and continued to paint. He finally died in Sydney on 9 September 1975.

In 1991, his daughter Jacqueline, published a biography of her father.

== Art ==
While living on the North Shore, Jackson painted many landscapes and seascapes of Sydney harbour, both in oils and watercolour. An example of this is The Harbour, Neutral Bay, Sydney; a view of Sydney Harbour from Kurraba Point, Neutral Bay, depicting the beginnings of high-rise development in the suburb in the early 20th century. Sydney Harbour and surrounds provided Jackson with many scenes for his canvas and were popular with collectors. A year after his death, Christie's in London auctioned two pictures by J.R. Jackson of Sydney Harbour. “A London dealer paid $1,794 for a painting of Clontarf, and a private buyer paid $1,617 for a painting of old Cremorne.” His early work showed the influence of Impressionism. Then when he lived in the countryside during the Great Depression, he painted landscapes, mostly in oils.

In Jackson's later years he painted rural landscapes in New South Wales, particularly "around Bellingen, painting at Dorrigo and also in the mountains around the upper reaches of the Macleay River." In the mid 1950s Jackson toured and painted in Victoria around Lake Eildon, and the Dandenong ranges.

Continuing interest in the art of James R. Jackson was evident in the 2012-2013 exhibition held at Manly Art Gallery and Museum. With reference to the Gallery, the catalogue for the exhibition refers to "the painting that launched an art gallery." [] Painted by Jackson in 1923, 'Middle Harbour from Manly Heights' was purchased for one hundred pounds. Drawing inspiration from his childhood, Sydney Harbour would provide subject matter for Jackson for over five decades.

== Prizes awarded ==
Jackson exhibited continuously from 1907 until the early 1970s, principally in Sydney, Melbourne, and Brisbane, but also in London and Paris. His landscapes were finalists in the Wynne Prize many times. Below is a list of prizes won by Jackson during his lengthy career.

- 1924 Manly Art Prize with 'Middle Harbour from Manly Heights.'
- 1929 Prize in State Theatre Art Quest with 'Pont Brescon Martigues.'
- 1942 George MacKay Prize with 'Old Road French's Forest.'
- 1960 Prize in Royal Agricultural Society Easter Show, Sydney.
- 1961 Winner of the W.D. & H.O. Wills Art Competition with 'Luna Park'.
- 1962 Manly Art Prize with 'Murray Valley.'
- 1962 Grafton Art Prize with Murray Valley at Jingellic.'

== Gallery holdings ==
National, State, and regional galleries across Australia holds works by Jackson. The National Gallery of Australia hold Morning in the Studio, c1917.

- The Art Gallery of New South Wales holds 16 works, including the landscape The old road, South Coast, 1934.
- The State Library of New South Wales holds three works including Milsons Point, ca. 1960.
- The Art Gallery of South Australia holds one work, After the rehearsal, 1917.
- The National Gallery of Victoria holds four works, including Bridge at Chioggia, Venice, 1907.
- Castlemaine Art Museum (Vic.) holds one work, Reflections, 1916.
- Mosman Art Gallery, Sydney hold four works, including Sydney Harbour, 1965.
- The New England Regional Art Museum holds two works from a trip to Spain in 1907. Spanish Patio, and Passeo Pollenza, Spain.

== Citations and references ==
Citations

References

- Behrens, Roy R. (2009) Camoupedia: a compendium of research on art, architecture and camouflage. (Dysart, Iowa: Bobolink Books). ISBN 978-0-9713244-6-6
- Jackson, Jacqueline (1991) James R. Jackson: art was his life. (Bay Books). ISBN 1863780246
- Pearce, Barry, 'Jackson, James Ranalph (1882–1975)', Australian Dictionary of Biography, National Centre of Biography, Australian National University. - accessed 9 October 2012.
