= Dora Toovey =

Australian painter (1898–1986)

- Dora Toovey in the 1930s
- Born: Dorathea Elizabeth Toovey; 1898; Bathurst, New South Wales, Australia
- Died: 1986 (aged 87–88)
- Other name: Dora Jackson
- Education: Royal Art Society, Sydney (under Antonio Dattilo-Rubbo); James R. Jackson; John Passmore; Académie Julian, Paris
- Known for: Portrait and landscape painting
- Notable work: Lt. A. R. Cutler VC (1943); Self-portrait in a landscape (1970); Portrait of Neville Bonner (1978)
- Spouse(s): James R. Jackson (m. 1924; div. 1947) George Scott
- Children: 2, including Jacqueline Jackson
- Awards: Portia Geach Memorial Award (1970, 1978)

Dora Toovey (born Dorathea Elizabeth Toovey; 1898 – 1986) was an Australian painter known for her portraits and landscapes. A regular exhibitor and finalist at the Archibald Prize, Sulman Prize and Wynne Prize, she won the Portia Geach Memorial Award twice, in 1970 and again in 1978.

== Early life and training ==
Toovey was born in Bathurst, New South Wales, in 1898. She trained in Sydney at the Royal Art Society under Antonio Dattilo-Rubbo, as well as James R. Jackson and John Passmore. In December 1924 she married Jackson, one of her instructors, at St Paul's Anglican Church, Middle Harbour. In December 1926 the couple left Sydney for Europe, where Toovey attended the Académie Julian Paris and spent time studying in the south of France under Augustus John. The couple returned to Sydney in 1928.

== Career ==
Toovey began painting portraits from 1924 and went on to exhibit regularly in Sydney over the following decades. This included a solo exhibition of oil paintings at the Rubery Bennett Galleries in May 1938, featuring Sydney Harbour scenes, a view of Balmoral, and landscapes she had painted in Spain shortly before the Spanish Civil War. She exhibited landscapes and was a multi-finalist in the Wynne Prize and was, according to the National Portrait Gallery, an Archibald Prize finalist thirty-four times without ever winning the prize. She was also a finalist for the Sulman Prize and multi-time finalist for the Portia Geach Memorial Award.

In 1945 she painted a portrait for the Duke of Gloucester, then Governor-General of Australia, which was shown at a Royal Art Society exhibition in Sydney. During the widely publicised 1944 court case over that year's Archibald Prize, Toovey attended proceedings and painted a portrait of barrister Frank Killen KC in court.

Toovey won the Portia Geach Memorial Award, awarded for the best portrait painted from life by a woman artist, in 1970 for a self-portrait in a landscape. She won again in 1978 for a portrait of Senator Neville Bonner, the first Aboriginal member of the Australian Parliament. Her work is held in the collections of the Art Gallery of New South Wales and the National Portrait Gallery.

== Personal life ==
Toovey and Jackson had two children, a daughter, Jacqueline, and a son, Murray. The couple divorced in 1947 and Toovey married George Scott by 1952. She continued to paint and exhibit under her maiden name. She was a long-term resident of Mosman, a suburb on Sydney's North Shore.

Toovey died in 1986.
