= Nasturtium =

Nasturtium may refer to:

- Tropaeolum, a plant genus in the family Tropaeolaceae, commonly known as nasturtium
- Nasturtium (plant genus), a plant genus in the family Brassicaceae, which includes watercress
- Nasturtiums (E. Phillips Fox) a 1912 painting by E. Phillips Fox
- Nasturtiums, a 1903 painting by Tudor St. George Tucker
- Nasturtium (horse) (1899–1916), an American Champion Thoroughbred racehorse
- Senecio tropaeolifolius, a succulent plant that is known as "false nasturtium"
