= Edith Susan Boyd =

Australian artist, writer (1880–1961)

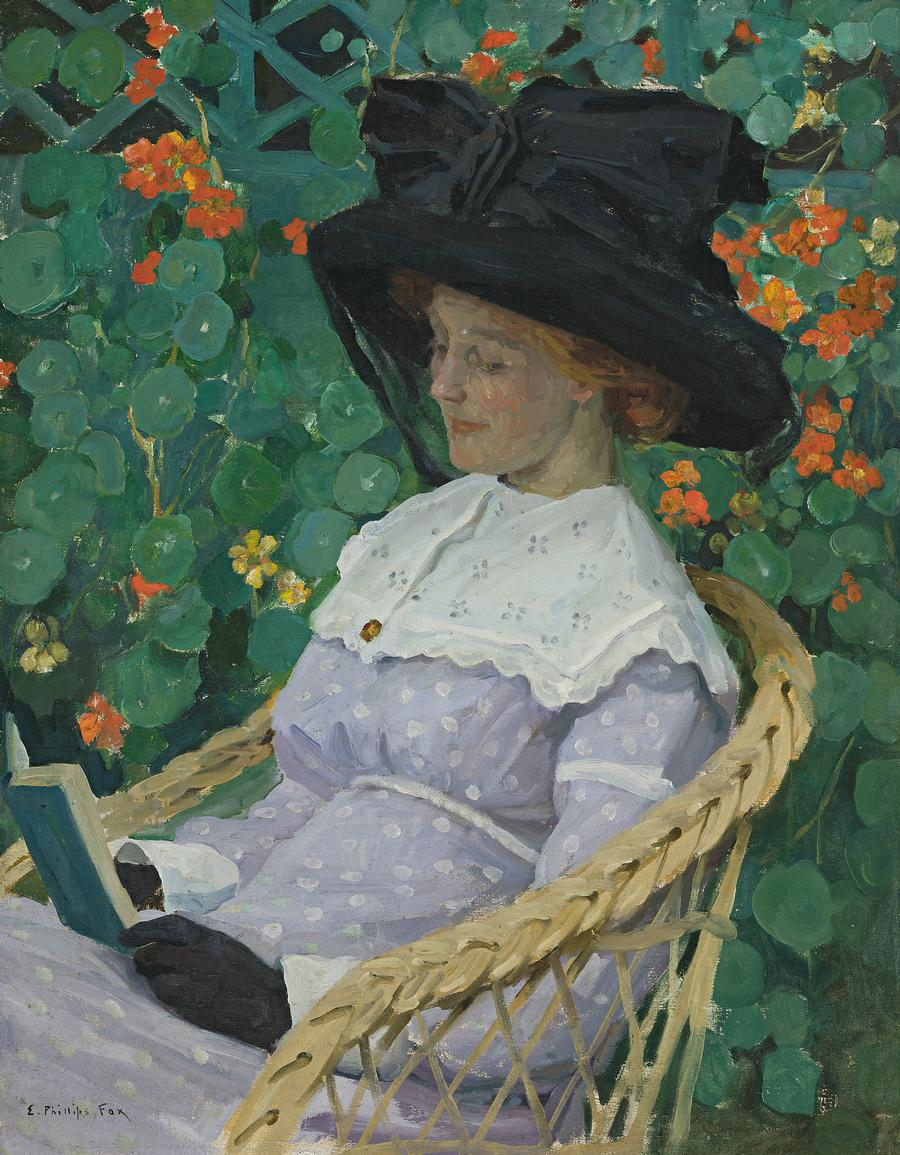
- Nasturtiums, by Emmanuel Phillips Fox, featuring Edith Susan Gerard Anderson (1912)
- Born: Edith Susan Gerard Anderson; 16 February 1880; Brisbane, Queensland, Australia
- Died: 31 March 1961 (aged 81); East Burwood, Victoria, Australia
- Education: Slade School (London)
- Occupations: painter, dramatist, drawer, model
- Notable work: Mary had a little lamb, Mimi, Illustration, The song of the morrow, Water colours, Blue mountains, Margaret, Portrait, Sunlight, A highlander
- Style: Impressionist
- Spouse: Theodore Penleigh Boyd (15 October 1912 – 27 November 1923)
- Children: 3

Edith Susan Gerard Anderson (16 February 1880 – 31 March 1961), who became Edith Susan Boyd when she married, was an Australian artist, dramatist, and painter. She was also known for being a model for the artist Emanuel Phillips Fox, notably in his 1912 painting Nasturtiums.

== Early life and family ==
Edith Susan Gerard Anderson was born on 16 February 1880 in Brisbane, Queensland. The name "Edith" came from her mother and the name "Gerard" from a Scottish grandmother.

She was the youngest child in her family. She was the daughter of John Gerard Anderson, the head of the Department of Public Instruction, and Edith Sarah Wood. Her brother Arthur was a prominent doctor, and her eldest sister Maud was one of the first women to graduate with a Bachelor of Arts degree at the University of Sydney, making her possibly Queensland's first female university graduate. Maud subsequently married John Ashton, who became Bishop of Grafton. Their grandfather was Reverend James Anderson.

== Mid-life and marriage ==
=== Life in Paris ===
Anderson lived with the artist Emanuel Phillips Fox and his wife, Ethel Carrick, here Anderson modeling for Fox at their Paris studio-home in the Cité fleurie, 65 Boulevard Arago, nestled a little way south of the Luxembourg Gardens. He gave her painting lessons based on the impressionistic style that he learned when he attended the National Gallery School in Melbourne from 1878 until 1886 under G. F. Folingsby. Fox also helped set up her garden at her apartment.

Anderson met her husband, Australian painter Theodore Penleigh Boyd, during this trip to Paris. Fox introduced Boyd and Anderson when Boyd worked in a studio next door to Fox's.

Boyd described Anderson as "intelligent as well as beautiful…it was in nearly every way a perfect match." They married in Paris on 15 October 1912; at their wedding, she was given away by Fox because of the close friendship the couple had with the painter. Notable guests at the Anderson-Boyd wedding include Rupert Bunny and Bessie Gibson. Following the marriage, Edith Susan Gerard Anderson changed her name to Edith Susan Boyd.

=== Life in Australia and life after Anderson's wedding ===
In 1912 following their wedding, Anderson and Boyd took their honeymoon to Chartres, Mentone, Rome, Florence, and Venice. In 1913, the couple then returned to Melbourne, Australia where their first child, Pamela Boyd, was born but died two weeks later.

In 1914, the couple moved to Warrandyte, where Penleigh Boyd built the couple a home studio, known as The Robins for Anderson and the children. Anderson gave birth to her second child John Beckett Boyd (1915–1980), most commonly known as Pat Boyd, in 1915.

In 1917, following the birth of Pat Boyd, Penleigh Boyd enlisted in the First Australian Imperial Force, so Anderson was left without him for several months. However, while Boyd was enlisted in the army, he allowed three-fifths of his pay for the support of Anderson and their children.

Anderson had to assist Boyd following his return from war because he was gassed in Ypres in 1917 and was left with lasting physical problems. Anderson reunited with her husband after he was sent to England and then later repatriated to Australia in March 1918.

=== Decline of Anderson's marriage ===
On 3 January 1919, Anderson had her second son Robin Boyd (1919–1971) at Armadale, Melbourne. Robin Boyd became an influential Australian architect, writer, teacher, and social commentator.

In 1922, Anderson and her family sold "The Robins" and moved to Sydney, Australia. Here Penleigh Boyd was hired by Sydney Ure Smith as one of the organizers of a major exhibition of contemporary European art. Because of this opportunity, Anderson and her family moved to England to select paintings for this exhibition, but Penleigh Boyd returned to Australia without Anderson in June 1923 because their marriage was tumultuous during this time.

During this separation, Boyd cheated on Anderson by having a brief affair with a Melbourne socialite Minna Schuler, who was the daughter of the editor of The Age.

Before Anderson and her children returned to Australia, Penleigh Boyd bought back "The Robins" and purchased a new Hudson car in Sydney in 1923. Anderson met Boyd at Port Melbourne when the returned on 24 November 1923; however, the couple began to argue immediately. On 28 November 1923, Anderson husband's died when he crashed his car near Warragul when he was speeding between Melbourne and Sydney. Anderson buried her husband at Brighton Cemetery in Victoria.

=== Following the death of Anderson's husband ===
Following her husband's death, she was left with money from his estate (including the profit from the sale of "The Robins", the repaired car, and 40 paintings), a small inheritance from her father, and an annual allowance from Penleigh's father, which allowed her to support her sons without the need to work, even during the Great Depression. However, she continued to write dramas and radio plays because of her interest in these topics. Following the sale of "The Robins, Anderson moved to one of Malvern East's oldest apartment blocks at Toorak. She then bought a brick bungalow in Malvern East in 1927. Interactions with members of her past husband Penleigh's family to a degree continued and David Boyd, now deceased, son of Doris and Merric Boyd, gives description to some of these in his 2012 memoir, An Open House: Recollections of My Early Life.

== Career ==
=== Modeling career ===
Edith Susan Gerard Anderson attended the Slade School in London in 1905 and also lived in Paris, modeling for the artist Emanuel Phillips Fox. As a model, she was known for her bright red hair that is a focus of many of Fox's works. Fox was attracted to Anderson as a model "by her rich auburn hair and grey-green eyes—both fashionable at the time." Pictures of her have been described as "full of tender sympathy for the model." Many of the paintings that Anderson modeled for were painted in-situ in the small central courtyard located in the Fox studio-apartment on Boulevard Arago in Montparnasse. She appeared in up to seven possible paintings by this artist in 1912, including The green parasol, On the balcony, Nasturtiums, and Mrs. Penleigh Boyd. She also possibly appeared in The bathing hour in 1909.

==== Nasturtiums ====
Nasturtiums is the most well-known piece of artwork that Edith Susan Gerard Anderson modeled for, possibly as early as September 1912. This painting depicts Anderson wearing a printed mauve dress, black hat and gloves, reading in a garden sitting in a cane chair against a background of nasturtium leaves and flowers going up a trellis. She modeled for this piece in 1912 in Paris for Emanuel Phillips Fox, shortly after he was elected a member of the International Society of Painters and after returning from spending time painting in Spain and Algeria. This painting of Anderson was created with the context of Parisian domesticity, due to Anderson's lifestyle, during the period known as the Belle Époque.

=== Edith Susan Gerard Anderson as an artist ===
After she married into the Boyd family Anderson continued her individual career in painting and drawing. She had previously exhibited a significant number of paintings in the 1910 Royal Queensland Art Society Exhibition.

==== Works ====
Notable works of Edith Susan Gerard Anderson include:

- Mary had a little lamb
- Mimi
- The song of the morrow
- Water colors
- Blue mountains
- Margaret
- Portrait
- Sunlight
- Highlander

== Later life and death ==
In her later life, Anderson wrote several dramas that were staged by repertory companies, one being Three Roses, played by the Little Theatre in 1940, as well as radio plays for the Australian Broadcasting Commission.

She died in East Burwood, Australia on 31 March 1961. Three of Emmanuel Phillips Fox's portraits of Anderson are held by her family. However, Nasturtiums was re-purchased in 2011 at an auction by the Society of the Art Gallery of New South Wales, serving as a memorial to Margaret Olley, who was a Sydney painter and a patron of the gallery who died a few months earlier.

== See also ==
- Marjorie Acker Phillips
- Australian art
- Caroline Bardua
- Hannah Cohoon
- Mary Gartside
- Henrietta Hamilton
- Maria Margaretha van Os
- María Tomasa Palafox, Duchess of Medine Sidonia
- Suzanne Valadon

== Gallery ==
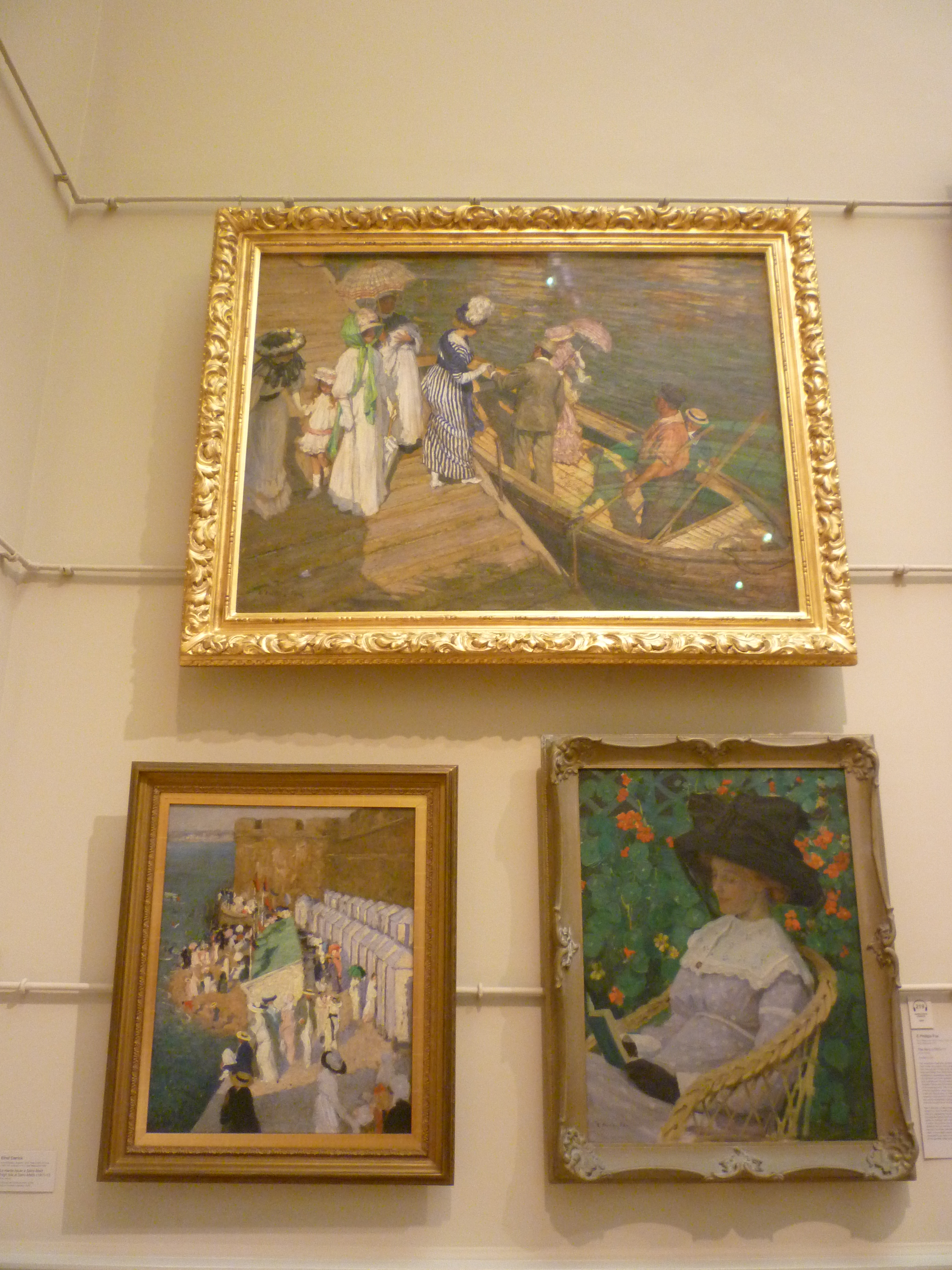
E. Phillips Fox' Nasturtiums hung in AGNSW

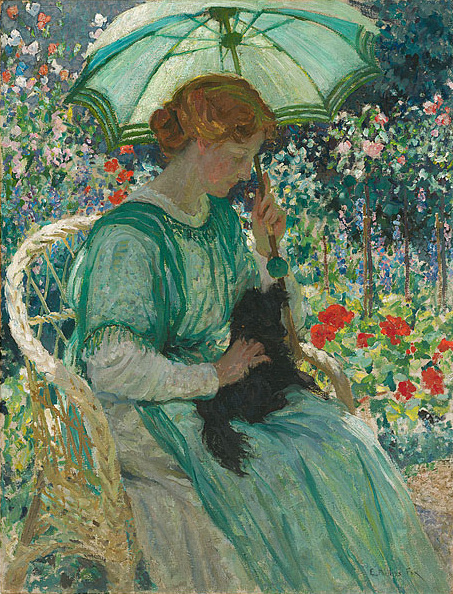
The Green Parasol by E. Phillips Fox, featuring Edith Susan Gerard Anderson as the model

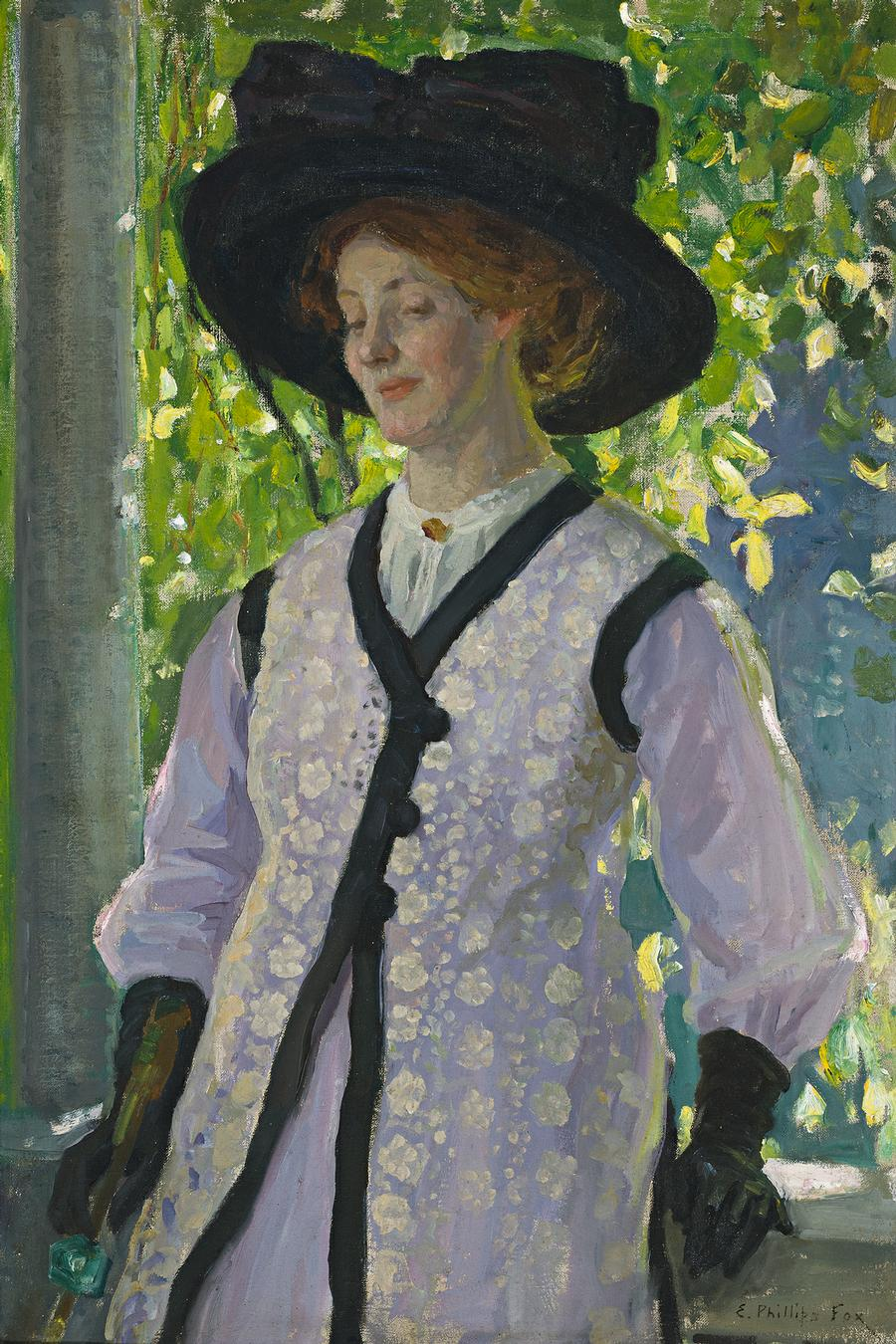
On the Balcony by E. Phillips Fox, featuring Edith Susan Gerard Anderson as the model

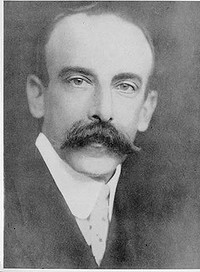
E. Phillips Fox, painter that frequently painted Edith Susan Gerard Anderson

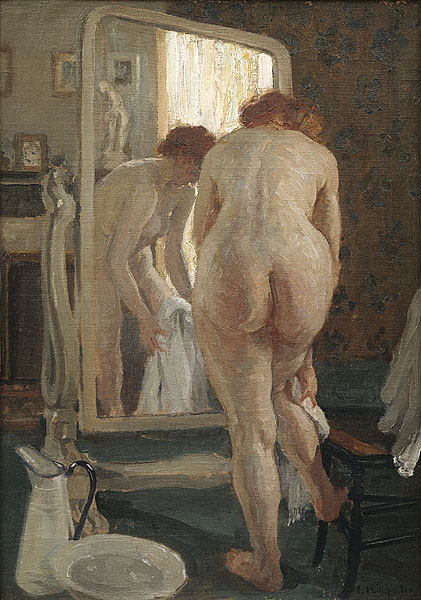
After the Bath by E. Phillips Fox, featuring Edith Susan Gerard Anderson as the model

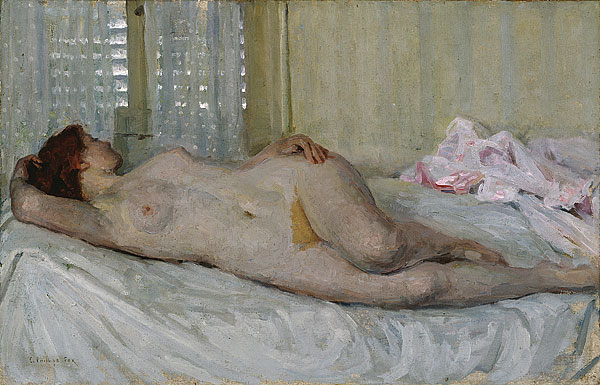
Etude de nu by E. Phillips Fox, featuring Edith Susan Gerard Anderson as the model

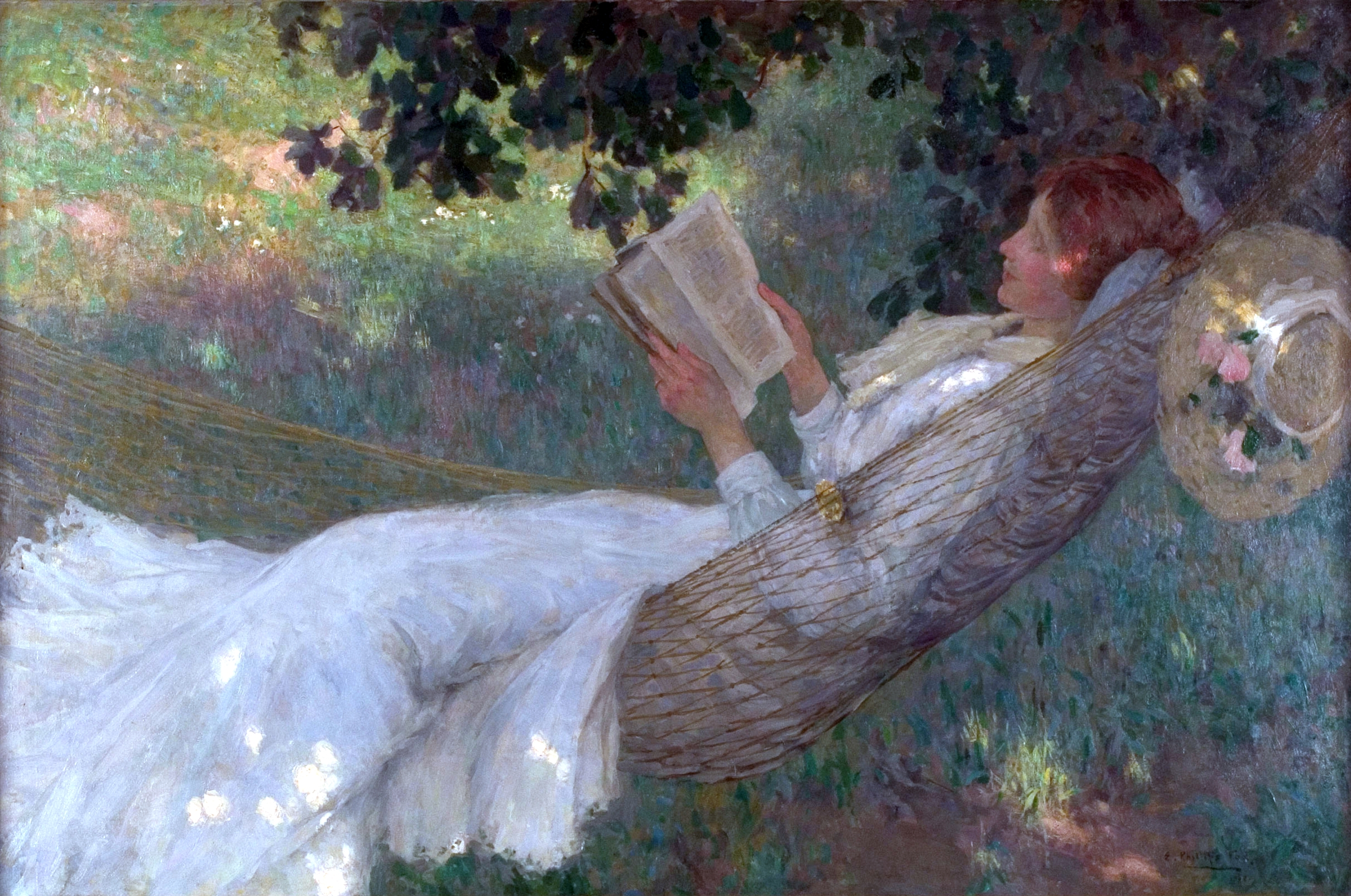
A Love Story by E. Phillips Fox, featuring Edith Susan Gerard Anderson (1903)

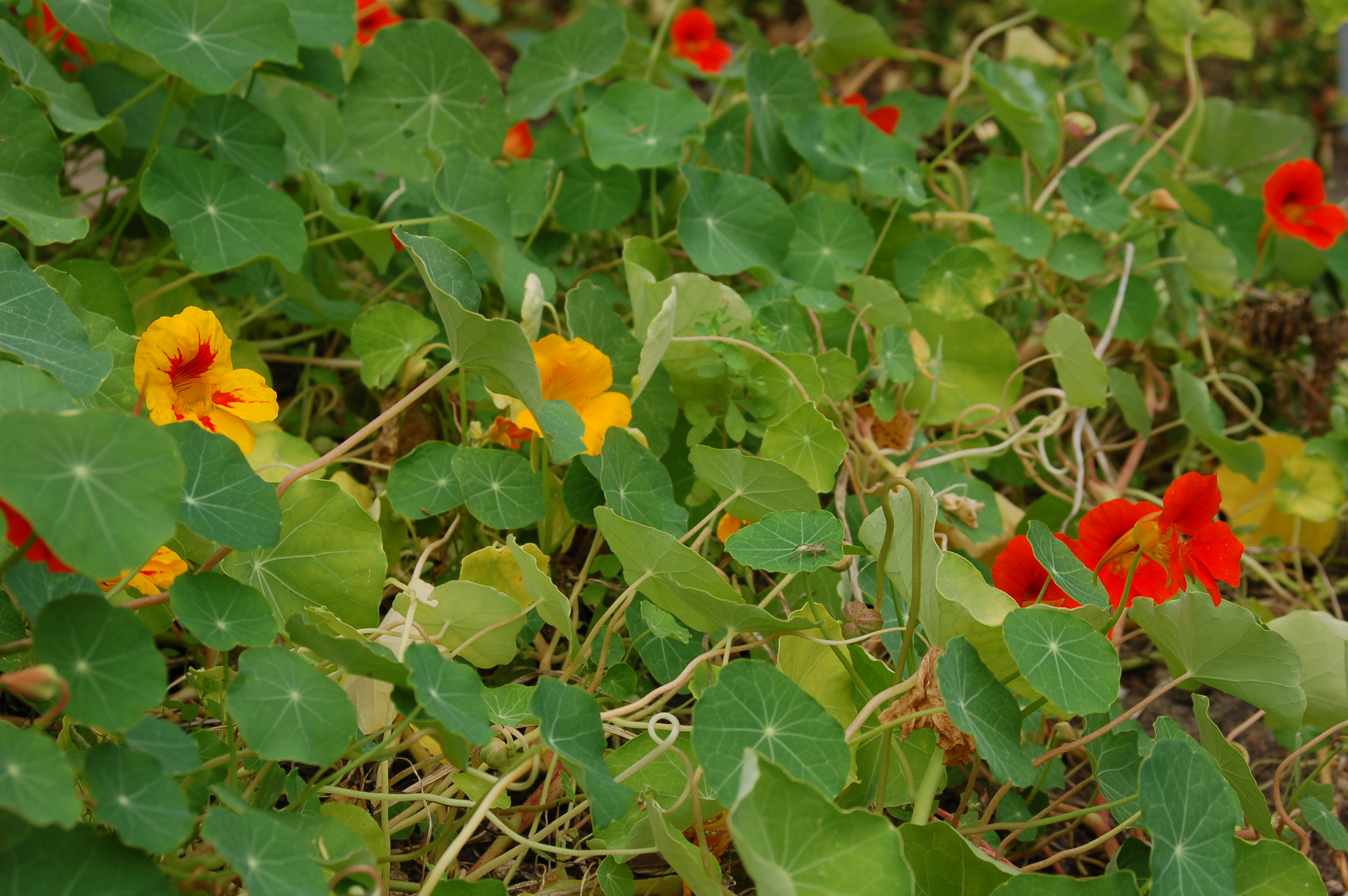
Nasturtium flowers and their leaves, which feature behind the model in the painting Nasturtiums
