= E. Phillips Fox =

Australian painter

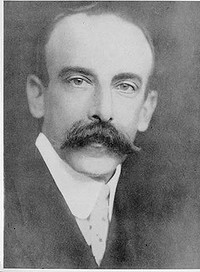
- Born: 12 March 1865; Melbourne, Victoria, Australia
- Died: 8 October 1915 (aged 50); Melbourne, Victoria, Australia
- Other name: Emanuel Phillips Fox
- Known for: Painting
- Spouse: Ethel Carrick (m. 1905)

Emanuel Phillips Fox (12 March 1865 – 8 October 1915) was an Australian impressionist painter.

Born and raised in Melbourne, Victoria, Fox studied at the National Gallery of Victoria Art School. He travelled to Paris to study in 1886 and remained in Europe until 1892, when he returned to Melbourne and led what is considered the second phase of the Heidelberg School, an impressionist art movement which had developed in the city during his absence. He spent over a decade in Europe in the early 20th century before finally settling in Melbourne, where he died.

Fox's wife Ethel Carrick was also a noted impressionist painter.

== Education ==
Emanuel Phillips Fox was born on 12 March 1865 to the photographer Alexander Fox and Rosetta Phillips at 12 Victoria Parade in Fitzroy, Melbourne, into a family of lawyers whose firm, DLA Piper still exists. He studied art at the National Gallery of Victoria Art School in Melbourne from 1878 until 1886 under George Folingsby; his fellow students included John Longstaff, Frederick McCubbin, and David Davies, who like him, joined the bohemian Buonarotti Club, and Rupert Bunny.

In 1886, he travelled to Paris and enrolled at the Académie Julian under William-Adolphe Bouguereau, and École des Beaux-Arts (1887–1890), where his masters included Jean-Léon Gérôme, who with Bouguereau was among the most famous artists of the time. While at the Beaux Arts, he won a first prize. He was greatly influenced by the fashionable school of en plein air Impressionism. He exhibited at the Paris Salon in 1890, and returned to Melbourne the same year.

== Australia ==
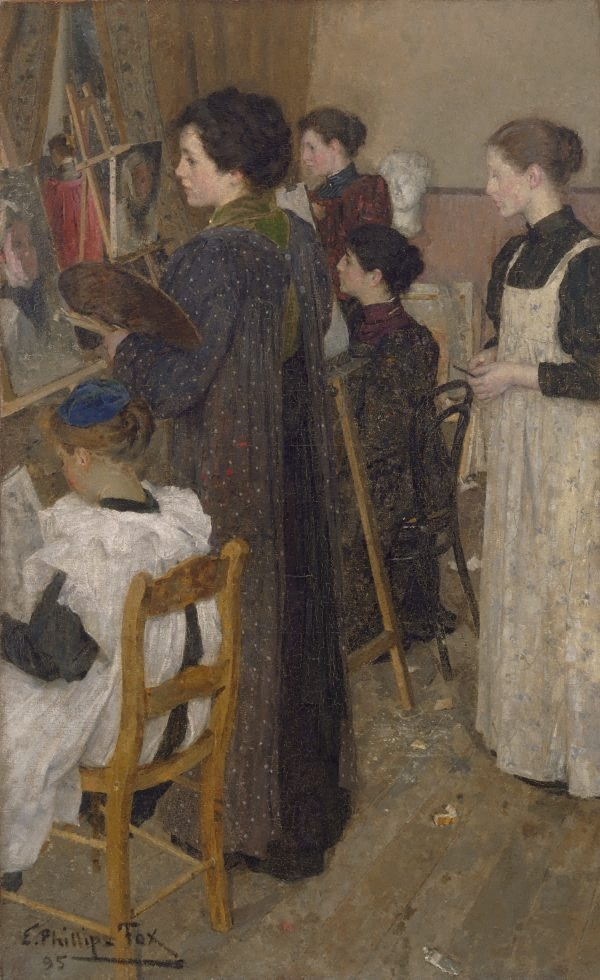
Art Students, 1895

Fox was an influential teacher of Australian artists. In October 1892, Fox opened the Melbourne School of Art with Tudor St. George Tucker, which ran until 1899, and in which the two artists taught Impressionism in the manner of the French schools in which both had studied, and with more liberal methods than the academy-style instruction of the National Gallery of Victoria art schools. A summer school was offered at Charterisville that Fox and Tucker had established in the old mansion above the Yarra River in East Ivanhoe, the lease of which they had taken over from Walter Withers in 1893. It was Australia's first recognised summer school of art. Its women students, including Ina Gregory, Mary Meyer, Bertha Merfield, Henrietta Irving, Ursula Foster and Helen Peters were accommodated in rooms of the stone house and a chaperon and housekeeper looked after them. Violet Teague may have been their tutor. His student Mary Meyer was the subject Fox's portrait of her at age twenty, in the course of which Fox made a finished charcoal drawing. His Whistleresque Portrait of Mary, Daughter of Professor Nanson was exhibited in 1898 at an exhibition of Australian Art in London, at the Grafton Galleries, and is now held in the National Gallery of Victoria. Her husband, Felix Meyer, was Fox's patron. Another student, Ursula Foster, was the model for his model for Fox's Lady in Black and A Love Story.

In his brief career with the Heidelberg School, Fox was noted for his figure compositions and subdued landscapes, often painted as nocturnes, utilising a low-key palette in which the colours, although limited in range, were related to each other "with the utmost delicacy and inventiveness," to quote Australian artist and art scholar James Gleeson. The emphasis on landscapes may have been at least partly a response to market demand – landscapes found more ready acceptance, and Art Students, a figurative genre painting now recognised as one of his best, first exhibited at the Victorian Artists Society in 1895, remained unsold until 1943.

== Europe ==
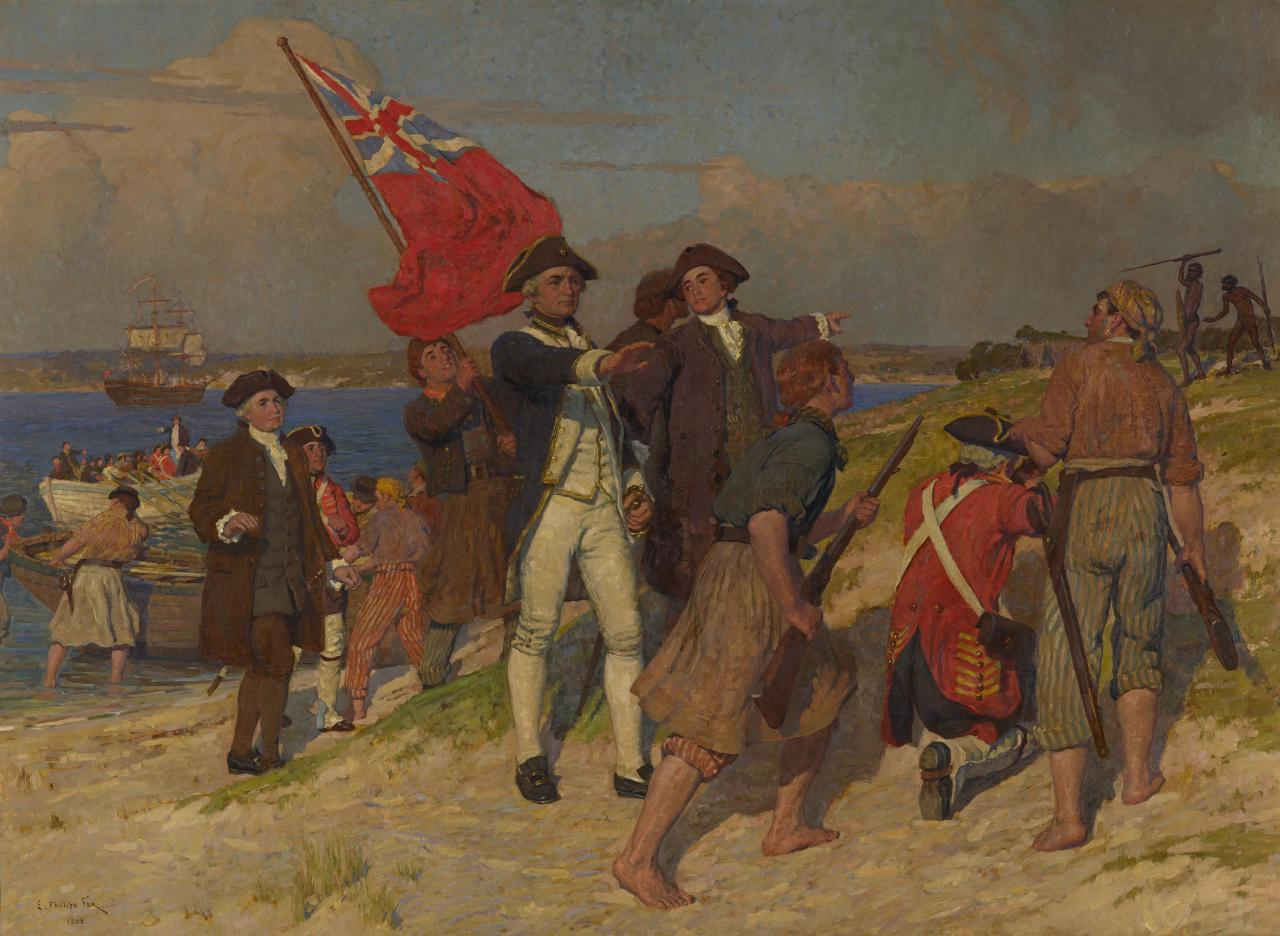
The Landing of Captain Cook at Botany Bay, 1770, 1902

He explained his decision to base himself in the European art world in a 1903 letter to Frederick McCubbin: "I am quite certain that the only way is to exhibit alongside the best of the work here, and that one man shows, and colonial or Australian exhibitions in London are of very little good." Both the Royal Academy and the Salon were bastions of establishment art, remote from the modernism of Braque, Picasso and the School of Paris, and Fox's biographer, art historian Ruth Zubans, describes the Salon as celebrating elegance and femininity "...filtered through Impressionist experience and academic training".

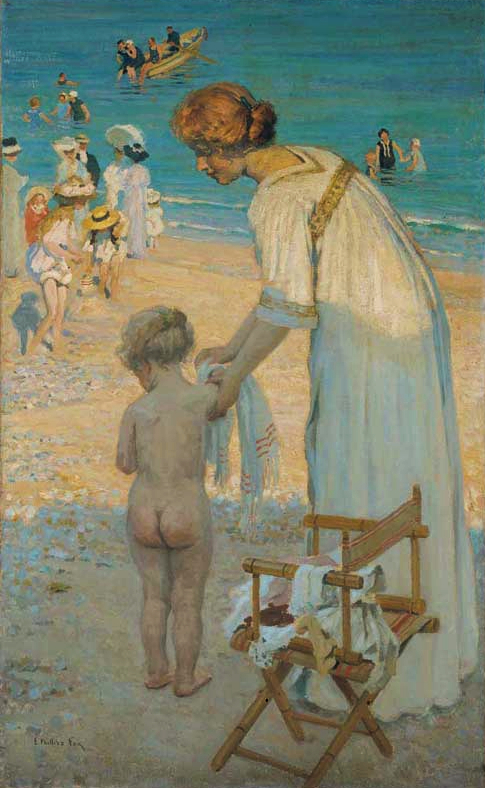
Bathing Hour, 1909, Queensland Art Gallery QAGOMA

Fox enjoyed considerable success in Paris and London, becoming in 1894 the first Australian to be awarded a third-class gold medal at the Salon for Portrait of my Cousin (now in the National Gallery of Victoria).

On 9 May 1905, he married the artist Ethel Carrick in St Peter's Church, Ealing. They toured Italy and Spain, then in 1908 settled in Paris.

== Return to Australia ==
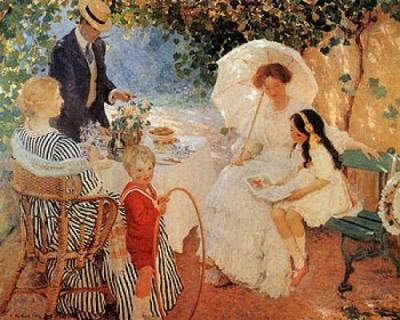
The Arbour, 1910

In 1913, he returned to Australia, marking the occasion with an exhibition of some seventy works. Edith Susan Boyd was one of the main models featured throughout this collection of works. The show was reported with enthusiasm in the local press, the Melbourne Argus writing: "With light and atmosphere always the ruling motive, there is revealed in his themes something of the infinite beauty discoverable in everyday things..." The writer might have had in mind this charming and typical work titled The Arbour.

Fox's official commissions form a final notable aspect of his oeuvre. The Landing of Captain Cook at Botany Bay, the most important of these works, shows clear influence of his teacher Gérôme. Fox also made a copy of Nathaniel Dance's Portrait of Captain Cook, an icon so familiar in Australia that it has become part of the national visual memory.

== Death ==
Fox died of cancer in a Fitzroy hospital on 8 October 1915, aged 50. His wife survived him by 36 years, but there were no children. His nephew Leonard Phillips Fox was a prolific writer and pamphleteer for Communist and humanitarian causes.

== Critical assessment ==
When compared with Charles Conder and Sir Arthur Streeton, Fox shows more fascination with the "effects of dappled light" than to the "sunny vistas" one finds in the other two painters' Heidelberg paintings. He is described as an artist who "remained committed to a late nineteenth century aesthetic that paid homage to Impressionism while retaining the tonal values of academic realism".

== Gallery of paintings ==
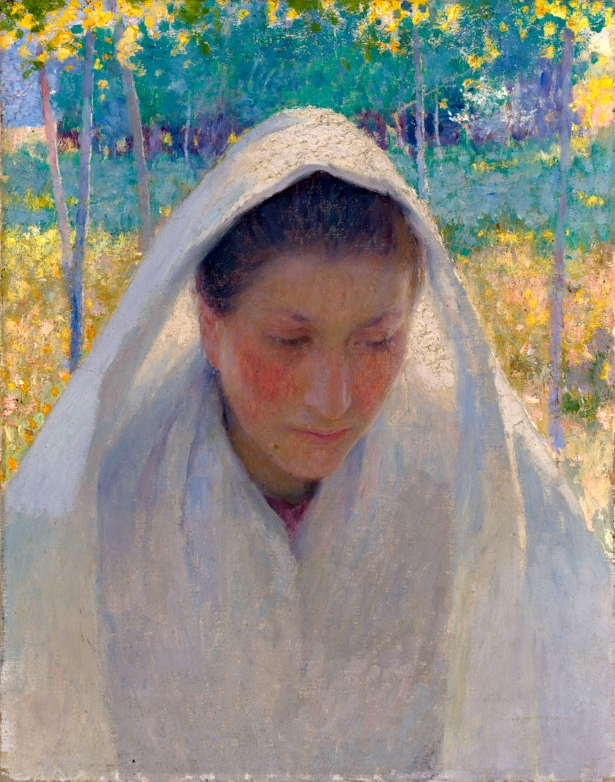
Sunlight Effect, c. 1889

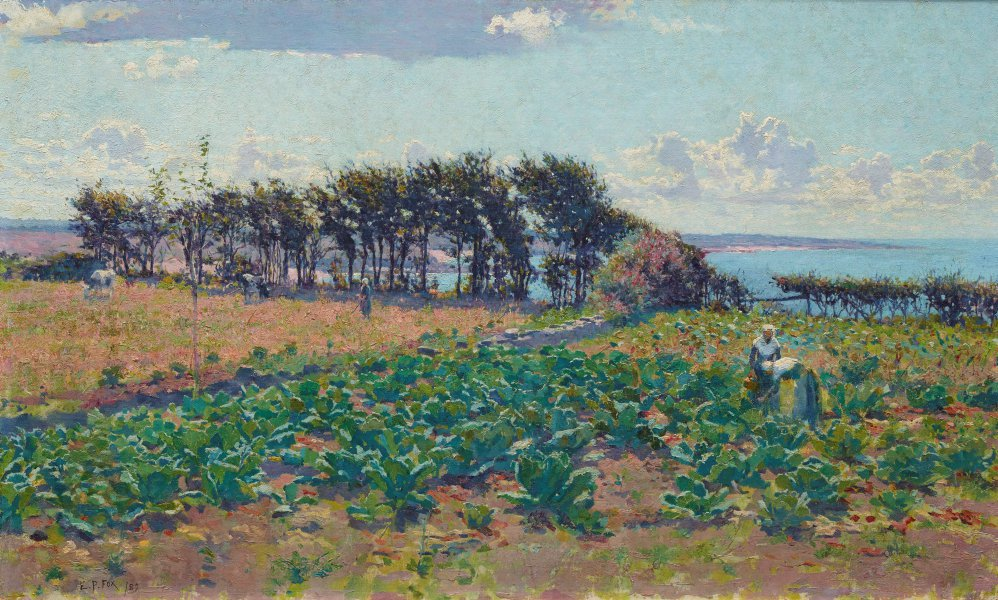
The Cabbage Patch, 1889

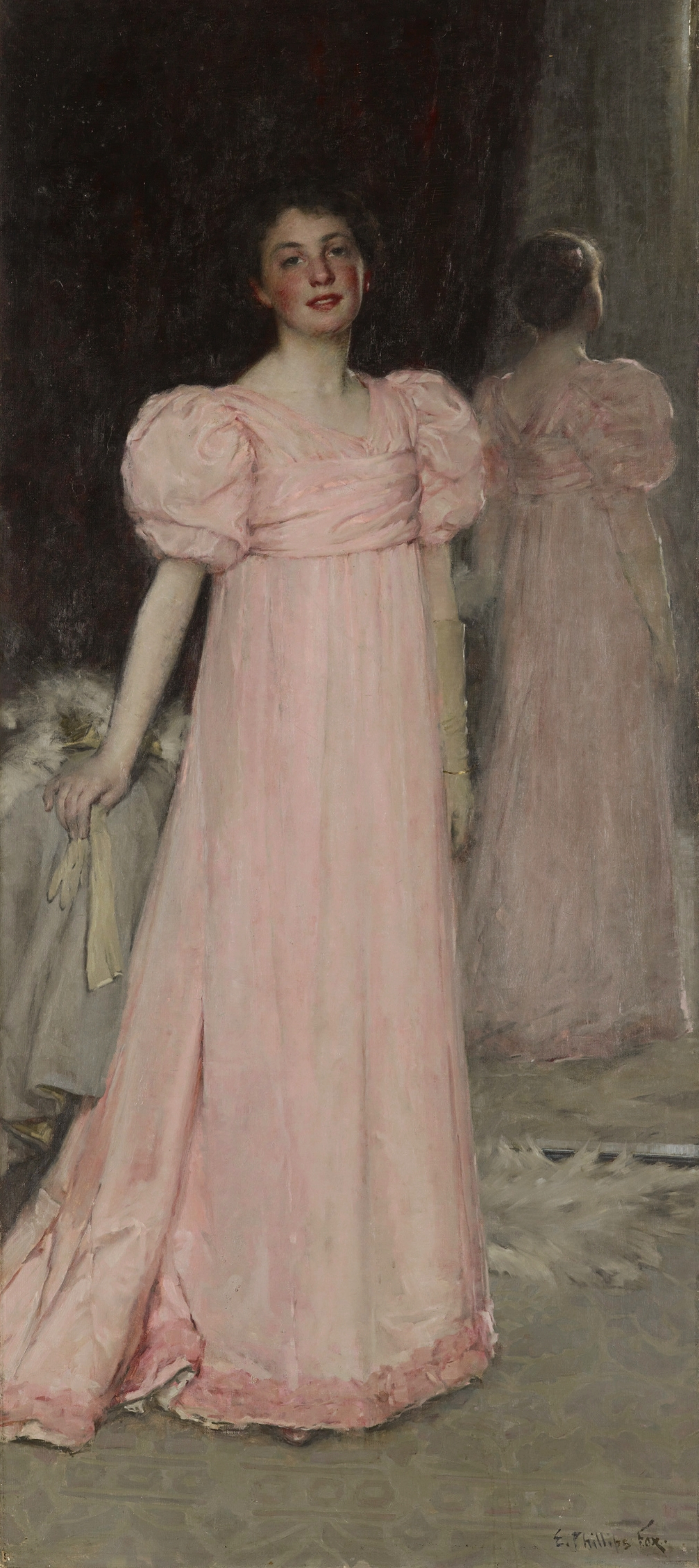
Portrait of my Cousin, 1893

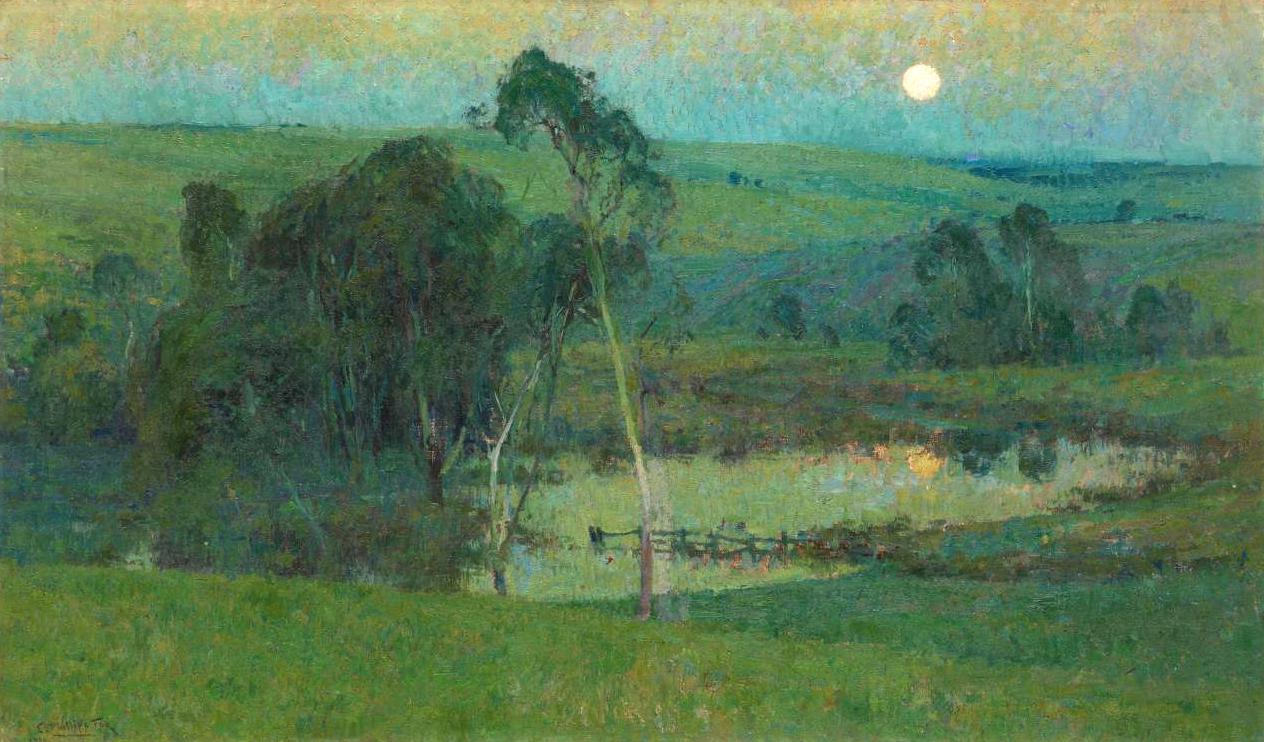
Heidelberg, 1900

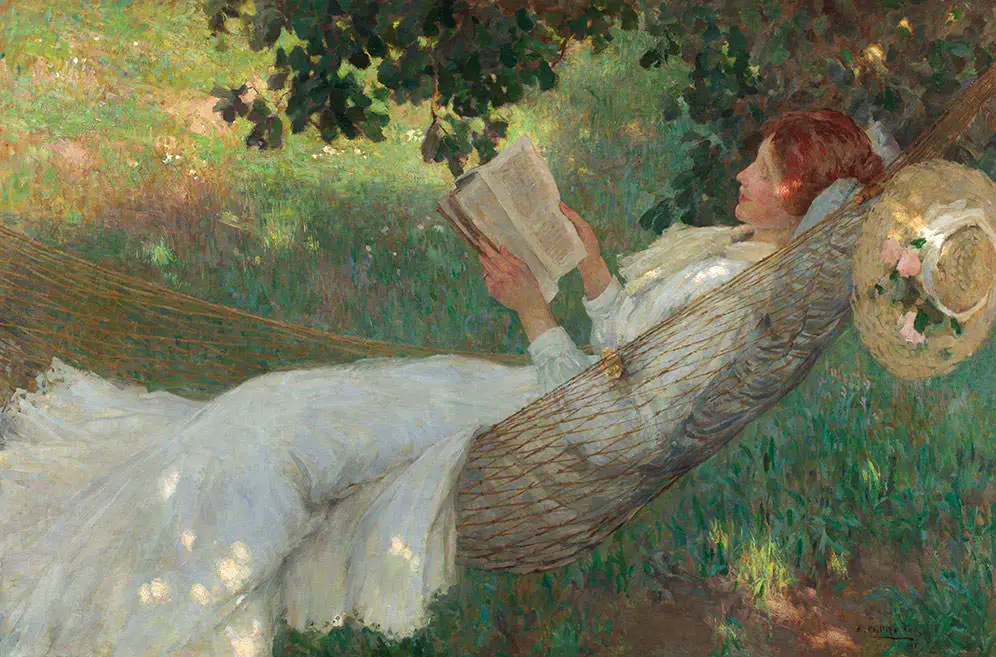
A Love Story, 1903

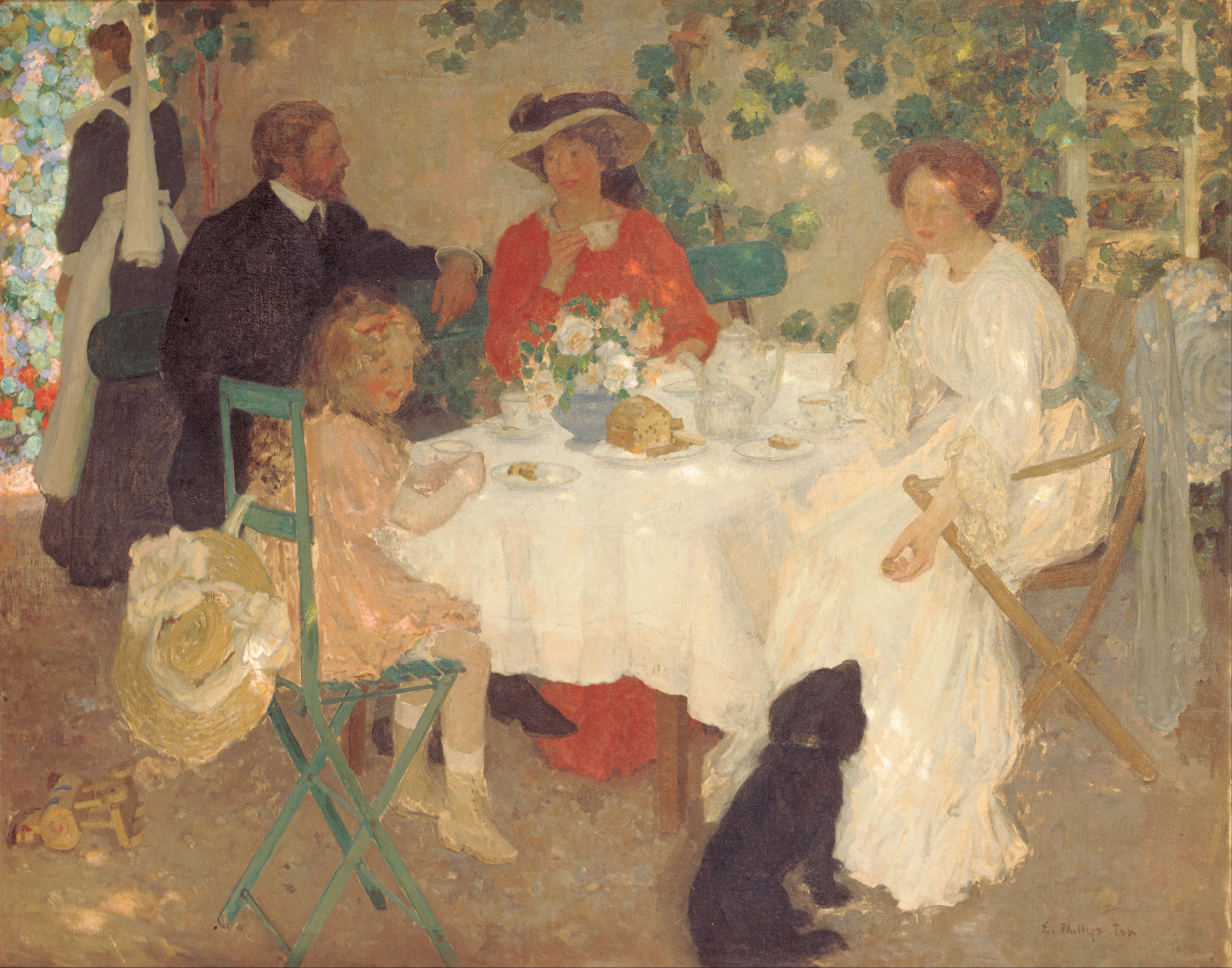
Al Fresco, 1904

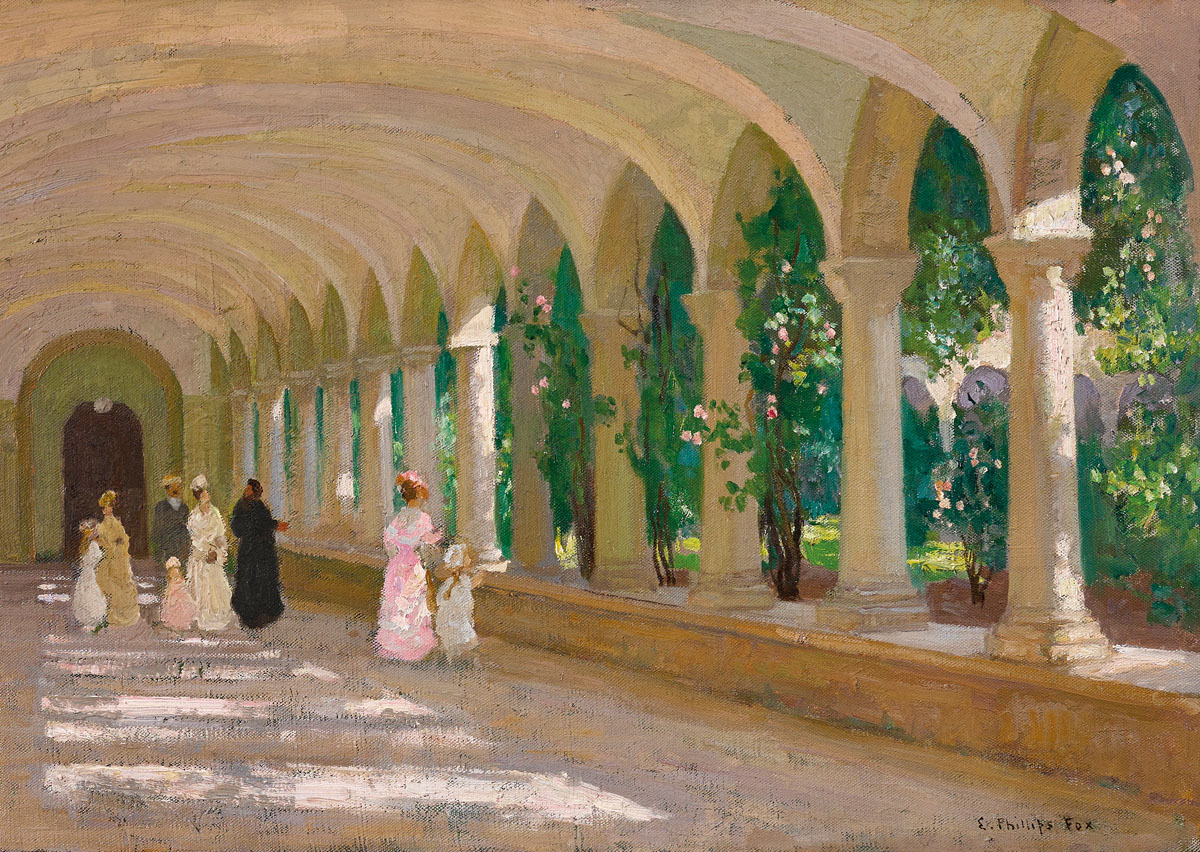
Monastery, San Lazzaro, 1907

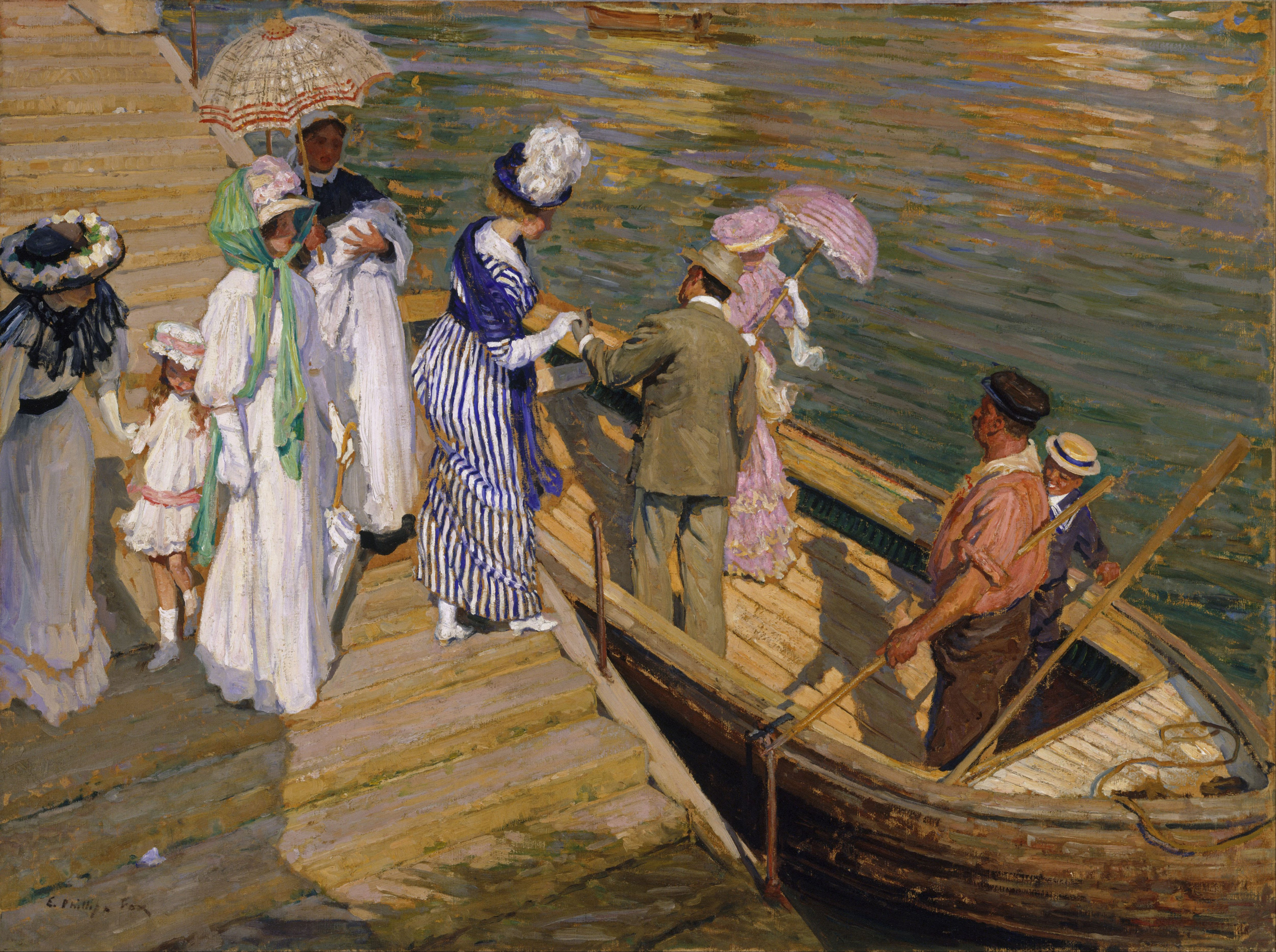
The Ferry, 1911

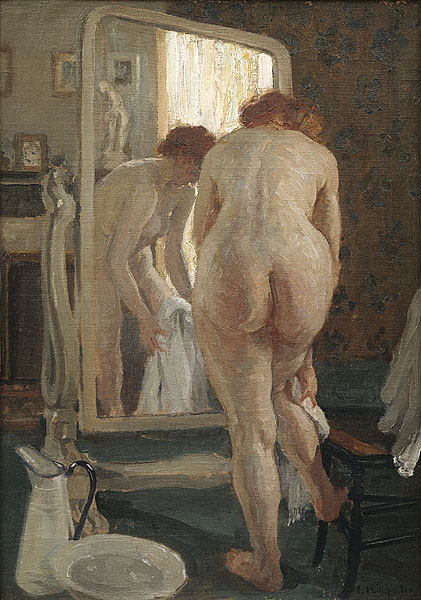
After the Bath, 1911

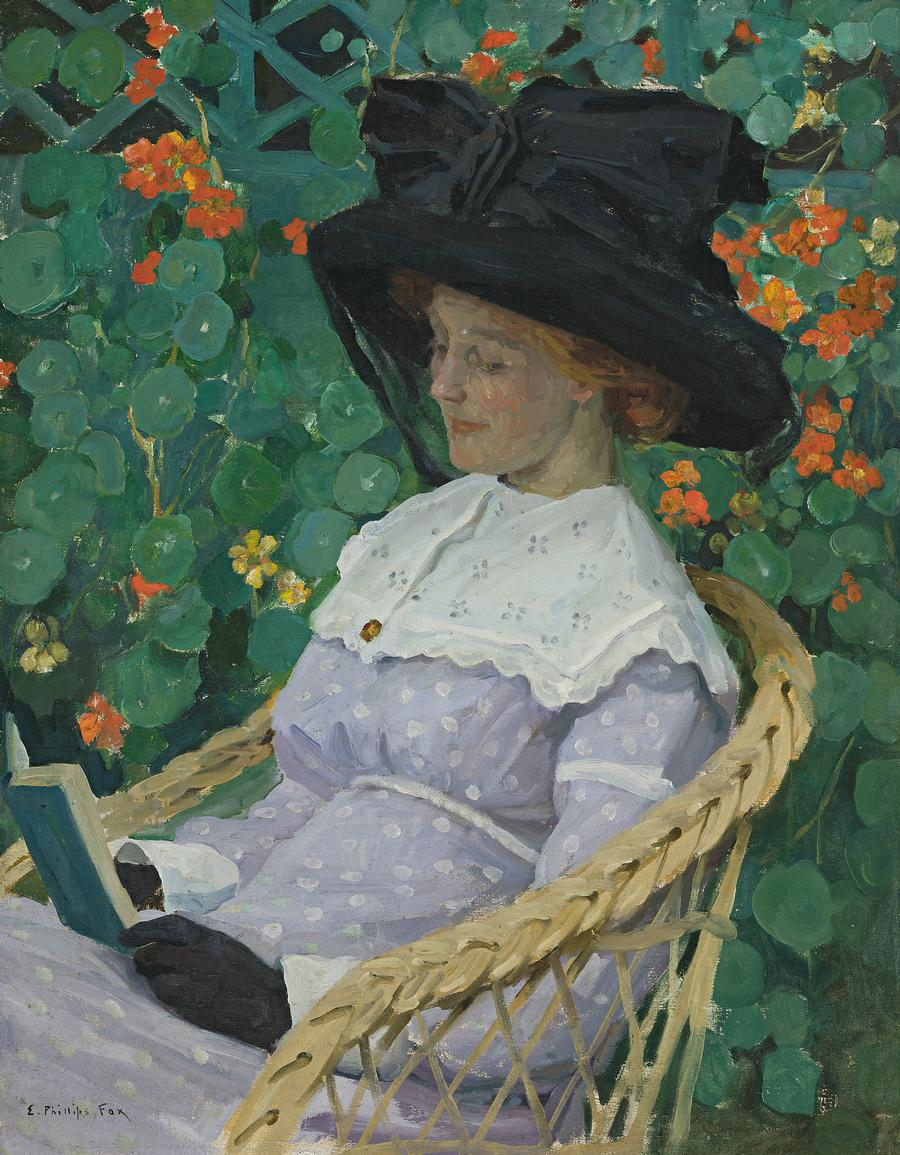
Nasturtiums, 1912

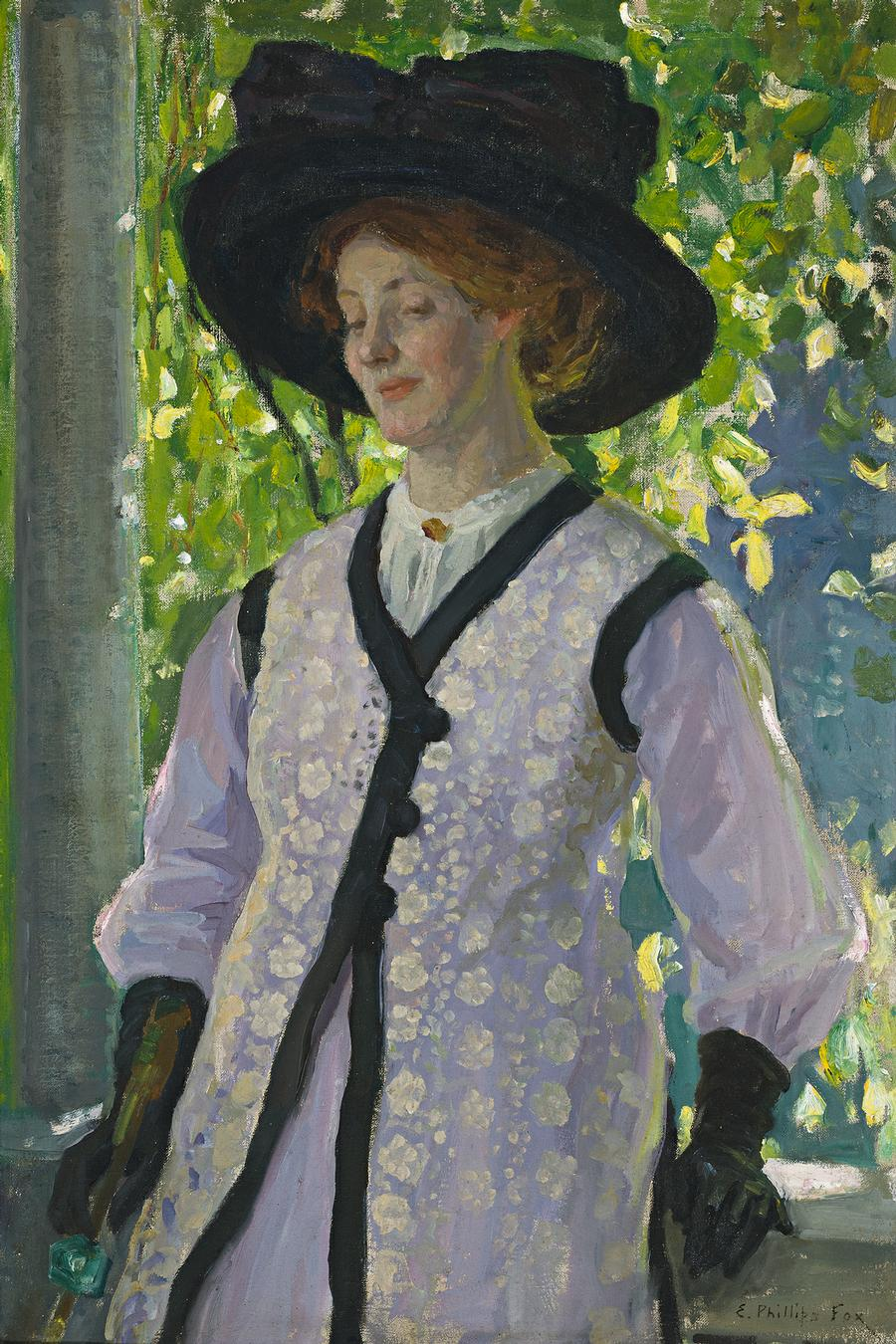
On the Balcony, 1912

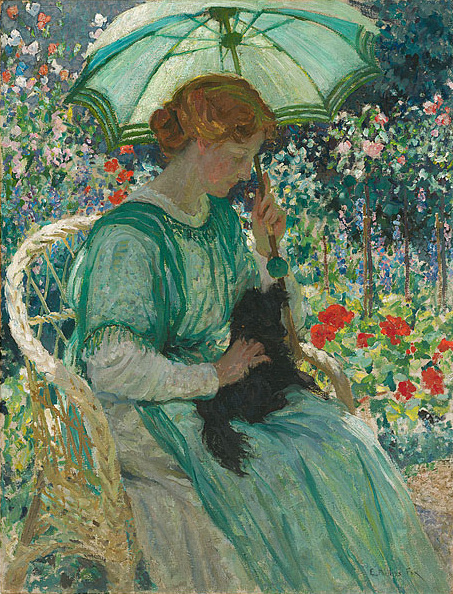
The Green Parasol, 1912

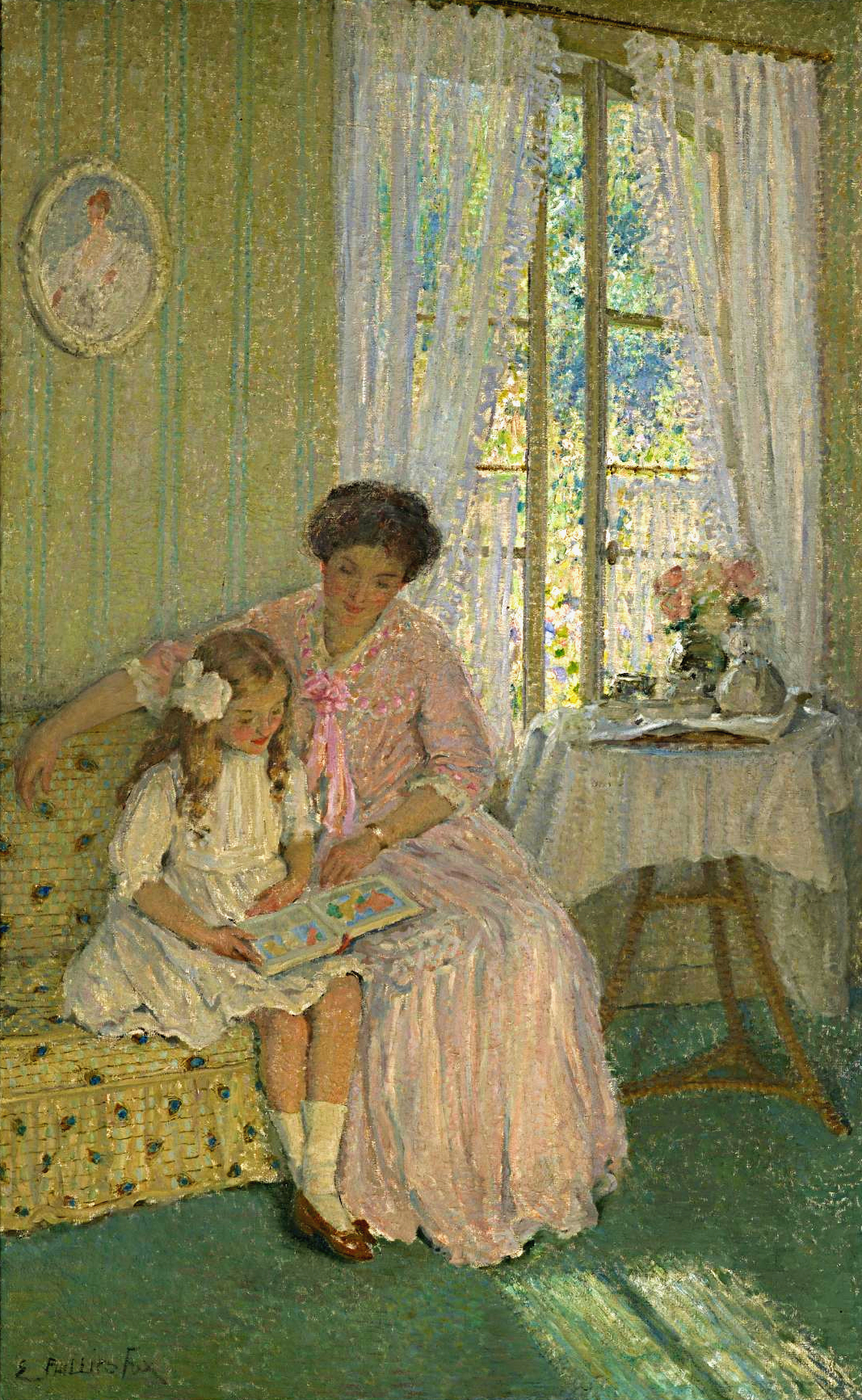
The Lesson, 1912

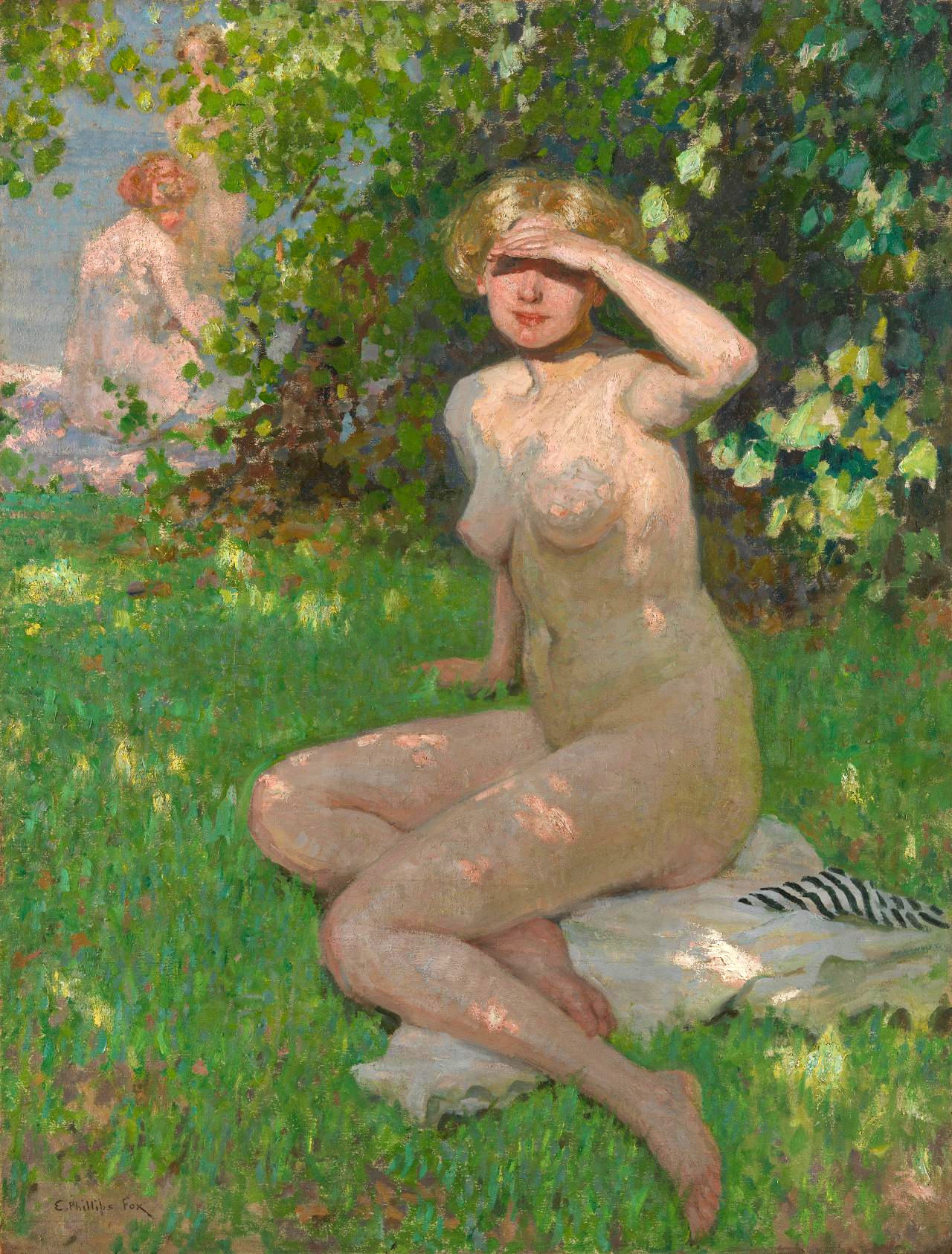
The Bathers, 1912
