= Nasturtiums (E. Phillips Fox) =

Painting by E. Phillips Fox

- Miss Edith Anderson, Mrs Penleigh Boyd, Reading in the garden
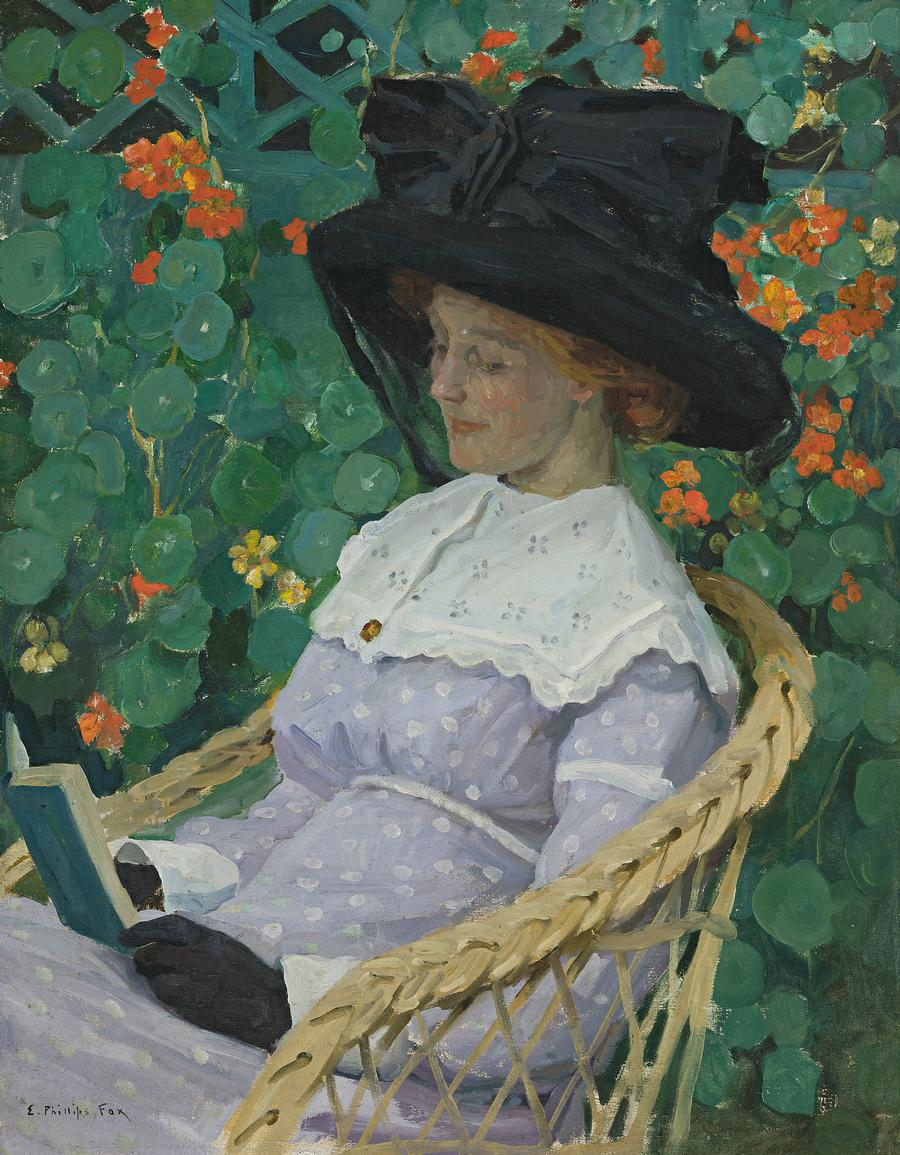
- Artist: E. Phillips Fox
- Year: c. 1912
- Type: oil painting
- Dimensions: 91.5 cm × 71.5 cm (62.4 in × 47.4 in)
- Location: Art Gallery of New South Wales, Sydney

Nasturtiums is an oil painting by the Australian Impressionist painter Emanuel Phillips Fox painted in 1912 during a period of great creativity for the artist in which he produced some of his finest works. It shows a woman, Edith Susan Gerard Anderson, wearing a printed mauve dress, black hat and black gloves, reading in a garden seated in a cane chair against a background of climbing nasturtium leaves and flowers growing up a trellis.

After being owned by the model's family, the Boyds, since its creation, the painting was purchased in 2011 at auction by the Society of the Art Gallery of New South Wales as a memorial to Margaret Olley, a Sydney painter and longtime patron of the gallery who had died a few months earlier. Fox was one of Olley's favourite artists and the museum's curator of Australian art said the painting's "combination of the poetic and the pragmatic, the decorative and the real", reflected Olley's own aesthetic preoccupations".

== Artist ==
Emanuel Phillips Fox was an Australian painter living in Paris at the time that he produced this and several other paintings that depict the artist's wife and friends in the context of Parisian domesticity during the Belle Époque. Fox had married the Australian artist Ethel Carrick in 1905 in London in a ceremony attended by Rupert Bunny, another expatriate Australian artist and friend. The couples lived near to one another in Paris, and the friendship between the artists is regarded as having "beneficial influences" on one another's art.

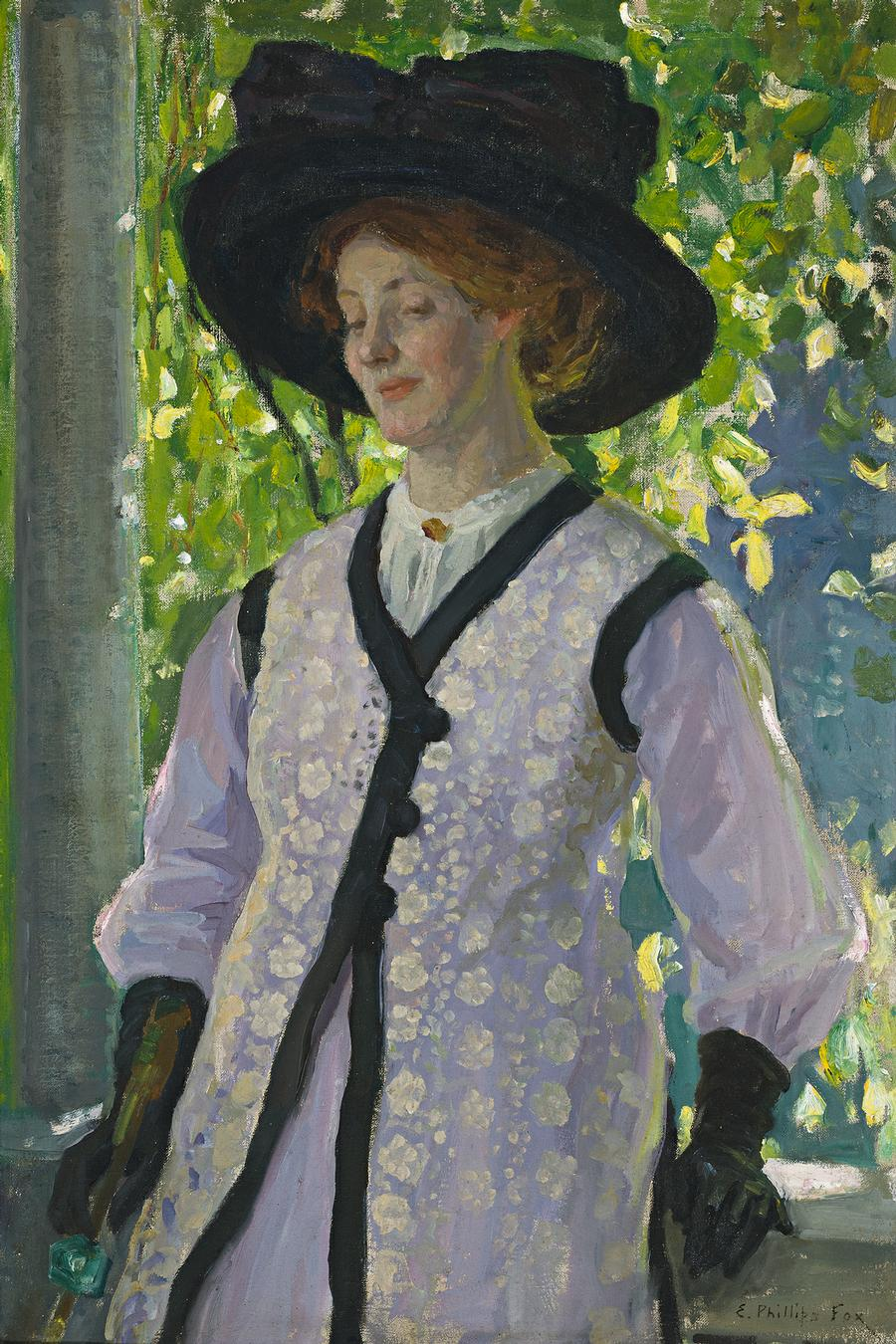
E. Phillips Fox – On the Balcony, 1912

== Model ==
The model in the painting is Fox's friend Edith Susan Gerard Anderson (1878–1961), who was also the model for other paintings by Fox, including On the Balcony, (Fr: Sur le Balcon) and The Green Parasol painted in the same year (1912). Born in Brisbane, Anderson had studied under Fox. Her red hair is notable in many of Fox's paintings. Anderson and her future husband, Penleigh Boyd, were close friends of the artist who "was attracted by her rich auburn hair and grey-green eyes—both fashionable at the time." Fox introduced Anderson to Boyd, who had an adjoining studio in Paris. The two married in October 1912. Their son, Robin Boyd, became one of Australia's best known architects and their nephew, Arthur Boyd, one of Australia's best known painters. The Boyd family owned the painting until its acquisition by the Art Gallery of New South Wales. Given these dates, the creation of Nasturtiums and On the Balcony has been estimated as early September 1912. One critic described paintings such as Nasturtiums and On the Balcony as "full of tender sympathy for the model".

== Subject ==
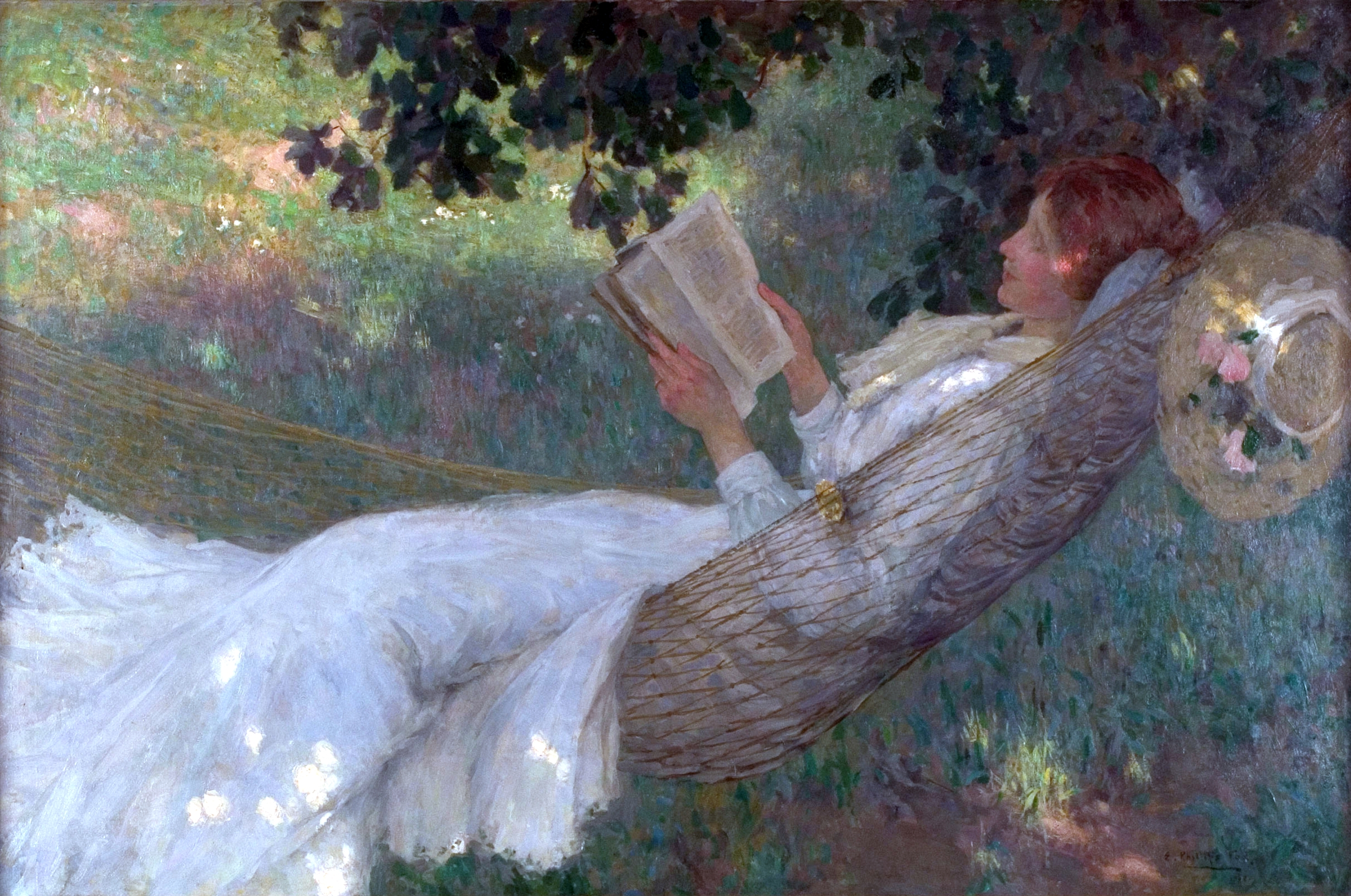
E. Phillips Fox – A Love Story, 1903 in the Ballarat Fine Art Gallery

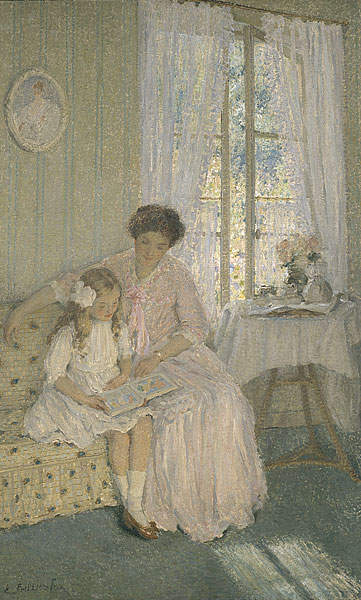
E. Phillips Fox – The Lesson, c. 1912 in the National Gallery of Victoria

Nasturtiums is one of a series of paintings of women in gardens that Fox created in 1911–12. Many were painted in-situ in the small central courtyard garden of the Fox studio-apartment on Boulevard Arago in Montparnasse. Although the subject is known and recognisable from other works, the painting's title and the period in which it was painted show that it is an example of how "the borderline between portrait and subject painting was often blurred." At the time, in spite of the fact that portraiture was popular and likeness to the subject valued in the salons, artists were showing a growing interest in the formal aspects of the work and they had begun to name their paintings after their aesthetic elements. Fox has not given the model's name as the title of this work, giving it instead the title of a subject picture, thereby directing the viewer's attention to the setting and his interest in the aesthetic values of that setting.

In spite of these formal and decorative intentions, the painting is one in which "the artist illustrated the elegance of the Belle Époque and the sunny pastimes of the bourgeoisie". Fox frequently painted women reading in both indoor and outdoor settings, another example is A Love Story (1903) in the Ballarat Fine Art Gallery which shows an elegantly dressed young lady reading a novel while lying in a hammock in the shade of a tree on a summer's day. In paintings of the time, women reading were often placed in an outdoor setting where gardens, foliage and the effects of the light were part of the subject matter. Claude Monet, for example, painted Springtime in 1872. Fox's The Lesson (1912) in the National Gallery of Victoria Melbourne, shows a woman and girl reading in an indoor, domestic setting.

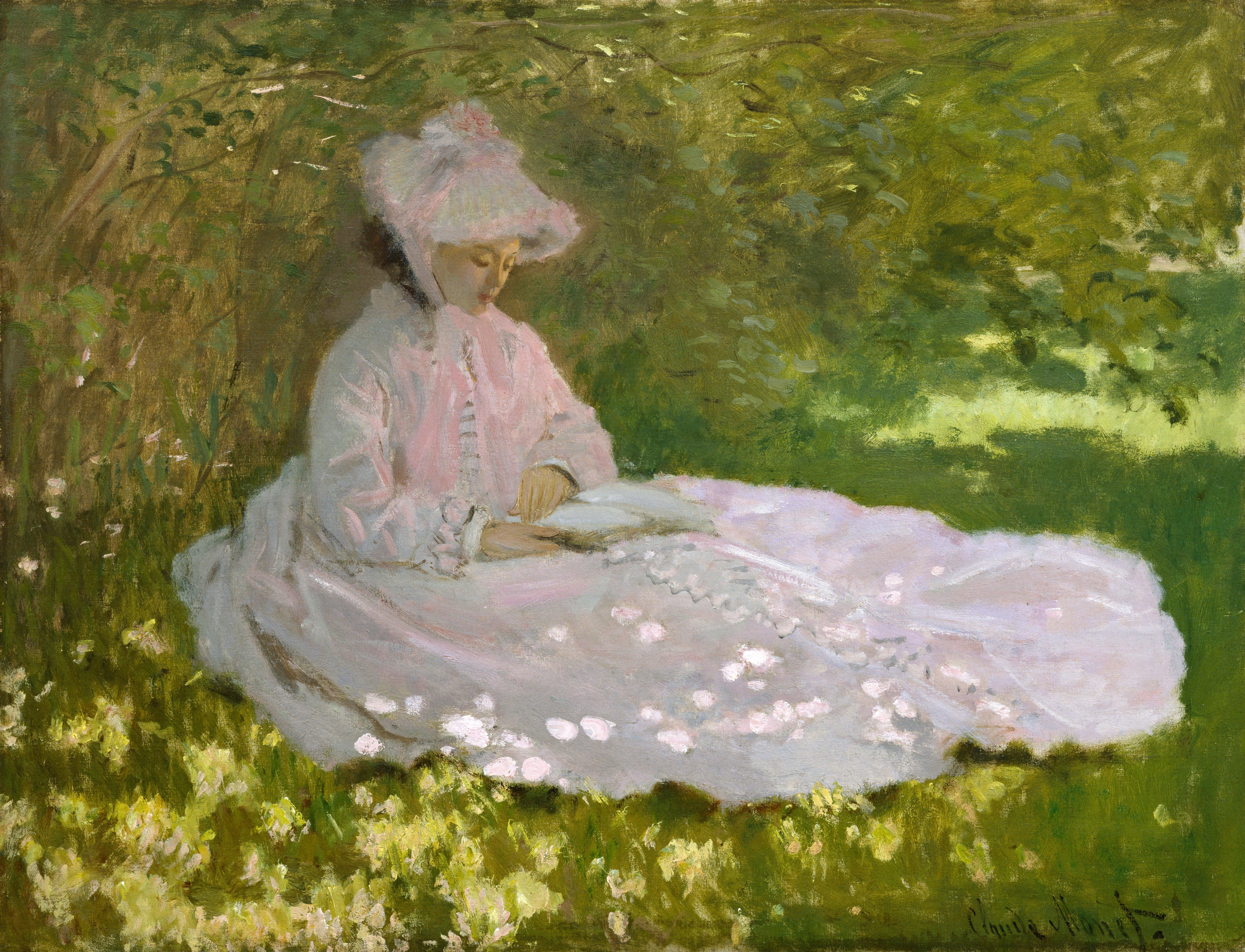
Claude Monet – Springtime, 1872 in the Walters Art Museum

It has been argued that such relaxed poses and settings were regarded as "typically feminine" and that paintings of men reading were different in that men are typically portrayed indoors as "busy, upright, professional, erudite" with serious non-fiction books around them.

== Critical assessment ==
In Zubans' major study of Phillips Fox's work the painting is described as "exquisite" and "enchanting". The Senior Curator of Australian Art at the Gallery described Nasturtiums as "the most significant in a series of women-in-garden paintings which Phillips Fox created over 1911–12"

The dappled light and decorative approach seen in the painting are characteristic of Fox's work, although it is less warm than other similar Fox paintings, such as Sur le Balcon or The Green Parasol. The uncharacteristic "dampening down of atmosphere and light" has been attributed to the weather in Paris at the time – which according to Fox's friend Rupert Bunny was very cold and wet.

Japanese print design influenced Fox during the period this painting was done and its arrangement of colours is noted as an effect of those influences. "Arrangements" of colour had become important aesthetic components of paintings. Fox would have been aware of the most famous "arrangement" – Whistler's Arrangement in Grey and Black No 1 (known as Whistler's Mother) – which had been painted in 1871 and acquired by a Parisian museum in 1891. Fox's arrangement of the mauve and black colours (seen again in On the Balcony), has been compared to the way "a still-life painter would arrange the objects of his composition, for greatest formal effect". Various elements of the painting, including "the lack of perspective" which gives "an impression of a flat space, invaded by motifs: the leaves on the trellis, the red touches provided by the flowers, the white dots on the dress, the weaving on the wicker chair" are described as "all corresponding to a very pleasing Japanese aesthetics which recalls Vuillard.

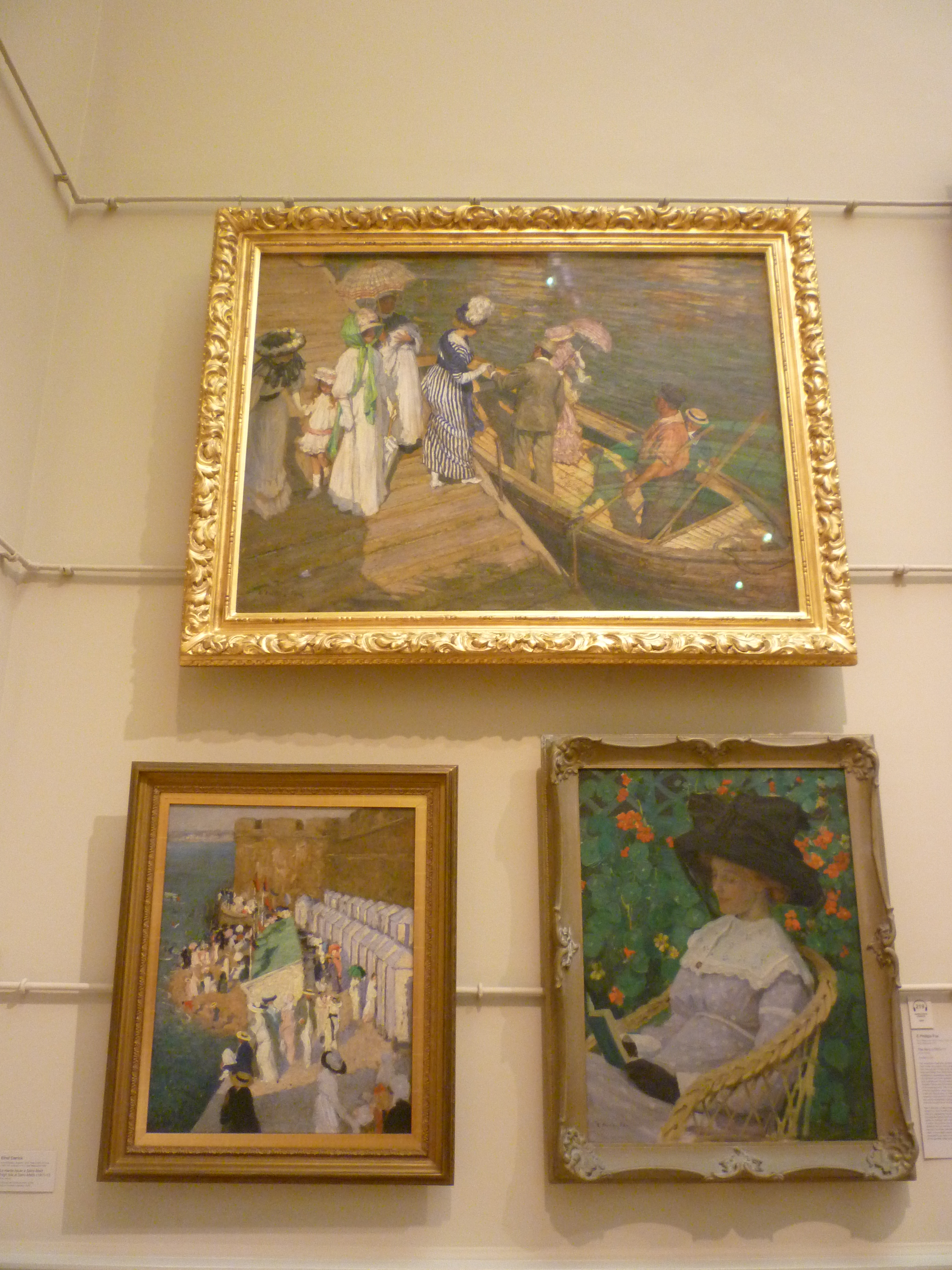
Nasturtiums hung in the Art Gallery of New South Wales with Fox's The Ferry and Carrick's La marée haute a Saint-Malô (High tide at St Malô)

== Provenance ==
Nasturtiums was given by the artist to Edith Boyd c1912, then inherited by her son Robin (of Melbourne) in 1961, and by his widow Patricia upon his 1971 death, becoming became part of her estate following her own death in 2008. It came into a public collection for the first time when it was sold at auction by Deutscher and Hackett to the Art Gallery of New South Wales in August 2011 for A$600,000.

== Exhibited ==
- 13–28 October 1913: Nasturtiums is listed as #11 in the Catalogue of Pictures by E.Phillips Fox, on sale for 50 guineas at The Royal Art Society, 76 Pitt Street.
- 9 November 1994 – 30 January 1995: E. Phillips Fox, 1865–1915, National Gallery of Victoria, Melbourne, cat. 52
- 16 April – 7 August 2011: in Art, Love and Life: Ethel Carrick and E. Phillips Fox, Queensland Art Gallery, Brisbane,

== See also ==
- Boyd family
- Nasturtiums (1892) by Gustave Caillebotte

== Bibliography ==
- "Nasturtiums" AGNSW record of work
- Catalogue of an exhibition held at the Deutscher Fine Art Gallery 13 November – 6 December 1997. Deutscher and Hackett, Surry Hills, New South Wales, 1997
- Eagle, Mary. The Oil Paintings of E. Phillips Fox in the National Gallery of Australia, National Gallery of Australia, Canberra, 1997 ISBN 0-642-13086-8
- Fox, Len, E., Phillips Fox and his family, 1985 published by the author ISBN 0-9589239-1-4
- Goddard, A., Art, Love and Life: Ethel Carrick and E. Phillips Fox, Queensland Art Gallery, Brisbane, 2011, pp. 96, 158 (illus. p. 97)
- Gray, Anne, Face: Australian portraits 1880–1960 National Gallery of Australia, Canberra, 2010 ISBN 978-0-642-33415-2
- Look Art Gallery Society of New South Wales, November 2011 p15
- Lyons, Martyn and John Arnold (eds) Paper Empires: A History of the Book in Australia v2 1891–1945: a national culture in a colonised market, University of Queensland Press, St Lucia, 2001 ISBN 0-7022-3234-3
- Masters, David, Emanuel Phillips Fox (1865–1915) in Deutscher and Hackett Fine Art Auction Catalogue (Lot 12 Nasturtiums for sale at auction 31 August 2011, Melbourne), Surry Hills, New South Wales, 2011, p36
- McDonald, John, in The Sydney Morning Herald 30 April 2011 – 1 May 2011, "Spectrum" section p. 11
- St Georges, Bénédicte Bonnet The Art Tribune, "A Painting by Emanuel Phillips Fox Acquired by Sydney" 15 December 2011
- Zubans, R., E. Phillips Fox 1865–1915, National Gallery of Victoria, Melbourne, 1994, cat. 52, p. 66 (illus.) ISBN 0-7241-0171-3
- Zubans, R., E. Phillips Fox, His Life and Art, Miegunyah Press, Melbourne, 1995, cat. 406, p. 150, pl. C67 (illus.) ISBN 0-522-84653-X
