= Ethel Carrick =

English Impressionist and Post-Impressionist painter

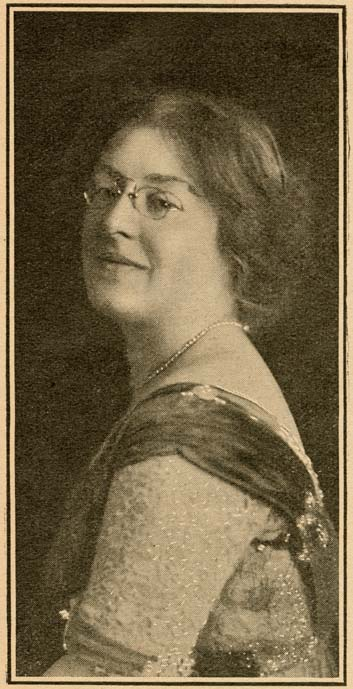
- Ethel Carrick, c.1912
- Born: 7 February 1872; Uxbridge, Middlesex, England
- Died: 17 June 1952 (aged 80); Melbourne, Australia
- Education: Guildhall School of Music; Slade School of Fine Art
- Movement: Impressionism, Post-Impressionism
- Spouse: Emanuel Phillips Fox

Ethel Carrick, later Ethel Carrick Fox (7 February 1872 – 17 June 1952) was an English Impressionist and Post-Impressionist painter. Much of her career was spent in France and in Australia, where she was associated with the movement known as the Heidelberg School.

== Life ==
Ethel Carrick was born in Uxbridge, Middlesex, to Emma (Filmer) Carrick and Albert William Carrick, a wealthy draper. The family of ten children lived at Brookfield House, Uxbridge. She trained in London at the Guildhall School of Music and at the Slade School of Fine Art under Henry Tonks (ca. 1898-1903). She married the Australian Impressionist painter Emanuel Phillips Fox in 1905. They moved to Paris, where they remained until 1913. She travelled widely in Europe, North Africa, and the South Pacific (Tahiti) during this period and made trips to Australia in 1908 and 1913.

The outbreak of World War I brought Carrick and her husband to Melbourne, Australia, where they organised to raise war funds from artists and to support the French Red Cross.

In the early 1940s, Ethel Carrick spent some time in Canberra, in the Australian Capital Territory (ACT) to paint local landscapes. During 1942-32, the local newspaper The Canberra Times reported that she resided with the Tillyard family, based in Mugga Way, Red Hill in Canberra. Of particular note is her paintings of St John's Church in Reid, and Parliament House in Parkes, Canberra. Between 1941 and 1943, Carrick supported Australian women's efforts for national service by painting scenes of the Lady Gowrie Services Club and the Canberra Services Club in Manuka, Canberra.

Her husband, Emanuel Phillips Fox, died of cancer in 1915. The following year, Carrick began two decades of travels that took her through the Middle East, South Asia including India, and Europe. She returned intermittently to Australia to exhibit her work and go out on painting expeditions around the country. In the 1920s, she was recommended by the Académie de la Grande Chaumière in Paris as a private teacher of still life painting, and she counted a number of Australians and Americans in Paris among her students.

Ethel Carrick died in Kew, Melbourne on 17 June 1952, aged 80.

== Art career and critical estimation ==
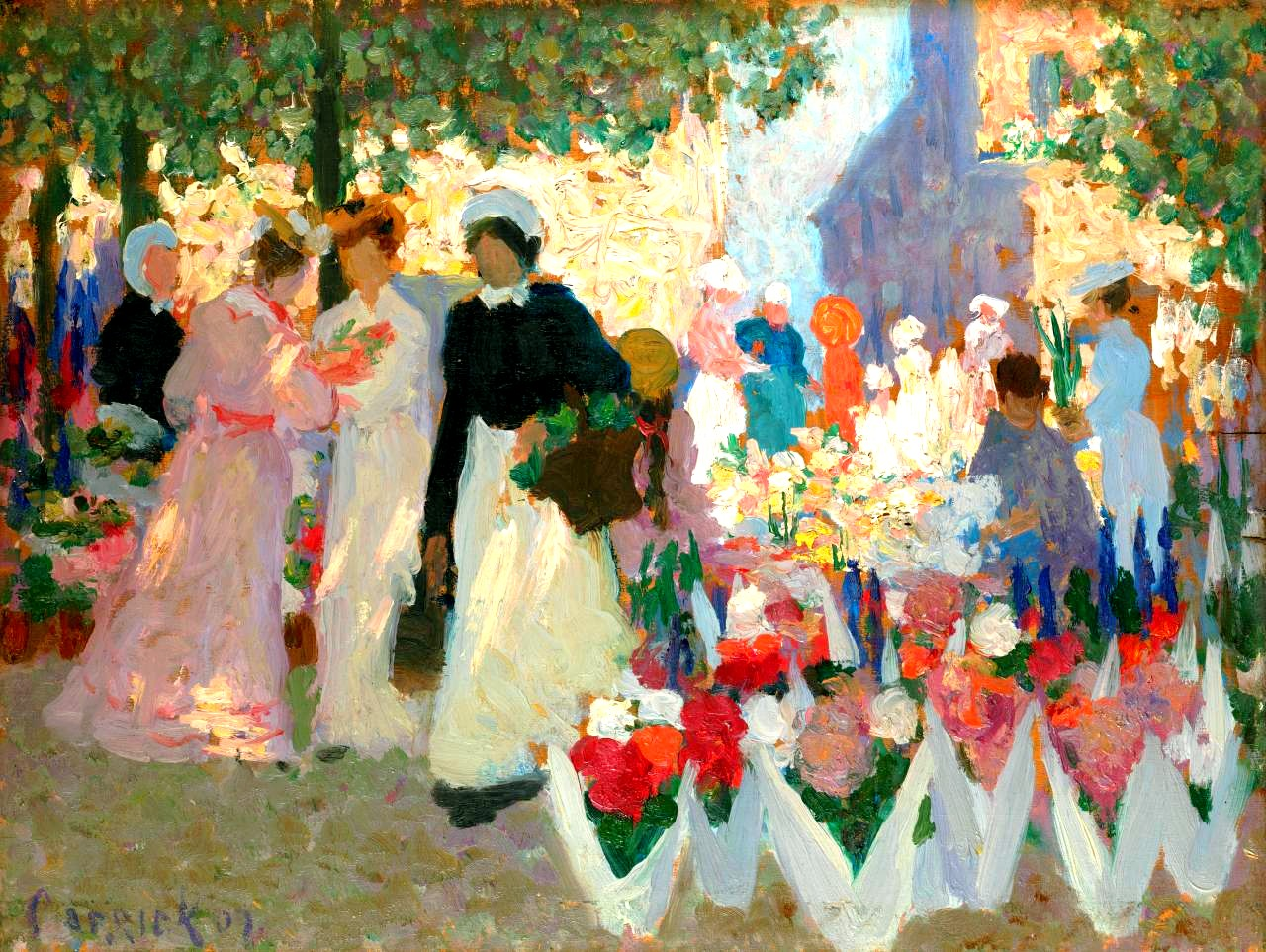
Paris. Flower market. 1907. National Gallery of Victoria

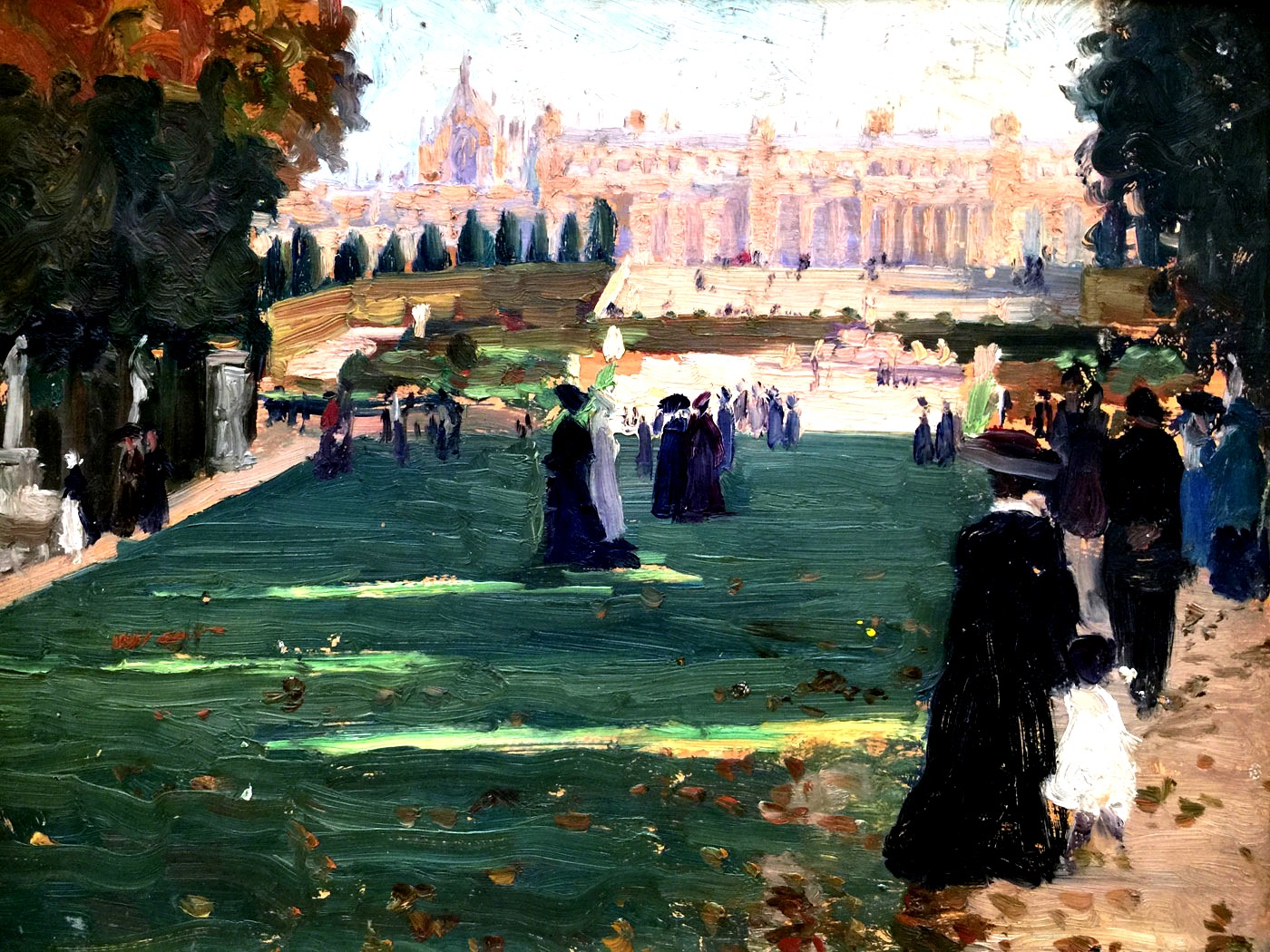
Untitled (Royal Avenue, Versailles), c.1909. Castlemaine Art Museum

Mainly a painter, Carrick is known for her floral still life, landscapes and scenes of outdoor urban life in parks and on beaches. Some of these draw on her international travels, such as her paintings of outdoor markets in the Middle East and elsewhere. In the 1920s, she began painting flower studies, which overall are more conventional than her earlier work. In the 1930s, she created some lithographs, and during World War II, which she spent in Australia, she painted some scenes of women war workers.

Carrick began as an Impressionist plein air painter but fairly quickly moved to a more Post-Impressionist style featuring blockier compositions and sharper colour contrasts. Some of the works produced around 1911-12 are distinctly Fauvist in their strong colours, high abstraction, and loose handling of the paint.

Carrick first showed her work in London in 1903. She exhibited at the Paris Salon d'Automne from 1906 onwards, the London Royal Academy of Arts, the Société Nationale des Beaux-Arts (from 1906 on), and various progressive galleries in Melbourne and Sydney, Australia (from 1908 on). In addition to her own solo and group exhibitions, she was in dual shows with her husband at the Melbourne Athenaeum in 1914 and again in 1944.

In 1911, she became sociétaire of the Salon d'Automne, and she served as a jury member from 1912 to around 1925, both unusual positions for women to hold and marks of the high regard in which she was held by the Paris art world. Prior to World War I, she also served as the vice-president of the International Union of Women Artists. Late in her career, in the 1940s and 1950s, she exhibited with the Melbourne Society of Women Painters and Sculptors.

In her lifetime, Carrick's reputation was eclipsed by her husband's, in part because she spent a good deal of her time promoting his career rather than her own, lobbying Australian collectors and curators to buy his work and arranging exhibitions both while he was alive and posthumously. In recent years, her reputation has been rising, and critics today consider her work more adventurous than that of her husband. In 1996, one of her paintings set an auction record of A$105,500 for works by an Australian woman artist, and the following year saw the publication of a biography, Ethel Carrick Fox: Travels and Triumphs of a Post-Impressionist by art historian Susanna de Vries. Her Market Under Trees, sold by Sotheby's in 1999 for A$266,500, was bought at auction for just over A$1 million in 2008.

In 1993, the Waverley City Gallery in Melbourne held the exhibition "Capturing the Orient: Hilda Rix Nicholas & Ethel Carrick in the East", and in 2011, the Queensland Art Gallery held a joint retrospective of the work of Carrick and her husband. In 2024, the National Gallery of Australia held paired solo exhibitions for Ethel Carrick and Anne Dangar. A publication was released alongside the exhibition including essays on Carrick by Rebecca Blake, Angela Goddard, Emma Kindred, Jenny McFarlane, Denise Mimmocchi, and Juliette Peers.

== Exhibitions ==
=== Solo ===
- 1908: Bernard's Gallery, Collins Street, Melbourne, August
- 1913: 'Paintings by Mrs E Phillips Fox (Miss Ethel Carrick)', The Guildhall, Melbourne, 11–26 July
- 1913: 'Exhibition of Pictures by Mrs E Phillips Fox (Ethel Carrick)', Anthony Hordern's Fine Art Gallery, Sydney, 6–22 November
- 1916: 'Exhibition of Oil Paintings by Mrs E Phillips Fox', Anthony Hordern's Fine Art Gallery, Sydney, April
- 1925: 'Exhibition of Paintings by Ethel Carrick (Mrs E Phillips Fox)', The New Gallery, Melbourne, 2–13 June
- 1928: 'Exposition Ethel Carrick', Galerie de la Palette Française, Paris, 5–19 June
- 1933: 'Ethel Carrick (Mrs E Phillips Fox) Exhibition of Pictures', Everyman's Lending Library, Melbourne, 24 May - 7 June
- 1949: 'Pictures by Ethel Carrick (Mrs E Phillips Fox)', Melbourne Book Club Gallery, 20 June - 2 July
- 1949: 'Exhibition of Pictures by Ethel Carrick (Mrs E Phillips Fox)', John Martin's Gallery, Adelaide, 4–18 October
- 1979: 'Ethel Carrick (Mrs E Phillips Fox): A Retrospective Exhibition', Geelong Art Gallery, 30 March - 4 May 1979; toured to SH Ervin Gallery, Sydney, 11 May - 3 June; University Art Museum, Brisbane, 13 June - 5 July
- 2024: 'Ethel Carrick', National Gallery of Australia, 7 December 2024 - 27 April 2025

=== Group exhibitions held during the artist's lifetime ===
- 1903: Society of Oil Painters, London, 19 October - 12 December
- 1904: Felix Art Club (Alpine Art Club), London
- 1905: International Society, London International Society of Sculptors, Painters and Gravers January–February, March–May, May, October–December
- 1906: Institute of Oil Painters, London 15 October - 12 December
- 1906: Felix Art Club, London
- 1906: Salon d'Automne, Paris
- 1906: Société Nationale des Beaux-Arts, Paris
- 1907: Institute of Oil Painters, London 14 October - 12 December
- 1907: Salon d' Automne, Paris
- 1907: Societe Nationale des Beaux-Arts, Paris
- 1907: Royal Academy, London
- 1908: Societe Nationale des Beaux Arts, Paris
- 1908: Societe Les Quelques, Galerie des Artistes Modernes, Paris
- 1908: Salon d' Automne, Paris
- 1908: Allied Artists Association, London, July
- 1909: 'La Libre Esthetique, Catalogue de la seizieme Exposition a Bruxelles', Brussels, Belgium, 7 March - 12 April
- 1909: Societe Les Quelques, Galerie des Artistes Modernes, Paris, February
- 1909: Salon d'Automne, Paris
- 1909: Allied Artists Association, London
- 1909: Victorian Artists Society, Melbourne
- 1910: Societe Nationale des Beaux Arts, Paris
- 1910: Societe Les Quelques, Galerie des Artistes Modernes, Paris, February
- 1910: Salon d'Automne, Paris
- 1911: Societe Les Quelques, Galerie des Artistes Modernes, Paris, February
- 1911: Salon d'Automne, Paris
- 1911: Societe Nationale des Beaux-Arts, Paris
- 1912: Societe Nationale des Beaux-Arts, Paris
- 1912: Salon d'Automne, Paris
- 1913: Societe des Peintres Orientalistes Français 21e Exposition, Grand Palais, Paris, 2–28 February
- 1915: 'Australian Artists War Fund Exhibition', Royal Art Society Rooms, Sydney, 9 March
- 1915: 'Australian Art Association 3rd Annual Exhibition', Athenaeum, Melbourne, 7–21 October
- 1915: Red Cross Fund, Melbourne, March
- 1916: 'Art Curio and Antique Exhibition for the French Week Appeal Fund', Town Hall, Melbourne, July
- 1916: Royal Society of Oil Painters, London, November
- 1917: Royal Academy, London
- 1918: 'Salon des Poilus, Exhibition of Pictures for Sale', Athenaeum Gallery, Melbourne, 6–20 July (in aid of the French Red Cross)
- 1918: 'Exposition de l'Arc-en-Ciel', Galerie de Goupil & Cie, Paris, 8 October - 3 November
- 1919: Salon d' Automne, Paris: 315 Mme de Marquette
- 1920: Societe Nationale des Beaux-Arts, Paris
- 1921: Societe Nationale des Beaux-Arts, Paris
- 1921: Salon d'Automne, Paris
- 1921: Societe des Artistes lndependants, Paris
- 1921: 'Exposition de la Societe coloniale des Artistes Français', Societe des Artistes Français, Grand Palais des Champs Elysees, Paris
- 1922: Salon d'Automne, Paris
- 1922: Societe Nationale des Beaux-Arts, Paris
- 1923: Societe Nationale des Beaux-Arts, Paris
- 1923: Salon d' Automne, Paris
- 1923: 'Group of Australian Artists', Panton Galleries, London, November
- 1924: 'Exhibition of Paintings and Sculptures by Australian Artists in Europe', Faculty of Arts, London, 23 June -12 July
- 1924: Societe Nationale des Beaux-Arts, Paris
- 1924: Salon d'Automne, Paris
- 1926: Salon d'Automne, Paris
- 1927: Societe Nationale des Beaux-Arts, Paris
- 1927: Salon d'Automne, Paris
- 1928: Societe Nationale des Beaux-Arts, Paris
- 1928: Salon d'Automne, Paris
- 1928: International exhibition, Bordeaux: Manly Beach - summer is here (awarded diplome d'honneur)
- 1929: Societe Nationale des Beaux-Arts, Paris
- 1929: Salon d'Automne, Paris
- 1929: Societe des Amis des Arts de Bordeaux, Paris
- 1930: Salon d'Automne, Paris
- 1930: Societe Nationale des Beaux-Arts, Paris
- 1930: Societe des Amis des Arts de Bordeaux, Paris
- 1931: Societe Nationale des Beaux-Arts, Paris
- 1931: Salon d'Automne, Paris
- 1932: Societe Nationale des Beaux-Arts, Paris
- 1931: Salon d'Automne, Paris
- 1933: Societe Nationale des Beaux-Arts, Paris
- 1933: Everyman's Lending Library, Melbourne, May
- 1934: 'An Exhibition by Melbourne Painters', Athenaeum Gallery, Melbourne, 27 February- 10 March (in aid of the Hermannsburg water supply, Central Australia)
- 1935: Societe Nationale des Beaux-Arts, Paris
- 1936: Royal Academy, London
- 1937: Societe Nationale des Beaux-Arts, Paris
- 1937: Royal Academy, London
- 1937: Salon d'Automne, Paris
- 1937: Royal Academy, London
- 1937: Salon d' Automne
- 1939: Royal Academy, London
- 1939: Societe Nationale des Beaux-Arts, Paris
- 1943-45: Victorian Artists' Society, Melbourne
- 1944: 'Paintings by Ethel Phillips Fox, Jean Sutherland and Sybil Craig', KozminskyLower Gallery, Melbourne, 21 November- 1 December
- 1945: Macquarie Galleries, Bligh Street, Sydney, 14–26 March
- 1945: Anthony Hordern's Fine Art Gallery, Sydney
- 1946: 'French Comfort Fund Exhibition', David Jones Art Gallery, Sydney, 20–28 February
- 1946: 'French Comfort Fund', Myer's Art Gallery, Melbourne, 19–29 March
- 1947: Victorian Artists' Society, Melbourne
- 1951: Royal Scottish Academy, Edinburgh
- 1951: Royal Institute of Oil Painters, London
