= Camille Pissarro =

Danish-French painter (1830–1903)

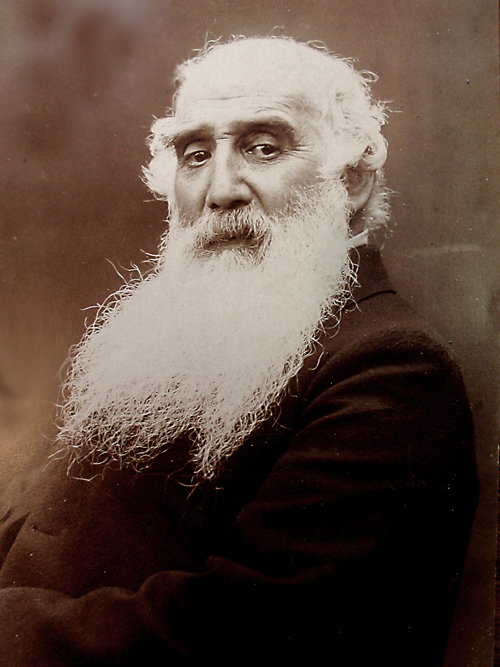
- Camille Pissarro, c. 1900
- Born: Jacob Abraham Camille Pissarro; 10 July 1830; Charlotte Amalie, Saint Thomas, Danish West Indies
- Died: 13 November 1903 (aged 73); Paris, France
- Known for: Painting
- Movement: Impressionism; Post-Impressionism

Jacob Abraham Camille Pissarro (/pɪˈsɑːroʊ/ piss-AR-oh; French: [kamij pisaʁo]; 10 July 1830 – 13 November 1903) was a Danish-French Impressionist and Neo-Impressionist painter born on the island of Saint Thomas (now in the United States Virgin Islands, but then in the Danish West Indies). His importance resides in his contributions to both Impressionism and Post-Impressionism. Pissarro studied from great forerunners, including Gustave Courbet and Jean-Baptiste-Camille Corot. He later studied and worked alongside Georges Seurat and Paul Signac when he took on the Neo-Impressionist style at the age of 54.

In 1873 he helped establish a collective society of fifteen aspiring artists, becoming the "pivotal" figure in holding the group together and encouraging the other members. Art historian John Rewald called Pissarro the "dean of the Impressionist painters", not only because he was the oldest of the group, but also "by virtue of his wisdom and his balanced, kind, and warmhearted personality". Paul Cézanne said "he was a father for me. A man to consult and a little like the good Lord", and he was also one of Paul Gauguin's masters. Pierre-Auguste Renoir referred to his work as "revolutionary", through his artistic portrayals of the "common man", as Pissarro insisted on painting individuals in natural settings without "artifice or grandeur".

Pissarro is the only artist to have shown his work at all eight Paris Impressionist exhibitions, from 1874 to 1886. He "acted as a father figure not only to the Impressionists" but to all four of the major Post-Impressionists, Cézanne, Seurat, Gauguin, and Van Gogh.

== Early years ==
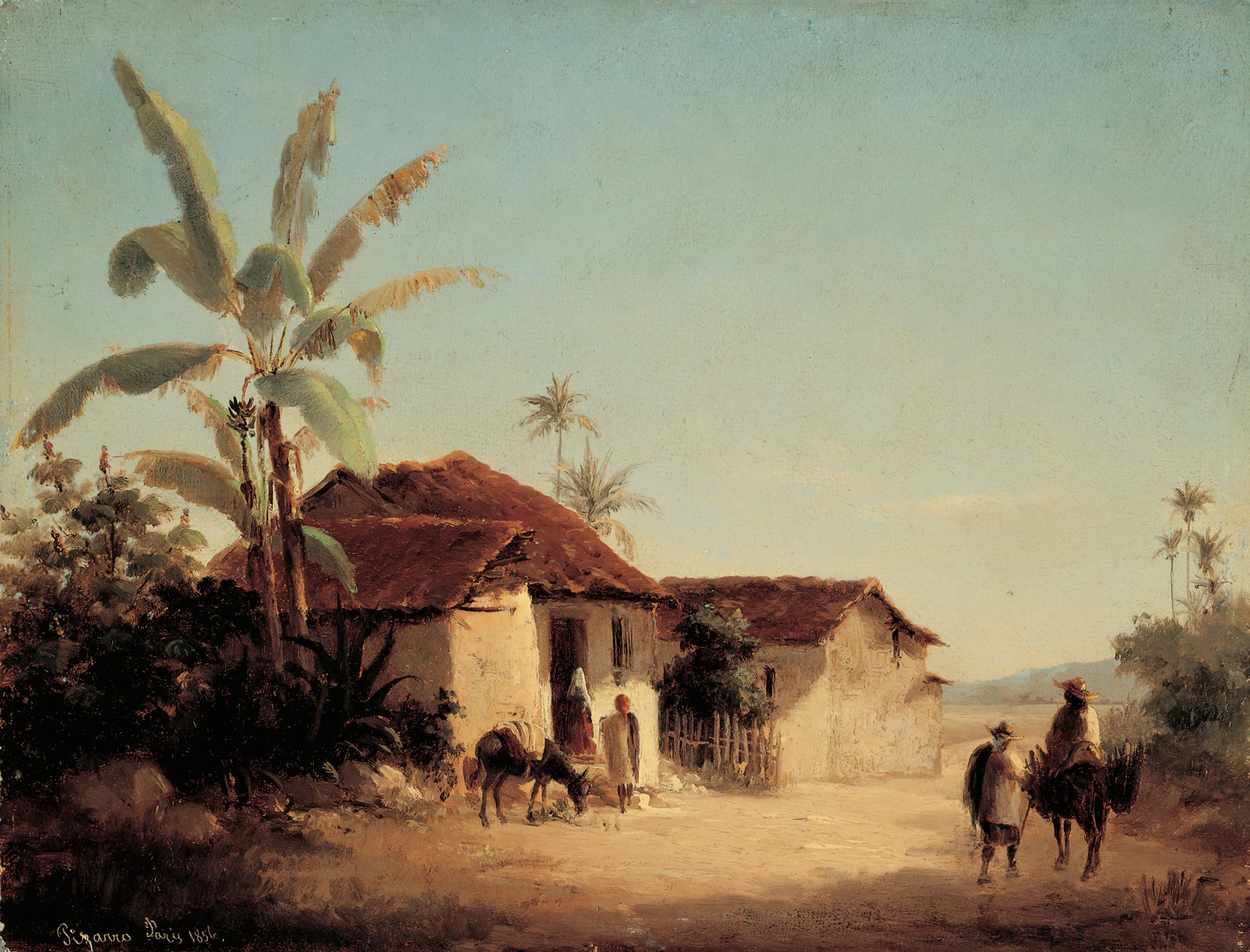
Landscape with Farmhouses and Palm Trees, c. 1853. Galería de Arte Nacional, Caracas

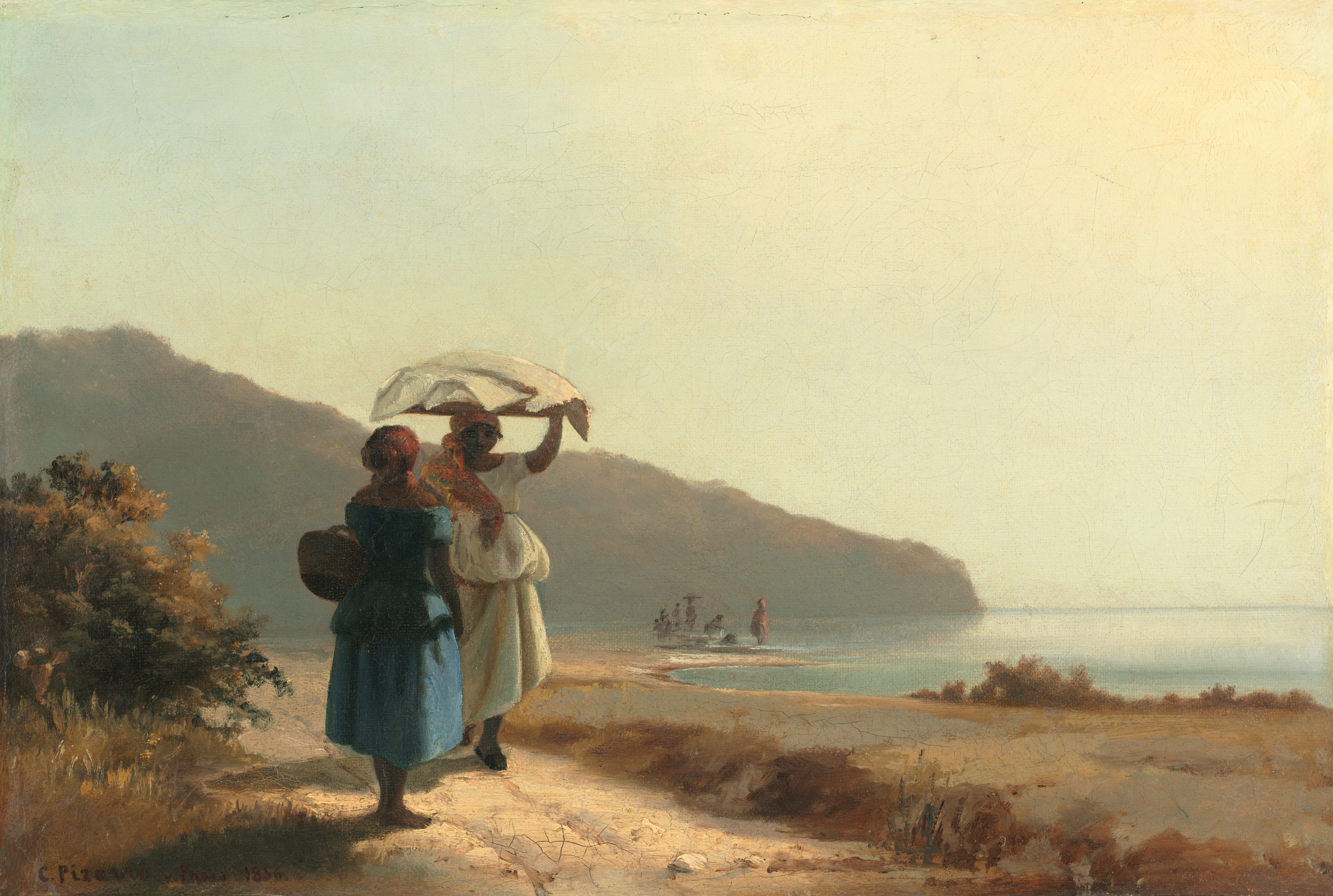
Two Women Chatting by the Sea, St. Thomas, 1856

Jacob Abraham Camille Pissarro was born on 10 July 1830 at Charlotte Amalie on the island of Saint Thomas to Frederick Abraham Gabriel Pissarro and Rachel Manzano-Pomié. His father was of Portuguese Jewish descent and held French nationality. His mother was from a French-Jewish family from St. Thomas with Provençal Jewish roots. His father was a merchant who came to the island from France to deal with the hardware store of a deceased uncle, Isaac Petit, and married his widow. The marriage caused a stir within St. Thomas's small Jewish community because she was previously married to Frederick's uncle and according to Jewish law, a man is forbidden to marry his aunt. As a result, his four children were barred from attending the local Jewish school, instead being sent to an all-black primary school. Upon his death, his will specified that his estate be split equally between the synagogue and St. Thomas' Protestant church.

When Pissarro was twelve his father sent him to boarding school in France. He studied at the Savary Academy in Passy near Paris. While a young student, he developed an early appreciation of the French art masters. Monsieur Savary himself gave him a strong grounding in drawing and painting and suggested he draw from nature when he returned to St. Thomas.

After his schooling, Pissarro returned to St. Thomas at the age of sixteen or seventeen, where his father had Pissarro work in his business as a port clerk. Nevertheless, Pissarro took every opportunity during the next five years at the job to practice drawing during breaks and after work.

Visual theorist Nicholas Mirzoeff argues that the young Pissarro was inspired by the artworks of James Gay Sawkins, a British painter and geologist who lived in Charlotte Amalie, St. Thomas circa 1847. Pissarro may have attended art classes taught by Sawkins and seen Sawkins's paintings of Mitla, Mexico. Mirzoeff states, "A formal analysis suggests that [Sawkins's] work influenced the young Pissarro, who had just returned to the island from his school in France. Soon afterward, Pissarro began his own drawings of the local African population in apparent imitation of Sawkins", creating "sketches for a postslavery imagination".

When Pissarro turned twenty-one, Danish artist Fritz Melbye, then living on St. Thomas, inspired him to take on painting as a full-time profession, becoming his teacher and friend. Pissarro then chose to leave his family and job and live in Venezuela, where he and Melbye spent the next two years working as artists in Caracas and La Guaira. He drew everything he could, including landscapes, village scenes, and numerous sketches, enough to fill up multiple sketchbooks.

== Life in France ==
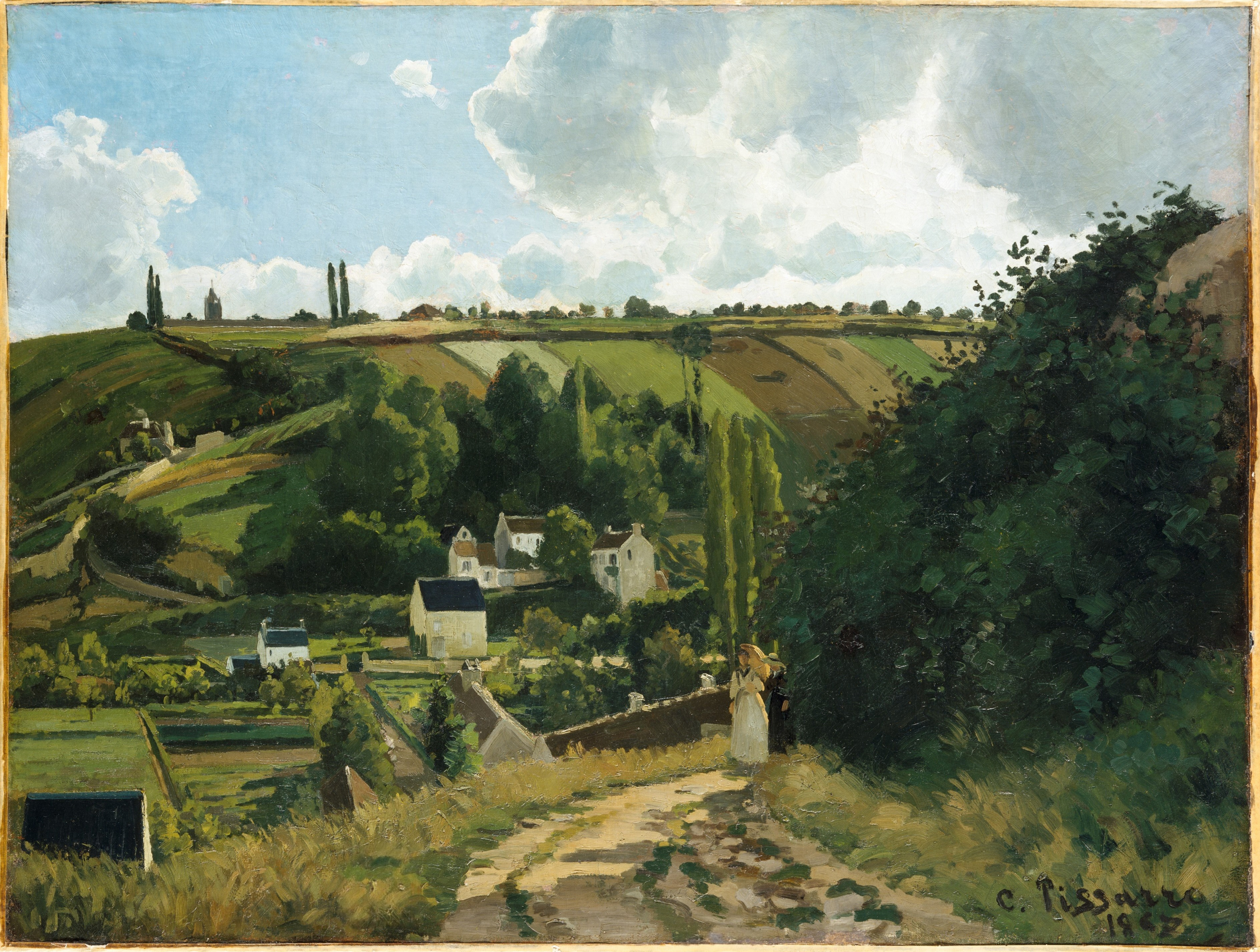
Jalais Hill, Pontoise, 1867. Metropolitan Museum of Art

In 1855, at the age of 25, Pissarro opted to move back to Paris, where he began working as an assistant to Anton Melbye, Fritz Melbye's brother and also a painter. He also studied paintings by other artists whose style impressed him: Courbet, Charles-François Daubigny, Jean-François Millet, and Corot. He also enrolled in various classes taught by masters, at schools such as École des Beaux-Arts and Académie Suisse. But Pissarro eventually found their teaching methods "stifling", states art historian John Rewald. This prompted him to search for alternative instruction, which he requested and received from Corot.

=== Paris Salon and Corot's influence ===
His initial paintings were in accord with the standards at the time to be displayed at the Paris Salon, the official body whose academic traditions dictated the kind of art that was acceptable. The Salon's annual exhibition was essentially the only marketplace for young artists to gain exposure. As a result, Pissarro worked in the traditional and prescribed manner to satisfy the tastes of its official committee.

In 1859 his first painting was accepted and exhibited. His other paintings during that period were influenced by Camille Corot, who tutored him. He and Corot shared a love of rural scenes painted from nature. It was by Corot that Pissarro was inspired to paint outdoors, also called "plein air" painting. Pissarro found Corot, along with the work of Gustave Courbet, to be "statements of pictorial truth," writes Rewald. He discussed their work often. Jean-François Millet was another whose work he admired, especially his "sentimental renditions of rural life".

=== Use of natural outdoor settings ===
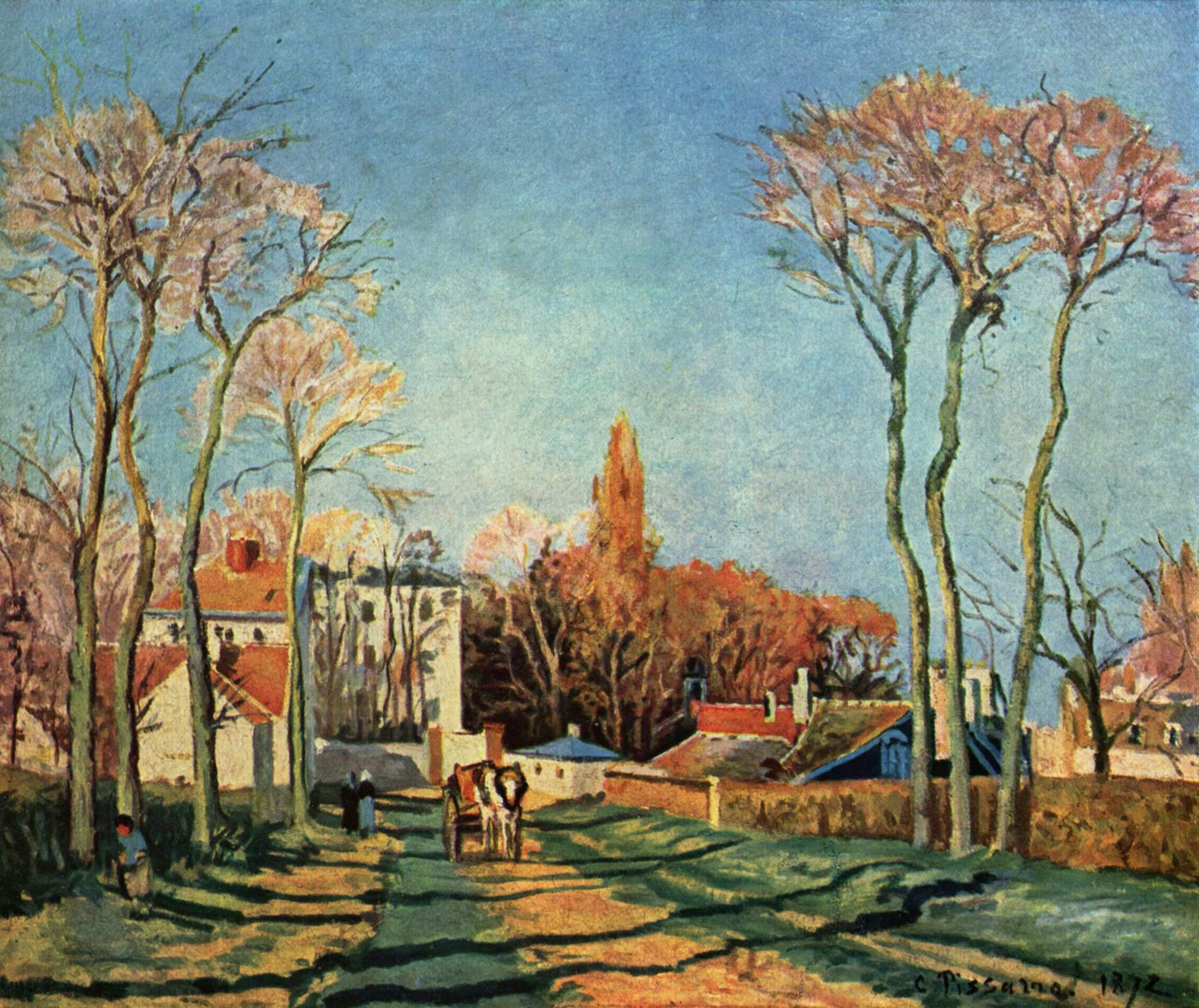
Entrée du village de Voisins, 1872. Musée d'Orsay, Paris

During this period Pissarro began to understand and appreciate the importance of expressing on canvas the beauties of nature without adulteration. After a year in Paris, he therefore began to leave the city and paint scenes in the countryside to capture the daily reality of village life. He found the French countryside to be "picturesque", and worthy of being painted. It was still mostly agricultural and sometimes called the "golden age of the peasantry". Pissarro later explained the technique of painting outdoors to a student:

"Work at the same time upon sky, water, branches, ground, keeping everything going on an equal basis and unceasingly rework until you have got it. Paint generously and unhesitatingly, for it is best not to lose the first impression."

Corot would complete his paintings back in his studio, often revising them according to his preconceptions. Pissarro, however, preferred to finish his paintings outdoors, often at one sitting, which gave his work a more realistic feel. As a result, his art was sometimes criticised as being "vulgar," because he painted what he saw: "rutted and edged hodgepodge of bushes, mounds of earth, and trees in various stages of development." According to one source, such details were equivalent to today's art showing garbage cans or beer bottles on the side of a street. This difference in style created disagreements between Pissarro and Corot.

=== With Monet, Cézanne, and Guillaumin ===
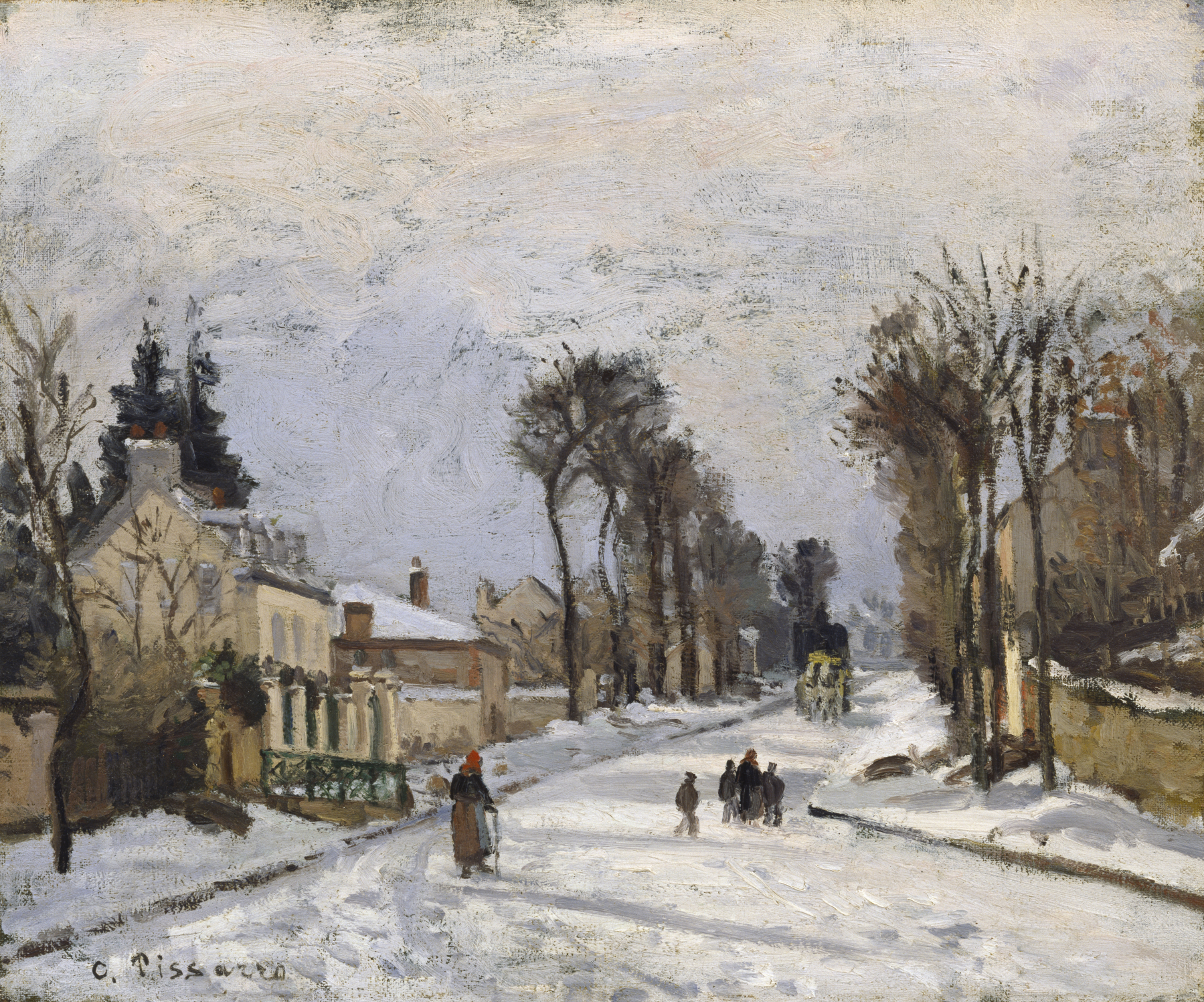
In 1869 Pissarro settled in Louveciennes and would often paint the road to Versailles in various seasons. Walters Art Museum.

In 1859, while attending the free school, the Académie Suisse, Pissarro became friends with a number of younger artists who likewise chose to paint in the more realistic style. Among them were Claude Monet, Armand Guillaumin and Paul Cézanne. What they shared in common was their dissatisfaction with the dictates of the Salon. Cézanne's work had been mocked at the time by the others in the school, and, writes Rewald, in his later years Cézanne "never forgot the sympathy and understanding with which Pissarro encouraged him." As a part of the group, Pissarro was comforted from knowing he was not alone, and that others similarly struggled with their art.

Pissarro agreed with the group about the importance of portraying individuals in natural settings, and expressed his dislike of any artifice or grandeur in his works, despite what the Salon demanded for its exhibits. In 1863 almost all of the group's paintings were rejected by the Salon, and French Emperor Napoleon III instead decided to place their paintings in a separate exhibit hall, the Salon des Refusés. However, only works of Pissarro and Cézanne were included, and the separate exhibit brought a hostile response from both the officials of the Salon and the public.

In 1864, Pissarro was accepted to the official Salon for the first time, and in subsequent Salon exhibits of 1865 and 1866, Pissarro acknowledged his influences from Melbye and Corot, whom he listed as his masters in the catalogue. In the exhibition of 1868, however, he no longer credited other artists as an influence, in effect declaring his independence as a painter. This was noted at the time by art critic and author Émile Zola, who offered his opinion:

"Camille Pissarro is one of the three or four true painters of this day ... I have rarely encountered a technique that is so sure."

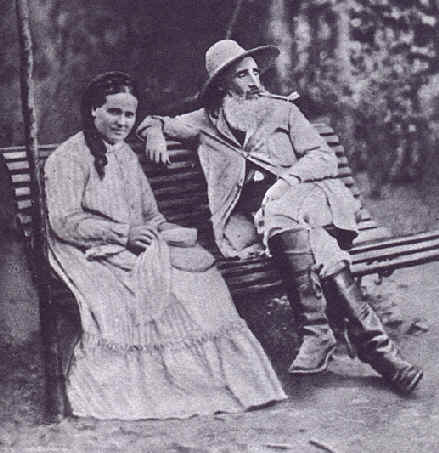
Camille Pissarro and his wife, Julie Vellay, 1877, Pontoise

Another writer tries to describe elements of Pissarro's style:

"The brightness of his palette envelops objects in atmosphere ... He paints the smell of the earth."

And though, on orders from the hanging Committee and the Marquis de Chennevières, Pissarro's paintings of Pontoise for example had been skyed, hung near the ceiling, this did not prevent Jules-Antoine Castagnary from noting that the qualities of his paintings had been observed by art lovers. At the age of thirty-eight, Pissarro had begun to win himself a reputation as a landscapist to rival Corot and Daubigny.

In the late 1860s or early 1870s, Pissarro became fascinated with Japanese prints, which influenced his desire to experiment in new compositions. He described the art to his son Lucien:

"It is marvelous. This is what I see in the art of this astonishing people ... nothing that leaps to the eye, a calm, a grandeur, an extraordinary unity, a rather subdued radiance ..."

=== Marriage and children ===
In 1871 in Croydon, England, he married his mother's maid, Julie Vellay (1838–1926), a vineyard grower's daughter, with whom he had seven children, six of whom would become painters: Lucien Pissarro (1863–1944), Georges Henri Manzana Pissarro (1871–1961), Félix Pissarro (1874–1897), Ludovic-Rodo Pissarro (1878–1952), Jeanne Bonin-Pissarro (1881–1948), and Paul-Émile Pissarro (1884–1972). They lived outside Paris in Pontoise and later in Louveciennes, both of which places inspired many of his paintings including scenes of village life, along with rivers, woods, and people at work. From 1884 they lived at Éragny-sur-Epte, where Pissarro lived for the remainder of his life. The house and its surrounding landscape became recurring subjects of his later work. He also kept in touch with the other artists of his earlier group, especially Monet, Renoir, Cézanne, and Frédéric Bazille.

=== Political thought ===
Pissarro was involved in anarchist circles and held strong views of egalitarianism. Pissarro was a subscriber to the radical anarchist publication Le Révolté and was in consistent communication with leading anarchist theorizer Jean Grave as well as fellow anarchist artists such as Paul Signac and Henri-Edmond Cross. His political philosophies also motivated some of his art. For instance, in 1889, Pissarro created an album of 30 drawings titled Turpitudes sociales, using a style of caricature and allegory to critique modern societal issues. The purpose of the album was political, Pissarro created the album as a gift for his niece aiming to solidify her anarchist tendencies.

== The London years ==
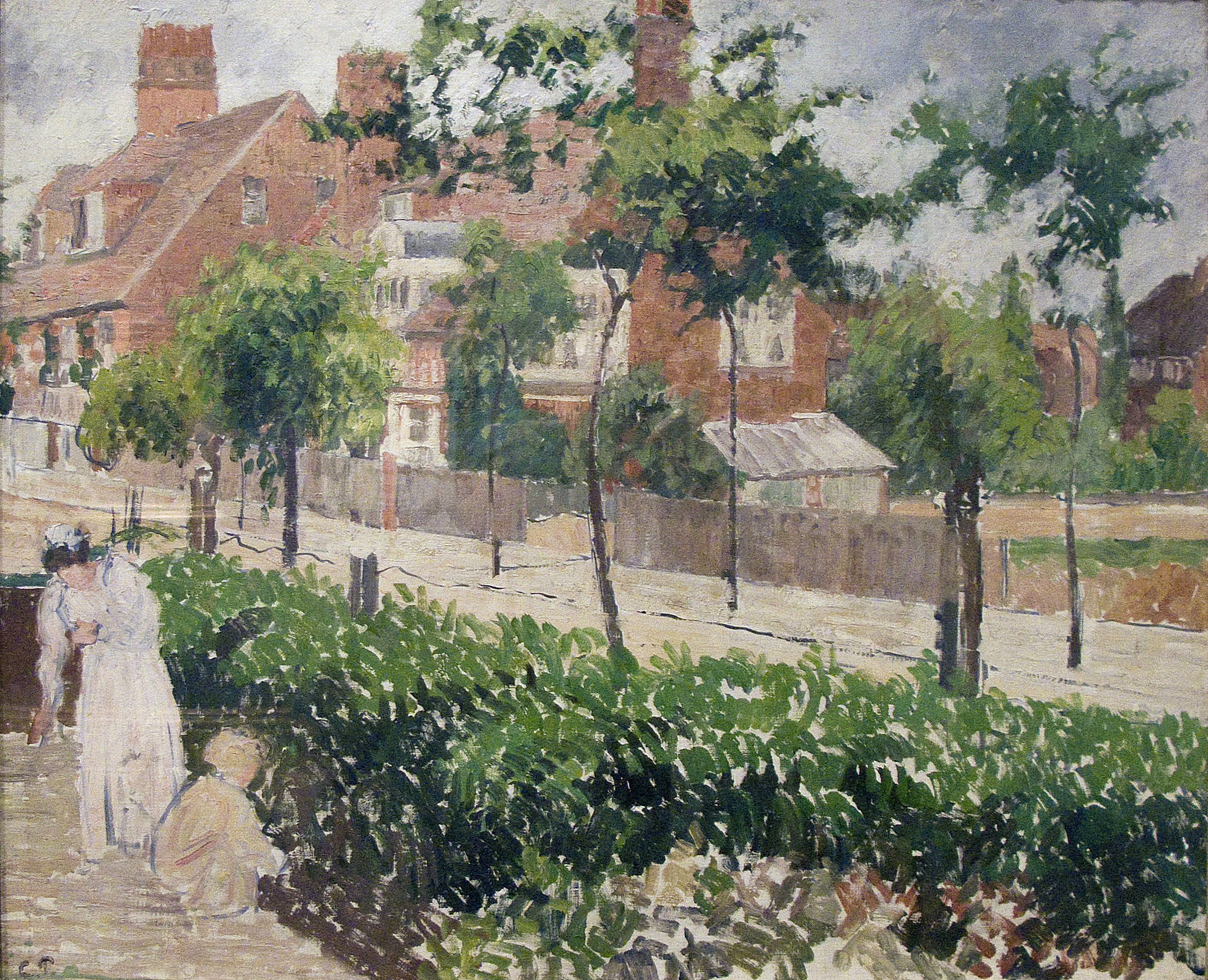
Bath Road, London, 1897 Ashmolean Museum, Oxford.

After the outbreak of the Franco-Prussian War of 1870–71, having only Danish nationality and being unable to join the army, he moved his family to Norwood, then a village on the edge of London. However, his style of painting, which was a forerunner of what was later called "Impressionism", did not do well. He wrote to his friend, Théodore Duret, that "my painting doesn't catch on, not at all ..."

Pissarro met the Paris art dealer Paul Durand-Ruel, in London, who became the dealer who helped sell his art for most of his life. Durand-Ruel put him in touch with Monet who was likewise in London during this period. They both viewed the work of British landscape artists John Constable and J. M. W. Turner, which confirmed their belief that their style of open air painting gave the truest depiction of light and atmosphere, an effect that they felt could not be achieved in the studio alone. Pissarro's paintings also began to take on a more spontaneous look, with loosely blended brushstrokes and areas of impasto, giving more depth to the work.

=== Paintings ===
Through the paintings Pissarro completed at this time, he records Sydenham and the Norwoods at a time when they were just recently connected by railways, but prior to the expansion of suburbia. One of the largest of these paintings is a view of St. Bartholomew's Church at Lawrie Park Avenue, commonly known as The Avenue, Sydenham, in the collection of the National Gallery in London. Twelve oil paintings date from his stay in Upper Norwood and are listed and illustrated in the catalogue raisonné prepared jointly by his fifth child Ludovic-Rodolphe Pissarro and Lionello Venturi and published in 1939. These paintings include Lower Norwood Under Snow, and Lordship Lane Station, views of The Crystal Palace relocated from Hyde Park, Dulwich College, Sydenham Hill, All Saints Church Upper Norwood, and a lost painting of St. Stephen's Church.

Returning to France, Pissarro lived in Pontoise from 1872 to 1884. In 1890 he again visited England and painted some ten scenes of central London. He came back again in 1892, painting in Kew Gardens and Kew Green, and also in 1897, when he produced several oils described as being of Bedford Park, Chiswick, but in fact all being of the nearby Stamford Brook area except for one of Bath Road, which runs from Stamford Brook along the south edge of Bedford Park.

== French Impressionism ==
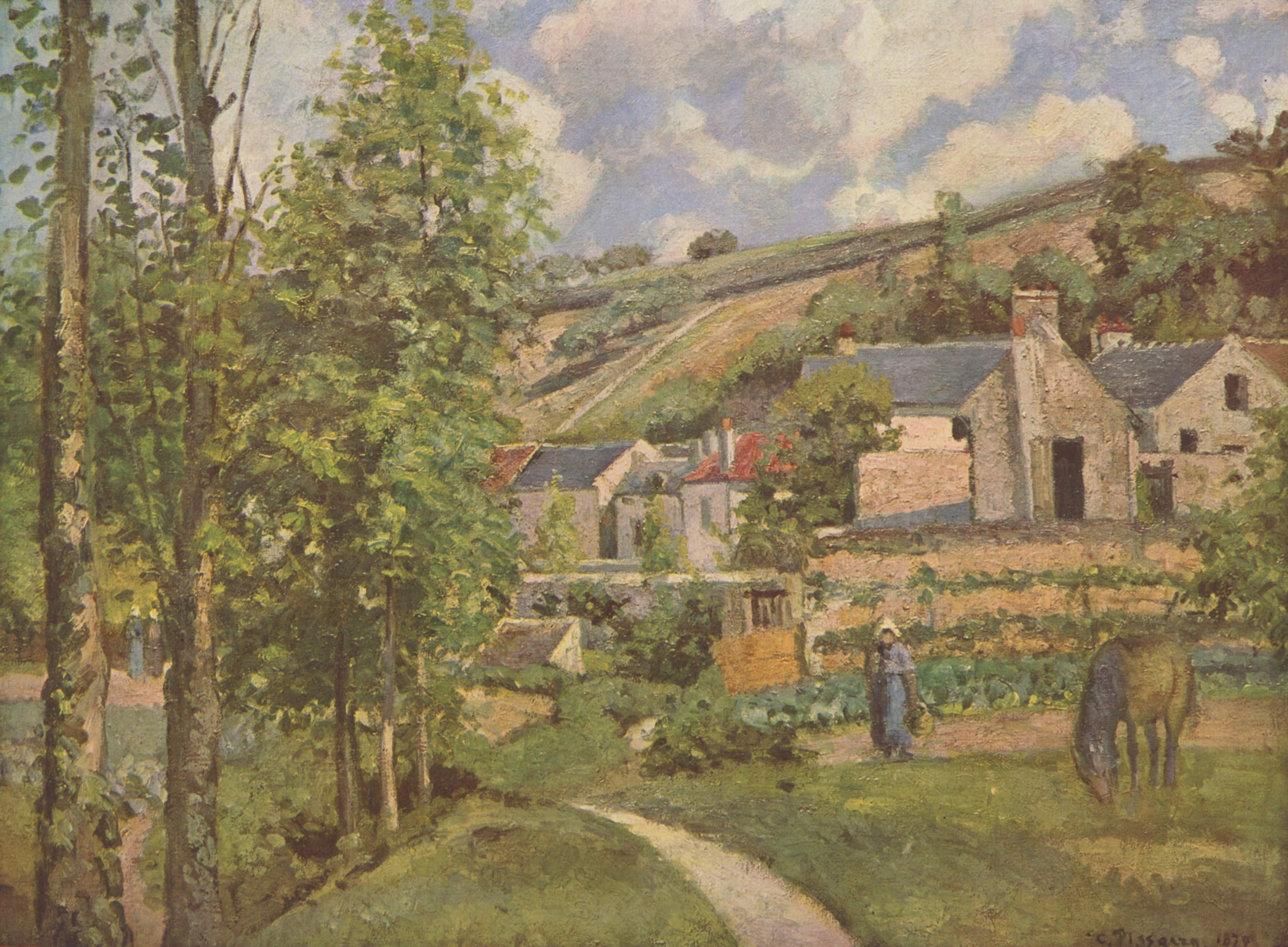
Landscape at Pontoise, 1874

When Pissarro returned to his home in France after the war, he discovered that of the 1,500 paintings he had done over 20 years, which he was forced to leave behind when he moved to London, only 40 remained. The rest had been damaged or destroyed by the soldiers, who often used them as floor mats outside in the mud to keep their boots clean. It is assumed that many of those lost were done in the Impressionist style he was then developing, thereby "documenting the birth of Impressionism." Armand Silvestre, a critic, went so far as to call Pissarro "basically the inventor of this [Impressionist] painting"; however, Pissarro's role in the Impressionist movement was "less that of the great man of ideas than that of the good counselor and appeaser ..." "Monet ... could be seen as the guiding force."

He soon reestablished his friendships with the other Impressionist artists of his earlier group, including Cézanne, Monet, Manet, Bacon, Renoir, and Degas. Pissarro now expressed his opinion to the group that he wanted an alternative to the Salon so their group could display their own unique styles.

To assist in that endeavour, in 1873 he helped establish a separate collective, called the "Société Anonyme des Artistes, Peintres, Sculpteurs et Graveurs," which included fifteen artists. Pissarro created the group's first charter and became the "pivotal" figure in establishing and holding the group together. One writer noted that with his prematurely grey beard, the forty-three-year-old Pissarro was regarded as a "wise elder and father figure" by the group. Yet he was able to work alongside the other artists on equal terms due to his youthful temperament and creativity. Another writer said of him that "he has unchanging spiritual youth and the look of an ancestor who remained a young man".

=== Impressionist exhibitions that shocked the critics ===
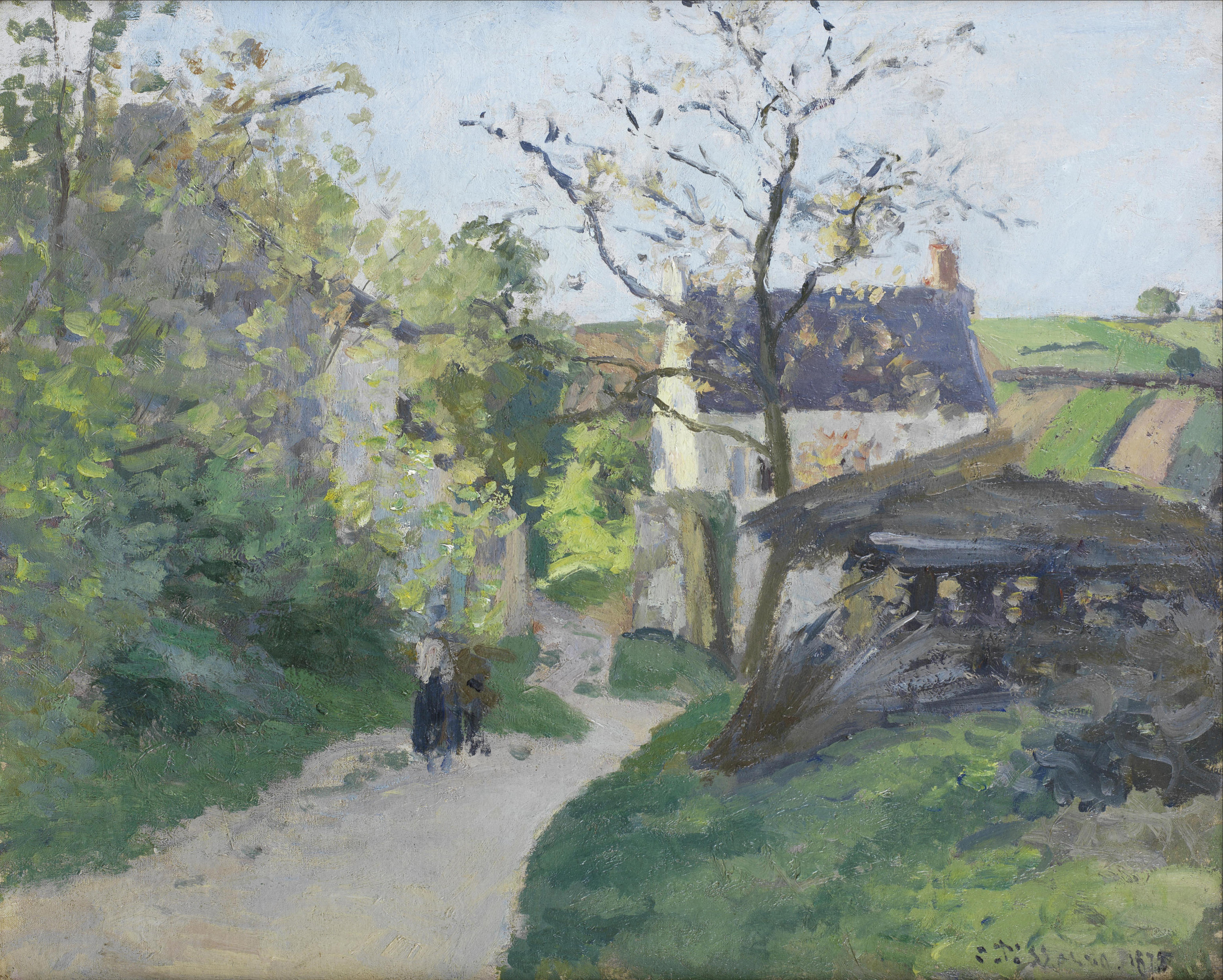
Le grand noyer à l'Hermitage, 1875. The new manner of painting was too sketchy and looked incomplete.

The following year, in 1874, the group held their First Impressionist Exhibition, which shocked and "horrified" the critics, who primarily appreciated only scenes portraying religious, historical, or mythological settings. They found fault with the Impressionist paintings on many grounds:

- The subject matter was considered "vulgar" and "commonplace," with scenes of street people going about their everyday lives. Pissarro's paintings, for instance, showed scenes of muddy, dirty, and unkempt settings;
- The manner of painting was too sketchy and looked incomplete, especially compared to the traditional styles of the period. The use of visible and expressive brushwork by all the artists was considered an insult to the craft of traditional artists, who often spent weeks on their work. Here, the paintings were often done in one sitting and the paints were applied wet-on-wet;
- The use of color by the Impressionists relied on new theories they developed, such as having shadows painted with the reflected light of surrounding, and often unseen, objects.

=== A "revolutionary" style ===
Orchard in Bloom, Louveciennes, 1872

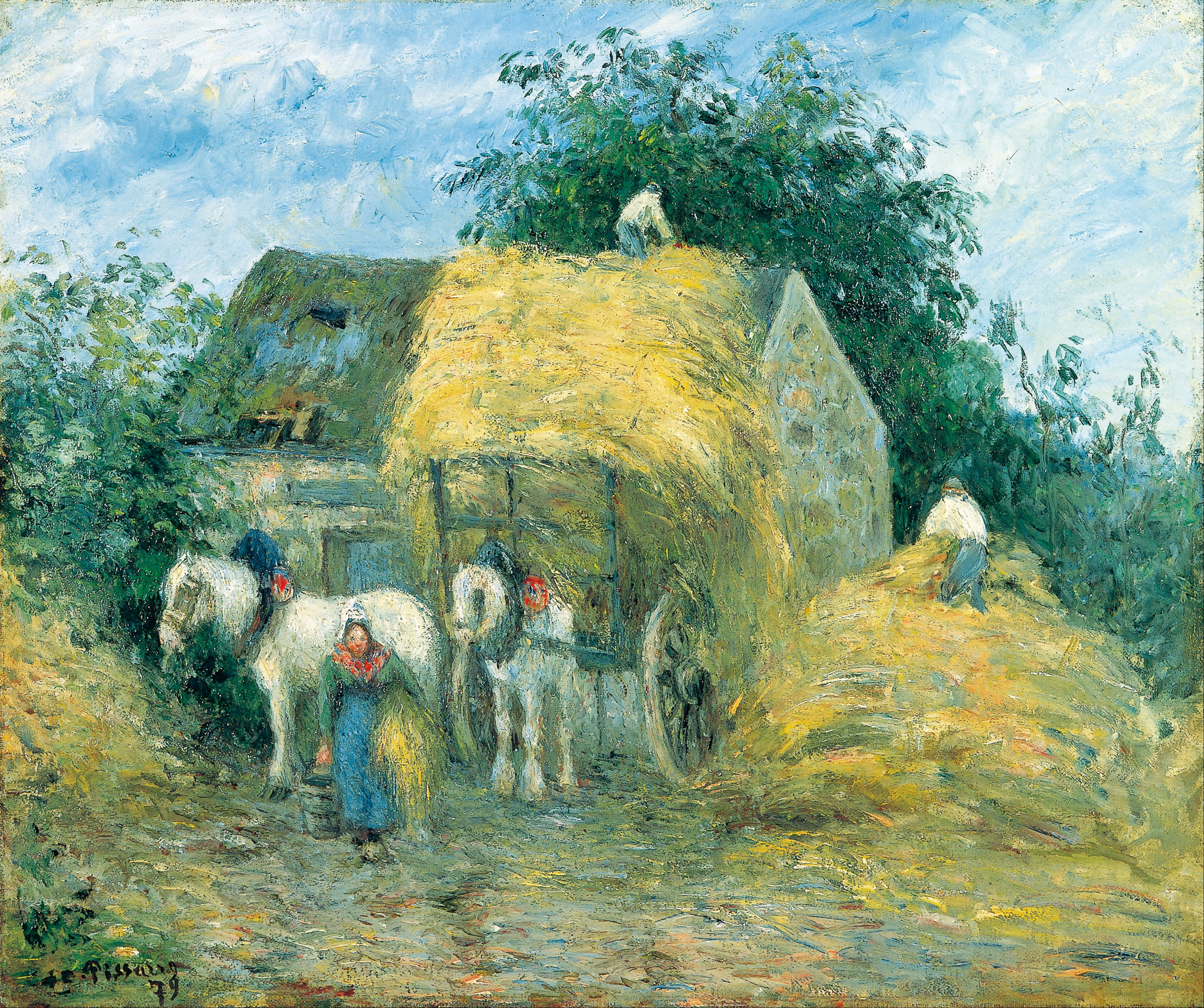
The Hay Cart, Montfoucault, 1879

Pissarro showed five of his paintings, all landscapes, at the exhibit, and again Émile Zola praised his art and that of the others. In the Impressionist exhibit of 1876, however, art critic Albert Wolff complained in his review, "Try to make M. Pissarro understand that trees are not violet, that sky is not the color of fresh butter ..." Journalist and art critic Octave Mirbeau on the other hand, writes, "Camille Pissarro has been a revolutionary through the revitalized working methods with which he has endowed painting". According to Rewald, Pissarro had taken on an attitude more simple and natural than the other artists. He writes:

"Rather than glorifying—consciously or not—the rugged existence of the peasants, he placed them without any 'pose' in their habitual surroundings, thus becoming an objective chronicler of one of the many facets of contemporary life."

In later years, Cézanne also recalled this period and referred to Pissarro as "the first Impressionist". In 1906, a few years after Pissarro's death, Cézanne, then 67 and a role model for the new generation of artists, paid Pissarro a debt of gratitude by having himself listed in an exhibition catalogue as "Paul Cézanne, pupil of Pissarro".

Pissarro, Degas, and American impressionist Mary Cassatt planned a journal of their original prints in the late 1870s, a project that nevertheless came to nothing when Degas withdrew. Art historian and the artist's great-grandson Joachim Pissarro notes that they "professed a passionate disdain for the Salons and refused to exhibit at them." Together they shared an "almost militant resolution" against the Salon, and through their later correspondences it is clear that their mutual admiration "was based on a kinship of ethical as well as aesthetic concerns".

Cassatt had befriended Degas and Pissarro years earlier when she joined Pissarro's newly formed French Impressionist group and gave up opportunities to exhibit in the United States. She and Pissarro were often treated as "two outsiders" by the Salon since neither were French or had become French citizens. However, she was "fired up with the cause" of promoting Impressionism and looked forward to exhibiting "out of solidarity with her new friends". Towards the end of the 1890s she began to distance herself from the Impressionists, avoiding Degas at times as she did not have the strength to defend herself against his "wicked tongue". Instead, she came to prefer the company of "the gentle Camille Pissarro", with whom she could speak frankly about the changing attitudes toward art. She once described him as a teacher "that could have taught the stones to draw correctly."

=== Other mediums ===
Pissarro was also known to experiment with lithographs, woodblock engravings, and original techniques in multicolor etching and monotype. Art historian Cora Michael notes that "of the Impressionists, Pissarro was perhaps the one most devoted to printmaking and…approached prints from the point of view of an avant-garde artist." In the 1880s to early 1890s, Pissarro returned to his studio in Pontoise, where he worked with many different print mediums to produce works such as "Vegetable Market at Pontoise" and "The Road to Rouen: The Hills of Pontoise".

== Éragny-sur-Epte ==
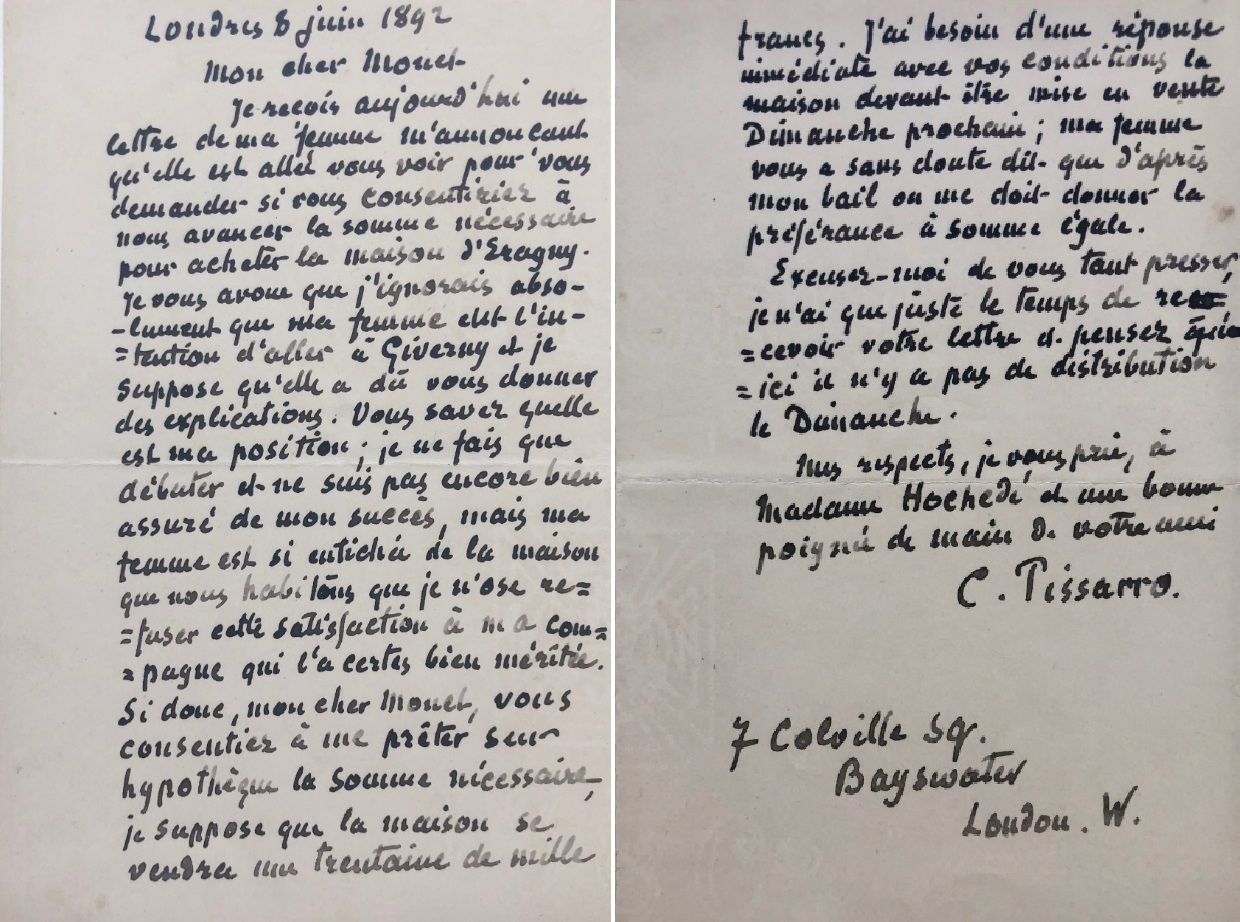
Letter from Pissarro to Claude Monet, 8 June 1892, concerning the purchase of the Éragny property.

In April 1884, Pissarro and his family settled at Éragny-sur-Epte, a small village near Gisors, where he would live for the remainder of his life. Writing to his son Lucien on 1 March 1884, Pissarro described the house as "superb", with a garden and meadows, and expressed particular enthusiasm for the surrounding countryside.

The house, garden, orchard, meadows, agricultural workers and the countryside around Éragny became recurring subjects during the final nineteen years of Pissarro's career. He also repeatedly painted views across the Epte valley towards the neighbouring village of Bazincourt-sur-Epte. Museum research has identified several landscapes painted from viewpoints on the property and, later, from the studio created in the barn.

=== Neo-Impressionism at Éragny ===
Shortly after settling at Éragny, Pissarro began to reconsider aspects of his Impressionist technique. In 1885 he came into close contact with Georges Seurat and Paul Signac, whose approach was based on the juxtaposition of small strokes or dots of relatively pure colour intended to blend optically when viewed from a distance.

Between about 1885 and 1888 Pissarro experimented extensively with this more systematic technique, later associated with Neo-Impressionism and Pointillism. Éragny and its rural surroundings supplied many of the subjects for these experiments, including harvests, peasants at work, gardens and village landscapes.

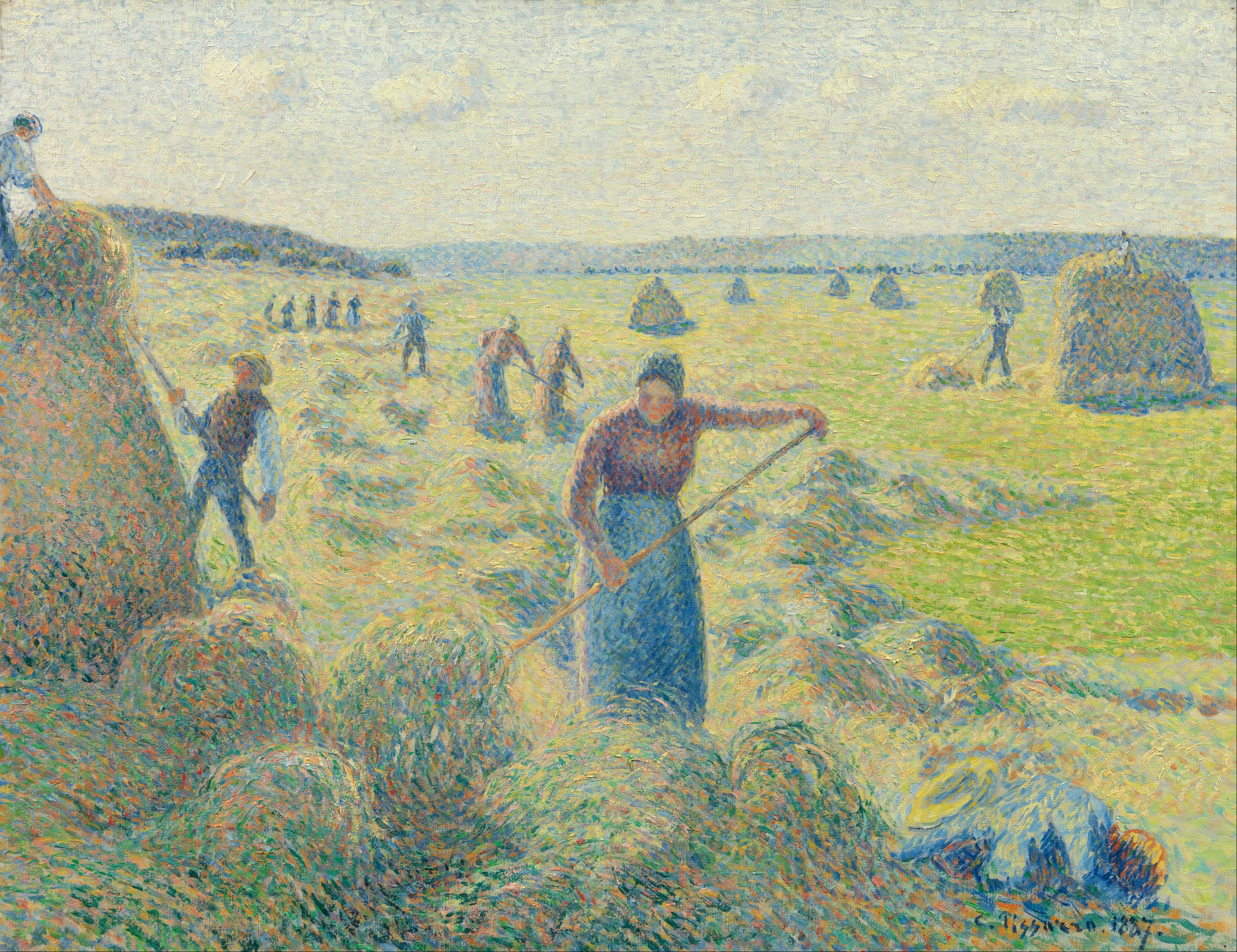
Camille Pissarro - La Récolte des Foins, Éragny - Google Art Project

At the eighth and final Impressionist exhibition in 1886, Pissarro showed works influenced by the new method in a separate grouping alongside Seurat, Signac and his son Lucien. The marked change in his technique attracted considerable attention from contemporary critics. Art historian Joachim Pissarro later emphasized his willingness continually to revise his artistic position and accept new challenges.

Pissarro regarded Neo-Impressionism not as a rejection of Impressionism but as a possible continuation of its search for colour and light. His adoption of the new approach was nevertheless unusual among the older Impressionists and placed him in direct contact with a younger generation of artists.

His interest in rural labour also continued during these years. Rather than idealising peasant life, Pissarro repeatedly represented people working in fields, gardens and farmyards, subjects that had interested him since much earlier in his career.

=== Abandoning Neo-Impressionism ===
By the end of the 1880s, Pissarro increasingly found the Neo-Impressionist method too restrictive. After several years of experimentation he abandoned the systematic division of colour, explaining that the method made it difficult for him to respond freely to changing effects of nature, movement and individual sensation.

He nevertheless retained lessons from the experiment, particularly a heightened attention to colour relationships and a more structured handling of the surface. His subsequent Éragny paintings combined these experiences with a freer manner of painting.

The years at Éragny therefore encompass both Pissarro's most sustained engagement with Neo-Impressionism and his eventual return to a more flexible personal style.

=== Purchase of the property and the studio ===
The Pissarros initially rented the Éragny property. When it was offered for sale in 1892, Pissarro sought financial assistance from his longtime friend Claude Monet, who lived nearby at Giverny. Monet agreed to make up to 15,000 francs available, helping Pissarro and his wife Julie acquire the house. Referring to their long friendship, Monet wrote, "We are old enough friends to do each other favors."

In 1893, Pissarro substantially altered the barn bordering the garden to create a large studio on its upper floor. His correspondence with Lucien documents the progress of the work in detail. The north wall was fitted with a large arched glazed opening approximately three metres wide, which Pissarro described as providing "beautiful light"; another opening faced west over the orchard and towards Bazincourt. Access to the upper floor was provided by a covered exterior staircase.

The elevated studio gave Pissarro new viewpoints over the orchard, meadows and Epte valley. Research by the Art Institute of Chicago and the Nelson-Atkins Museum of Art has linked a number of his later Éragny landscapes to views from these windows.

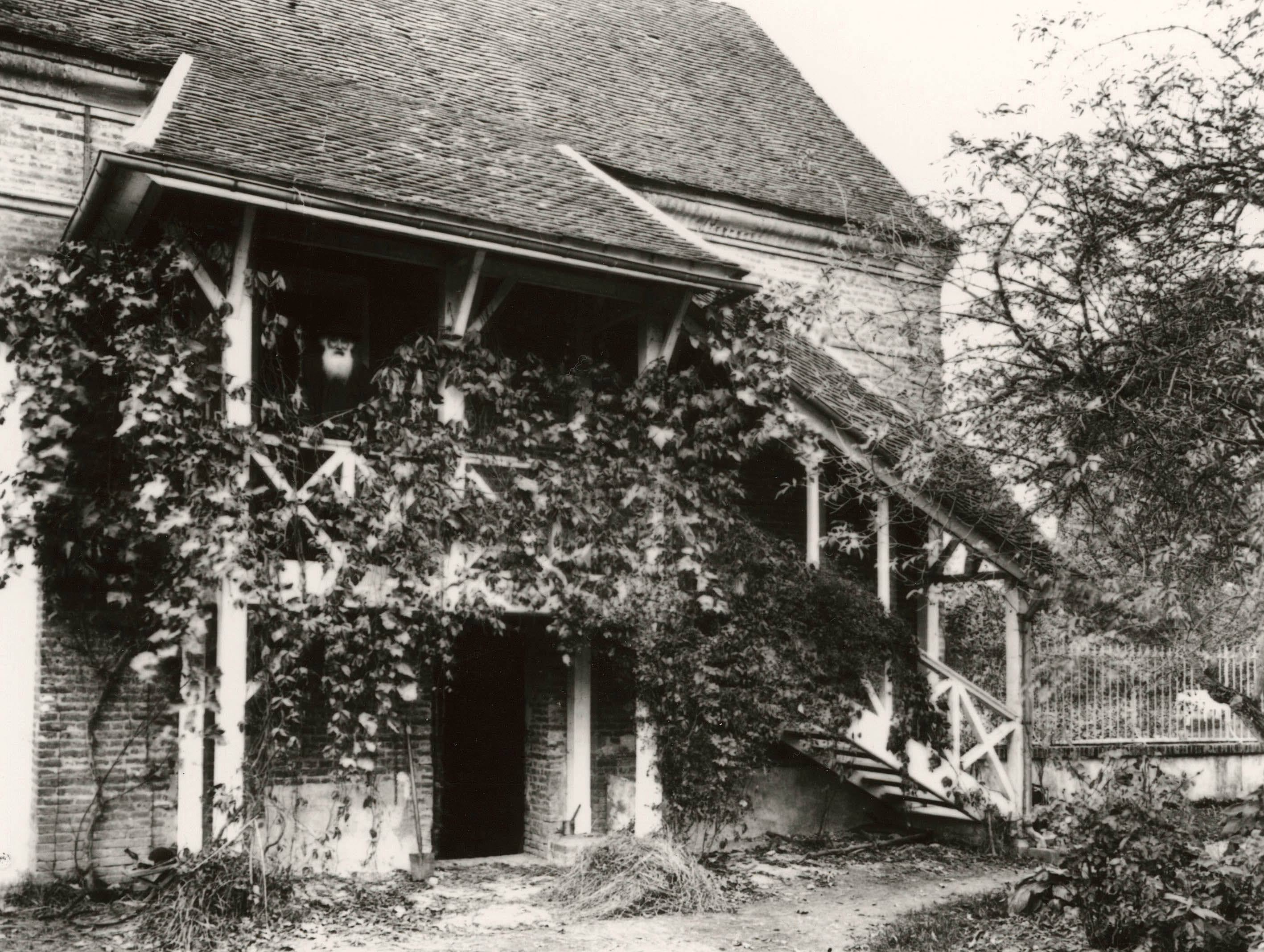
Camille Pissarro at the covered exterior staircase of his studio at Éragny-sur-Epte, c. 1900.

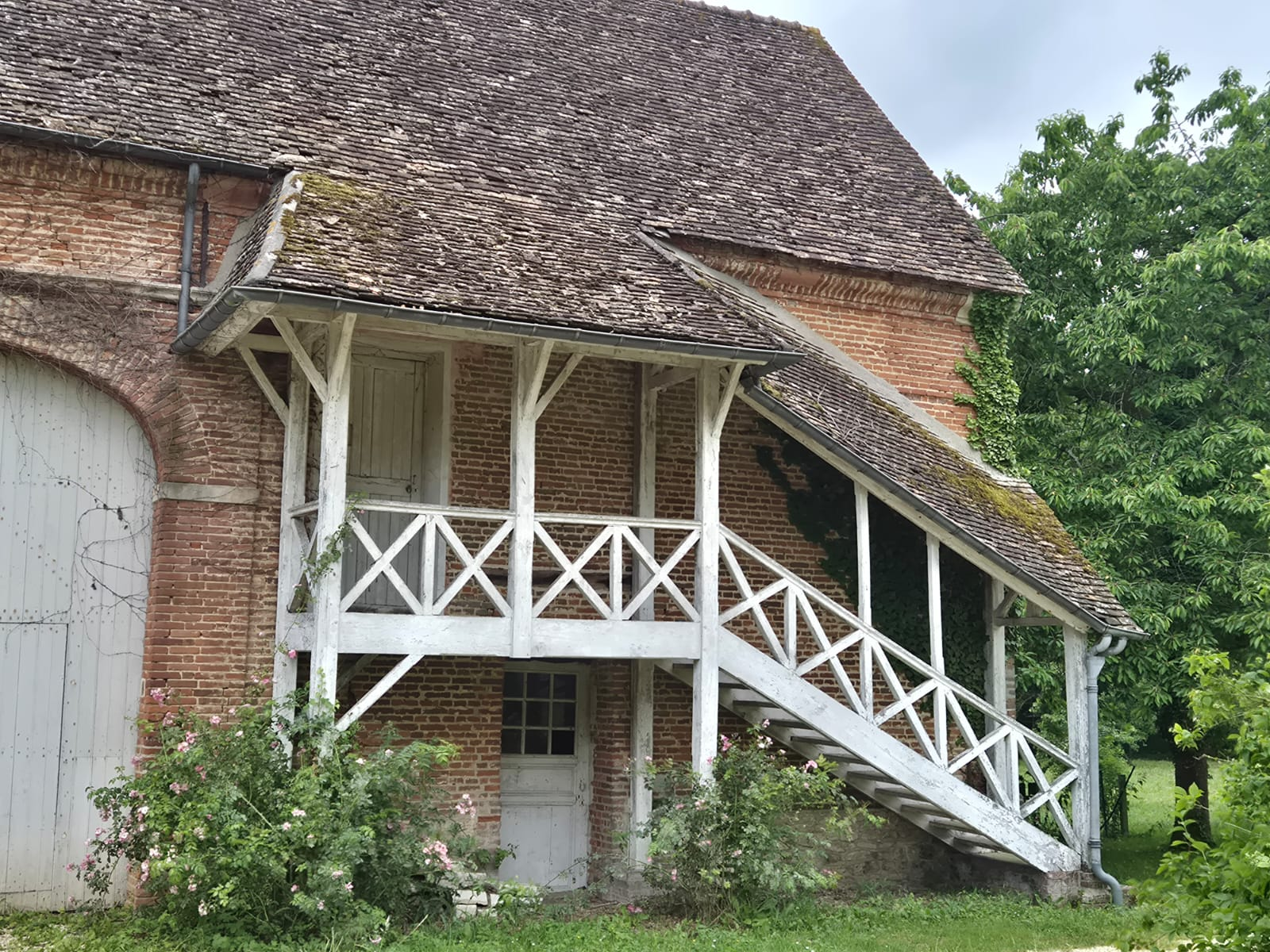
The same studio and covered exterior staircase in June 2026.

Historical and contemporary views of Camille Pissarro's studio at Éragny-sur-Epte.

The French Ministry of Culture records that the property consisted of a house, barn and orchard. It describes the studio and house at Éragny as an important site in the history of Impressionism and identifies the property as a lieu de mémoire. The studio and garden were registered as a French Monument historique on 1 July 1998.

=== Éragny in Pissarro's later work and legacy ===
Éragny remained Pissarro's principal home until his death in 1903. The property and surrounding landscape continued to provide subjects throughout the 1890s and early 1900s, including the garden, orchard, haymaking, apple harvesting, village views and scenes of agricultural work.

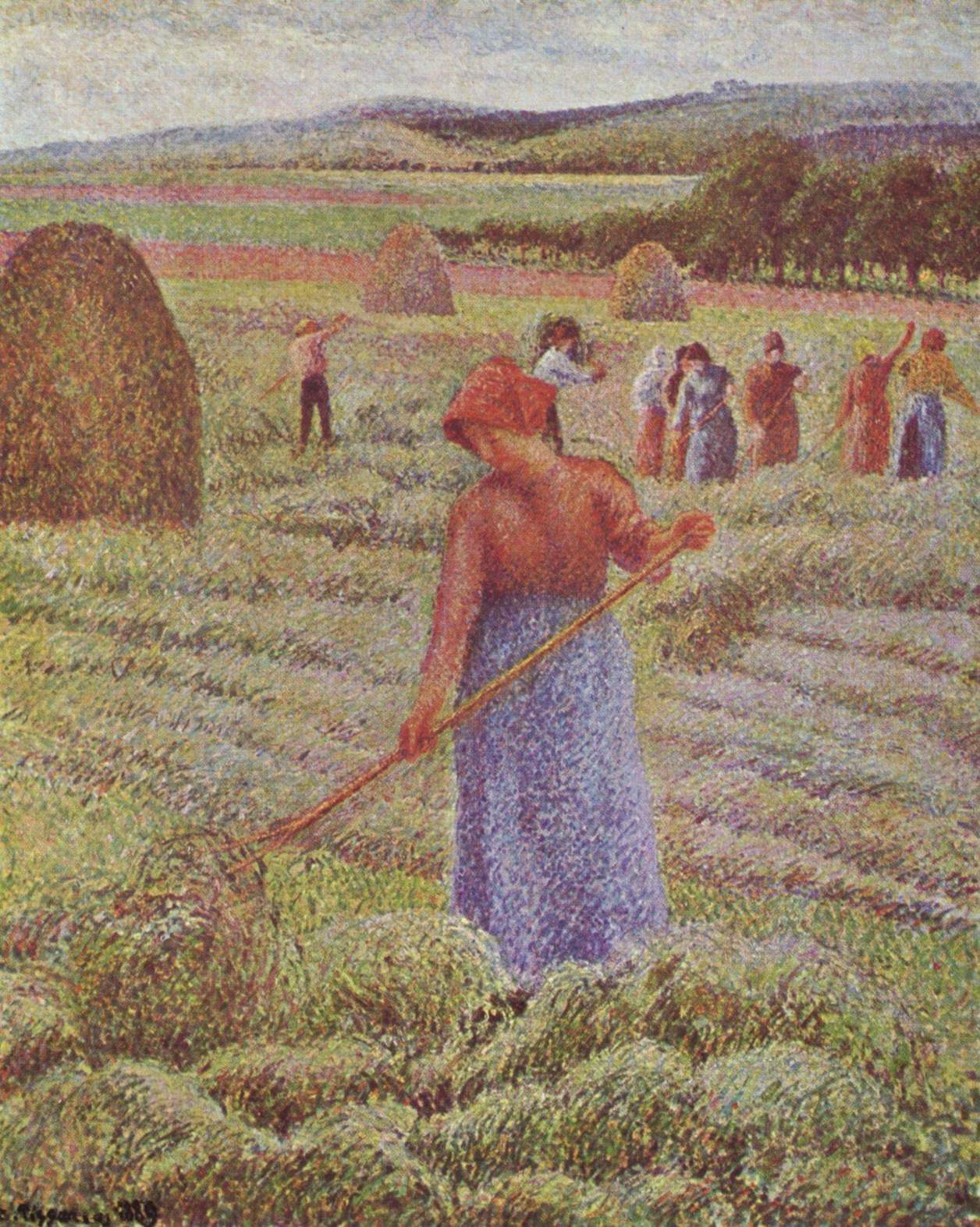
Hay Harvest at Éragny-sur-Epte, 1889.

Works produced during the Éragny years are now widely distributed among international museum and private collections. In 2017, the Musée du Luxembourg in Paris presented Pissarro in Eragny: Nature Regained, an exhibition devoted specifically to the final two decades of Pissarro's career. Curated by Richard Brettell and Joachim Pissarro, it brought together around one hundred paintings, drawings and prints made at Éragny between 1884 and 1903, together with family archives, from major museum and private collections worldwide.

Works from the Éragny period are held in collections including the Musée d'Orsay, the National Gallery, London, the Metropolitan Museum of Art, the National Gallery of Art, Washington, the Ashmolean Museum, Ordrupgaard and the National Gallery of Canada.

== Later years ==
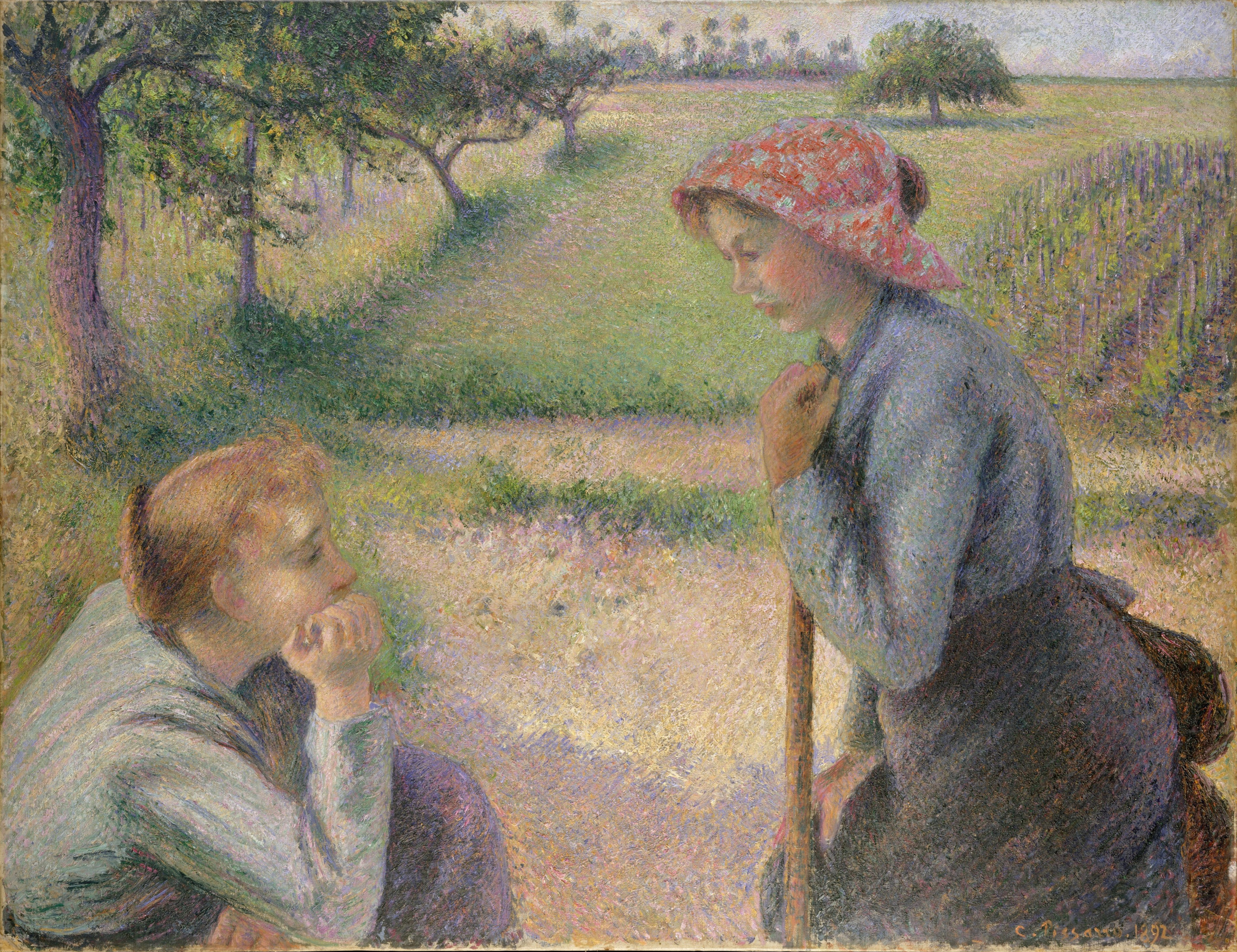
Two Young Peasant Women, 1891–92. Metropolitan Museum of Art

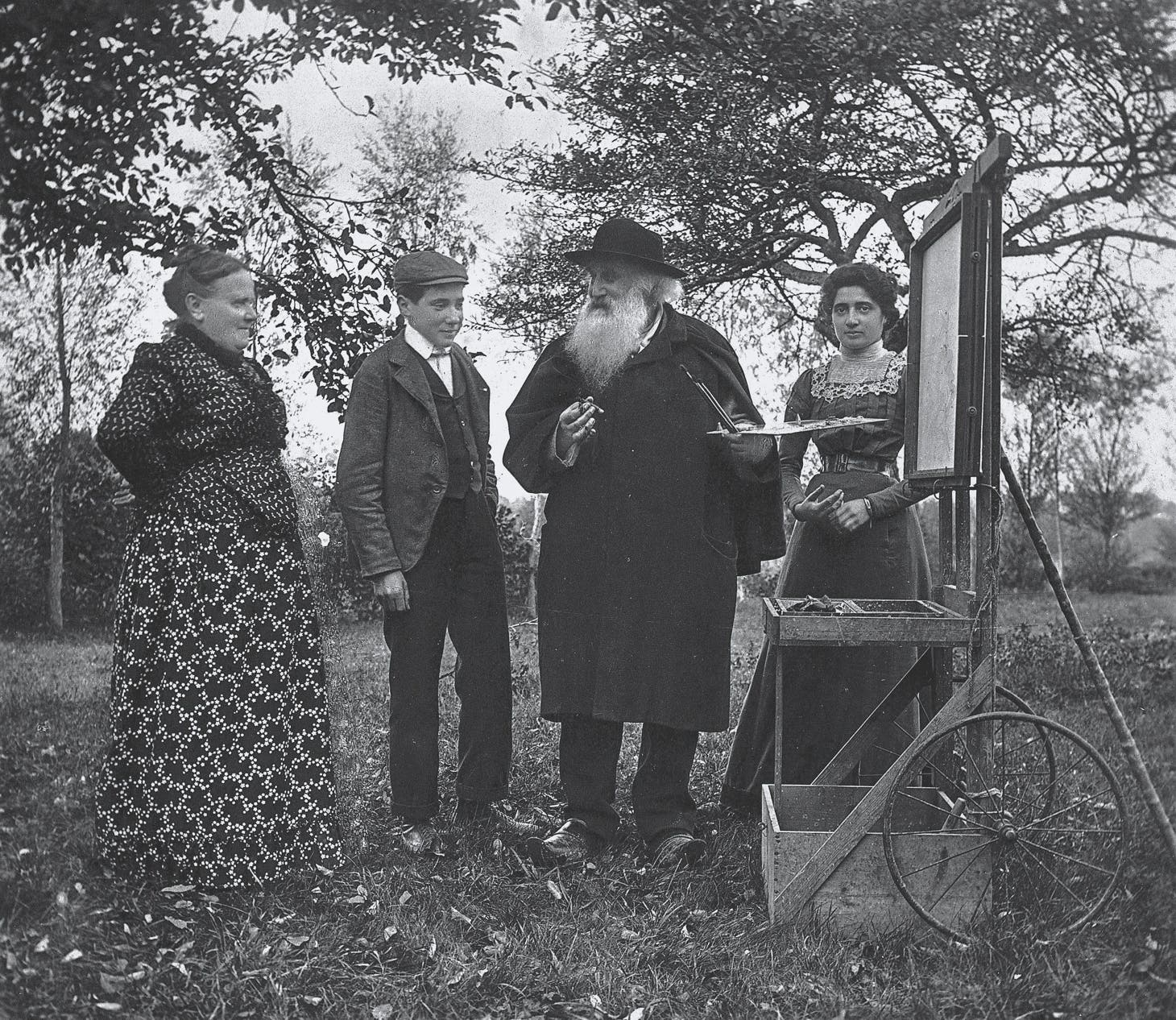
Pissarro with his family at his mobile easel, Éragny, 1901. Archives Musée Camille Pissarro

In his older age Pissarro suffered from a recurring eye infection that prevented him from working outdoors except in warm weather. As a result of this limitation, he began painting outdoor scenes while sitting at the window of hotel rooms, often choosing hotel rooms on upper levels to get a broader view. He moved around northern France and painted from hotels in Rouen, Paris, Le Havre and Dieppe. On his visits to London, he would do the same.

Pissarro died in Paris, from sepsis caused by a prostate abscess, on 13 November 1903, at the age of 73 and was buried in Père Lachaise Cemetery.

== Legacy and influence ==
Camille Pissarro, c. 1900

During the period Pissarro exhibited his works, art critic Armand Silvestre had called Pissarro the "most real and most naive member" of the Impressionist group. His work has also been described by art historian Diane Kelder as expressing "the same quiet dignity, sincerity, and durability that distinguished his person." She adds that "no member of the group did more to mediate the internecine disputes that threatened at times to break it apart, and no one was a more diligent proselytizer of the new painting."

According to Pissarro's son, Lucien, his father painted regularly with Cézanne beginning in 1872. He recalls that Cézanne walked a few miles to join Pissarro at various settings in Pontoise. While they shared ideas during their work, the younger Cézanne wanted to study the countryside through Pissarro's eyes, as he admired Pissarro's landscapes from the 1860s. Cézanne, although only nine years younger than Pissarro, said that "he was a father for me. A man to consult and a little like the good Lord."

Lucien Pissarro was taught painting by his father, and described him as a "splendid teacher, never imposing his personality on his pupil." Gauguin, who also studied under him, referred to Pissarro "as a force with which future artists would have to reckon". Art historian Diane Kelder notes that it was Pissarro who introduced Gauguin, who was then a young stockbroker studying to become an artist, to Degas and Cézanne. Gauguin, near the end of his career, wrote a letter to a friend in 1902, shortly before Pissarro's death:

"If we observe the totality of Pissarro's work, we find there, despite fluctuations, not only an extreme artistic will, never belied, but also an essentially intuitive, purebred art ... He was one of my masters and I do not deny him."

The American impressionist Mary Cassatt, who at one point lived in Paris to study art, and joined his Impressionist group, noted that he was "such a teacher that he could have taught the stones to draw correctly."

Caribbean author and scholar Derek Walcott based his book-length poem, Tiepolo's Hound (2000), on Pissarro's life.

Camille Pissarro is a pivotal character in the historical fiction novels, The Dream Collector, Books I & II by R.w. Meek, depicting his major role among the Impressionists and his open-mindedness toward the Post-Impressionist art of Georges Seurat, Paul Gauguin and Vincent van Gogh.

=== The legacy of Nazi-looted Pissarros ===
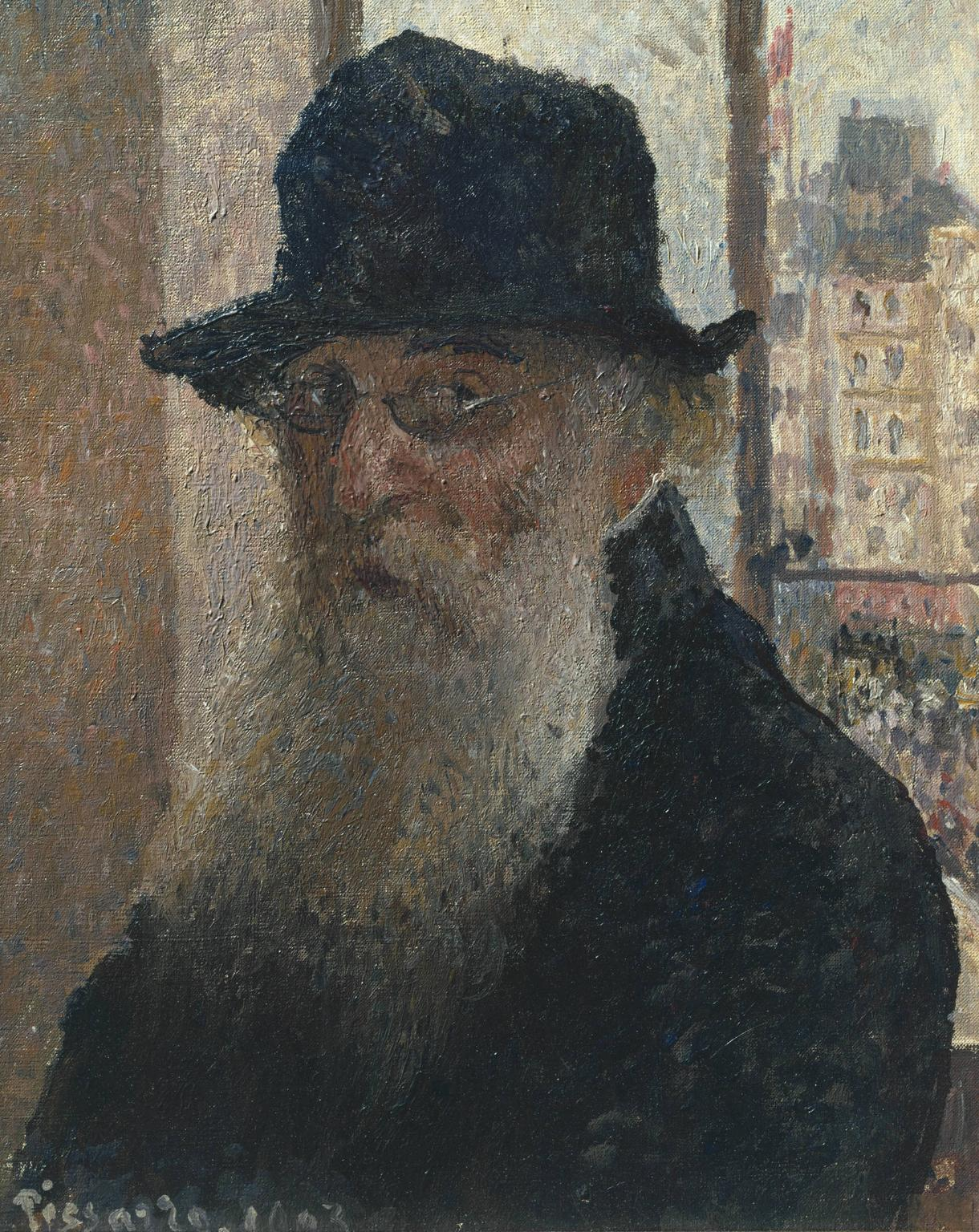
Self-portrait, 1903. Tate Gallery, London

During the early 1930s throughout Europe, Jewish owners of numerous fine art masterpieces found themselves forced to give up or sell off their collections for minimal prices due to anti-Jewish laws created by the new Nazi regime. Many Jews were forced to flee Germany starting in 1933, and then, as the Nazis expanded their hold over all of Europe, Austria, France, Holland, Poland, Italy and other countries. The Nazis created special looting organizations like the Reichsleiter Rosenberg Taskforce whose mission it was to seize Jewish property notably valuable artworks. When those forced into exile or deported to extermination camps owned valuables, including artwork, they were often sold to finance the Nazi war effort, sent to Hitler's personal museum, traded or seized by officials for personal gain. Several artworks by Pissarro were looted from their Jewish owners in Germany, France and elsewhere by the Nazis.

In the decades after World War II, many art masterpieces were found on display in various galleries and museums in Europe and the United States, often with false provenances and labels missing. Some, as a result of legal action, were later returned to the families of the original owners. Many of the recovered paintings were then donated to the same or other museums as a gift.

Pissarro's Shepherdess Bringing Home the Sheep ("La Bergère Rentrant des Moutons") was looted from the Jewish art collectors Yvonne et Raoul Meyer in France in 1941 and transited via Switzerland and New York before entering the Fred Jones Jr Museum at the University of Oklahoma. In 2014, Meyer's daughter, Léonie-Noëlle Meyer filed a restitution claim which resulted in years of court battle. The lawsuit resulted in the recognition of Meyer's ownership and its transfer to France for five years, coupled with an agreement to shuttle the painting back and forth between Paris and Oklahoma every three years after that. However, in 2020 Meyer filed suit in a French court to challenge the accord. After Fred Jones Jr Museum sued Meyer requesting heavy financial penalties, the Holocaust survivor abandoned her effort to recover the Pissarro, saying, "I have no other choice.

Pissarro's Picking Peas (La Cueillette) was looted from Jewish businessman Simon Bauer, in addition to 92 other artworks seized in 1943 by the Vichy collaborationist regime in France.

Pissarro's Sower And Ploughman, was owned by Dr Henri Hinrichsen, a Jewish music publisher from Leipzig, until 11 January 1940, when he was forced to relinquish the painting to Hildebrand Gurlitt in Nazi-occupied Brussels, before being murdered in Auschwitz in September 1942.

Pissarro's "Le Quai Malaquais, Printemps", owned by German Jewish publisher Samuel Fischer, founder of the famous S. Fischer Verlag, passed through the hands of infamous Nazi art looter Bruno Lohse.

Le Boulevard de Montmartre, matinée de printemps, owned by Max Silberberg, a German Jewish industrialist whose renowned art collection was considered "one of the best in pre-war Germany", was seized and sold in a forced auction before Silberberg and his wife Johanna were murdered in Auschwitz. In 1999, the painting appeared in the Israel Museum in Jerusalem, its donor having been unaware of its pre-war provenance. Restituted to Silberberg's heir, it was sold in February 2014 at Sotheby's in London for £19.9M, nearly five times the previous record.

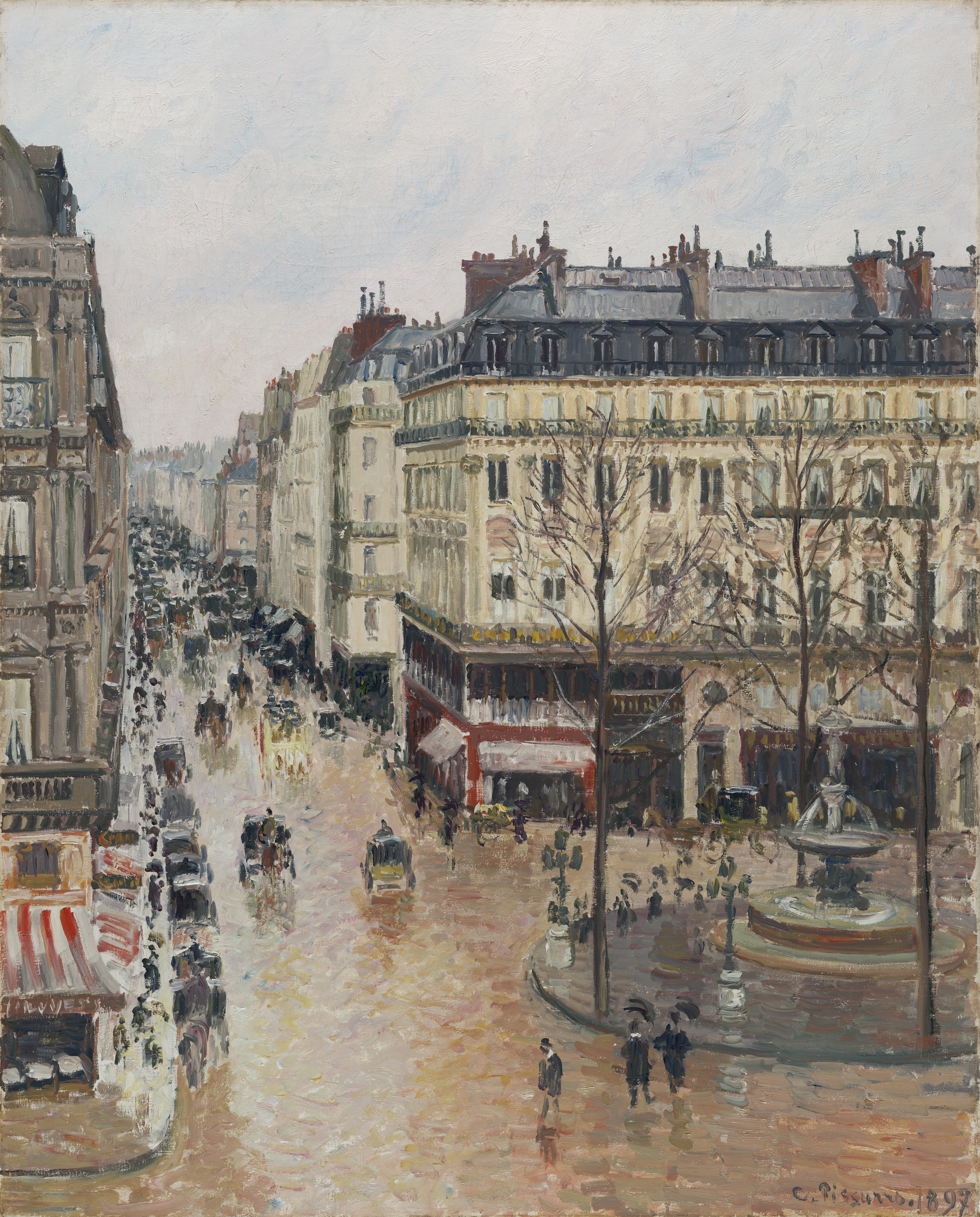
Rue Saint-Honoré in the Afternoon. Effect of Rain, 1897, Museo Thyssen-Bornemisza.

"Le Quai Malaquais, Printemps" was restituted in 2007 to an heir of Gottfried Bermann Fischer.

Pissarro's 1897 oil painting, Rue Saint-Honoré in the Afternoon. Effect of Rain, was discovered hanging at Madrid's government-owned museum, the Museo Thyssen-Bornemisza. In January 2011 the Spanish government denied a request by the US ambassador to return the painting. At the subsequent trial in Los Angeles, the court ruled that the Thyssen-Bornemisza Collection Foundation was the rightful owner. California's Attorney General Rob Bonta announced in November 2025 that the state would intervene in the case. In January 2012, Le Marché aux Poissons (The Fish Market), a color monotype, was returned after 30 years.

During his lifetime, Camille Pissarro sold few of his paintings. By the 21st century, however, his paintings were selling for millions. An auction record for the artist was set on 6 November 2007 at Christie's in New York, where a group of four paintings, Les Quatre Saisons (the Four Seasons), sold for $14,601,000 (estimate $12,000,000 – $18,000,000). In November 2009, Le Pont Boieldieu et la Gare d'Orléans, Rouen, Soleil sold for $7,026,500 at Sotheby's in New York. "Le Quai Malaquais, Printemps" auctioned in November 2009 for $1,850,000 ($2,154,000 with Christie's premium) under its new title, "Le Quai Malaquais et l'Institut".

In October 2021 Berlin's Alte Nationalgalerie restituted Pissarro's "A Square in La Roche-Guyon" (1867) to the heirs of Armand Dorville, a French Jewish art collector whose family was persecuted by the Nazis and whose paintings had been sold at a 1942 auction in Nice that was overseen by the Commissariat Général aux Questions Juives. The museum then purchased the Pissarro back.

In November 2026, a French court ruled on a dispute with Sotheby''s concerning the sale of “Darse de peche et bassin Duquesne” (“Fishing dock and Duquesne basin”). The decision stated "all successive sales of the disputed painting since its spoliation" to be null and void and ordered its restitution to the heirs of Salomon Flavian.

Boulevard Montmartre cityscape series

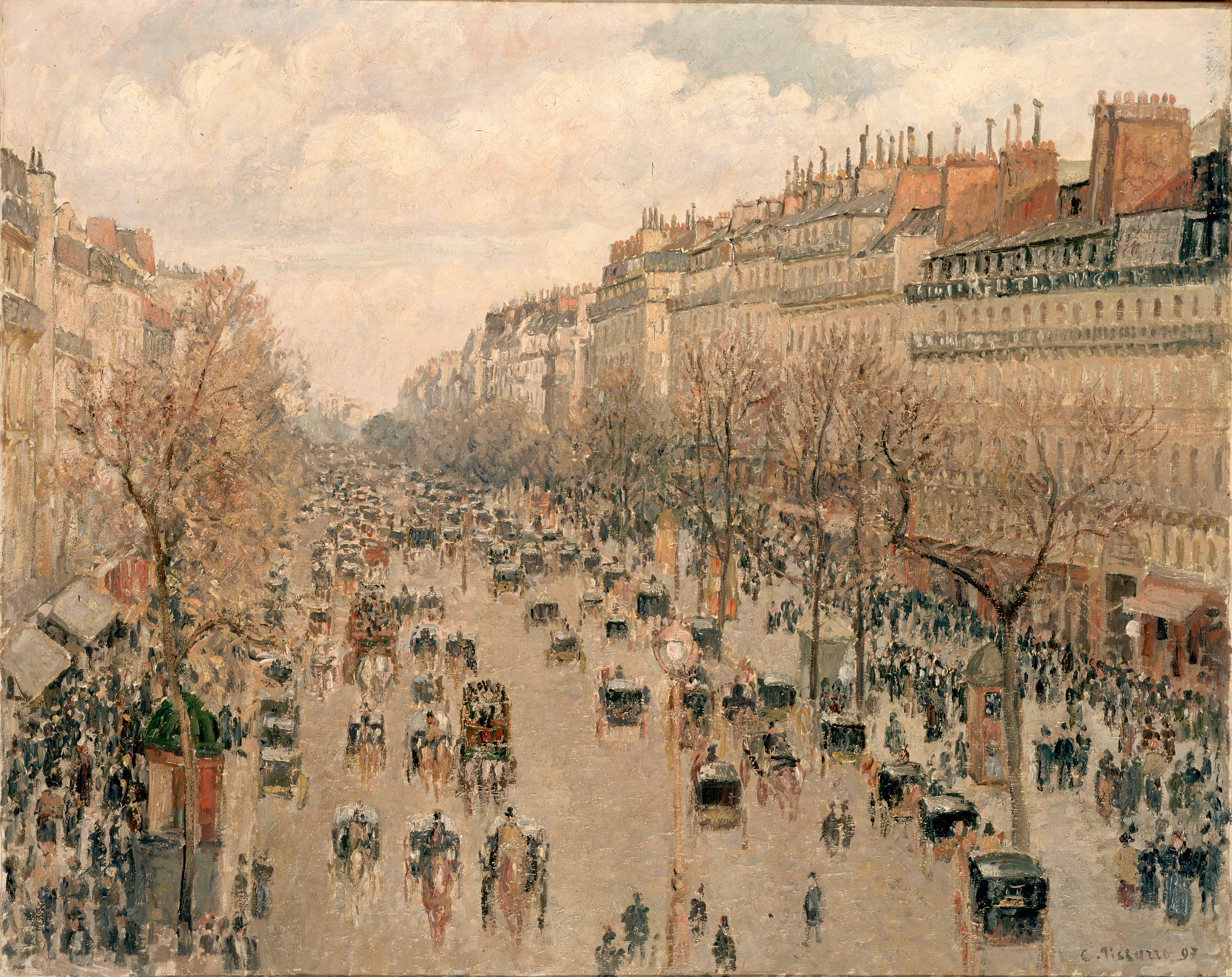
Boulevard Montmartre à Paris, 1897. Hermitage Museum

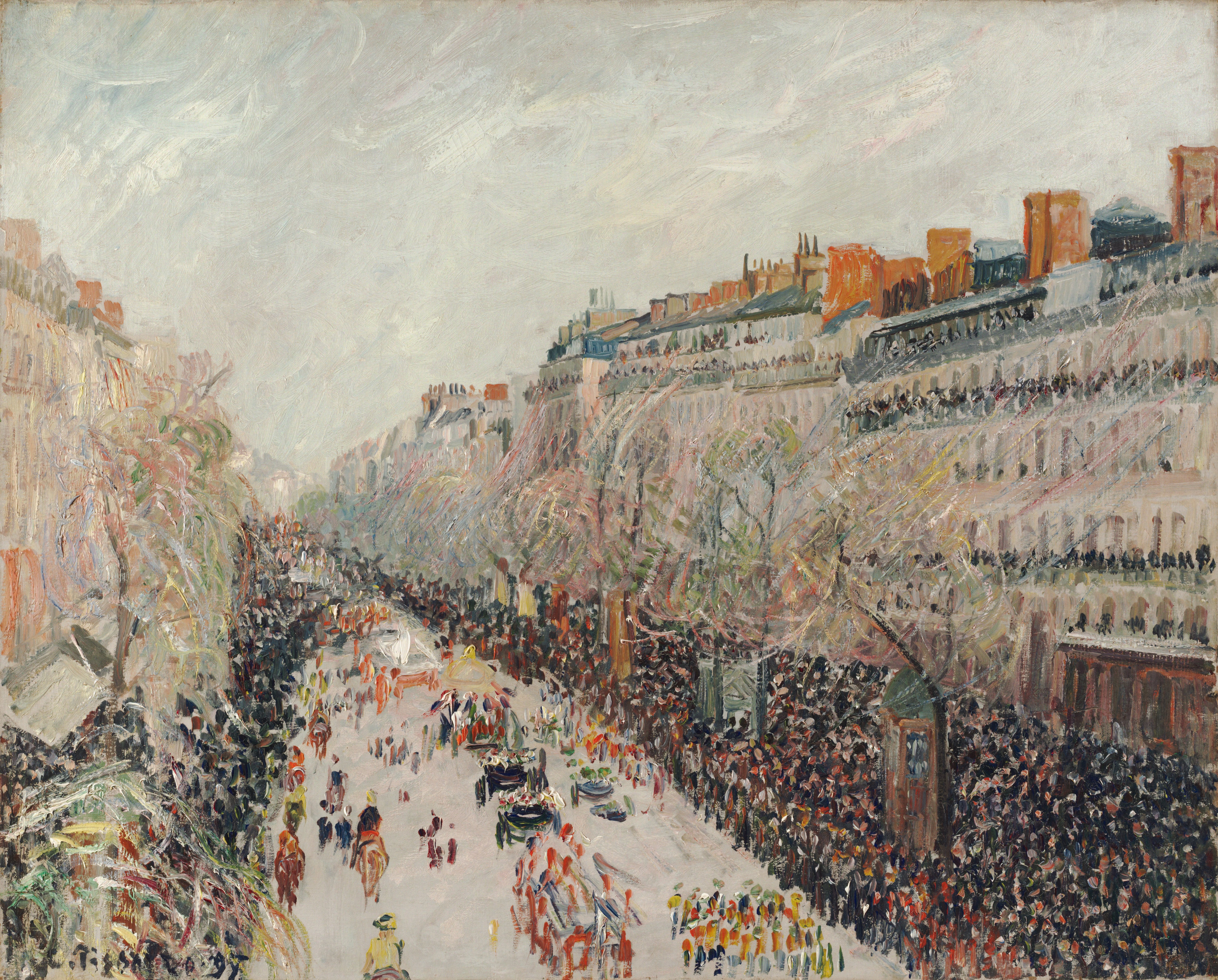
Mardi Gras on the Boulevards, 1897. Fogg Museum

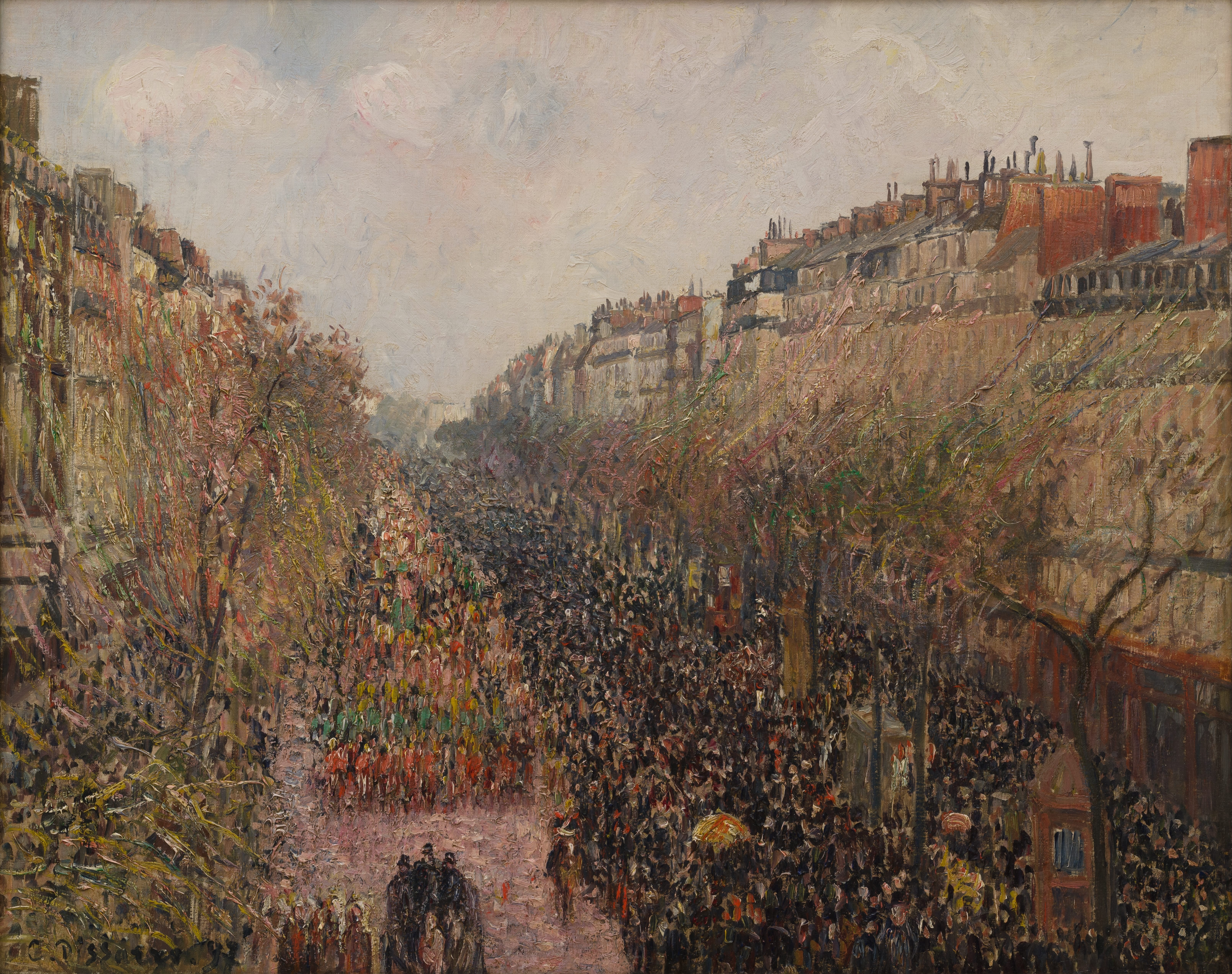
Boulevard Montmartre, Mardi Gras, 1897. Hammer Museum

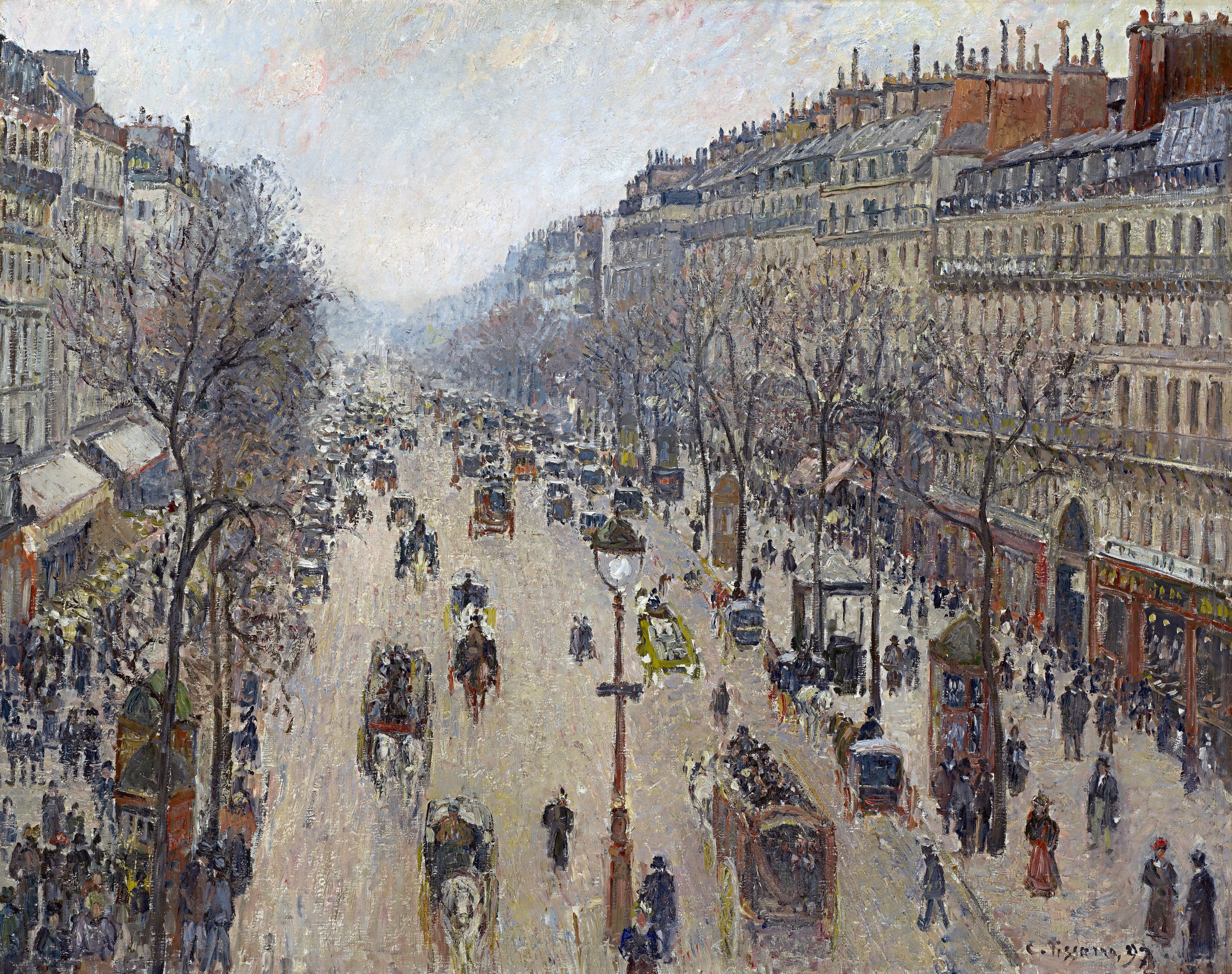
Boulevard Montmartre, morning, cloudy weather, 1897. National Gallery of Victoria

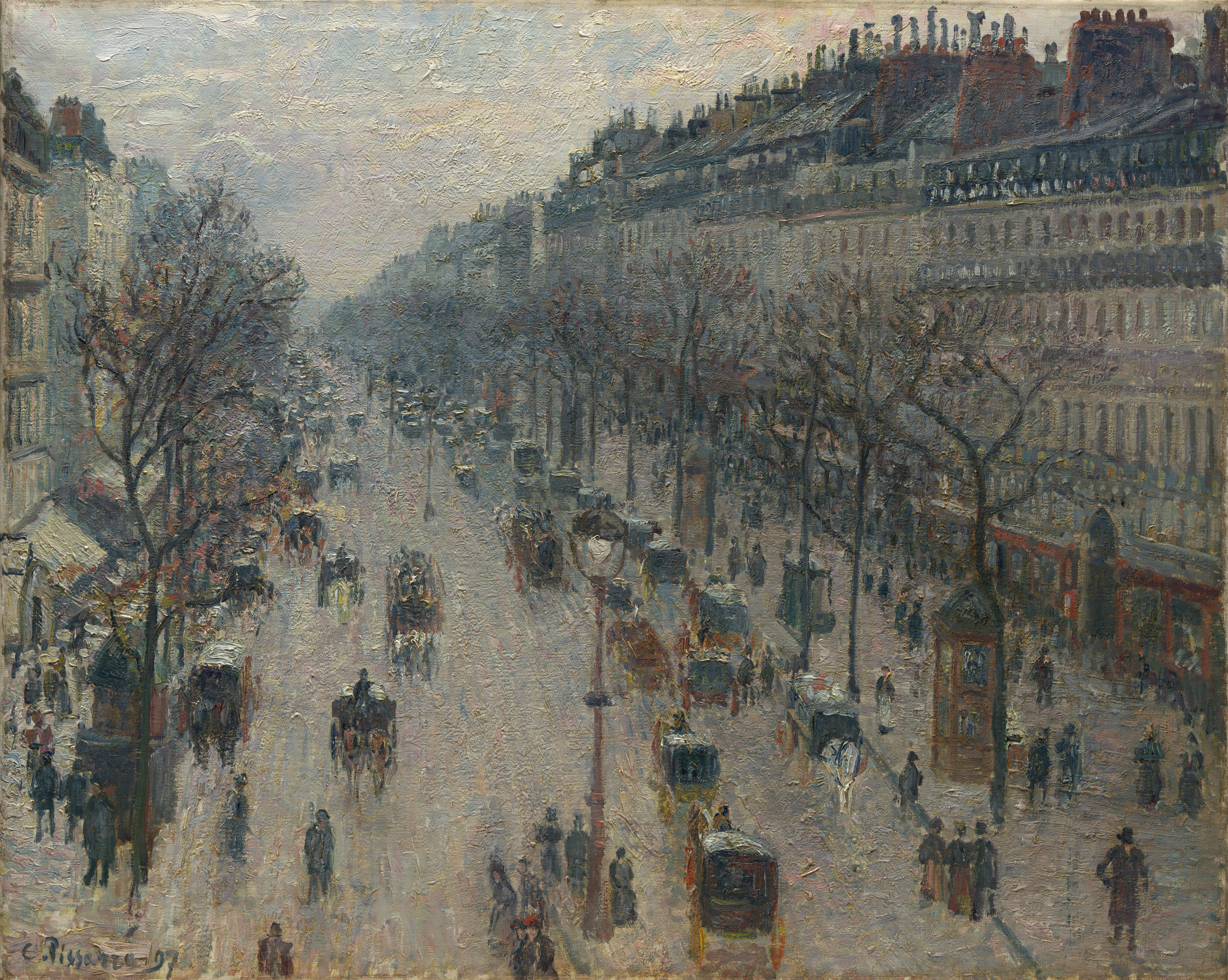
The Boulevard Montmartre on a Winter Morning, 1897. Metropolitan Museum of Art

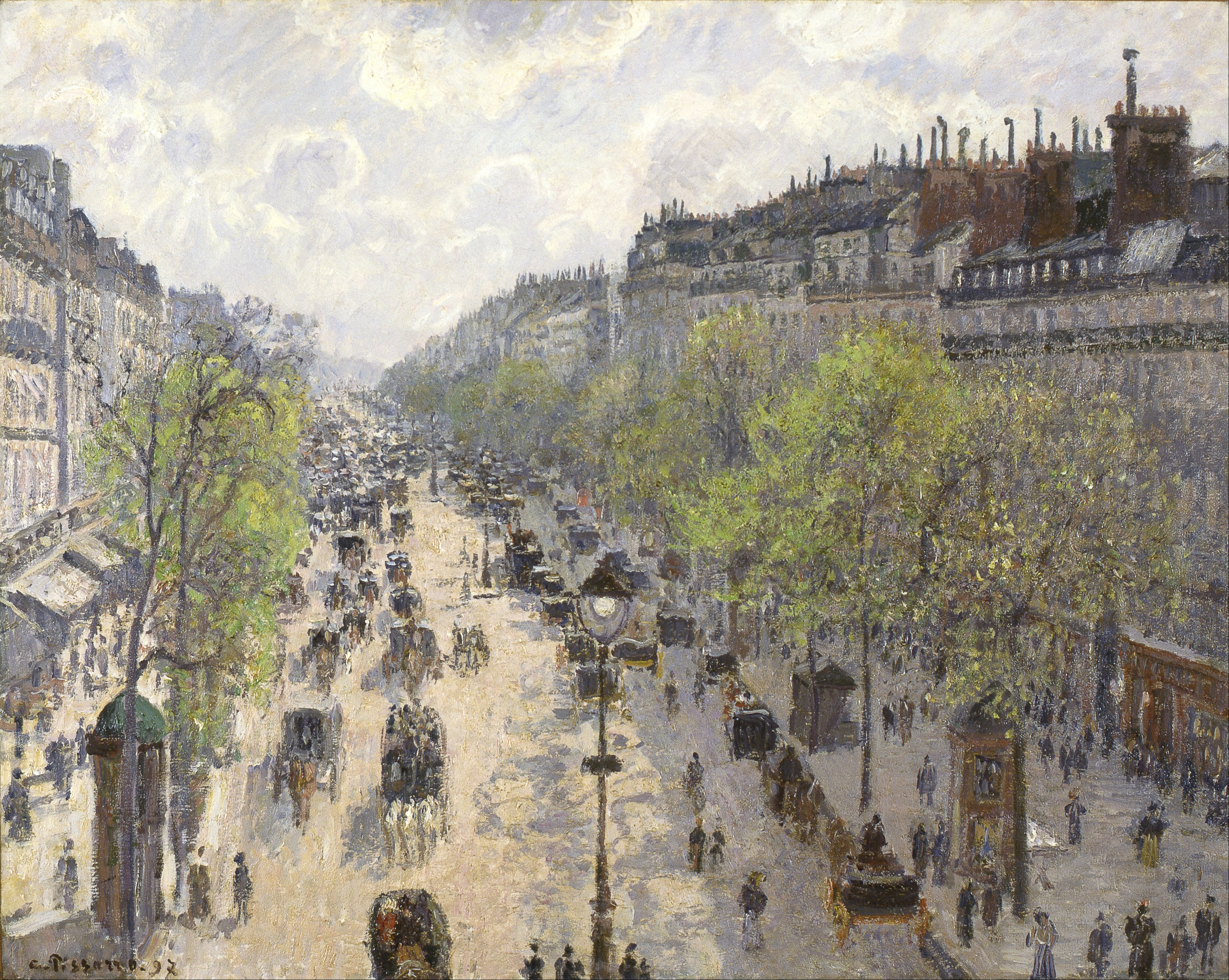
Le Boulevard de Montmartre, matinée de printemps, 1897. Private collection

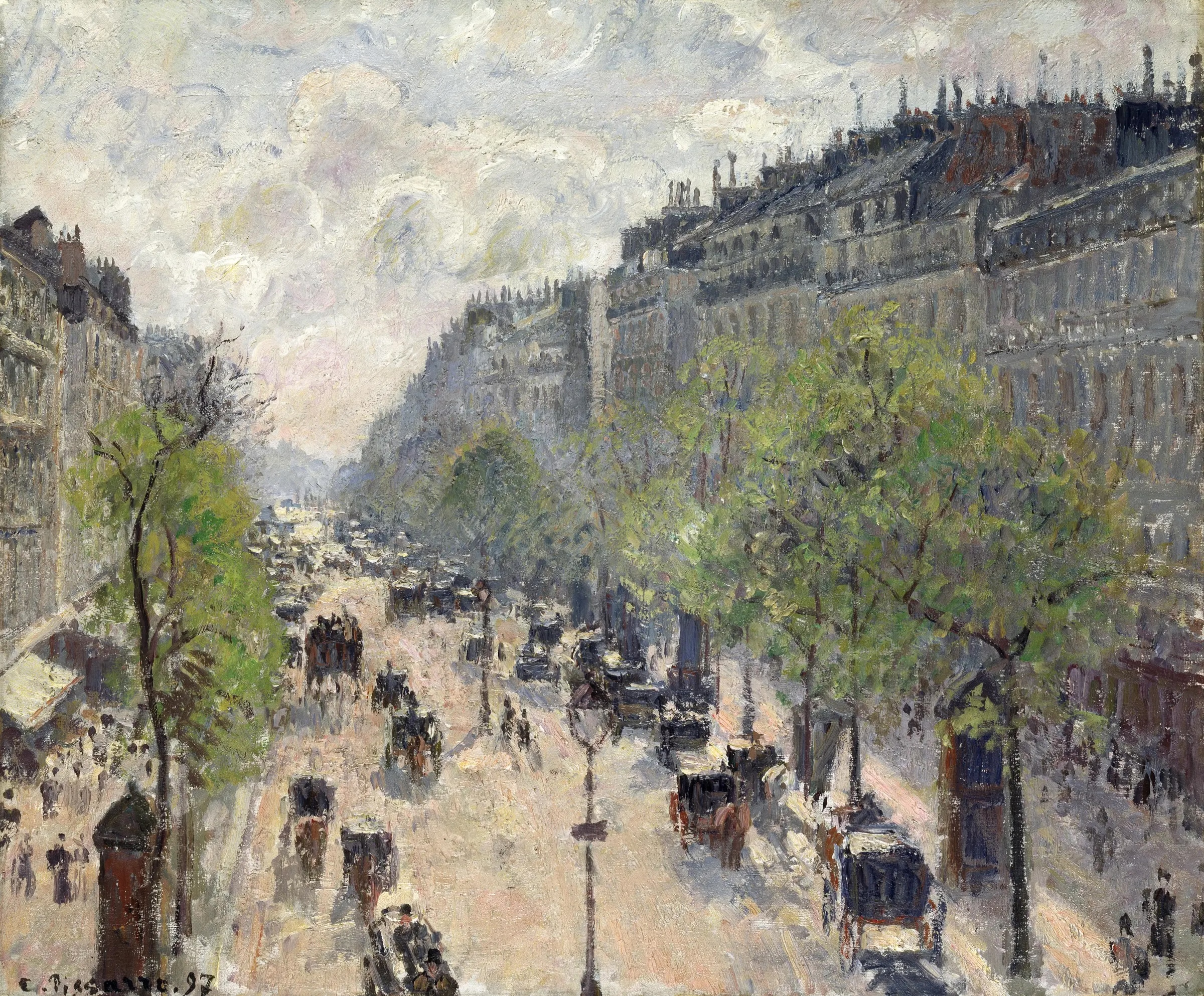
Boulevard Montmartre, Spring, 1897. Museum Langmatt

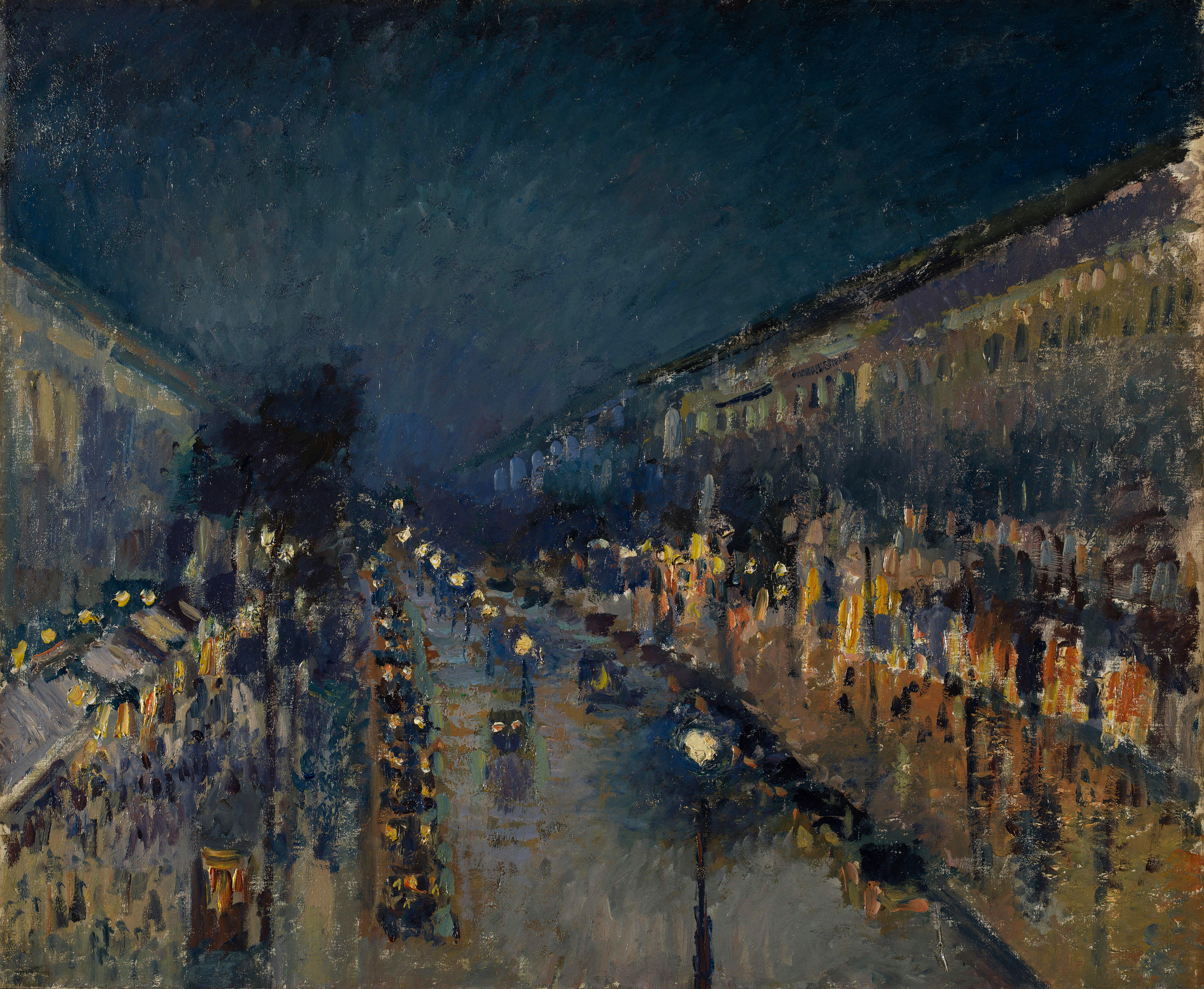
The Boulevard Montmartre at Night, 1897. National Gallery

== A family of painters ==
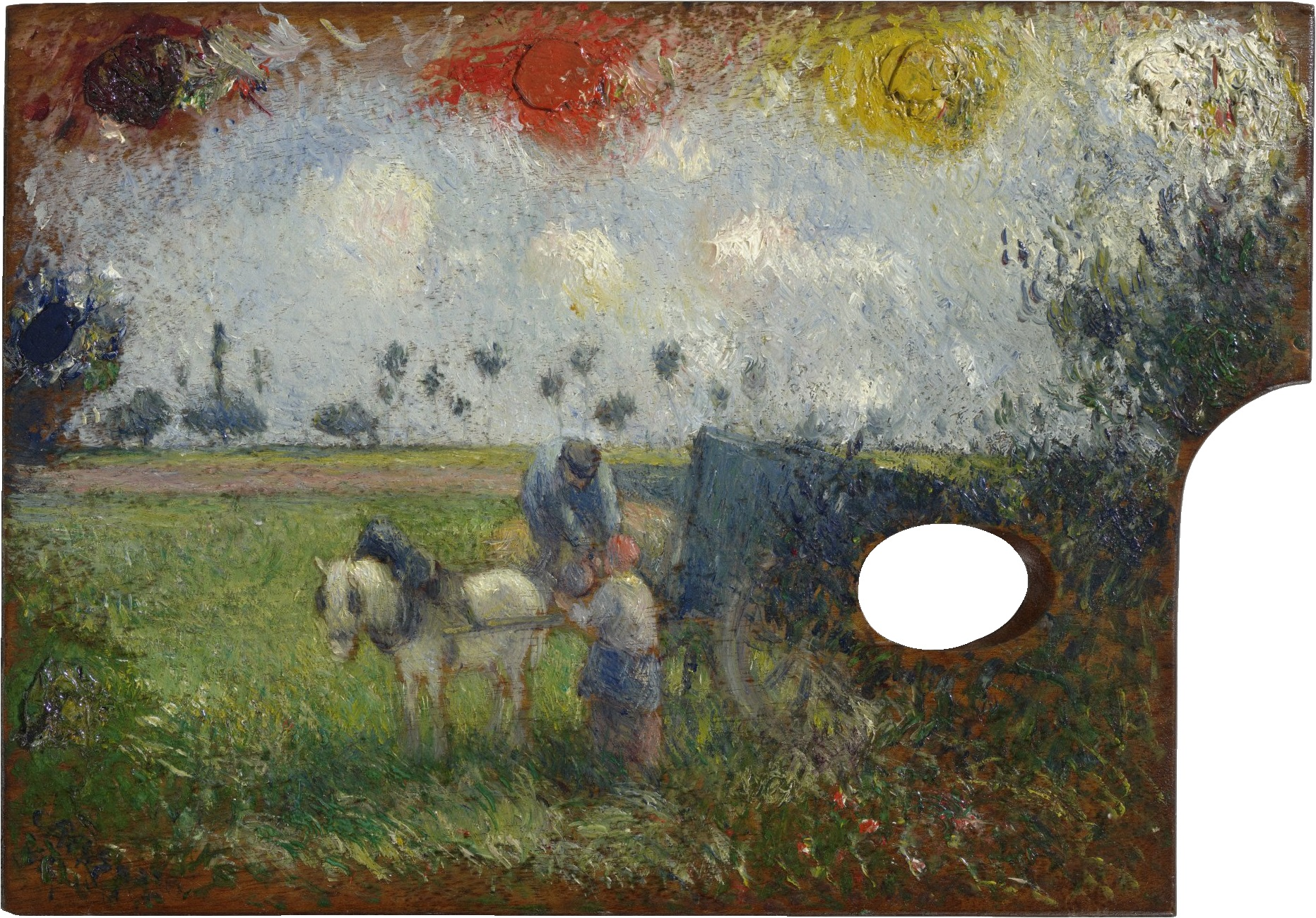
The Artist's Palette with a Landscape c. 1878. Clark Art Institute

Camille's son Lucien was an Impressionist and Neo-impressionist painter as were his second and third sons Georges Henri Manzana Pissarro and Félix Pissarro. Lucien's daughter Orovida Pissarro was also a painter. Camille's great-grandson, Joachim Pissarro, became Head Curator of Drawing and Painting at the Museum of Modern Art in New York City and a professor in Hunter College's Art Department. Camille's great-granddaughter, Lélia Pissarro, has had her work exhibited alongside her great-grandfather. Another great-granddaughter, Julia Pissarro, a Barnard College graduate, is also active in the art scene. From the only daughter of Camille, Jeanne Pissarro, other painters include Henri Bonin-Pissarro (1918–2003) and Claude Bonin-Pissarro (1921-2021), who is the father of the Abstract artist Frédéric Bonin-Pissarro (born 1964).

The grandson of Camille Pissarro, Hugues Claude Pissarro (dit Pomié), was born in 1935 in the western section of Paris, Neuilly-sur-Seine, and began to draw and paint as a young child under his father's tutelage. During his adolescence and early twenties he studied the works of the great masters at the Louvre. His work has been featured in exhibitions in Europe and the United States, and he was commissioned by the White House in 1959 to paint a portrait of U.S. President Dwight D. Eisenhower. He now lives and paints in Donegal, Ireland, with his wife Corinne also an accomplished artist and their children.

Stern Pissarro Gallery, in London, specialises in works by the family and provides a research and authentication service for artworks attributed to several of Camille Pissarro's descendants.

== Paintings ==
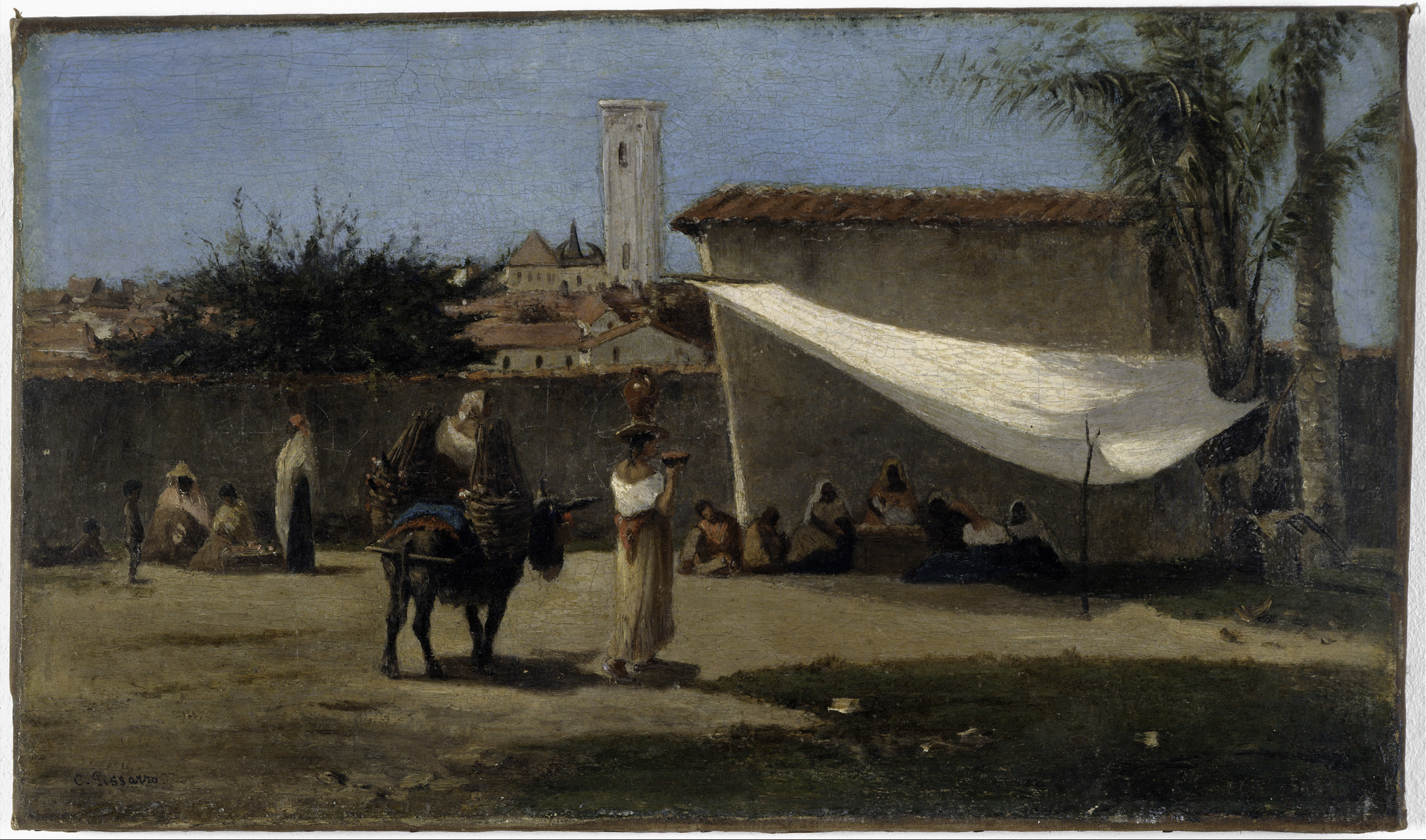
A Plaza in Caracas, c. 1850–52, oil on canvas. Colección Patricia Phelps de Cisneros

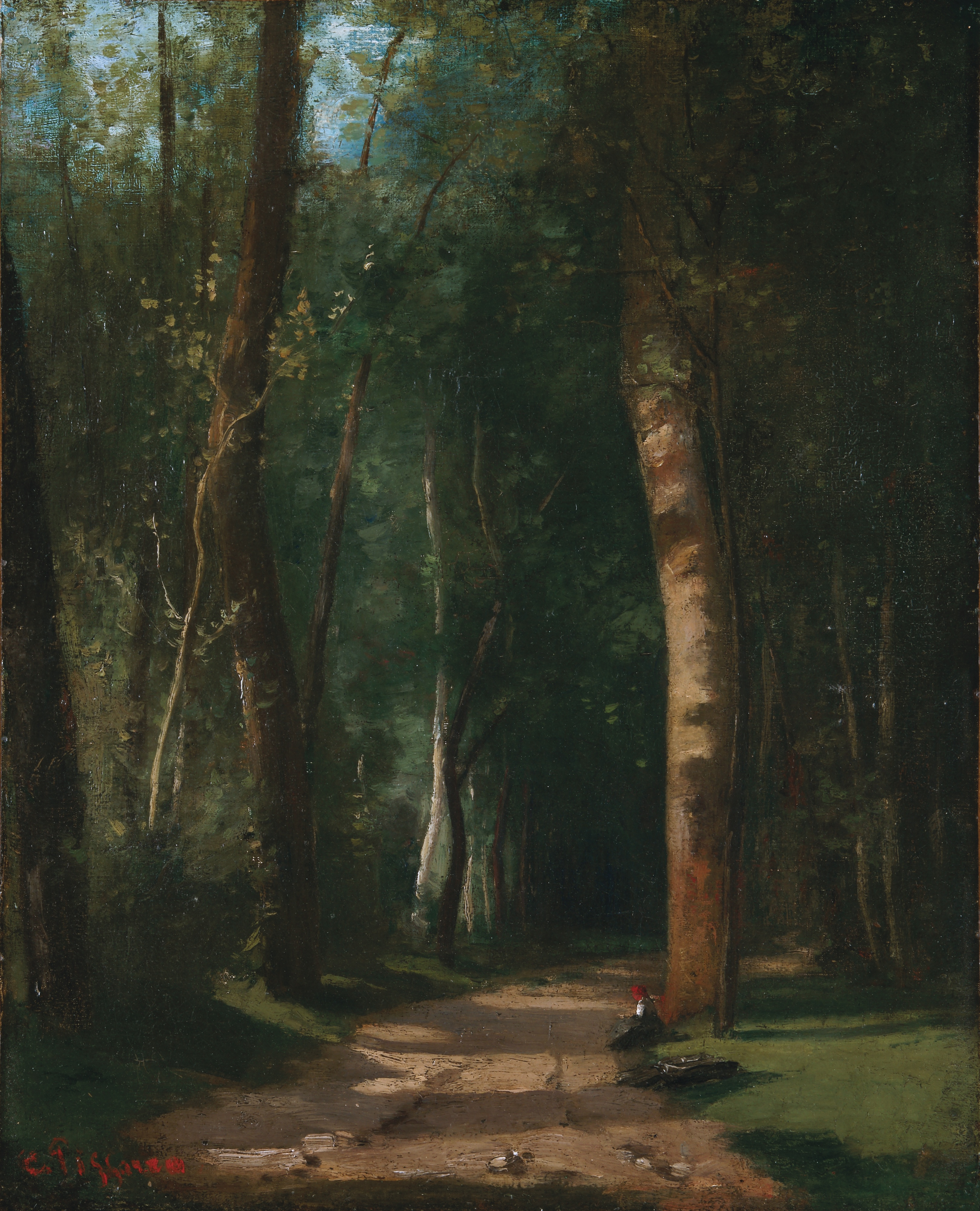
Allée dans une forêt (Road in a Forest), 1859, oil on canvas. Private Collection

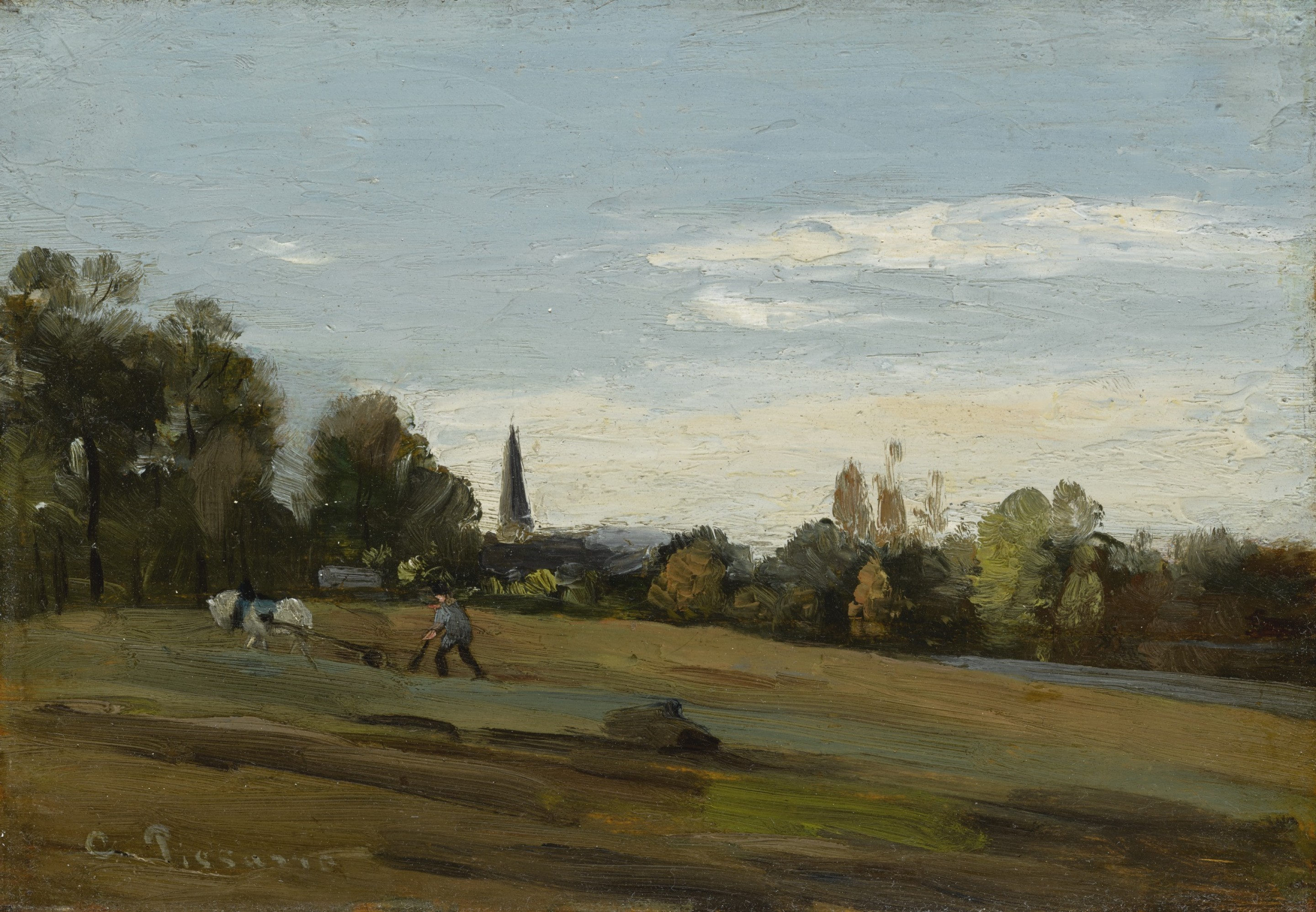
Working at Bérelles (Le Labourage, Bérelles), c. 1860, oil on panel, Private Collection

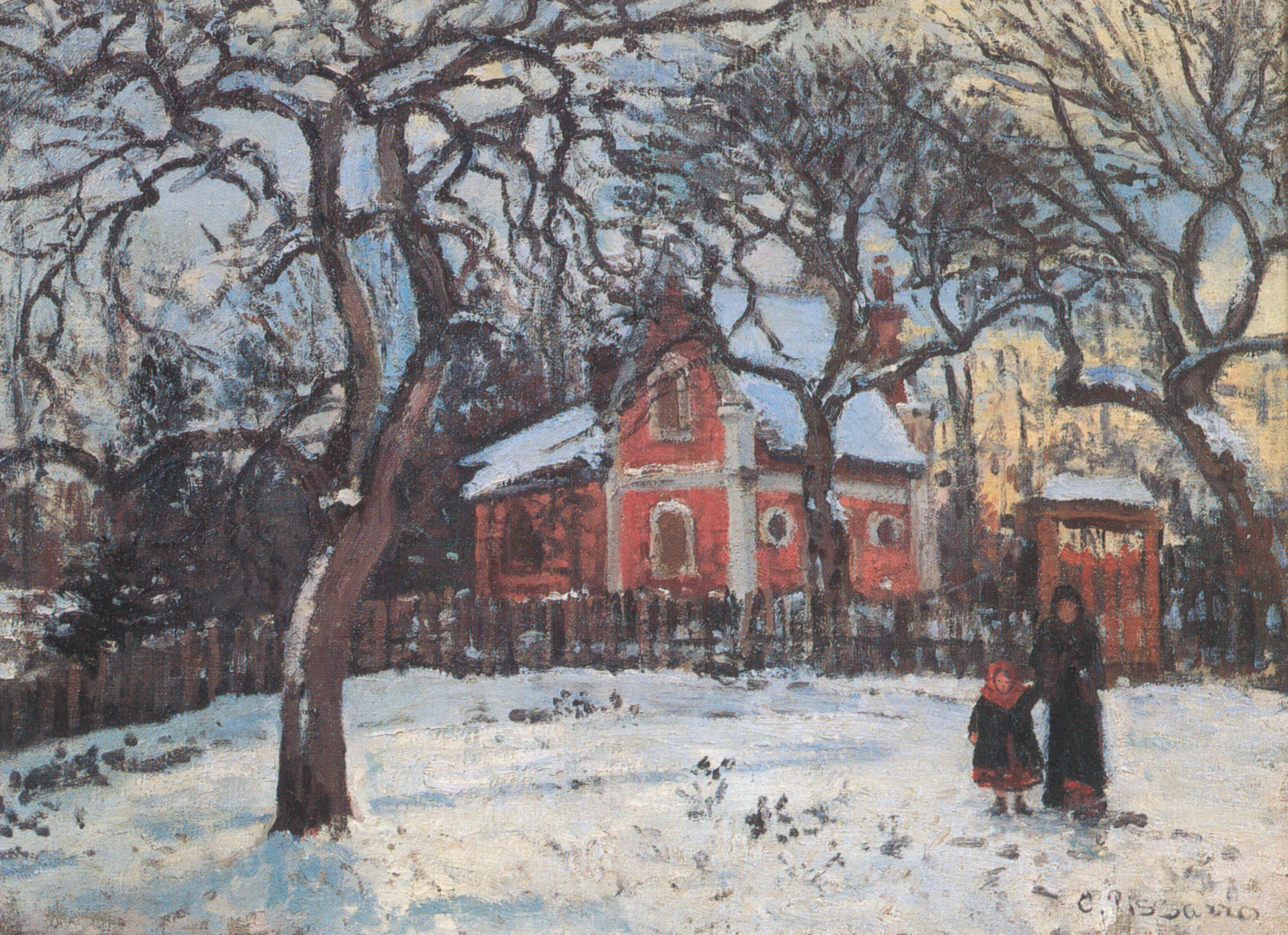
Châtaignier à Louveciennes, 1870. Musée d'Orsay, Paris

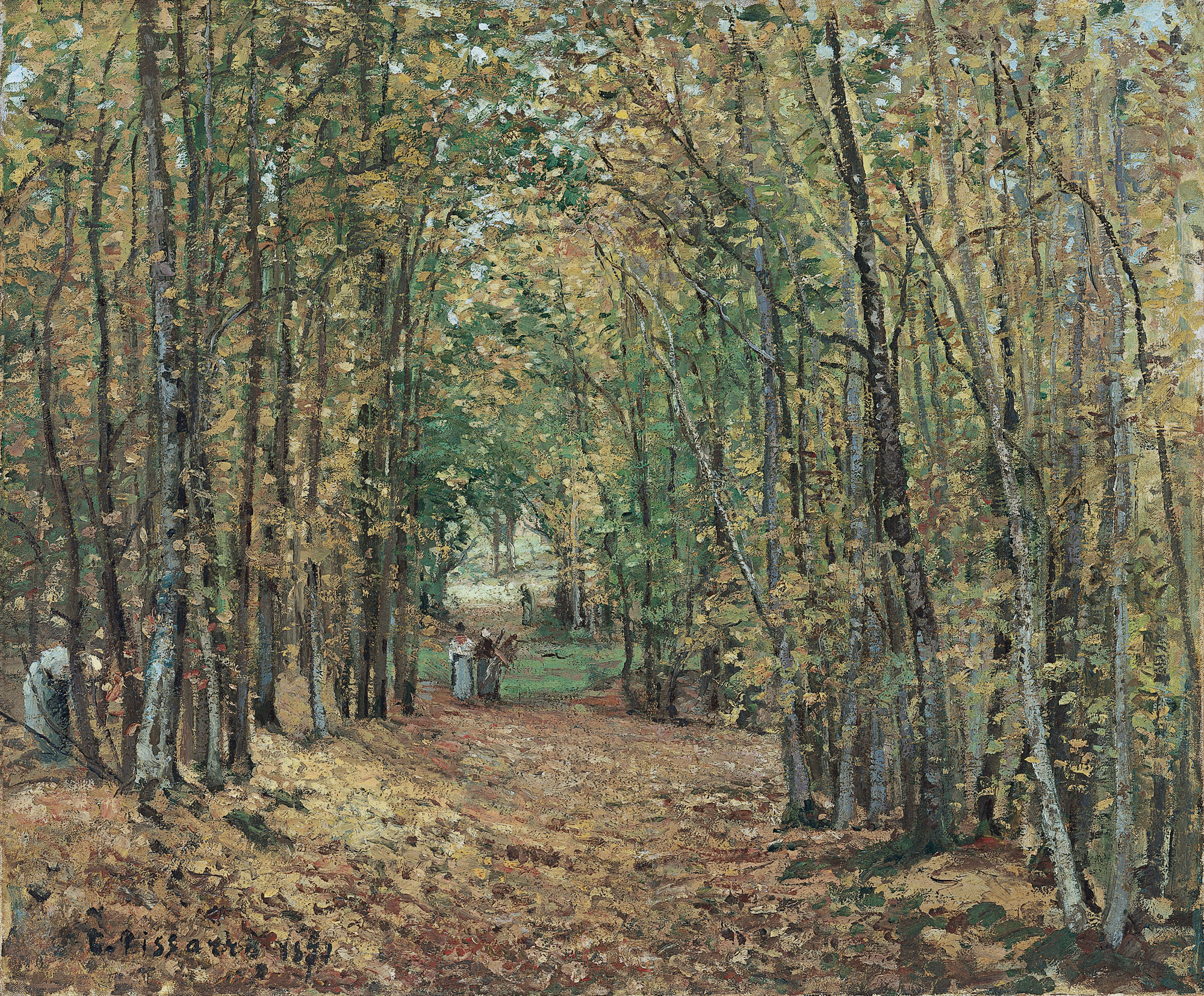
The Woods at Marly, 1871. Thyssen-Bornemisza Museum, Madrid

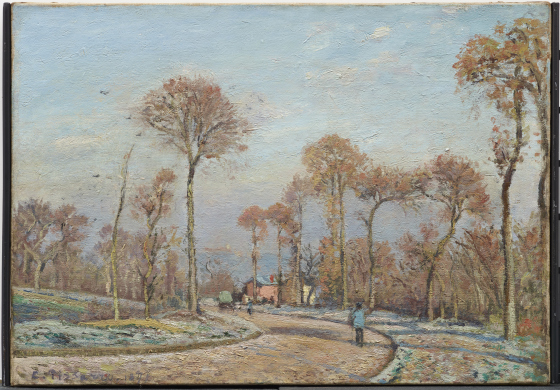
The Road to Versailles, Louveciennes: Morning Frost, 1871. Dallas Museum of Art

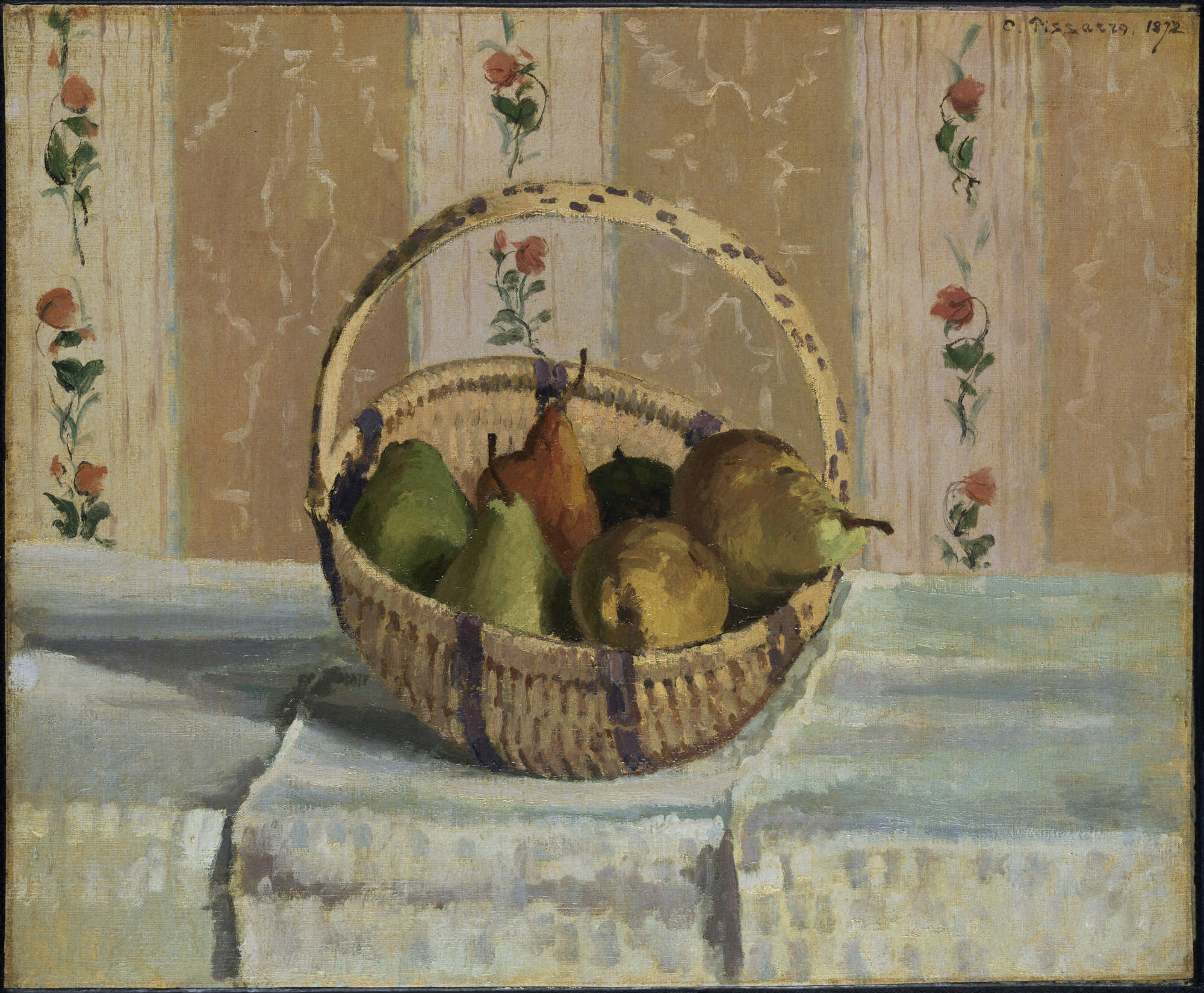
Still Life: Apples and Pears in a Round Basket, 1872. The Henry and Rose Pearlman Collection, on long-term loan to the Princeton University Art Museum

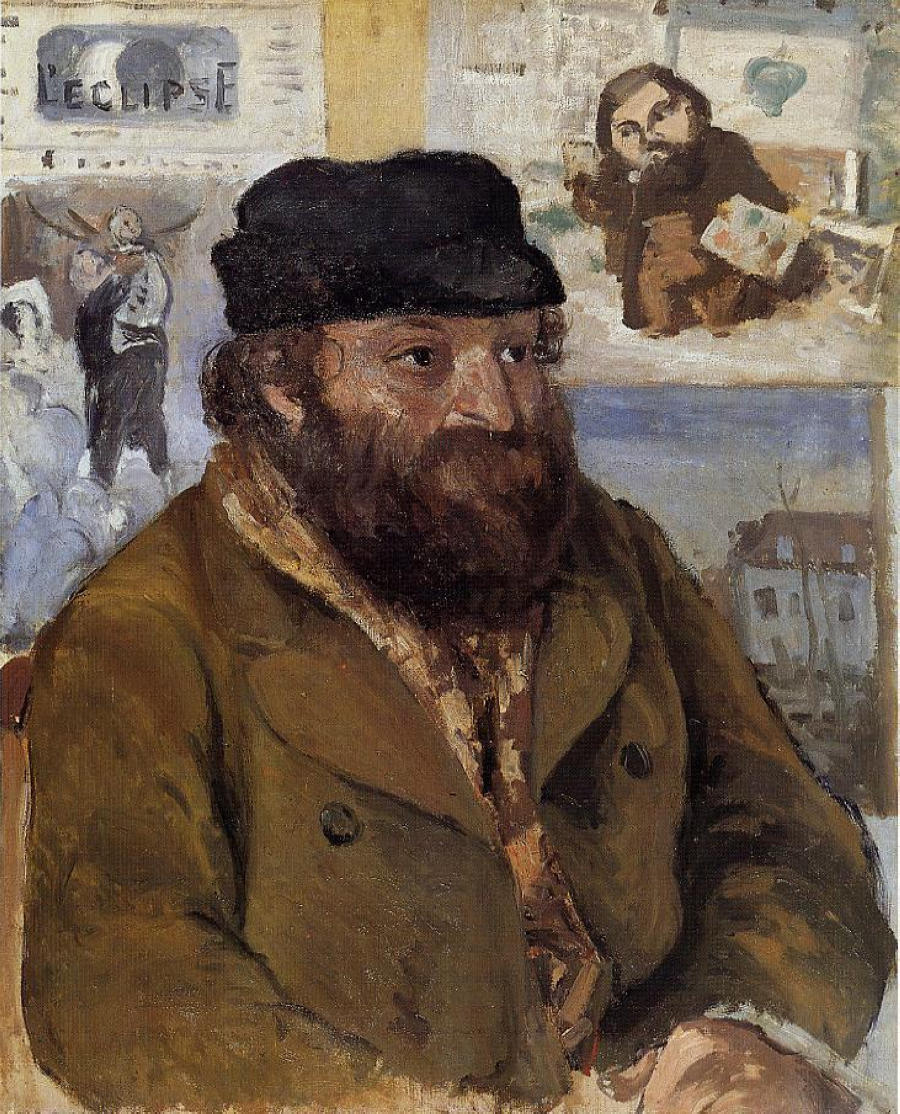
Camille Pissarro, Portrait of Paul Cézanne, 1874. National Gallery, London

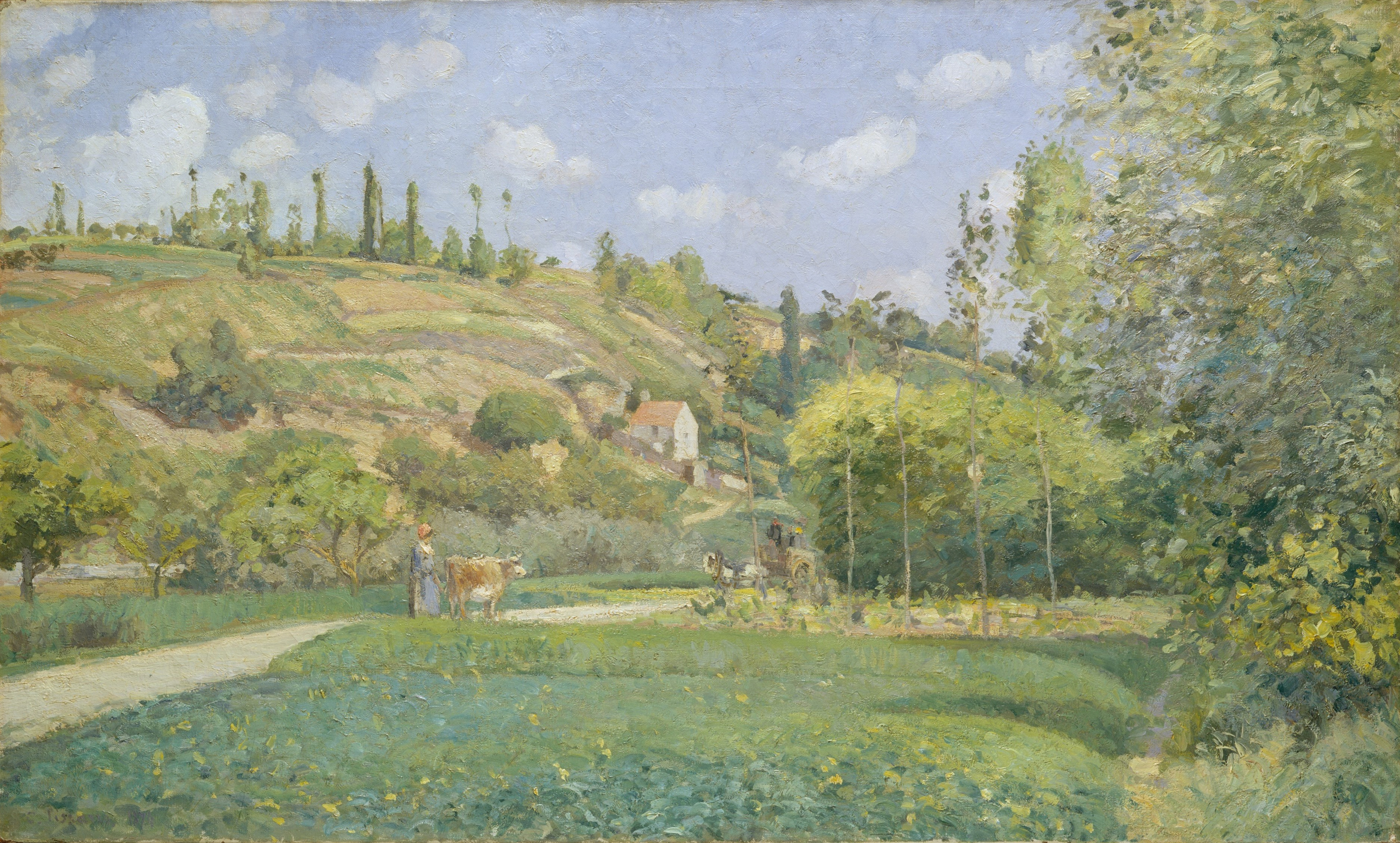
A Cowherd at Valhermeil, Auvers-sur-Oise, 1874. Metropolitan Museum of Art, New York

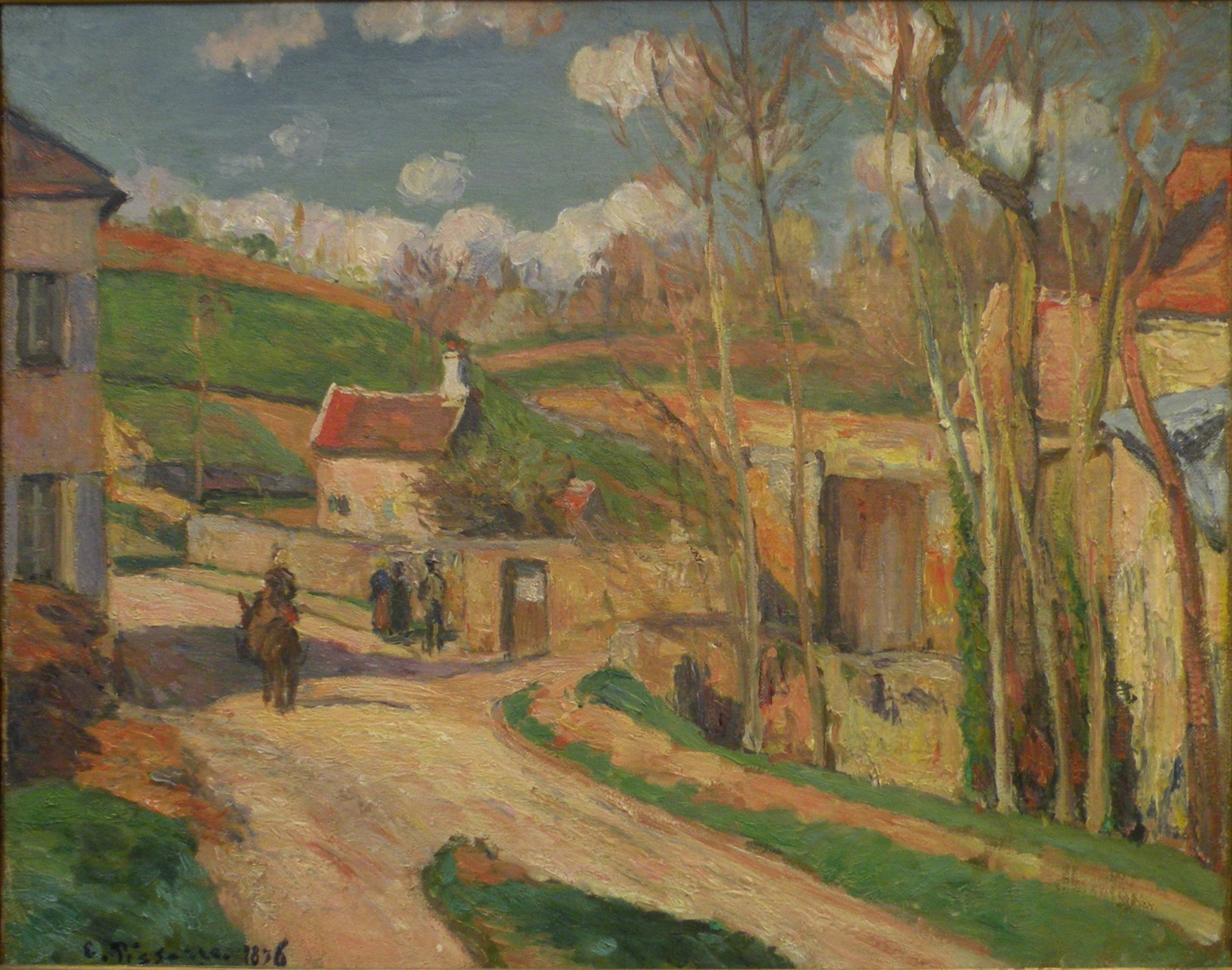
Un Carrefour à l'Hermitage, Pontoise, 1876. Musée Malraux, Le Havre

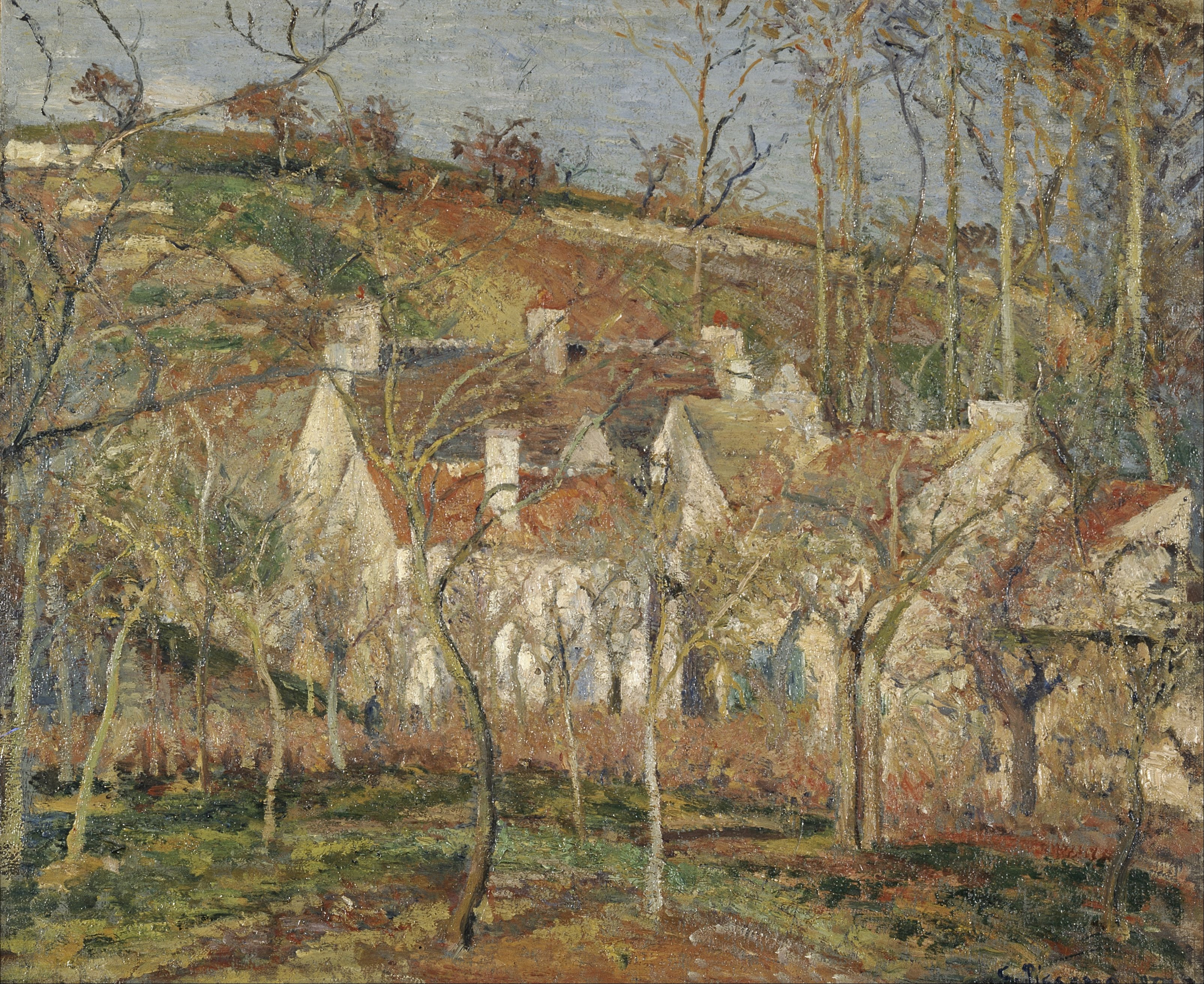
Toits rouges, coin d'un village, hiver, Côte de Saint-Denis, Pontoise, 1877. Musée d'Orsay, Paris

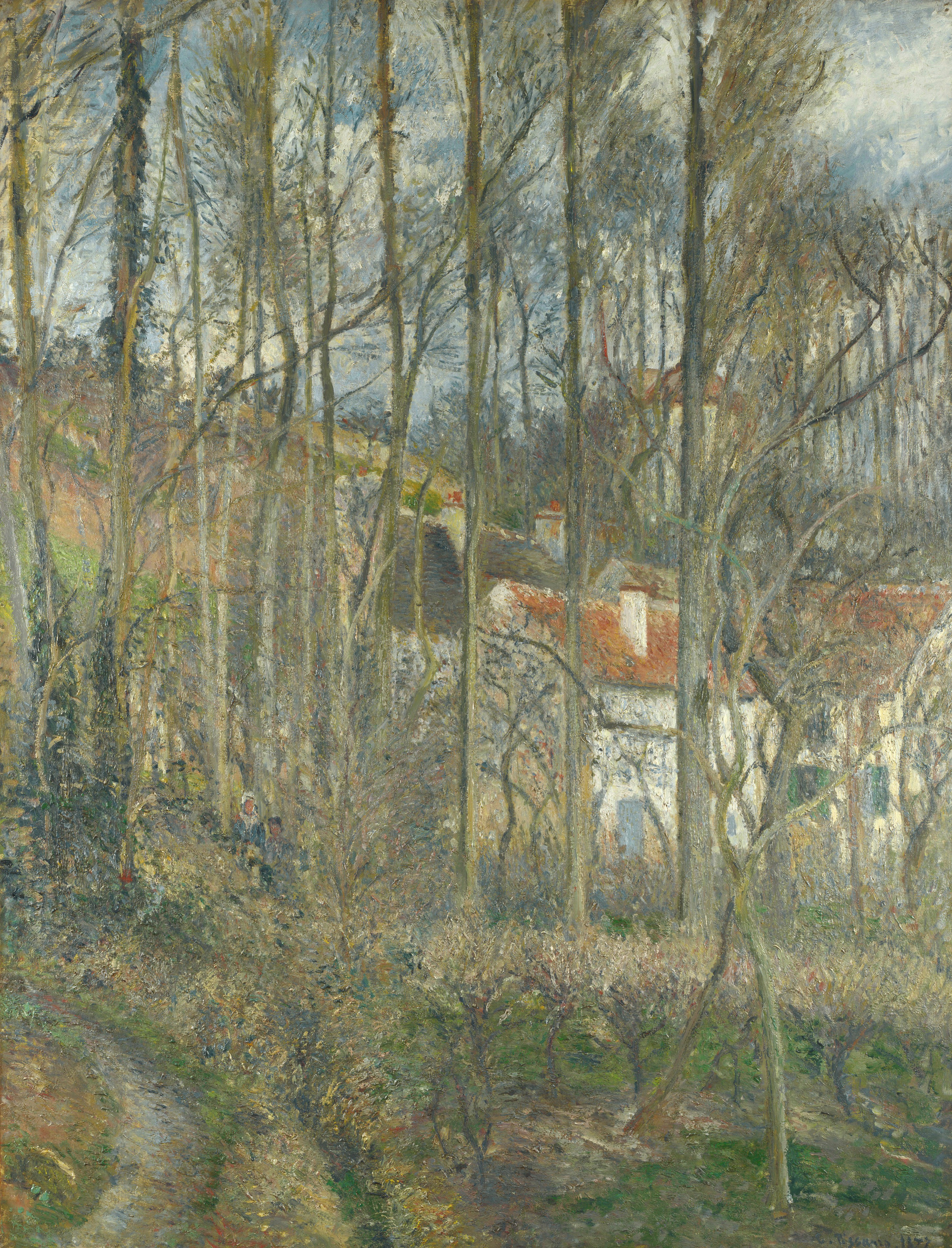
The Côte des Bœufs at L'Hermitage, 1877. National Gallery, London

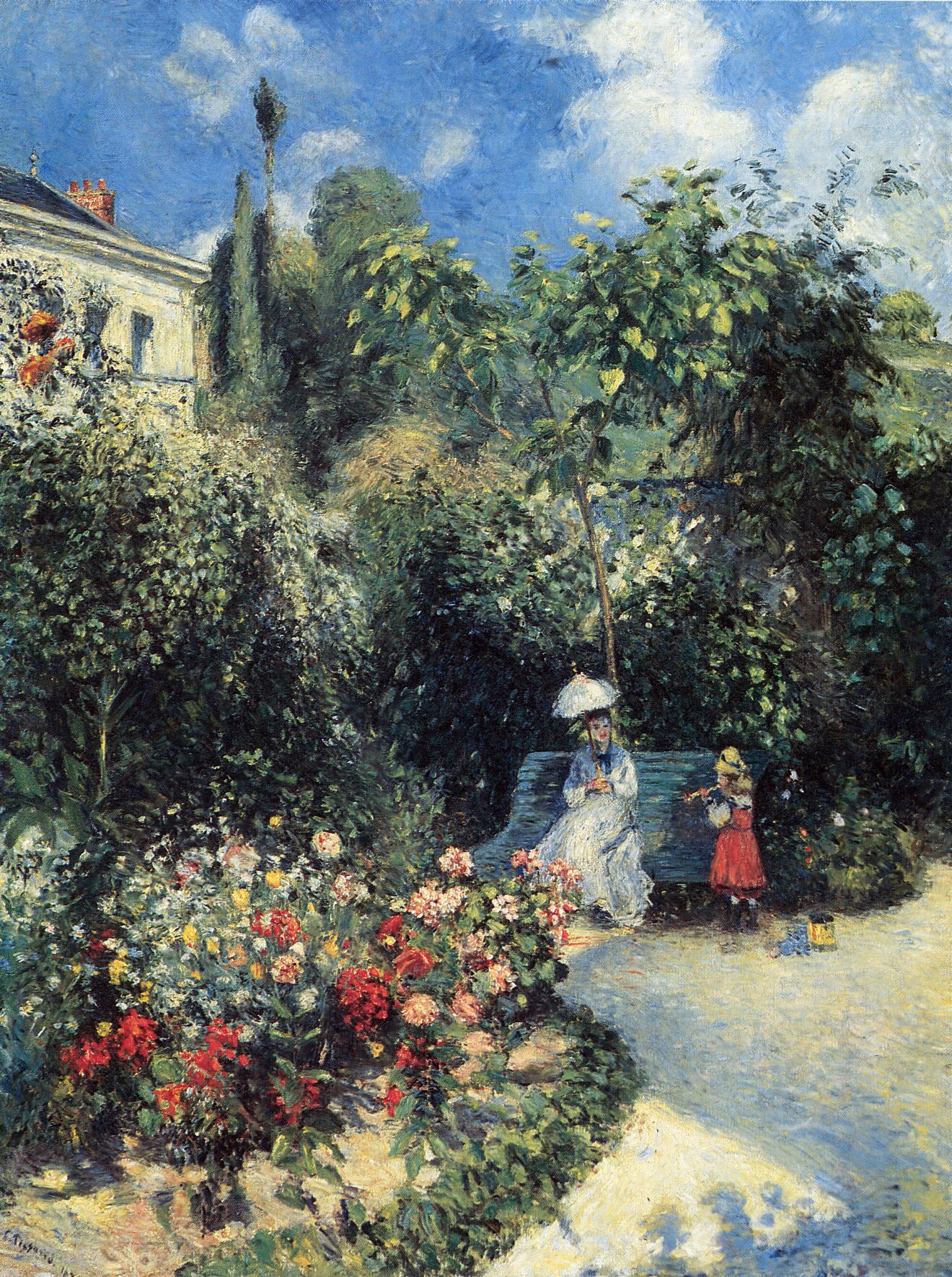
The Garden of Pontoise, 1877. Private Collection

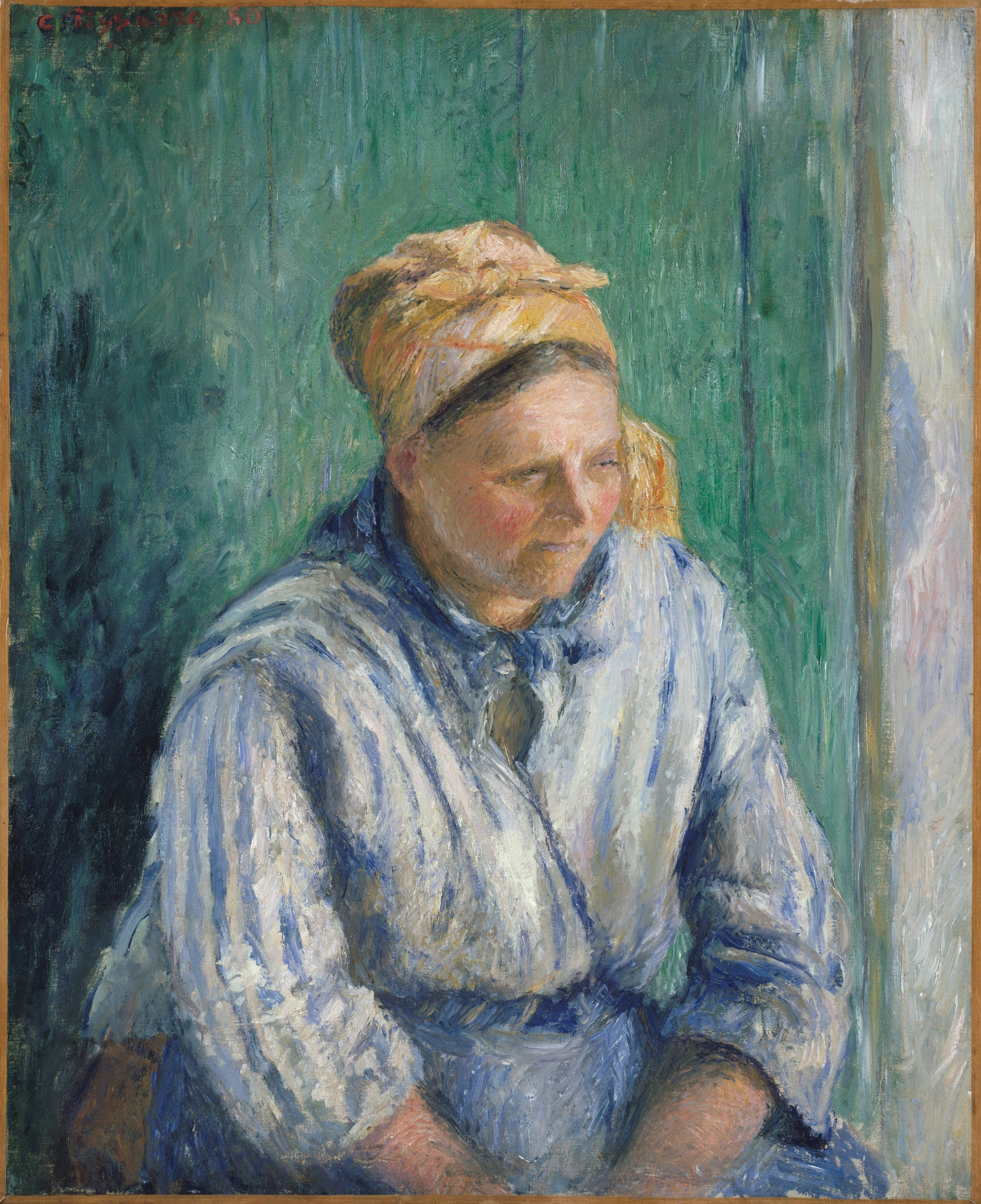
Washerwoman, Study, 1880. Metropolitan Museum of Art, New York

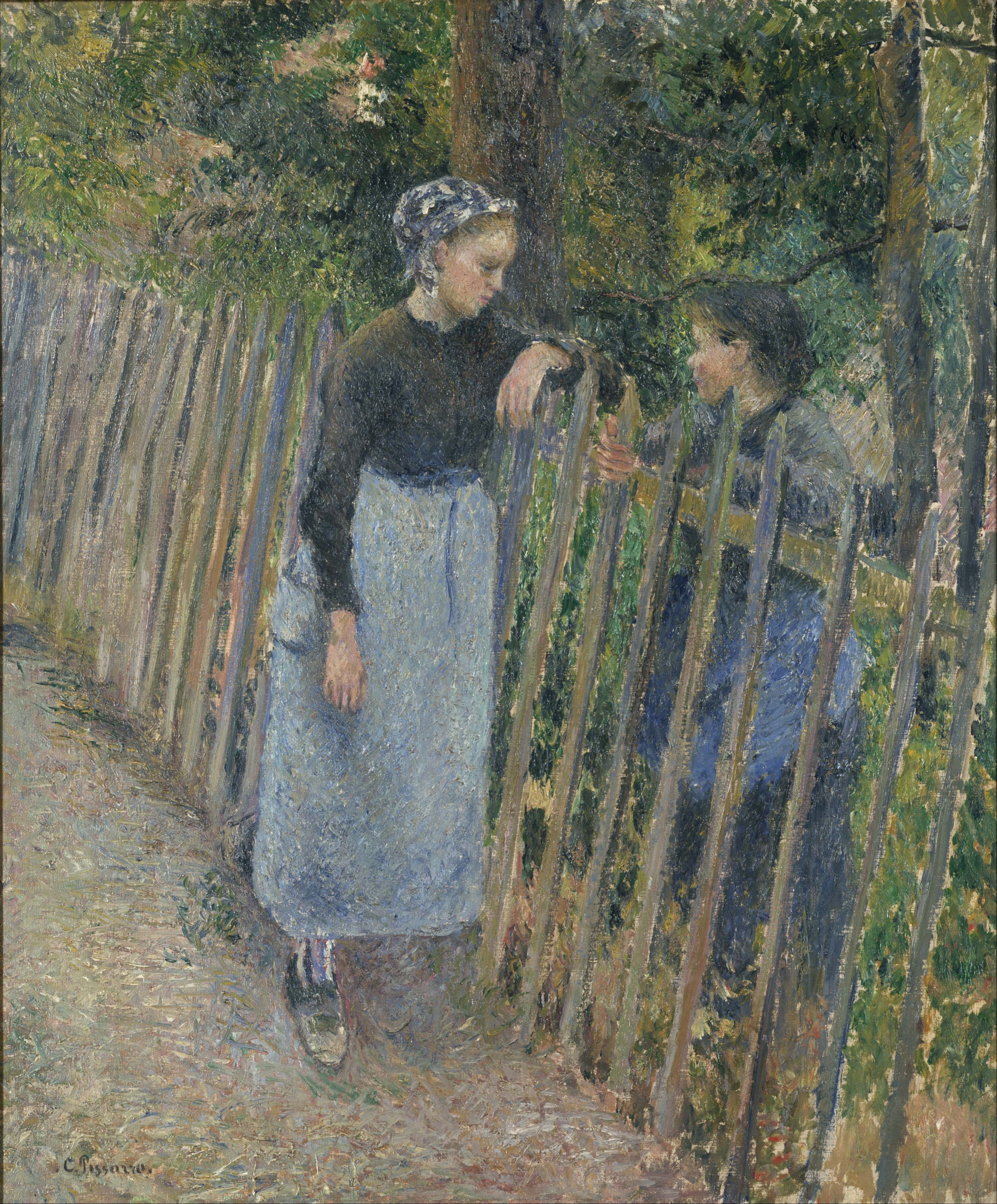
Conversation, c. 1881. National Museum of Western Art, Tokyo

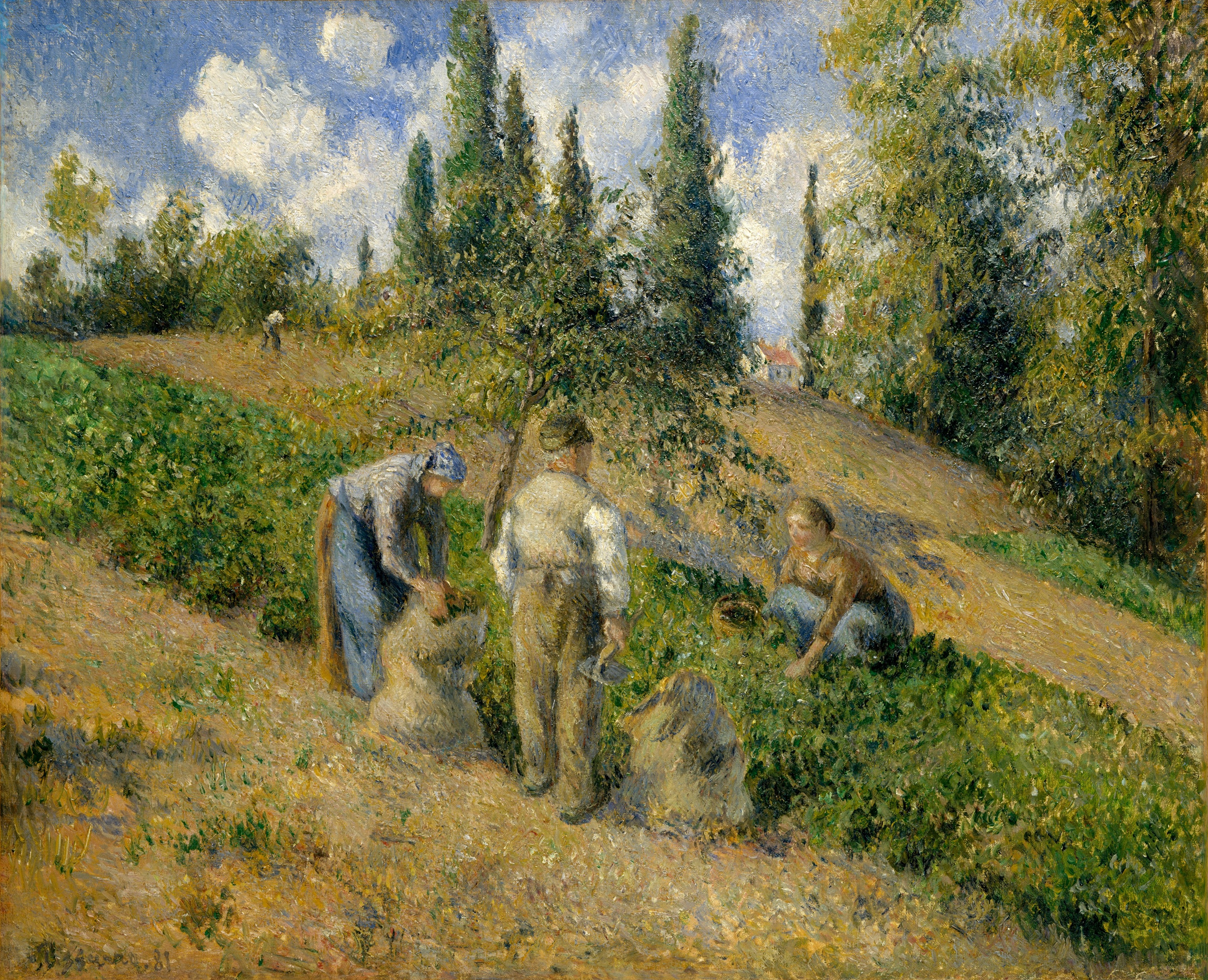
The Harvest, Pontoise, 1881. Metropolitan Museum of Art, New York

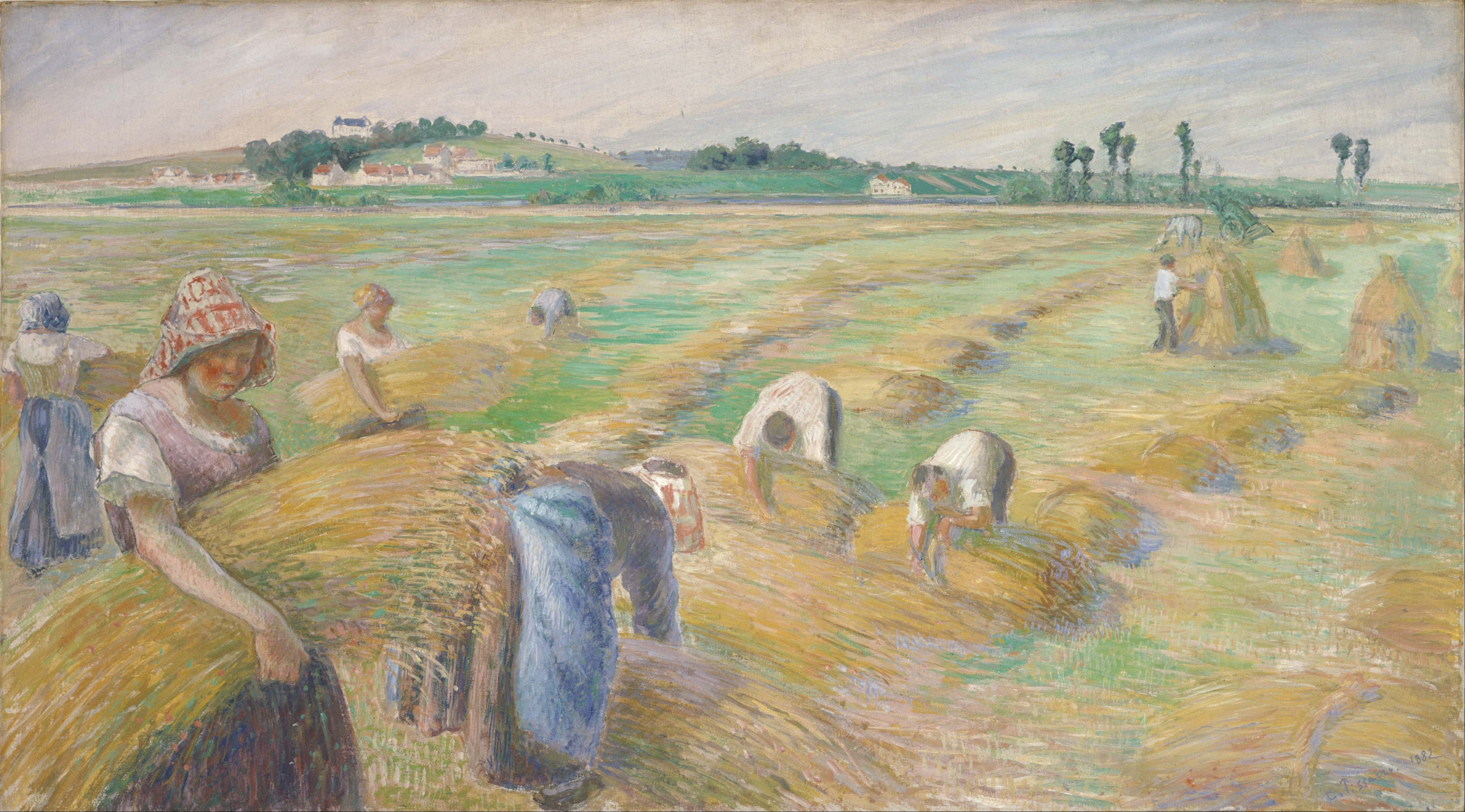
The Harvest, 1882. Artizon Museum, Tokyo

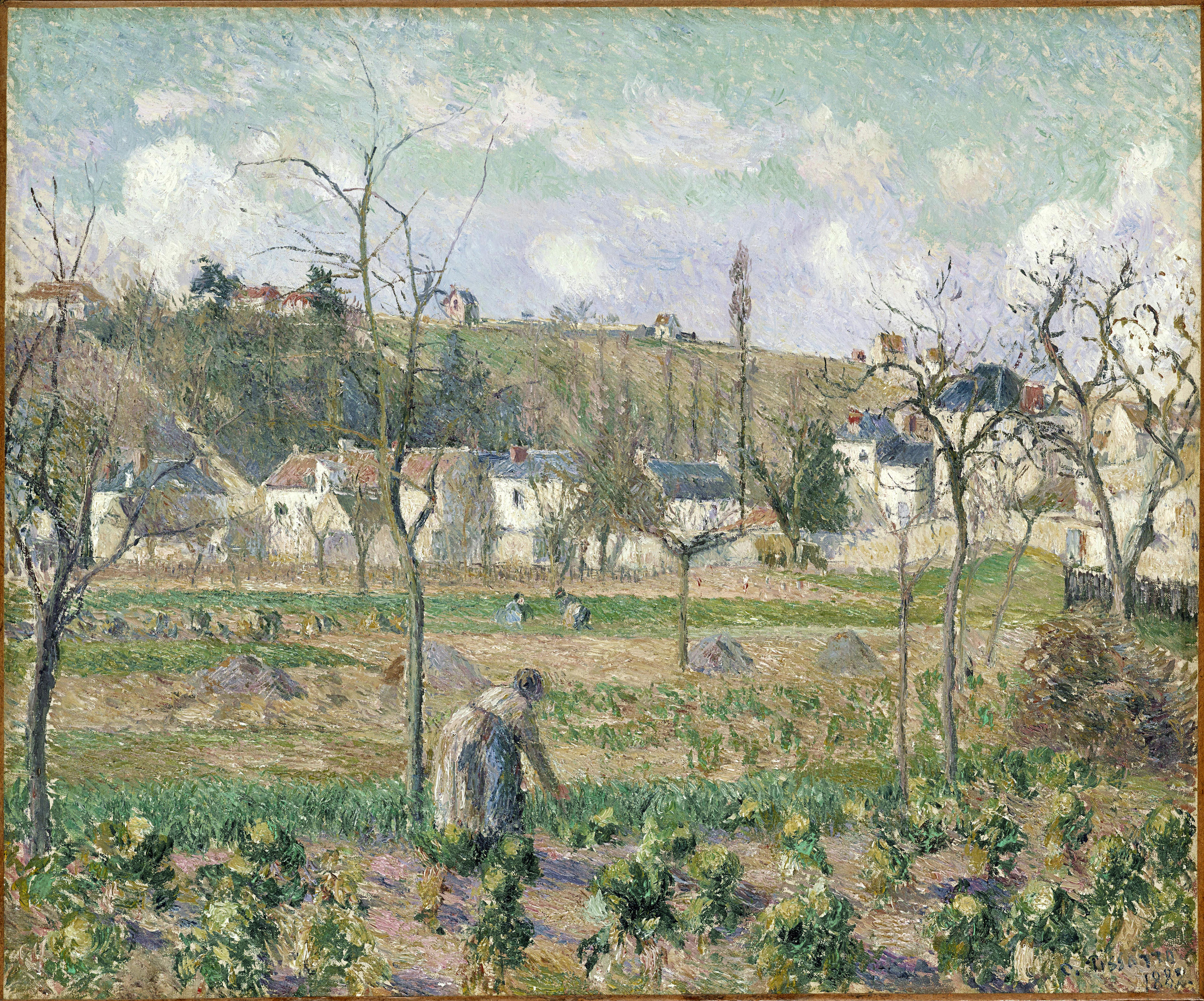
Le jardin de Maubuisson, Pontoise, 1882. Private Collection

The Church at Eragny, 1884. Walters Art Museum

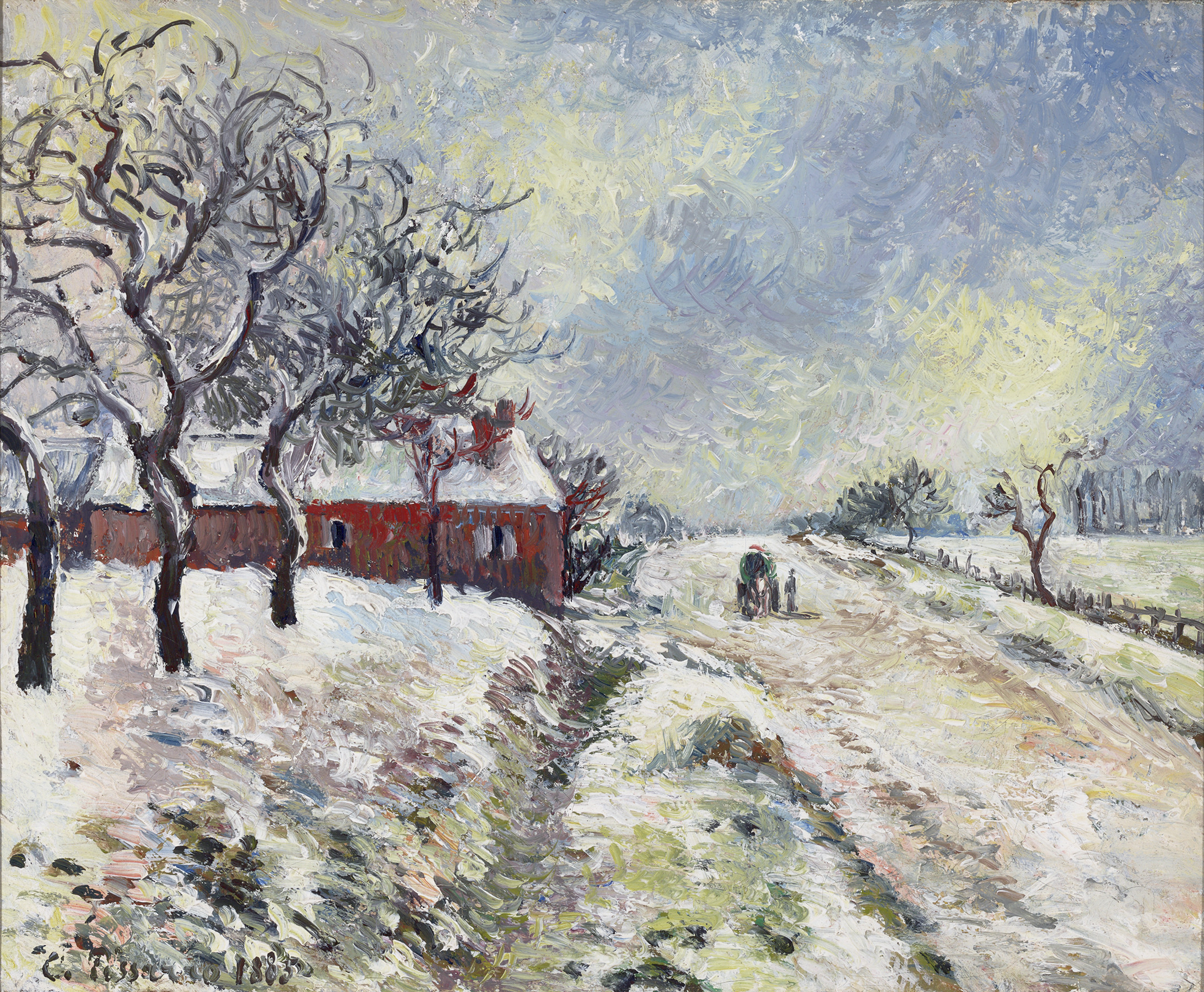
Route Enneigée avec maison, environs d'Éragny, 1885. Private Collection, Germany. Courtesy of Stern Pissarro Gallery.

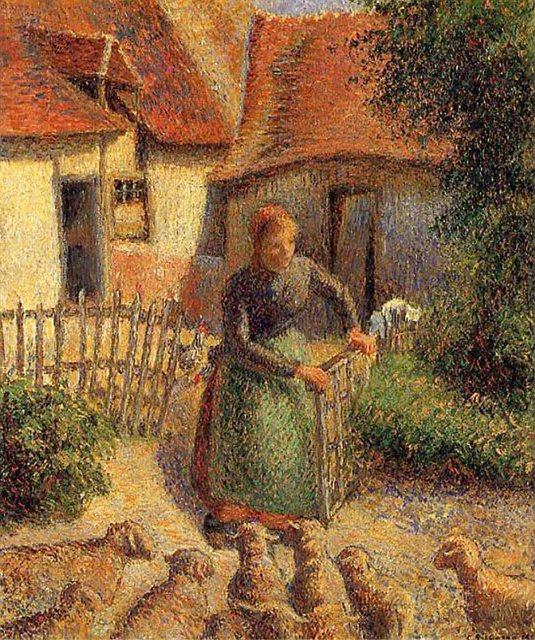
Shepherdess Bringing in Sheep (Bergère rentrant des moutons) 1886. University of Oklahoma

Children on a Farm, 1887. Collection of G. Signac, Paris

Haying at Eragny, 1889. Private Collection

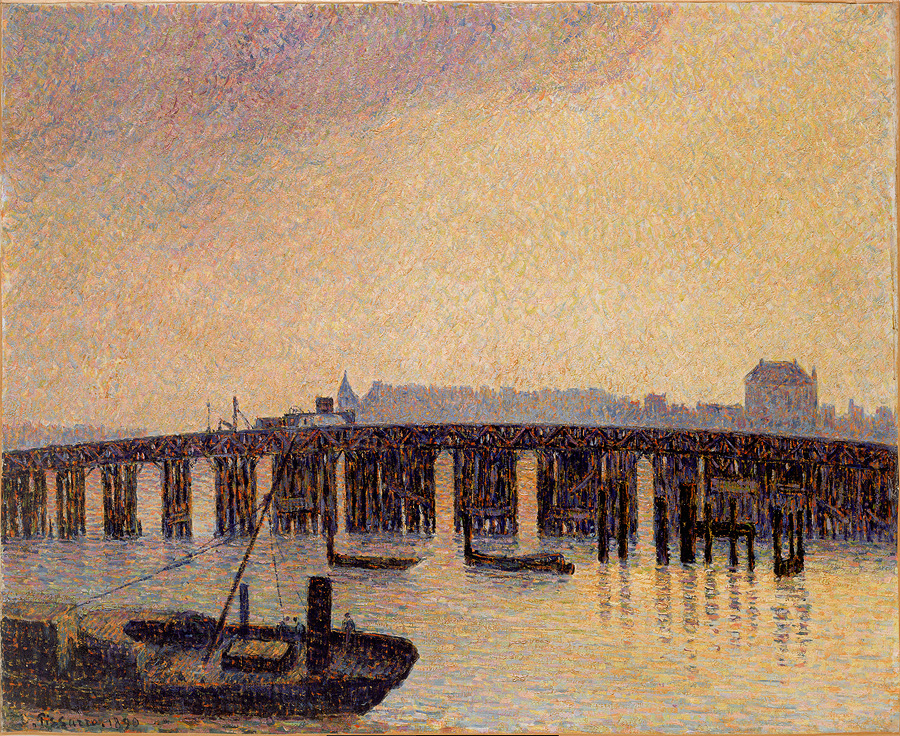
Old Chelsea Bridge, London 1890. Smith College Museum of Arts

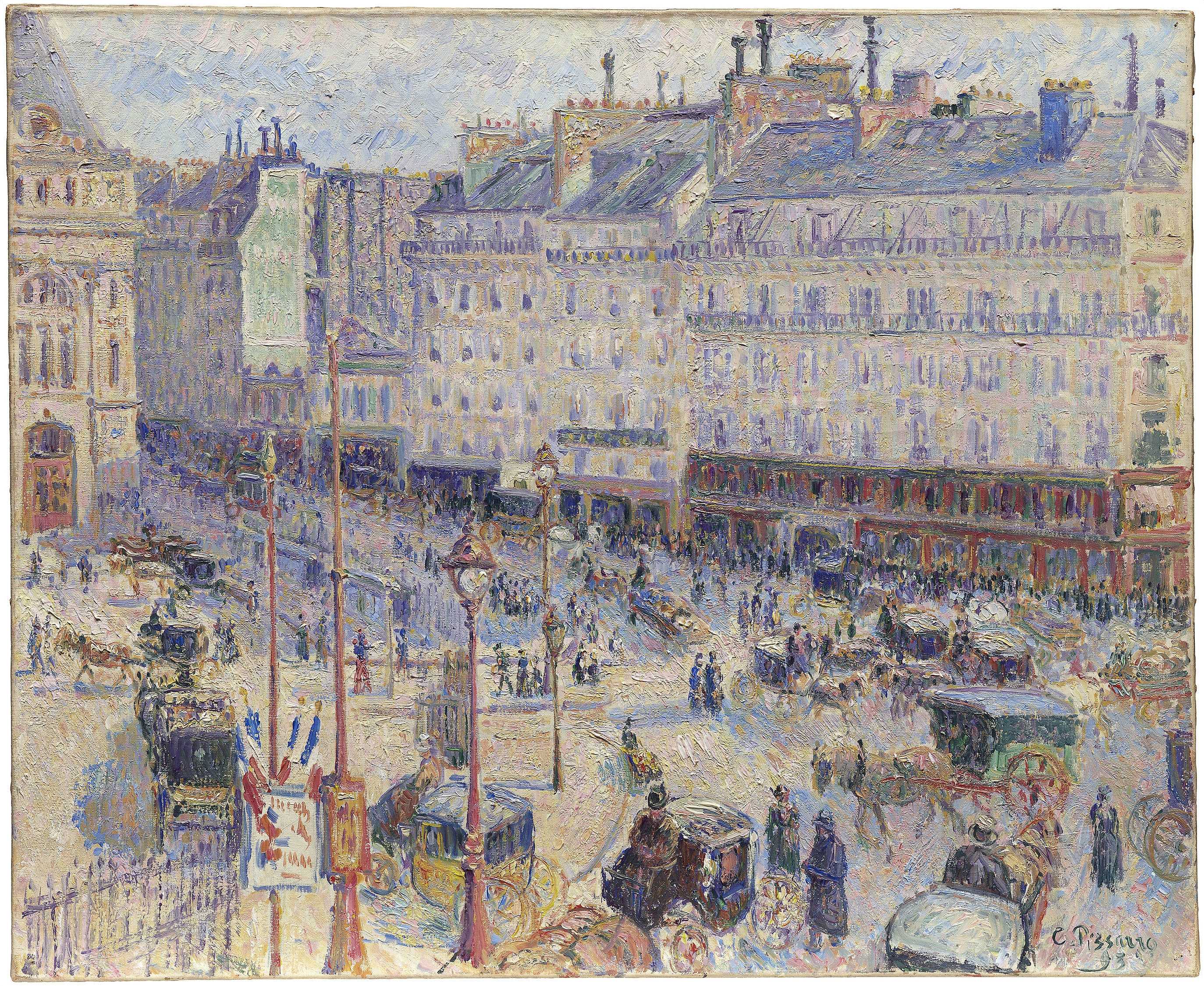
Place du Havre, Paris, 1893. Art Institute of Chicago

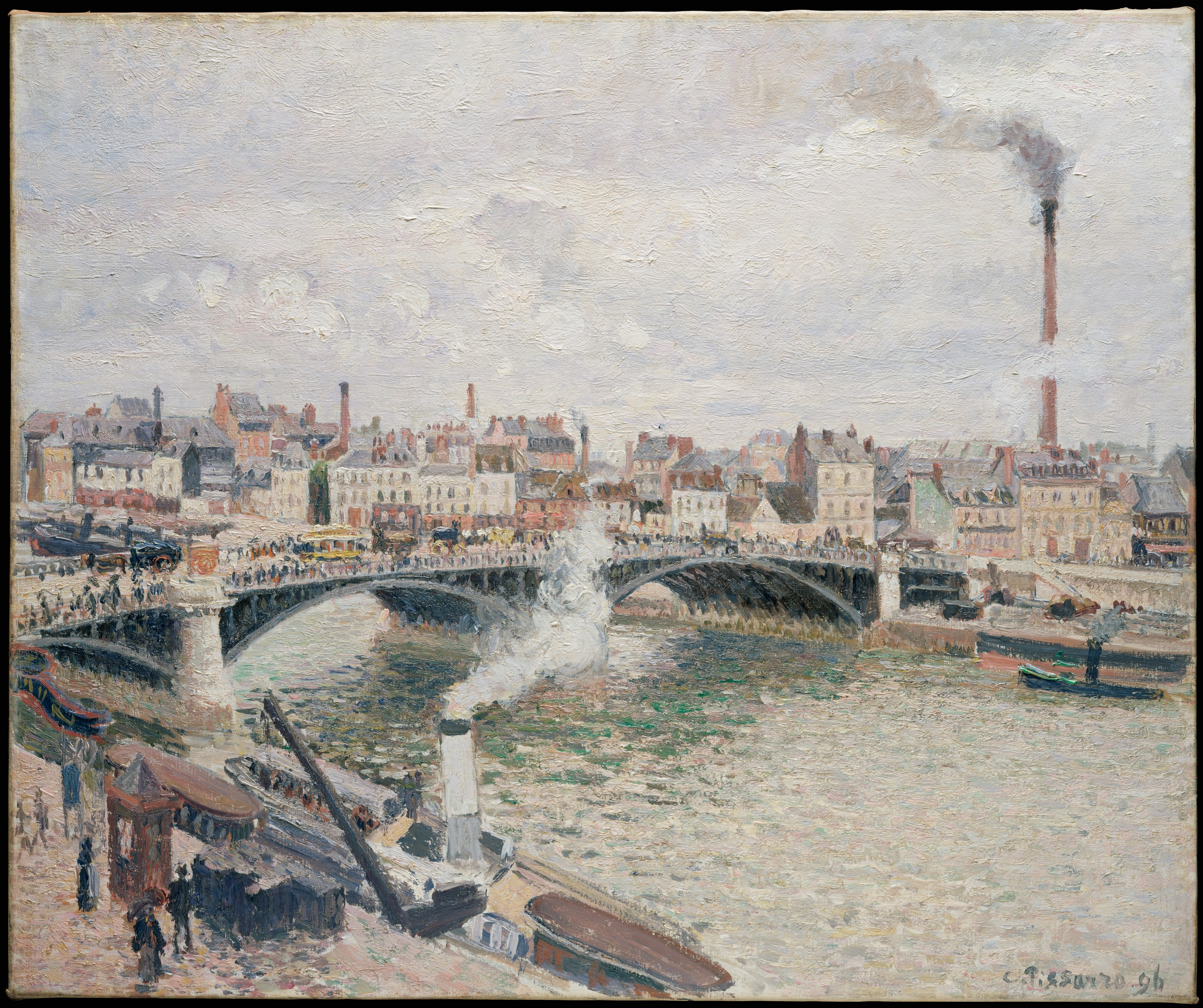
Morning, An Overcast Day, Rouen, 1896. Metropolitan Museum of Art, New York

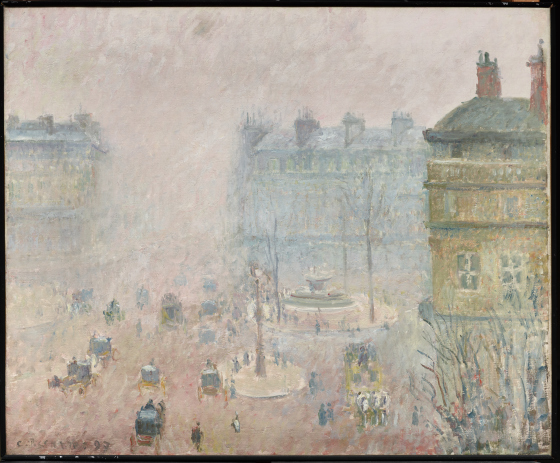
Place du Théâtre Français: Fog Effect, 1897. Dallas Museum of Art

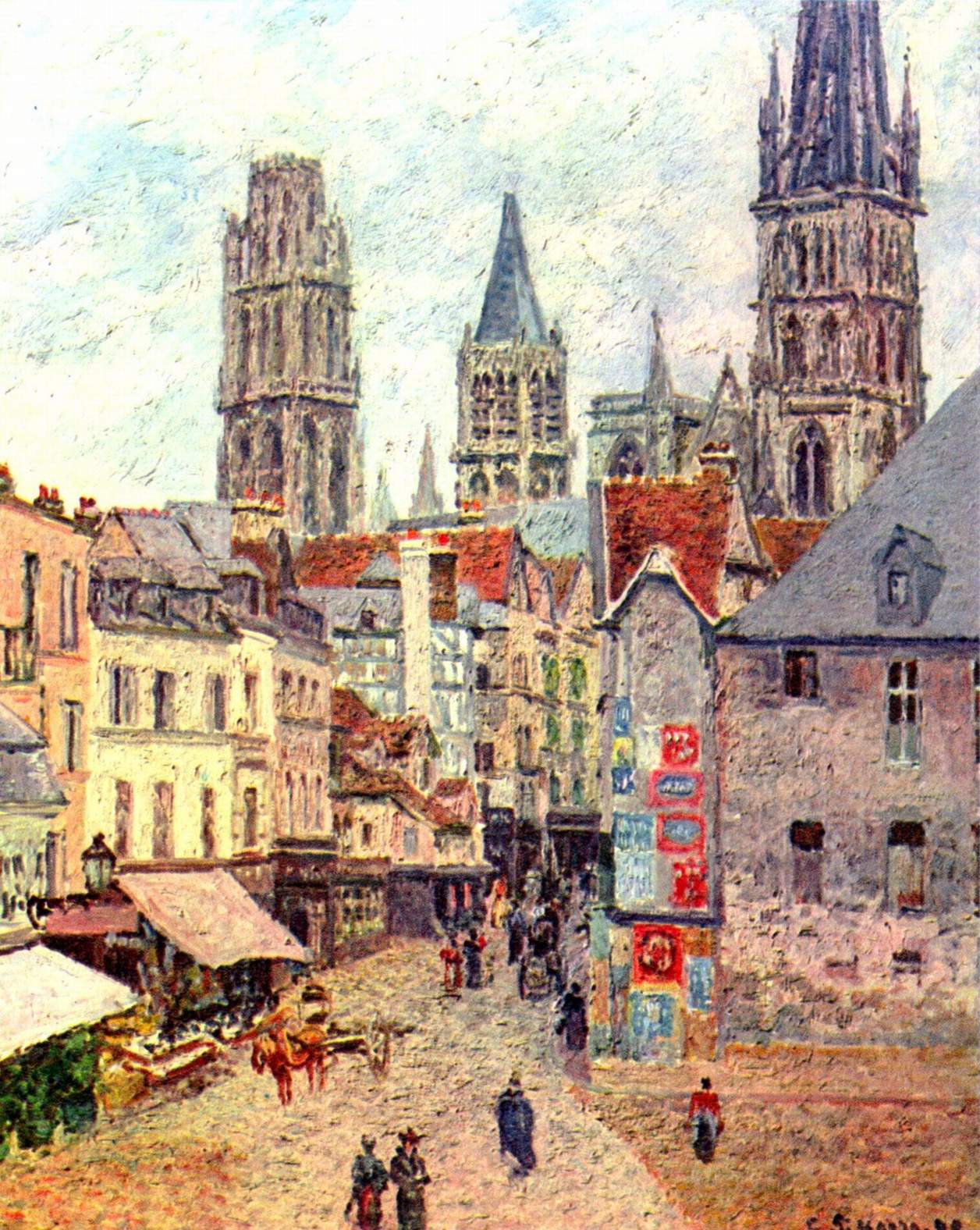
Rouen, Rue de l'Épicerie, 1898. Private Collection

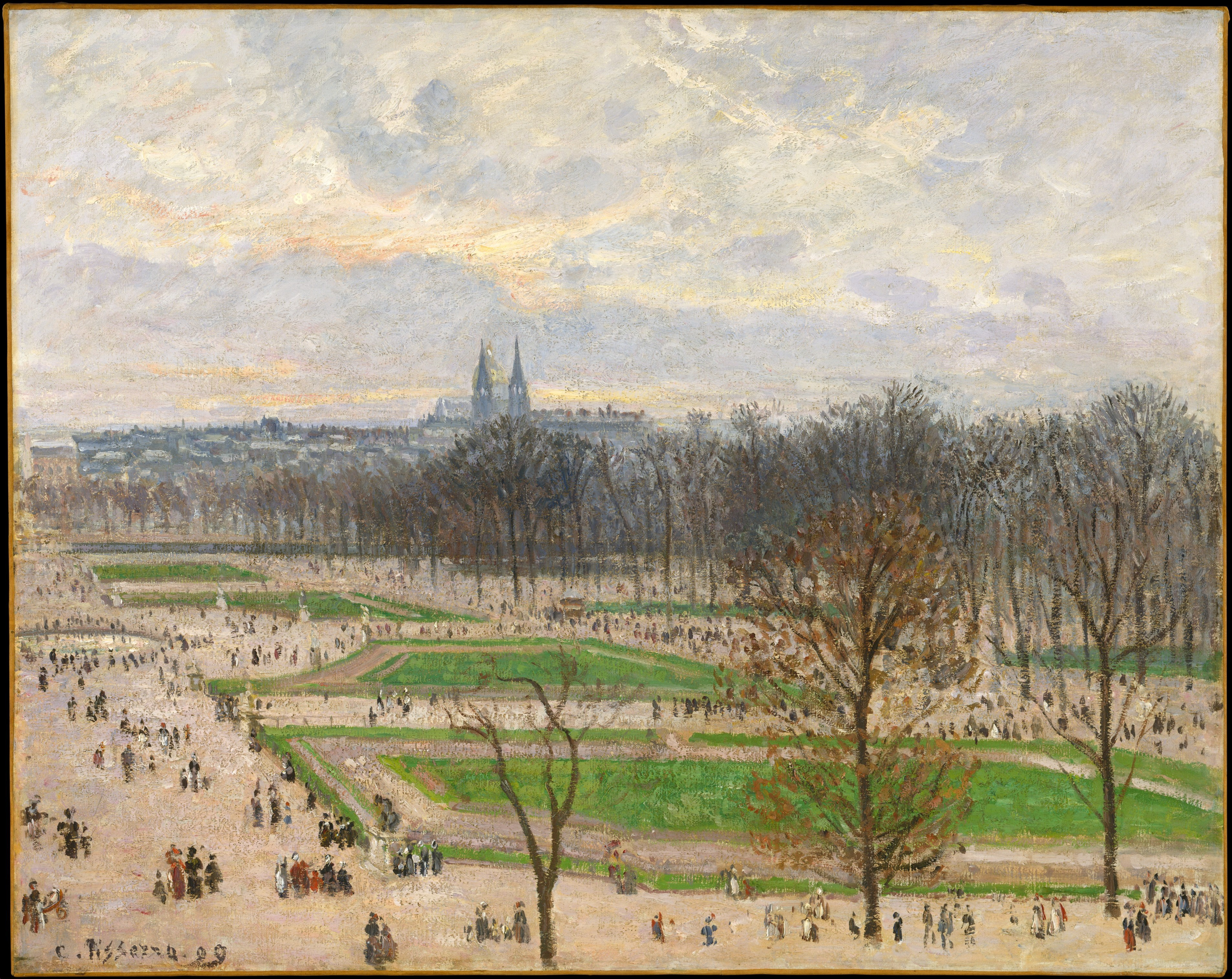
The Garden of the Tuileries on a Winter Afternoon, 1899, Metropolitan Museum of Art

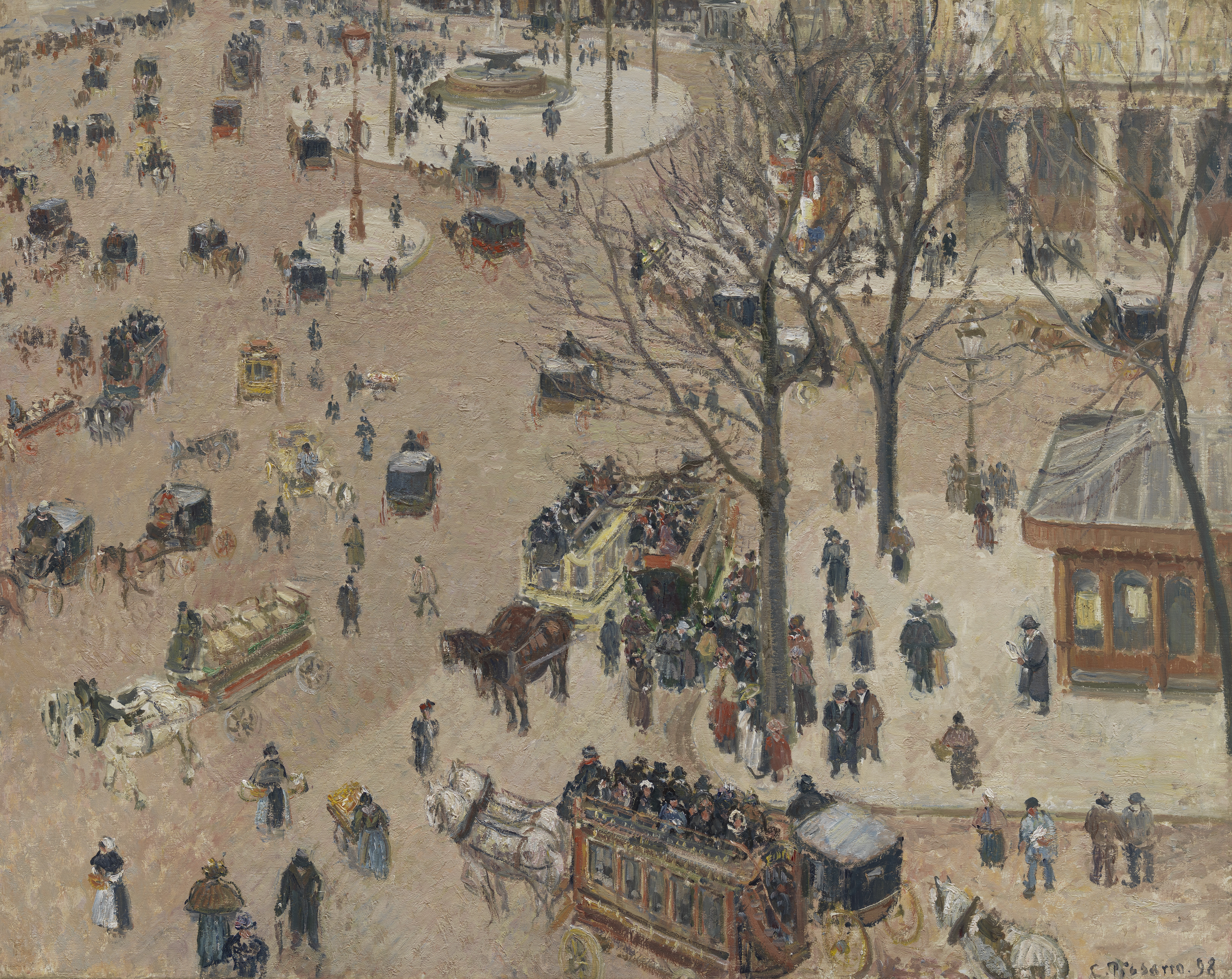
La Place du Théâtre Français, 1898. LACMA, Los Angeles

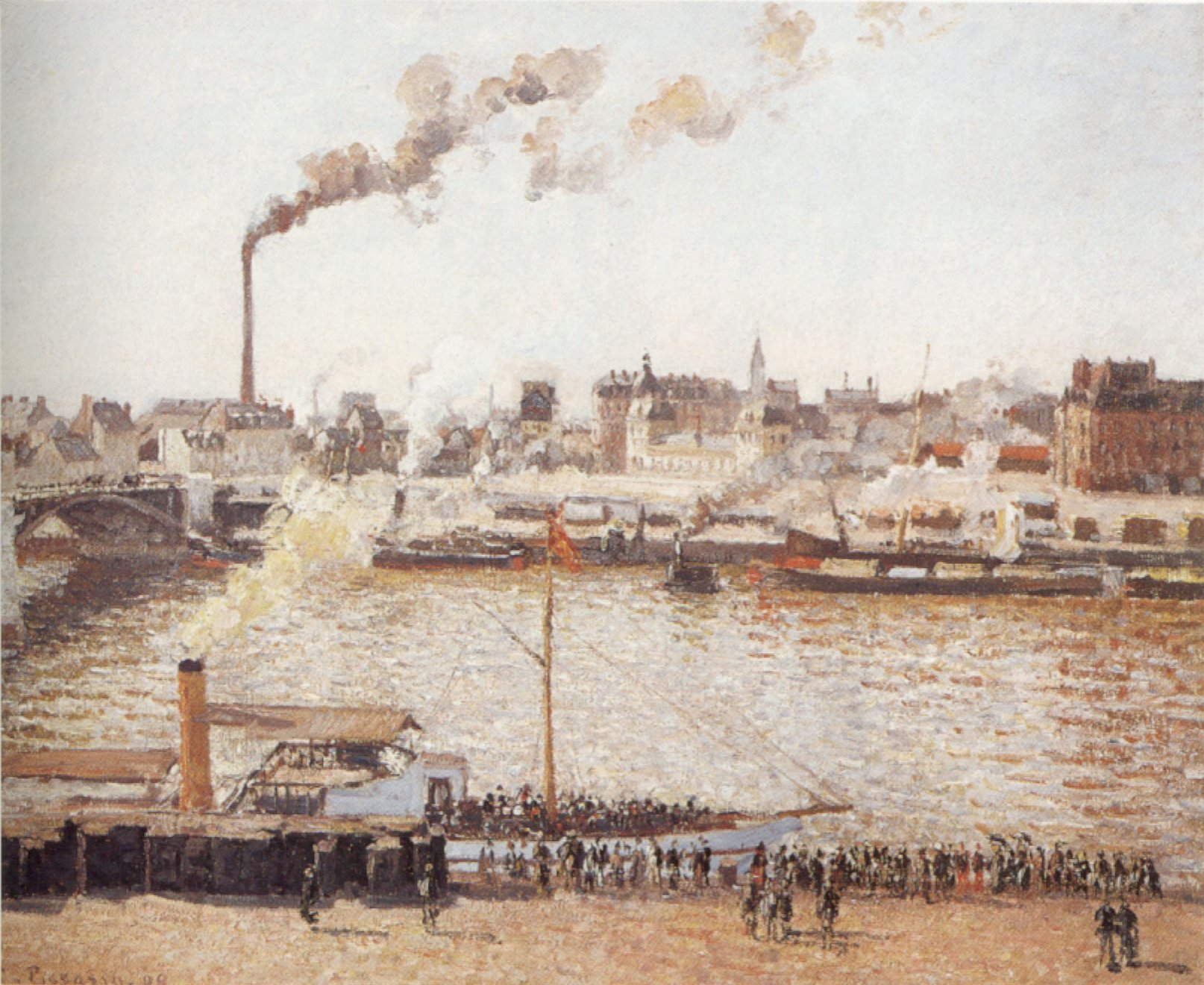
View of Rouen, 1898. Honolulu Museum of Art

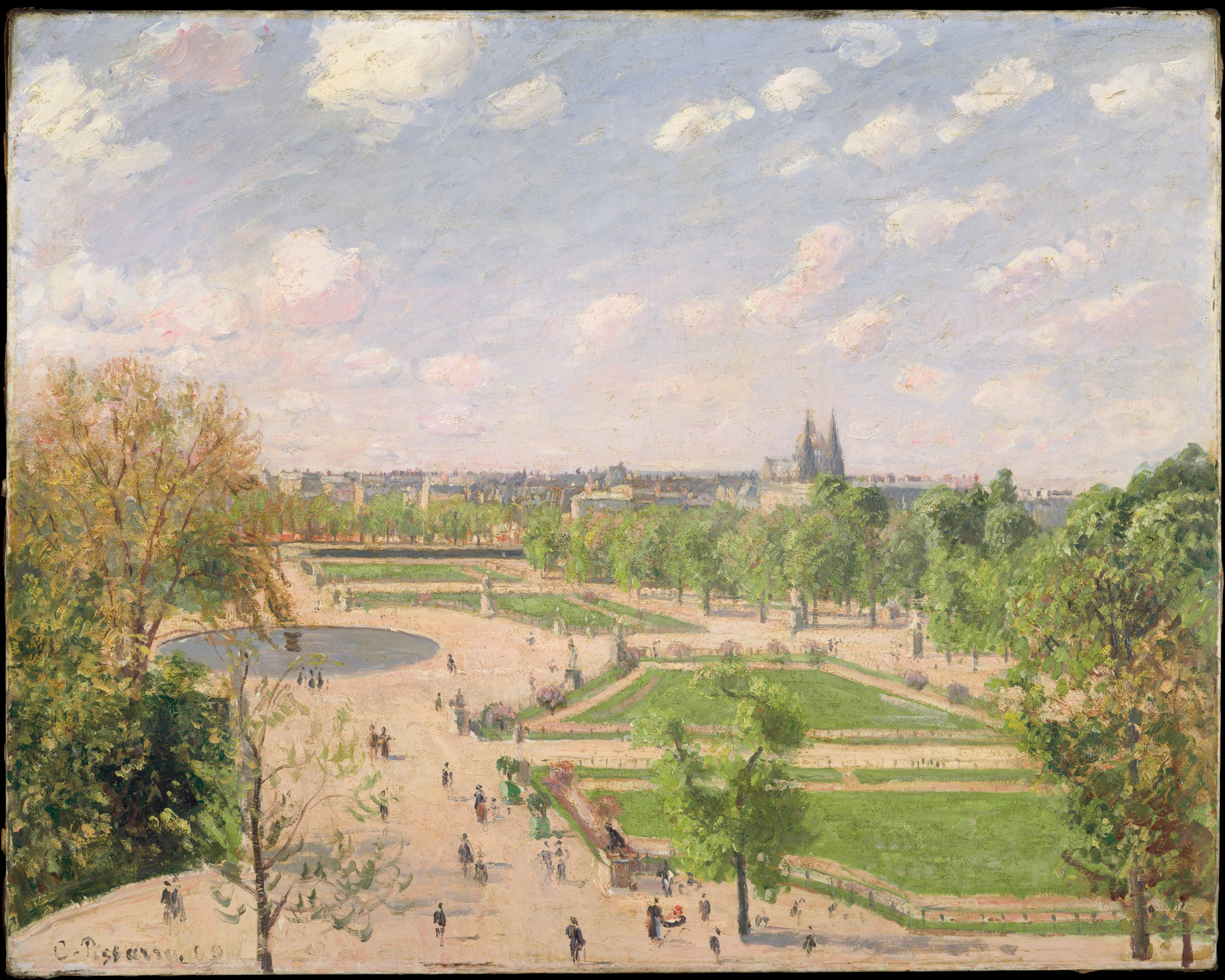
The Garden of the Tuileries on a Spring Morning, 1899. Metropolitan Museum of Art, New York

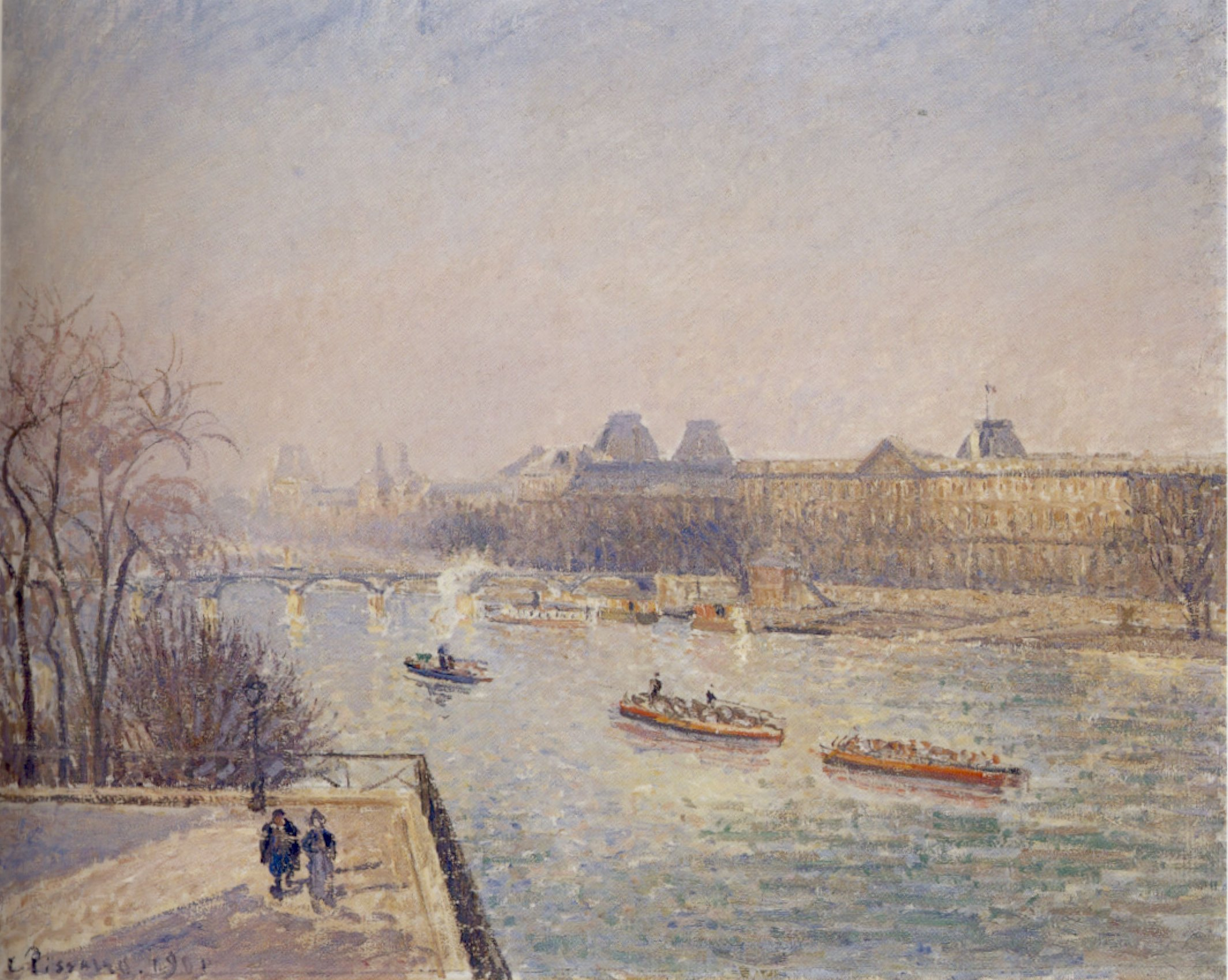
Morning, Winter Sunshine, Frost, the Pont-Neuf, the Seine, the Louvre, Soleil D'hiver Gella Blanc, c. 1901. Honolulu Museum of Art

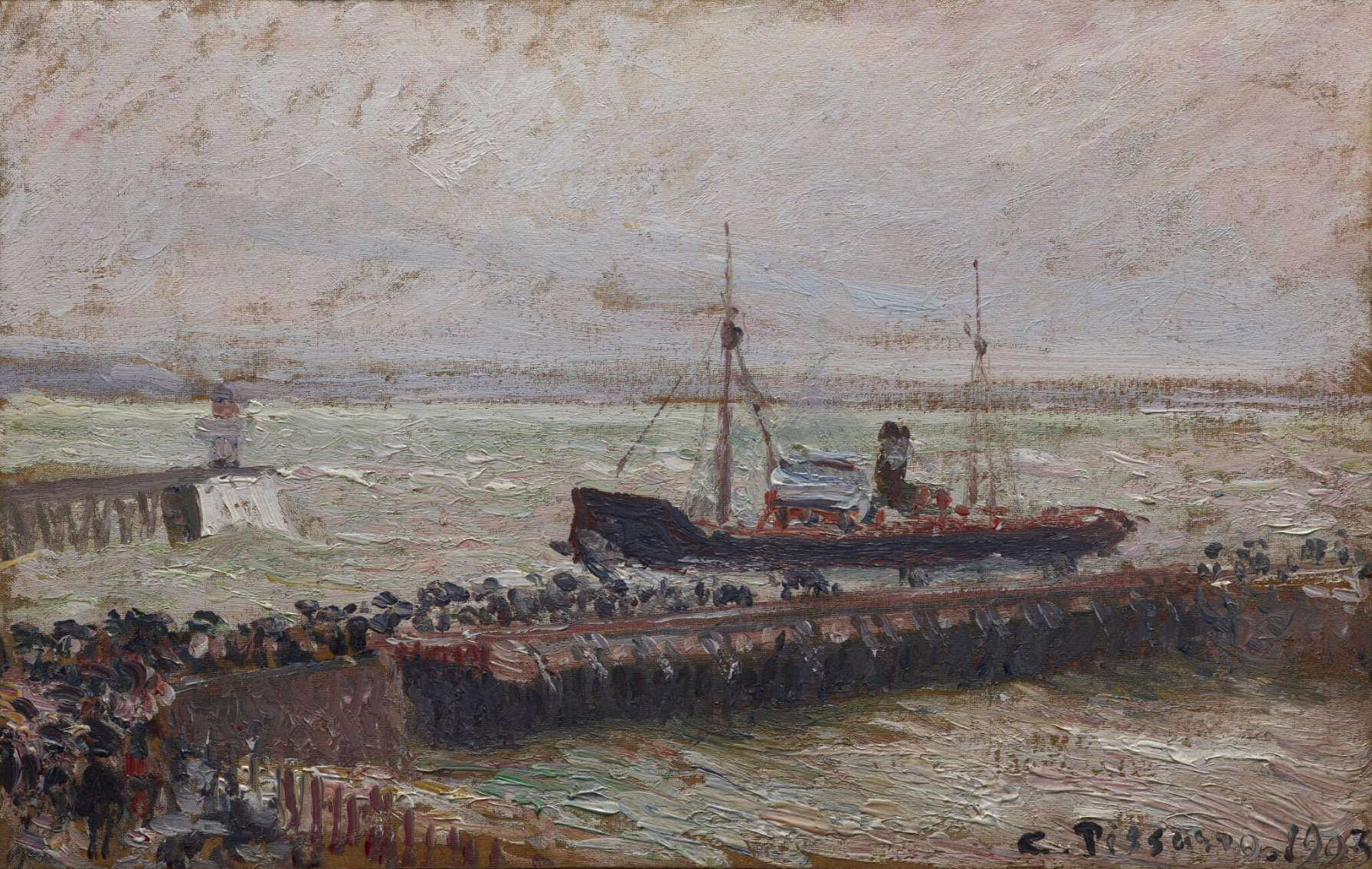
Ship entering the Harbor at Le Havre, 1903. Dallas Museum of Art

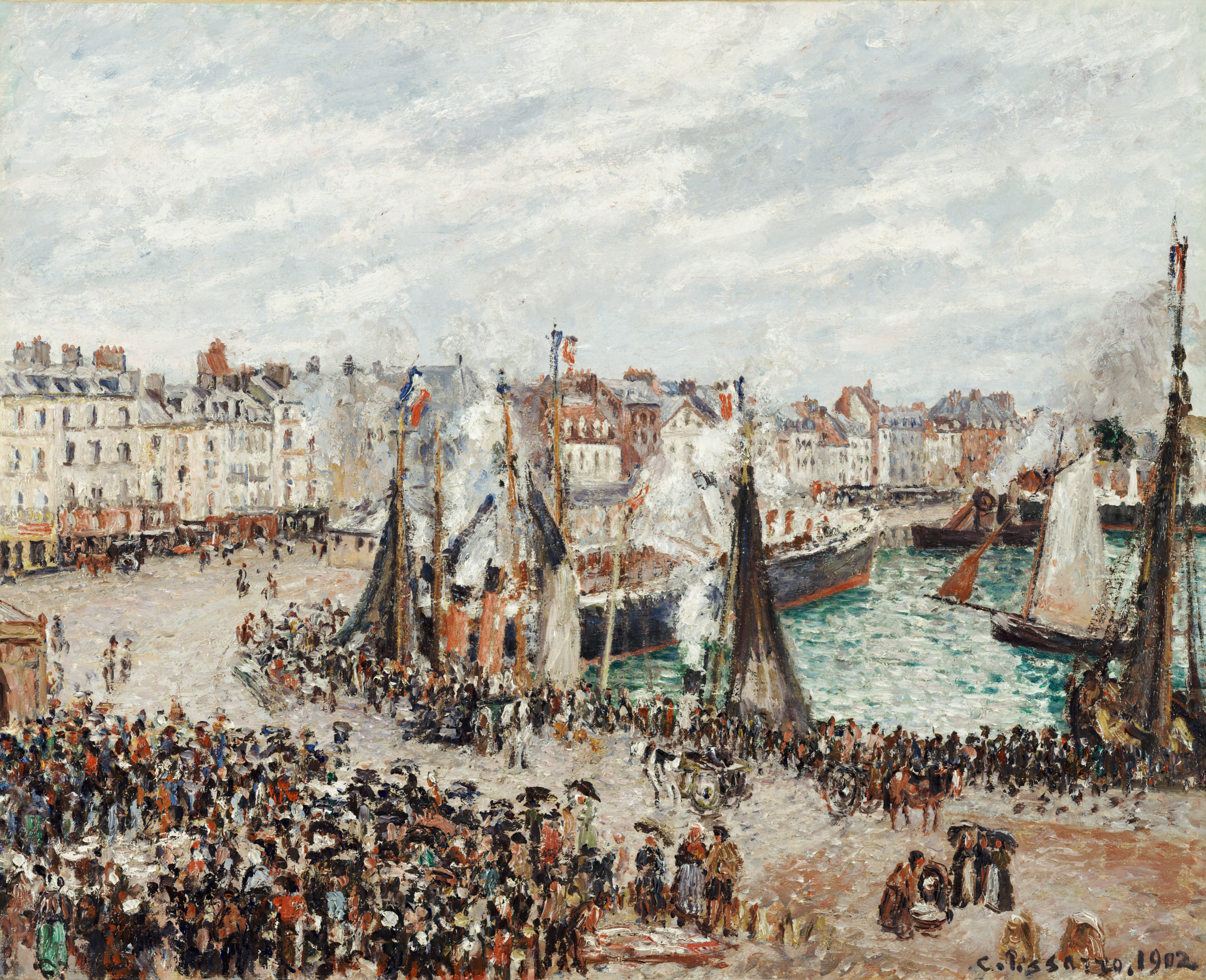
The Fish Market, Dieppe: Grey Weather, Morning, c 1902. Dallas Museum of Art

== Drawings and prints ==
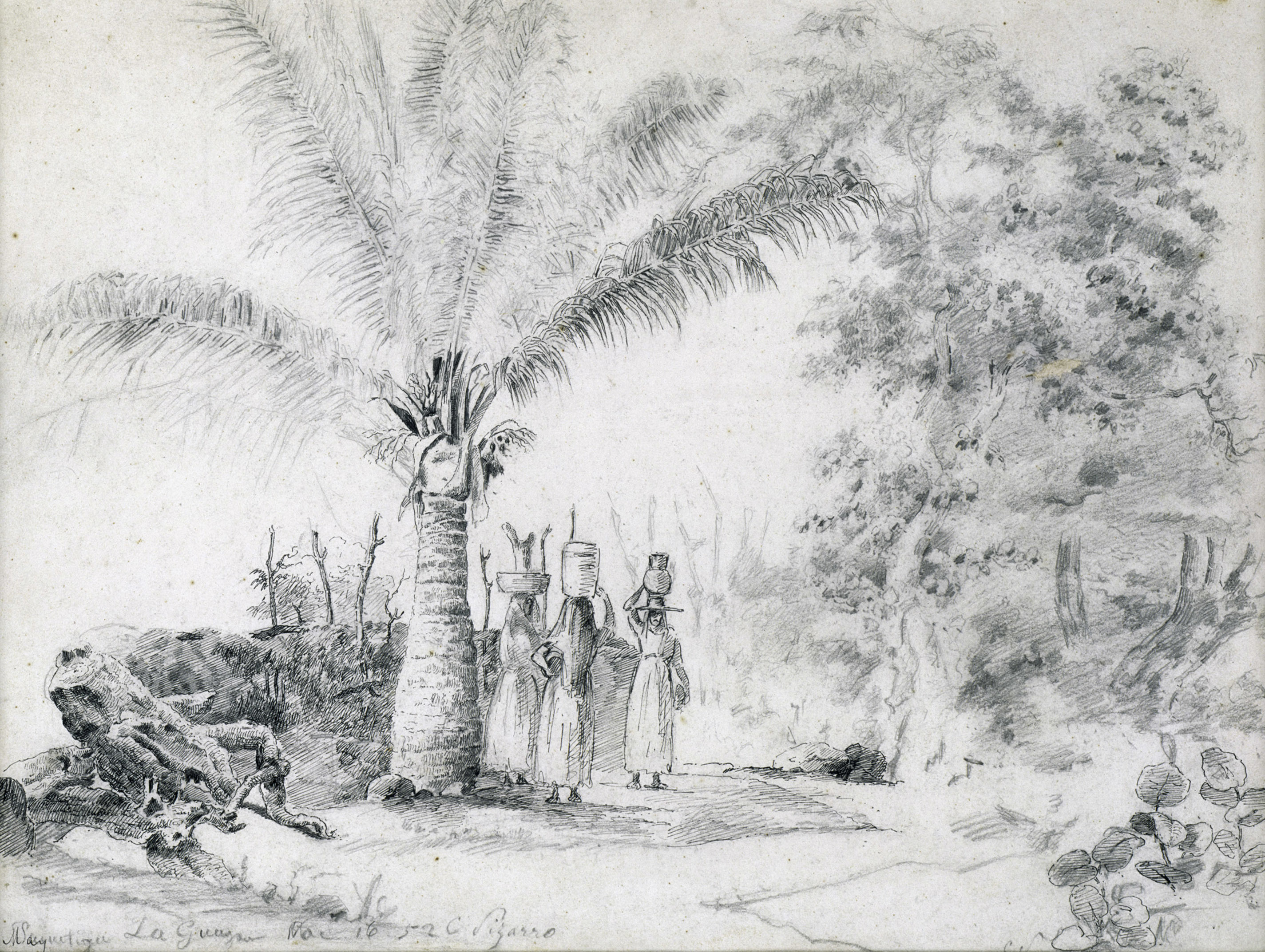
La Guaira, 1852–54, graphite and ink on paper

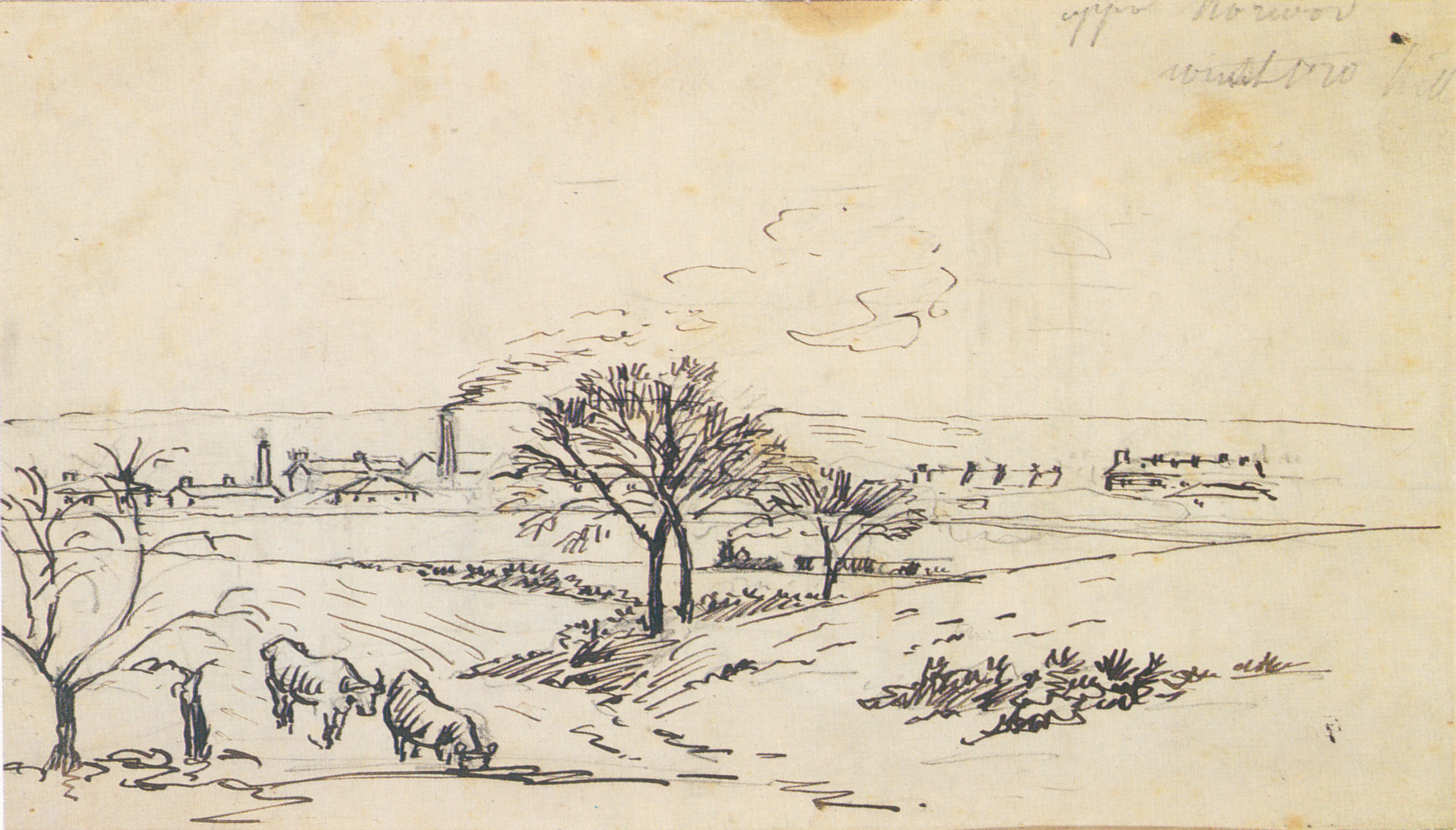
View from Upper Norwood, c. 1870, pen and brown ink over pencil on paper. Ashmolean Museum

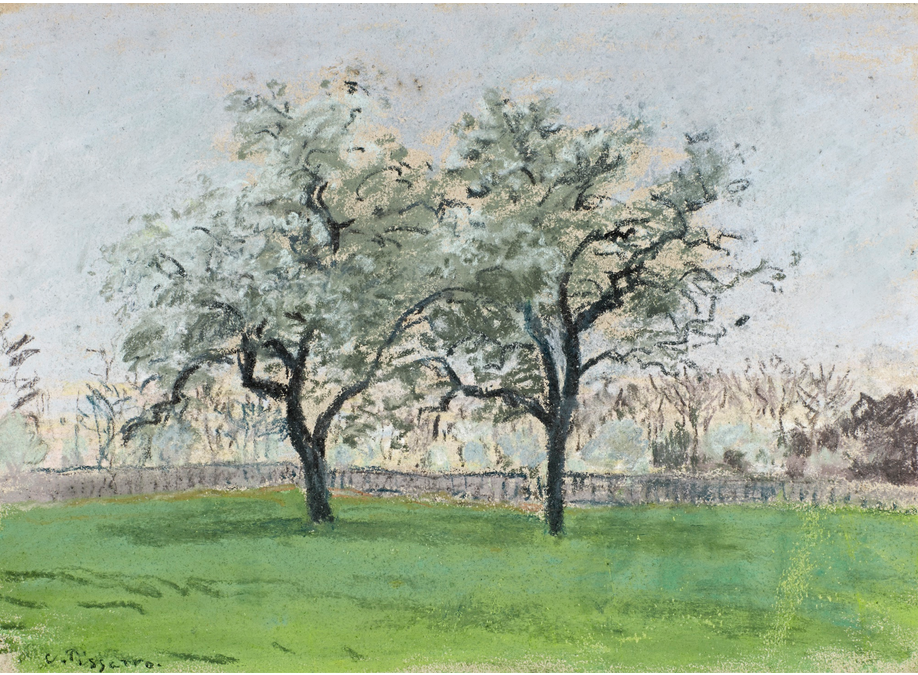
Apple Trees at Pontoise, c. 1872, pastel on paper

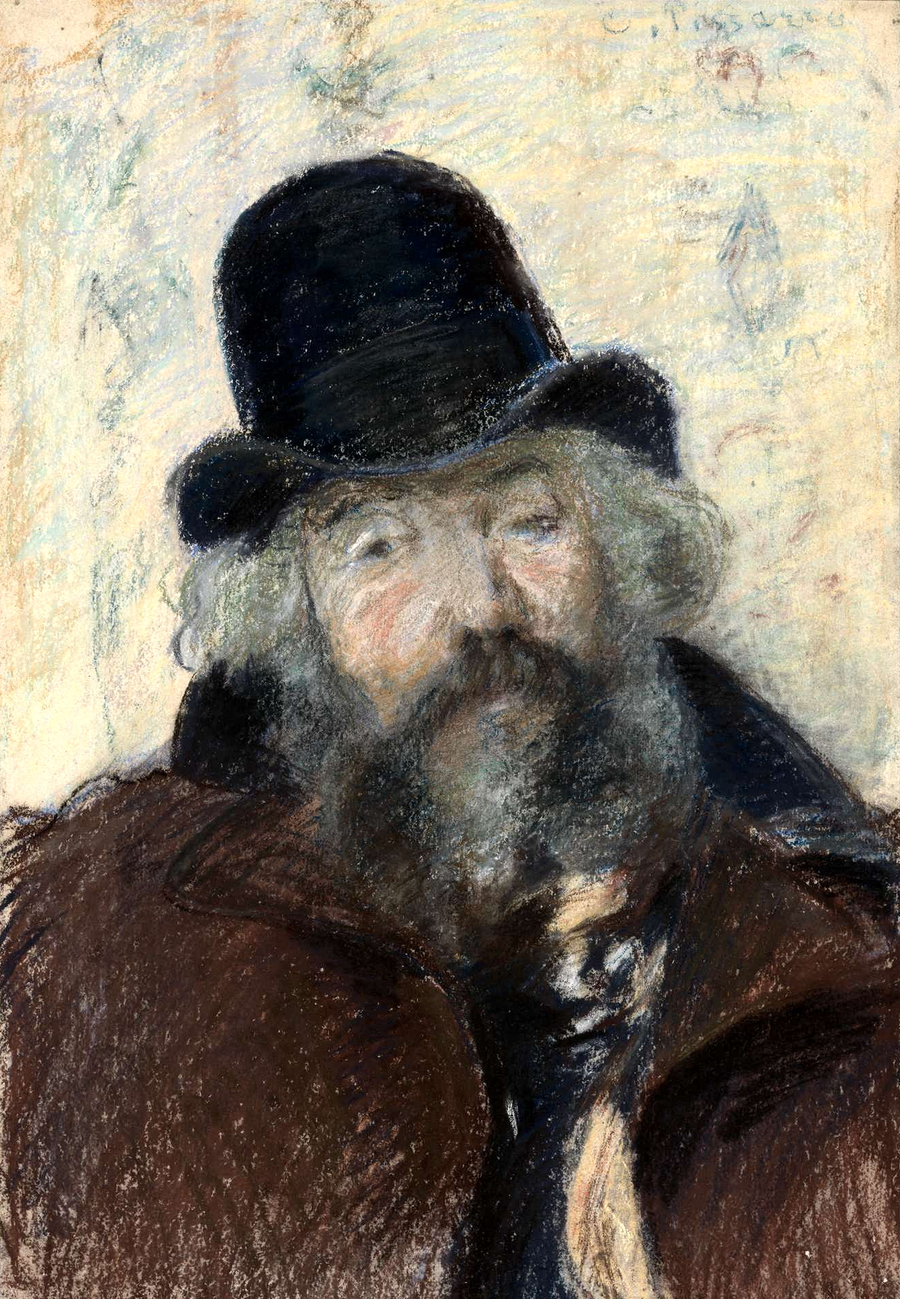
Portrait of Ludovic Piette, c. 1875, pastel on paper. Wildenstein Institute

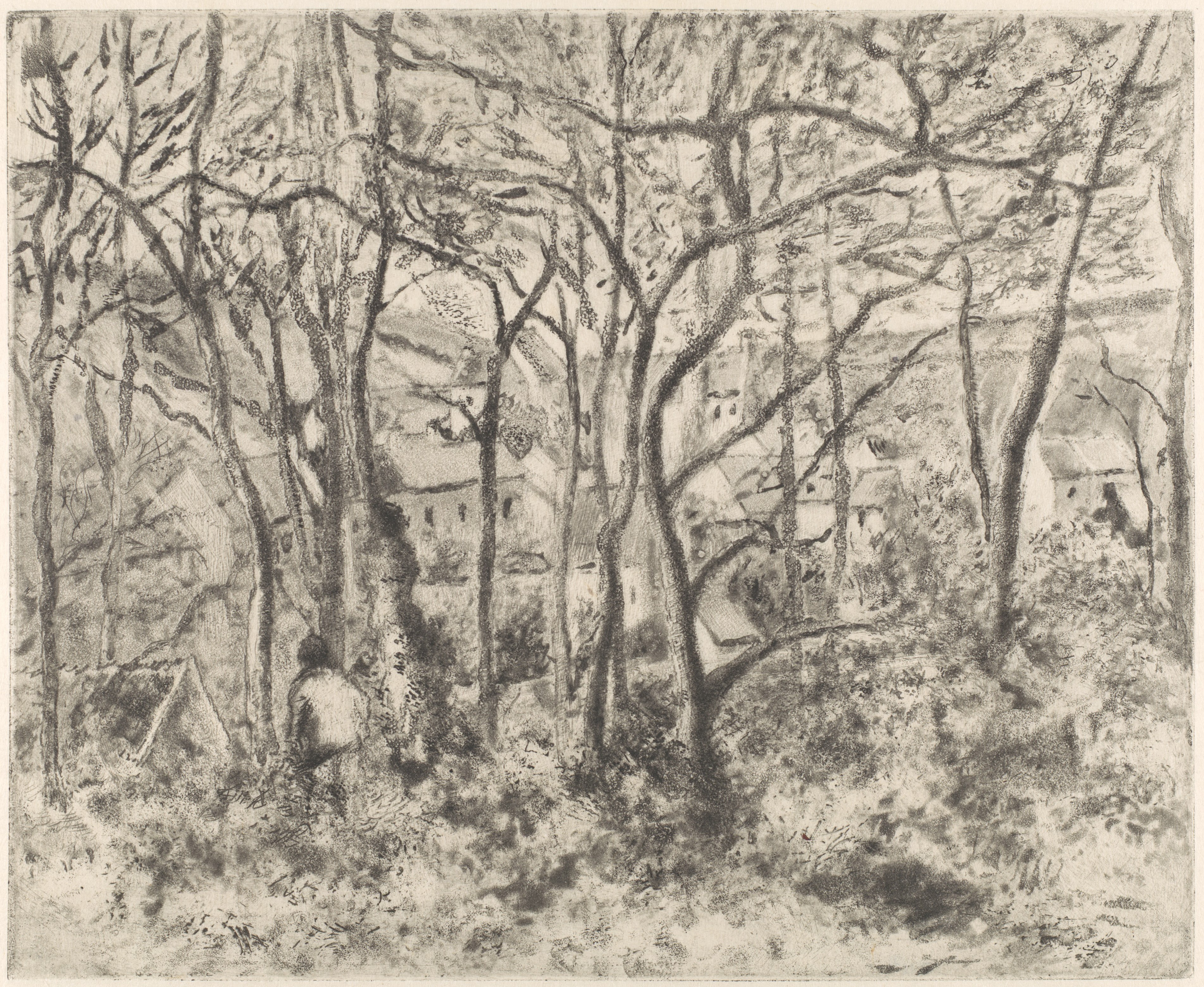
The Woods at L'Hermitage, Pontoise, 1879, softground etching, aquatint, and drypoint on china paper (sixth state). Metropolitan Museum of Art

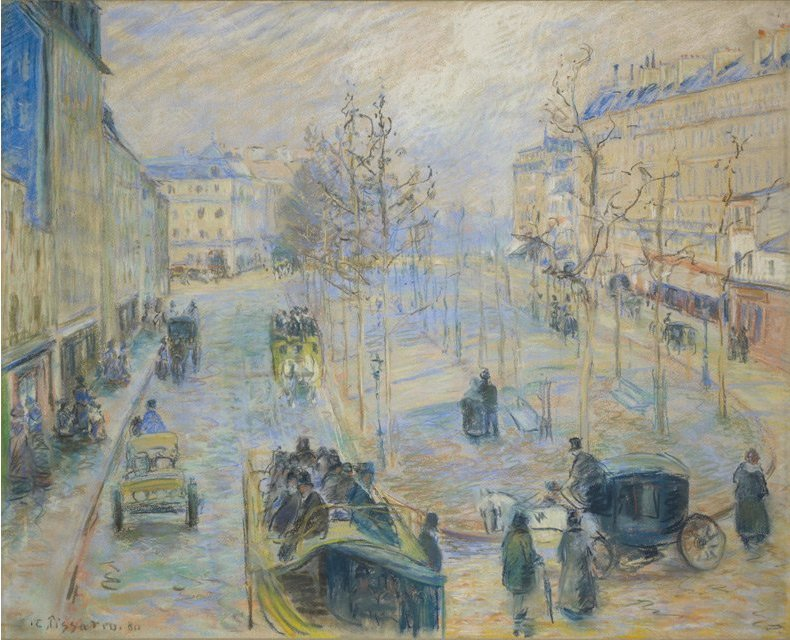
Boulevard de Rochechouart, 1880, pastel on beige wove paper

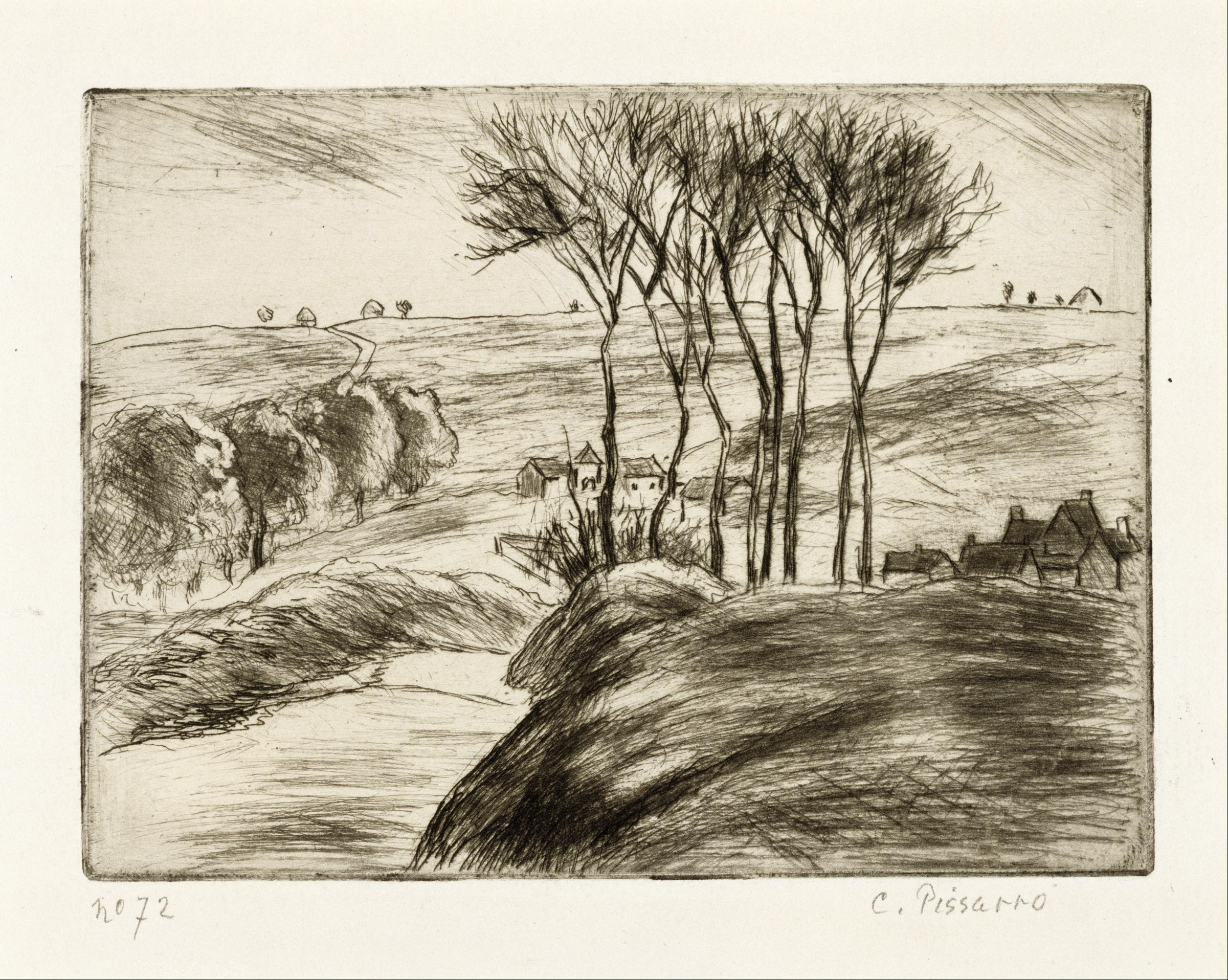
Landscape in Osny, 1887, etching on Holland paper. Museum of Fine Arts, Houston

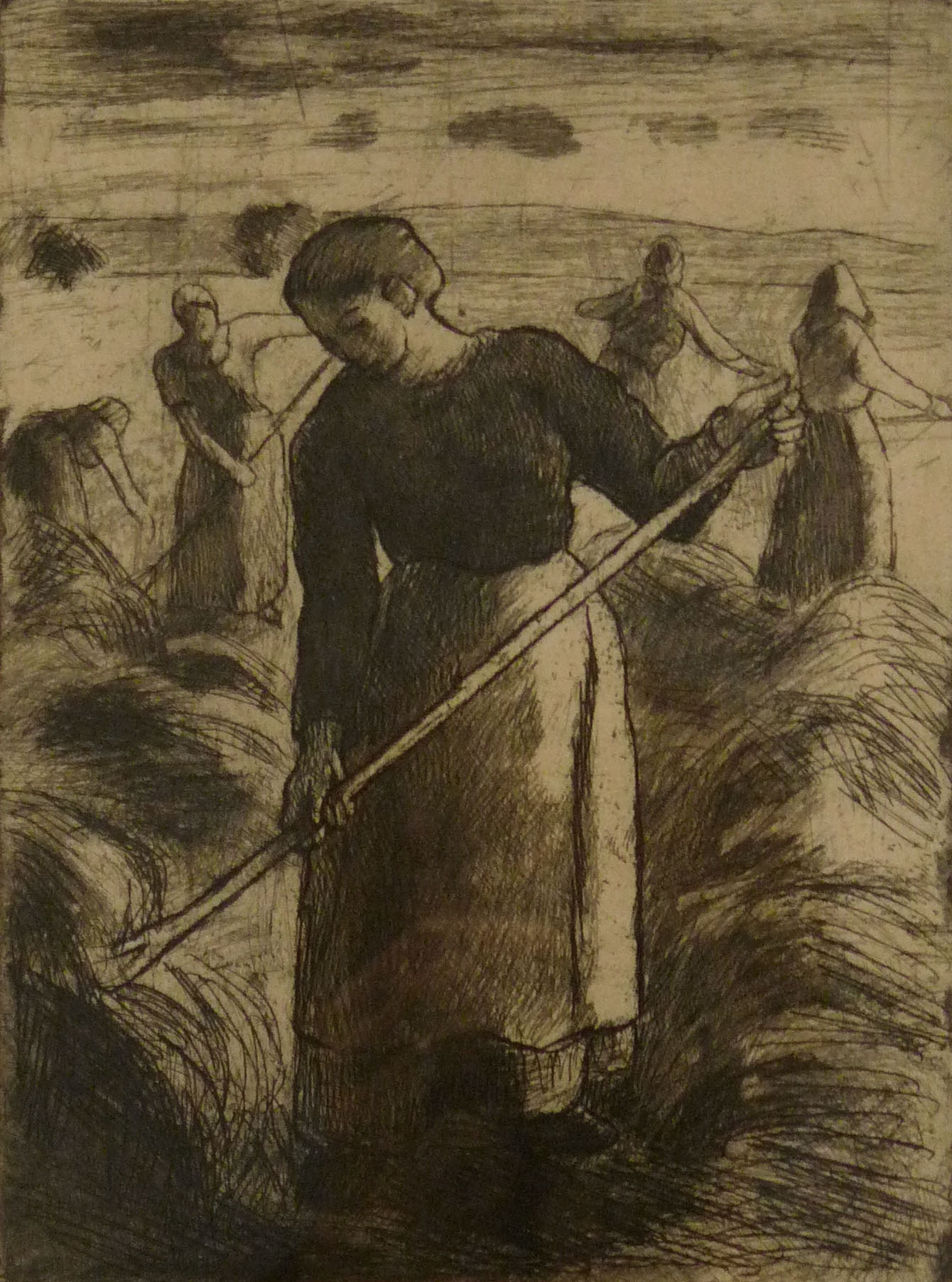
Tedders of Eragny (Faneuses d'Eragny), 1897, etching, aquatint and dry-point on paper. Strasbourg Museum of Modern and Contemporary Art

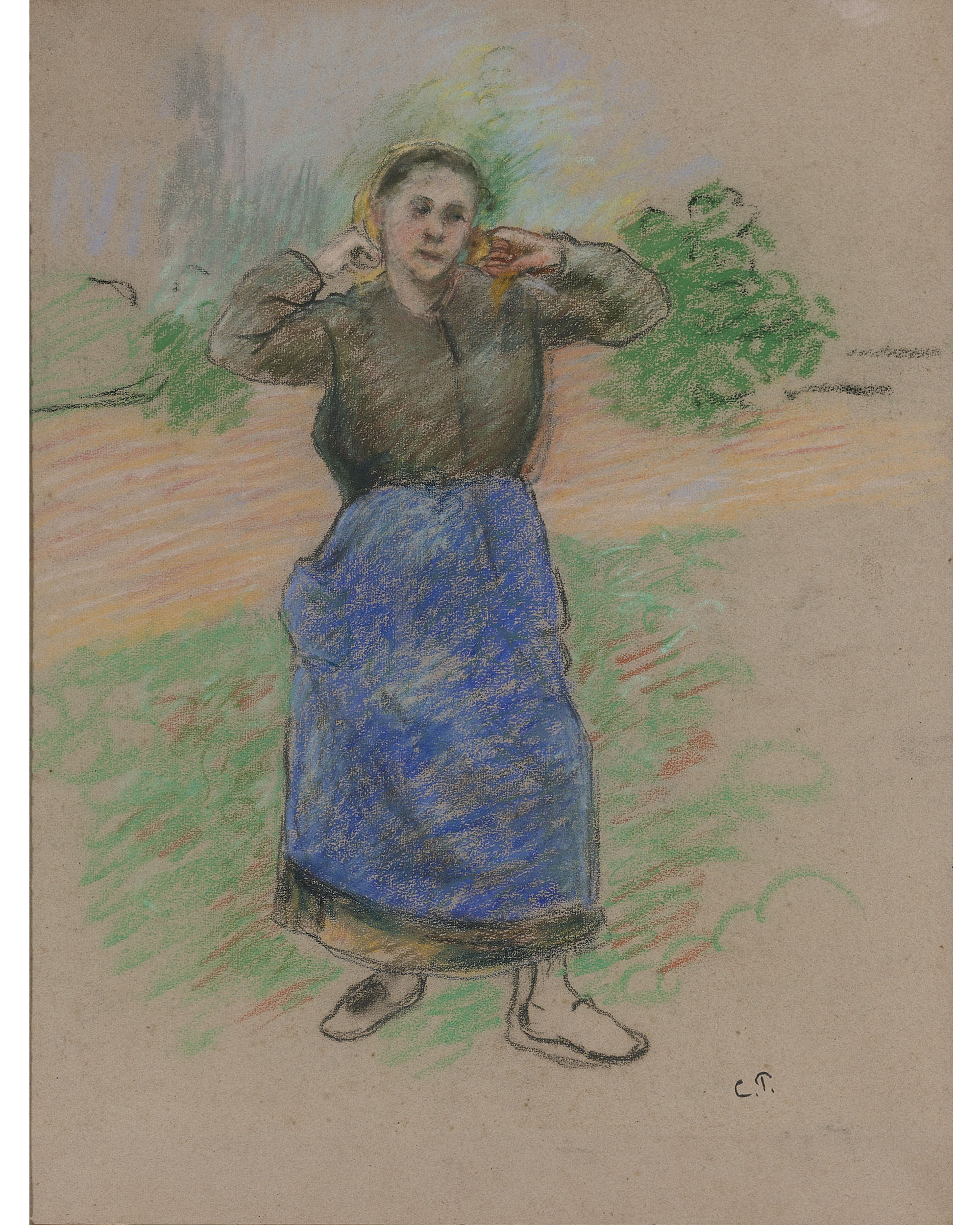
Paysanne Nouant son Foulard, 1882, pastel on paper

== List of paintings ==
- The Banks of the Oise near Pontoise, 1873, Indianapolis Museum of Art
- Pont Boieldieu in Rouen, Rainy Weather, 1896, Art Gallery of Ontario
- Steamboats in the Port of Rouen, 1896, Metropolitan Museum of Art
- Le Boulevard de Montmartre, matinée de printemps, view from window, 1897, private collection
- Bath Road, London, 1897, Ashmolean Museum
- Hay Harvest at Éragny, 1901, National Gallery of Canada
- Self-portrait, 1903, Tate Gallery, London
- Le Printemps, Paysannes dans un Champ, 1882, fan-shaped painting in gouache on silk, Private Collection
- Paysans Ramassant des Pommes, circa 1890, oil on panel

== See also ==
- List of paintings by Camille Pissarro
- Jewish culture
- List of claims for restitution for Nazi-looted art

== Bibliography ==
- Rewald, John, ed., with the assistance of Lucien Pissarro: Camille Pissarro, Lettres à son fils Lucien, Editions Albin Michel, Paris 1950; previously published, translated to English: Camille Pissarro, Letters to his son Lucien, New York 1943 & London 1944; 3rd revised edition, Paul P Appel Publishers, 1972 ISBN 0-911858-22-9
- Bailly-Herzberg, Janine, ed.: Correspondance de Camille Pissarro, 5 volumes, Presses Universitaires de France, Paris, 1980 & Editions du Valhermeil, Paris, 1986–1991 ISBN 2-13-036694-5 – ISBN 2-905684-05-4 – ISBN 2-905684-09-7 – ISBN 2-905684-17-8 – ISBN 2-905684-35-6
- DeLue, Rachael Ziady. "Pissarro, Landscape, Vision, and Tradition", The Art Bulletin, vol. 80, no. 4, Dec. 1998, p. 718, https://doi.org/10.2307/3051320.
- Herbert, Robert L. "Artists and Anarchism: Unpublished Letters of Pissarro, Signac and Others – II", The Burlington Magazine, vol. 102, no. 693, 1960, pp. 517–22. JSTOR, http://www.jstor.org/stable/873160.
- Hubert van den Berg. "Pissarro and Anarchism", History Workshop, no. 32, 1991, pp. 226–28. JSTOR, http://www.jstor.org/stable/4289126.
- Mathews, Nancy Mowll (1994). Mary Cassatt: A Life. New York: Villard Books. ISBN 978-0-394-58497-3. LCCN 98-8028.
- Thomson, Richard. "Camille Pissarro's 'Turpitudes Sociales' Revisited, Part I: Politics, Caricature and Family Tensions in 1889", The Burlington Magazine, vol. 142, no. 1169, 2000, pp. i–478, https://www.jstor.org/stable/pdf/43858729.pdf.
- Thorold, Anne & Erickson, Kristen. Camille Pissarro and His Family, Ashmolean Museum, 2006 ISBN 1-854-44032-2
- Thorold, Anne, ed.: The Letters of Lucien to Camille Pissarro 1883–1903, Cambridge University Press, Cambridge, New York & Oakleigh, 1993 ISBN 0-521-39034-6
