= The House of the Deaf Woman and the Belfry at Eragny =

Painting by Camille Pissarro

- La Maison de la Sourde et Le Clocher d'Eragny (French)
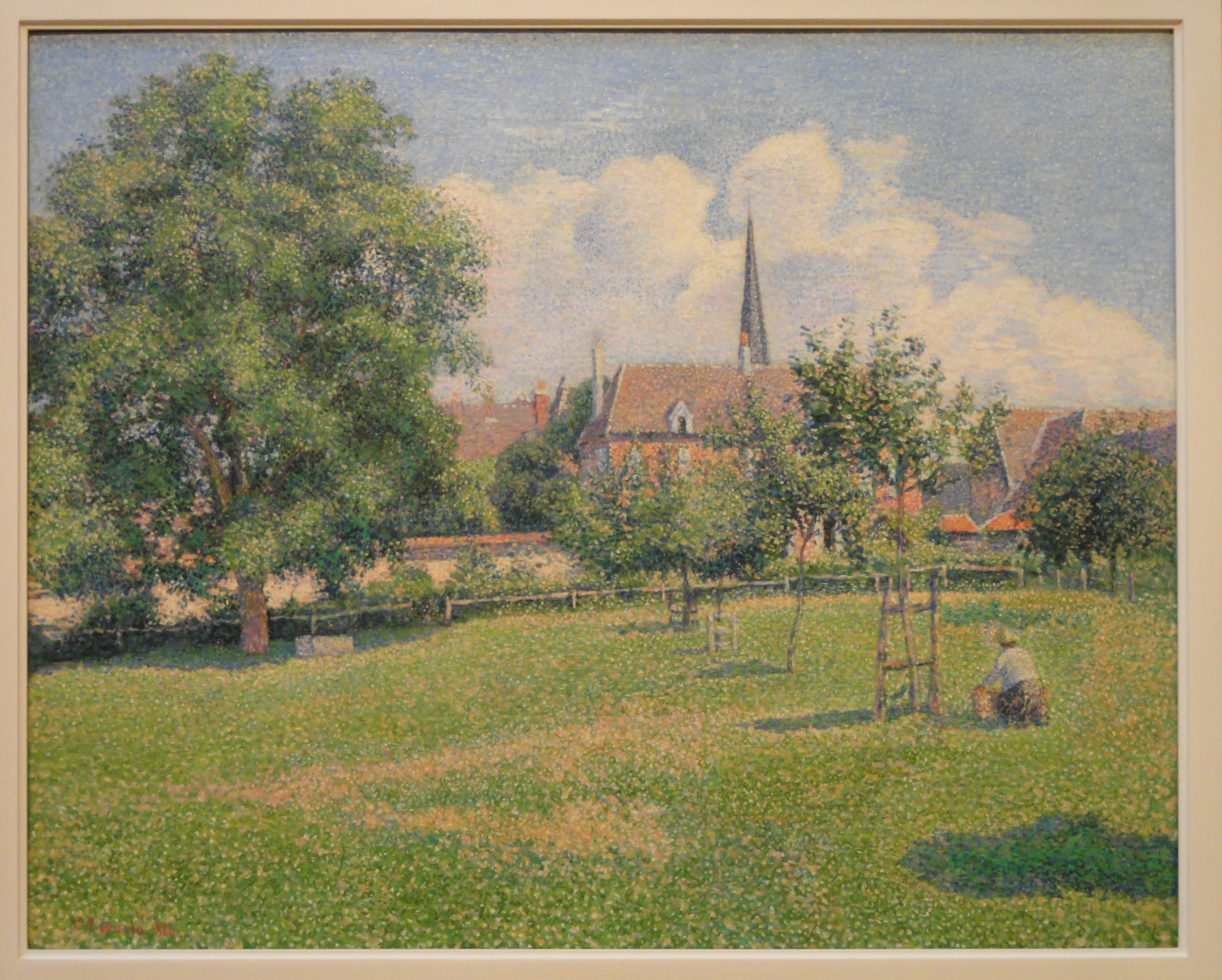
- Artist: Camille Pissarro
- Year: 1886
- Type: Oil painting on canvas
- Dimensions: 65.09 cm × 80.96 cm (25.625 in × 31.875 in)
- Location: Indianapolis Museum of Art, Indianapolis

The House of the Deaf Woman and the Belfry at Eragny is an 1886 oil painting by French artist Camille Pissarro, located in the Indianapolis Museum of Art, which is in Indianapolis, Indiana. It is a view of Pissarro's neighbor's yard in Eragny, created during his brief period of experimentation with pointillism.

== Description ==
This painting depicts Pissarro's neighbor's yard, with her brick house and the steeple of the parish church rising behind it. It is one of Pissarro's best pointillist images, with the most consistent brushwork and a fine grasp of the color theory of Neo-Impressionism. Deep green, violet, and blue in the shadows contrast with dots of rose, orange, and yellow to recreate the brilliant summer sun. Pissarro's great-grandson Joachim Pissarro, an art historian, declared that in this painting he "manages to blend his abiding respect for the new technical rules with a sense of freedom and spontaneity. The pulverizing chromatic effect of this new technique is extraordinary light, dazzling colors ... a brilliant energy that seems to radiate from the canvas." The frame is a reproduction of the original, balancing Pissarro's preference for white with his dealer's insistence upon gold.

== Historical information ==
In the fall of 1885, Pissarro met Georges Seurat and became enamored of his novel Neo-Impressionism. He considered Seurat's principles, derived from research on optics, to be the logical extension of the Impressionism for which he himself was most famous, and so adopted Seurat's revolutionary methods over the protests of his colleagues and dealer. The House of the Deaf Woman and the Belfry at Eragny was painted in the summer of 1886, at the height of Pissarro's enthusiasm. He was proud of the painting, submitting it to multiple prestigious exhibitions in 1887. However, by 1889 he had wearied of the labor-intensive technique and returned to Impressionism. Thus, this canvas is triply precious for its size, quality, and rarity.

== Acquisition ==
In 2002, the generosity of an anonymous museum patron allowed the IMA to purchase this valuable painting from a private European collection. It had not been seen in public since 1918, and had never been on view in the USA. Chief curator Ellen Lee estimated that its value was in the millions, calling it "the largest gift for an individual object the museum has had." The painting was so little-known that the art dealer who sold it to Lee insisted upon coming to Indianapolis with a color photograph, rather than letting her base her decision on a black and white reproduction from a book of Pissarro's work. His tactic worked since Lee recalls gasping upon first seeing the image. Lee traveled to Normandy for additional research, and found the scene remained much as Pissarro has painted it; the house and church are still standing. The painting is currently on view in the Robert H. & Ina M. Mohlman Gallery and has the accession number 2002.76.

== See also ==
- List of paintings by Camille Pissarro
- Hay Harvest at Éragny
