= Steamboats in the Port of Rouen =

Painting by Camille Pissarro

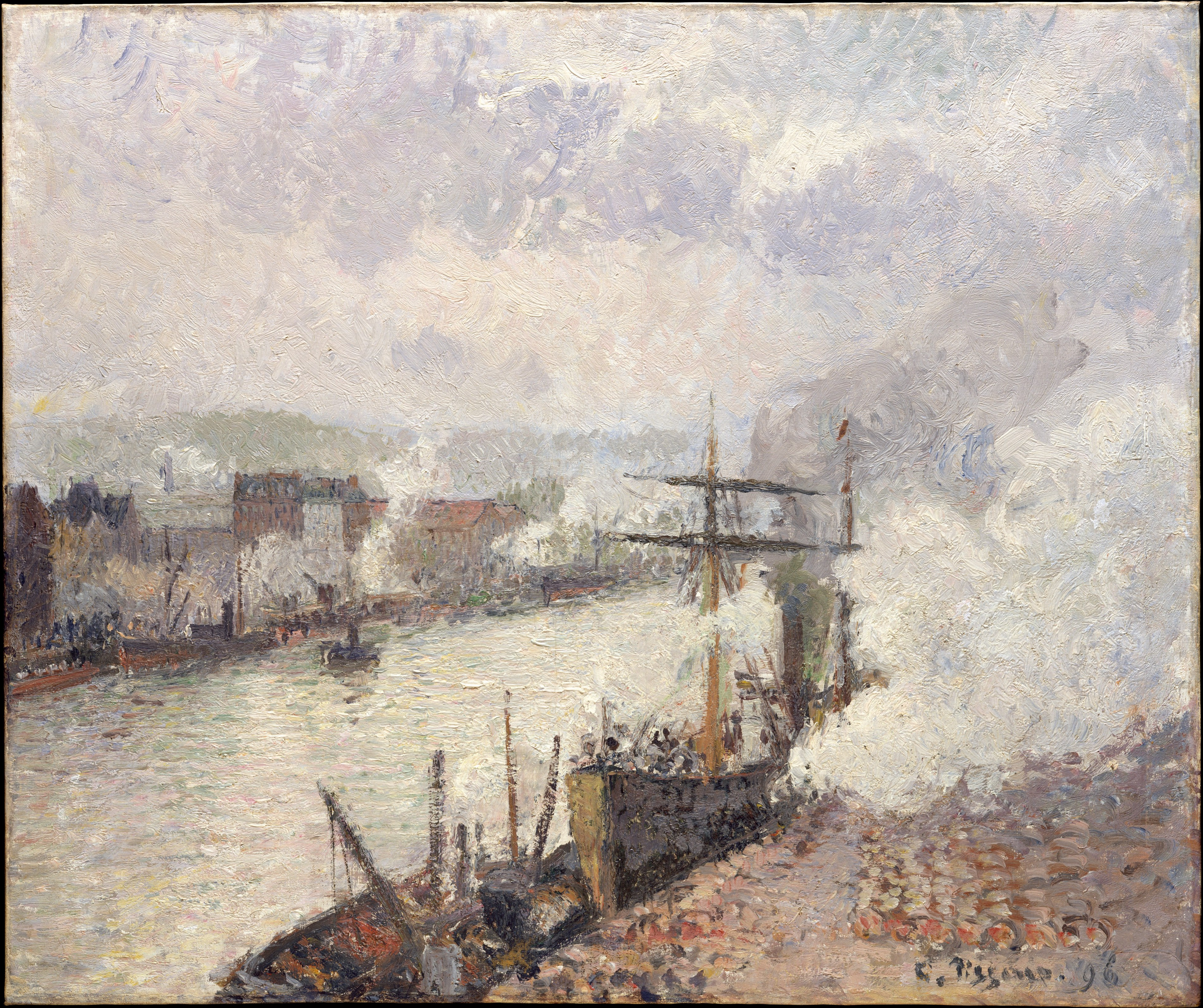
- Artist: Camille Pissarro
- Year: 1896
- Medium: Oil on canvas
- Dimensions: 45.7 cm × 54.6 cm (18.0 in × 21.5 in)
- Location: Metropolitan Museum of Art, New York City
- Accession: 58.133

Steamboats in the Port of Rouen is a late 19th-century painting by Camille Pissarro. The oil-on-canvas painting depicts shipping in the port city of Rouen, France. Pissarro painted the work from his room in the Hôtel de Paris, which overlooked one of the city's quays. The painting is similar to Pissarro's Morning, An Overcast Day, Rouen, and both works are in the collection of the Metropolitan Museum of Art, in New York City.

== See also ==
- List of paintings by Camille Pissarro
