= The Banks of the Oise near Pontoise =

Painting by Camille Pissarro

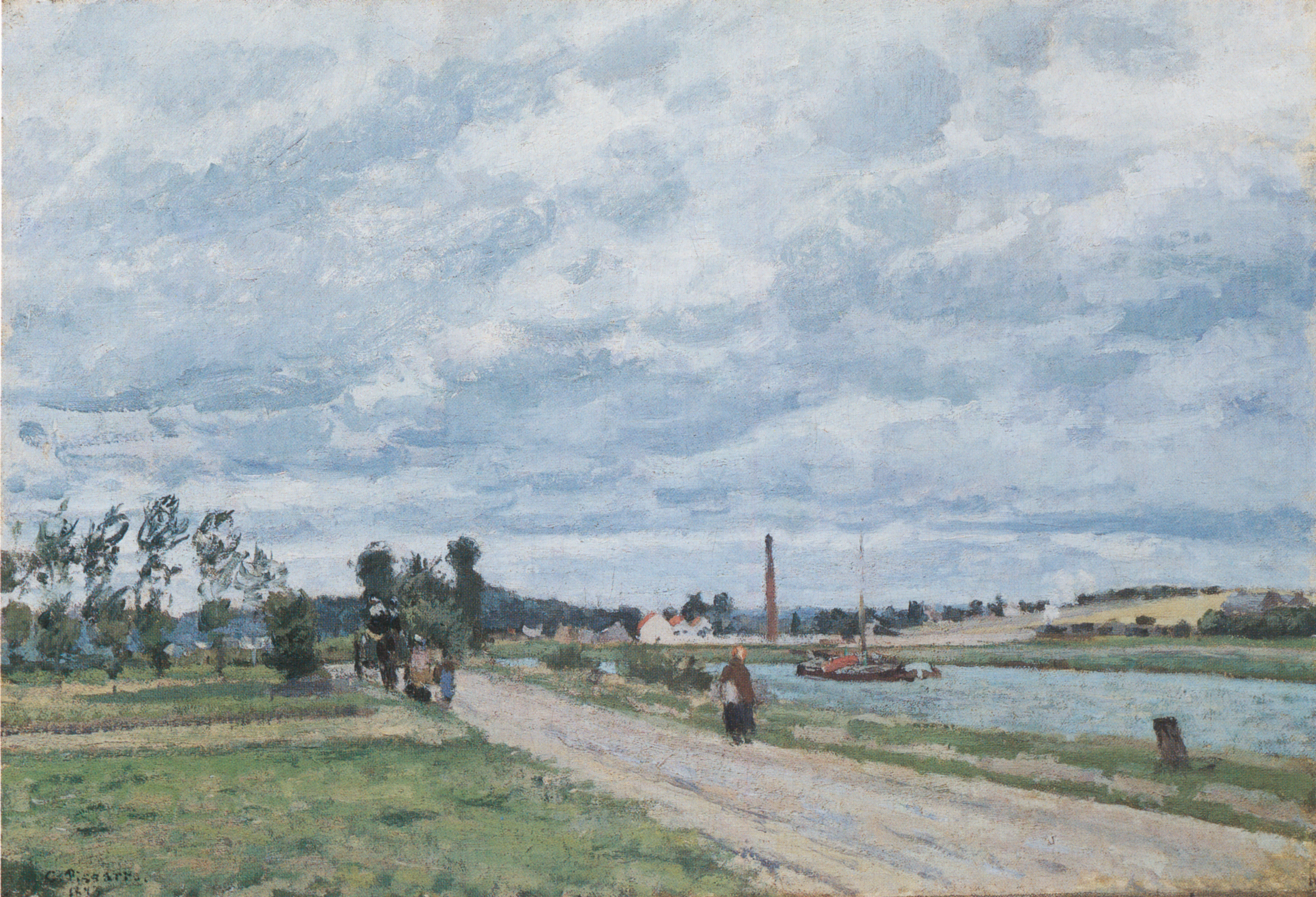
- Artist: Camille Pissarro
- Year: 1873
- Type: Oil painting on canvas
- Dimensions: 38 cm × 55.2 cm (15 in × 21.75 in)
- Location: Indianapolis Museum of Art, Indianapolis

The Banks of the Oise near Pontoise is an 1873 oil painting by French artist Camille Pissarro, located in the Indianapolis Museum of Art, which is in Indianapolis, Indiana. It depicts the river Oise near the market town of Pontoise.

== Description ==
Painted in the early days of Impressionism, this rural landscape uses gently luminous colors and loose brushwork to capture the atmospheric conditions of a silvery-grey, overcast day. While the surface texture is sensuous, the firm compositional network, Pissarro's hallmark, locks the road, river, field, and sky together tightly. Encroaching on the French landscape are clear signs of industrialization: factory, smokestack, railroad, and barge.

== Historical information ==
As a politically engaged artist, Pissarro had fled to London during the Franco-Prussian War. He settled in Pontoise in 1872, after it was safe to return. It was his period of purest Impressionism. He painted a series of paintings along the Oise in 1873. Factories along the bank played a prominent role, a blatant intrusion of modernity into a landscape contemporaries were still depicting as unspoiled nature. This particular image downplays the factory compared to others in the sequence, relegating it to the background, but it is still a significant part of this humdrum section of riverbank on a grey, cloudy day. The variety of treatments he afforded the factory seems to say less about his feelings about that structure in particular than about the purpose of modern painting, which had a duty to incorporate contrasting elements that had traditionally been kept separate.

== Acquisition ==
The Banks of the Oise near Pontoise was purchased with the James E. Roberts Fund by the Herron School of Art in 1940, then remained with the IMA during the split. It currently hangs in the Norb & Ruth Schaefer, Sr. and Norb & Carolyn Schaefer Jr. Gallery and has the accession number 40.252.

== See also ==
- List of paintings by Camille Pissarro
- The Côte des Bœufs at L’Hermitage
