= Place du Carrousel, Paris =

Painting by Camille Pissarro

- Artist: Camille Pissarro
- Year: 1900
- Medium: Oil on canvas, landscape painting
- Dimensions: 54.9 cm × 65.4 cm (21.6 in × 25.7 in)
- Location: National Gallery of Art, Washington D.C.

Place du Carrousel, Paris is a 1900 oil painting by the French impressionist artist Camille Pissarro. A cityscape, it features a view across the Place du Carrousel in the centre of Paris. Painted from the window of a hotel room in the Rue de Rivoli, overlooking the Tuileries Garden and the Louvre, it was part of a number of urban scenes he produced during the last decade of his career. During World War II the painting, which belonged to the German-Jewish art collector Bruno Stahl who had fled the Nazis, was seized and acquired for the collection of Hermann Göring who then traded it with Gustav Rochlitz. After the war the painting was restored to its original owner. Today it is part of the collection of the National Gallery of Art in Washington D.C., which acquired it in 1970.

== See also ==
- List of paintings by Camille Pissarro

== Bibliography ==
- Coman, Florence E. Joie de Vivre: French Paintings from the National Gallery of Art. Universe, 1991.
- Pissarro, Joachim. Camille Pissarro. H.N. Abrams, 1993.
- Stevens, Mary Anne (ed.) The Impressionist and the City: Pissarro's Series Paintings. Yale University Press, 1992.
