= The Garden of the Tuileries on a Winter Afternoon =

Painting by Camille Pissarro

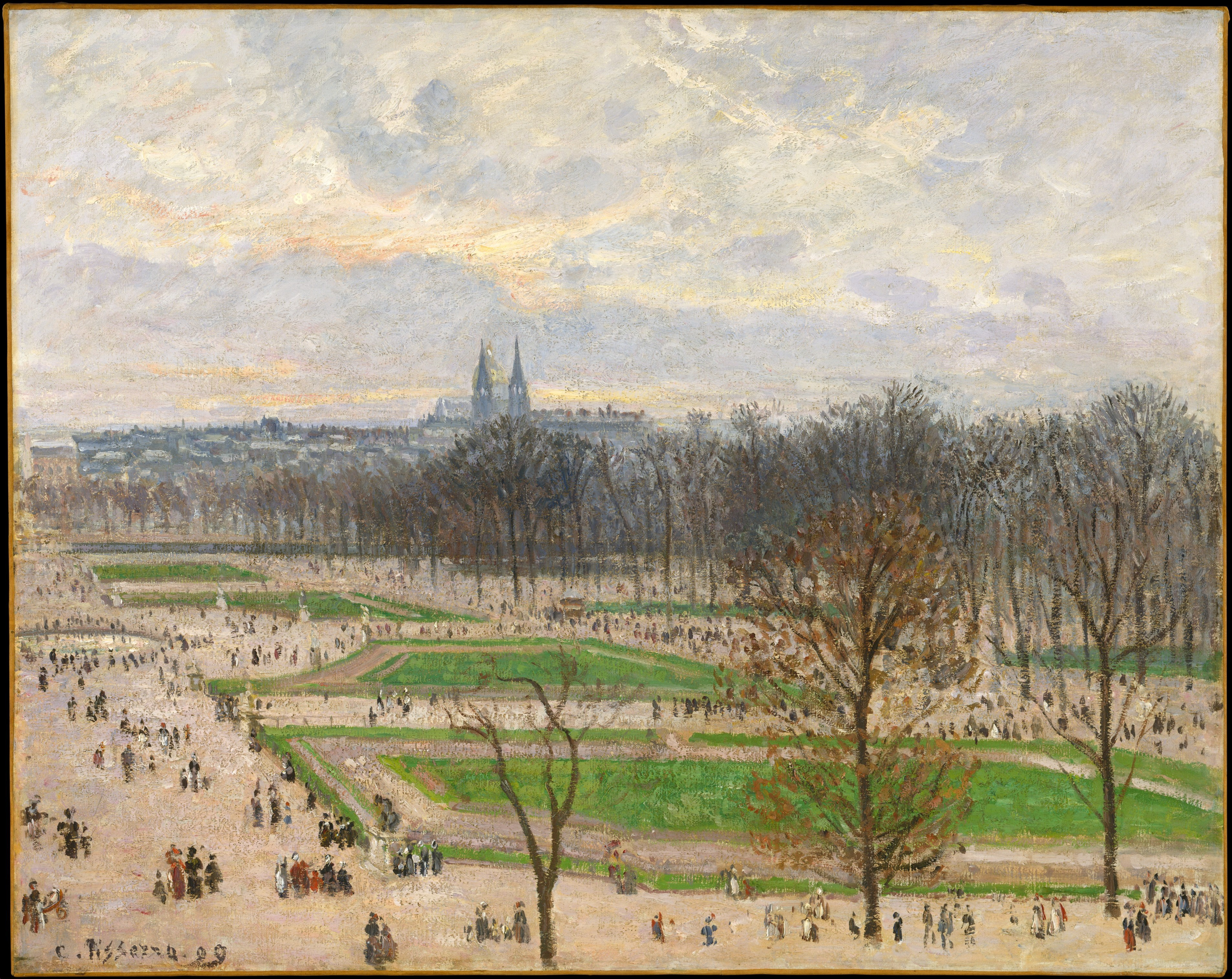
- Artist: Camille Pissarro
- Year: 1899
- Medium: Oil on canvas
- Dimensions: 73.7 cm × 92.1 cm (29.0 in × 36.3 in)
- Location: Metropolitan Museum of Art; New York
- Accession: 66.36

The Garden of the Tuileries on a Winter Afternoon is an oil on canvas painting by French artist Camille Pissarro, from 1899. It depicts the Tuileries Garden and surrounding landmarks in Paris. The painting is in the collection of the Metropolitan Museum of Art, in New York.

== Description ==
Pissarro's work depicts the Tuileries garden, a public space built on the site of the destroyed Tuileries Palace in Paris. The view depicted in Garden is likely from 204 Rue de Rivoli, where Pissarro had secured an apartment. Notable Parisian landmarks seen in the painting include the steeples of Sainte-Clotilde and the Dôme des Invalides. The painting is part of a series of eight cityscapes produced by Pissarro from 1898 to 1900.

Garden was initially given as a gift by Pissarro to the family of Impressionist painter Alfred Sisley (died 1899) to support them. The painting was then owned by a number of private collectors before being donated to the Met by Katrin S. Vietor (in memory of Ernest G. Vietor) in 1966.

== See also ==
- List of paintings by Camille Pissarro
