= List of paintings by Camille Pissarro =

Incomplete list of works by Camille Pissarro

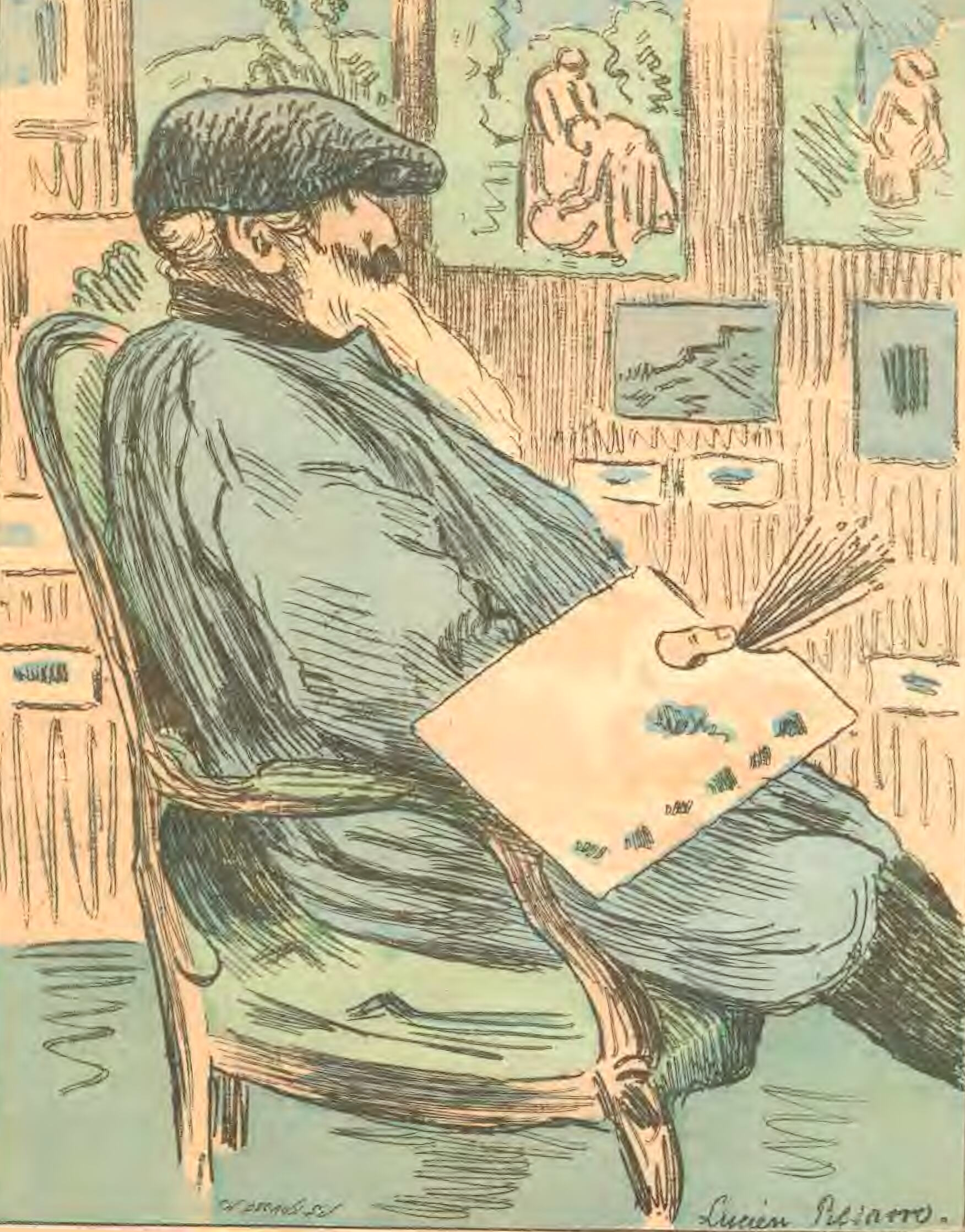
Portrait of Camille Pissarro by Lucien Pissarro, 1890

This is an incomplete list of the paintings by the Danish-French Impressionist artist Camille Pissarro (1830–1903).

The catalog numbers of the listed works are as given in the Catalogue Raisonné of the Wildenstein Institute.

== 1852–1856 (St Thomas, West Indies) ==
Image	French Title	English Title	Year	H × W (cm)	Collection	Cat No
	Scène villageoise	Landscape with House in the Woods in Saint Thomas, Antilles	c.1854–55	23.5 × 30.5	Private collection	8
	Village au pied d'une colline	Village at the Foot of a Hill in Saint Thomas, Antilles	c.1854–55	24 × 30.4	Private collection	9
	Village de Montagne	Mountain Landscape at Saint Thomas, Antilles (unfinished)	c.1854–55	26.2 × 23.5	Private collection	10
	Femme Noire portant une cruche sur la tête	Woman Carrying a Pitcher on Her Head	1854–55	33 × 24	Foundation E. G. Bührle, Zurich	15
	Crique avec palmiers	Creek with Palm Trees	1856	24.5 × 32.2	National Gallery of Art, Washington D.C.	16
	Personnages discutant au bord d'un chemin	Antilian Landscape, St. Thomas	1856	32.5 × 46	Private collection	19
	Deux femmes causant au bord de la mer	Two Women Chatting by the Sea	1856	27.9 × 41	National Gallery of Art, Washington D.C.	23
	Crique avec voilier	A Creek in Saint Thomas, Antilles	1856	35 × 53	Private collection	24
	Femme lavant du linge dans une rivière	Laundress on the Banks of the River	c.1856	16.9 × 24	Private collection	28

== 1857–1866 (Paris) ==
Image	French Title	English Title	Year	H × W (cm)	Collection	Cat No
	La Moisson	The Harvest	1857	14 × 26.7	Private collection	34
	Âne devant une ferme, Montmorency	Donkey in Front of a Farm, Montmorency	c.1859	21.5 × 27.2	Musée d'Orsay	37
	Allée dans une forêt	Forest Path	c.1859	41 × 33	Private collection	42
	La charette du bois	The Wood Cart	c.1862	16.5 × 25	Reuben and Edith Hecht Museum, Haifa	61
	La roulotte	The Caravan	c.1862	25 × 38	Private collection	62
	La Petite Fabrique	The Little Factory	c.1862–65	26,5 × 40,2	Strasbourg Museum of Modern and Contemporary Art	130
	La tour du Tèlegraphe à Montmartre	The Telegraph Tower at Montmartre	1863	40.7 × 32.4	Private collection	67
	Cour de ferme	Farmyard	c.1863	38.1 × 47.1	Private collection	69
	Coin de village, femmes causant	Village corner, Women Chatting	1863	40 × 52	Private collection	70
	Entrée d'une village	Entering a village	c.1863	33 × 41	Private collection	71
	La Varenne-Saint-Hilaire vue de Champigny		1863	49.6 × 74	Museum of Fine Arts (Budapest)	74
	Péniches sur la Seine	Barges on the Seine	c.1863	46 × 72	Musée Camille Pissarro, Pontoise, France	79
	Bord de rivière avec péniche	River bank and barge	c.1863	9.9 × 18.5	Private collection	80
	Sous bois	In the Woods	1864	26.5 × 21	Private collection	84
	Chemin à l'entrée d'un bois	Road entering a Forest	c.1864	28 × 35.3	Private collection	86
	Rencontre sur la route du village	Meeting on the Village Road	c.1864	21.8 × 35	Private collection	91
	Paysanne dans un champ, La Varenne-Saint-Hilaire	Peasant Woman in a Field, La Varenne-Saint-Hilaire	c.1865	18.5 × 35	Private collection	99
	La route	The Road	c.1865	40.7 × 31.8	Private collection	100
	Bords de la Marne à Chennevieres	The Marne at Chennevières	c.1865	91.5 × 145.5	Scottish National Gallery, Edinburgh	103
	Place à La Roche-Guyon	Square in La Roche Guyon	c.1865	50 × 61	Alte Nationalgalerie, Berlin	104
	Promenade à dos d'âne à La Roche-Guyon	Donkey Ride at La Roche Guyon	c.1865	35 × 51.7	Private collection	105
	Bords de la Marne en hiver	Banks of the Marne in Winter	1866	91.8 × 150	Art Institute of Chicago	107

== 1866–1868 (Pontoise) ==
Image	French Title	English Title	Year	H × W (cm)	Collection	Cat No
	La maison de père Gallien, Pontoise	Pere Gallien's House at Pontoise	1866	40.3 × 55.2	Ipswich Museum, UK	111
	Nature morte à la carafe du vin	Still Life with Wine Carafe	1867	81 × 99.6	Toledo Museum of Art, Ohio	114
	Le Jardin de Maubuisson	The Garden of Maubuisson	c.1867	81.5 × 100	National Gallery of Prague	115
	Côte des Jalais, Pontoise	Coast of Jalais, Pontoise	1867	87 × 114.9	Metropolitan Museum of Art, New York	116
	Bords de l'Oise à Saint-Ouen-l'Aumône	Banks of the Oise at Pontoise	1867	45.7 × 71.1	Denver Art Museum	117
	L'Hermitage a Pontoise	The Hermitage at Pontoise	1867	91 × 150.5	Wallraf-Richartz Museum, Cologne	119
	Vue de l'Hermitage, Côte de Gratte-Coqs, Pontoise	L'Hermitage at Pontoise	c.1867	150.3 × 200	Solomon R. Guggenheim Museum, New York City	120
	Quai de Pothuis, Pontoise	Quay of Pothuis, Pontoise	1868	52 × 81	Kunsthalle Mannheim	123
	Bords de l'Oise à Pontoise	The Banks of the Oise at Pontoise	1868	54 × 65	Private collection	124
	Pommiers à Pontoise, la maison du Père Gallien	Apple Trees at Pontoise, the House of Père Gallien	1868	38.3 × 46.4	Private collection	128
	Le Déversoir à Pontoise	The Weir at Pontoise	c.1868	58.5 × 72	Private collection	129

== 1869–1870 (Louveciennes) ==
Image	French Title	English Title	Year	H × W (cm)	Collection	Cat No
	Le village à travers les arbres	A Village through the Trees	c.1869	54 × 44.5	Private collection	134
	Croisement de la route de Versailles et du Chemin de l'Aqueduc, Louveciennes	The Versailles Road at Louveciennes	c.1869	38.4 × 46.3	Walters Art Museum, Baltimore	138
	La route de Versailles, Louveciennes, neige	The Route to Versailles, Louveciennes, snow	1870	43.2 × 65	Foundation E.G. Bührle, Zurich	142
	Parc du chateau du Pont sous la neige, Louveciennes	Grounds of the Chateau du Pont under snow, Louveciennes	c.1870	32.3 × 47.5	Art Institute of Chicago	143
	Entrée de la forêt de Marly, effet de neige	Entering the Forest of Marly (Snow Effect)	c.1870	38 × 46	Private collection	144
	Châtaigniers à Louveciennes	Chestnut Trees at Louveciennes, Spring	1870	59.5 × 73	Museum Langmatt, Baden	148
	Route de Versailles, Louveciennes	Road to Versailles, Louveciennes	1870	33 × 41.3	Clark Art Institute, Williamstown, Massachusetts	151
	La Diligence sur la route de Versailles, Louveciennes	Stagecoach to Louveciennes	1870	25.5 × 35.7	Musée d'Orsay, Paris	152
	Route de Versailles, Louveciennes, après la Pluie	The Road to Versailles, Louveciennes, after Rain	1870	50 × 61	Private collection	153
	Route de Versailles, effet de la Pluie	The Road to Versailles, effect of Rain	1870	40 × 56.2	Clark Art Institute, Williamstown, Massachusetts	155
	Maisons à Bougival	Houses at Bougival	1870	89 × 116	J Paul Getty Museum, Los Angeles	157
	Vue de l'aqueduc de Louveciennes, printemps	View of the Aqueduct at Louveciennes, Spring	c. 1870	52.7 × 81.9	National Gallery, London	158
	(Chemin de Prunay, arbre en fleur, Louveciennes)	Chemin de Prunay, Blossoming Tree, Louveciennes	1870	46.7 × 56.5	Private collection	159
	La maison de M. Musy, Louveciennes	The House of Monsieur Musy, Louveciennes	1870	43.5 × 65	Private collection	161
	La Conversation, Louveciennes	The Conversation, Louveciennes	1870	100.5 × 81	Foundation E.G. Bührle, Zurich	163
	Promeneurs sur la route de Versailles, Louveciennes)	Strollers on the Road to Versailles, Louveciennes	1870	45.8 × 55.7	Southampton Art Gallery	164
	Route à Louveciennes	A Road in Louveciennes	1870	44 × 30	Private collection	167
	Vue sur le village de Marly-le-Roi	View of Marly-le-Roi	1870	47 × 71	Foundation E.G. Bührle, Zurich	170
	La forêt	The Forest	1870	78.8 × 97.6	Johannesburg Art Gallery	172
	Les sapins à Louveciennes	The Pine Trees at Louveciennes	1870	69 × 78	Private collection	173

== 1870–1871 (London) ==
Image	English Title	Year	H × W (cm)	Collection	Cat No
	Fox Hill, Upper Norwood, effect of Snow	1870	35.3 × 47.5	National Gallery, London	180
	St Stephen's Church, Dulwich	1870	42.6 × 52.8	Private collection	181
	Crystal Palace viewed from Fox Hill, Upper Norwood	1871	47 × 73.2	Art Institute of Chicago	183
	Crystal Palace, Upper Norwood	c.1871	40 × 50.8	Private collection	184
	All Saints' Church, Beulah Hill, Snow	1871	46 × 55	Private collection	186
	Snowy Landscape at South Norwood	1871	44.5 × 55.5	Los Angeles County Museum of Art	187
	The Avenue, Sydenham	1871	48 × 73	National Gallery, London	188
	Lordship Lane Station, Dulwich	1871	44.5 × 72.5	Courtauld Institute Galleries, London	189
	View of Alleyn Park, West Dulwich	1871	43.5 × 53.5	Kimbell Art Museum, Fort Worth, Texas	190
	Dulwich College	1871	50 × 61	Bemberg Foundation, Toulouse	191

== 1871–1872 (Louveciennes) ==
Image	French Title	English Title	Year	H × W (cm)	Collection	Cat No
	Route de Versailles, Rocquencourt	Road to Versailles, Rocquencourt	1871	51.5 × 76.2	Van Gogh Museum, Amsterdam	195
	Route de Versailles, Louveciennes, lumière du soleil	Road to Versailles, Louveciennes, Sunlight	1871	45 × 55	Sammlung Galerie Rosengart, Lucerne	196
	Route de Versailles, Louveciennes	Road to Versailles, Louveciennes	1871	38 × 46	Private collection	198
	La Seine à Bougival	The Seine at Bougival	1871	44 × 60	Private collection	200
	Les berges de la Seine à Bougival	Banks of the Seine at Bougival	1871	27.5 × 40.5	Stolen in 1993, recovered damaged in 2009	201
	Barrage sur la Seine à Bougival	Weir on the Seine at Bougival	1871	33 × 46	Nelson-Atkins Museum of Art, Kansas City, Missouri	203
	Louveciennes	Louveciennes	1871	90 × 116.5	Private collection	207
	Châtaigniers à Louveciennes	Chestnut Trees at Louveciennes	1872	41 × 54	Musée d'Orsay, Paris	218
	Bois de châtaigniers en hiver, Louveciennes	Chestnut Coppice in Winter, Louveciennes	1872	27 × 40.4	Bemberg Foundation, Toulouse	220
	Le relais de post à Louvecienne, effet de neige	The Post-house at Louveciennes, Effect of Snow	1872	45.7 × 55	Private collection	221
	Route de Versailles, Louveciennes	Road to Versailles, Louveciennes	1872	60 × 73.5	Musée d'Orsay, Paris	224
	Charette sur une route, hiver, environs de Louveciennes	Cart on a road near Louveciennes, Winter	1872	32.4 × 46.3	Private collection	226
	Bois de châtaigniers à Louveciennes	Chestnut Grove at Louveciennes	1872	40.6 × 54.4	Nelson-Atkins Museum of Art, Kansas City, Missouri	233
	Entrée du village de Voisins	Entrance to village of Voisins	1872	46 × 55.5	Musée d'Orsay, Paris	235
	Paysage avec une vachère	Landscape with woman herding a cow	c.1872	33 × 46.4	Private collection	242
	Le déversoir et l'écluse à Saint-Ouen-l'Aumônt	The Weir and Lock at Saint-Ouen-l'Aumônt	1872	38.1 × 54.6	Private collection	244
	Le repos sous les arbres	Resting under the Trees	1872	73.7 × 92.7	Private collection	253

== 1872–1882 (Pontoise) ==
Image	French Title	English Title	Year	H × W (cm)	Collection	Cat No
	Cheval blanc dans une pré, l'Hermitage, Pontoise	White Horse in a Field, l'Hermitage, Pontoise	1872	46 × 55	Private collection	261
	Pommes et poires dans un panier rond	Apples and Pears in a Round Basket	1872	46.2 × 55.8	Private collection	269
	Pommes châtagniers et faïence sur une table	Chatagnier Apples and Glazed Earthenware on a Table	c.1872	46.4 × 56.5	Metropolitan Museum of Art, New York City	270
	Ruisseau dans la campagne	A Country Stream	1872	47.5 × 56.5	Private collection	271
	Boulevard des Fossés, Pontoise	Boulevard des Fossés, Pontoise	1872	46.4 × 55.9	Norton Simon Museum, Pasadena	277
	Quai de Pothuis, Pontoise	Quay of Pothuis, Pontoise	1872	45.1 × 55.2	Virginia Museum of Fine Arts, Richmond	280
	Jeanne Pissarro, dite Minette, avec un bouquet	Jeanne Pissarro, called Minette, with a Bouquet	1872	72.5 × 59.7	Yale University Art Gallery, New Haven, Connecticut	281
	Portrait de Jeanne Pissarro, dite Minette	Portrait of Jeanne Pissarro, called Minette	c.1872	46 × 35	Wadsworth Atheneum, Hartford, Connecticut	282
	Route d'Osny à Pontoise, gelée blanche	The Road to Osny at Pontoise, Hoar Frost	1873	50.5 × 65	Foundation E.G. Bührle, Zurich	287
	Le champ de choux, Pontoise	Cabbage Field, Pontoise	1873	60 × 80	Thyssen-Bornemisza Museum, Madrid	294
	Inondation à Saint-Ouen-l'Aumône	Flood at Saint-Ouen-l'Aumône	1873	64.9 × 81.2	Wadsworth Atheneum, Hartford, Connecticut	295
	Usine de Saint-Ouen-l'Aumône	Factory at Saint-Ouen-l'Aumône	1873	45.7 × 54.6	Michele & Donald D'Amour Museum of Fine Arts, Springfield	298
	Usine au bord de l'Oise, Saint-Ouen-l'Aumône	Factory on the Banks of the Oise, Saint-Ouen-l'Aumône	1873	38 × 55	Israel Museum, Jerusalem	299
	Usine au bord de l'Oise, Saint-Ouen-l'Aumône	Factory on the Banks of the Oise, Saint-Ouen-l'Aumône	1873	45.3 × 55	Clark Art Institute, Williamstown, Massachusetts	300
	La Route d'Auvers au bord de l'Oise, Pontoise	Route d'Auvers on the Banks of the Oise, Pontoise	1873	38.1 × 57.8	Indianapolis Museum of Art	303
	La Maison rouge	The Red House	1873	59.4 × 73.3	Portland Art Museum, Oregon	307
	Le jardin de la ville, Pontoise	The Municipal Garden, Pontoise	1873	59.5 × 73.3	Hermitage Museum, Leningrad	309
	Plaine avec meules, environs de Pontoise	Open Fields with Haystacks near Pontoise	1873	38 × 55	National Gallery of Art, Washington D.C.	319
	Jeanne Pissarro dite Minette, tenant un éventail	Jeanne Pissarro. called Minette, holding a fan	c.1874	55 × 46	Ashmolean Museum, Oxford, UK	325
	Portrait de Paul Cézanne	Portrait of Paul Cézanne	c.1874	73 × 59.7	National Gallery, London	326
	Terres labourées	Ploughed Fields	1874	49 × 64	Pushkin Museum, Moscow []	341
	Gardeuse de vache, Auvers-sur-Oise	Woman Herding a Cow, Auvers-sur-Oise	1874	54.9 × 92.1	Metropolitan Museum of Art, New York City	354
	La cuisine chez Piette, Montfoucault	The Kitchen in Piette's House, Montfoucault	1874	45.1 × 54.6	Detroit Institute of Arts	380
	Maison de Piette à Montfoucault, effet de neige	Piette's house at Montfoucault, Effect of Snow	1874	60 × 73.5	Fitzwilliam Museum, Cambridge	386
	Paysanne démèlant de la laine	Peasant Woman Carding Wool	1875	56 × 47	Foundation E.G. Bührle, Zurich	420
	(Péniches à Pontoise)	Barges at Pontoise	1876	46 × 54.9	Metropolitan Museum of Art, New York	460
	Bouquet de Lilas	Bouquet of Lilacs	1876		Deji Art Museum, Nanjing	482
	Coin de jardin à l'Hermitage. Pontoise	A Corner of The Garden at Les Mathurins, Pontoise	1877	55x46	Musée d'Orsay	504
	Côte des Bœufs, Pontoise	Côte des Bœufs, Pontoise	1877	114.9 × 87.6	National Gallery	488
	La Garenne, Côte Saint-Denis à Pontoise, effet de neige	The Rabbit Warren, Côte Saint-Denis at Pontoise, Effect of Snow	1879	59.2 × 72.3	Art Institute of Chicago	587
	Le Père Melon sciant du bois	Père Melon Sawing Wood	c.1879	54 × 65	Private collection	610
	Mère Larchéveque	Mère Larchéveque	1880	73 × 59.1	Metropolitan Museum of Art, New York City	640
	Paysanne béchant le Jardin de Maubuisson, Pontoise	Peasant Woman Digging, the Jardin de Maubuisson, Pontoise	1881	46 × 55	Private collection	646
	La récolte	The Harvest, Pontoise	1881	46.1 × 55.2	Metropolitan Museum of Art, New York City	648
	Deux jeunes paysannes causant sous les arbres, Pontoise	Two Young Peasant Girls Chatting Under a Tree	1881	81 × 65	Private collection	654
	La gardeuse de chèvre	The Goat Girl	1881	81.3 × 65.4	Private collection	656
	La conversation	The Conversation	c.1881	65.3 × 54	National Museum of Western Art, Tokyo	658
	Jeune paysanne au chapeau de paille	Peasant Girl with a Straw Hat	1881	73.4 × 59.6	National Gallery of Art, Washington D.C.	661
	Le petit déjeuner, jeune paysanne prenant son café au lait	The Breakfast, Youg Peasant Girl Drinking her Café au Lait	1881	63.9 × 54.4	Art Institute of Chicago	662
	Félix Pissarro au béret rouge	Felix Pissarro Wearing a Red Beret	1881	55.2 × 46.4	Tate Gallery, London	663
	Félix Pissarro, en jupe	Felix Pissarro Wearing a Skirt	c.1882	46.5 × 38.5	Bemberg Foundation, Toulouse	676
	Paysanne béchant	Peasant Woman Digging	1882	65 × 54	Private collection	678
	La petite bonne de campagne	The Young Country Servant	1882	63.5 × 53	Tate Britain, London	681
	La Vaisselle	Washing up	1882	81.9 × 64.8	Fitzwilliam Museum, Cambridge, UK	685

== 1882–1884 (Osny) ==
Image	French Title	English Title	Year	H × W (cm)	Collection	Cat No
	La route de Pontoise, Osny	The Road to Pontoise, Osny	1883	41 × 32	Private collection	698
		The Farm of Le Friche at Osny	1883	46 × 54	Private collection	701
		View of the Village of Osny	1883	60 × 73	Private collection	703
	La charcutiėre	The Pork Butcher	1883	65.1 × 64.3	Tate Gallery, London	706
		Place Lafayette, Rouen	1883	46.3 × 55.7	Courtauld Gallery, London	724
	Quai de Paris et Pont Corneille, Rouen, soleil	Quay Napoleon, Rouen	1883	54.3 × 64.4	Philadelphia Museum of Art	727
	Le pont de pierre et les péniches à Rouen	The Stone Bridge and Barges at Rouen	1883	54.3 × 65.2	Columbus Museum of Art, Ohio	728
	Paysanne se chauffant	Peasant Girl Warming Herself	1883	73 × 60	Private collection	739

== 1884–1901 (Eragny-sur-Epte) ==
Image	French Title	English Title	Year	H × W (cm)	Collection	Cat No
		Entrance to the Village of Eragny	1884	50.2 × 61.3	Pola Museum of Art	752
		The Church and the Manor House at Éragny	1884	54.5 × 63	The Museum of Modern Art, Gunma, Japan	754
	Vue de Bazincourt	Vue de Bazincourt	1884	54 × 65	Private collection	756
		The Church at Éragny	1884	54 × 64.8	Walters Art Museum, Baltimore	758
	La faneuse	The Haymaker	1884	73.5 × 60	Private collection	766
	Eugénie Estruc, dite Nini, en buste	Portrait of Eugénie Estruc, called Nini	1884	65 × 54	Ny Carlsberg Glyptotek, Copenhagen	767
	Vieilles maisons à Éragny	Old Houses at Éragny	1884	46 × 55.5	Private collection	773
	Maison de payson à Éragny	Peasant's House at Éragny	1884	46 × 55	Los Angeles County Museum of Art	774
	Vachère à Éragny	Girl Tending Cows at Eragny	1884	59.7 × 73.3	Museum of Modern Art, Saitama, Japan	775
		View of Bazincourt, effect of snow	1884	46.7 × 55.5	Fine Arts Museums of San Francisco	782
	Le clocher à Bazincourt	The Bell Tower at Bazincourt	1885	64.2 × 54.7	Saint Louis Art Museum	787
		View of the Village of Éragny	1885	59.7 × 73	Birmingham Museum of Art, Alabama	790
	Paysanne assise	Seated Peasant Girl	1885	73 × 59.7	Yale University Art Gallery	798
	Vue de la fenêtre de l'artiste, Eragny	The Delafolie House, Éragny, Sunset	1885	73 × 60.5	Museum of Grenoble, France	800
		The Delafolie House, Éragny	1885	54.5 × 65	Private collection	804
	Le marché de Gisors, Grande-Rue	Market on the Grande Rue, Gisors	1885	46 × 38	Private collection	816
	Bergère rentrant des moutons	Shepherdess Bringing in the Sheep	1886	46 × 38	Fred Jones Jr. Museum of Art, Norman, Oklahoma	819
	La Maison de la Sourde et le clocher d'Éragny	The House of the Deaf Woman and the Belfry at Eragny	1886	65 × 81	Indianapolis Museum of Art	827
	Maisons de paysans, Éragny	Peasant's Houses, Eragny	1887	59 × 71.7	Art Gallery of New South Wales	844
	La récolte des foins, Éragny	Haymaking, Éragny	1887	50 × 66	Van Gogh Museum, Amsterdam	848
	La cueillette des pommes, Éragny	Apple Harvest, Éragny	1887–88	60 × 73	Dallas Museum of Art	850
	Femme étendant du linge, Éragny	Woman hanging out the Washing, Éragny	1887	41 × 32.5	Musée d'Orsay	854
	La Seine à Rouen, L'Île Lacroix, effet de brouillard	The Seine at Rouen, the Île Lacroix, Effect of Fog	1888	46.7 × 55.9	Philadelphia Museum of Art	855
	Jeune Paysanne faisant du feu. Gelée blanche	Peasant Girl Making a Fire, Hoar Frost	1888	92.8 × 92.5	Musée d'Orsay	857
	Berger avec moutons	Shepherd with Sheep	1888	22.2 × 27	Private collection	
	Faneuse á Éragny	Peasant Girl Raking Hay at Éragny	1889	73.7 × 60.3	Private collection	866
	Troupeau de moutons dans un champ après la moisson, Éragny	A Flock of Sheep in a Field after the Harvest, Éragny	1889	62 × 76	Private collection	867
	Les glaneuses	The Gleaners	1889	65.5 × 81	Kunstmuseum Basel	869
	Le sentier, femmes causant	The Path, Women Chatting	1889	72.4 × 59.7	Detroit Institute of Arts	871
	Paysage avec troupeau des moutons	Landscape with a Flock of Sheep	1889–1902	60.3 × 73.7	Norton Simon Museum, Pasadena	873
	Femme et chèvre à Éragny	Woman and Goat at Éragny or Spring Pasture	1889	60 × 73.7	Museum of Fine Arts, Boston	874
		Paul-Émile Pissarro	1890	41 × 33	Private collection	878
		Battersea Bridge, Chelsea, London	1890	59.7 × 72.4	Smith College Museum of Art, Northampton, Massachusetts	883
		Charing Cross Bridge, London	1890	60 × 90	National Gallery of Art, Washington D.C.	884
	La causette	The Chat or Two Young Peasant Women	1891–92	89.5 × 116.5	Metropolitan Museum of Art, New York City	912
	L'église Marguerite à Knocke	The Marguerite Church at Knocke	1894	54.5 × 65.5	Musée d'Orsay, Paris	1035
		The Village of Knocke	1894	54 × 65		1036
		View of Zevekote, Knocke	1894	48.2 × 65.2		1047
	Le bain de pieds	The Foot-bath	1895	73 × 92	Art Institute of Chicago	1061
	Baigneuse	Bather	1895	60.3 × 73	Metropolitan Museum of Art, New York	1062
	Jeune paysanne nue debout	Peasant Woman Standing Naked	1895	35.3 × 27.3	National Gallery of Art, Washington D.C.	1063
	Femmes dans un clos, printemps, temps gris, Ēragny	Women in a Fenced-in Field, Spring, Overcast, Ēragny	1895	60.2 × 72.3	Art Gallery of Ontario, Toronto	1075
	Le marché à Gisors	The Market at Gisors	1895	46.3 × 38.3	Nelson-Atkins Museum of Art, Kansas City	1097
	Trois baigneuses sortant du bain (étude)	Three Bathers (study)	c.1896	65 × 54	Hiroshima Museum of Art	1107
	Le Pont Boieldieu à Rouen, temps mouillé	Pont Boieldieu in Rouen, Rainy Weather	1896	73.6 × 91.4	Art Gallery of Ontario, Toronto	1116
		Pont Boieldieu, Rouen, Sunset	1896	74.2 × 92.5	Birmingham Museum and Art Gallery, UK	1117
	Le Pont Boieldieu à Rouen, soleil couchant, fumées	Pont Boieldieu in Rouen, Sunset, Smoke	1896	54 × 65	Musée d'Orsay, Paris	1118
	La Seine à Rouen, Saint-Sever	The Seine at Rouen, Saint-Sever	1896	65.5 × 92	Musée d'Orsay, Paris	1122
	La Seine à Rouen, Saint-Sever, fumées	The Seine at Rouen, Saint-Sever, Smoke	1896	45.7 × 54.6	Metropolitan Museum of Art, New York City	1123
	Autoportrait à la palette	Self-portrait with Palette	c.1896	52 × 30.5	Dallas Museum of Art	1129
	Autoportrait avec béret et lunettes	Self-portrait with Beret and Speectacles	c.1896	35.5 × 32	Private collection	1130
	Le Pont Boieldieu à Rouen, matin, temps mouillé	Pont Boieldieu, Rouen, Morning, Rainy Weather	1896	54.3 × 65.1	Metropolitan Museum of Art, New York City	1140
	Boulevard Montmartre, Mardi Gras	Boulevard Montmartre, Mardi Gras	1897	63.5 × 77.5	Hammer Museum, Los Angeles	1163
	Le Boulevard Montmartre, matinée de printemps	Boulevard Montmartre, Spring Morning	1897	65 × 81	Private collection	1171
	Rue St. Honoré, Apres Midi, Effet de Pluie	Rue Saint-Honoré in the Afternoon. Effect of Rain	1897	81 × 65	Museo Thyssen-Bornemisza	1196
	Matin, printemps, soleil, Éragny	Morning, Spring, Sunlight, Eragny	1900	65.4 × 81	Tokyo Fuji Art Museum	1322
	Le lavoir à Bazincourt	The Wash-house at Bazincourt	1900	65.5 × 81	Musée d'Orsay, Paris	1323
		Still Life, the Coffee Pot	1900	54.5 × 65.3	Hermitage Museum, St Petersburg	1326
	Le jardin des Tuileries, été	The Tuileries Gardens, Summer	1900	54.5 × 65.5	Kreeger Museum, Washington D.C.	1329
	Place du Carrousel, Paris	Place du Carrousel, Paris	1900	54.9 × 65.4	National Gallery of Art	
	L'église Saint-Jacques à Dieppe, soleil, matin	The Church of St Jacques in Dieppe, Sunlight, Morning	1901	54.5 × 65.5	Musée d'Orsay	1384
	Fenaison à Ėragny	Haymaking at Éragny	1901	53.9 × 64.7	National Gallery of Canada, Ottawa	1393
	Le Louvre, soleil couchant, gelée glanche	The Louvre, Sunset, Hoar-Frost	1901	73 × 92	Museo Botero, Bogotá	1402

== 1890–1897 (London) ==
Image	French Title	English Title	Year	H × W (cm)	Collection	Cat No
		Charing Cross Bridge, London	1890	60 × 90	National Gallery of Art	
	Kew Greens	Kew Green	1892	46 × 55	Museum of Fine Arts of Lyon	
		Bank Holiday, Kew	1892	46 × 55	Private collection	
		Bath Road, London	1897	54 × 65	Ashmolean Museum, Oxford	

== See also ==
- La Petite Fabrique 1862–1865
- The Banks of the Oise near Pontoise 1873
- A Cowherd at Valhermeil, Auvers-sur-Oise 1874
- Côte des Bœufs at L'Hermitage, 1877
- The Harvest, Pontoise 1881
- The House of the Deaf Woman and the Belfry at Eragny 1886
- Shepherdess Bringing in Sheep 1886
- Morning, An Overcast Day, Rouen 1896
- Pont Boieldieu in Rouen, Rainy Weather, 1896
- Steamboats in the Port of Rouen, 1896
- Le Boulevard de Montmartre, matinée de printemps, 1897
- Boulevard Montmartre, Mardi Gras 1897
- Rue Saint-Honoré, dans l'après-midi. Effet de pluie 1897
- The Garden of the Tuileries on a Winter Afternoon 1899
- Hay Harvest at Éragny, 1901
