= Bank Holiday, Kew =

Painting by Camille Pissarro

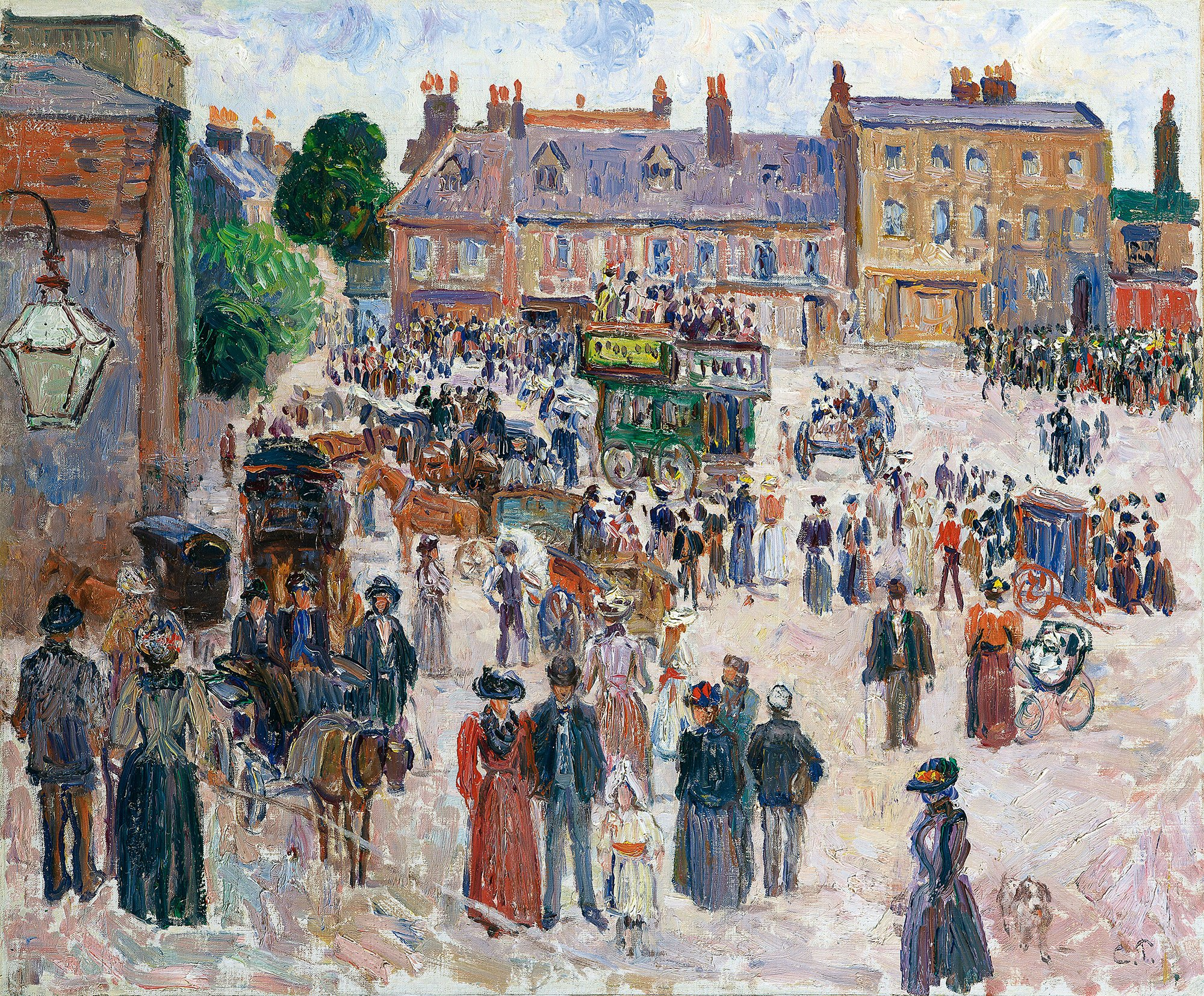
- Artist: Camille Pissarro
- Year: 1892
- Medium: Oil on canvas, landscape painting
- Dimensions: 46 cm × 55 cm (18 in × 22 in)
- Location: Private collection

Bank Holiday, Kew is an 1892 oil painting by the French artist Camille Pissarro. It depicts a Bank holiday in Kew, then on the western outskirts of London It faces away from Kew Green itself, focusing on the daytrippers who have travelled there by bus or train and the local shops and pubs. Bank holidays had been introduced in 1871 by an Act of Parliament. It was produced on the whitsun in early June that year.

Pissarro was a leading Impressionist who had fled to London during the Franco-Prussian War. Two decades later Pissarro returned to stay in London, where his son Lucien lived, on three occasions. On the second of these visits he rented a property overlooking Kew Green and produced several paintings from this vantage point. This painting was a key step on his switch from painting more rural and suburban scenes to the urban cityscapes of his final decade. It is used as an particularly clear example of the influence Pissarro's work had on the paintings of Lowry.

== See also ==
- Kew Green, a painting produced by Pissarro the same year
- List of paintings by Camille Pissarro

== Bibliography ==
- Corbeau-Parsons, Caroline (ed.)Impressionists in London: French Artists in Exile 1870–1904. Tate Publishing, 2017.
- Pissarro, Joachim. Camille Pissarro. H.N. Abrams, 1993.
- Reed, Nicholas. Pissarro in West London. Lilburne Press, 1997.
- Stevens, Mary Anne (ed.) The Impressionist and the City: Pissarro's Series Paintings. Yale University Press, 1992.
