= Bank holiday =

Type of public holiday

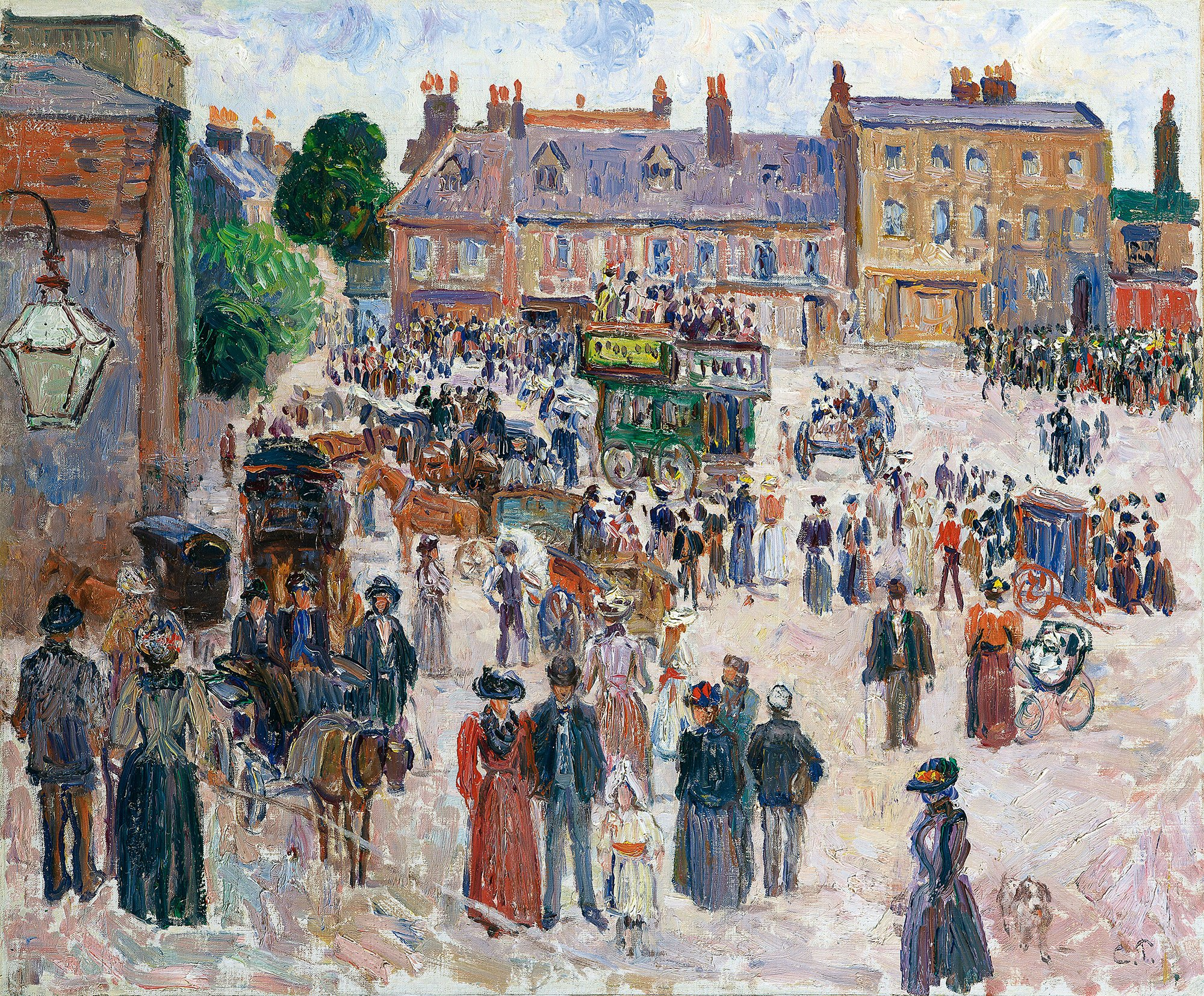
Bank Holiday, Kew by Camille Pissarro, 1892

A bank holiday is a national public holiday in the United Kingdom and the Crown Dependencies, and a colloquial term for a public holiday in Ireland. In the United Kingdom, the term is used to refer to all public holidays, be they set out in statute, declared by royal proclamation, or held by convention under common law. In Ireland, there are some bank holidays which are not public holidays.

The term "bank holiday" refers to the fact that banking institutions typically close for business on such holidays, as they once did on certain saint's days.

Bank holidays were introduced by John Lubbock, 1st Baron Avebury in the Bank Holidays Act 1871, which was superseded by the Banking and Financial Dealings Act 1971.

== List of current holidays ==
The UK government publishes always up-to-date lists of upcoming and past bank holiday dates for England and Wales, Scotland, and Northern Ireland.

Current bank and public holidays
| Date | Name | England and Wales (8) | Scotland (10) | Northern Ireland (10) | Republic of Ireland (10) | Isle of Man (10) | Jersey and Guernsey (9) |
|---|---|---|---|---|---|---|---|
| 1 January | New Year's Day | ✓ | ✓ | ✓ | ✓ | ✓ | ✓ |
| 2 January (Note: When a stated fixed date falls on a Saturday or Sunday, the following Monday is normally designated a bank holiday instead. When Christmas Day and New Year's Day fall on a Saturday (and thus 26 December and 2 January on a Sunday), the following Tuesday 28 December (and Tuesday 4 January in Scotland) are also bank holidays.) | 2 January | | ✓ | | | | |
| First Monday in February, or 1 February if the date falls on a Friday | Imbolc / Saint Brigid's Day | | | | ✓ | | |
| 17 March | Saint Patrick's Day | | | ✓ | ✓ | | |
| The Friday before Easter Sunday | Good Friday | ✓ | ✓ | ✓ | | ✓ | ✓ |
| The Monday after Easter Sunday | Easter Monday | ✓ | | ✓ | ✓ | ✓ | ✓ |
| First Monday in May (Note: In 1995 this holiday was moved to Monday 8 May and in 2020 to Friday 8 May – to commemorate the 50th and 75th anniversary of VE Day.) (Note: In 2011 an additional public holiday was declared to ensure that most people would have a chance to celebrate the Wedding of Prince William and Catherine Middleton, making a four-day weekend as May Day was on the following Monday.) | Early May bank holiday | ✓ | ✓ | ✓ | ✓ | ✓ | ✓ |
| 9 May | Liberation Day | | | | | | ✓ |
| Last Monday in May (Note: In 2002, 2012, and 2022 this holiday was moved to early June to mark Queen Elizabeth II's Golden, Diamond, and Platinum Jubilees. All three were paired with a second extra holiday to create a four-day weekend.) | Spring Bank Holiday / Late May Bank Holiday | ✓ | ✓ | ✓ | | ✓ | ✓ |
| First Monday in June | June Bank Holiday | | | | ✓ | | |
| First Friday in June | Senior Race Day | | | | | ✓ | |
| 5 July | Tynwald Day | | | | | ✓ | |
| 12 July | The Twelfth (Battle of the Boyne) | | | ✓ | | | |
| First Monday in August | Summer Bank Holiday (August Bank Holiday) | | ✓ | | ✓ | | |
| Last Monday in August | August Bank Holiday | ✓ | | ✓ | | ✓ | ✓ |
| Last Monday in October | October Bank Holiday | | | | ✓ | | |
| 30 November | St Andrew's Day | | ✓ | | | | |
| 25 December (Note: When Christmas Day falls on a Saturday (and thus 26 December on a Sunday), and when Christmas Day falls on a Sunday (and thus 26 December on a Monday), the Monday following Christmas Day is designated a bank holiday by the 1971 Act.) | Christmas Day | ✓ | ✓ | ✓ | ✓ | ✓ | ✓ |
| 26 December (Note: When Christmas Day falls on a Saturday (and thus 26 December on a Sunday), the following Tuesday 28 December is also normally designated a bank holiday by proclamation. (See e.g. "No. 63425". The London Gazette. 23 July 2021. p. 13140.) When Christmas Day falls on a Sunday (and thus 26 December on a Monday), the following Tuesday 27 December is designated a bank holiday by the 1971 Act.) | Boxing Day / Saint Stephen's Day | ✓ | ✓ | ✓ | ✓ | ✓ | ✓ |

== See also ==
- List of holidays by country
  - Federal holiday, US equivalent
- Bank Holidays Act 1871
- Proposed St David's Day bank holiday
