= Ploughed Fields =

Painting by Camille Pissarro

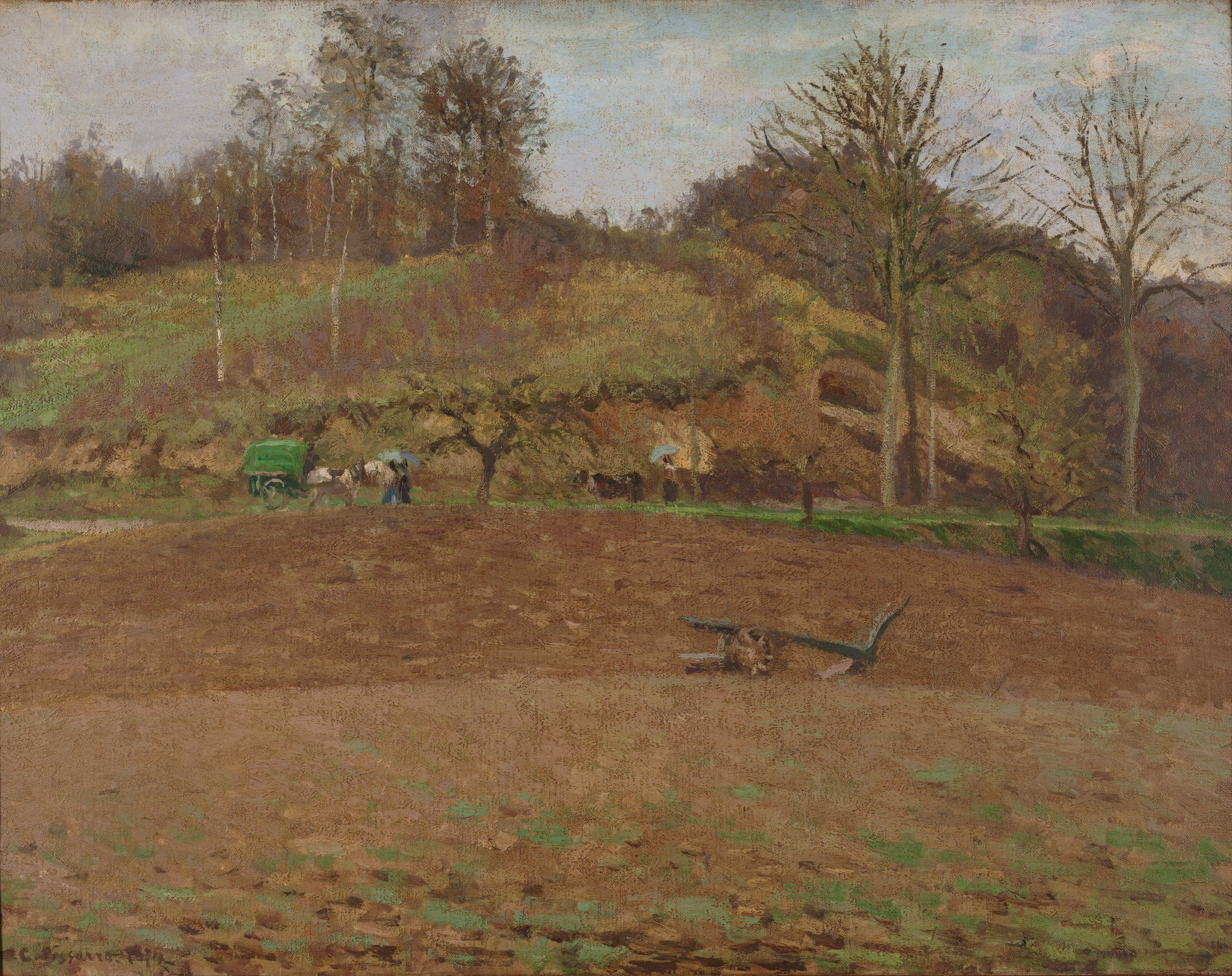
- Artist: Camille Pissarro
- Year: 1874
- Medium: oil on canvas
- Dimensions: 49 cm × 64 cm (19 in × 25 in)
- Location: Pushkin Museum of Fine Arts, Moscow

Ploughed Fields (French: Terres labourées) is an 1874 painting by Camille Pissarro, now in the Pushkin Museum, in Moscow.

Produced near Pontoise, it was first owned by Pierre-Firmin Martin, who bought it directly from the artist on 12 August 1874. It was then exhibited in Ambroise Vollard's gallery under the title Arable Land and it was bought from there in 1904 by the Moscow industrialist and collector I. A. Morozov.

After the October Revolution Morozov's collection was seized by the state and entered the State Museum of Modern Western Art on the latter's foundation in 1923. When that museum was closed in 1948 the painting was transferred to the Pushkin Museum, where it still hangs.

== See also ==
- List of paintings by Camille Pissarro
