= The Little Factory =

Painting by Camille Pissarro

- La Petite Fabrique (French)
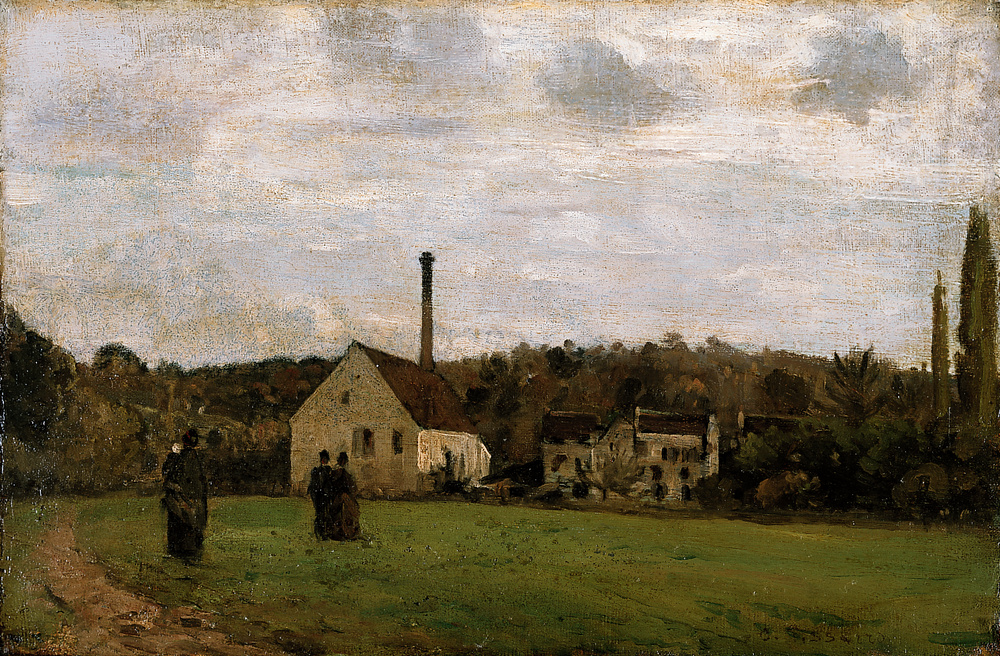
- Artist: Camille Pissarro
- Year: c. 1862–1865
- Catalogue: 130 (Wildenstein 2005)
- Medium: oil painting on canvas
- Movement: Landscape painting Barbizon school
- Subject: a factory on a meadow, with people walking by
- Dimensions: 26.5 cm × 40.2 cm (10.4 in × 15.8 in)
- Location: Musée d'Art moderne et contemporain, Strasbourg
- Accession: 1924

The Little Factory (French: La Petite Fabrique) is an oil painting on canvas by the French artist Camille Pissarro, from c. 1862–1865.

== History ==
The small work is thought to have been painted between 1862 and 1865. It was presented to the Strasbourg museum by the Société des amis des musées de la ville de Strasbourg (today called the Société des amis des arts et des musées de Strasbourg, or SAAMS) in 1924 and is now in the Musée d'Art moderne et contemporain. Its inventory number is 55.974.0.684.

== Transition ==
La Petite Fabrique marks a transition in Pissarro's work, away from Neoclassical landscape depictions à la Camille Corot and towards Realism with underlying social motives. In spite of its peacefulness and nonthreatening size, the little factory announces the inexorable transformation (i. e. industrialisation) of the countryside.

== See also ==
- List of paintings by Camille Pissarro
