= A Cowherd at Valhermeil, Auvers-sur-Oise =

Painting by Camille Pissarro

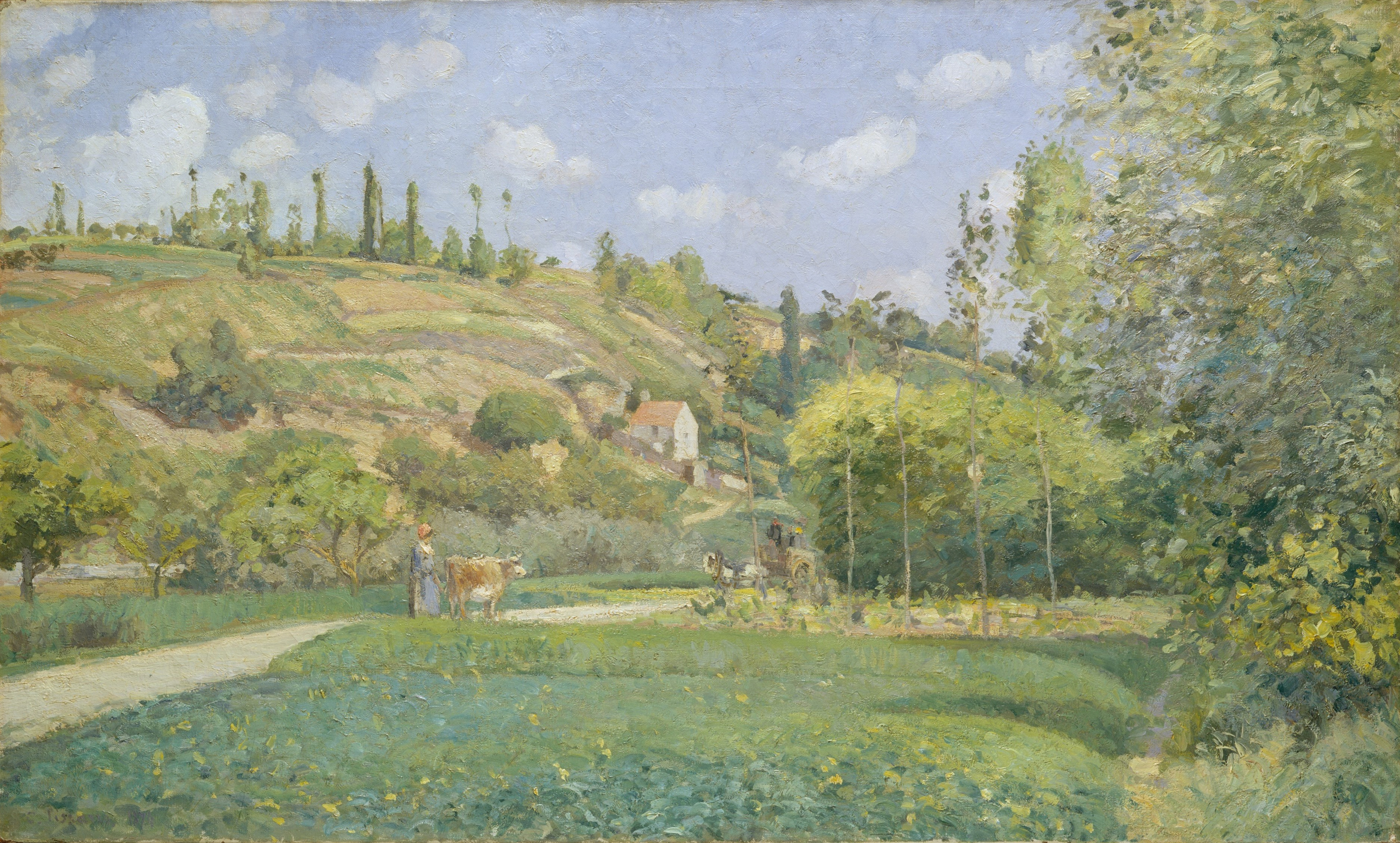
- Artist: Camille Pissarro
- Year: 1874
- Medium: Oil on canvas
- Movement: Impressionism
- Dimensions: 54.9 cm × 92.1 cm (21.6 in × 36.3 in)
- Location: Metropolitan Museum of Art; New York

A Cowherd at Valhermeil, Auvers-sur-Oise is an oil on canvas painting by Danish-French artist Camille Pissarro, from 1874. Done in oil on canvas, the work depicts the hamlet of Valhermeil in Auvers-sur-Oise, France, near Pontoise where Pissarro lived for several decades. The work, which is considered reflective of Pissarro's fascination and admiration for pastoral life, is in the collection of the Metropolitan Museum of Art.

== Description ==
This view shows one of the roads connecting the hamlet of Valhermeil in Auvers to Pontoise, the town northwest of Paris where Pissarro lived for many years. Between 1873 and 1882, he painted about twenty works in this area, several of which feature the same house with a red roof. Made in 1874, the year of the First Impressionist Exhibition, this painting is about villagers walking on paths through the countryside, which was a favorite of the artist, reflecting his interest in everyday rural life.

== See also ==
- List of paintings by Camille Pissarro
