= The Harvest, Pontoise =

Painting by Camille Pissarro

- La Récolte, Pontoise (French)
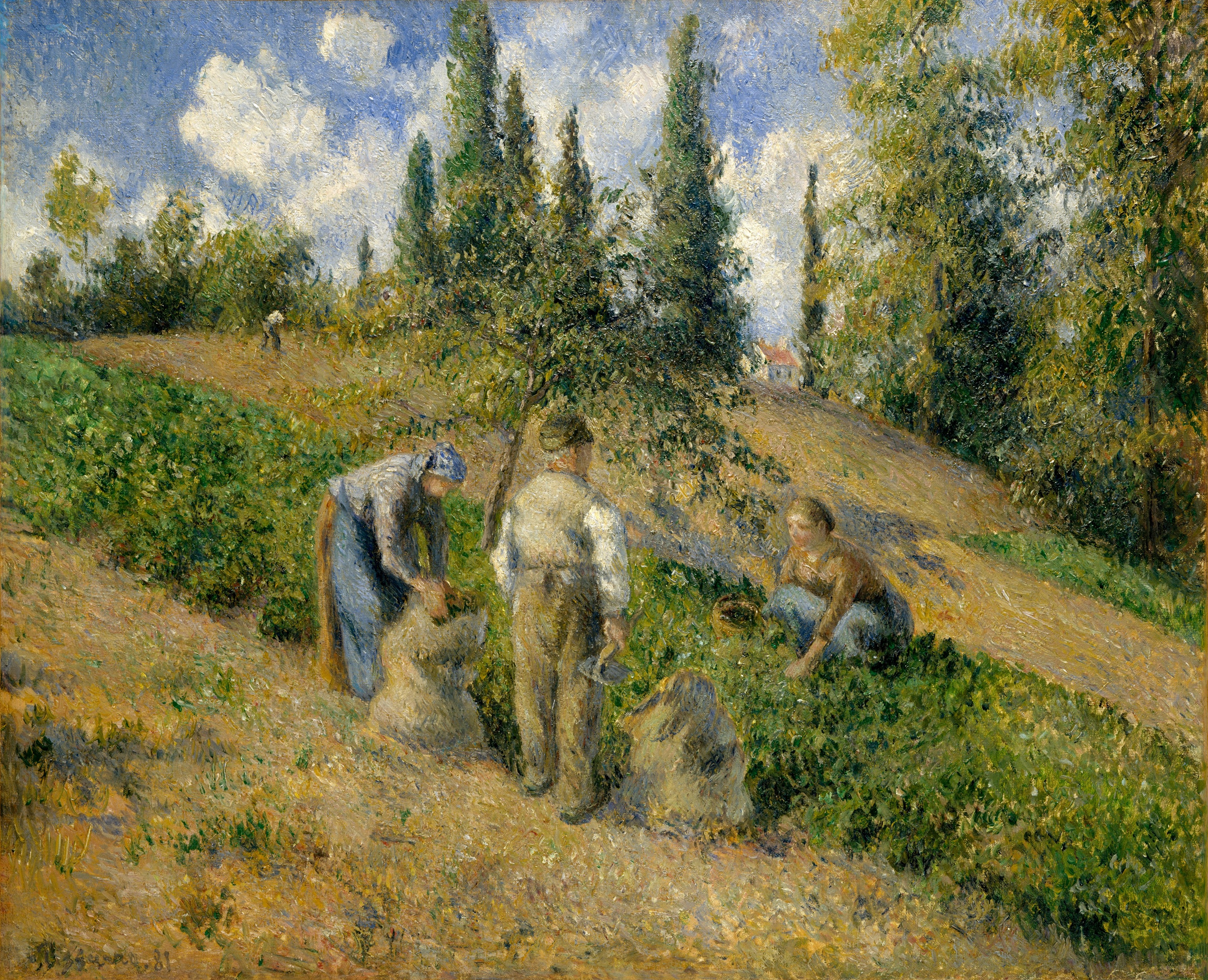
- Artist: Camille Pissarro
- Year: 1881
- Medium: Oil on canvas
- Dimensions: 46 cm × 55.2 cm (18 in × 21.7 in)
- Location: Metropolitan Museum of Art; New York City

The Harvest, Pontoise is a late 19th-century painting by Dano-French artist Camille Pissarro. Done in oil on canvas, the work depicts a group of French farmers gathering potatoes; such subject material was a common theme used by Pissarro. The painting is in the collection of the Metropolitan Museum of Art.

== See also ==
- List of paintings by Camille Pissarro
