= The Avenue, Sydenham =

Painting by Camille Pissarro

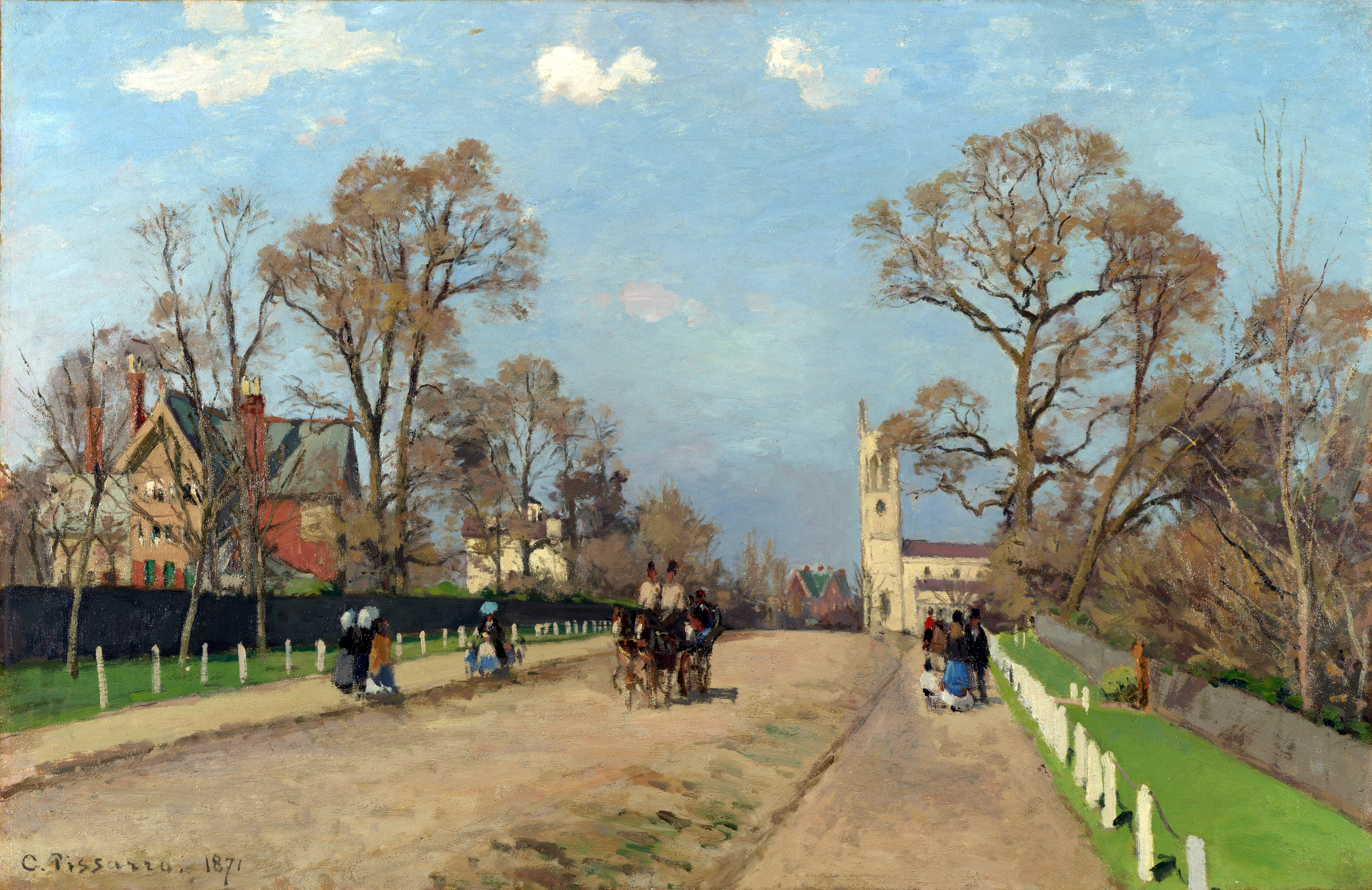
- Artist: Camille Pissarro
- Year: 1871
- Medium: Oil on canvas, landscape painting
- Dimensions: 48 cm × 73 cm (19 in × 29 in)
- Location: National Gallery, London

The Avenue, Sydenham is an oil on canvas landscape painting by the French artist Camille Pissarro, from 1871.

It depicts a scene in the middle-class suburb of Sydenham in South London, not far from Crystal Palace, capturing the everyday look of the Victorian era. The church seen is Saint Bartholomew's. Although reminiscent of the En plein air style, the painting was actually produced in Pissarro's studio.

Pissarro was an influential figure in the development of Impressionism but left France following the Franco-Prussian War and took refuge in England. This was one of twelve paintings in oils he produced during his initial stay, although he frequently returned in subsequent years. The picture is now in the collection of the National Gallery in London, having been acquired in 1984.

== See also ==
- List of paintings by Camille Pissarro

== Bibliography ==
- Bilston, Sarah. The Promise of the Suburbs: A Victorian History in Literature and Culture. Yale University Press, 2019.
- Pissarro, Joachim. Camille Pissarro. H.N. Abrams, 1993.
- Rothkopf, Katherine. Pissaro: Creating the Impressionist Landscape. Baltimore Museum of Art, 2006.
