= Pont Boieldieu in Rouen, Rainy Weather =

Painting by Camille Pissarro

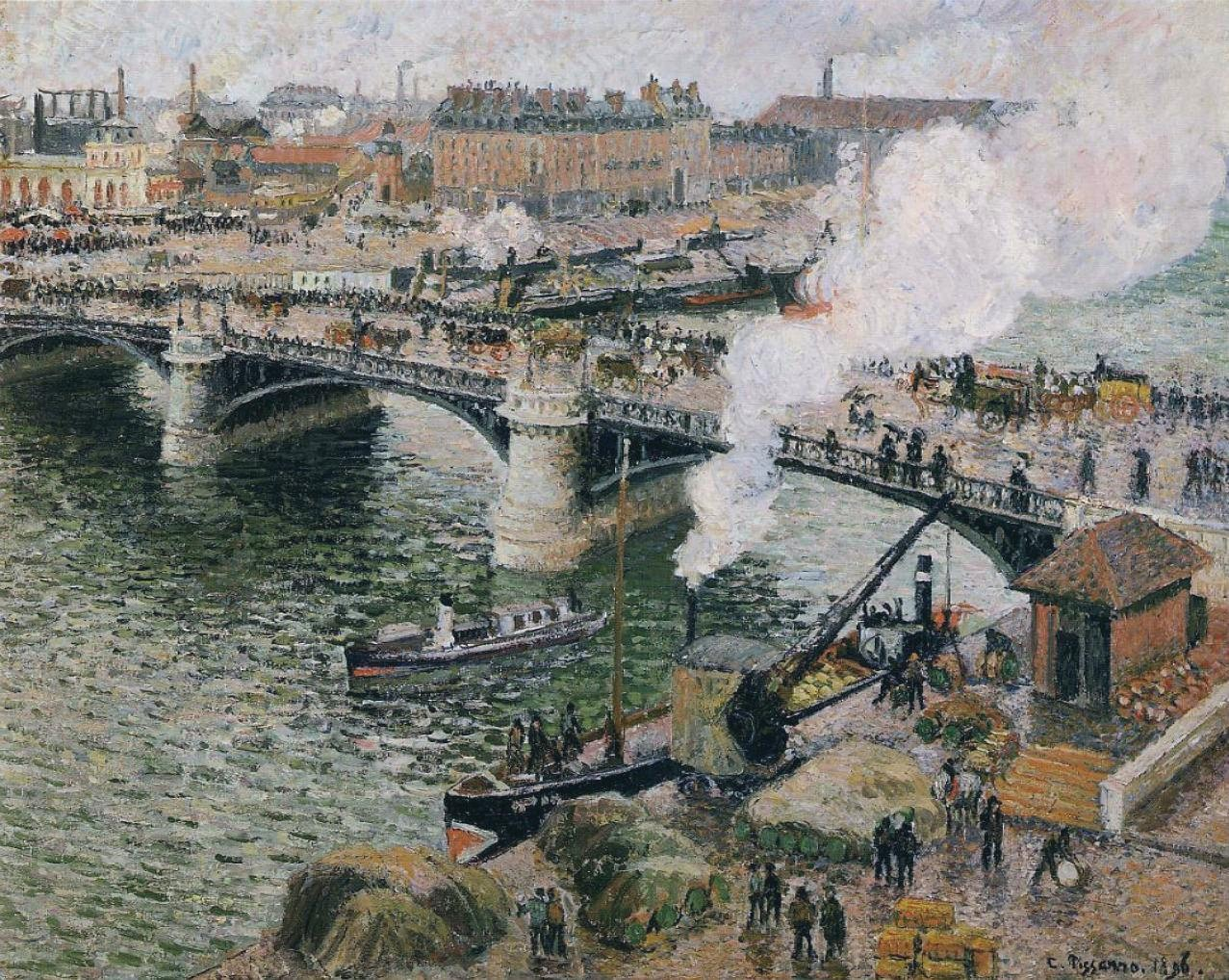
- Artist: Camille Pissarro
- Year: 1896
- Medium: Oil on canvas
- Dimensions: 73.6 cm × 91.4 cm (29.0 in × 36.0 in)
- Location: Art Gallery of Ontario, Toronto

Pont Boieldieu in Rouen, Rainy Weather is an 1896 painting by Camille Pissarro in the collection of the Art Gallery of Ontario.

It is one of a series of paintings Pissarro did of the Pont Boïeldieu and the industrial quays surrounding it. Pissarro spent time in Rouen in 1896 seeking to paint the industrial modernity of the area. He had earlier made a trip in 1883, and did one series of images of the city then. On this first 1896 trip he stayed at the Hôtel de Paris in Rouen from January to April 1896, during which time this painting was made. His room overlooked the Seine, and it is from this vantage point that it is painted.

The subject is the Pont Boieldieu, an iron bridge completed a few years before in 1885. Across the river is the Gare d'Orléans train station and the Place Carnot square. The painting shows Pissarro's interest in moving beyond traditional landscape paintings of verdant rural scenes. His Rouen series instead focuses on the bustle of the modern city. The Rouen pictures would be followed by a series of paintings of urban Paris. Style-wise, Pont Boieldieu in Rouen, Rainy Weather is a return to Impressionism after a decade of experimenting with Post-Impressionism and Pointillism. Pissarro deliberately sought out a view of the busy industrial section of the town, and produced a number of paintings of the view from the hotel in different light conditions and different weather. He did another picture of the Pont Boieldieu from the same angle, but in a foggy sunset that is today at the Musée des Beaux-Arts de Rouen.

In a letter written that year, Pissarro himself describes the painting: "The theme is the bridge near the Place de la Bourse with the effects of rain, crowds of people coming and going, smoke from the boats, quays with cranes, workers in the foreground, and all this in grey colors glistening in the rain." He further wrote, "what particularly interests me is the motif off the iron bridge in wet weather with all the vehicles, pedestrians, workers on the embankment, boats, smoke, haze in the distance; it's so spirited, so alive.

The painting was donated to the Art Gallery of Ontario by Reuben Wells Leonard upon his death in 1937. It is one of six Pissarros on public display in Canada, with two others at the AGO, and the others being at the National Gallery of Canada, Art Gallery of Hamilton and the Art Gallery of Greater Victoria.

Pissarro returned to the city later in the year, staying from September to November at a different hotel, from a balcony of which he executed a painting of the bridge from another angle.

== Gallery ==
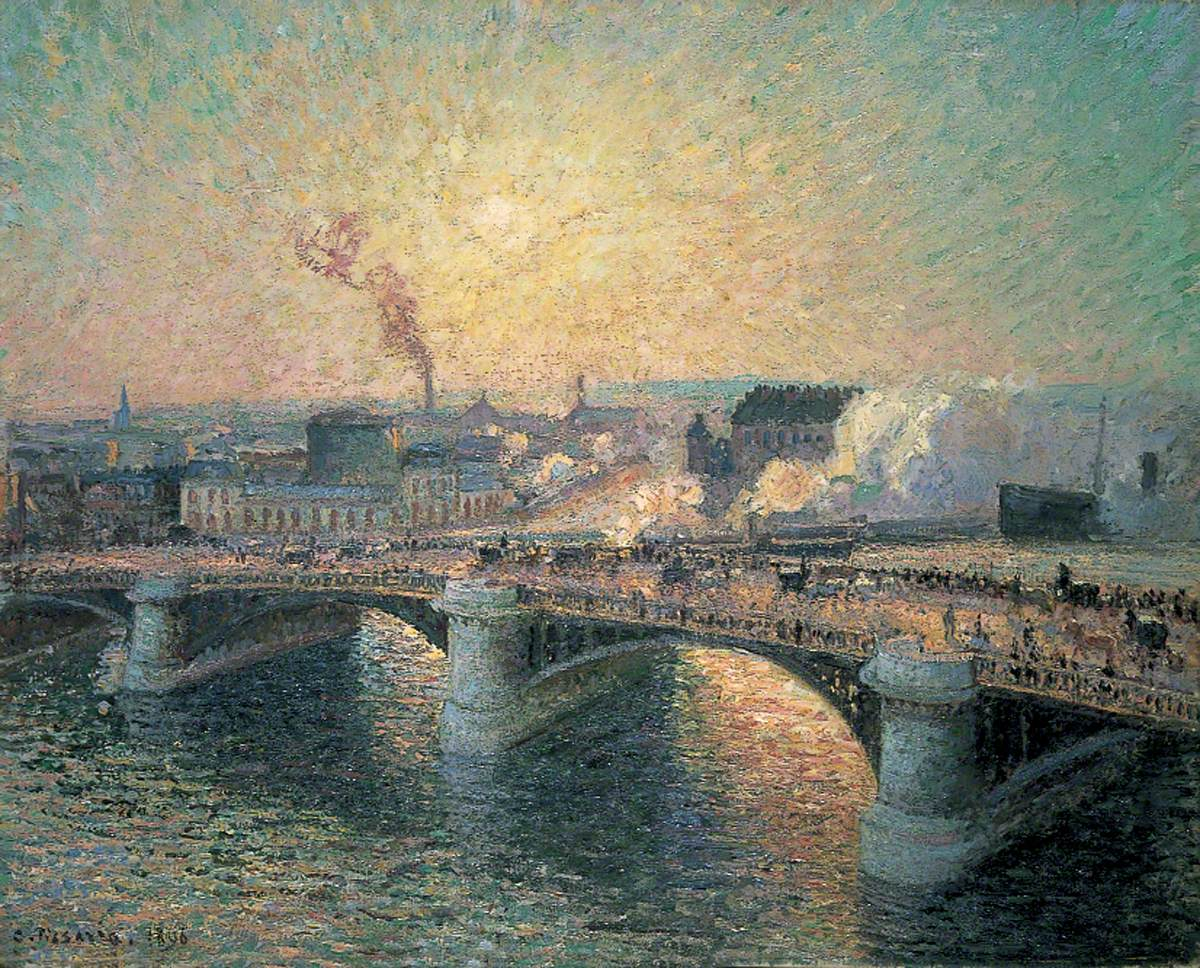
Pont Boieldieu, Sunset, Jan/Apr. 1896. (Birmingham Museum and Art Gallery, UK)

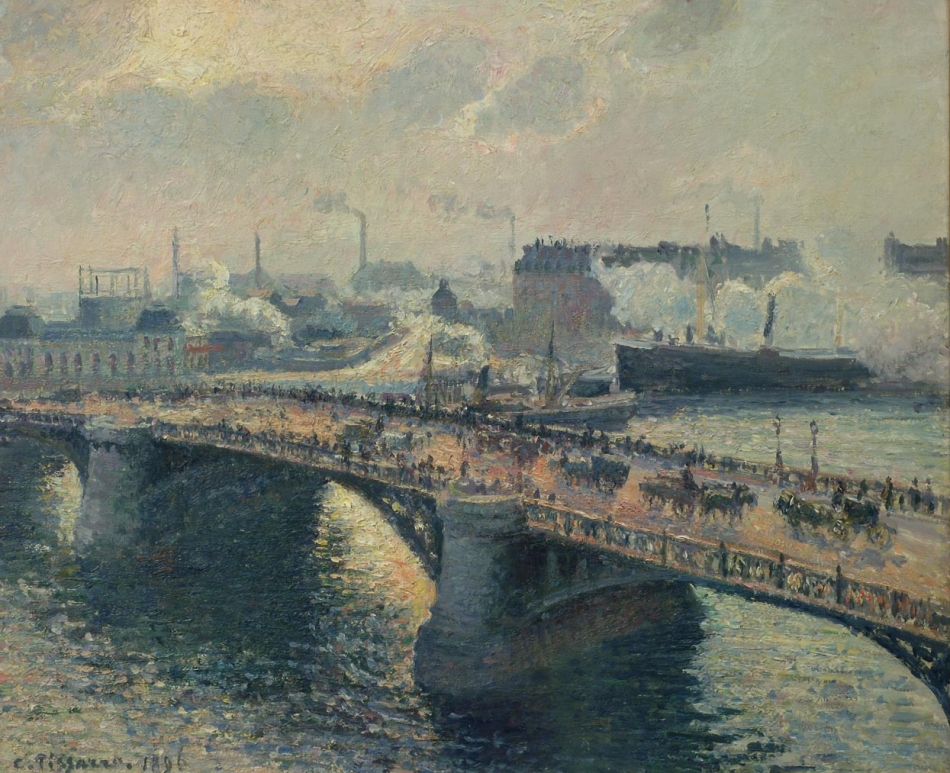
Pont Boieldieu, Sunset, Smoke, Jan/Apr. 1896. (Musée d'Orsay, Paris)

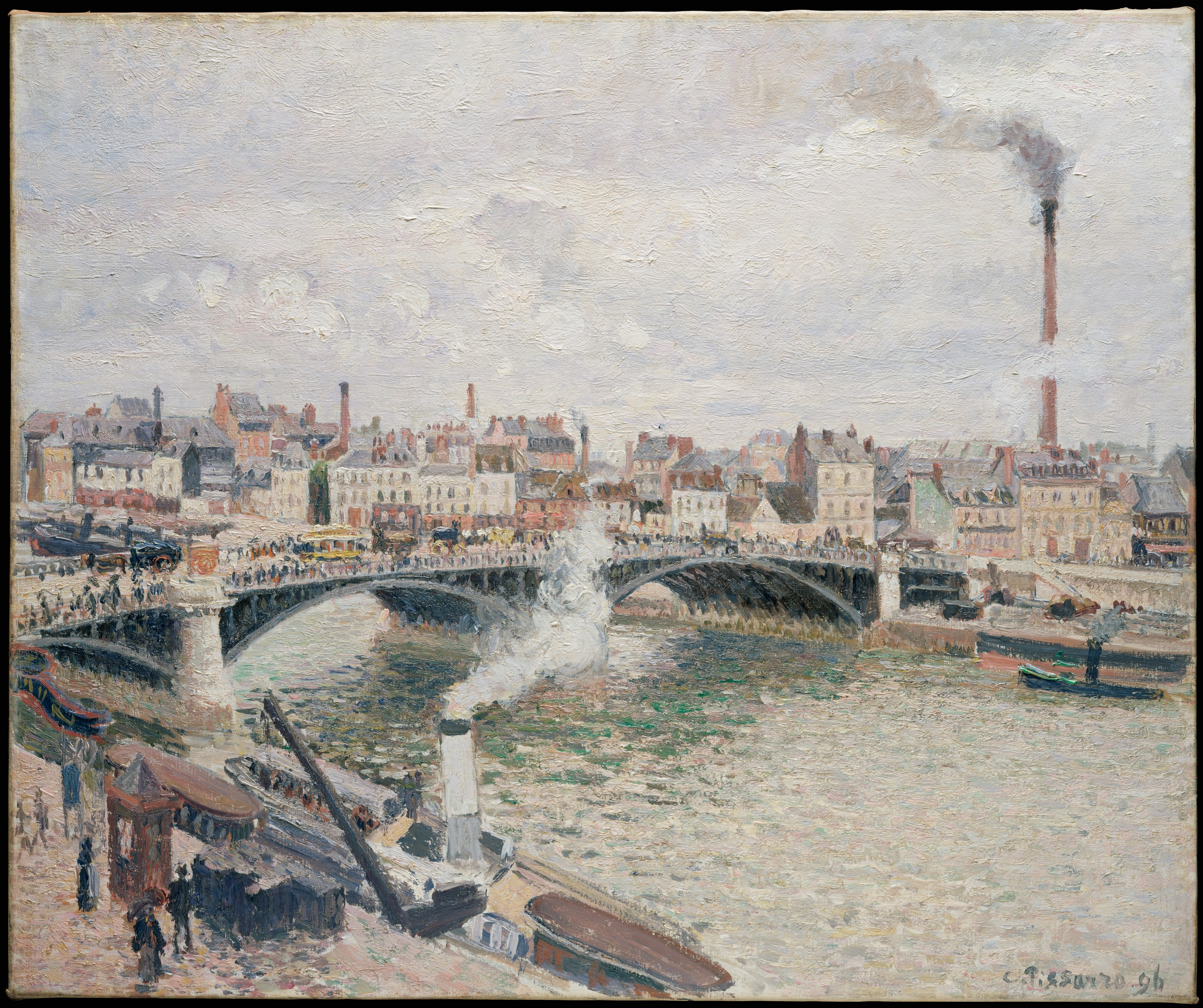
Morning, An Overcast Day, Rouen, Sep/Nov. 1896 (Metropolitan Museum of Art, New York)

== See also ==
- List of paintings by Camille Pissarro
