= Côte des Bœufs at L'Hermitage =

Painting by Camille Pissarro

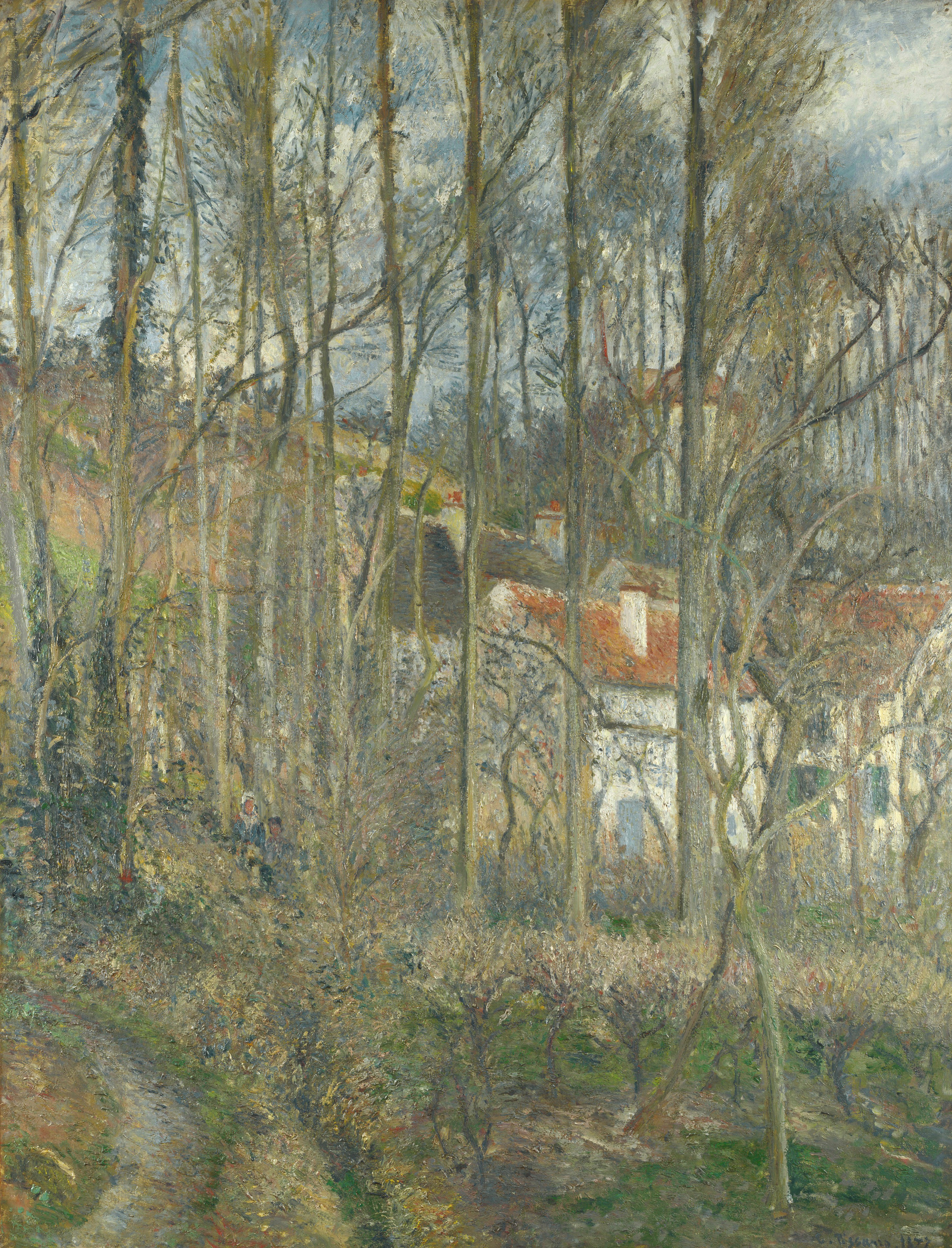
- Artist: Camille Pissarro
- Year: 1877
- Medium: Oil on canvas
- Dimensions: 115 cm × 88 cm (45 in × 35 in)
- Location: National Gallery, London

Côte des Bœufs at L'Hermitage is an oil-on-canvas landscape painting by the French Impressionist artist Camille Pissarro. It was painted in 1877, and displayed the same year at an exhibition now generally referred to as the third Impressionist exhibition. The picture is large by Pissarro's measure, and he described the effort of painting it as the 'work of a benedictine'. Pissarro was proud of the painting, and it remained in his family's possession until 1913. It presently hangs in the National Gallery, London.

== Location ==
In 1872 Pissarro moved for the second time to the commune of Pontoise some twenty miles north-west of Paris, where he lived with his family until 1884. The rolling hills of the close by neighbourhood of L'Hermitage provided the setting for a large number of Pissarro's paintings during his stays at Pontoise.

The Côte des Bœufs ('cattle ridge') is a steep hill face just north of the River Oise, and just west of the rue de L'Hermitage—the Departmental road passing through the neighbourhood. The name is acquired from a hillside pathway called the sente des Boves ('cattle snicket'—Boves being a Latin word, translating into French as Bœufs). From this location in particular Pissarro painted scenes on five occasions in three different decades.

== Composition, colour, and texture ==
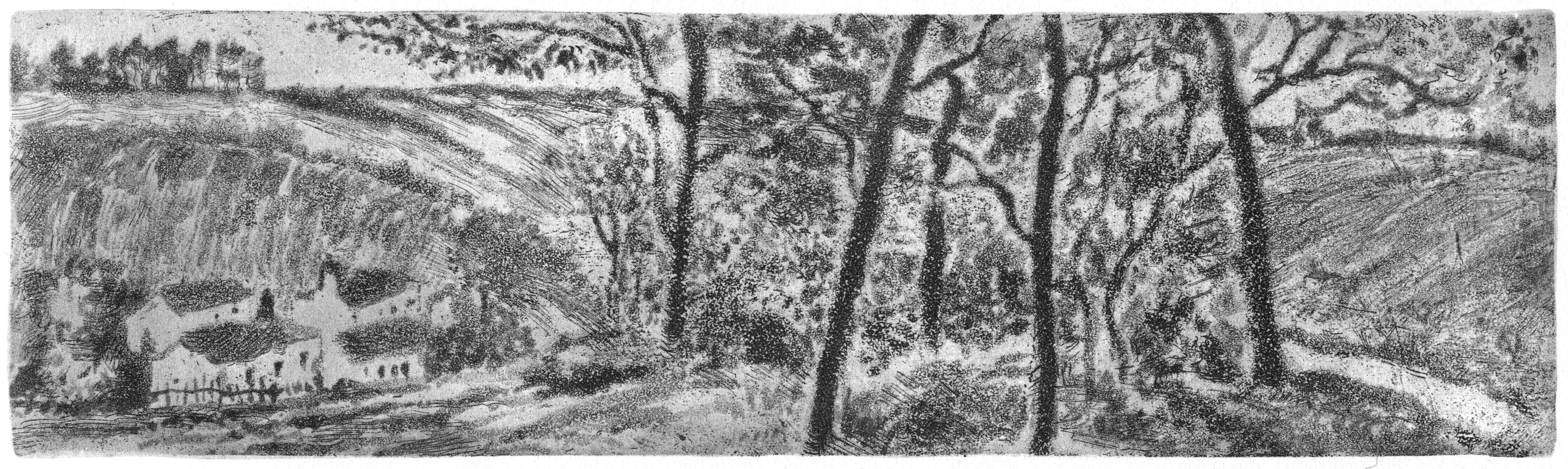
Paysage en long, 1879.

Pissarro's picture of a view up the hillside, his striking ranks of tree trunks and the lines of the buildings, as well as the atypically vertical format of this landscape painting, all create a strongly vertical dynamic. The sloping lines of the undergrowth, rooftops and hilltop contrast with the upward thrust of the work, but this contrast is toned down by the presence of the trees, which veil— almost screening off—the middle-distance, causing the viewer's eye to skid across the surface of the composition. The confident presentment of triangular gables climbing the hill shows some of the influence Paul Cézanne's technique of emphatic spatial compression, though Pissarro applies it without the aggression associated with Cézanne's method. Open sky appears to the top right of the picture, in the direction of which the branches of trees reach, echoing the lines of the gables.

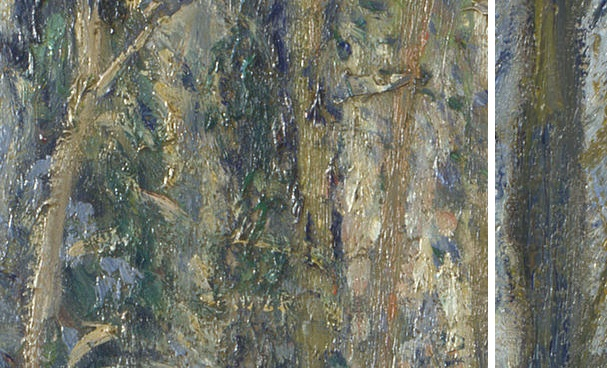
Details: different textural applications.

Pissarro's method of implying depth in this taut and confined picture relies in part on the careful control of light, colour and contrast. Throughout the painting, combinations in close proximity of different colours and tones are observed. At the foreground, physically neighbouring colours and tones are at their darkest and most densely compact. This use of immediate—sometimes incongruous—contrasts has an exaggerative effect on the foreground's strong colour saturation; itself a component in the effect of aerial perspective. In addition to this local differentiating of the range and compactness of contrasting pigments, Pissarro also variegated the work in a more general way; the predominant colour at the foreground is green, and as the picture recedes, the use of greens is gradually discounted and hues of red are subtly amplified. Just after the completion of this painting, Pissarro made prints such as his Paysage en long, and Paysage sous bois, à l'Hermitage (both 1879) wherein he experimented with similar methods of deploying degrees of light and contrast to denote depth.

The surface of The Côte des Bœufs at L'Hermitage is heavily worked. In many parts of the painting, brush-strokes are applied over dried and hardened earlier layers of paint. In some places such as in the tree trunks, these layers appear as having been being applied in long and sometimes thin strokes of parallel—or near parallel—directions. Sometimes the more lightly applied later layers are seen skipping along the peaks and valleys of an earlier layer. Although Pissarro went to these lengths to effect a particular textural plasticity at the painted surface, he did not always extend this in such a way as to fully represent the actual plasticity of the trees—going so far in some areas as to paint them with no clearly defined edges.

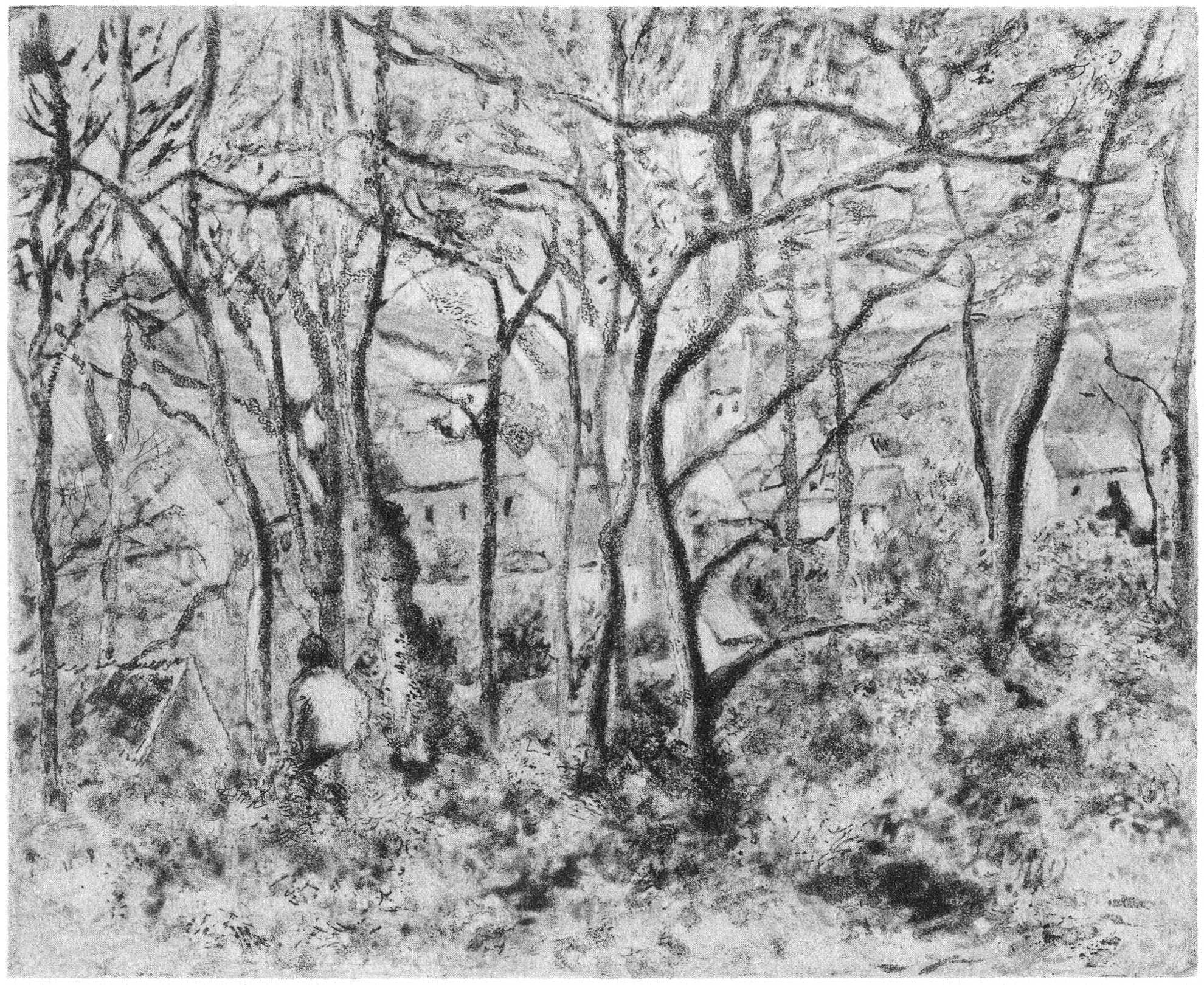
Paysage sous bois, à l'Hermitage, 1879.

In other areas such as that of undergrowth to the fore, shorter strokes have been criss-crossed, creating an effect not unlike that of a woven fabric. In addition to this labour-intensive technique of layer-building, Pissarro used the more traditional method of applying paint with impasto to consolidate the picture's texture. The technique of painting kaleidoscopically criss-crossing areas has the effect of attracting the eye and drawing it into the pattern, but the price of achieving this is the apparent submerging of details—such as those of the two people ambling down the hill—beneath impasto and contending colours. The critic Charles Ephrussi commented in 1880 on the 'doughy, fleecy, tormented surface' of Pissarro's work, and this imprisoning of matter beneath motif displeased Pissarro, who frequently complained that his method was lacking in visual clarity.

== Painting materials ==
Pissarro's handling of colour in this painting is intricate as is described in the above paragraph but his palette is rather limited. The subdued tonal structure was not achieved by the use of dull earth colours but by mixing pure strong pigments such as ultramarine, vermilion, emerald green and chrome yellow. In the last stages Pissarro added strong accents of pure ultramarine and vermilion in small areas of the painting.

== History of the painting ==
Much of Pissarro's work from the 1860s and early 1870s was characteristically light, airy and panoramic, such as his painting of 1864–5, The Banks of the Marne at Chennevières. With the Montfoucault works of the middle 1870s, Pissarro turned to explore a narrower theme of peasant rurality, and with the wooded sous bois ('undergrowth') landscapes of the late 1870s, this quest for intimacy further constricted and darkened. In spite of this aesthetic contraction, some of the sous bois paintings were quite large and The Côte des Bœufs at L'Hermitage is in fact one of Pissarro's largest paintings. The densely treated surface, the extensive use of tone, the fragmented and overlaying strokes, and the theme of buildings seen through a screen of trees are all characteristic of his work at the end of the 1870s, and the abstractly and closely conceived internal rhythms are very remote from the clear air of the earlier pictures.

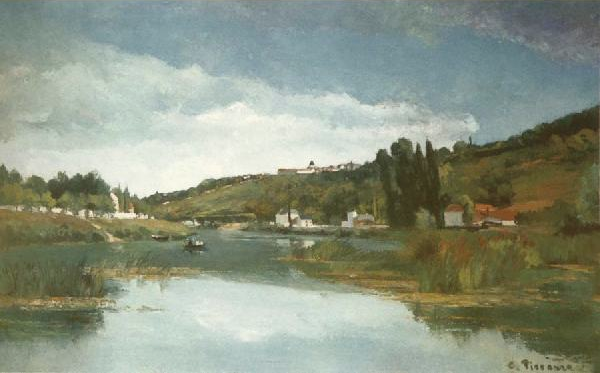
The Banks of the Marne at Chennevières, 1864–5.

In 1877 what is now known as the third Impressionist exhibition (though it was not then so-called) was held in Paris. There exists in the exhibition catalogue a record that a painting by Pissarro entitled Le verger, côte Saint-Denis, à Pontoise was displayed in the third gallery of the exhibition. This painting is almost certainly The Côte des Bœufs at L'Hermitage. Among those viewing at the exhibition were the Impressionist apologist Georges Rivière, who described it as 'a large landscape by Pissarro', and the critic Amedée Descubes who remarked on the 'attractive painting, a small house hidden away in the forest, which struck us by the firmness and simplicity of its brushwork'.

Pride of place in the third gallery at the exhibition was given to Pierre-Auguste Renoir's Bal du moulin de la Galette, and The Côte des Bœufs at L'Hermitage was displayed next to it. The rude and wintry hillside features, the anonymous peasant figures, and the worked and reworked surface of the Pissarro landscape are in dramatic contrast with the neighbouring Renoir painting's fleeting display of a summertime dance in Paris. A modern conception of Impressionism frequently puts a premium on the swift or improvised application of paint to the canvas, but this important characteristic is clearly absent in Pissarro's laboriously constructed picture. The close proximity of these two works, painted by two artists then recognised to be at the centre of the movement now called Impressionism, graphically highlighted the artistic tensions native to the Impressionist school.

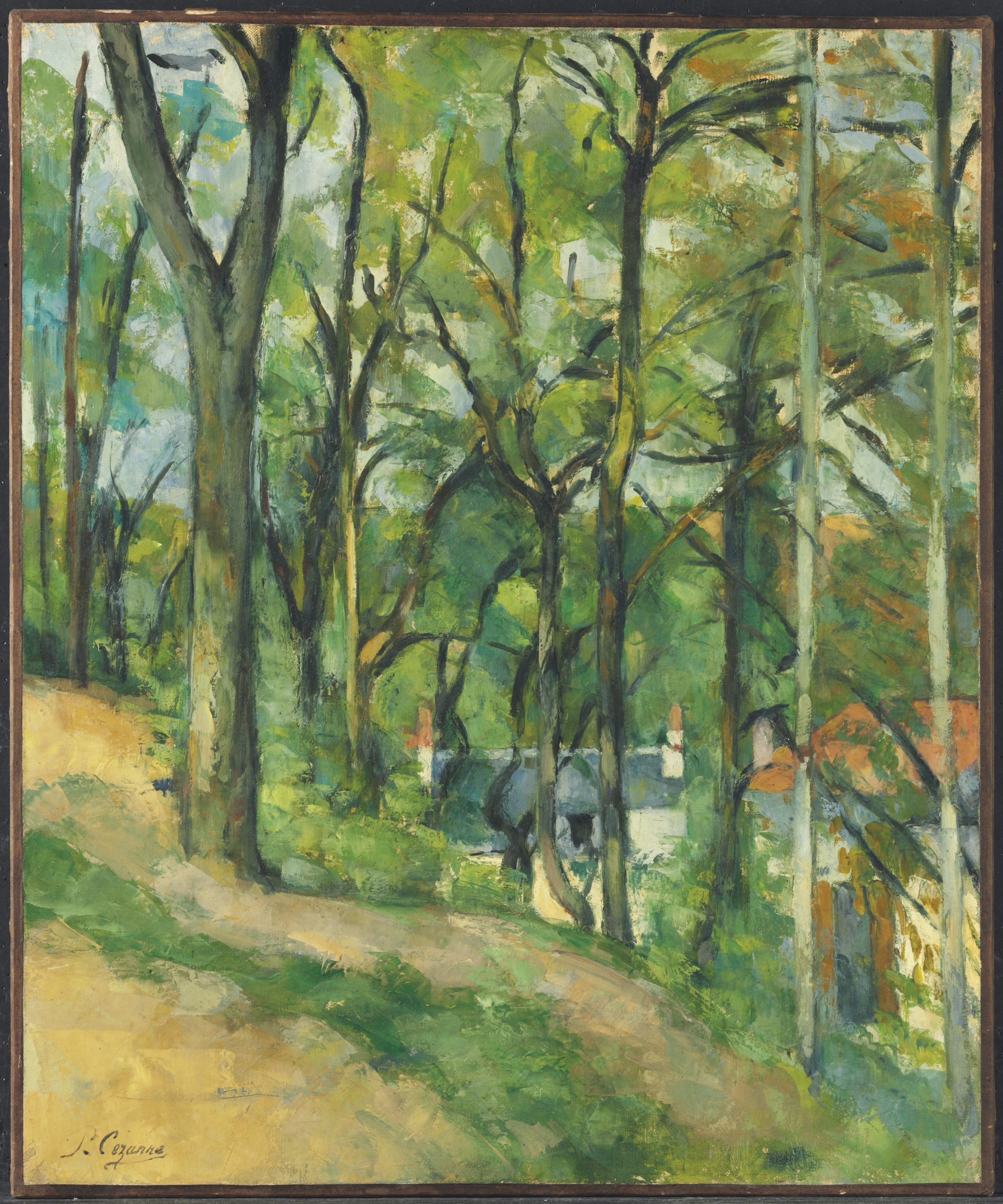
Paul Cézanne, The Orchard, Côte Saint-Denis, 1877.

The same year Pissarro painted The Côte des Bœufs at L'Hermitage, his friend Paul Cézanne painted his The Orchard, Côte Saint-Denis. The two artists had been friends for many years and had collaborated on a large number of works between 1865 and 1885. This Cézanne painting was also displayed, along with Pissarro's Côte des Bœufs and Renoir's Bal and other paintings, in the third gallery at the exhibition, but it was listed in the catalogue simply as being one of four examples of Cézanne's Paysage; Etude d'après nature. Although the place-names in the latterly adopted titles of both the Cézanne painting and the Pissarro painting refer to the same location, it is not clear that both paintings actually show exactly the same spot. However, a number of very obvious themes such as those of the strongly coloured roof tiles, the precipitously dropping hillside, and of buildings seen through trees, are common to both pictures.

In 1923 when the painting was in the possession of the Knoedler Gallery (London), the artist Walter Sickert wrote, "The large canvas by Pissarro entitled La Côte des Boeufs, with its beautiful and highly complicated intricacies of design, its solidity of architecture, and a certain human warmth and tenderness, is perhaps as important an example of this insufficiently appreciated painter's work as any that exists. A writer is to-day almost afraid to use of a work of art the term "laborious". He would probably be supposed to imply depreciation, or to be indulging in the irony that is almost de rigueur. But the charm of a picture like this lies chiefly in its immense and indefatigable laboriousness, in labour so cunning, so swift and so patient, that the more it is piled up, the greater the clarity and simplicity of the result. "Un travail de Bénédictin," as I have heard himself call it."

== Provenance ==
The Côte des Bœufs at L'Hermitage hung in Pissarro's bedroom for many years, and at his one-man show in 1892, he asked an optimistically large figure of 2000 francs for it. In 1913, the artist's wife, Julie Pissarro, sold the painting to the Galerie Bernheim-Jeune, who in turn sold to it to Knoedler (of Old Bond Street, London) in 1920. The work was presented to the Tate Gallery in 1926—funded by a bequest from the National Art Collections Fund—and was transferred to the National Gallery, London in 1950.

== See also ==
- List of paintings by Camille Pissarro
