= Morning, An Overcast Day, Rouen =

Painting by Camille Pissarro

- Matin, Temps Gris, Rouen (French)
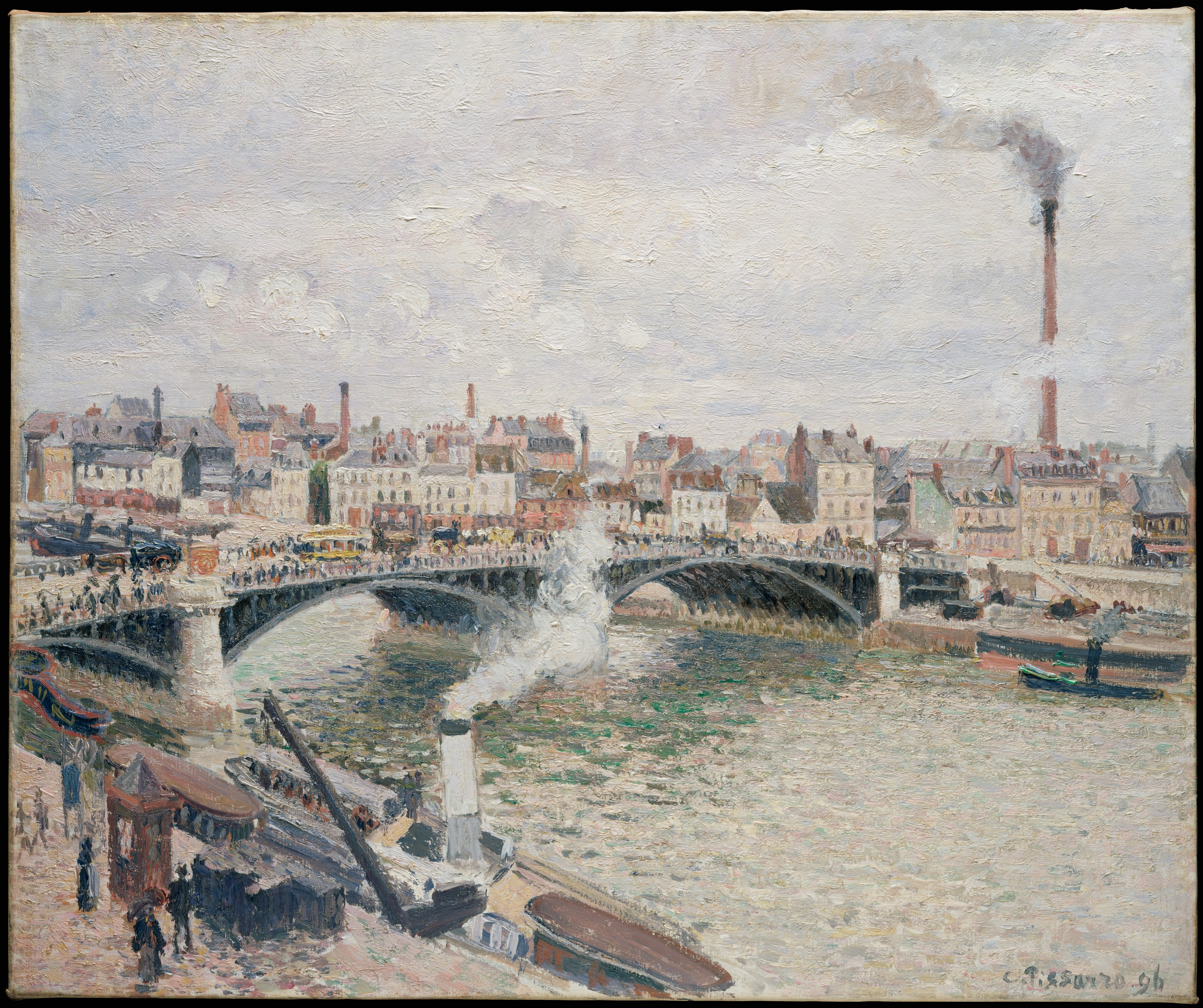
- Artist: Camille Pissarro
- Year: 1896
- Subject: Boieldieu Bridge, Rouen
- Dimensions: 54.3 cm × 65.1 cm (21.4 in × 25.6 in)
- Location: Metropolitan Museum of Art, New York City

Morning, An Overcast Day, Rouen is a late 19th-century painting by Danish-French artist Camille Pissarro. Done in oil on canvas, the work depicts the industrial cityscape of Rouen, France. The centerpiece of the painting is Boieldieu Bridge, a steel arch bridge which Pissarro painted from his room in a nearby hotel. The painting is in the collection of the Metropolitan Museum of Art.

Pissarro had executed other paintings of the Boieldieu Bridge, in differing weather conditions, on a previous visit to Rouen earlier that year (1896).

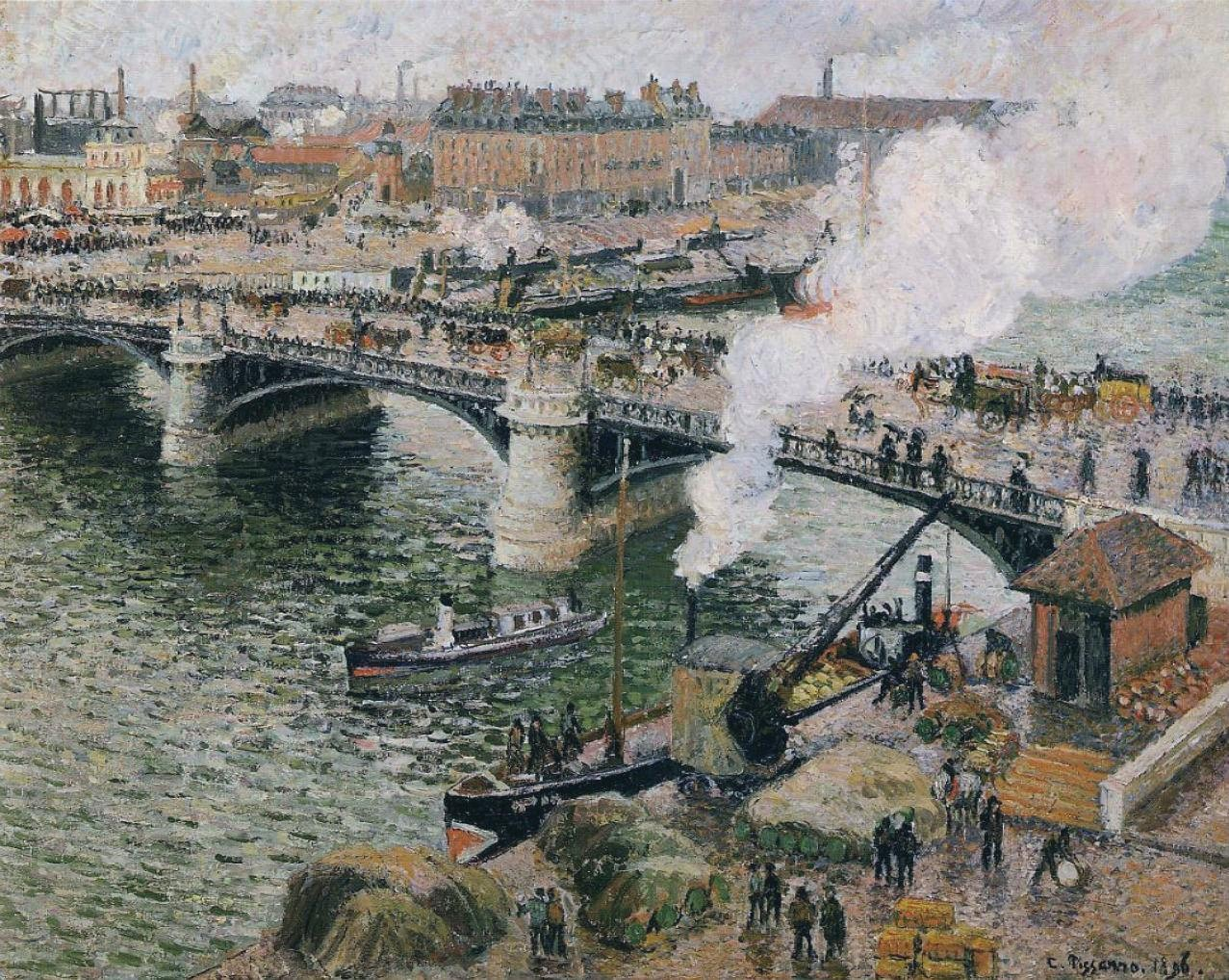
Pont Boieldieu in Rouen, Rainy Weather, 1896. (Art Gallery of Ontario)

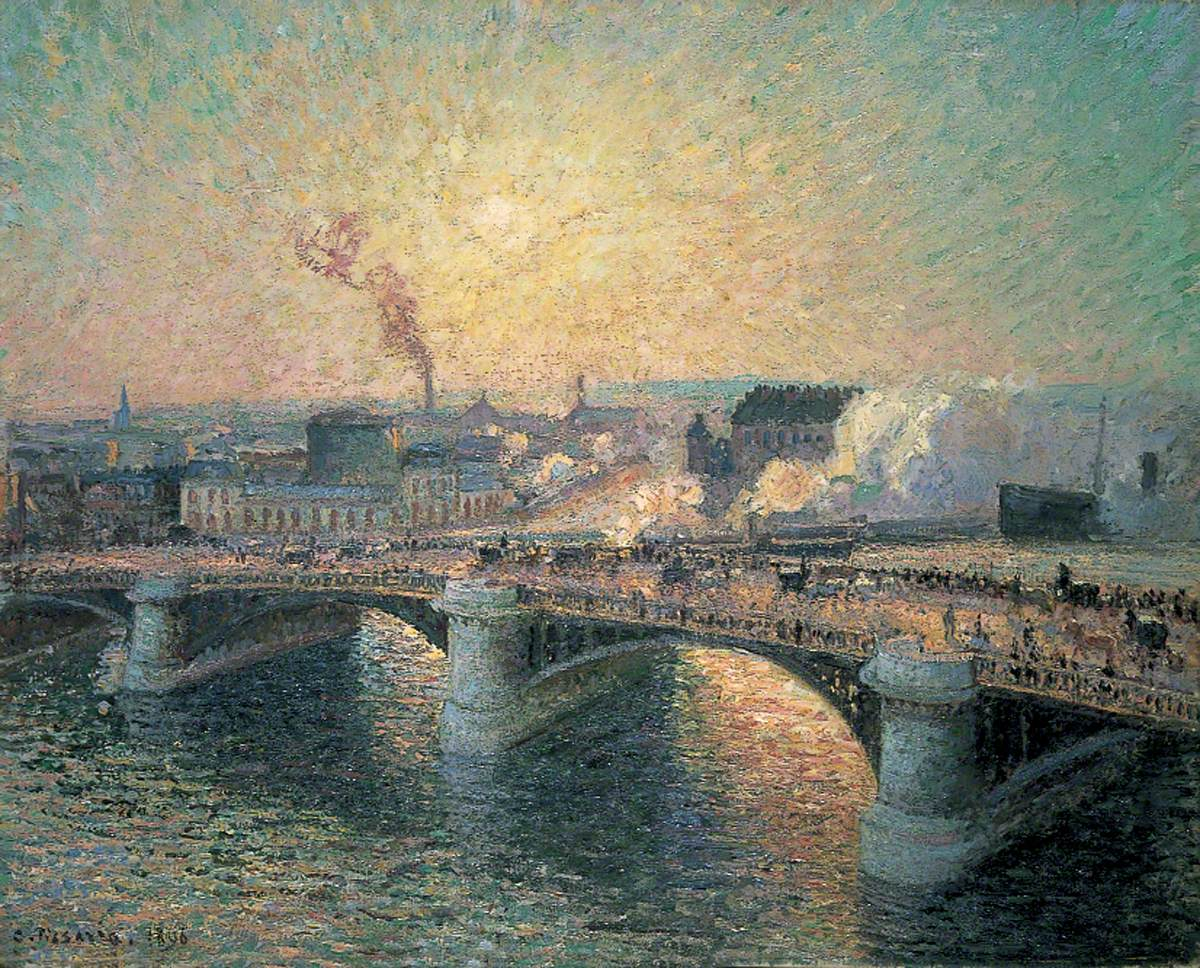
Pont Boieldieu, Sunset, 1896.(Birmingham Museum and Art Gallery, UK)

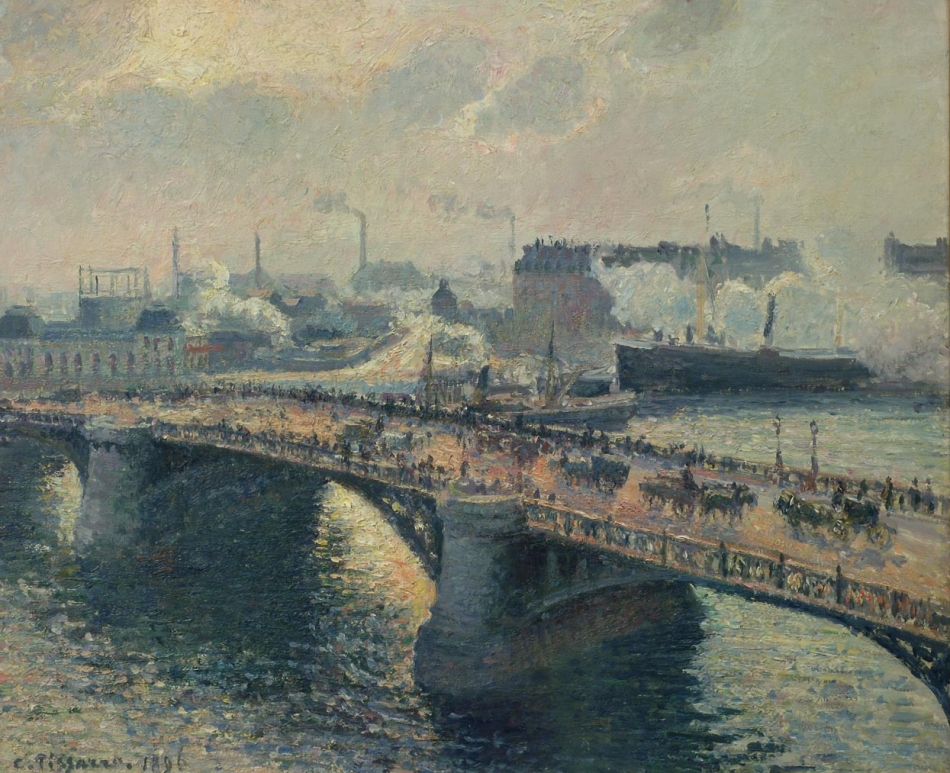
Pont Boieldieu, Sunset, Smoke, 1896. (Musée d'Orsay, Paris)

== See also ==
- List of paintings by Camille Pissarro
