= Hay Harvest at Éragny =

Painting by Camille Pissarro

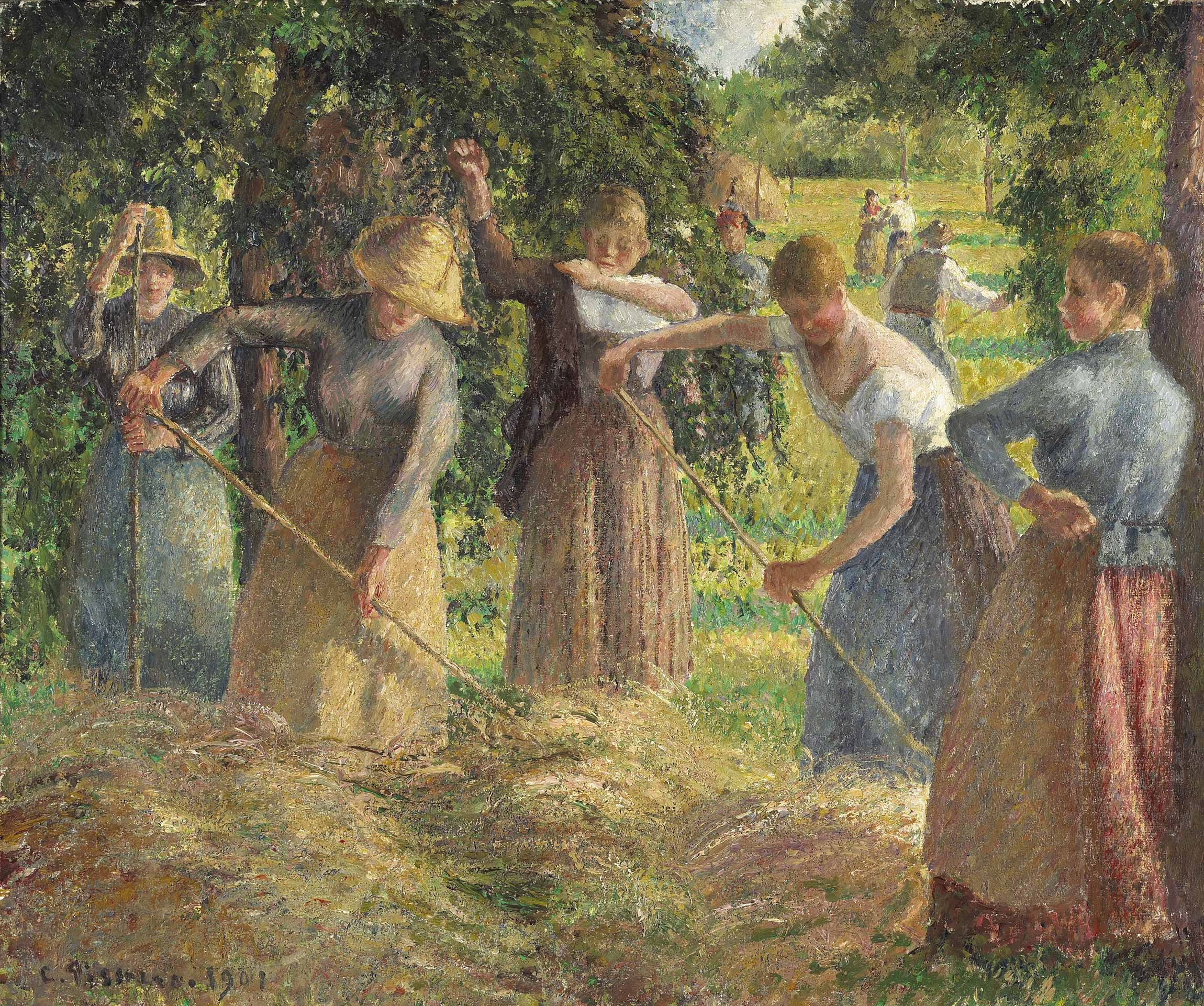
- Artist: Camille Pissarro
- Year: 1901
- Medium: oil on canvas
- Dimensions: 53.9 cm × 64.7 cm (21.2 in × 25.5 in)
- Location: National Gallery of Canada, Ottawa

Hay Harvest at Éragny (French: Fenaison à Éragny) is a 1901 painting by French Impressionist painter Camille Pissarro depicting the hay harvest in the French commune of Éragny-sur-Epte.

It is currently in the collection of the National Gallery of Canada, in Ottawa.

== See also ==
- List of paintings by Camille Pissarro
