= Boulevard Montmartre, Mardi Gras =

Painting by Camille Pissarro

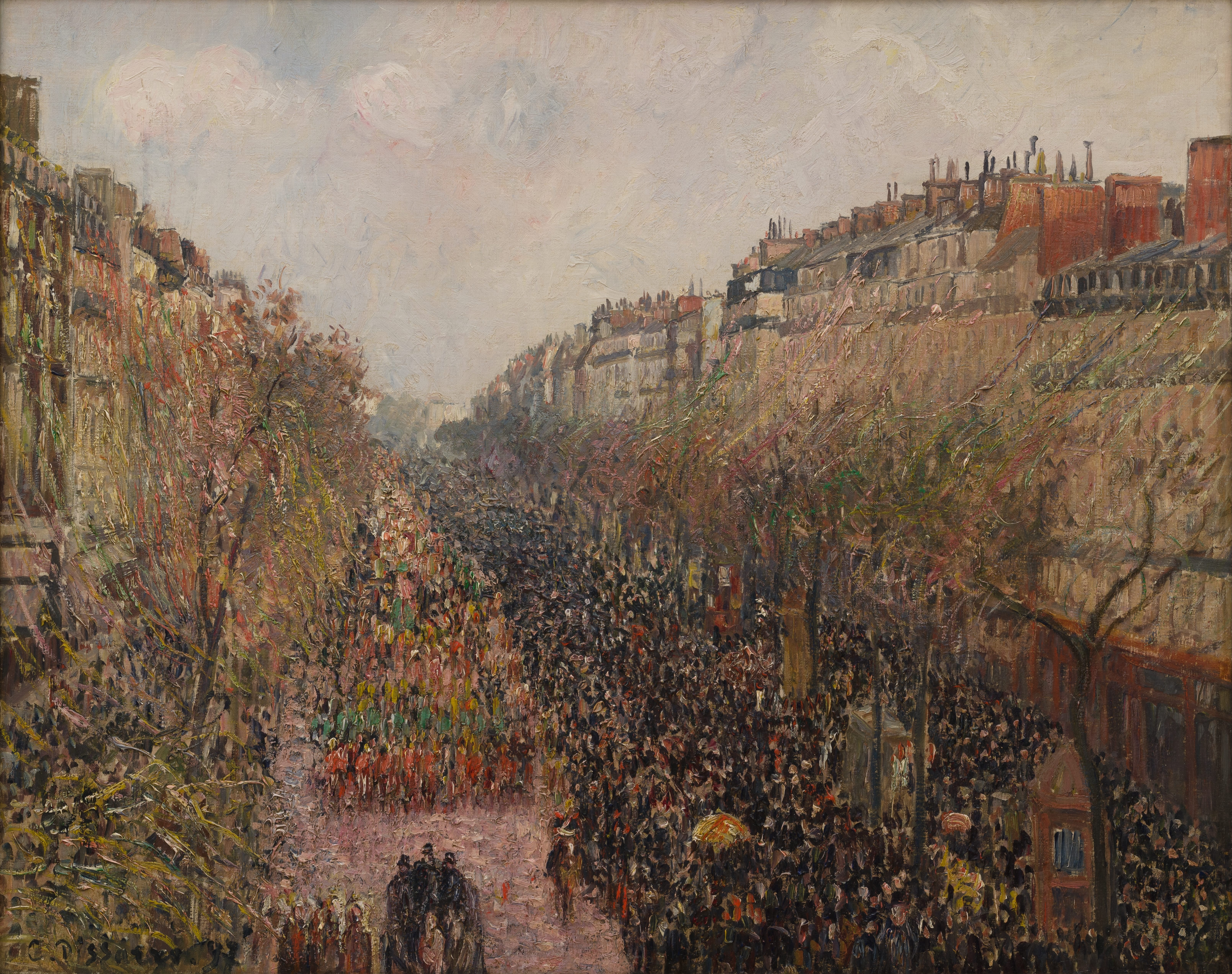
- Artist: Camille Pissarro
- Year: 1897
- Medium: Oil on canvas
- Dimensions: 65.1 cm × 81.3 cm (25.6 in × 32.0 in)
- Location: Armand Hammer Museum; Los Angeles

Boulevard Montmartre, Mardi Gras (Paris, 1897) by Camille Pissarro currently resides in the permanent exhibition at the Armand Hammer Museum in Los Angeles, California. This work is part of a series of fourteen paintings depicting different times of the day and seasons of the Boulevard Montmartre in Paris. Camille Pissarro is known as the "Father of Impression" for his "teacher's eye" of drawing what he saw in front of him.

Pissarro first sketched this idea, before using oil on canvas to paint from his balcony window of the Grand Hôtel de Russie overlooking the grand boulevard. He depicts a nineteenth century Mardi Gras procession, also known as the Carnaval de Paris from the streets below extending its grandeur far into the distance. The Carnaval de Paris also included a parade before the masked ball at the Paris Opera House. This street scene focuses on the idea of a "New Paris" that reveals an outdoor natural setting of beauty without adulteration in order to educate the public of real ideas. This painting marks one of Pissarro's last major works due to his weakening eyesight commonly associated with his elderly age. Many critics believe that this disability formed his appearance of unclear, spontaneous, artistic freedom.

== Technique ==
Pissarro's inspiration and artistic style was constantly evolving from the different environments he placed himself within. He studied at the Académie Suisse where he was introduced to two of the most influential people in his life: Claude Monet and Paul Cézanne. He moved around often in search of new inspiration and direction for his work. It was not until he returned to Paris and directed his attention from country landscapes to urban cities that emphasized the importance of order, proportion, and structure. His work depicts dynamic movement through his lack of attention to fine details, less individually drawn figures, and an increase of broad subjects portraying real life. His brushstrokes consists of short, loose, semi-thick strokes to enhance the idea of motion running through his work. At first glance, the work comes off as blurry and poorly painted until the viewer gazes at the painting and sees the qualities of details he positions through his stylistic brushstrokes. The clumps of men in black top coats and suits are significant to traditional ninetieth century dress and the men on horses signify the police patrolling the street parade. The trees in front of the building are intricately stylized for the viewer to believe there are streamers flying through the winding trees. Pissarro designs the French Baroque architecture of the building as a static subject by its clarity and attention to detail of traditional French architecture.

== Pointillism Influence ==
This work has an influence of Pointillism which Pissarro tested as an emerging "scientific" theory of art before creating this work. However, he was not very talented in this style and shortly after absorbed the Neo-Impressionism style with a strong emphasis of an abnormal amount of brush strokes and overlapping details. Unlike most of the other paintings from the Boulevard Montmartre series, the lower half of this particular work references similar characteristics to pointillism by clustering primary colors throughout the painting. However, once seen in person, one can automatically notice the extent of blending the colors together instead of separate dots. Many also believe that his study of the Japanese art nouveau style instilled a sense of distance to the street's progression, which can be seen from the foreground's progress of linear perspective.

== Other paintings in the series ==
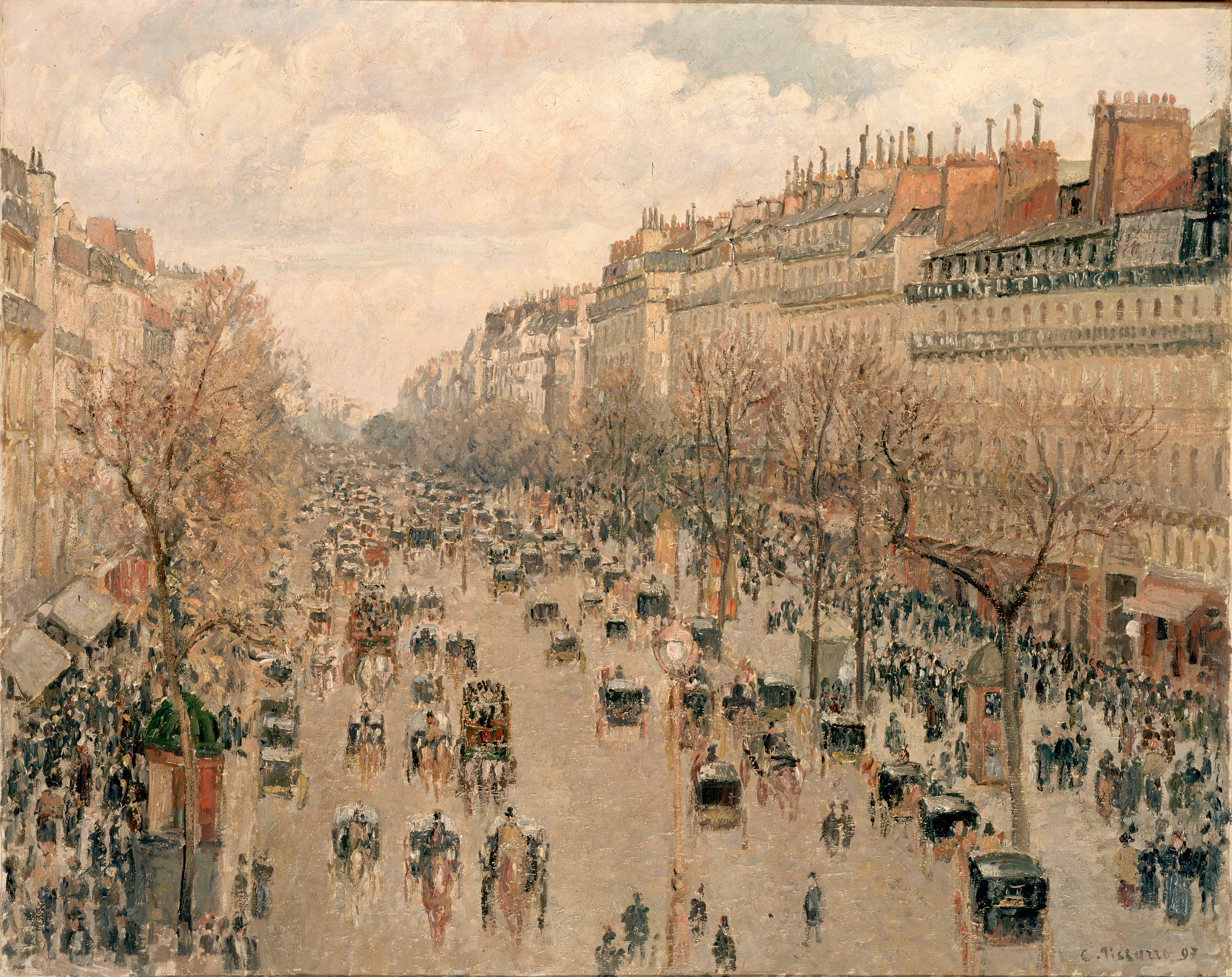
Boulevard Montmartre à Paris, 1897. Hermitage Museum

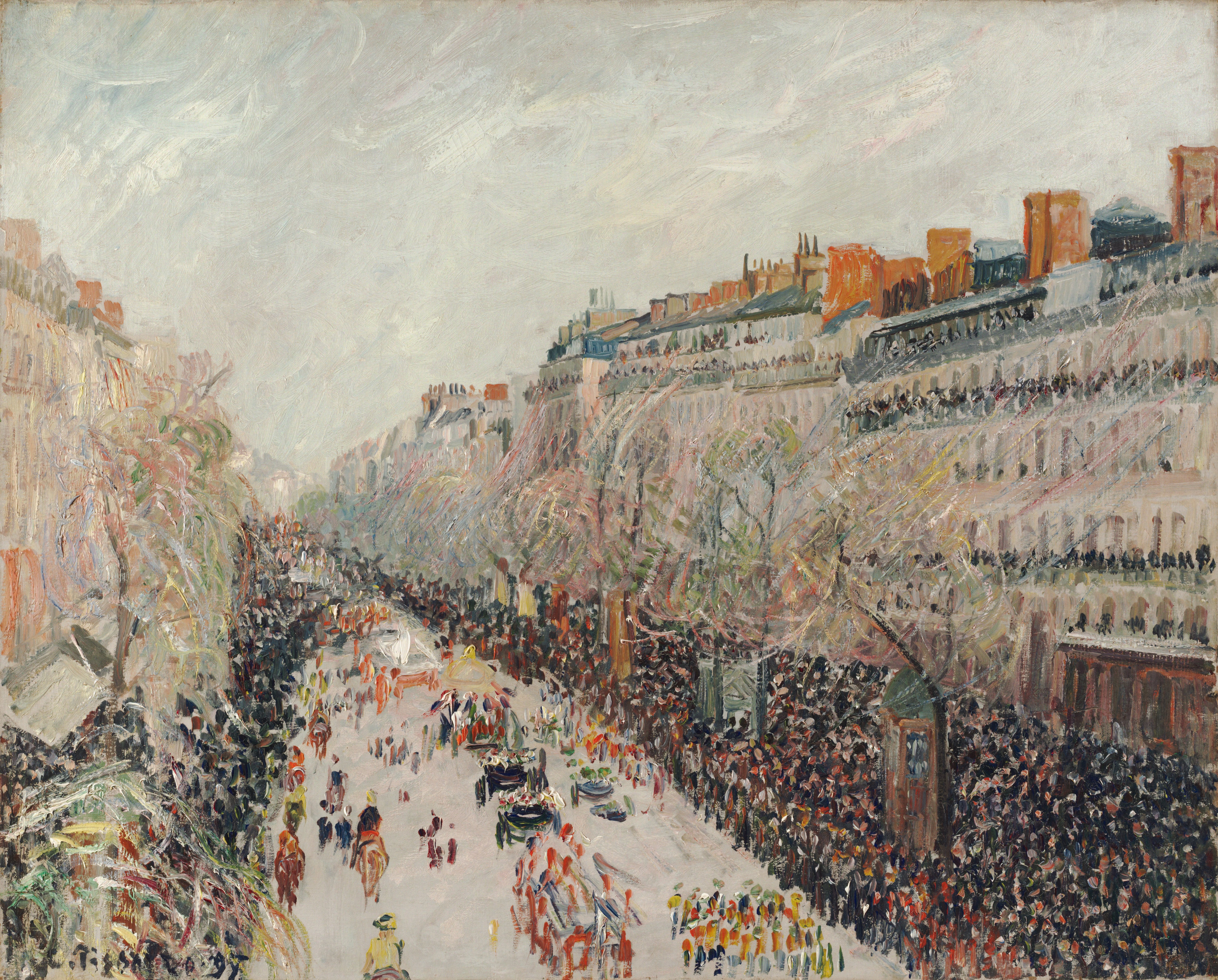
Mardi Gras on the Boulevards, 1897. Fogg Museum

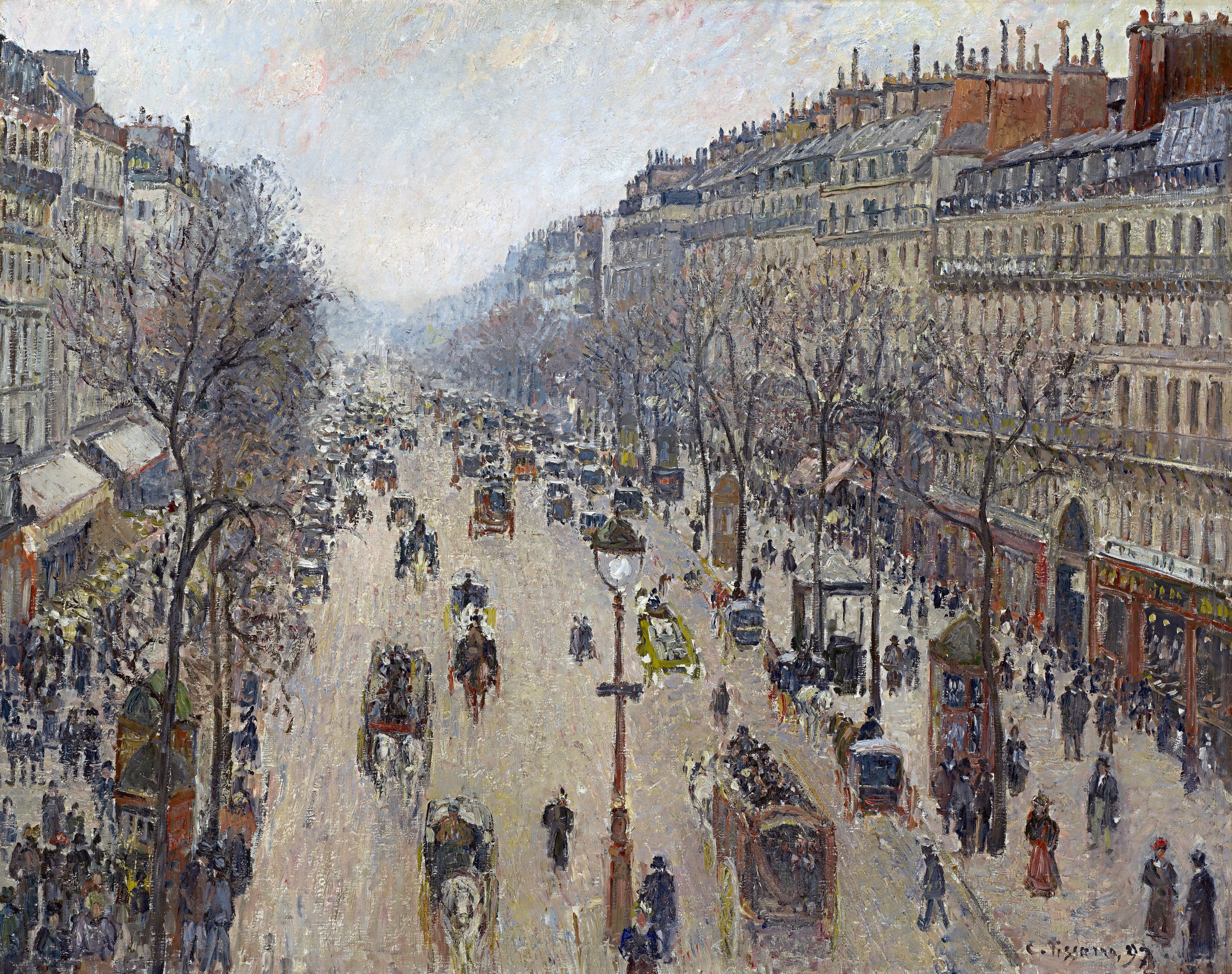
Boulevard Montmartre, morning, cloudy weather, 1897. National Gallery of Victoria

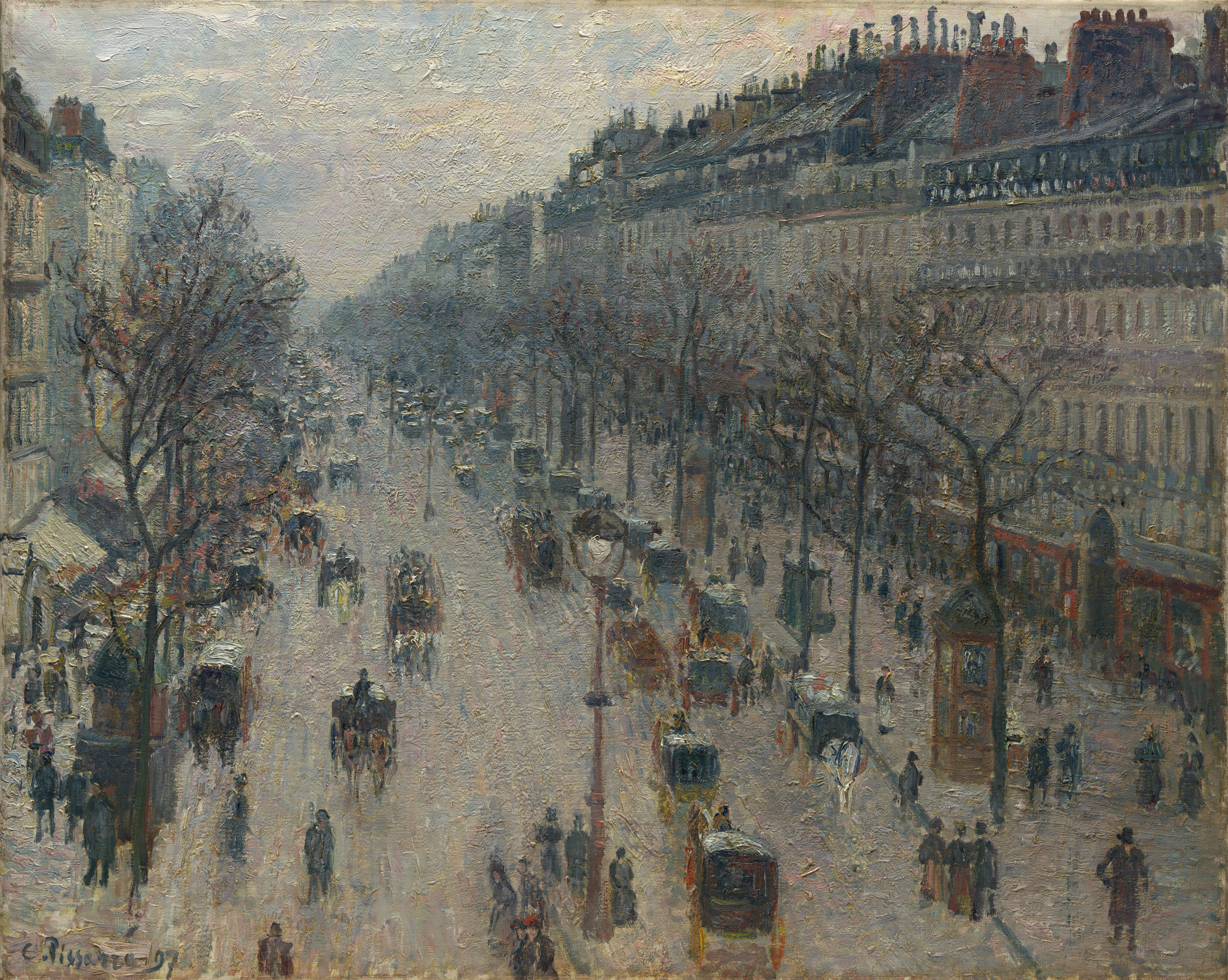
The Boulevard Montmartre on a Winter Morning, 1897. Metropolitan Museum of Art

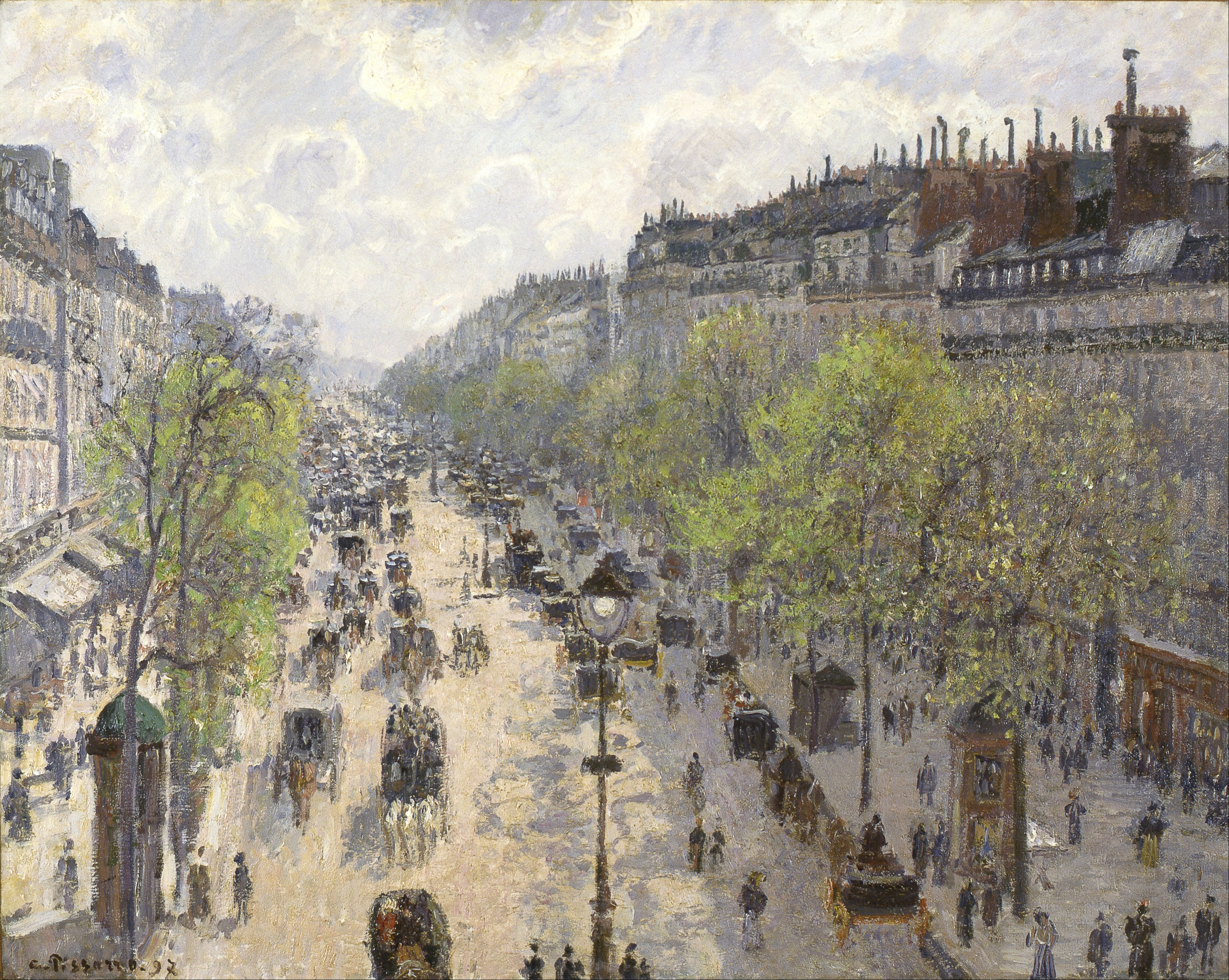
Le Boulevard de Montmartre, matinée de printemps, 1897. Private collection

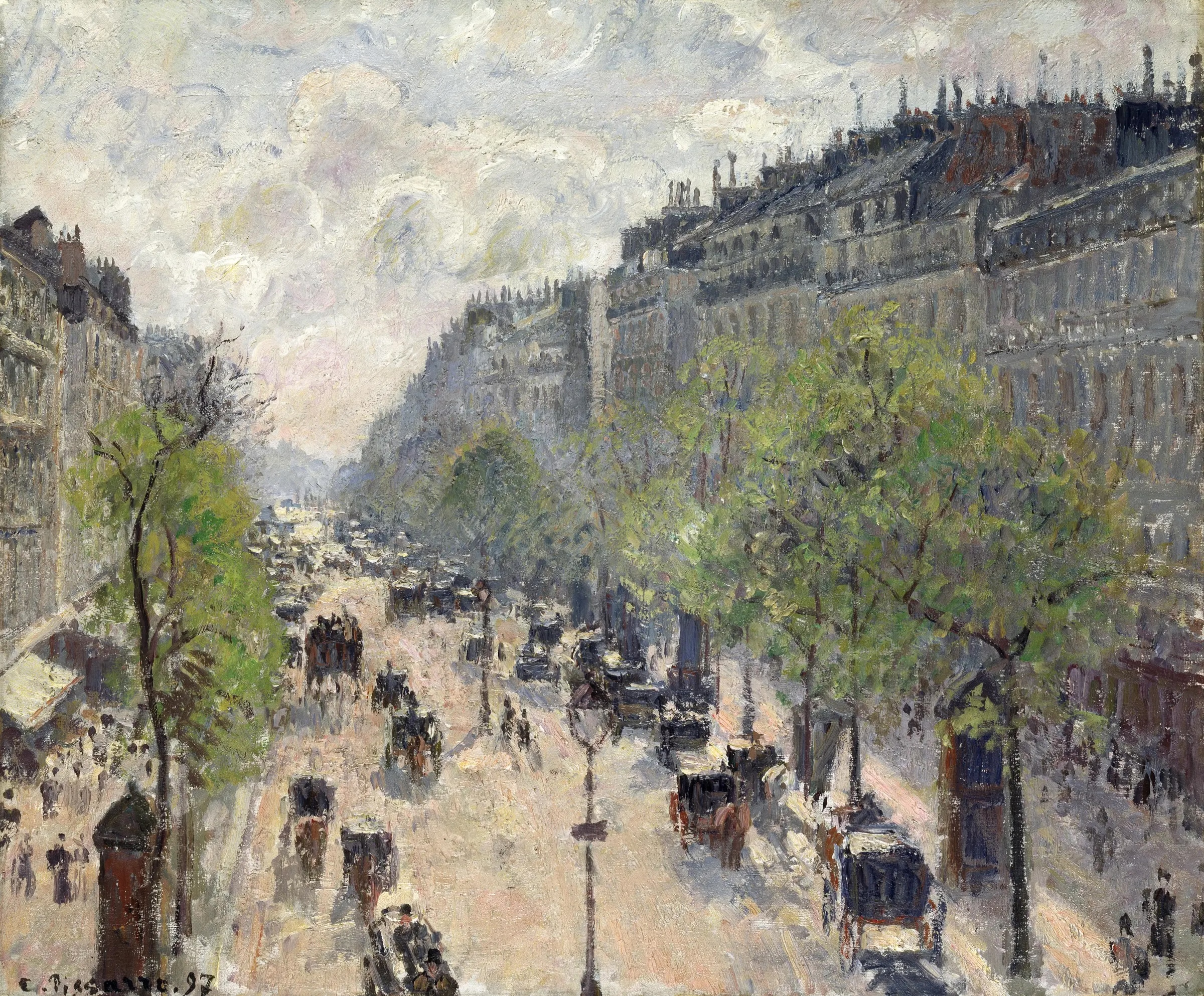
Boulevard Montmartre, Spring, 1897. Museum Langmatt

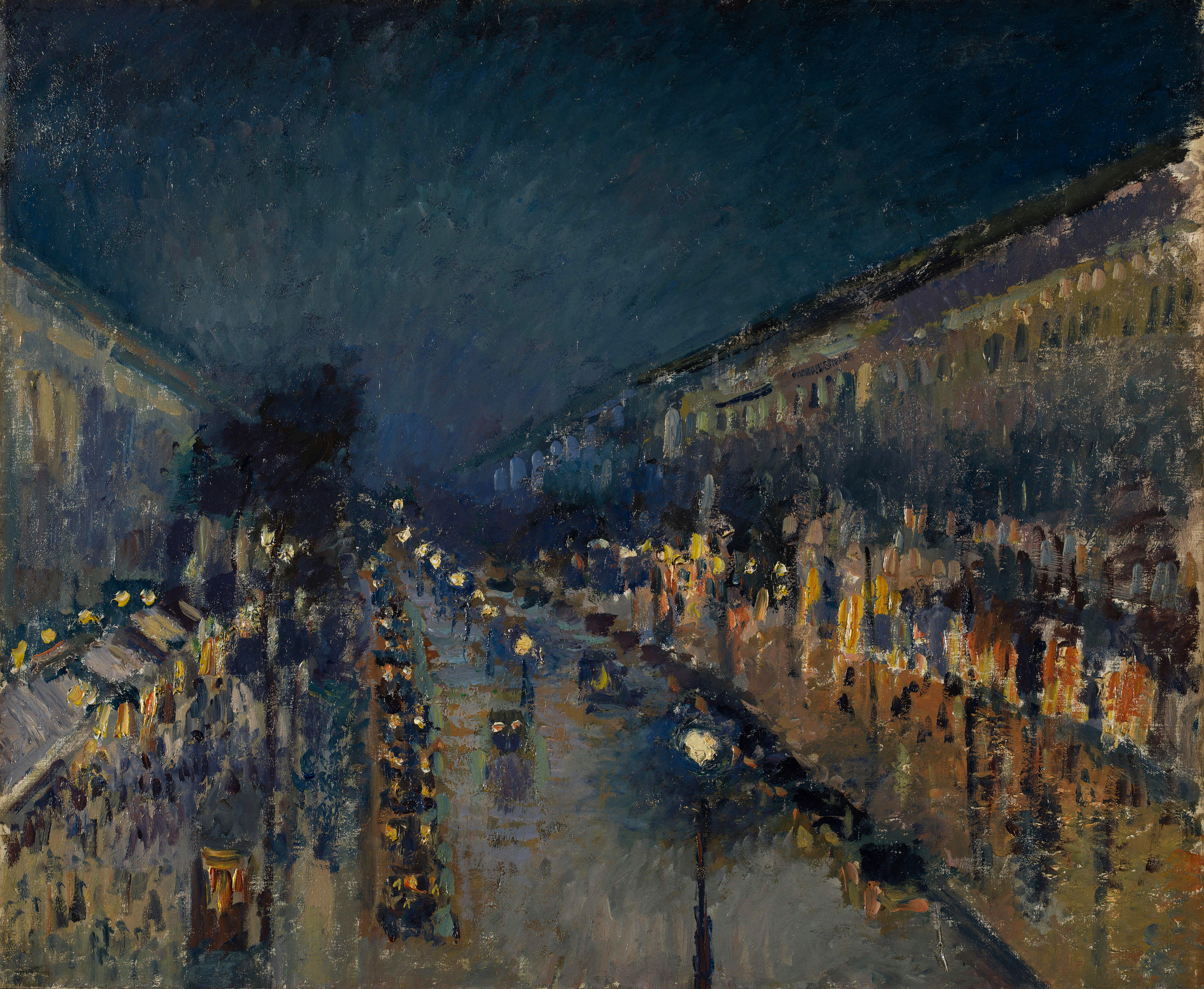
The Boulevard Montmartre at Night, 1897. National Gallery

== See also ==
- List of paintings by Camille Pissarro
- The history behind the Boulevard Montmartre.
- Le Boulevard de Montmartre, matinée de printemps (1897 Pissarro painting)

== Bibliography ==
- Brodskaïa, Nathalia. “Camille Pissarro” in Impressionism. New York: Parkstone Press International, 2010.
- Cogniat, Raymond. Pissarro. New York: Crown Publishing Inc., 1975.
- Courthion, Pierre. Impressionism: The Movement, The Masters, The Precursors and The Followers. New York: Harry N. Abrams, Inc., 1977.
- Gerstein, Marc S. Camille Pissarro” on Impressionism: Selections From Five American Museums. New York: Hudson Hills Press, 1989.
- Lloyd, Christopher. Camille Pissarro. New York: Rizzoli, 1981.
