= Boulevard Montmartre =

Street in Paris, France

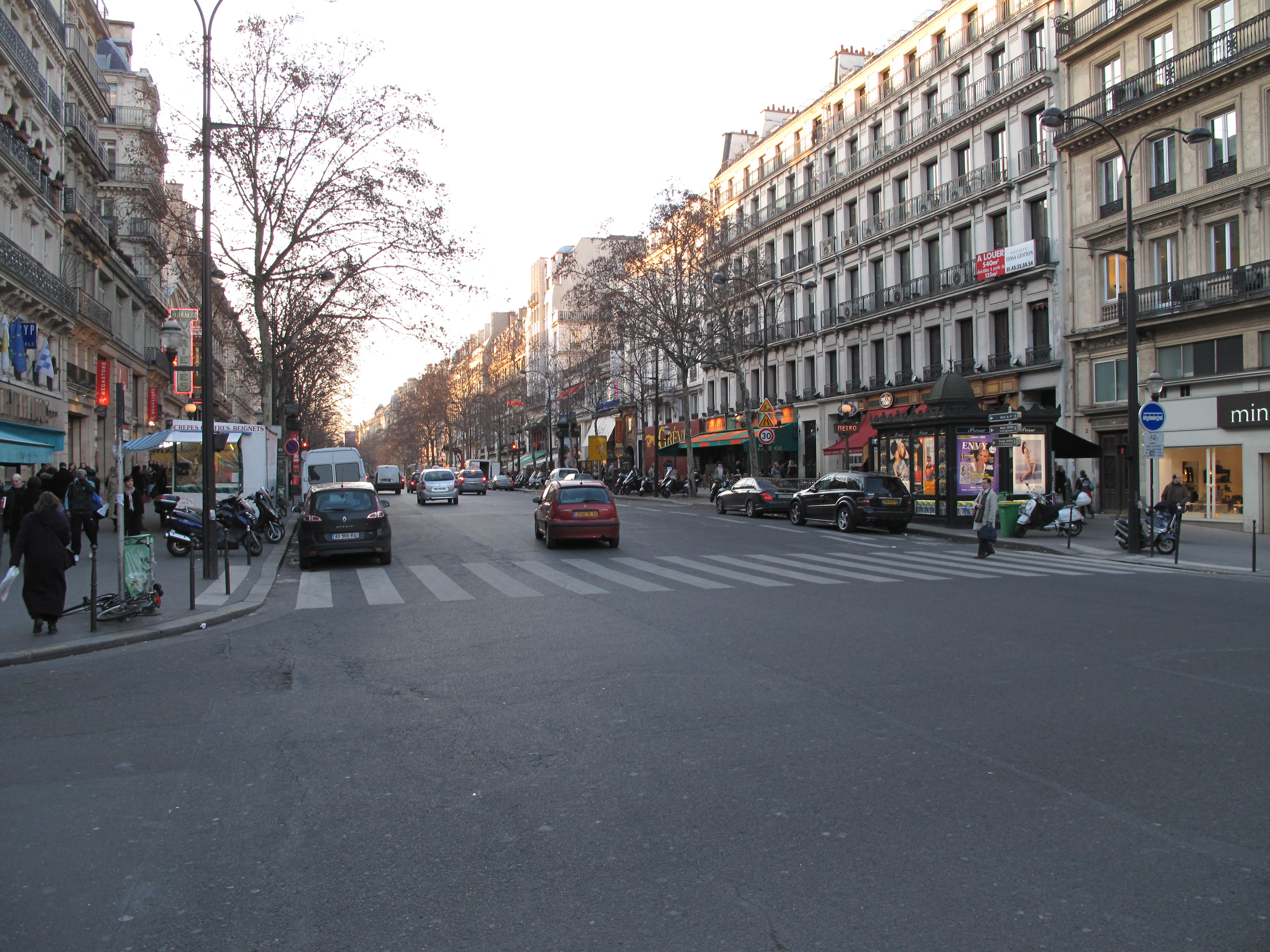
- Boulevard Montmartre in February 2010

- Location within Paris
- Length: 215 m (705 ft)
- Width: 35 m (115 ft)
- Arrondissement: 2nd, 9th
- Quarter: Vivienne Faubourg Montmartre
- Coordinates: 48°52′18″N 2°20′29″E
- From: Rue Montmartre, Rue du Faubourg Montmartre
- To: Rue de Richelieu, Rue Drouot

Construction
- Completion: Lettres patentes de juillet 1676.

The Boulevard Montmartre (French pronunciation: [bulvaʁ mɔ̃maʁtʁ]) is one of the four grands boulevards of Paris. It was constructed in 1763. Contrary to what its name may suggest, the road is not situated on the hills of Montmartre. It is the easternmost of the grands boulevards.

== History ==
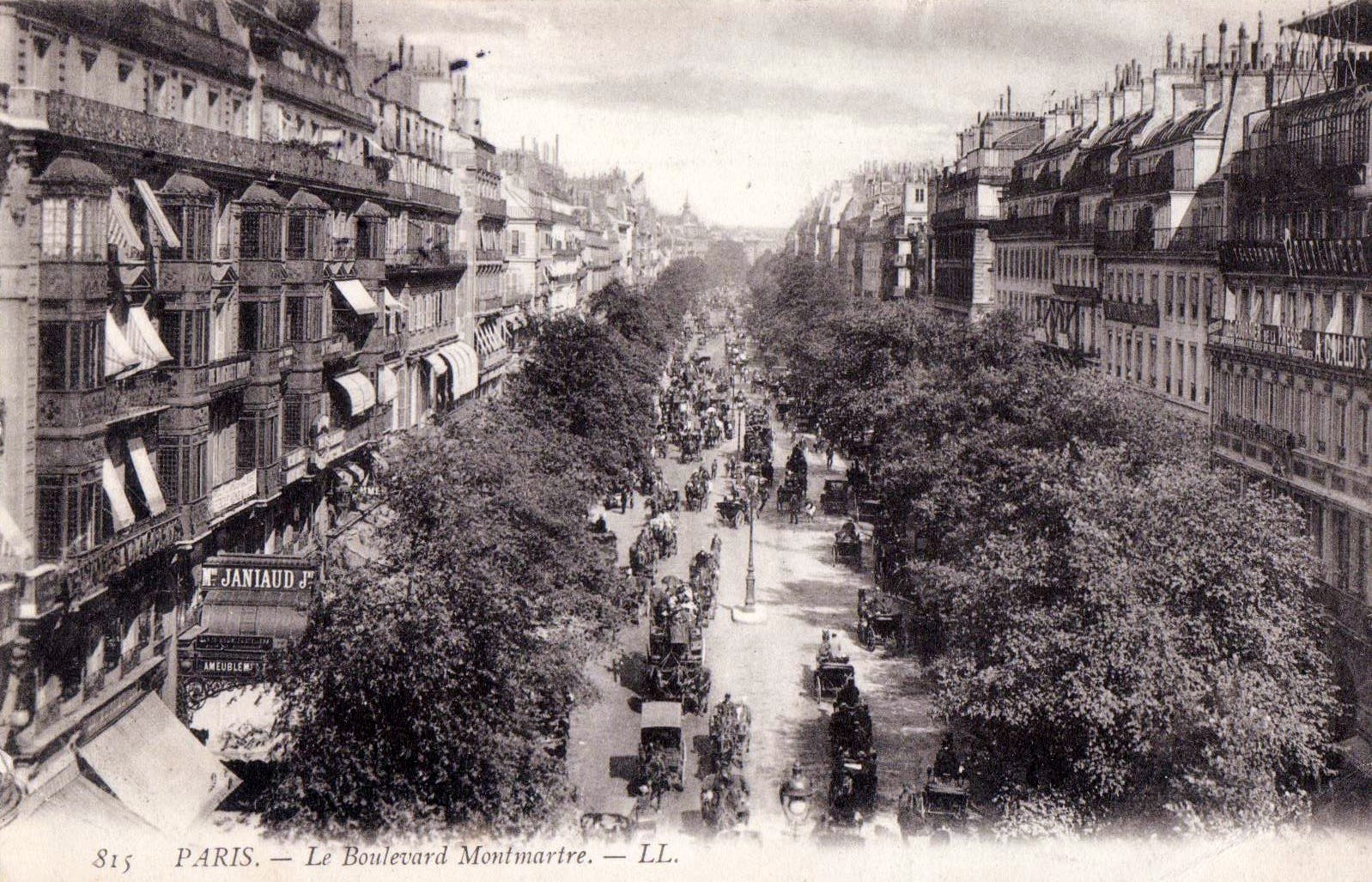
Boulevard Montmartre, 1906

In 1851, as part of its publicity, an auction of a gold ingot to finance the expatriation of 3,300 would-be gold prospectors to San Francisco was held. The ingot, valued at 400,000 francs, was exhibited on the boulevard.

== Location ==
Contrary to what its name may suggest, the road is not situated on the hills of Montmartre but is the easterly extension of the Boulevard Haussmann and the Boulevard des Italiens at their junction with Rue de Richelieu. Boulevard Montmartre marks the border between the 2nd and 9th arrondissements.

Located near the Metro stations: Richelieu–Drouot and Grands Boulevards.

== See also ==
- Boulevard Montmartre: Mardi Gras (1897 painting)
- Le Boulevard de Montmartre, Matinée de Printemps (1897 painting)
- Murder of Jean Jaurès

== Sources ==
- This page is a translation of its French equivalent.

=== Bibliography ===
- Danielle Chadych et Dominique Leborgne, Atlas de Paris, Parigramme, 2002 (ISBN 2-84096-249-7).
