= Le Boulevard de Montmartre, matinée de printemps =

Painting by Camille Pissarro

Boulevard Montmartre, Spring
- Le Boulevard de Montmartre, matinée de printemps (French)
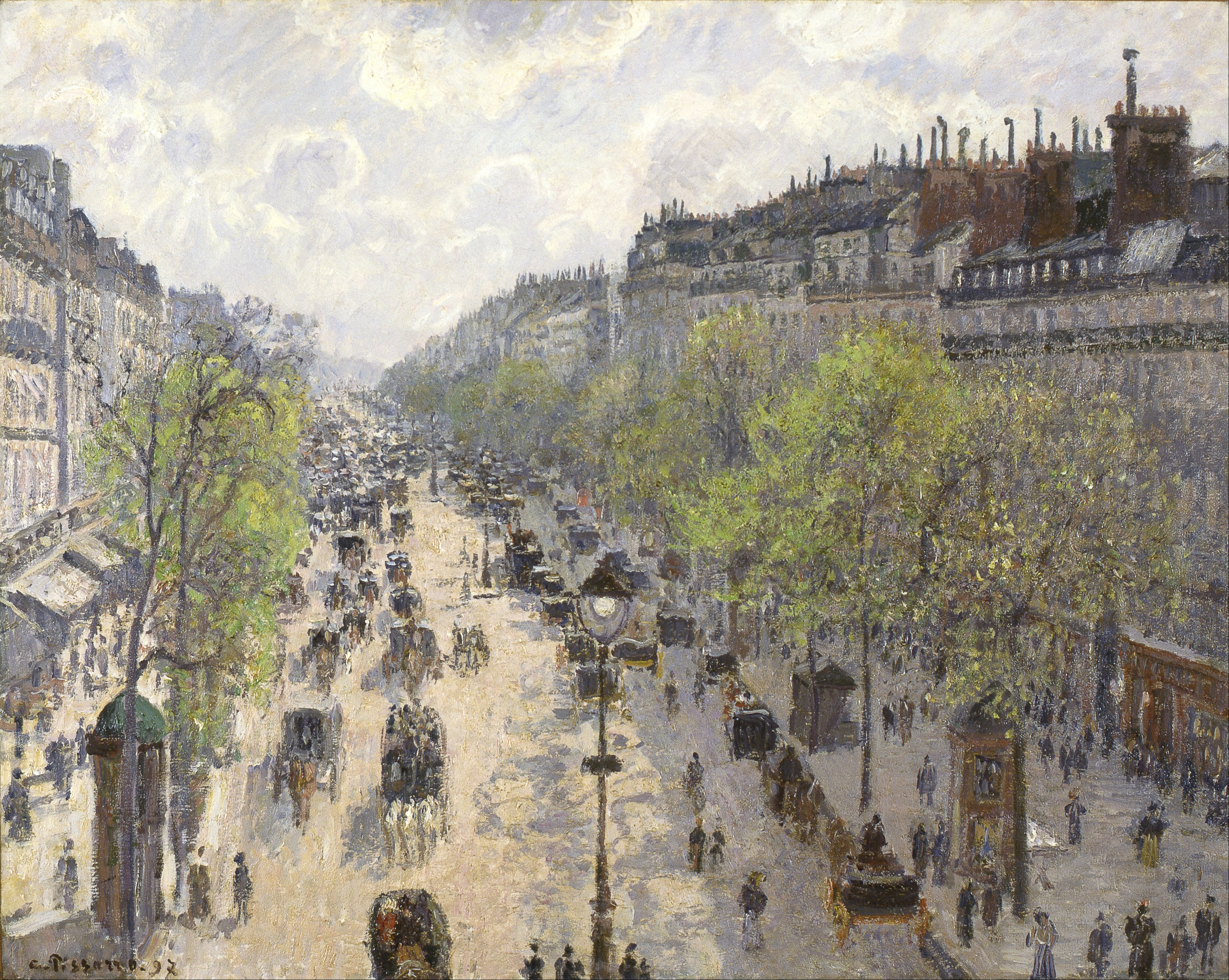
- Artist: Camille Pissarro
- Year: 1897
- Catalogue: JP and CD-RS 1171
- Medium: Oil on canvas
- Dimensions: 65 cm × 81 cm (26 in × 32 in)
- Location: Private collection

Le Boulevard de Montmartre, matinée de printemps (English: Boulevard Montmartre, Spring) is an 1897 oil on canvas painting of Paris' Boulevard Montmartre by Camille Pissarro. The work is part of a series of 14 paintings from the same year depicting Pissarro's view of the boulevard from his room at the Grand Hôtel de Russie. A nearly identical work with the same title is in the collection of the Museum Langmatt.

On 5 February 2014 it was auctioned at Sotheby's, London for £19,682,500, (Note: Hammer price with buyer's premium) double its pre-sale estimate.

== Provenance ==
- Galerie Durand-Ruel, Paris (acquired from the artist on 2 June 1898)
- Mr Burke, London (acquired from the above on 11 January 1899)
- Arthur Tooth & Sons, London
- Galerie Durand-Ruel, Paris (acquired from the above on 14 August 1901)
- Paul Cassirer, Berlin (acquired from the above on 13 October 1902)
- Adolf Rothermundt, Dresden (acquired circa 1914)
- Max Silberberg, Breslau (acquired by 1923)
- Sale: Paul Graupe, Berlin, 23 March 1935, lot 27 (forced sale by Max Silberberg)
- Alfred & Marie Erlich, New York
- Nathan J. & Sara N. Cohn, Mount Vernon (acquired from the above)
- Knoedler & Co., New York (acquired from the above on 9 November 1959)
- John & Frances L. Loeb, New York (acquired from the above on 4 January 1960)
- The American Friends of The Israel Museum, Jerusalem (a bequest from the above in 1997)
- The Israel Museum, Jerusalem (a gift from the above in 1997)
- Restituted to Gerta Silberberg on 1 February 2000, and placed on loan with the Israel Museum until 2013

== Exhibition history ==
- Paris, Galerie Durand-Ruel, Œuvres récentes de Camille Pissarro, 1898, no. 24
- St. Petersburg, Société Impériale d’Encouragement des Arts, Expositions française des Beaux-Arts et des Arts décoratifs, 1899, no. 274
- Rheims, Société des Amis des Arts, 16e Exposition générale, 1901, no. 563
- Dresden, Galerie Ernst Arnold, Ausstellung von Gemälden französischer Künstler, 1902, no. 26
- Dresden, Galerie Ernst Arnold, Französische Malerei des XIX. Jahrhunderts, 1914, no. 79
- New York, Wildenstein & Co., C. Pissarro, 1965, no. 66
- New York, Wildenstein & Co., ‘One Hundred Years of Impressionism’: A Tribute to Durand-Ruel, 1970, no. 88, illustrated in the catalogue
- Dallas, Dallas Museum of Art; Philadelphia, Philadelphia Museum of Art & London, Royal Academy of Arts, The Impressionist and the City: Pissarro’s Series Paintings, 1992–93, no. 51, illustrated in colour in the catalogue
- Rovereto, Museo d'Arte Moderna e Contemporanea di Trento e Rovereto, Impressionists and Post-Impressionists: Masterpieces from the Israel Museum of Jerusalem, 2008–09, no. 6

== Other works in the series ==
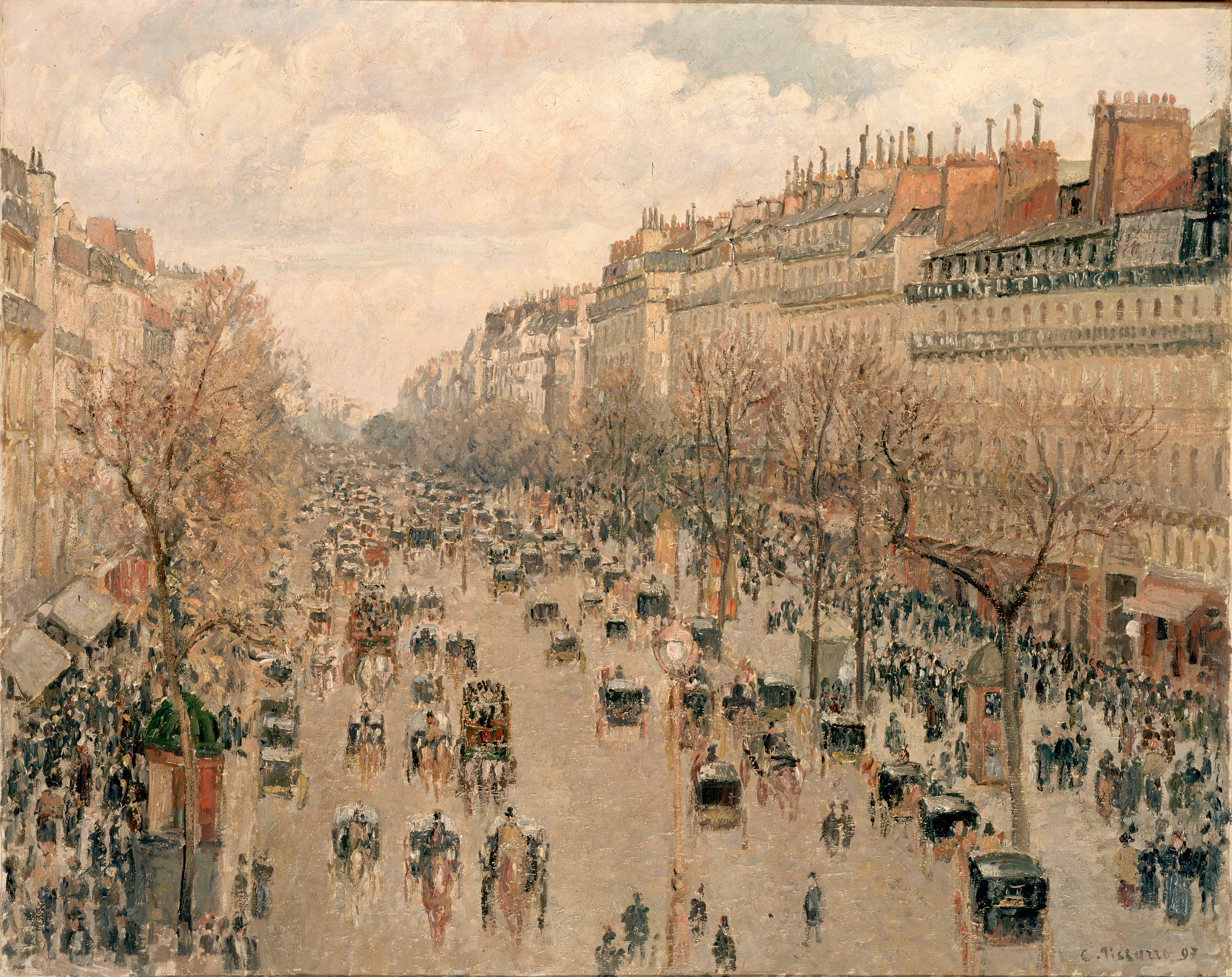
Boulevard Montmartre à Paris, 1897. Hermitage Museum

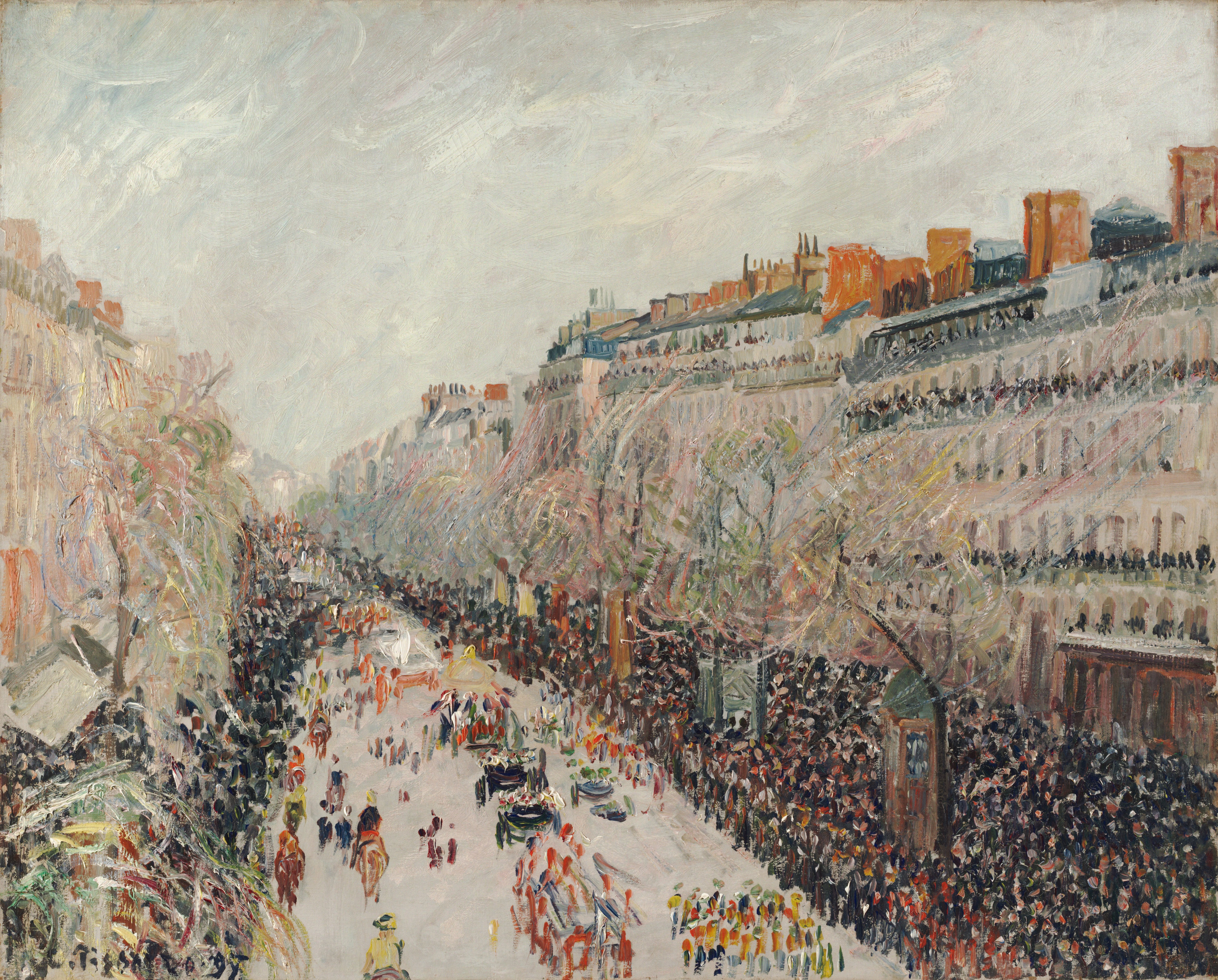
Mardi Gras on the Boulevards, 1897. Fogg Museum

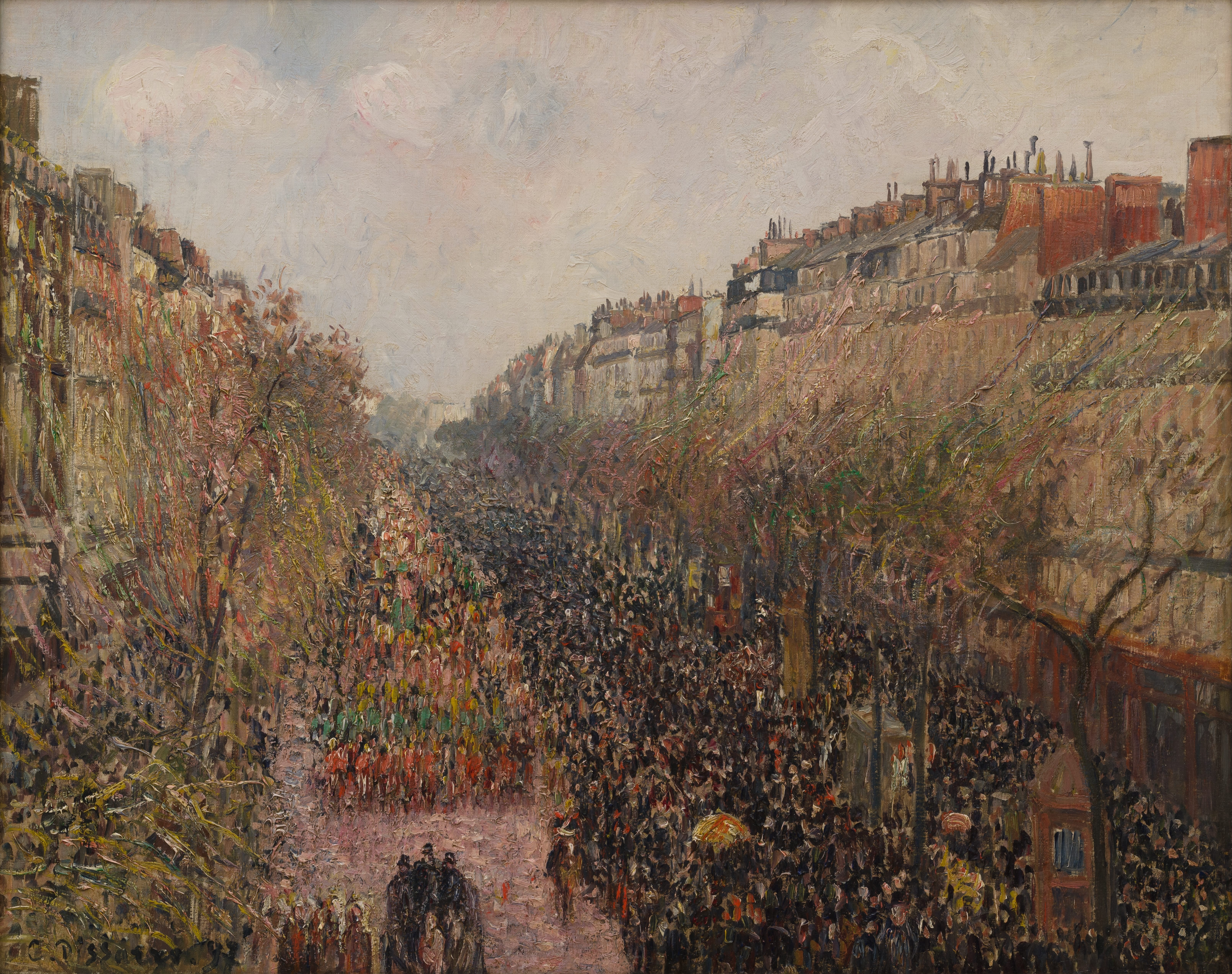
Boulevard Montmartre, Mardi Gras, 1897. Hammer Museum

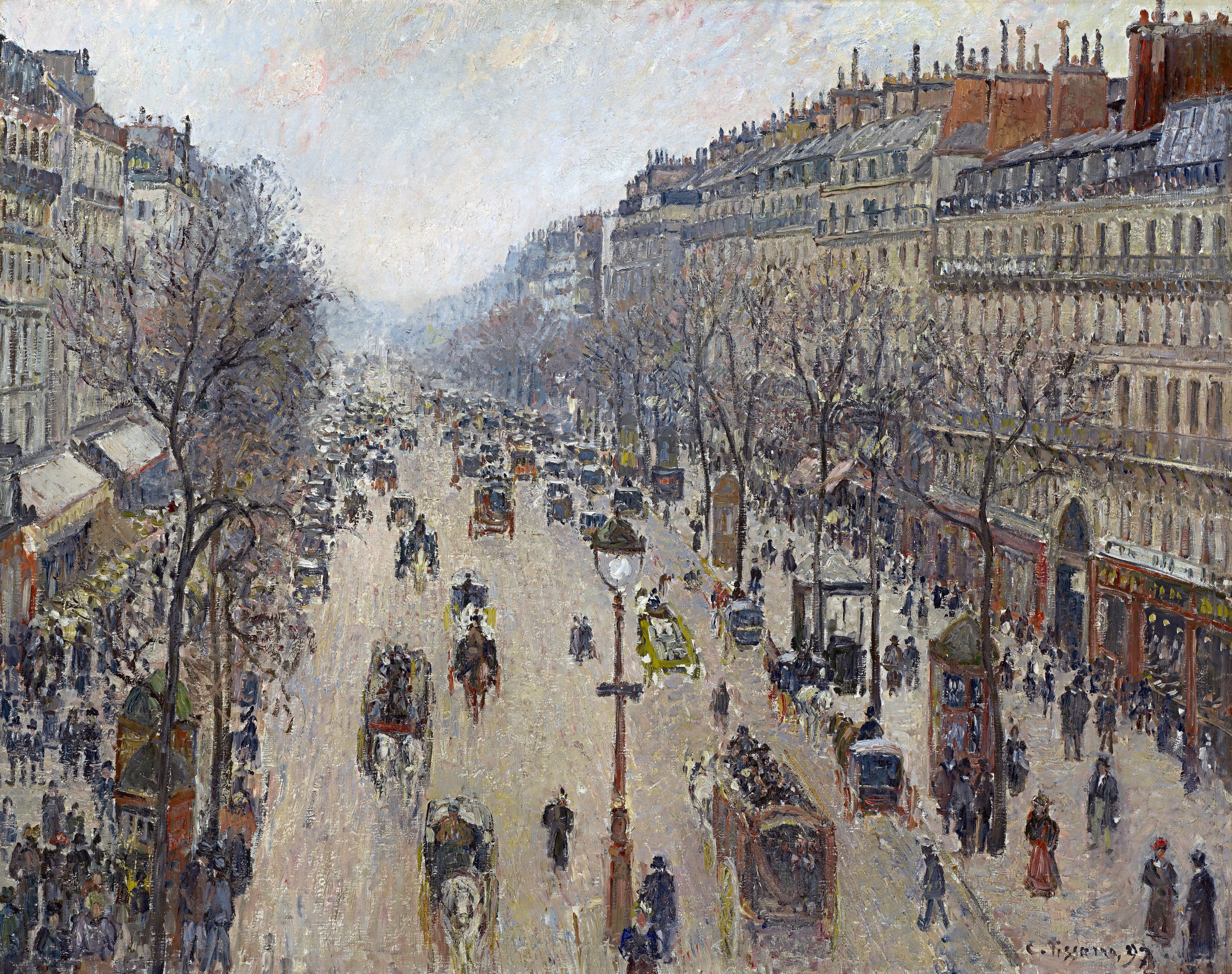
Boulevard Montmartre, morning, cloudy weather, 1897. National Gallery of Victoria

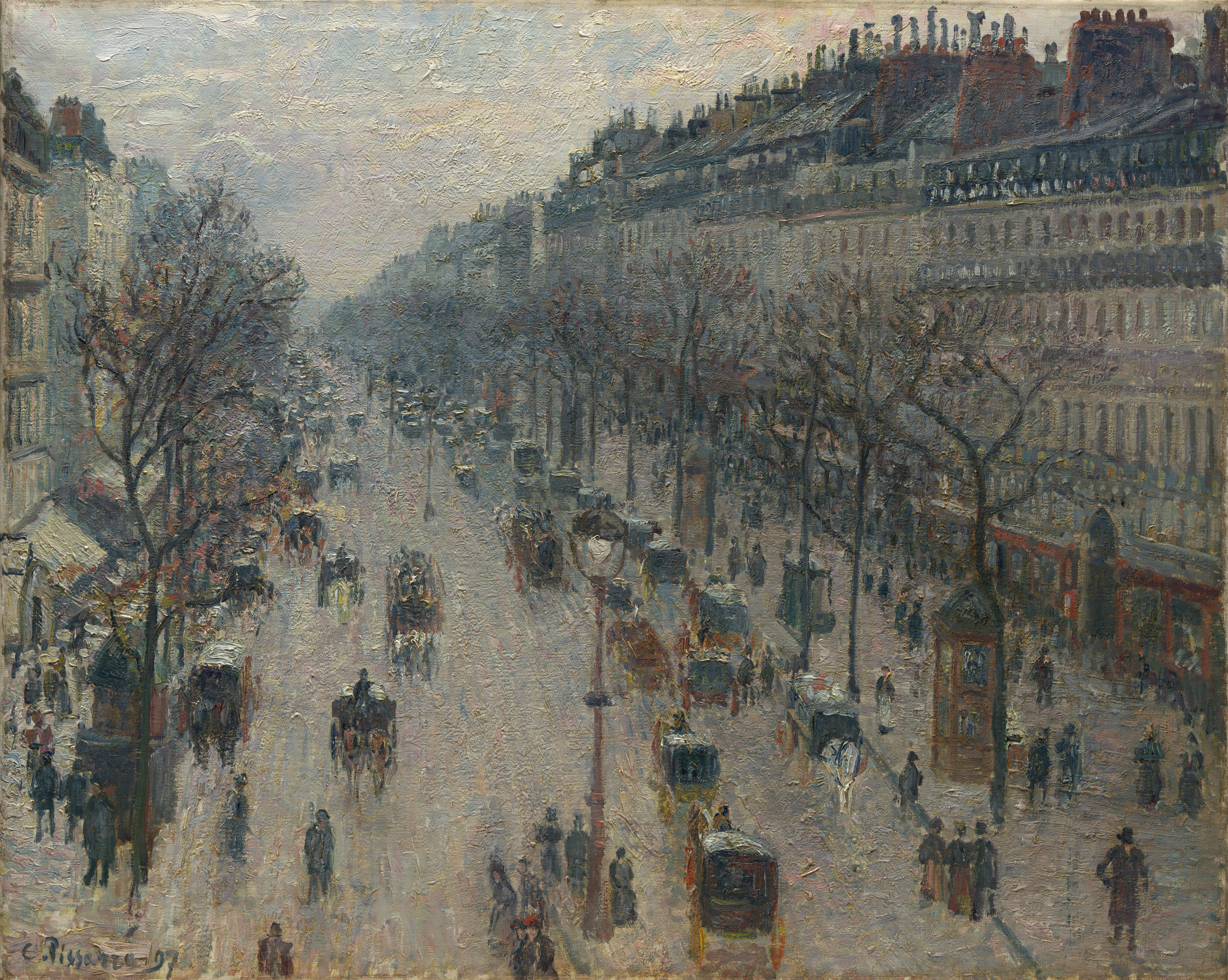
The Boulevard Montmartre on a Winter Morning, 1897. Metropolitan Museum of Art

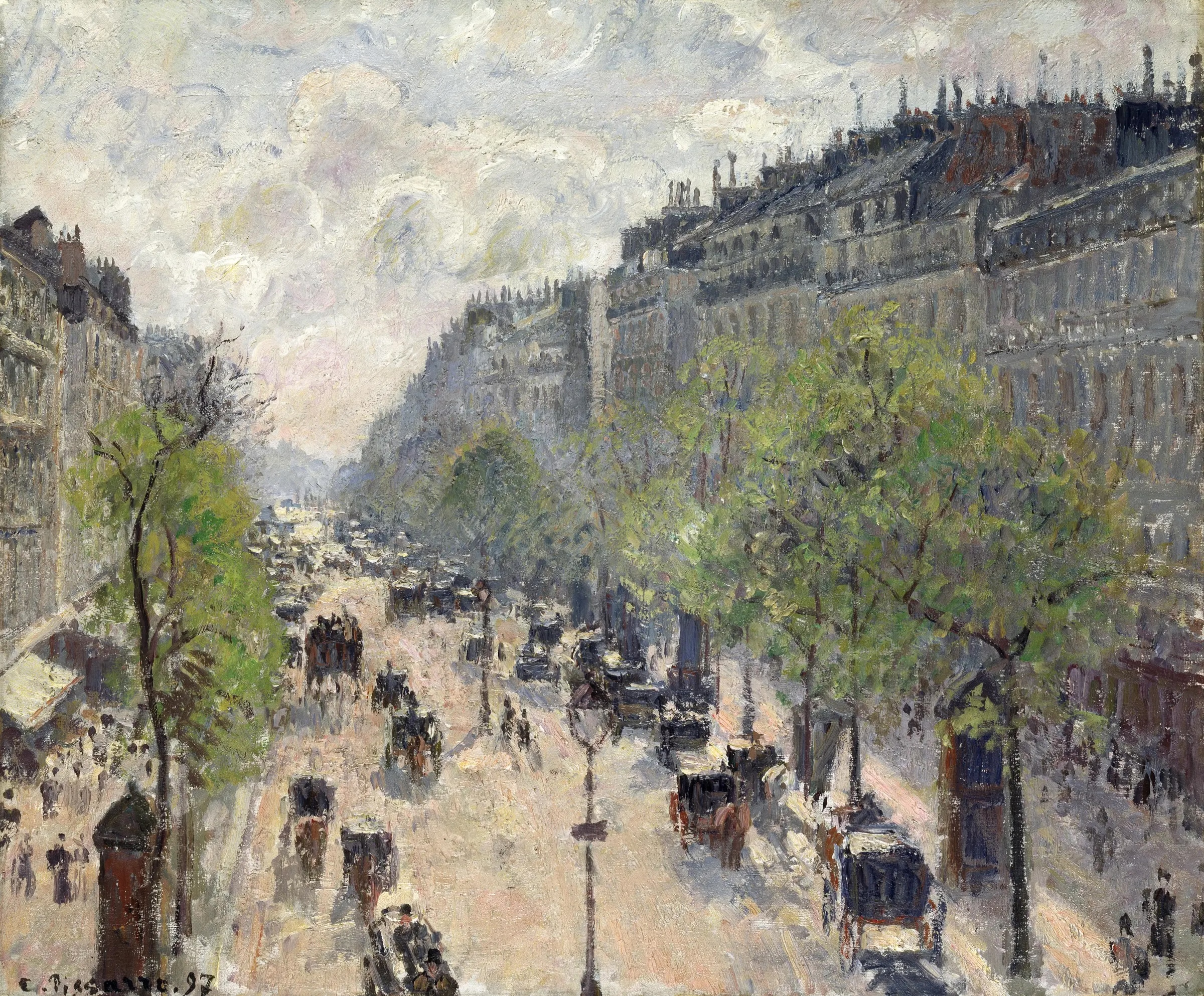
Boulevard Montmartre, Spring, 1897. Museum Langmatt

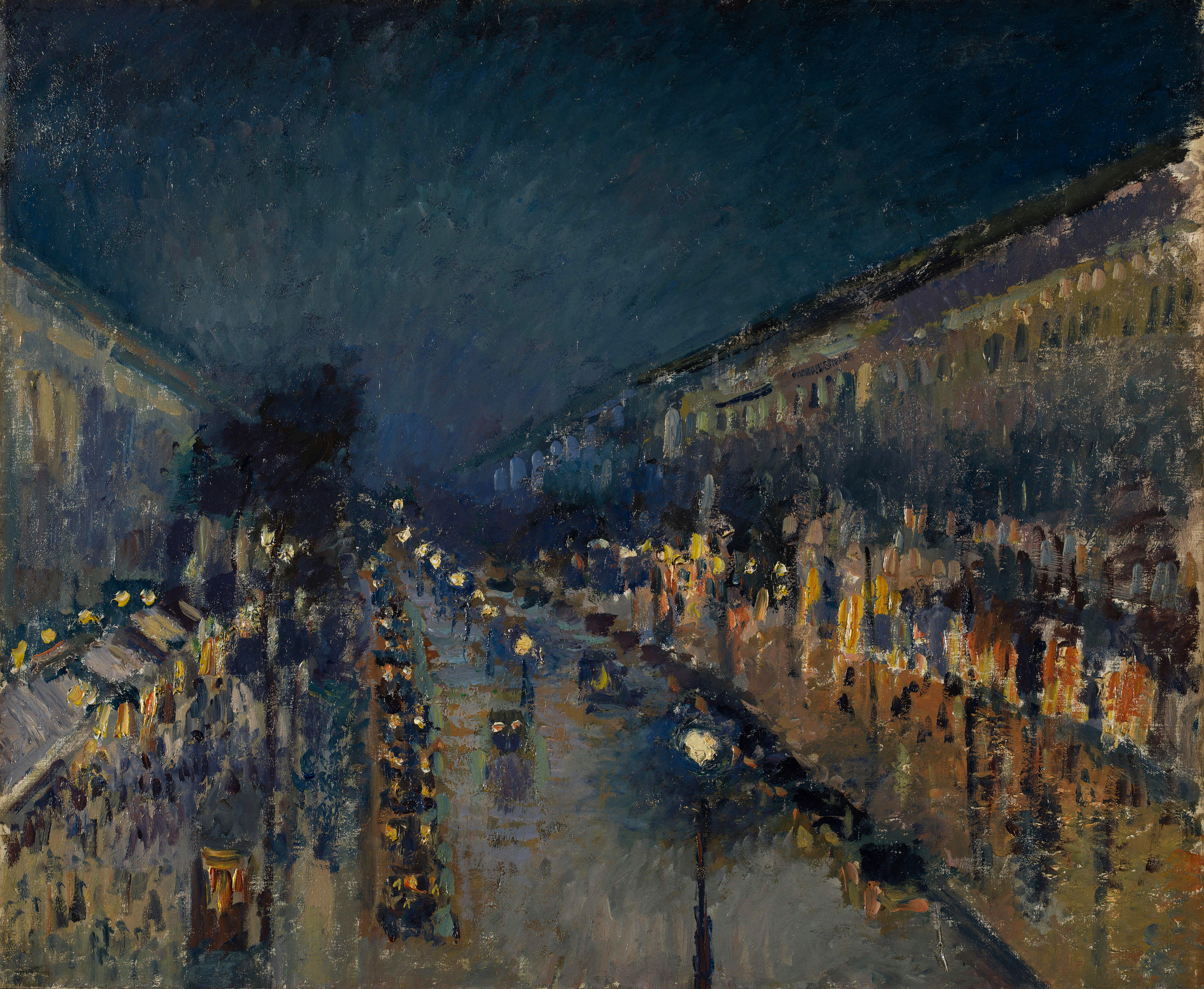
The Boulevard Montmartre at Night, 1897. National Gallery

== See also ==
- List of paintings by Camille Pissarro
- Boulevard Montmartre, Mardi Gras
- Holocaust in Germany

== Bibliography ==
- Mauclair, Camille. The French Impressionists, London & New York, 1903, illustrated p. 2.
- Pissarro, Joachim and Snollaerts, Claire Durand-Ruel. Pissarro, Critical Catalogue of Paintings, Paris, 2005, vol. III, no. 1171, illustrated in colour p. 736.
- Scheffler, Karl. Die Sammlung Max Silberberg, in Kunst und Künstler, October 1931, mentioned p. 12.
