= Paris Carnival =

Annual festival in Paris, France

Carnival of Paris Carnaval de Paris
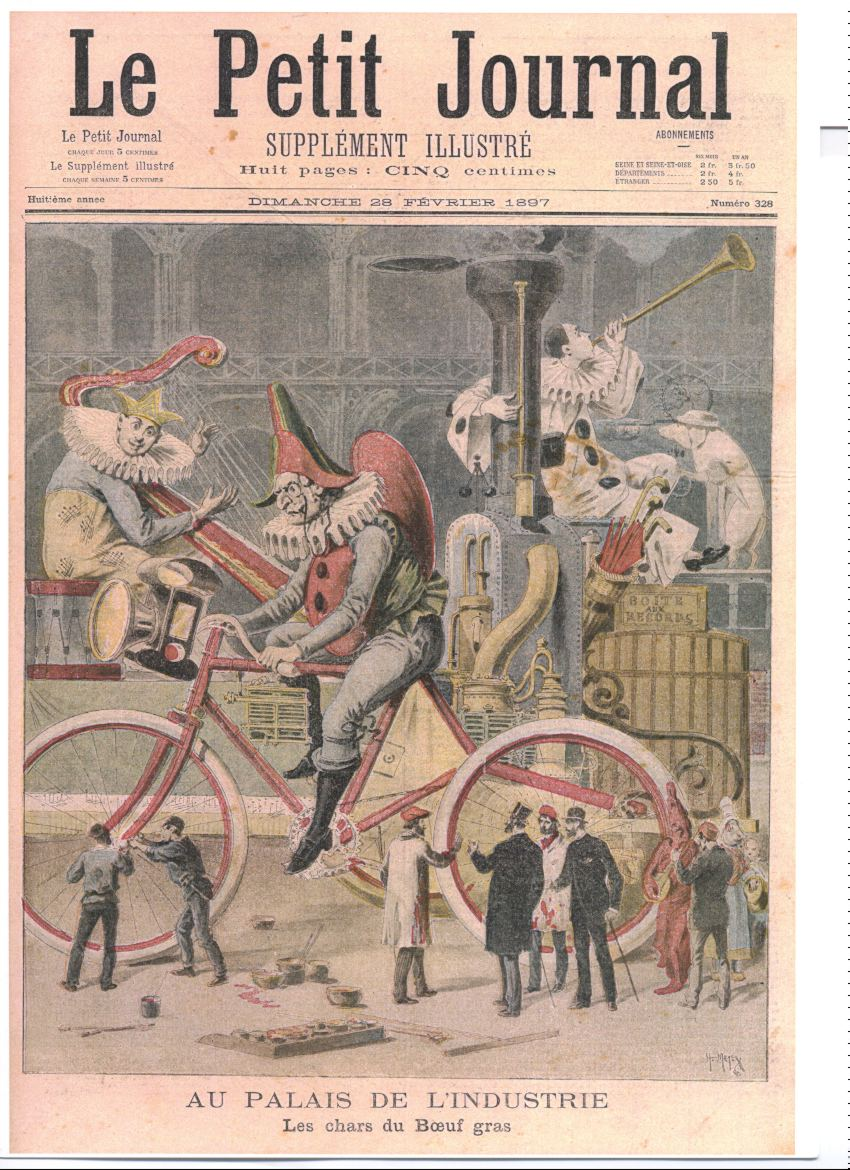
- The giant clown of the Paris Carnival, 1897
- Status: Active
- Genre: Carnival
- Frequency: Annual
- Location: Paris
- Country: France

The Paris Carnival (French: Carnaval de Paris) is an annual festival held in Paris, France. The carnival occurs after the Feast of Fools and has been held since the 16th century or earlier, with a long 20th century interregnum.

== History ==
The Carnival of Paris is a festival with a very long history in the French capital. Nicolas de Baye wrote in his journal in 1411:

"Monday, the 22nd of February, the royal household, in order to observe the Lenten feast, will be rising before dawn [to prepare]".

The staying-power of the Carnival of Paris, the elements that have made it an institution for centuries, is based on an unbroken tradition of "festive and carnival societies" (similar to the samba schools in Rio de Janeiro, the mystic societies in Mobile or the krewes of the New Orleans Mardi Gras) and the organized involvement of certain civic groups, corporations, and trade unions. The central role of the working class is illustrated, for example, by an anonymous poem of the eighteenth century:

Always at these kinds of masquerades,
Workers take their special pleasures.
They wail, "We must watch our parades!
This is something we've all treasured!"
Tomorrow we'll return to the usual grind,
When Mardi Gras is, sadly, over,
Food and drink will be hard to find
And we'll do our best to recover.

Workers have always played a central role in the celebrations. What is less known is the fact that the Carnaval de Paris is also, traditionally, the feast of the Paris police. During the nineteenth century, the involvement of butchers, launderers, traders, and students became essential to the liveliness of the Carnival. The variety, the multi-class composition, of the participants is found in carnivals throughout the world. Whether in Dunkirk or Brazil, tradition, organization, and the involvement of diverse segments of the population are essential for the well-being of the party.

Édouard Manet, Bal masqué à l'opéra, 1873

Until the early-twentieth century, the Paris Carnival lasted much longer than just the one day, Tuesday of Mardi Gras. In 1690, in his Dictionary, Antoine Furetière wrote these words, which apply also to Paris:

"CARNIVAL, masculine noun: time of rejoicing lasting from Epiphany until Lent. Dances, feasts, and marriages are mainly held at Carnival time."

Sixty-two years later, in 1752, the Encyclopedia of Denis Diderot and Jean le Rond d'Alembert confirmed this impression with almost the same words Furetière used. (In fact, so close is the correspondence that, it seems, Furetière might have been Diderot’s source.):

"The carnival begins the day after Epiphany, or the 7th of January, and lasts until Lent. Dances, feasts, and marriages are mainly held during carnival."

However, the Carnaval de Paris has also endured a hiatus; it was interrupted between 1952 and 1997. Even today, many Parisians do not know that the carnival exists. They are also ignorant of the fact that central to the carnival celebration is the appearance of certain traditional characters, stereotypes with distinctive costumes who appear every year, and that there are a number of traditional carnival jokes. These truly "old jokes" have survived from as long ago as the seventeenth century. During the hiatus the words "Carnaval de Paris" were seldom spoken. Parisians were always able to celebrate "Mardi Gras", of course; they simply had to travel to Nice or Rio de Janeiro.

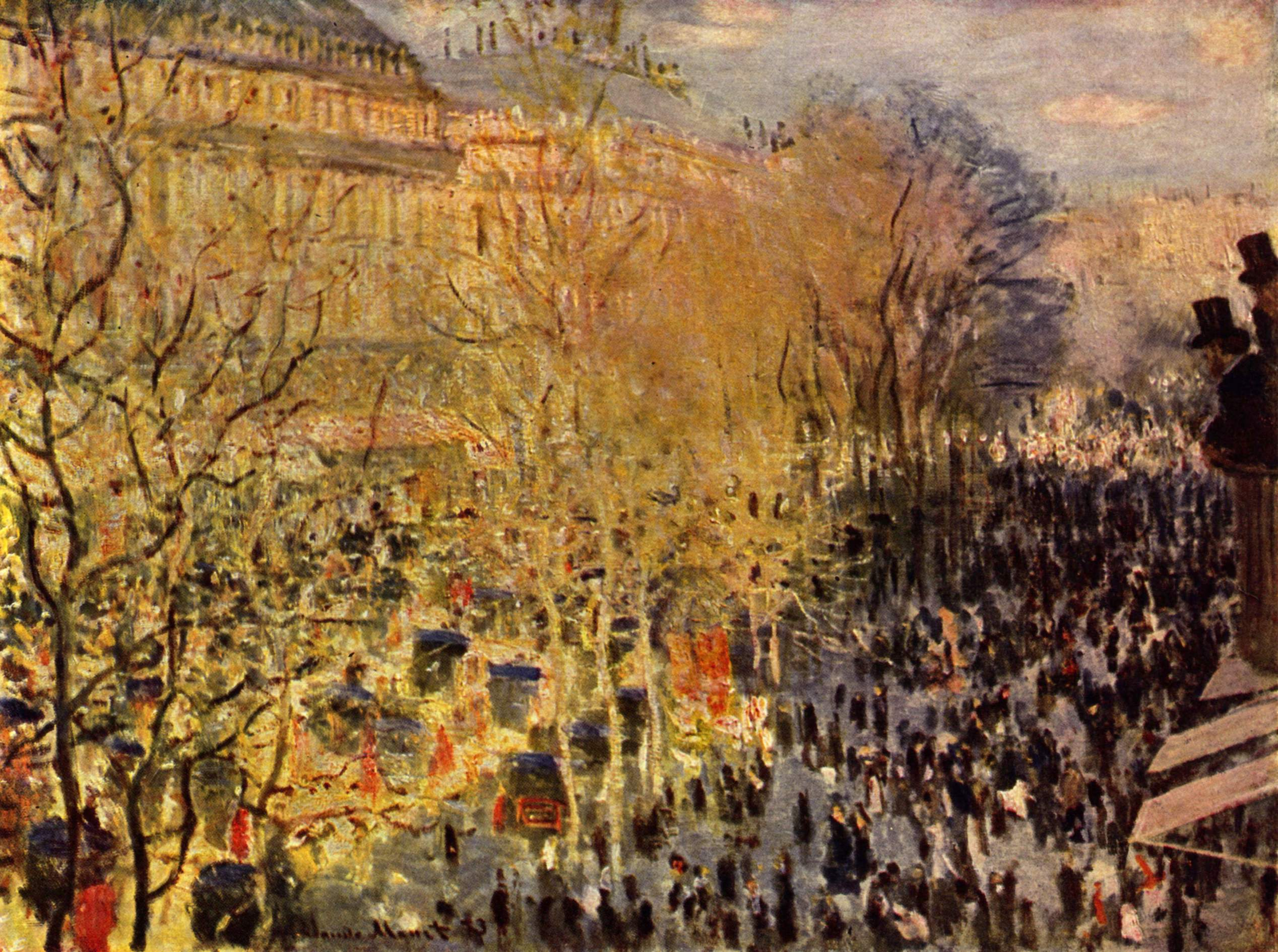
Claude Monet, Carnaval boulevard des Capucines, 1873

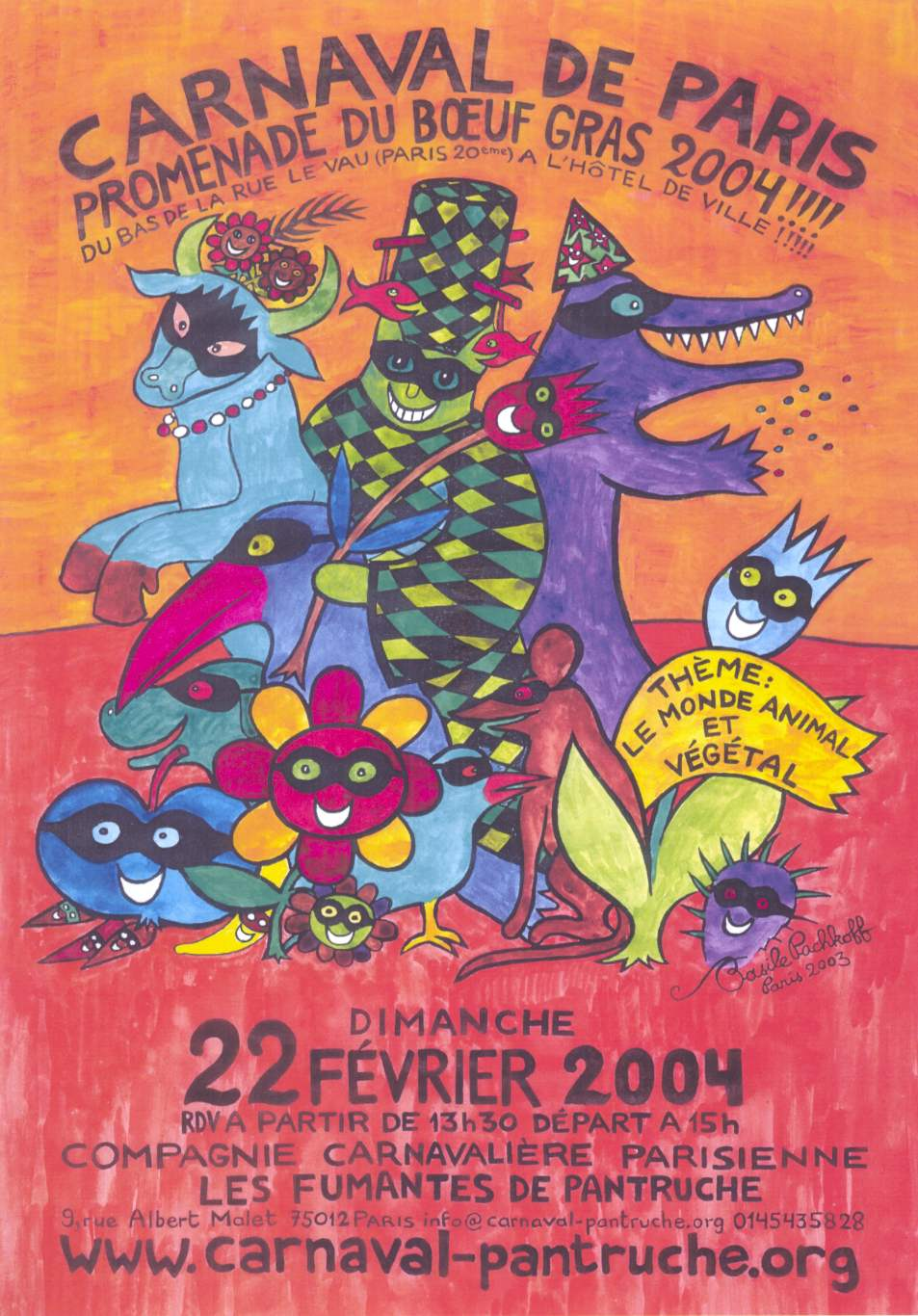
A modern carnival poster made by Basile Pachkoff

The Carnaval de Paris has inspired great artists. The picture reproduced above was painted by Édouard Manet. It represents the famous masked ball at the Paris opera, which is held during the Carnival. The picture on the right is by Claude Monet, and it shows the Boulevard des Capucines where the processions take place.

== Street activities ==
At street level, two types of event are traditionally part of the Carnival de Paris: the walk of masks, and the processions.

The walk of masks involves people in disguise in huge numbers, and the curious come to see them, at a given location at a given time. Here's what Dulaure says of this phenomenon in 1787 :

"Rue Saint-Antoine is famous for the prodigious contest of masks held every year on the last day of the carnival, which attracts a large number of the curious."

Other traditional events of the carnival are the parades and processions:

- The fat days occurred during "the last days of carnival", according to Dulaure. The "fat days" started during the eighteenth century, when they began on Thursday and ended five days later, on Mardi Gras. In the nineteenth century, they were restricted to Sunday, Monday, and Mardi Gras (Tuesday) only. They end when the Promenade du Boeuf Gras (Procession of the Fat Ox) begins.
- Twenty-one days after Mardi Gras is the Thursday of Mid-Lent (Mi-Carême). Mid-Lent is also called the Feast of Laundresses, for it is the feast day of their parade, and of their queens, and of the Queen of Laundresses. They inspired, during the last years of the nineteenth century, other guilds and unions to elect their own queens. Also known as the ‘’Vachalcade’’. Originally intended to be an annual event, it only lasted two seasons.

== Modern day carnival ==
In 1997 the carnival was restarted by the Les Fumantes de Pantruches and Droit à la Culture groups. They are still quite active and hold several events each year - Carnaval de Paris and the Carnaval des Femmes de Paris, of which the poster on this page is an example.

Since 2002 a Carnaval has also been run by MACAQ - the Movement for the Cultural and Artistic Liveliness of the Quarter. There were around 1500 participants in 2007, with 10,000 spectators, which grew to 15,000 participants and 40,000 spectators in 2009, according to the organizers. In 2010 the carnival coincided with Valentine's Day and Chinese New Year, the theme was improbable couples. It set off from Place Gambetta and went via Belleville, where it met the Chinese New Year parade, to République, before arriving at the Hôtel de Ville.
