= National Gallery of Victoria =

Art museum in Melbourne, Australia

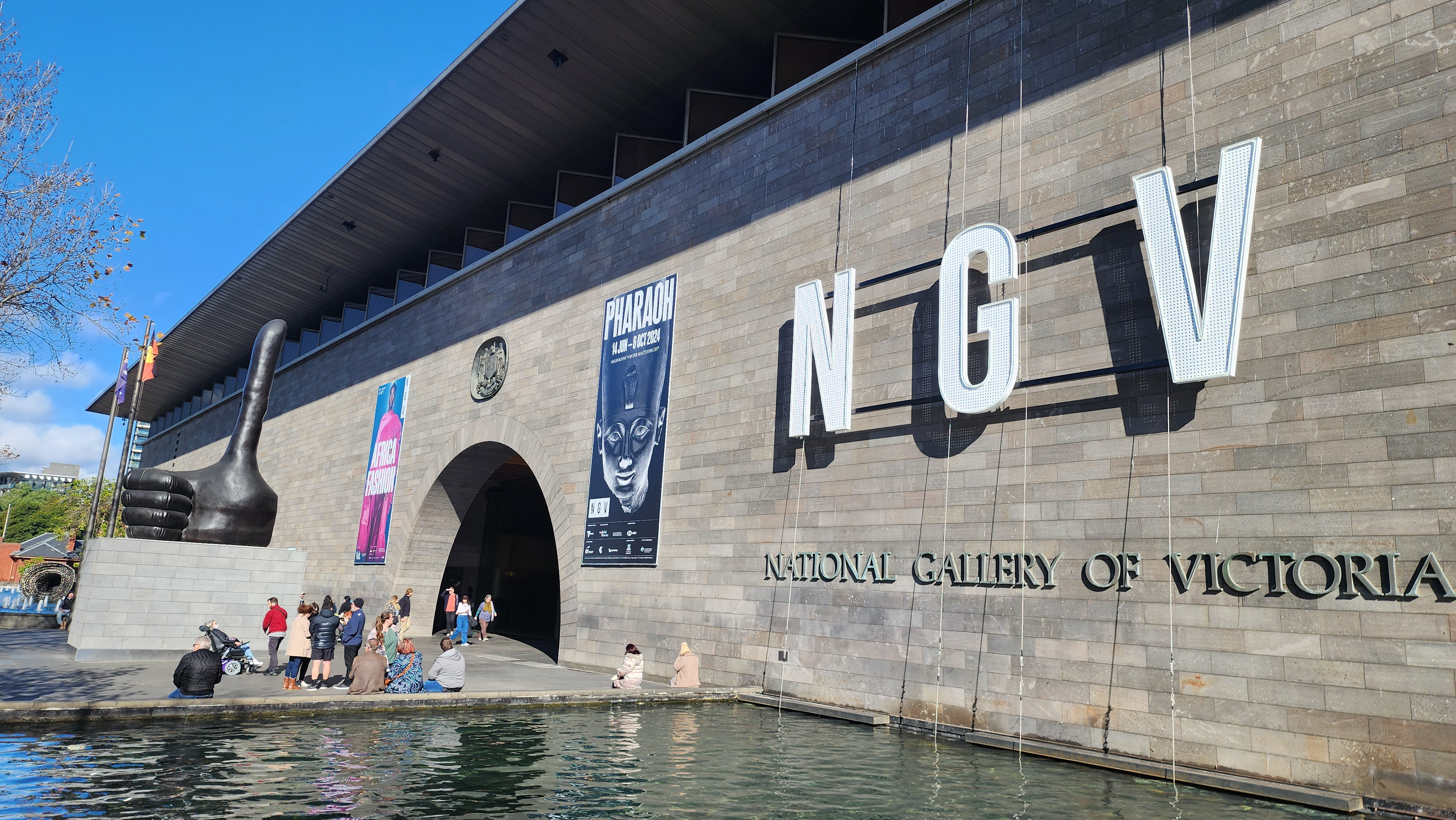
- NGV International on St Kilda Road in Southbank
- Established: 24 May 1861; 165 years ago
- Location: Southbank, Victoria, Australia
- Coordinates: 37°49′21″S 144°58′08″E
- Type: Art museum
- Visitors: 3,210,000 (2017–18)
- Director: Tony Ellwood
- Public transit access: Flinders Street station Tram routes 1, 3, 5, 6, 16, 64, 67, 72
- Website: ngv.vic.gov.au

Victorian Heritage Register
- Official name: National Gallery of Victoria
- Type: State Registered Place
- Criteria: a, d, e, g, h
- Designated: August 20, 1982
- Reference no.: H1499
- Heritage Overlay number: HO792

The National Gallery of Victoria, popularly known as the NGV, is an art museum in Melbourne, Victoria, Australia. Founded in 1861, it is Australia's oldest and most visited art museum.

With over 76,000 works in its collection, the NGV has the second largest art collection of any Australian gallery. The NGV houses its collection across two sites: NGV International, located on St Kilda Road in the Melbourne Arts Precinct of Southbank, and the Ian Potter Centre: NGV Australia, located nearby at Federation Square. The NGV International building, designed by Sir Roy Grounds, opened in 1968, and was redeveloped by Mario Bellini before reopening in 2003. It houses the gallery's international art collection and is on the Victorian Heritage Register. The Ian Potter Centre: NGV Australia, designed by Lab Architecture Studio, opened in 2002 and houses the gallery's Australian art collection.

A third site, The Fox: NGV Contemporary, is planned to open in the Melbourne Arts Precinct in 2028, and will be Australia's largest contemporary art gallery.

== History ==
=== 19th century ===
Nicholas Chevalier's unrealised 1860 vision for the National Gallery next to the State Library building

In 1850, the Port Phillip District of New South Wales was granted separation, officially becoming the colony of Victoria on 1 July 1851. In the wake of a gold rush the following month, Victoria emerged as Australia's richest colony, and Melbourne, its capital, Australia's largest and wealthiest city. With Melbourne's rapid growth came calls for the establishment of a public art gallery, and in 1859, the Government of Victoria pledged £2000 for the acquisition of plaster casts of sculpture. These works were displayed in the Museum of Art, opened by Governor Sir Henry Barkly in May 1861 on the lower floor of the south wing of the public Library (now the State Library of Victoria) on Swanston Street. Further money was set aside in the early 1860s for the purchase of original paintings by British and Victorian artists. These works were first displayed in December 1864 in the newly opened Picture Gallery, which remained under the curatorial administration of the Public Library until 1882. Grand designs for a building fronting Lonsdale and Swanston streets were drawn by Nicholas Chevalier in 1860 and Frederick Grosse in 1865, featuring an enormous and elaborate library and gallery, but these visions were never realised.

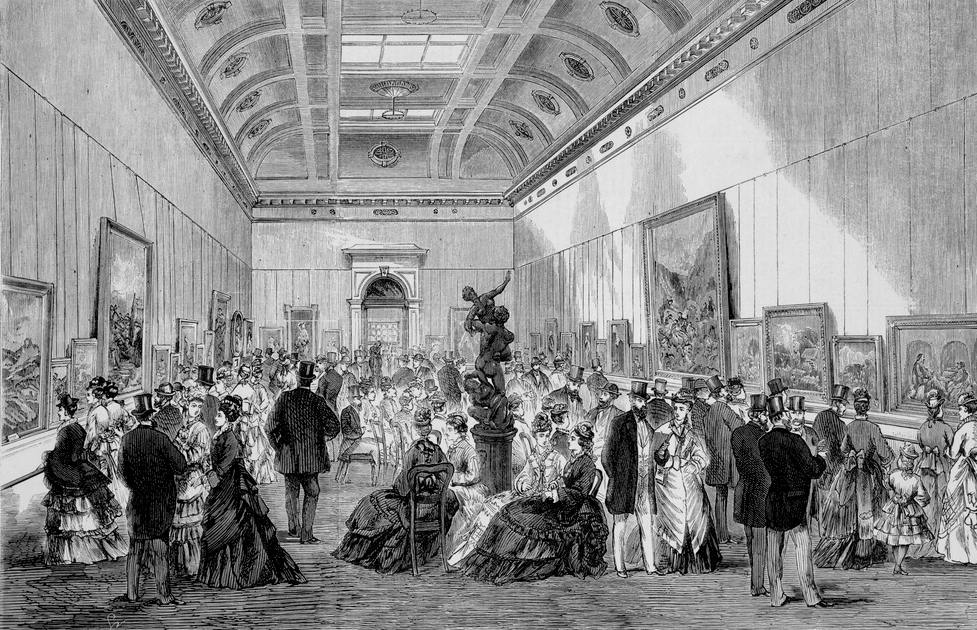
Opening of the McArthur Gallery in 1875, now home to the State Library of Victoria's painting collection

On 24 May 1874, the first purpose-built gallery, known as the McArthur Gallery, opened in the McArthur room of the State Library, and the following year, the Museum of Art was renamed the National Gallery of Victoria. The McArthur Gallery was only ever intended as a temporary home until the much grander vision was to be realised. However such an edifice did not eventuate and the complex was instead developed incrementally over several decades.

The National Gallery of Victoria Art School, associated with the gallery, was founded in 1867 and remained the leading centre for academic art training in Australia until about 1910. The school's graduates went on to become some of Australia's most significant artists. This later became the VCA (Victorian College of the Arts), which was bought by the University of Melbourne in 2007 after it went bankrupt.

In 1887, the Buvelot Gallery (later Swinburne Hall) was opened, along with the Painting School studios. In 1892, two more galleries were added: Stawell (now Cowen) and La Trobe.

In 1888, the gallery purchased Lawrence Alma-Tadema's 1871 painting The Vintage Festival for £4000, its most expensive acquisition of the 19th century.

=== 20th century ===
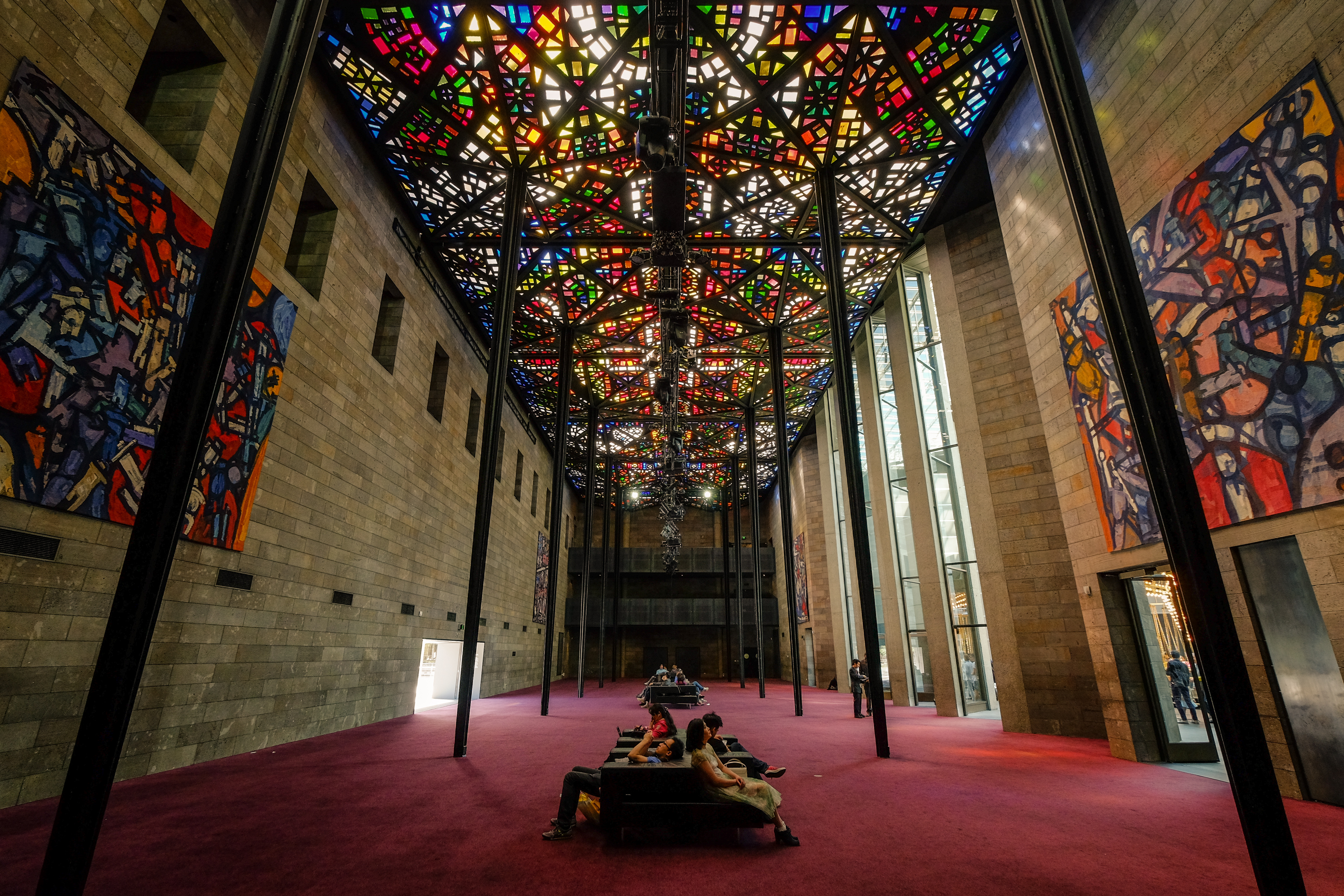
The Great Hall ceiling, the world's largest stained-glass ceiling, designed by Melbourne artist Leonard French

The gallery's collection was built from both gifts of works of art and monetary donations. The most significant, the Felton Bequest, was established by the will of Alfred Felton and, from 1904, has been used to purchase over 15,000 works of art.

Since the Felton Bequest, the gallery had long held plans to build a permanent facility; however, it was not until 1943 that the state government chose a site, Wirth's Park, just south of the Yarra River, which was reserved by the Melbourne South Land Act 1946 (No. 5176). The National Art Gallery and Cultural Centre Act 1956 (No. 6025) established a 'National Art Gallery and Cultural Centre Building Committee' to oversee the project. £3 million was put forward in February 1960 and Roy Grounds was announced as the architect.

In 1959, the commission to design a new gallery was awarded to the architectural firm Grounds Romberg Boyd. In 1962, Roy Grounds split from his partners, Frederick Romberg and Robin Boyd, retained the commission, and designed the gallery at 180 St Kilda Road (now known as NGV International). The new bluestone clad building was completed in December 1967, and Victorian Premier Henry Bolte officially opened it on 20 August 1968. One of the features of the building is the Leonard French stained-glass ceiling, one of the world's largest pieces of suspended stained glass, which casts colourful light on the floor below. The water-wall entrance is another well-known feature of the building.

In 1997, redevelopment of the building was proposed, with Mario Bellini chosen as architect and an estimated project cost of $161.9 million. The design was extensive, creating all new galleries while leaving only the exterior, the central courtyard and Great Hall intact. The plans included doing away with the water wall, but following public protests organised by the National Trust of Victoria, the design was altered to include a new one slightly forward of the original. During the redevelopment, many works were moved to a temporary external annex known as 'NGV on Russell', at the State Library, with its entrance on Russell Street.

=== 21st century ===
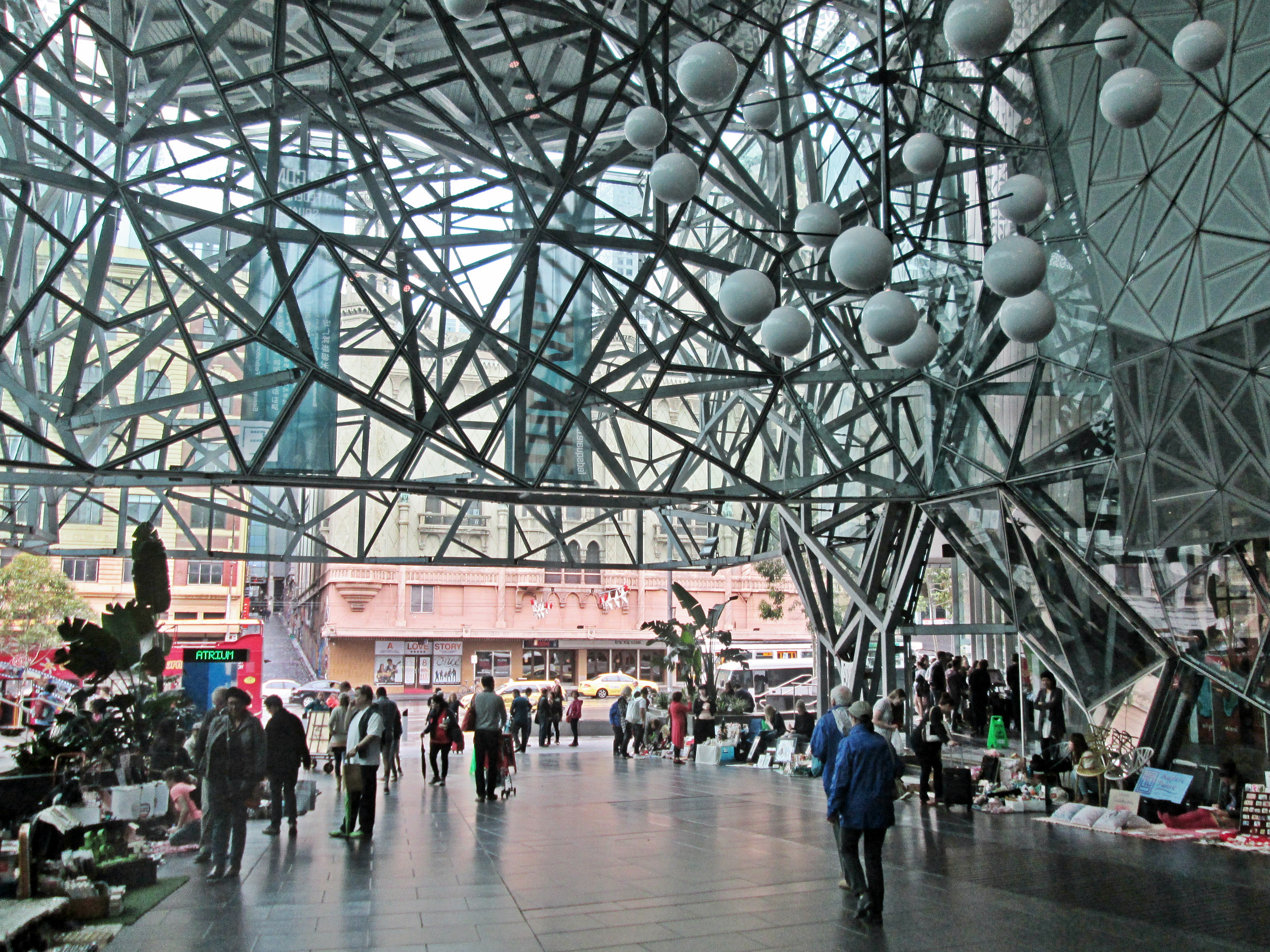
The Federation Square Atrium leads to the Ian Potter Centre, which houses NGV Australia.

A major fundraising drive was launched on 10 October 2000 to redevelop the ageing St Kilda Road building and although the state government committed the majority of the funds, private donations were sought in addition to federal funding. The drive achieved its aim and secured $15 million from the Ian Potter Foundation on 11 July 2000, $3 million from Loti Smorgon, $2 million from the Clemenger Foundation, and $1 million each from James Fairfax and the Pratt Foundation.

NGV on Russell closed on 30 June 2002 to make way for the staged opening of the new St Kilda Road gallery. It was officially opened by premier Steve Bracks on 4 December 2003.

The Ian Potter Centre: NGV Australia in Federation Square was designed by Lab Architecture Studio to house the NGV's Australian art collection. It opened in 2002. As such, the NGV's collection is now housed in two separate buildings, with Grounds' building renamed NGV International.

From 15 December 2024 to 21 April 2025, the NGV hosted a Yayoi Kusama exhibition, which was the largest exhibition the NGV had ever dedicated to a single living artist, with the exhibition traversing the entire ground floor of NGV International and spilling out onto St Kilda Road; the exhibition drew 570,537 attendees over its run, making it the highest attended ticketed exhibition in the NGV's history and the highest attended ticketed visual art exhibition held in Australia, with over 24% of visitors who attended the exhibition coming from interstate or overseas.

== Locations ==
=== St Kilda Road: NGV International ===
NGV international is located at 180 St Kilda Rd and houses the NGV's European, Asian, Oceanic and American art collections. It houses a number of permanent displays, arranged by region and chronology. It also has a large ground-floor space used for temporary exhibitions, and contemporary art spaces on level 3 are also used for temporary exhibitions. The building is surrounded by a moat and fountains, while the main entrance features a famous water wall, which has been used to display the art of Keith Haring and others. At the rear of NGV International is a sculpture garden, which hosts an annual large-scale installation through the NGV Architecture Commission.

=== Ian Potter Centre: NGV Australia ===
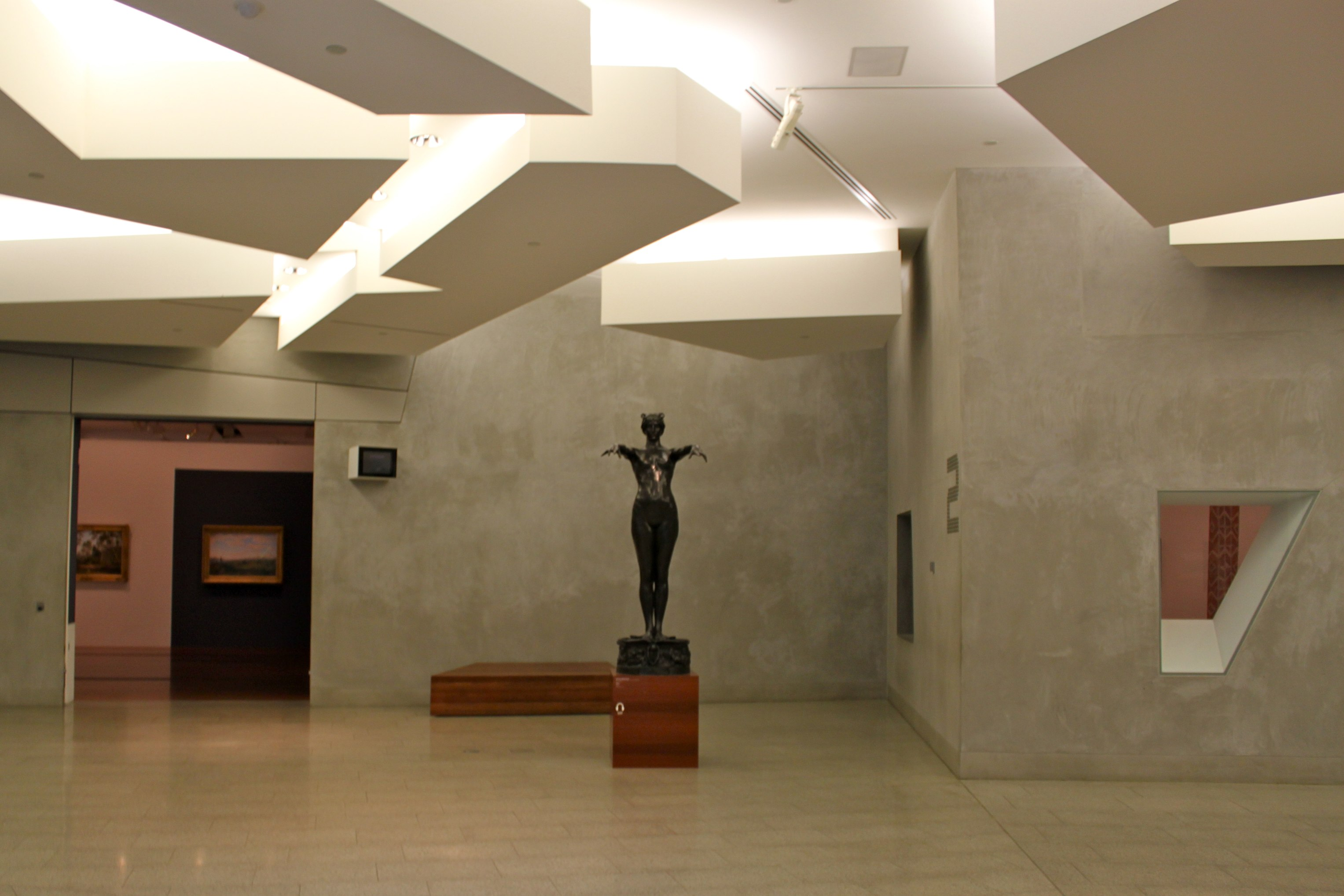
Inside the Ian Potter Centre

NGV Australia is located in the Ian Potter Centre at Federation Square. The building houses the NGV's Australian collection, with a permanent display presenting a chronological history of Australian art and a selection of the galley's 25,000 Australian works. NGV Australia has a particular focus on Indigenous Australian art, and alongside the permanent displays presents temporary exhibitions relating to Australian art and history.

=== The Fox: NGV Contemporary ===
In 2018, the State Government of Victoria announced a new contemporary art gallery would be built behind the Arts Centre and the existing NGV International building. The Government spent $203 million to begin the project, including $150 million to purchase the former Carlton and United Breweries building for the new gallery. The new building is part of a major new $1.7 billion redevelopment of the surrounding Melbourne Arts Precinct which is planned to include 18,000 square metres of new public space, new space for contemporary art and design exhibitions, and a new home for the Australian Performing Arts Gallery. The Ian Potter Foundation pledged $20 million for the new building. The masterplan for the precinct was approved in 2022. The public space is being designed by architecture firms HASSELL and SO-IL with a new elevated garden connecting Hamer Hall and Southbank Boulevard.

The winner of the design competition for the NGV Contemporary was announced in March 2022 as Angelo Candalepas and Associates. In April it was announced that billionaires Paula and Lindsay Fox had donated $100 million to the NGV Contemporary project in the largest ever donation to an Australian art museum, and that the gallery would be named The Fox: NGV Contemporary. The new gallery will have 13,000 square metres of exhibition space and is planned to open in 2028. It will be Australia's largest contemporary gallery.

== Collection ==
=== Asian art ===
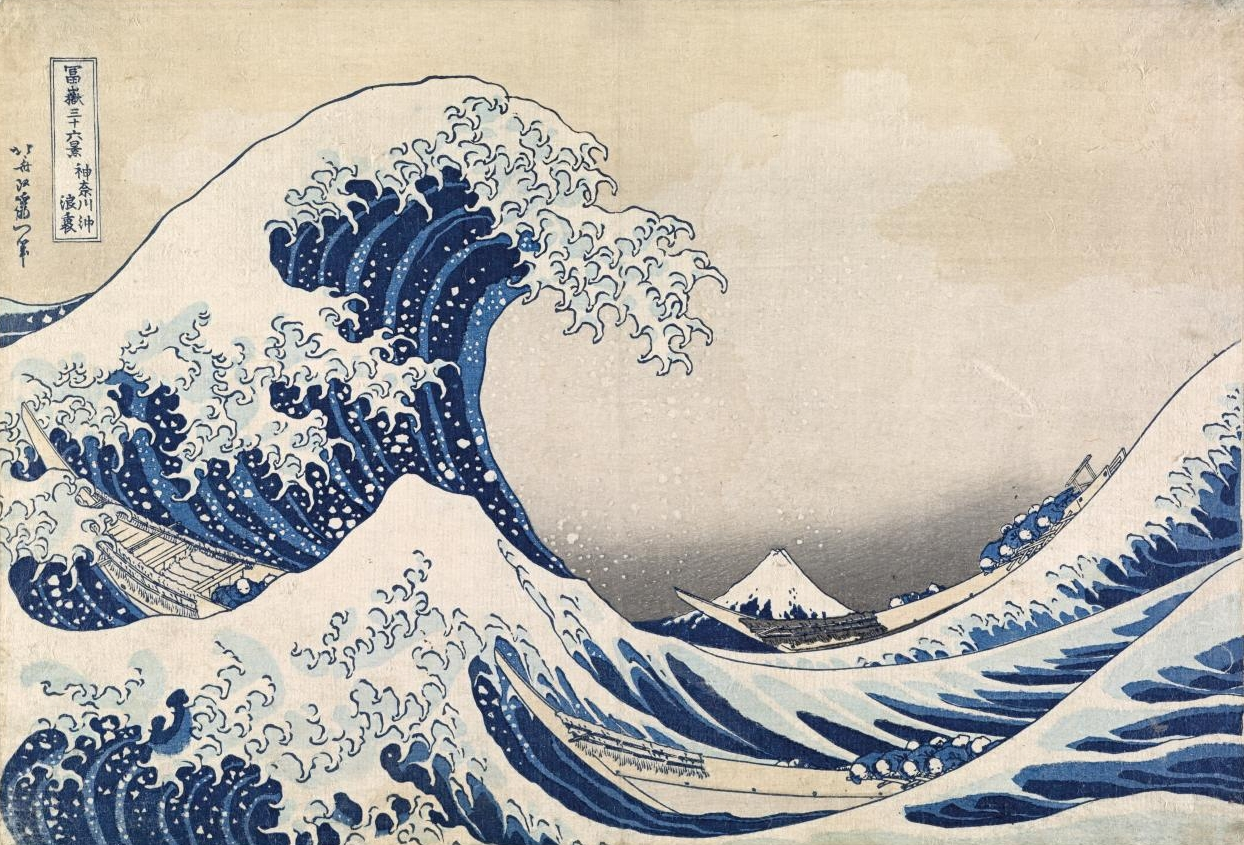
Katsushika Hokusai, The Great Wave off Kanagawa, c. 1830

The NGV's Asian art collection began in 1862, one year after the gallery's founding, when Frederick Dalgety donated two Chinese plates. The Asian collection has since grown to include significant works from across the continent.

=== Australian art ===
The NGV's Australian art collection encompasses Indigenous (Australian Aboriginal) art and artefacts, Australian colonial art, Australian Impressionist art, 20th century, modern and contemporary art. The first curator of Australian Art was Brian Finemore, from 1960 until his death in 1975.

The 1880s saw the birth and development of the Heidelberg School (also known as Australian Impressionism) in the outer suburbs of Melbourne, and the NGV was well-placed to acquire some of the movement's key artworks, including Tom Roberts' Shearing the Rams (1890), Arthur Streeton's The purple noon's transparent might (1896), and Frederick McCubbin's The Pioneer (1904).

The Australian collection includes works by Del Kathryn Barton, Charles Blackman, Clarice Beckett, Arthur Boyd, John Brack, Angela Brennan, Rupert Bunny, Louis Buvelot, Ethel Carrick, Nicholas Chevalier, Charles Conder, Olive Cotton, Grace Crowley David Davies, Destiny Deacon, William Dobell, Julie Dowling, Russell Drysdale, E. Phillips Fox, Rosalie Gascoigne, John Glover, Eugene von Guerard, Fiona Hall, Louise Hearman, Joy Hester, Hans Heysen, Emily Kame Kngwarreye, George W. Lambert, Sydney Long, John Longstaff, Frederick McCubbin, Helen Maudsley, Tracey Moffatt, Jan Nelson, Hilda Rix Nicholas, Sidney Nolan, John Perceval, Patricia Piccinini, Margaret Preston, Thea Proctor, Hugh Ramsay, David Rankin, Tom Roberts, John Russell, Grace Cossington Smith, Ethel Spowers, Arthur Streeton, Clara Southern, Jane Sutherland, Violet Teague, Jenny Watson, Fred Williams and others.

A large number of works were donated by Dr. Joseph Brown in 2004 which form the Joseph Brown Collection.

Selected works

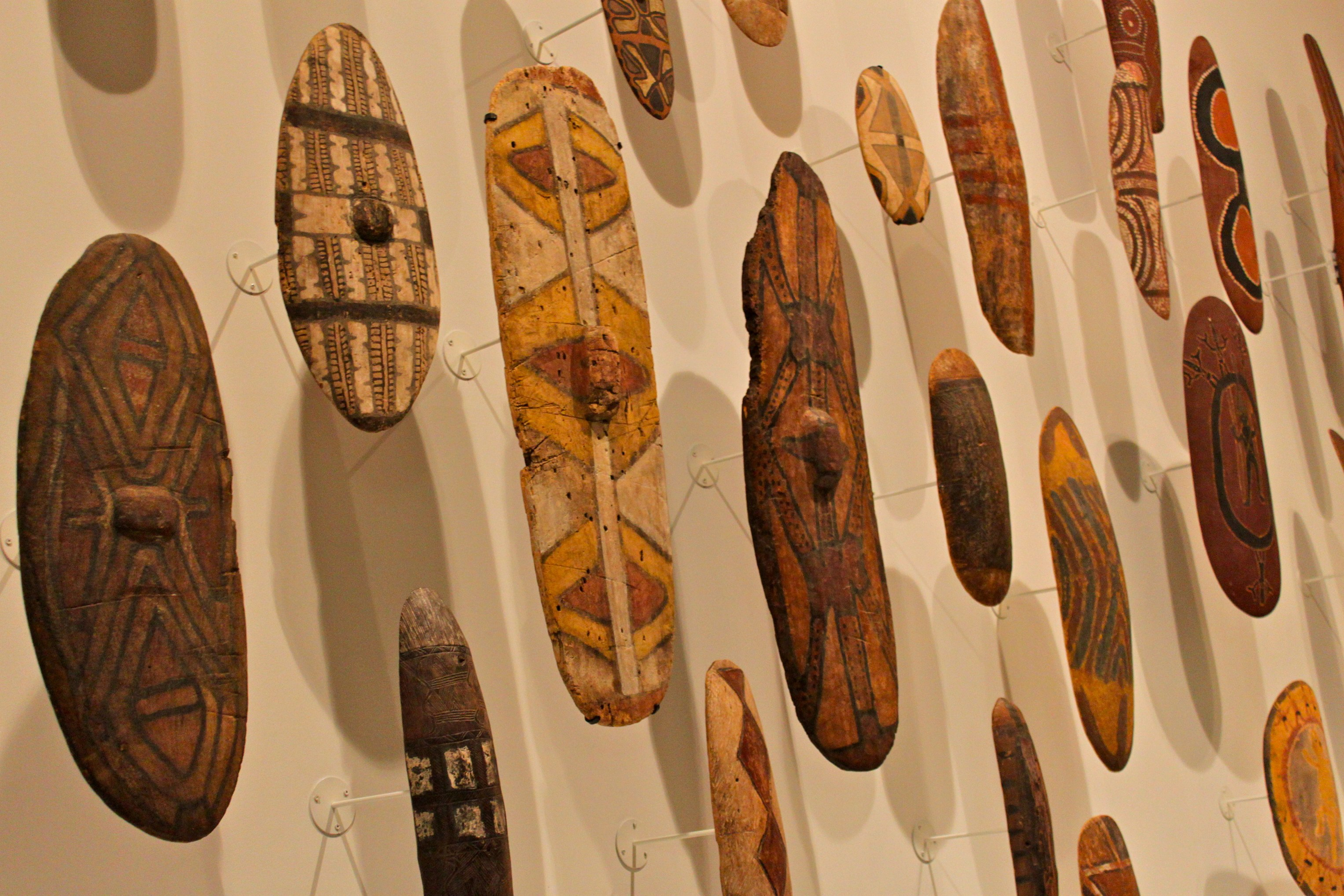
Aboriginal shields

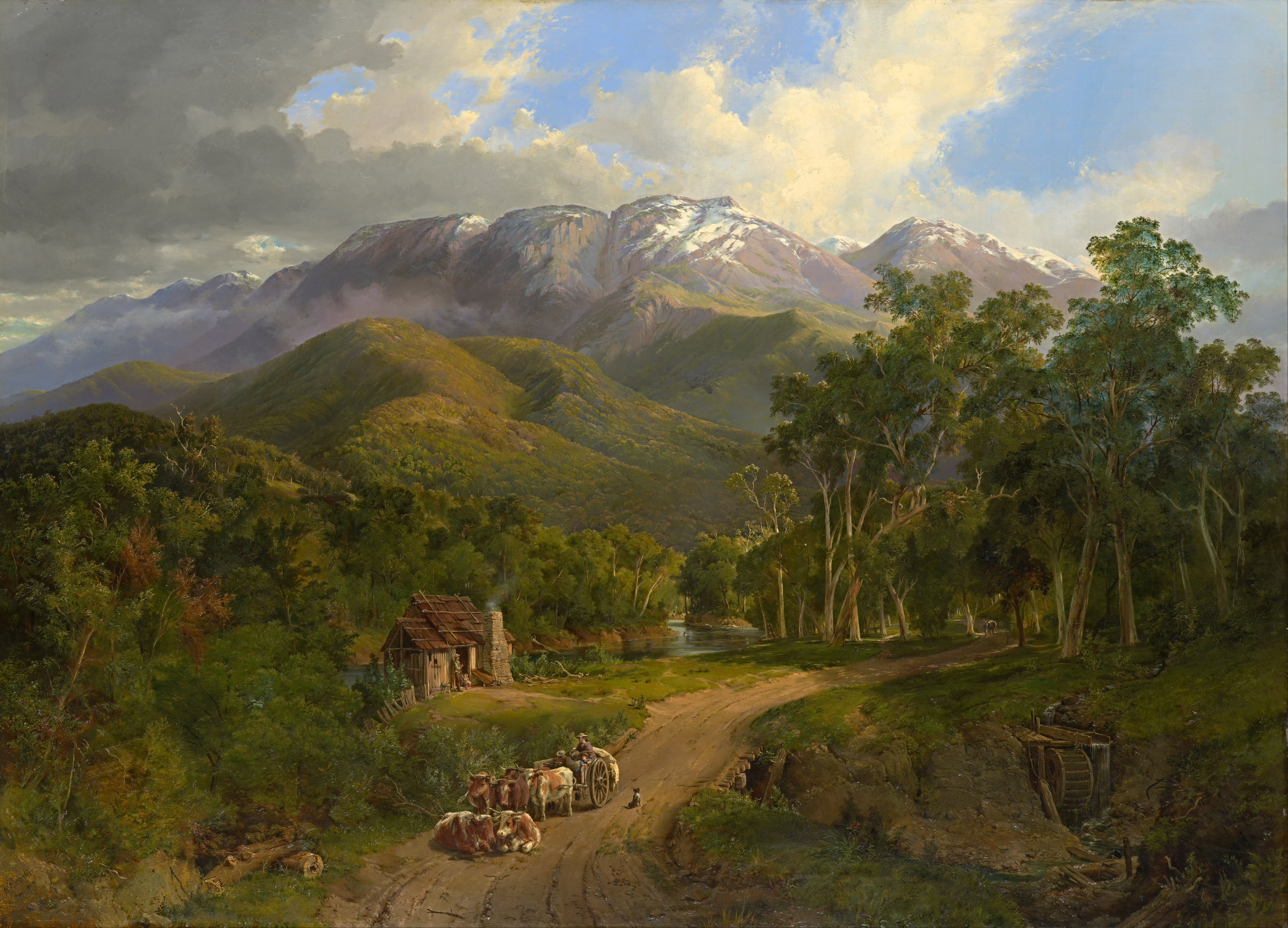
The Buffalo Ranges (1864) by Nicholas Chevalier, the first painting of an Australian subject to be acquired by the gallery

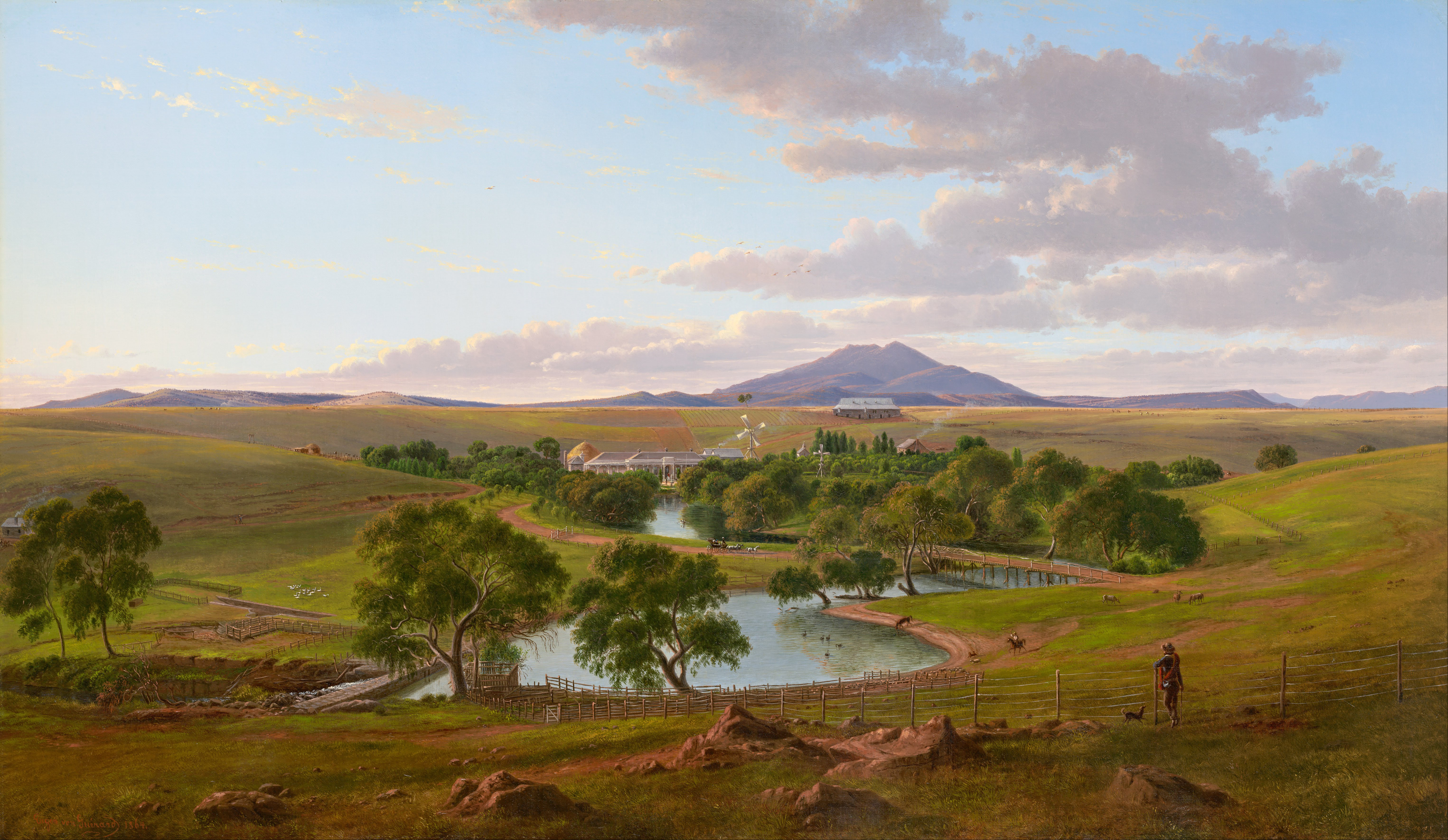
Eugene von Guerard, Yalla-y-Poora, 1864

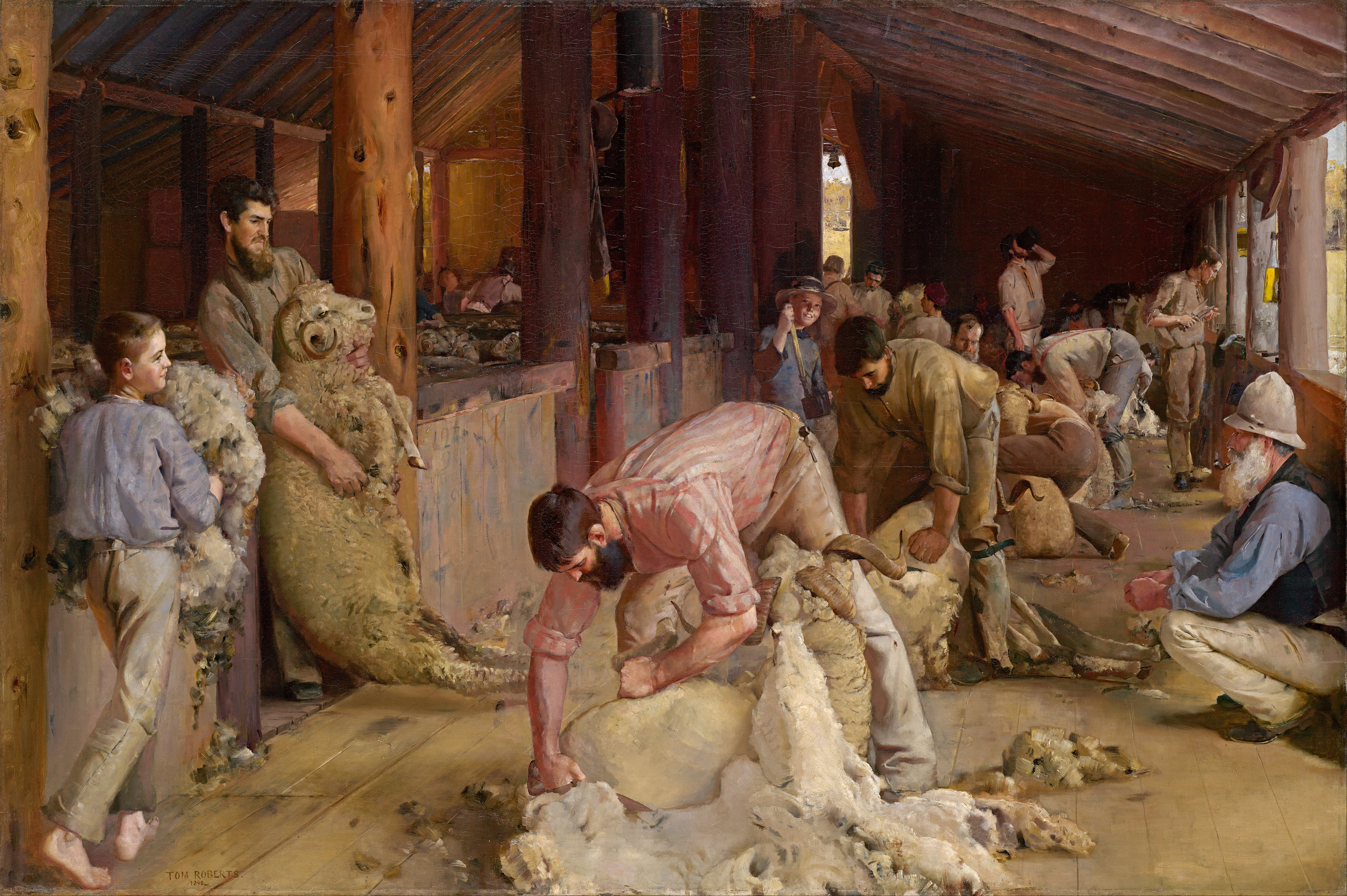
Tom Roberts, Shearing the Rams, 1890

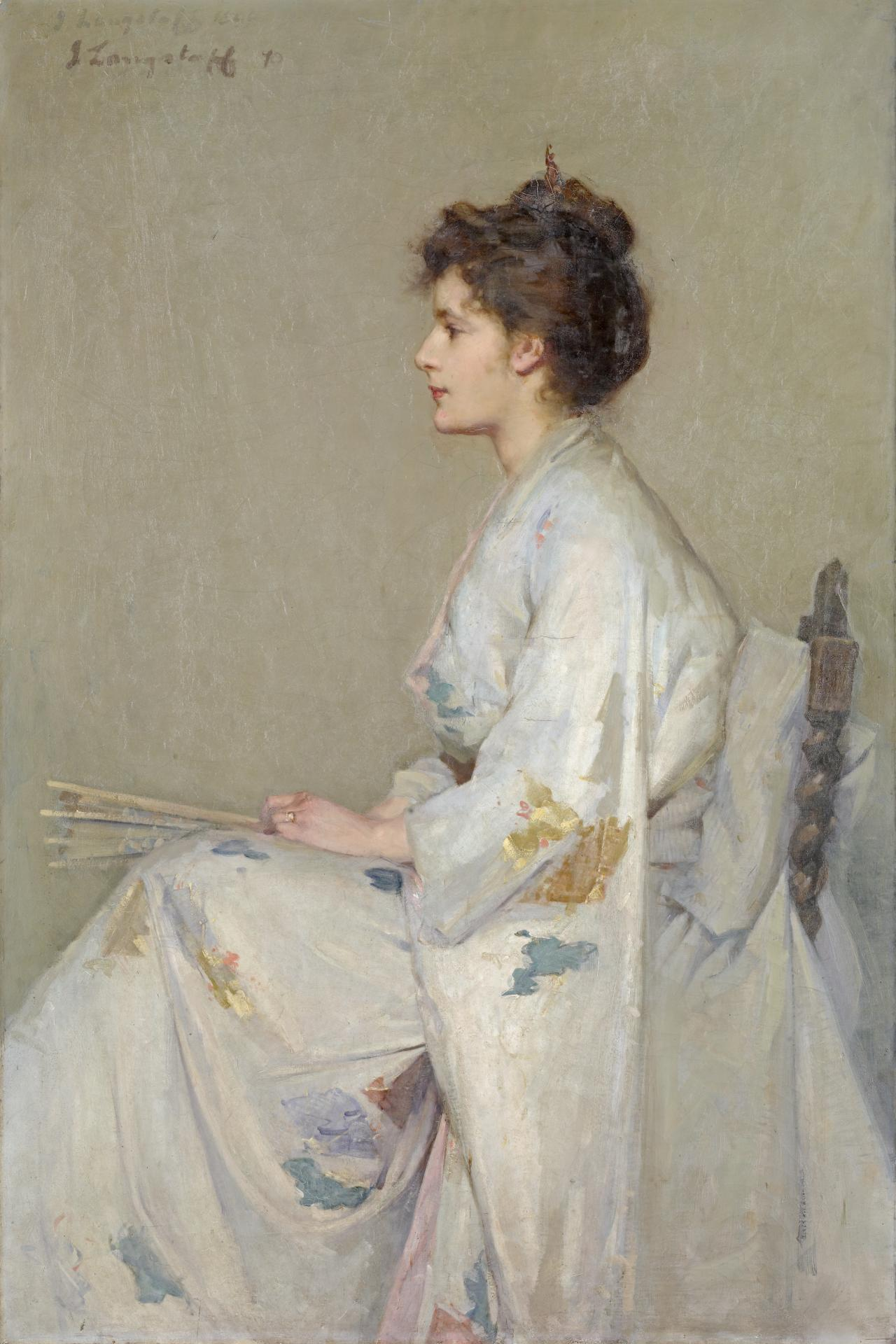
John Longstaff, Lady in Grey, 1890

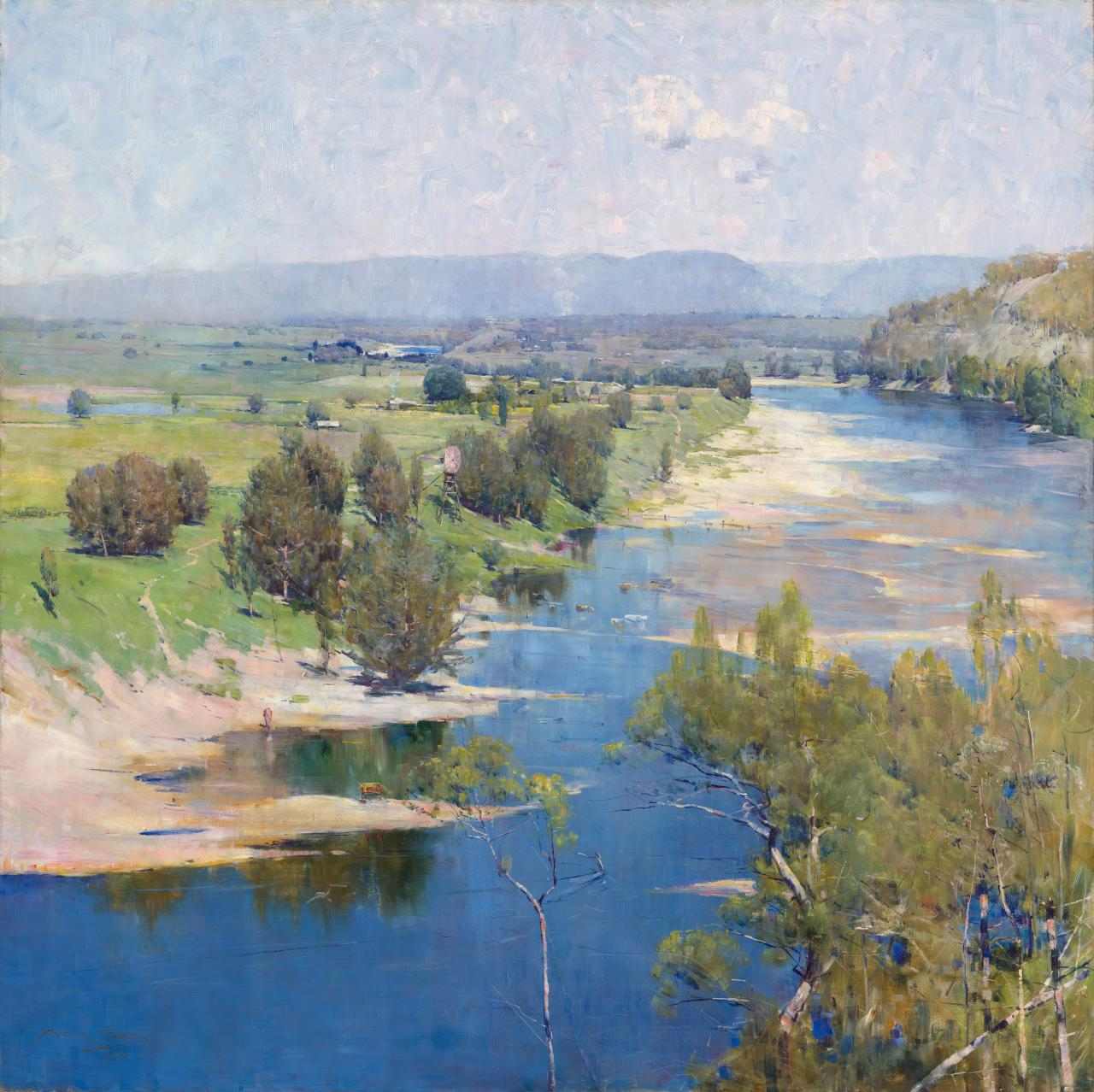
Arthur Streeton, The purple noon's transparent might, 1896

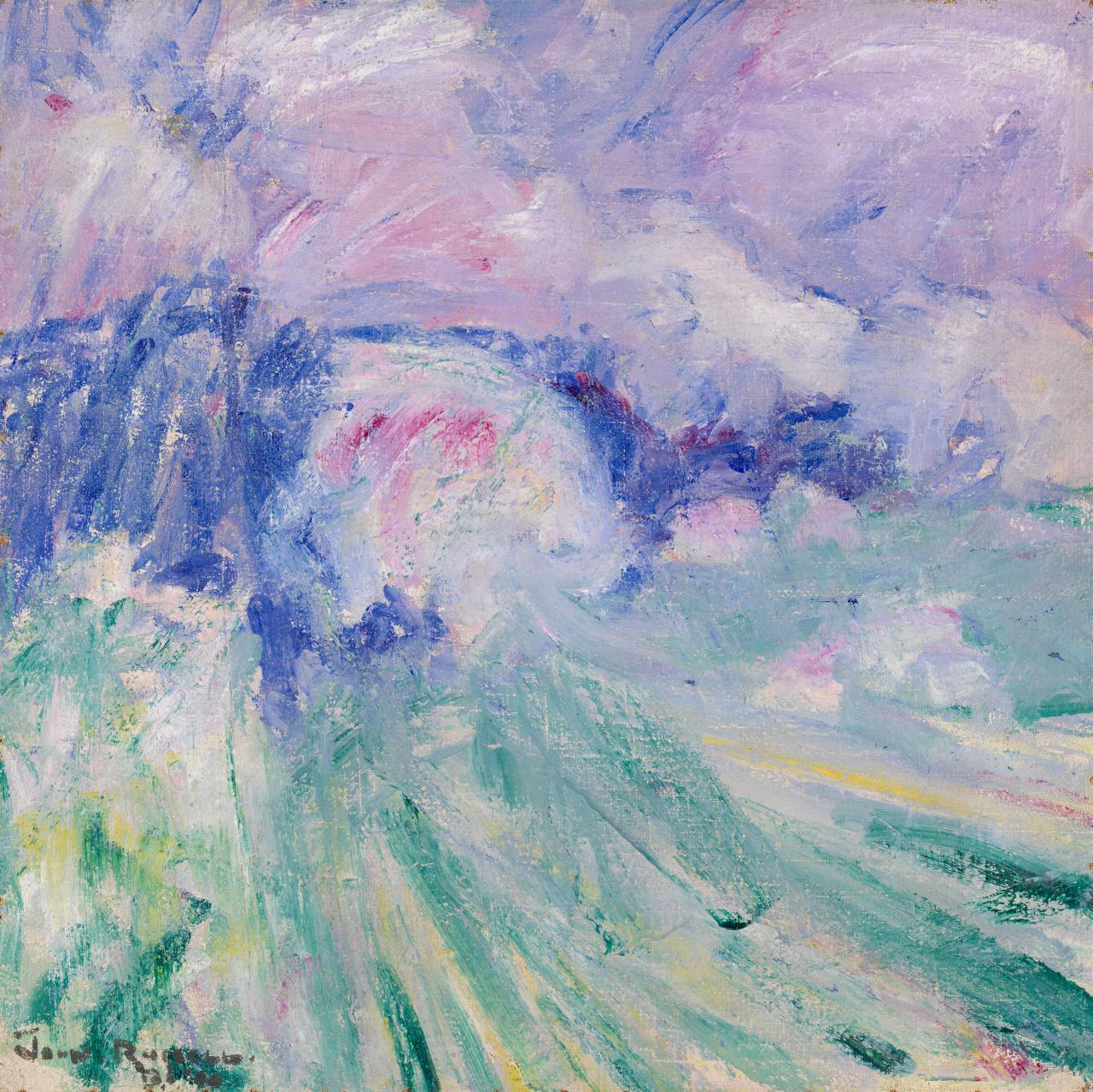
John Russell, Rough Sea, Belle-Île, c. 1900

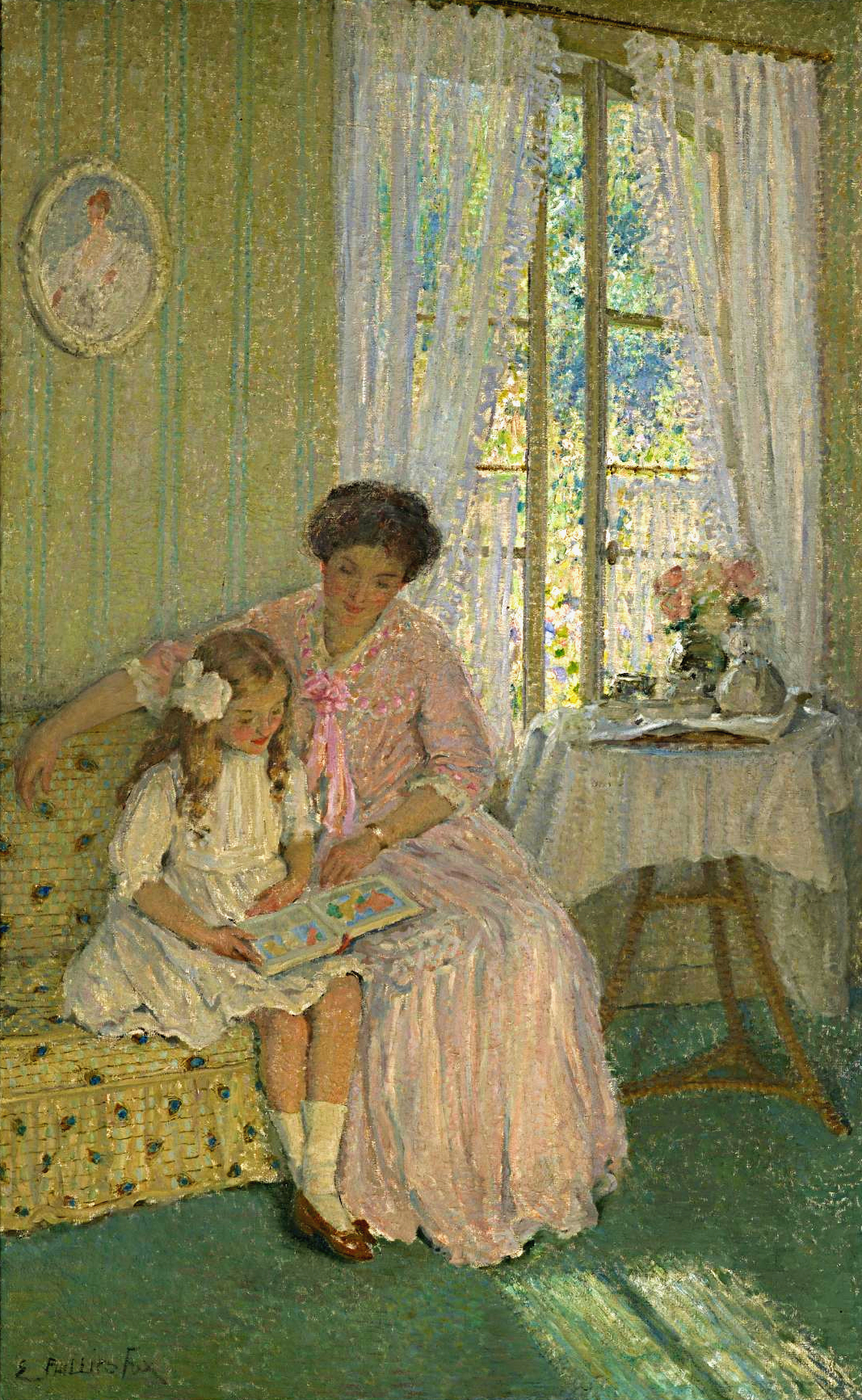
E. Phillips Fox, The Lesson, 1912

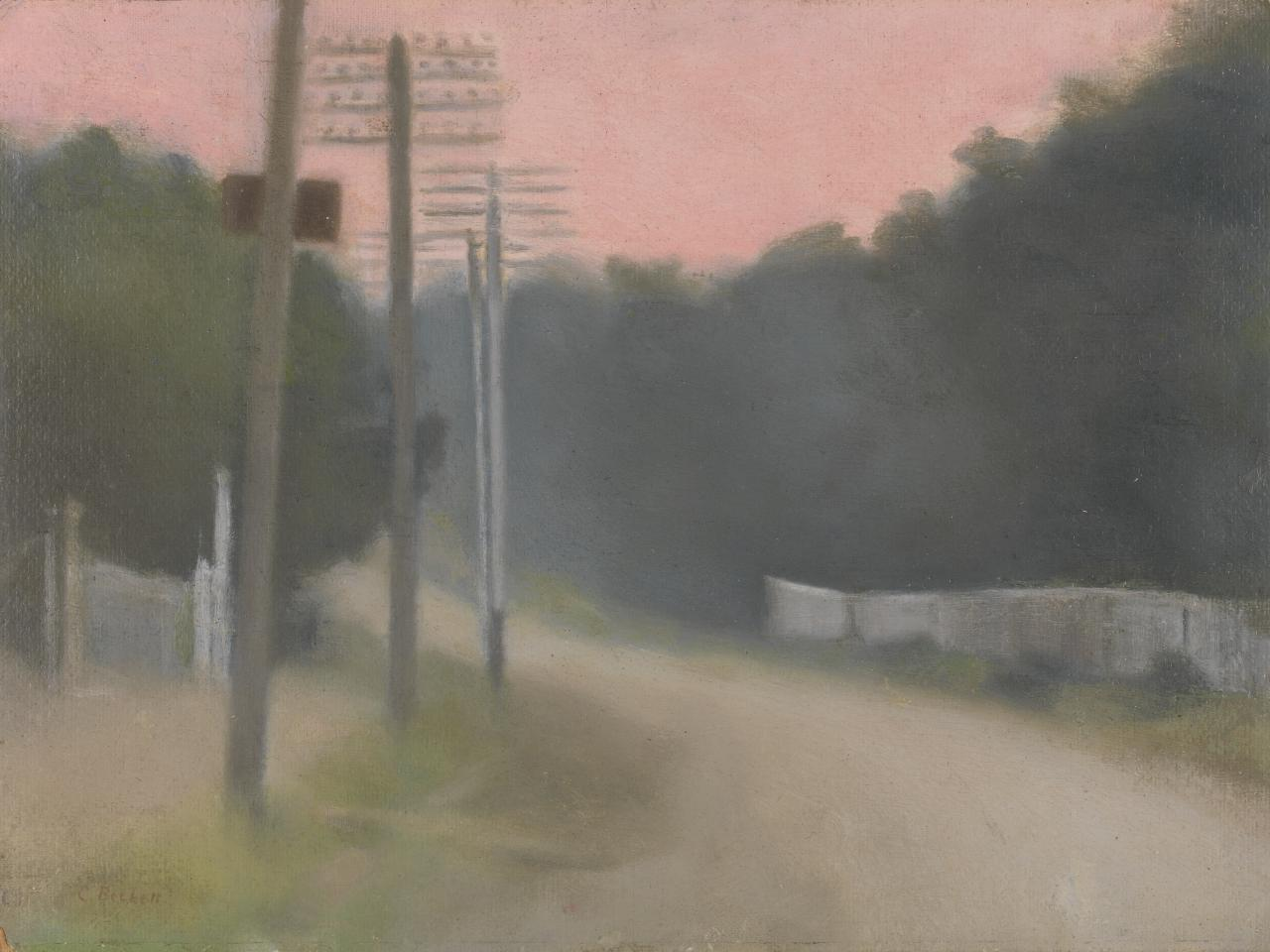
Clarice Beckett, Evening light, Beaumaris, c. 1925

=== International art ===
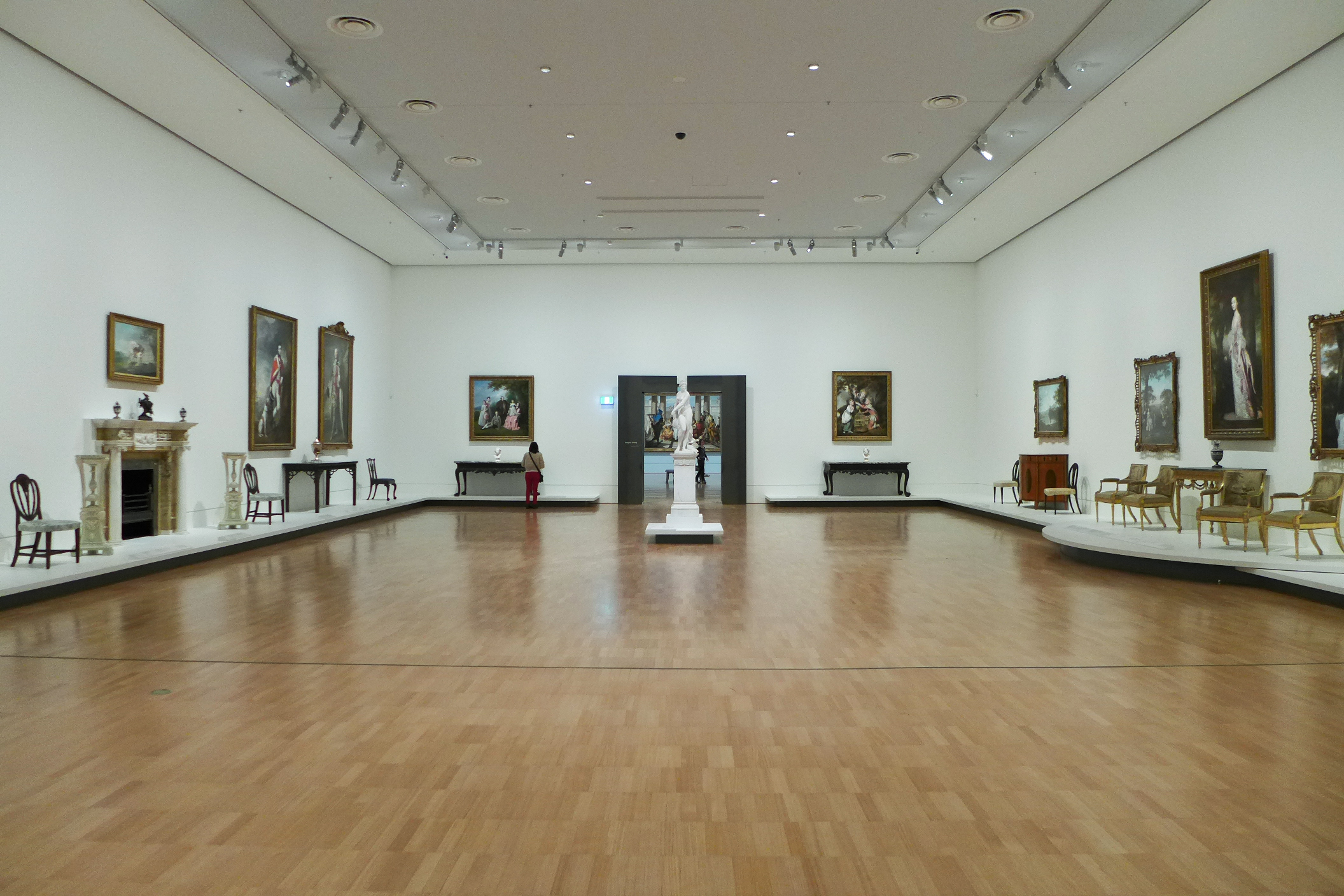
18th-century British gallery

The NGV's international art collection encompasses European and international paintings, fashion and textiles, photography, prints and drawings, Asian art, decorative arts, Mesoamerican art, Pacific art, sculpture, antiquities and global contemporary art. It has strong collections in areas as diverse as old masters, Greek vases, Egyptian artefacts and historical European ceramics, and contains the largest and most comprehensive range of artworks in Australia.

The international collection includes works by Arbus, Bernini, Bonnard, Bordone, Canaletto, Cézanne, Constable, Correggio, Dalí, Degas, Delaunay, van Dyck, Emin, Gainsborough, Gentileschi, El Greco, Lange, Manet, Matisse, Memling, Modigliani, Monet, Moore, Munch, Picasso, Pissarro, Pittoni, Poussin, Rembrandt, Renoir, Ribera, Riley, Rothko, Rubens, Soulages, Tiepolo, Tintoretto, Titian, Turner, Uccello, Veronese and others.

One of the highlights of the NGV's international collection is Auguste Rodin's first cast of his iconic sculpture The Thinker, executed in 1884. The NGV is also home to the only portrait of Lucrezia Borgia known to have been painted from life, dated to approximately 1515 and attributed to Dosso Dossi.

Selected works

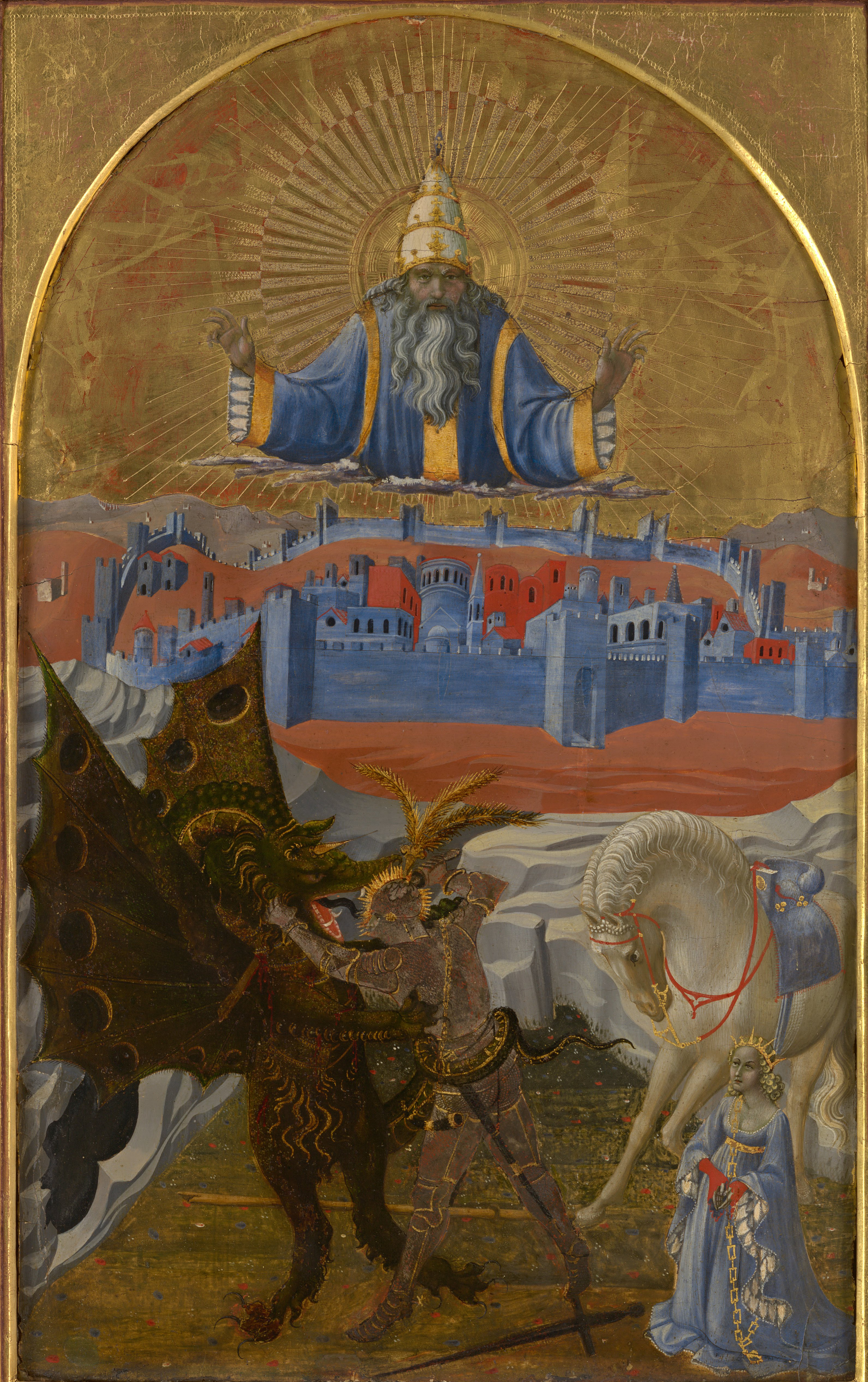
Paolo Uccello, St. George Slaying the Dragon, 1430

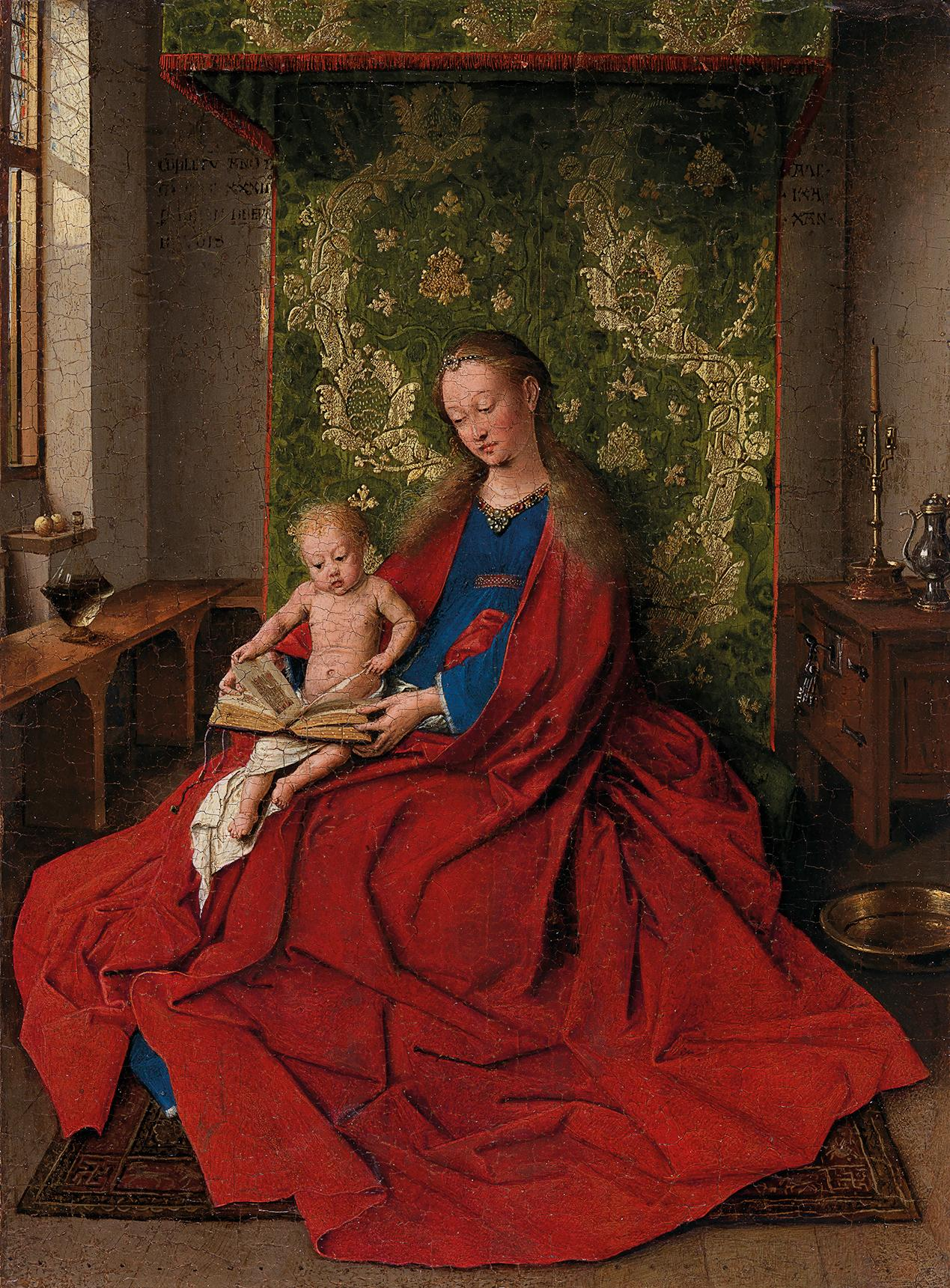
Jan van Eyck (workshop), Ince Hall Madonna, 1433

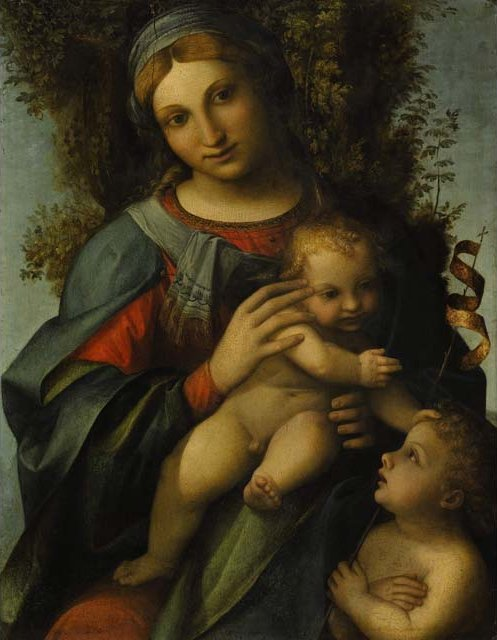
Correggio, Madonna and Child with infant St John the Baptist, 1514–15

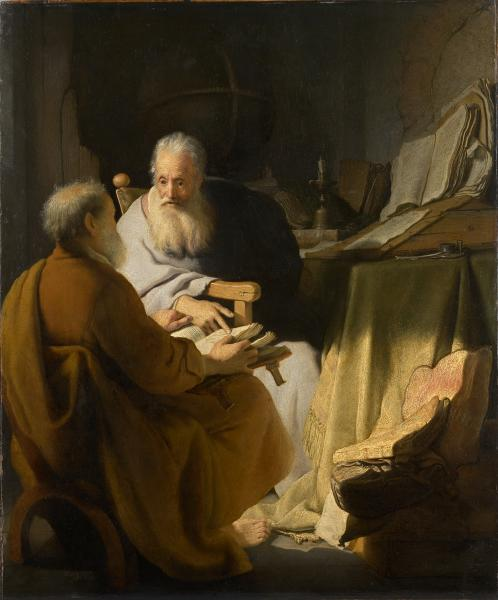
Rembrandt, Two old men disputing, 1628

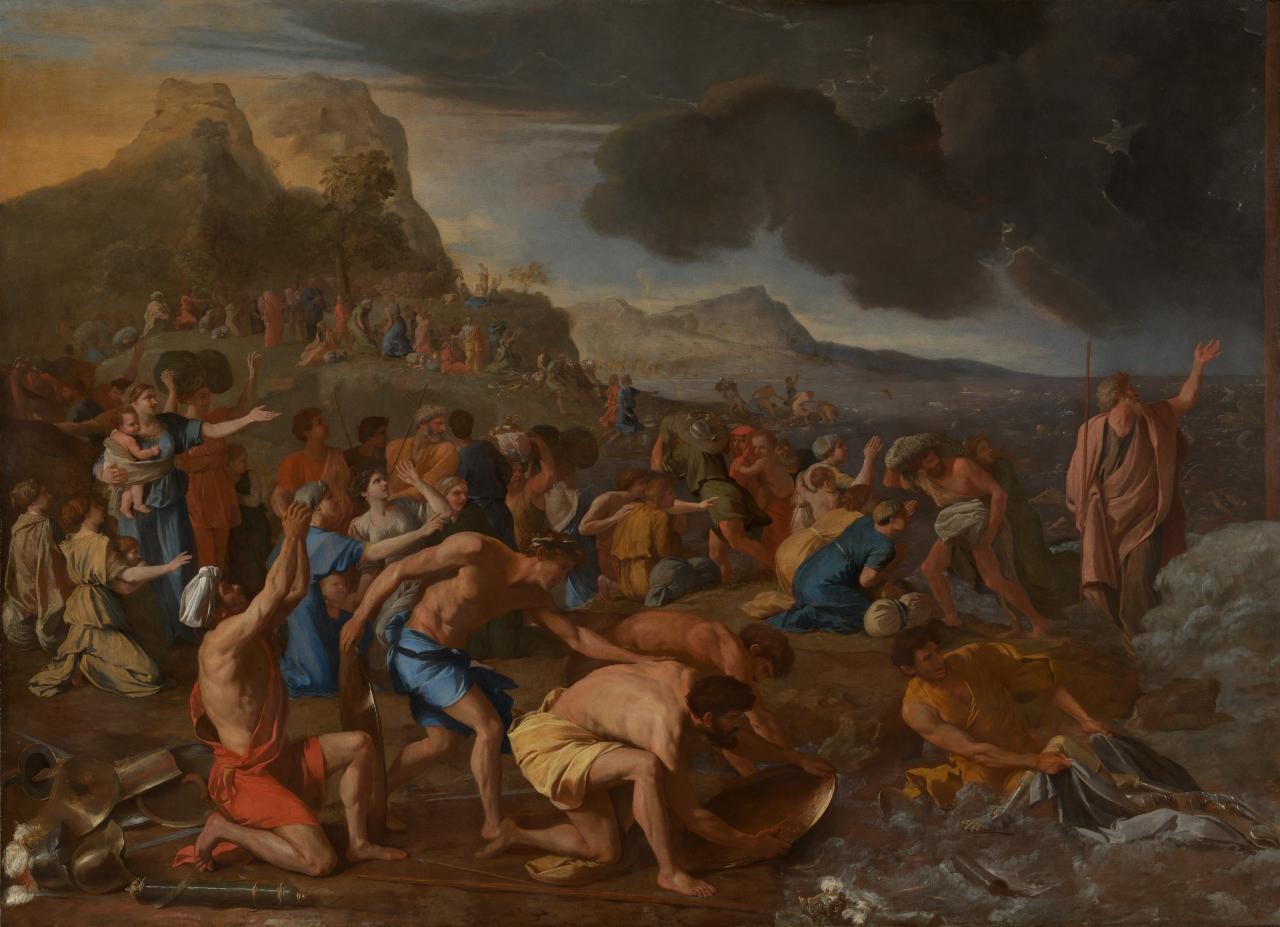
Nicolas Poussin, The Crossing of the Red Sea, 1634

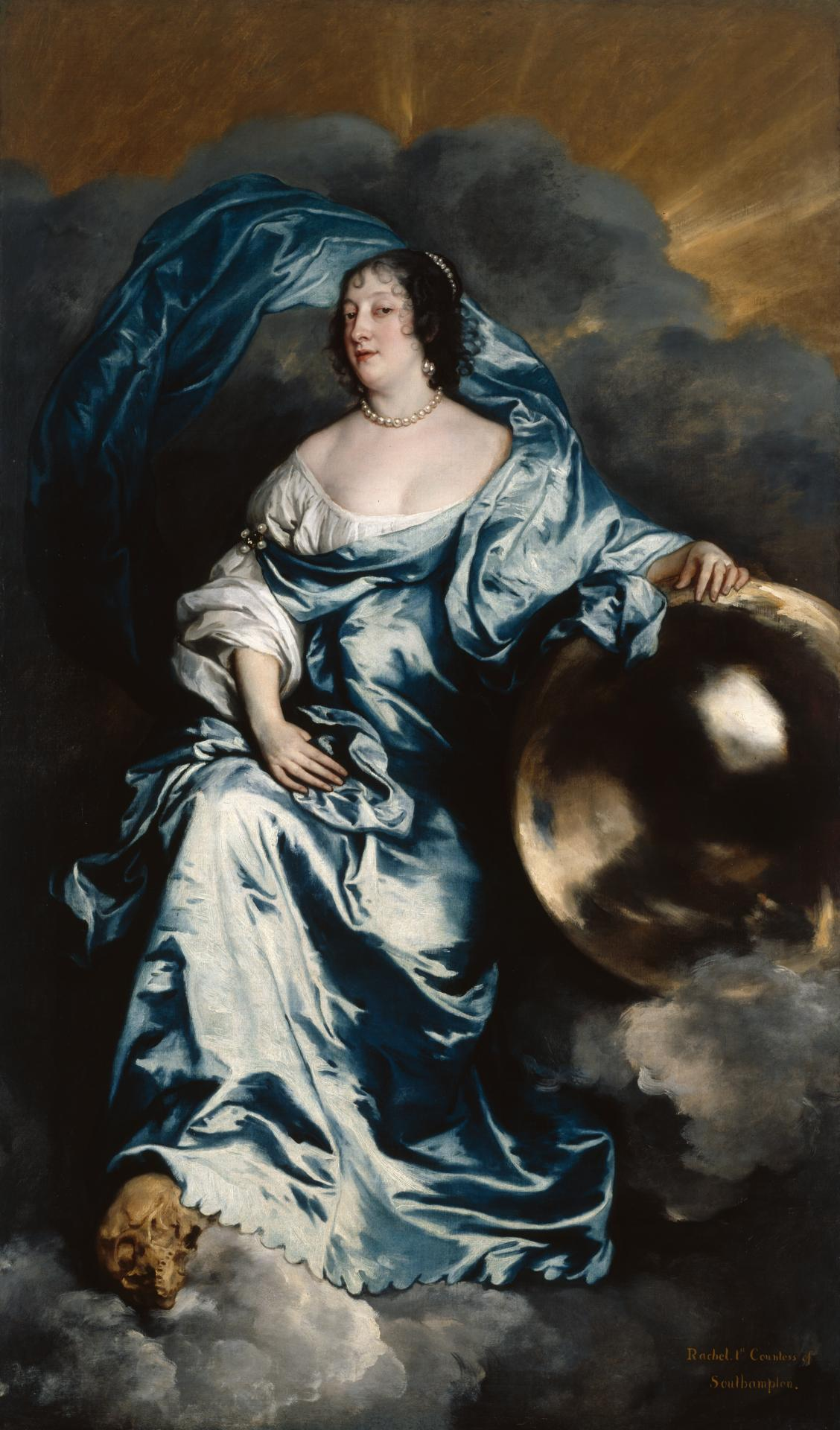
Anthony van Dyck, Rachel de Ruvigny, Countess of Southampton, 1640

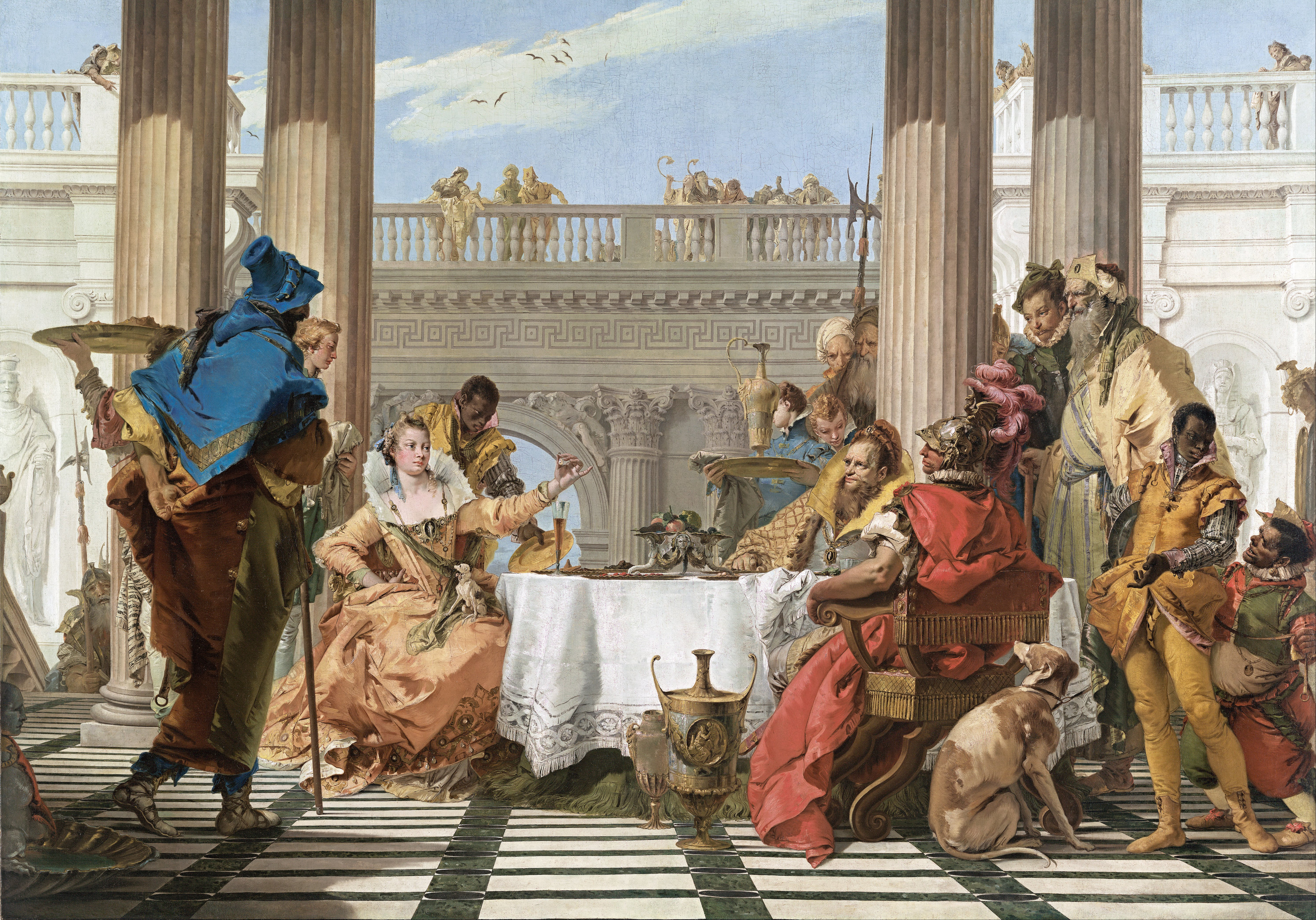
Giovanni Battista Tiepolo, The Banquet of Cleopatra, 1743–44

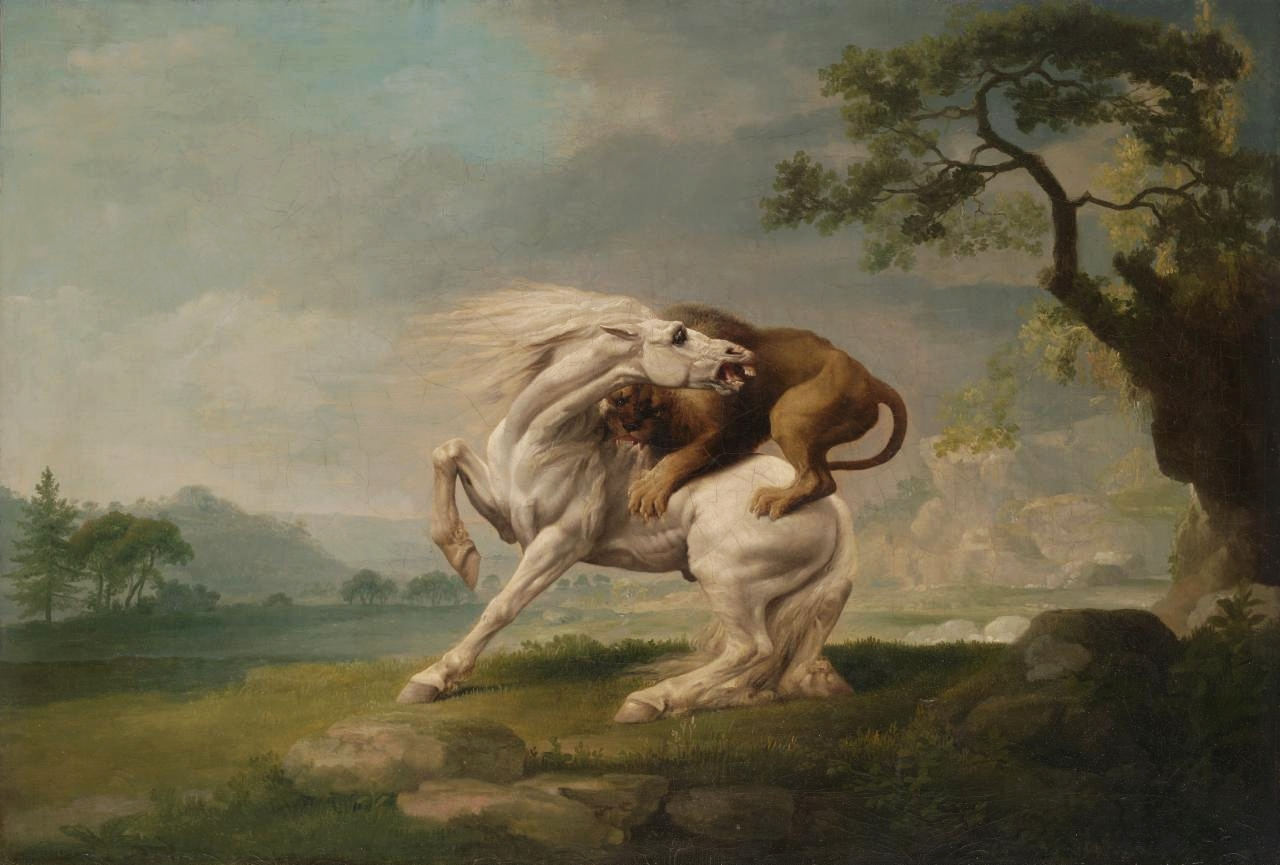
George Stubbs, A Lion Attacking a Horse, 1765

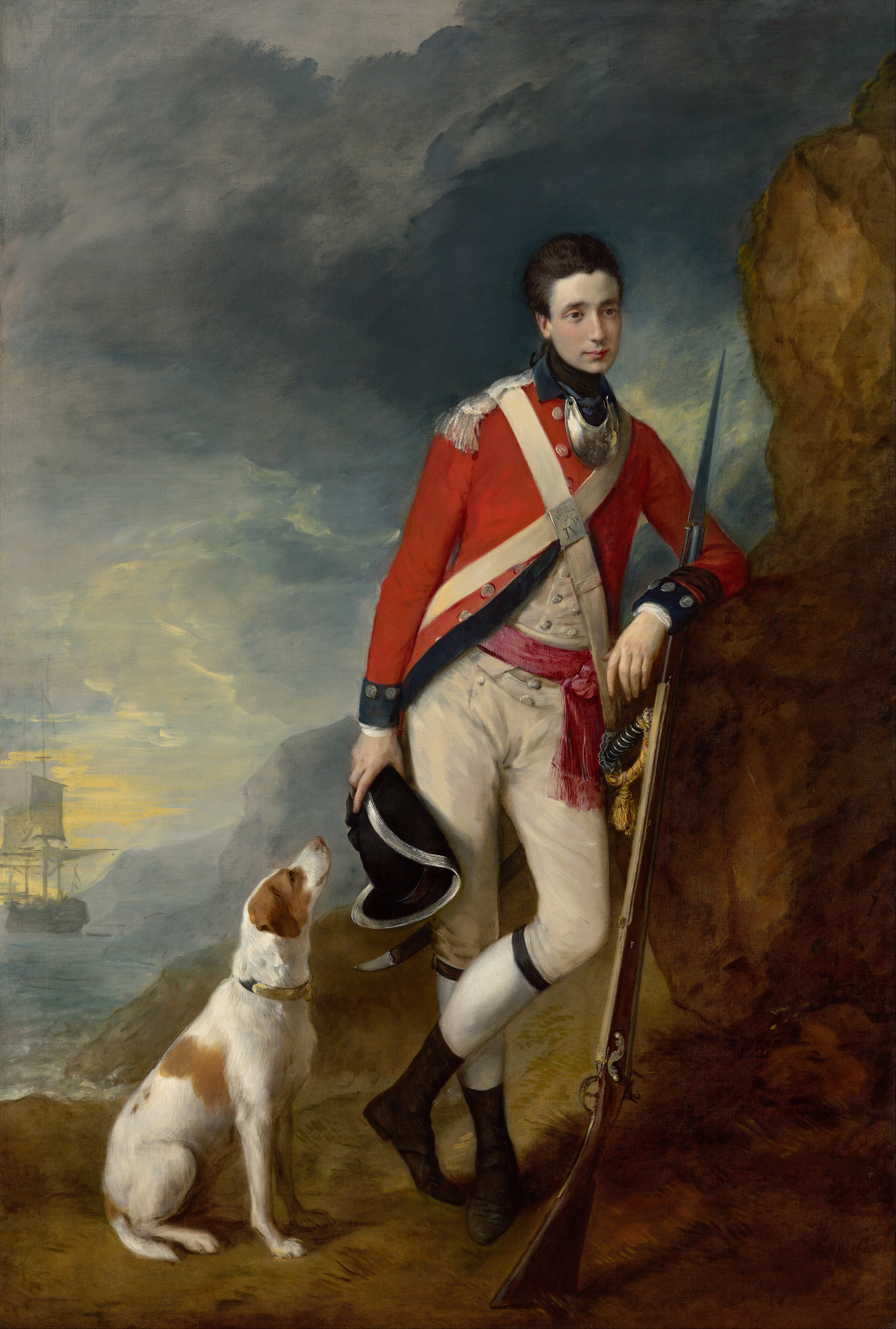
Thomas Gainsborough, Richard St George Mansergh-St George, 1776

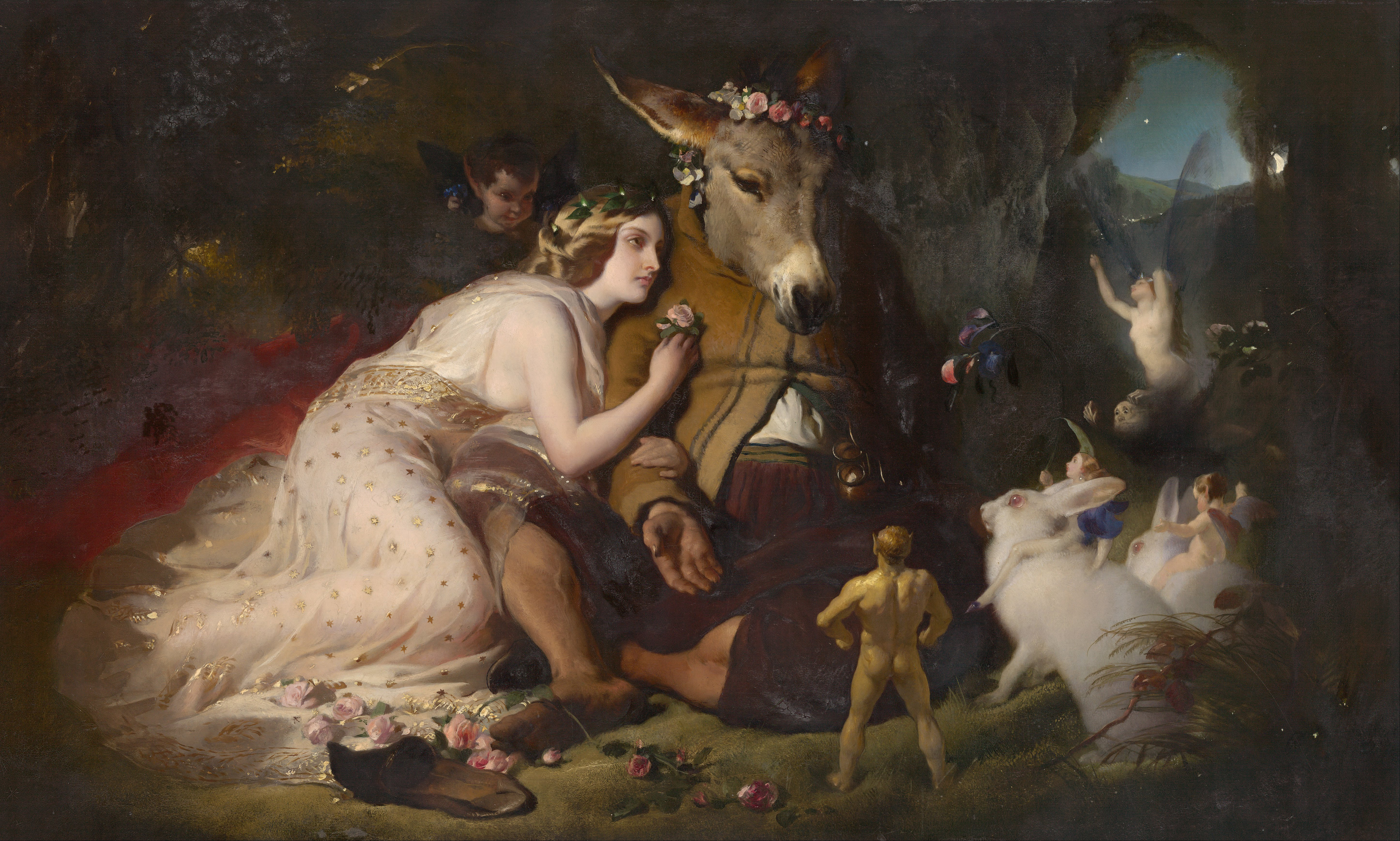
Edwin Landseer, Scene from A Midsummer Night's Dream, 1851

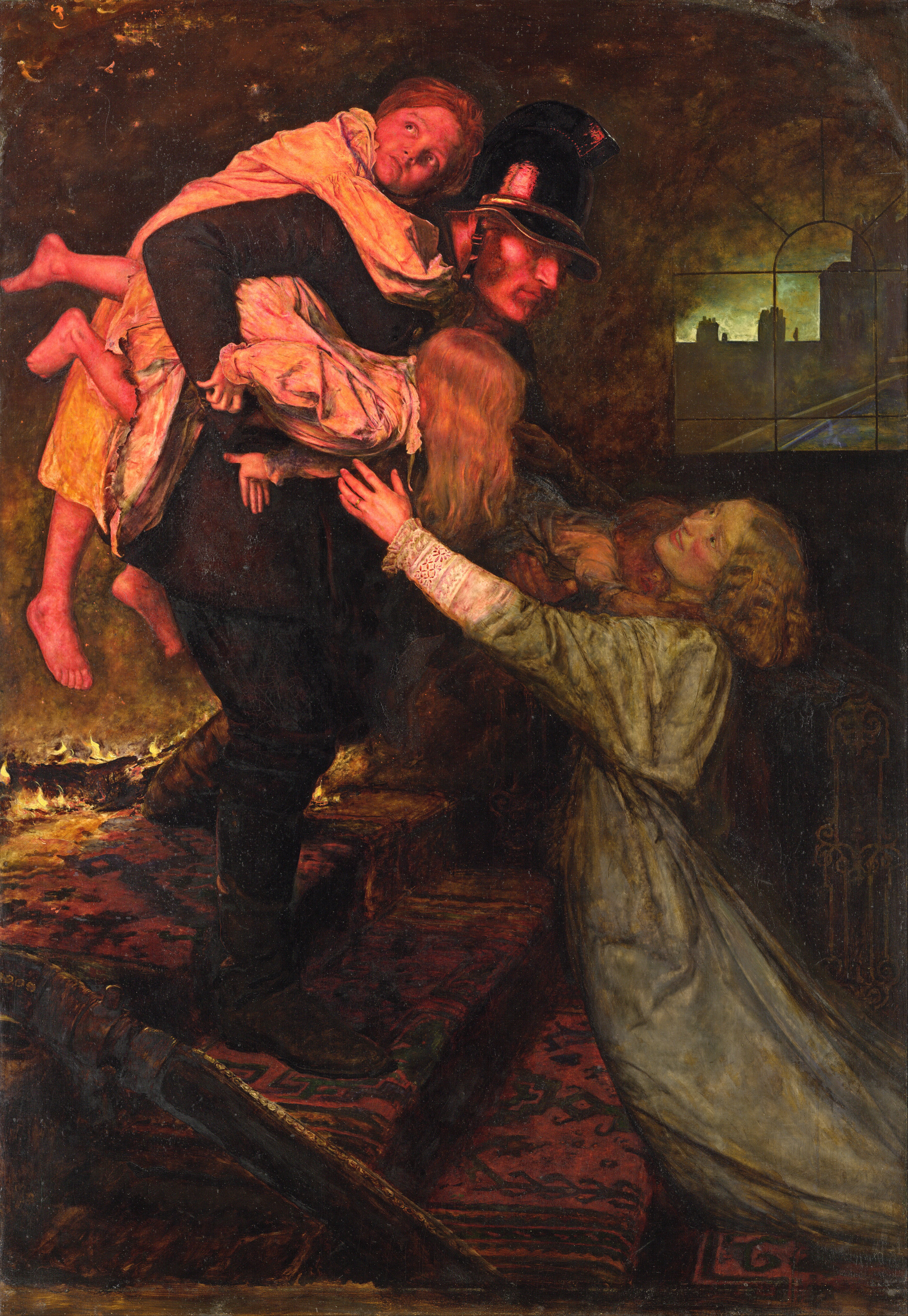
John Everett Millais, The Rescue, 1855

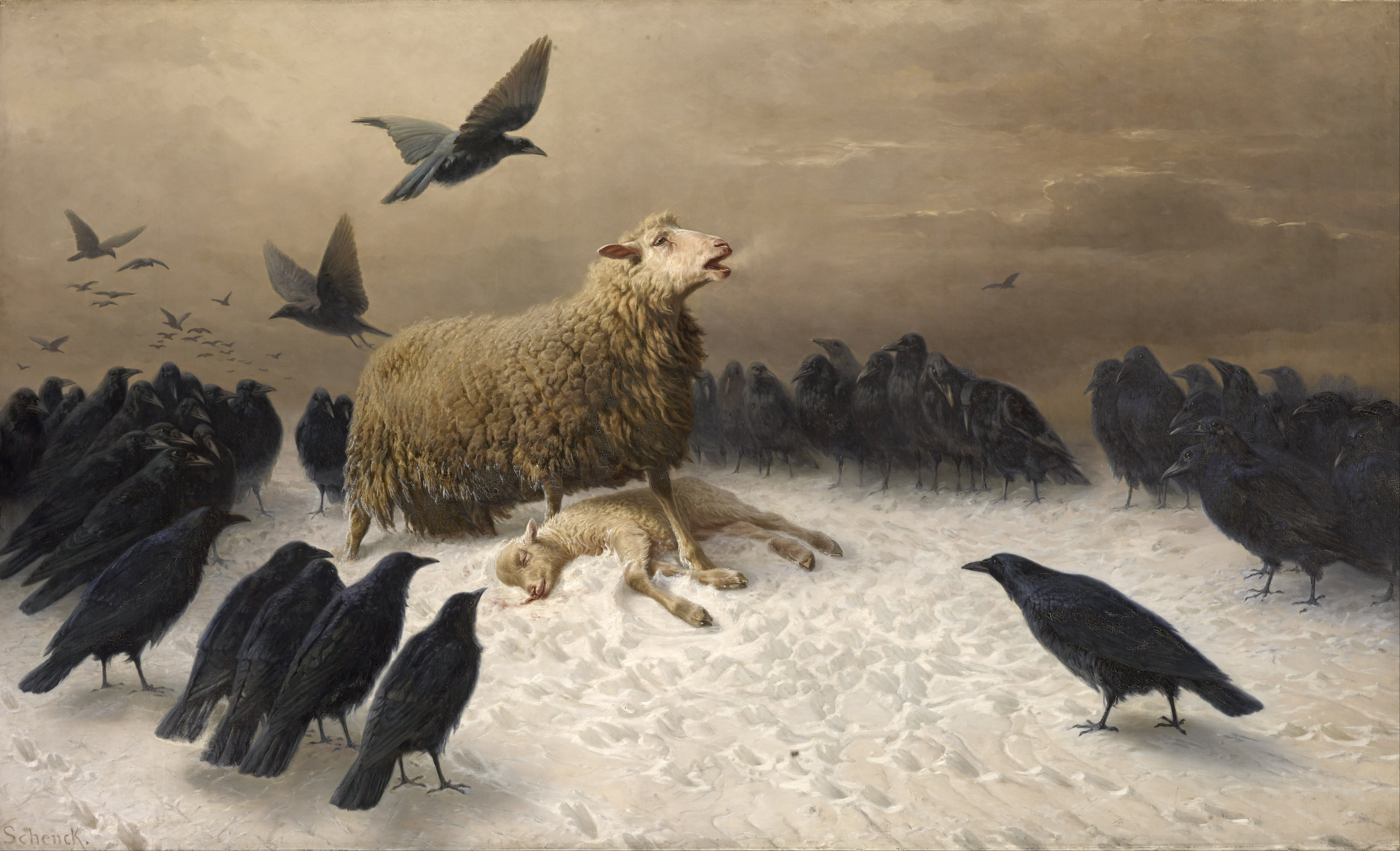
August Friedrich Schenck, Anguish, 1878

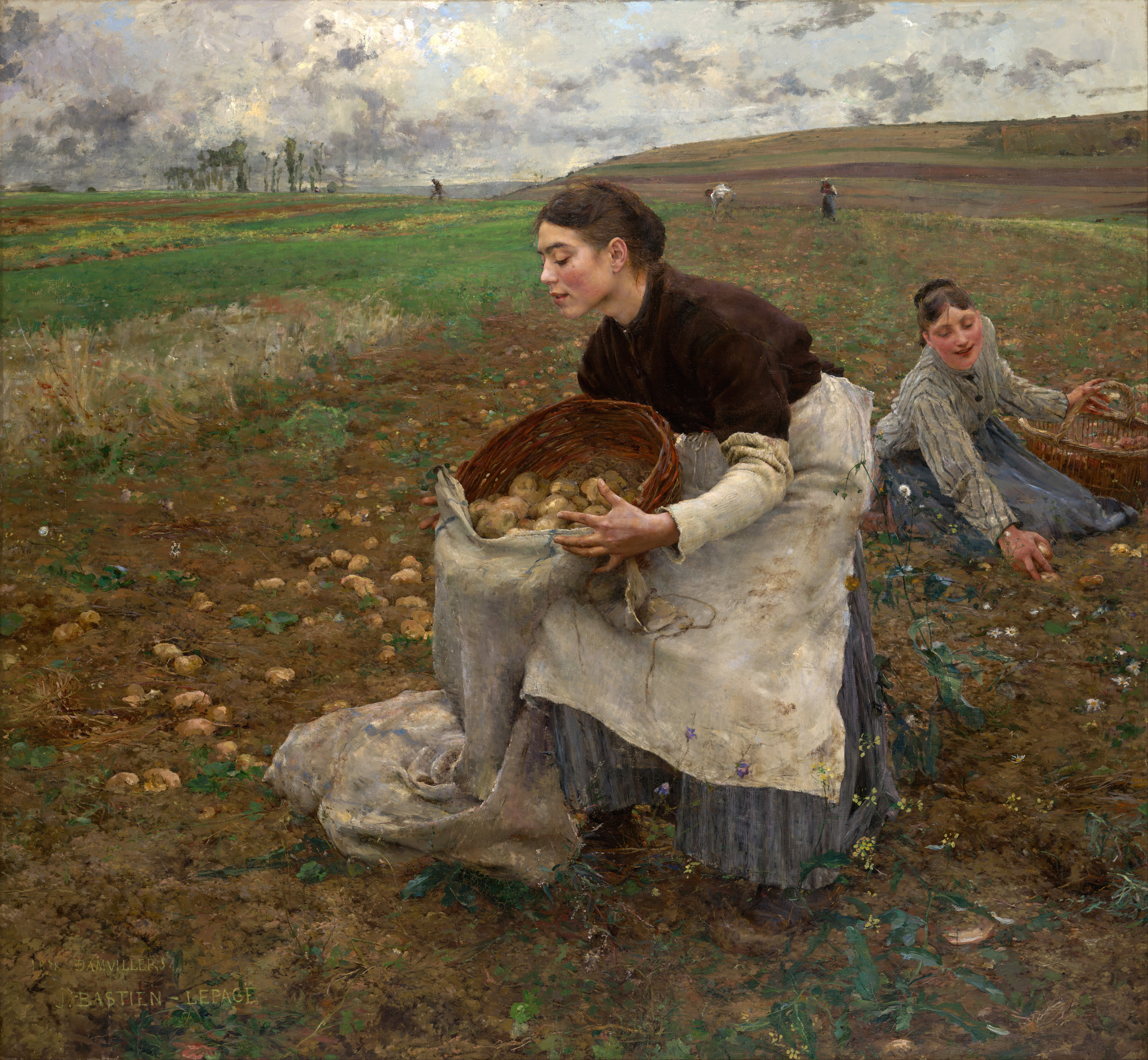
Jules Bastien-Lepage, October, 1878

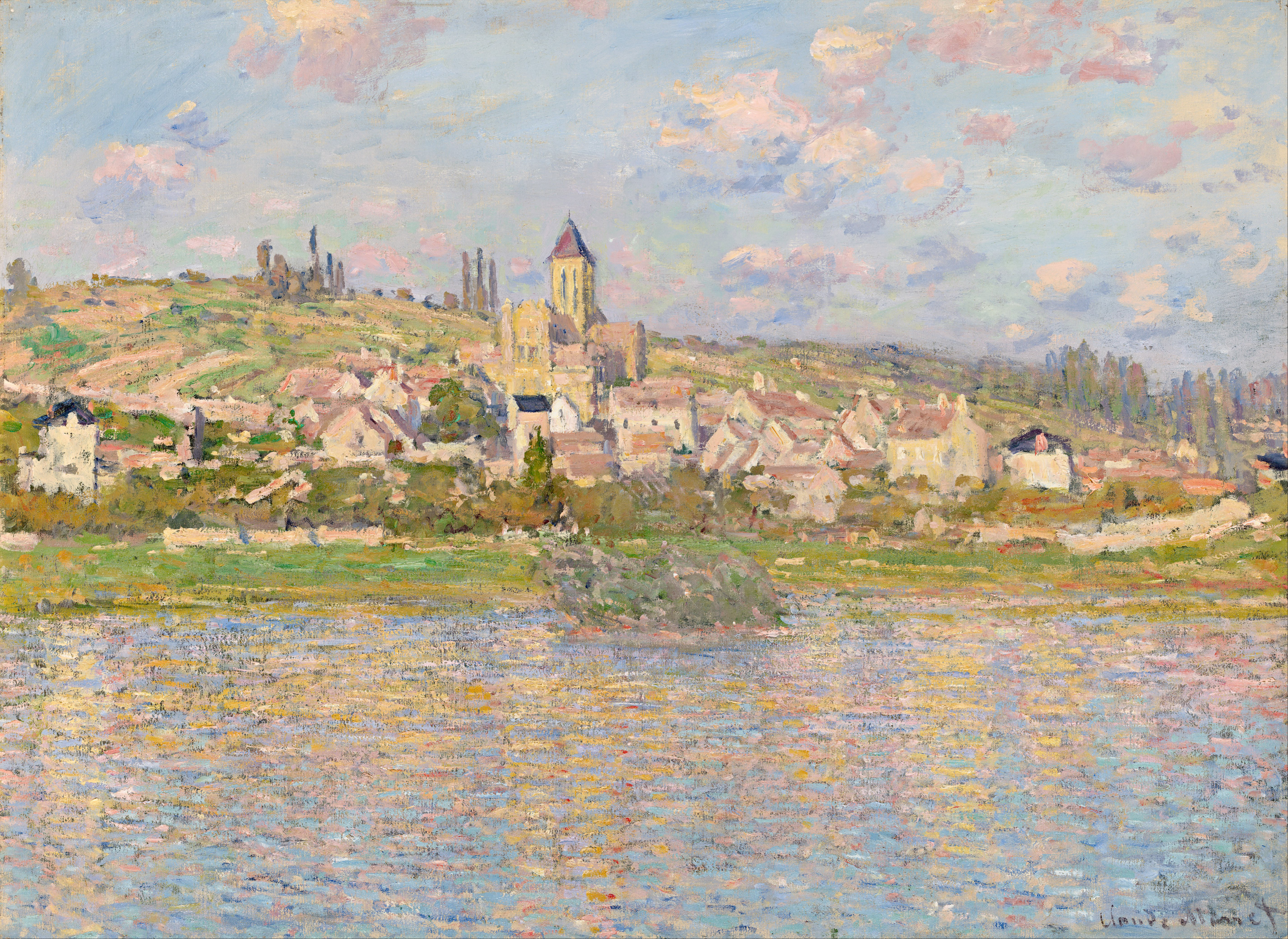
Claude Monet, Vétheuil, 1879

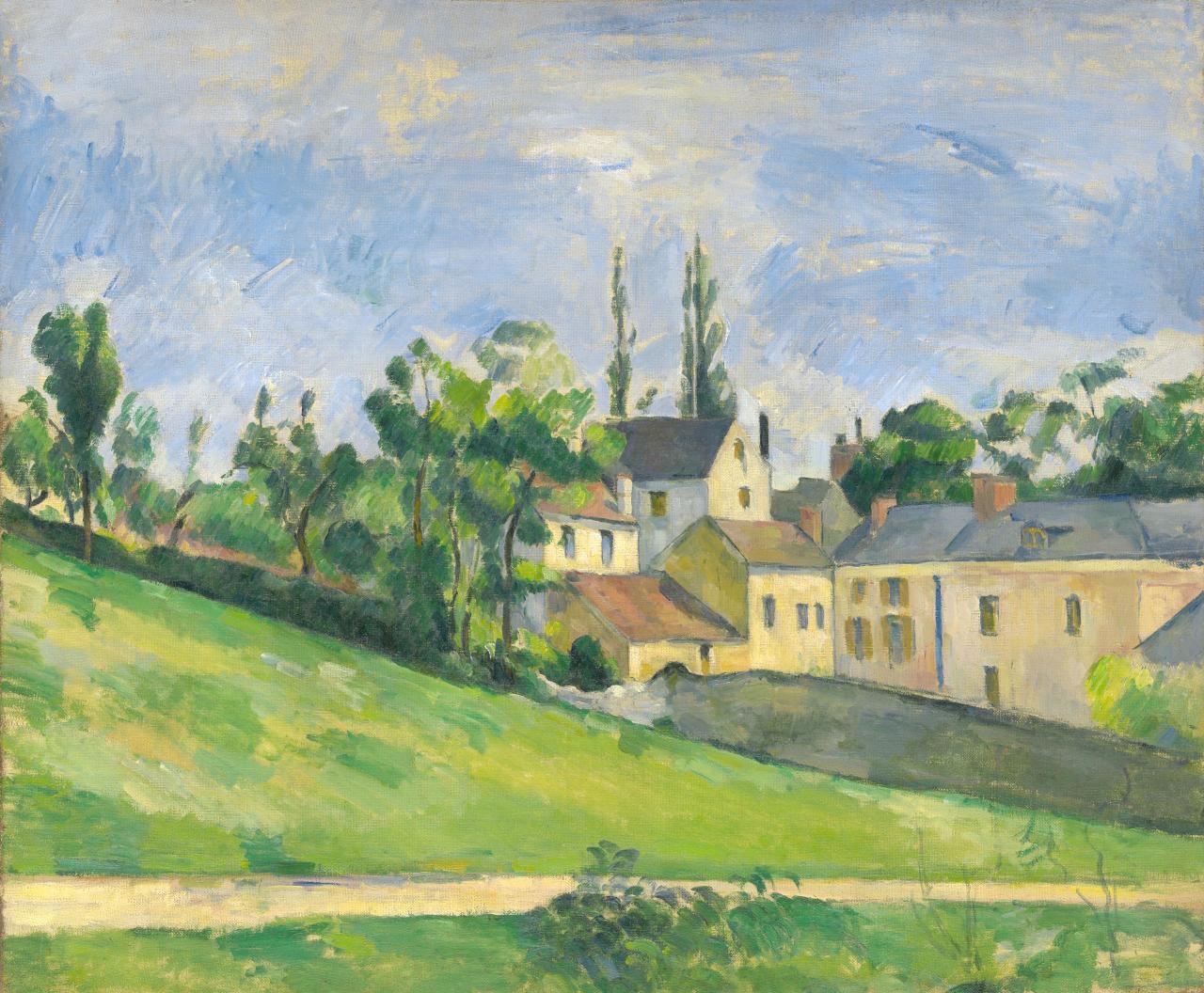
Paul Cézanne, The Uphill Road, 1881

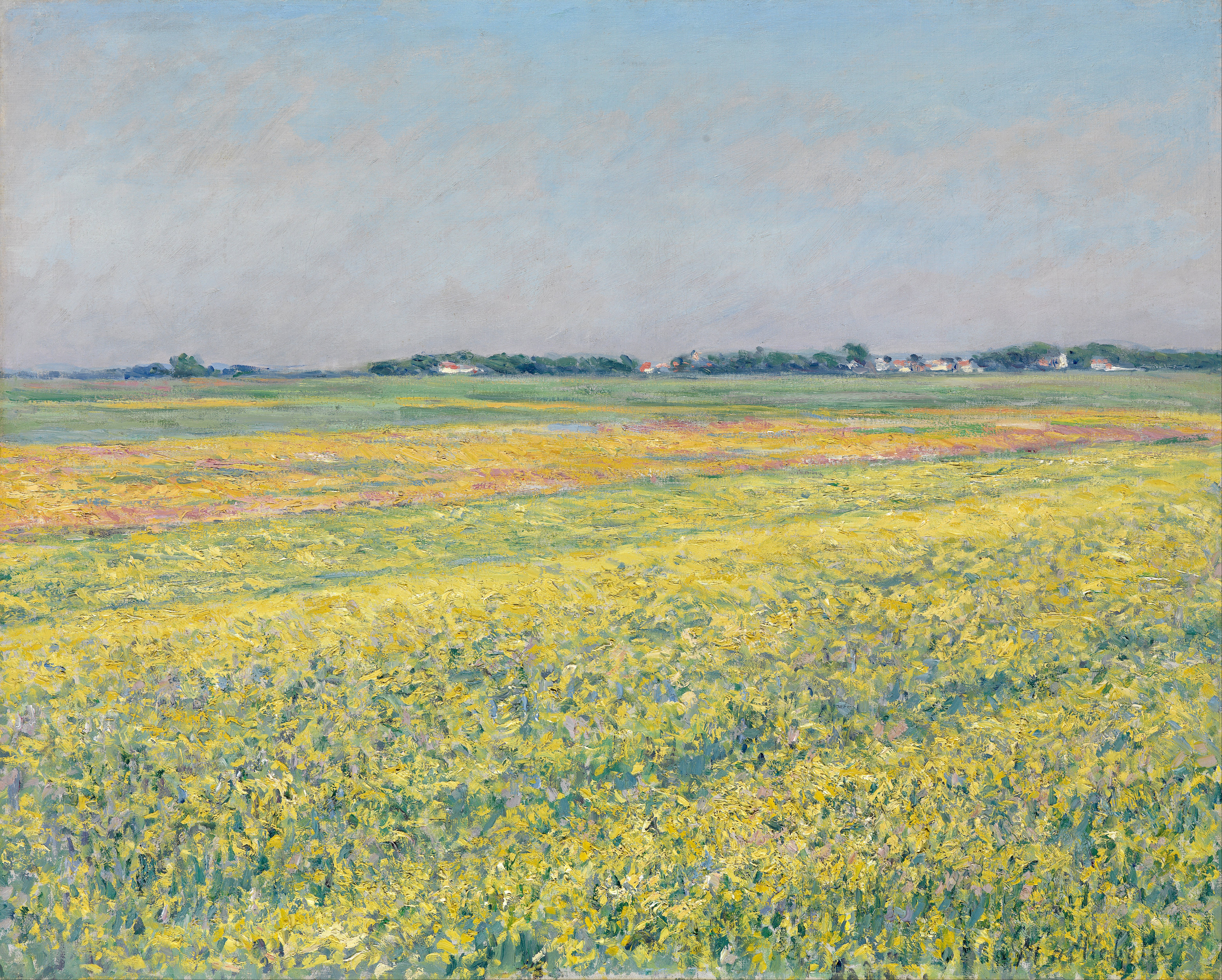
Gustave Caillebotte, The plain of Gennevilliers, yellow fields, 1884

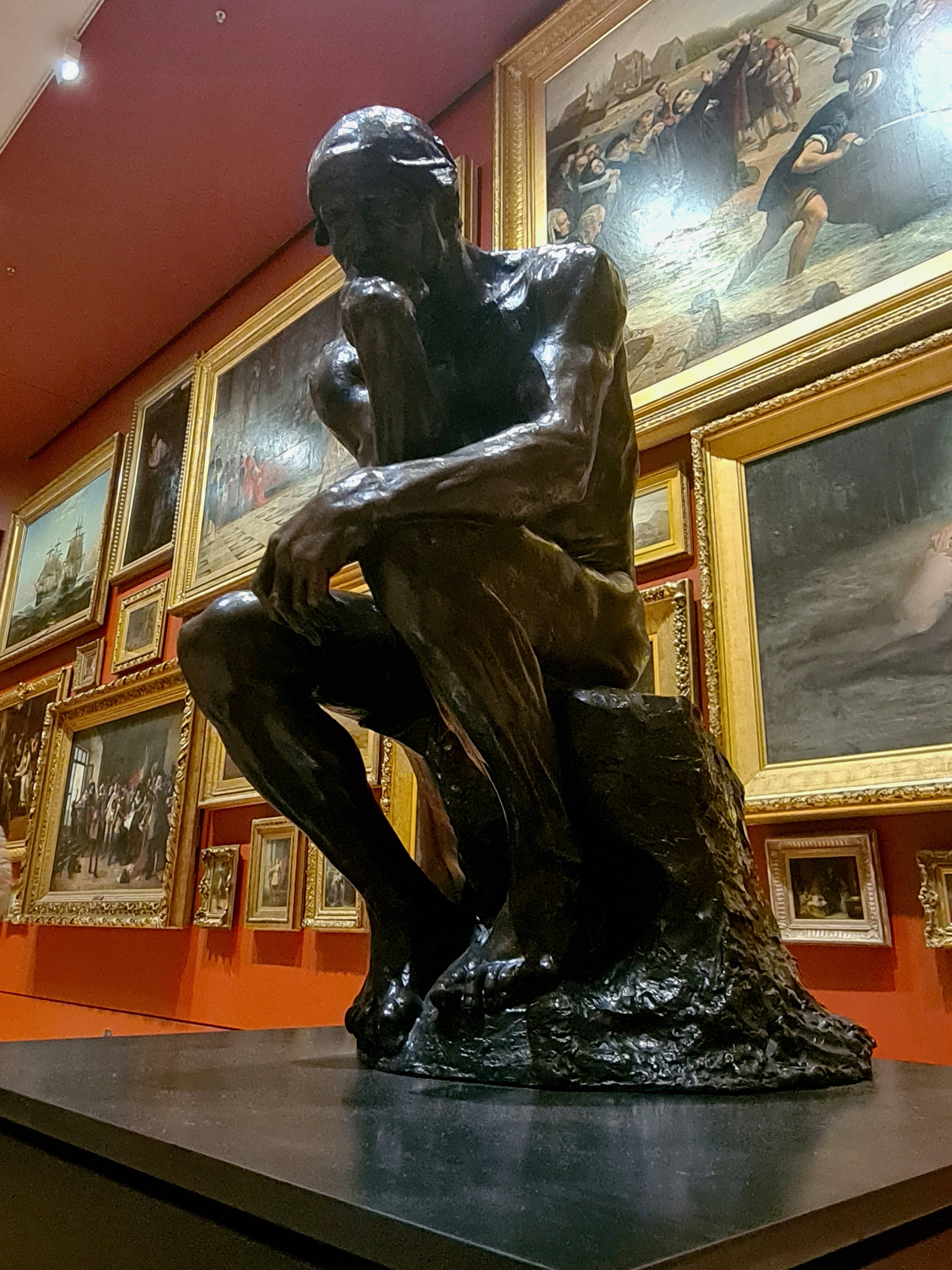
Auguste Rodin, The Thinker (first ever bronze cast), 1884

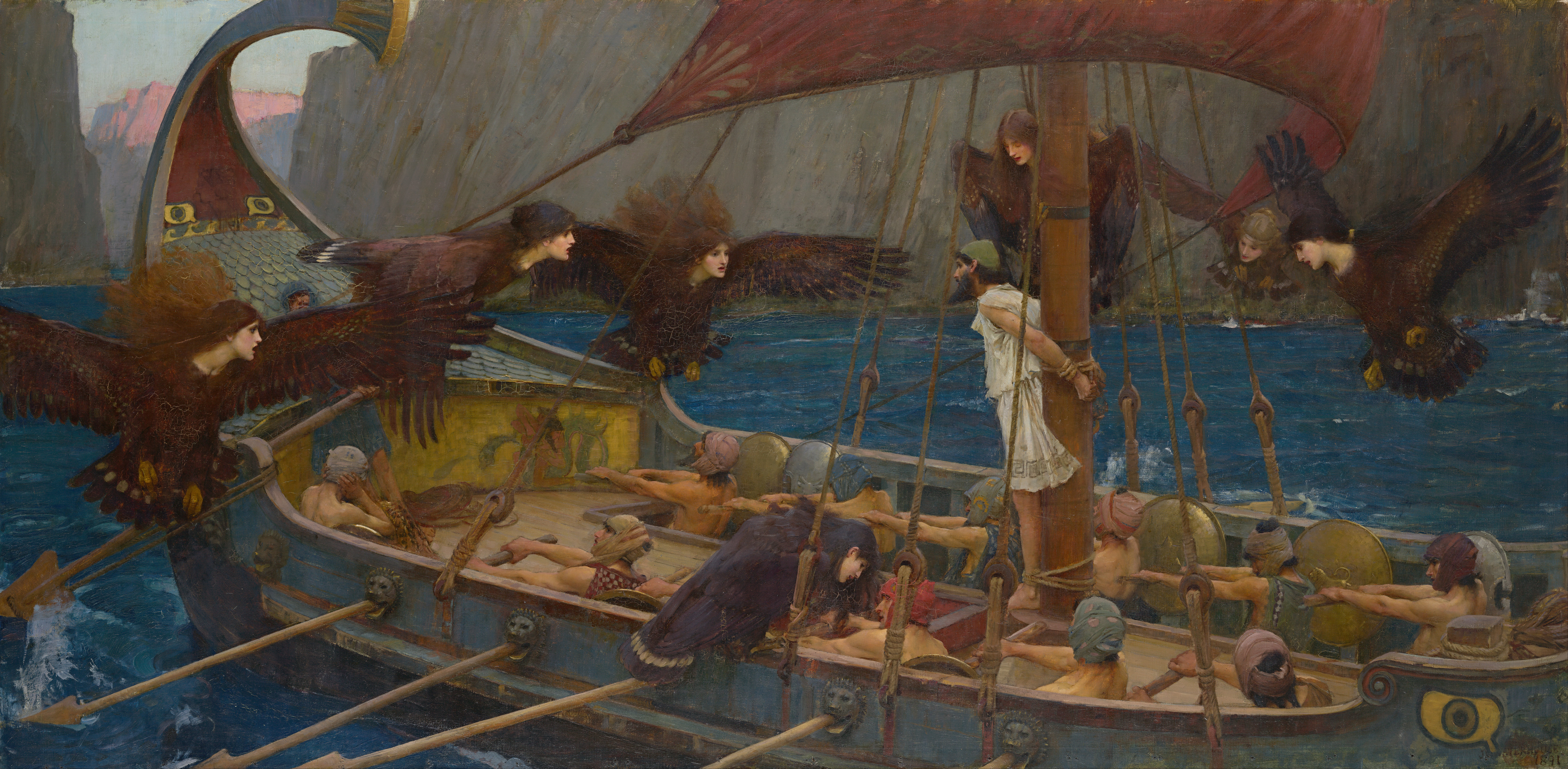
John William Waterhouse, Ulysses and the Sirens, 1891

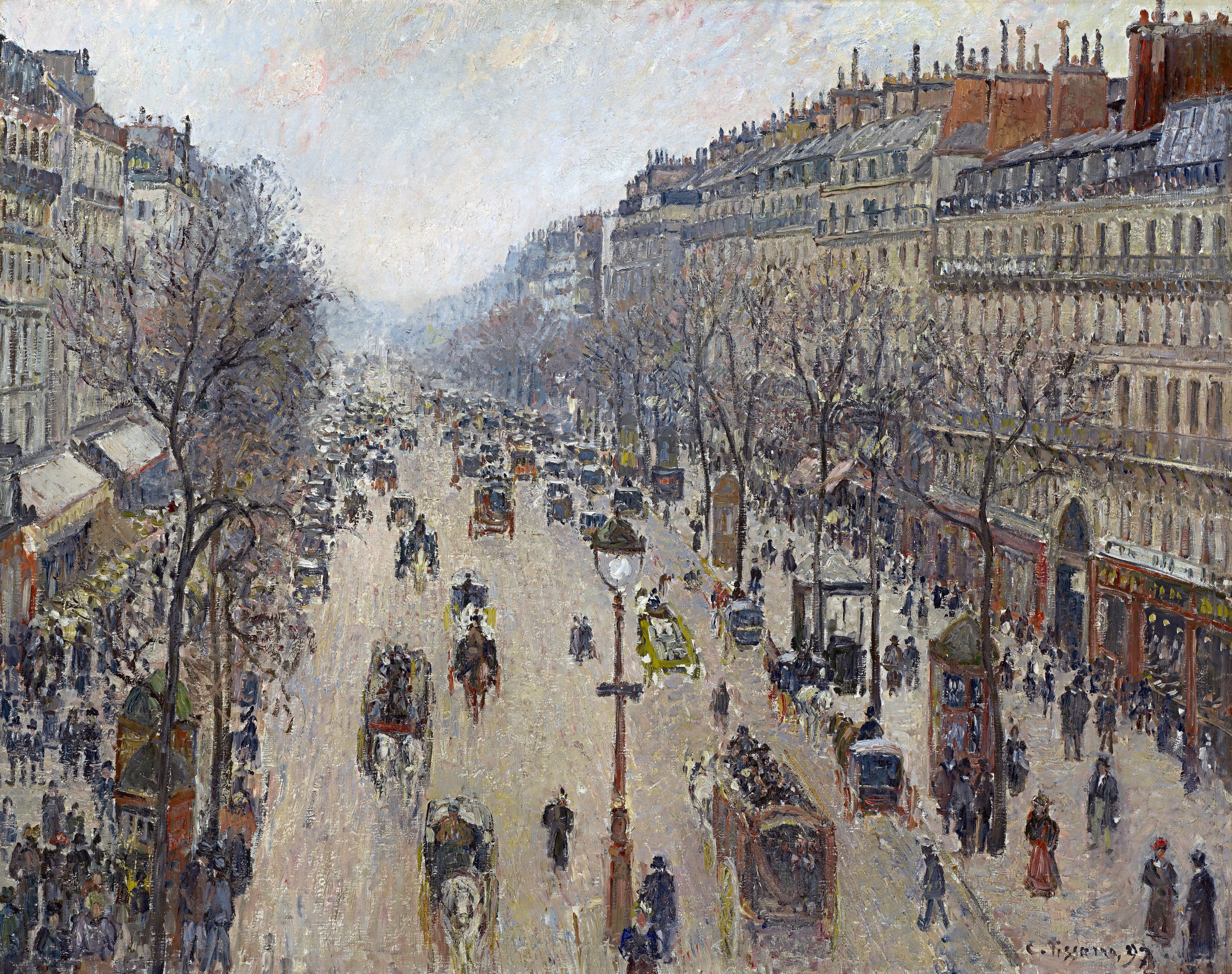
Camille Pissarro, Boulevard Montmartre, morning, cloudy weather, 1897

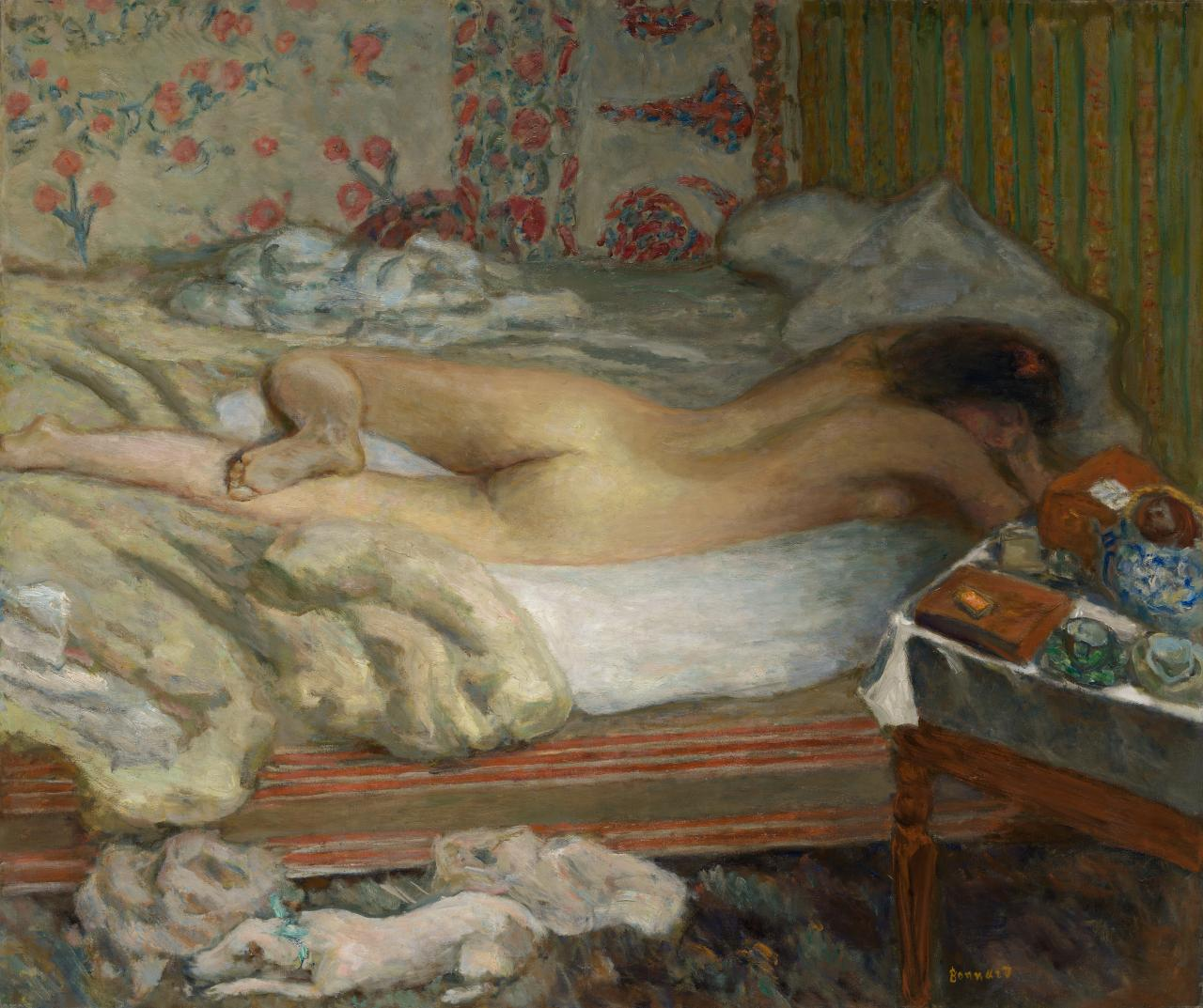
Pierre Bonnard, Siesta, 1900

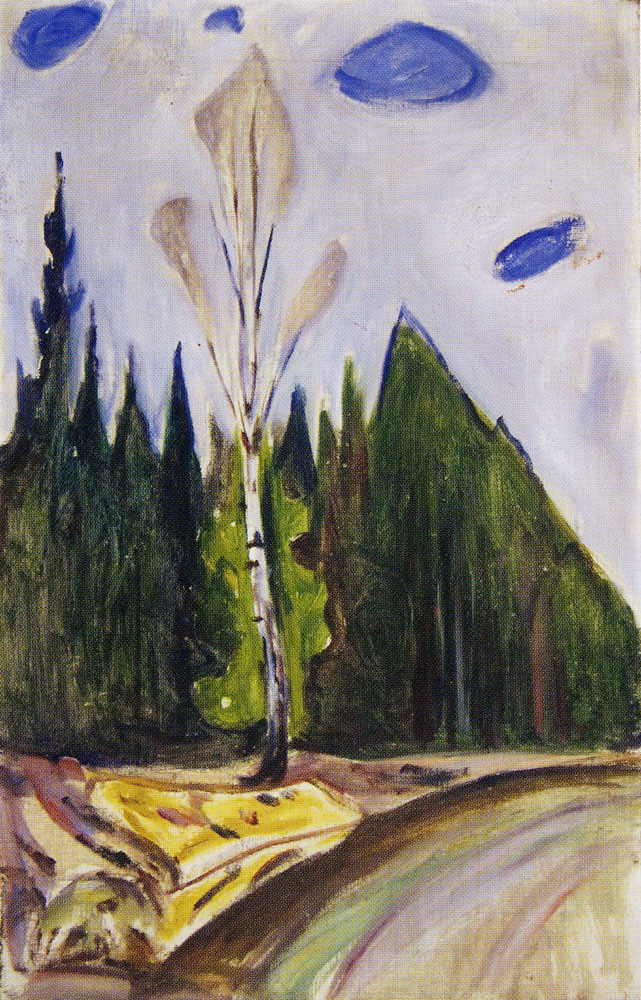
Edvard Munch, Early Spring, 1905

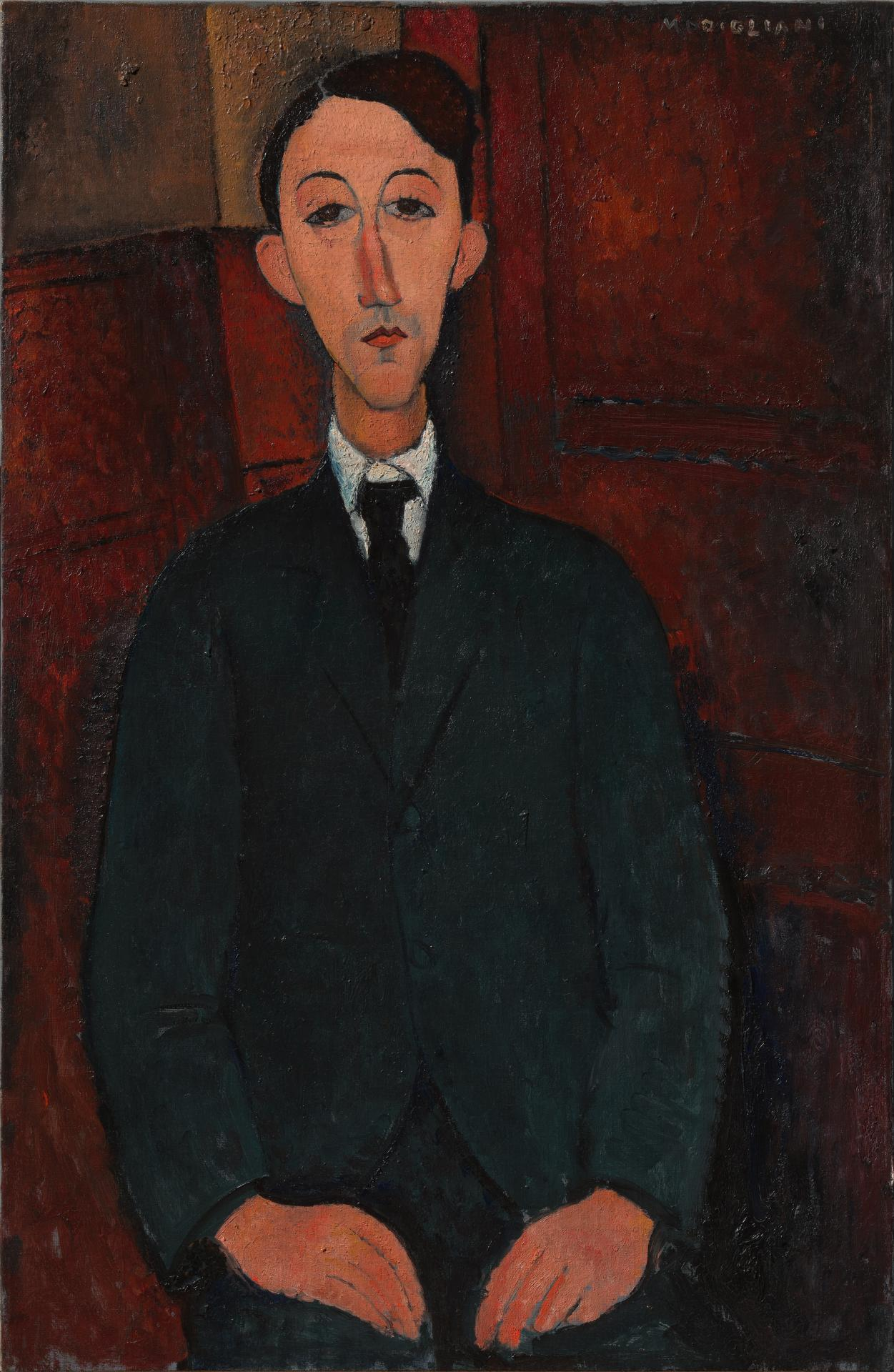
Amedeo Modigliani, Portrait of the painter Manuel Humbert, 1916

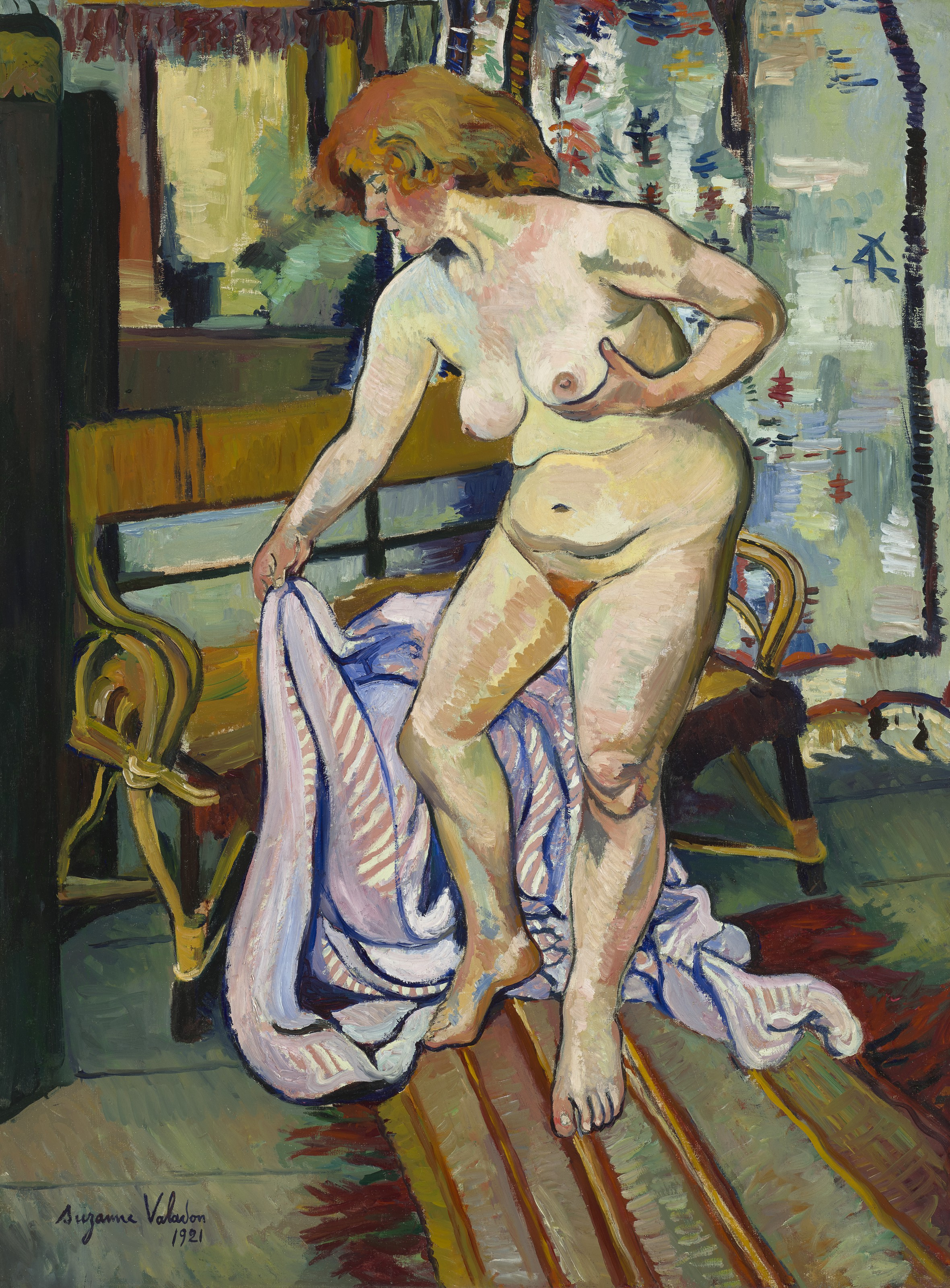
Suzanne Valadon, Nude with drapery, 1921

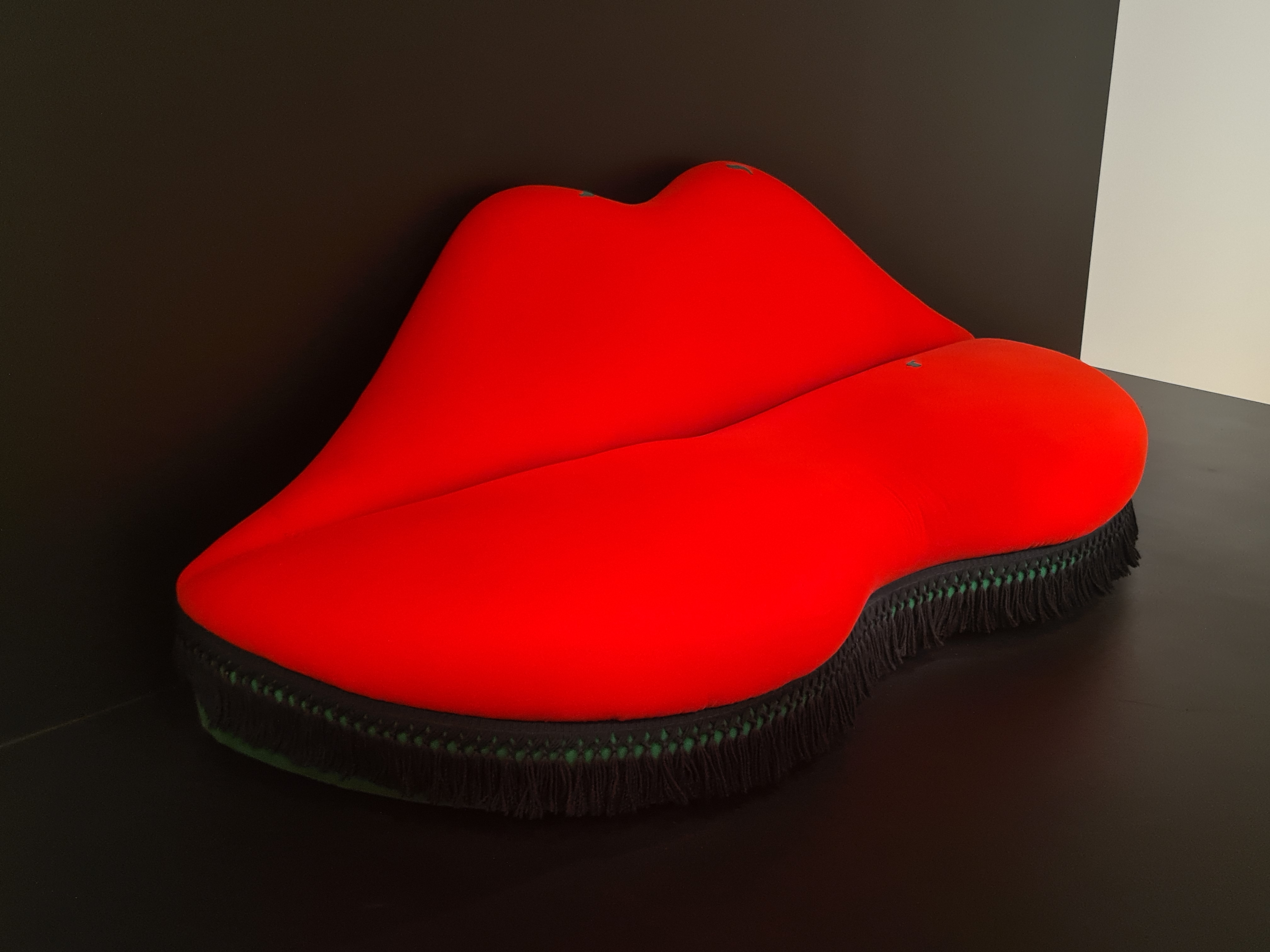
Salvador Dalí, Mae West Lips Sofa, 1937

=== Photography ===
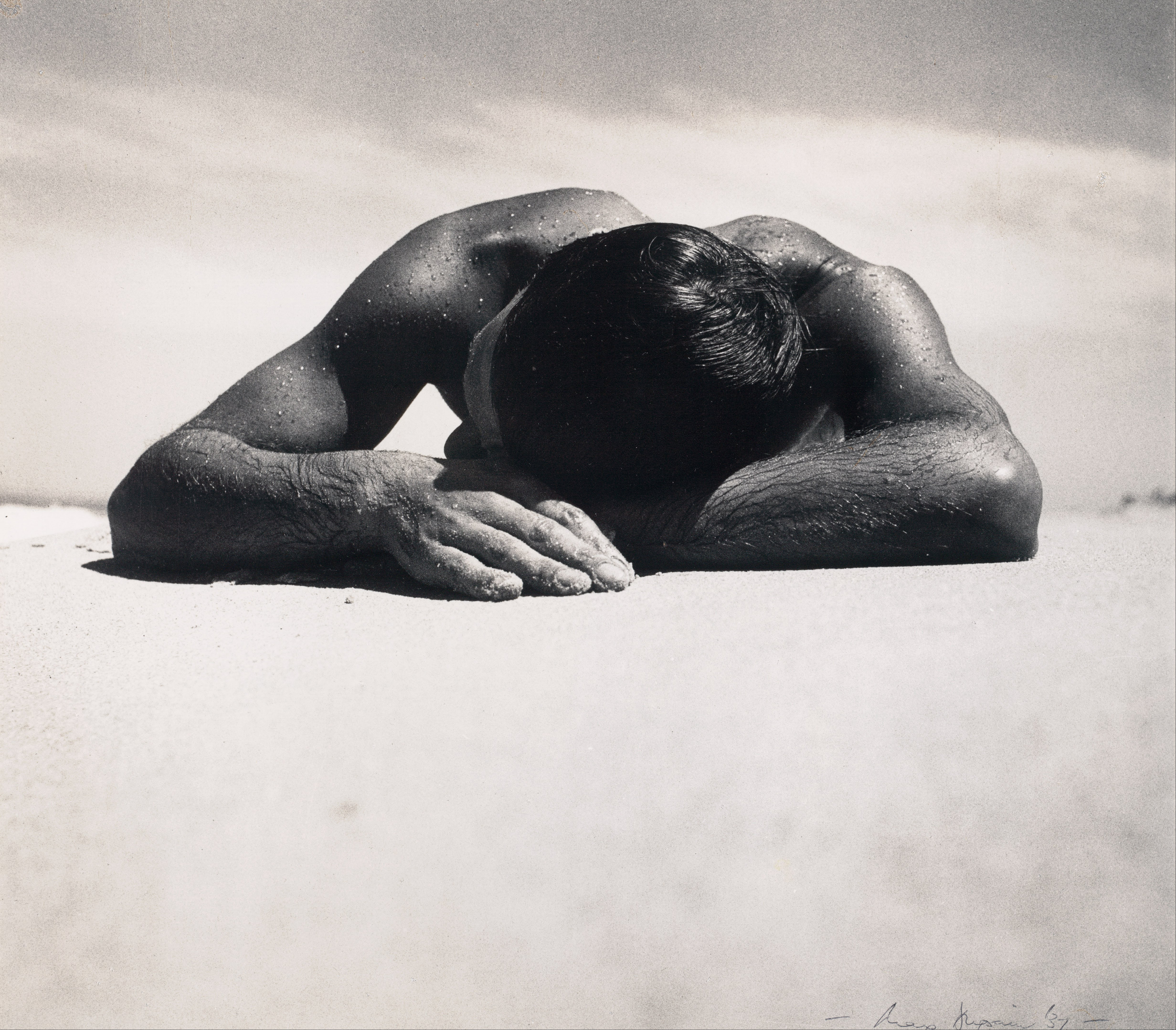
Max Dupain, Sunbaker, 1937

In 1967, the NGV established the first curatorial department dedicated to photography in an Australian public gallery, one of the first in the world. It now holds over 15,000 works. In that same year, the Gallery acquired the photography collection's first work, Surrey Hills street 1948 by David Moore and in 1969 the first international work was acquired, Nude 1939 by František Drtikol. The first photographer to exhibit solo at the NGV was Mark Strizic in 1968. Jennie Boddington, a filmmaker, was appointed first full-time curator of photography in 1972, possibly only the third such appointment amongst world public institutions.

=== Prints and drawings ===
The NGV's Department of Prints and Drawings is responsible for one third of the gallery's collection. Highlights among the department's holdings include one of the world's largest collections of engravings and woodcuts by Dürer. The NGV is also said to have one of the most impressive collections of works by William Blake, including 36 of the 102 watercolours he worked on up until his death in 1827 to illustrate the Divine Comedy by Dante, the largest number of works from this series held by any gallery in the world. Rembrandt and Goya are also well-represented, and the Australian collection contains a detailed account of the history of graphic arts in Australia.

The NGV no longer dedicates a space to exhibiting works from the Prints and Drawings collection, though some works on paper are rotated within the permanent collection galleries and may appear in exhibitions. Works in the collection may be viewed by appointment in the department's Print Study Room.

Selected works

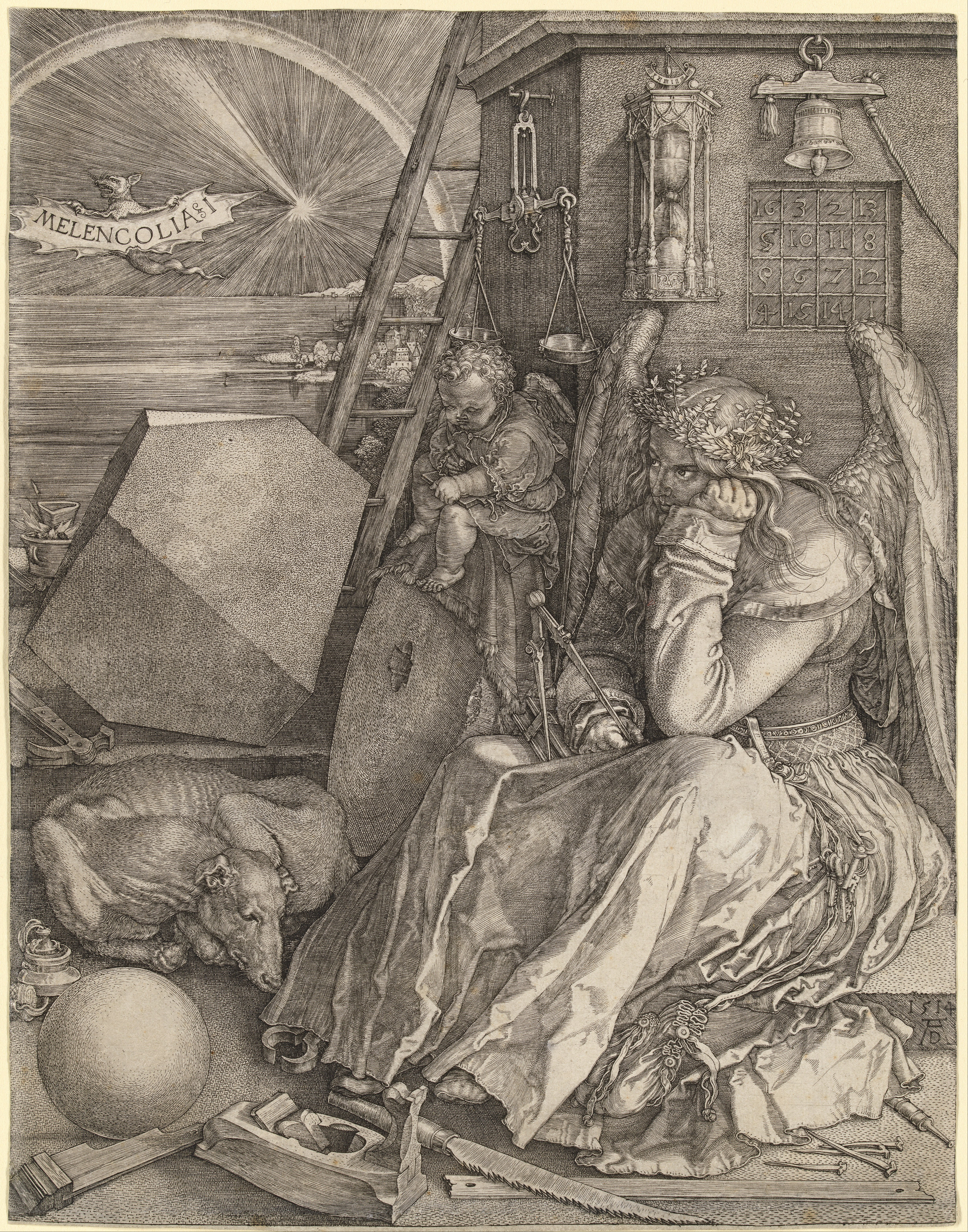
Albrecht Dürer, Melencolia I, 1514

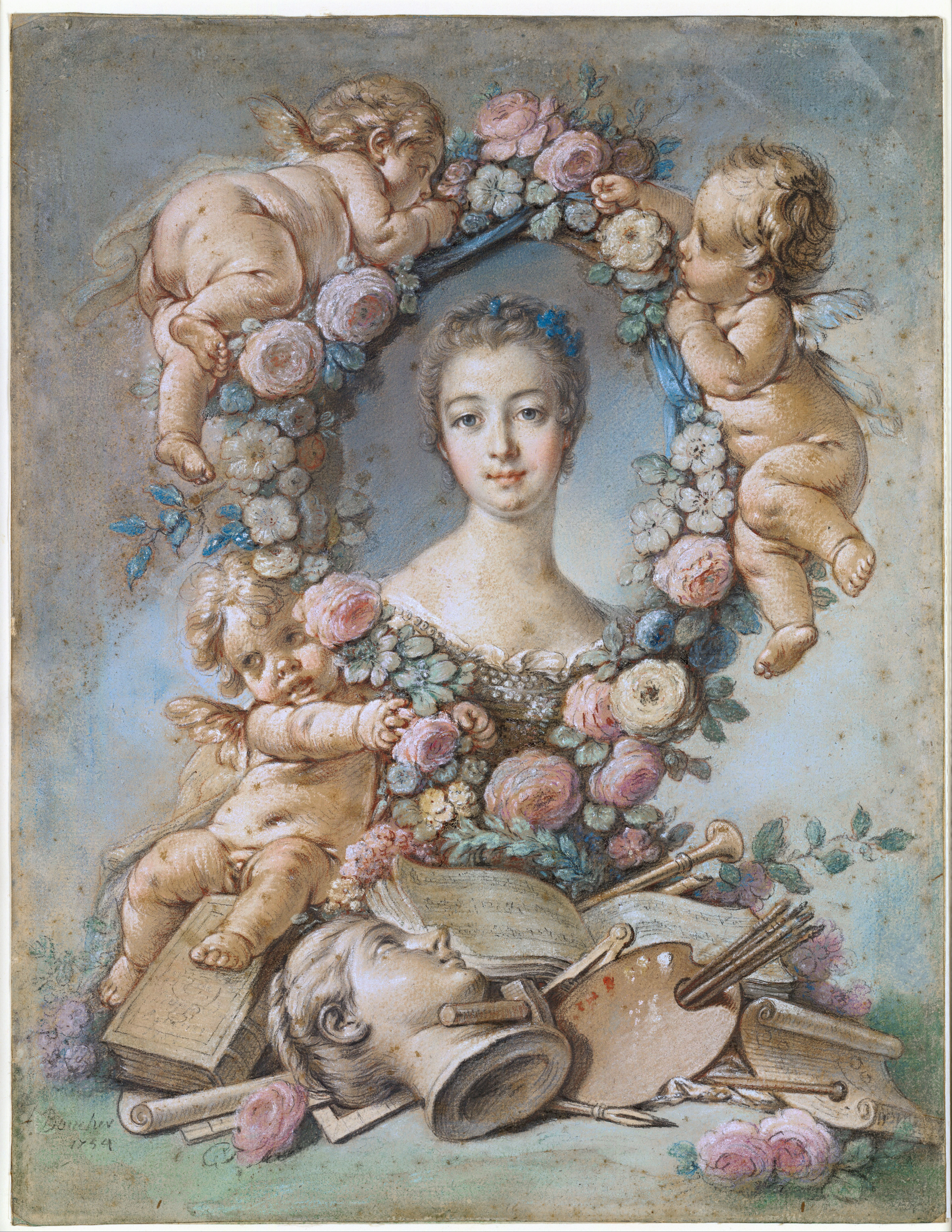
François Boucher, Madame de Pompadour, 1754

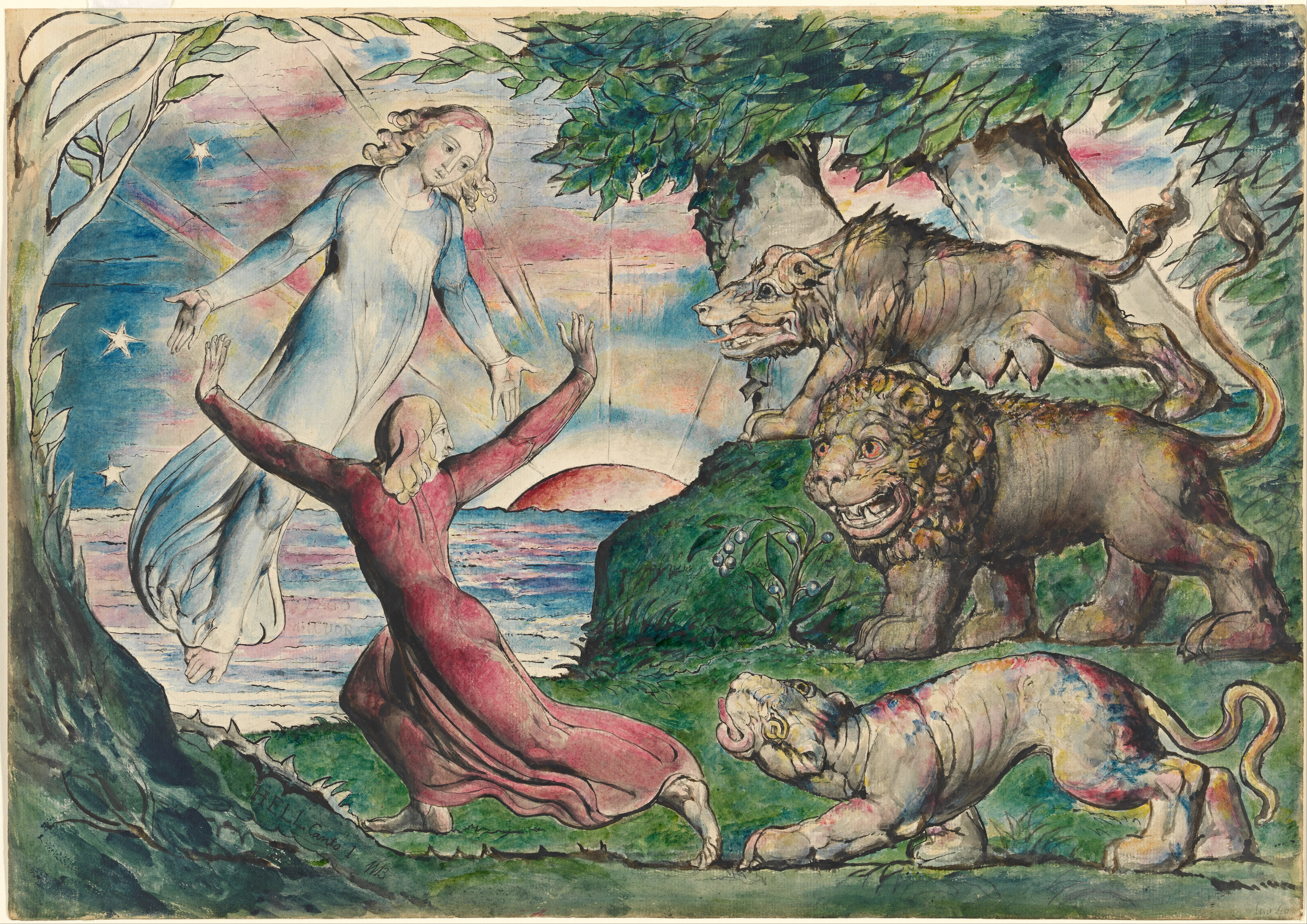
William Blake, Dante running from the three beasts, 1824

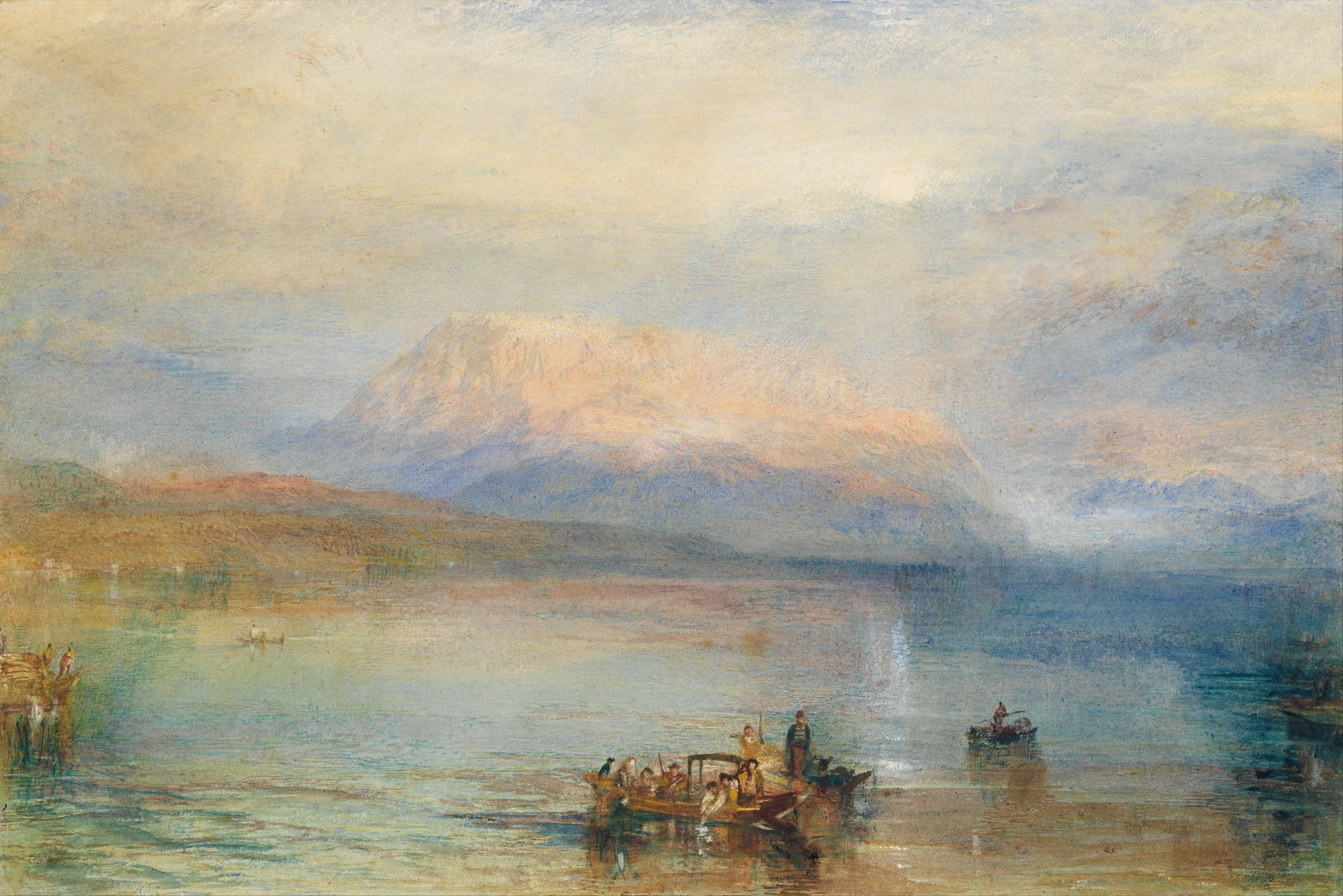
J. M. W. Turner, The Red Rigi, 1842

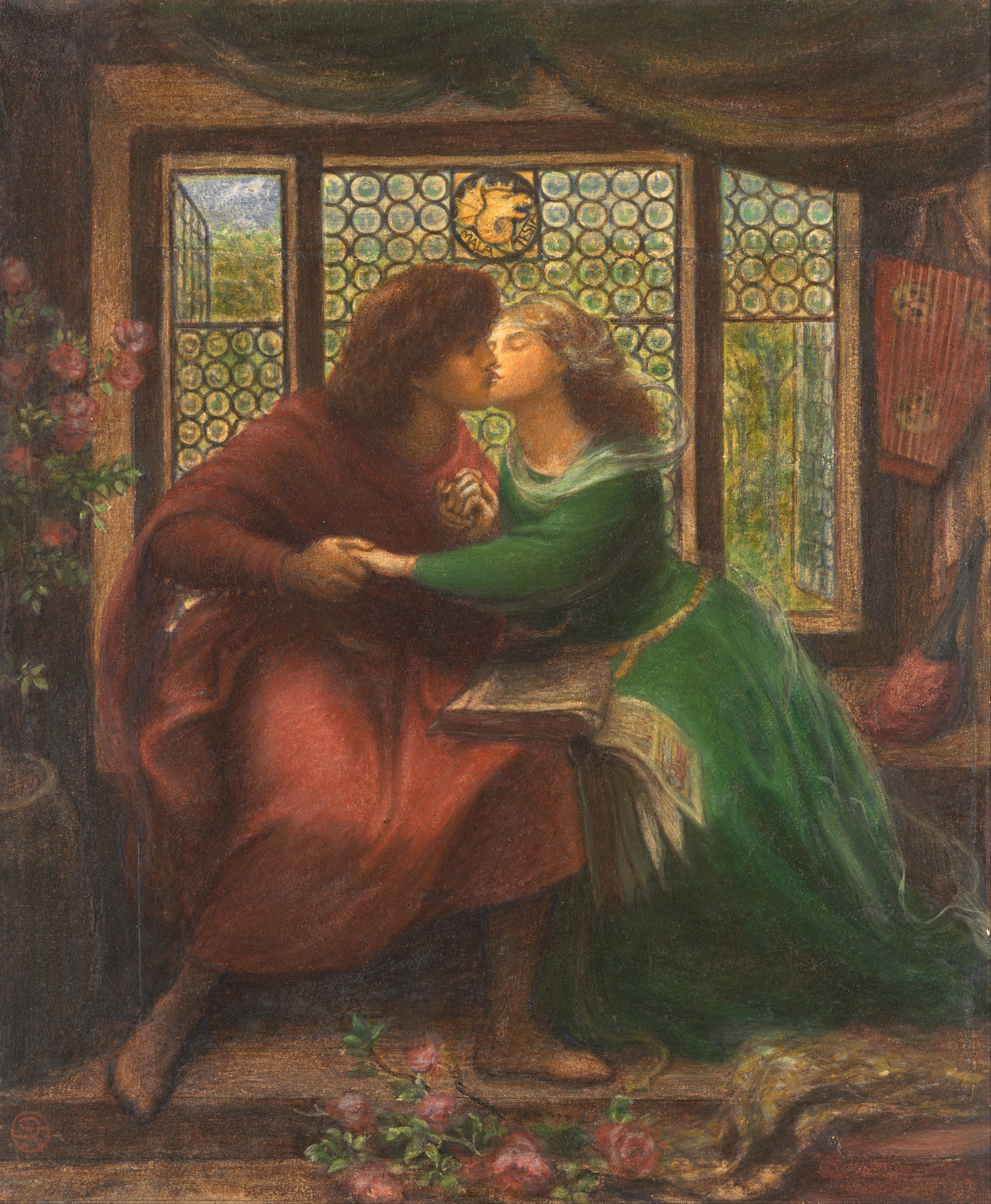
Dante Gabriel Rossetti, Paolo and Francesca da Rimini, 1867

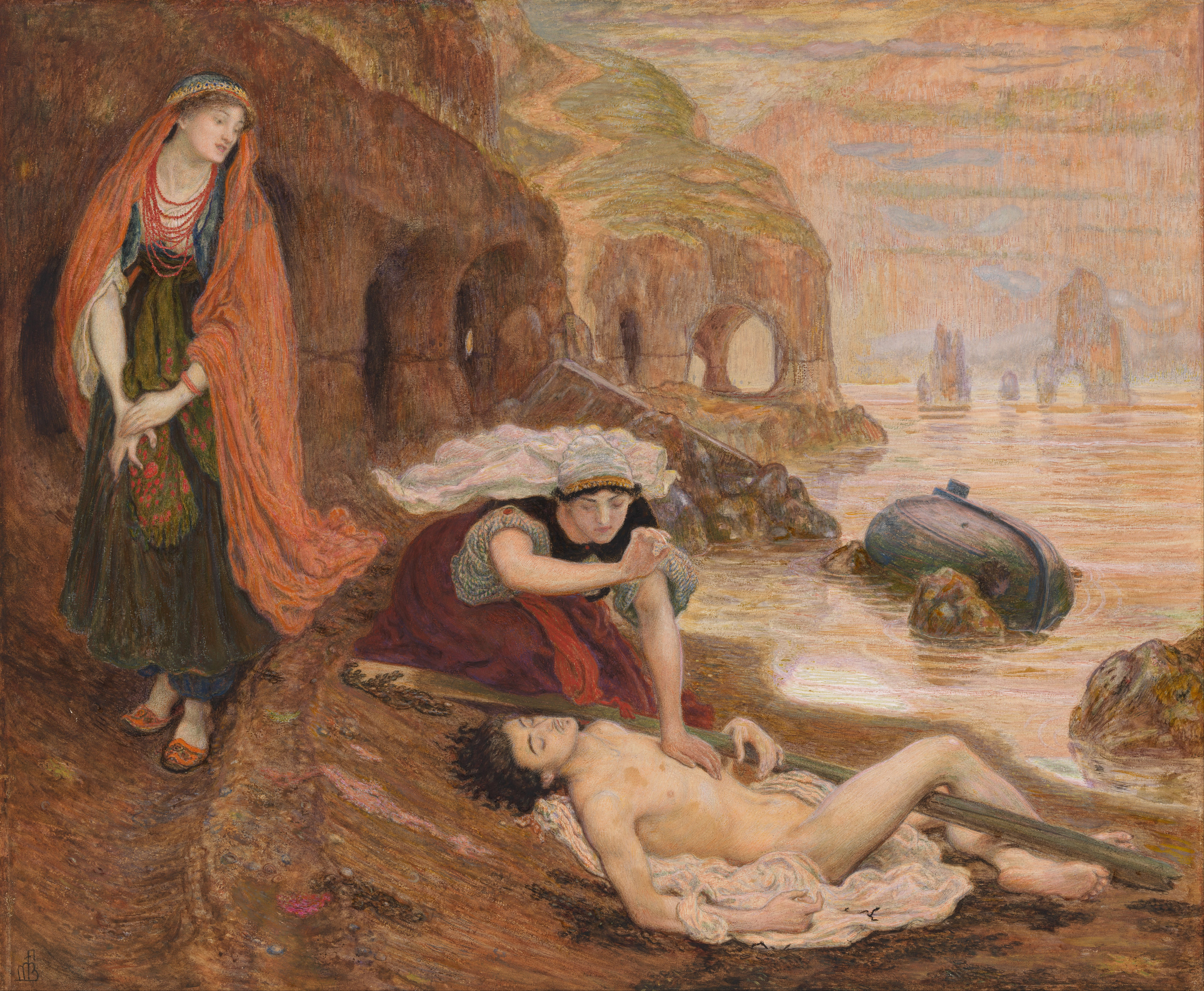
Ford Madox Brown, The finding of Don Juan by Haidée, 1869

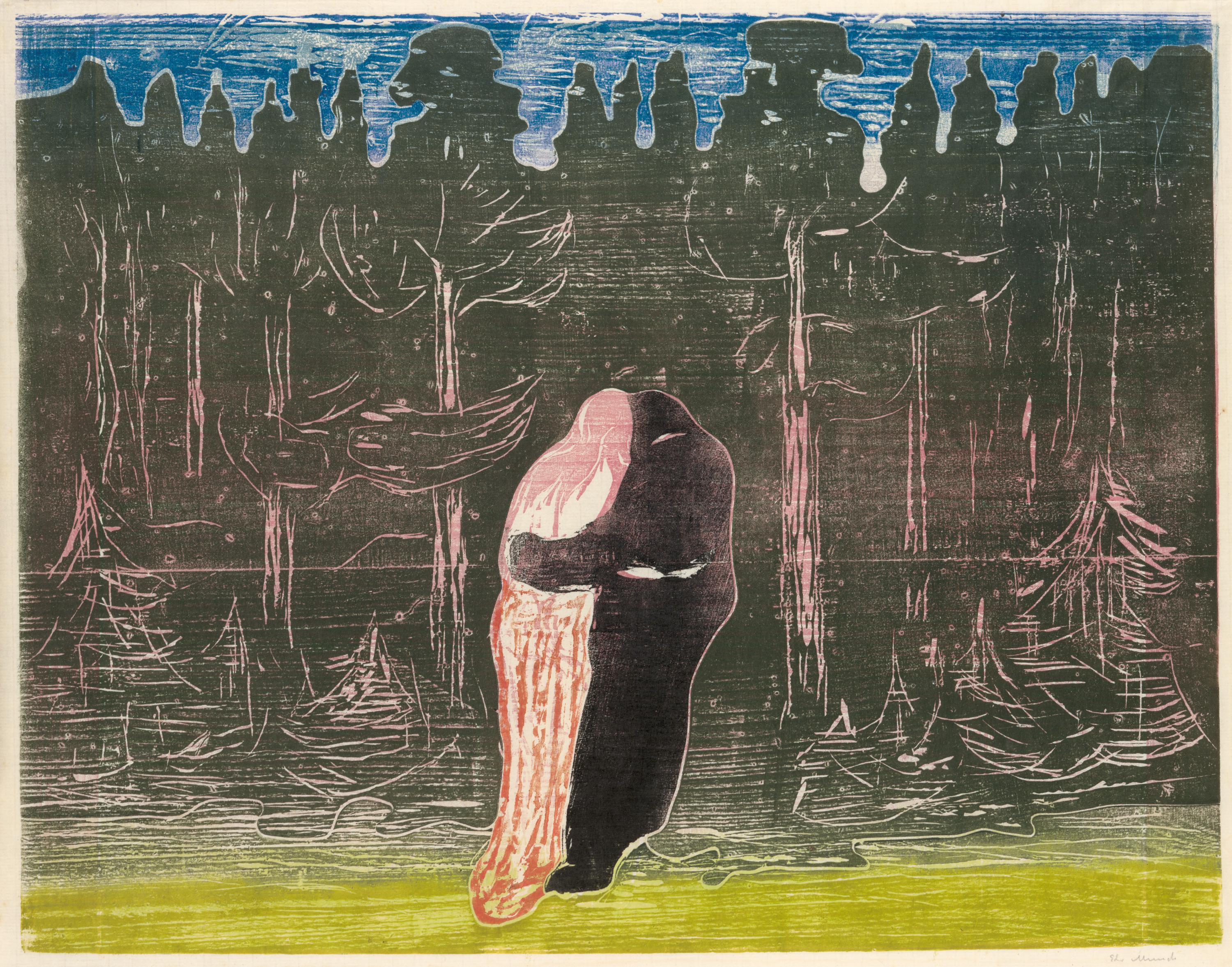
Edvard Munch, Towards the Forest II, 1897

== Controversies ==
=== As a "National Gallery" ===
When plans for the construction of the National Gallery of Australia in Canberra became firmly established in the 1960s, Australia's state galleries removed the word "national" from their names (for example, the National Gallery of New South Wales in Sydney became the Art Gallery of New South Wales). This naming convention dated back to the 19th century when Australia's colonies were self-governing political entities and had yet to federate. Only the NGV has retained "national" in its name. This has proven to be somewhat contentious, given that the NGV is technically not a national gallery, and occasionally there have been calls for it to follow the example of the other state galleries.

=== Withdrawal of Chloé ===
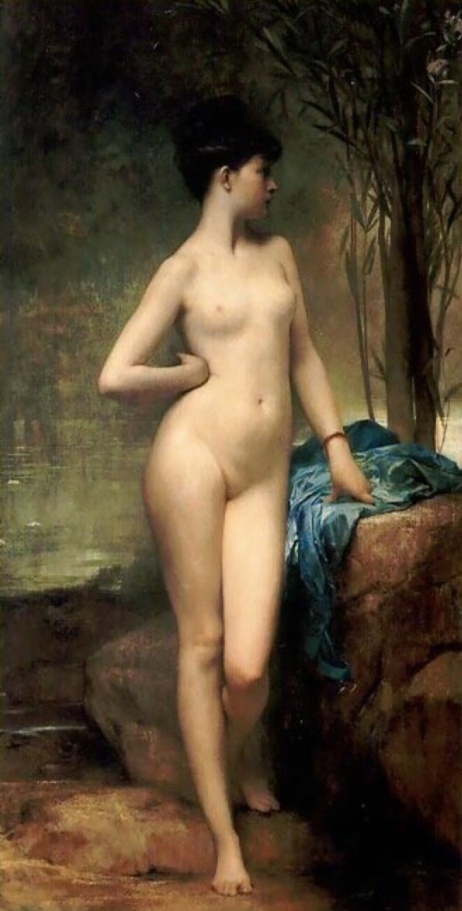
Chloé, 1875, Jules Joseph Lefebvre

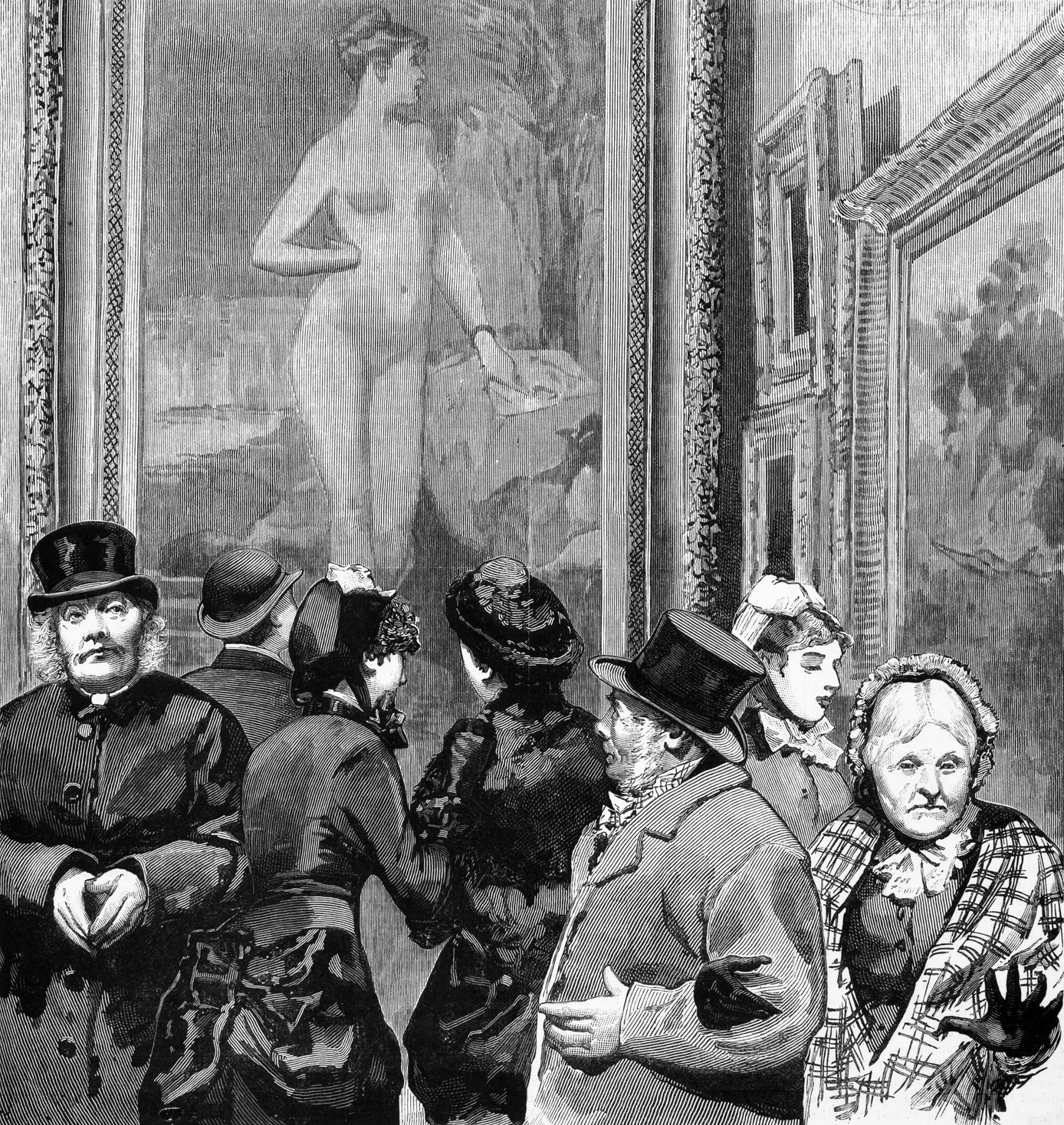
"A Question Of Propriety": Chloé on display at the gallery, 1883

In May 1883, when the National Gallery of Victoria opened on a Sunday for the first time, a public debate erupted over the propriety of displaying a female nude portrait on the Sabbath. The painting in question, French artist Jules Joseph Lefebvre's Chloé (1875), had been loaned to the gallery that month, and was "cautiously displayed in a dim corner". Nonetheless, Chloé became "Melbourne's femme fatale", and after three weeks of scandal, was withdrawn and hidden from the public. It eventually found a permanent home at Melbourne's Young and Jackson Hotel, down the road from the NGV on Swanston Street.

=== Slaughtered Cow happening ===
In 1975, painter and performance artist Ivan Durrant deposited a cow carcass in the NGV forecourt. Durrant later stated that it was part of a performance art piece intended to shock those who might be horrified by the death of the animal while also happy to consume meat. At the time, the NGV denounced the piece as a "sick and disgusting act".

=== Picasso theft ===
A famous event in the gallery's history occurred in 1986 with the theft of Pablo Picasso's painting The Weeping Woman (1936). A person or group identifying themselves as the "Australian Cultural Terrorists" claimed responsibility for the theft, stating that the painting was stolen in protest against the perceived poor treatment of the arts by the state government of the time. They sought as a ransom the establishment of an art prize for young artists. The painting was found undamaged in a railway locker two weeks later and returned to the gallery.

=== Piss Christ ===
During a retrospective of Andres Serrano's work at the NGV in 1997, the then Catholic Archbishop of Melbourne, George Pell, sought an injunction from the Supreme Court of Victoria to restrain the gallery from publicly displaying Piss Christ, which was not granted. Some days later, one patron attempted to remove the work from the gallery wall, and two teenagers later attacked it with a hammer. Gallery officials reported receiving death threats in response to Piss Christ. NGV Director Timothy Potts cancelled the show, allegedly out of concern for a Rembrandt exhibition that was also on display at the time. Supporters argued that the controversy over Piss Christ is an issue of artistic freedom and freedom of speech.

== Special exhibitions ==
An exhibition known as The Field opened the gallery's new premises on St Kilda Road in 1968. Reflecting the influence of abstract art, particularly New York-inspired hard edge and color field painting, it featured 74 works by forty (mostly emerging young) Australian painters and sculptors. Described as a radical departure from the gallery's more traditional program, it signified more broadly a growing internationalisation of the Australian art world. The NGV held an exhibition titled "The Field Revisited" in 2018 to mark its 50th anniversary.

=== Melbourne Winter Masterpieces ===
The NGV has held several large exhibitions known as Melbourne Winter Masterpieces exhibitions, starting with Impressionists: Masterpieces from the Musee d'Orsay in 2004.

| Year | Duration | Exhibition title | Attendance | Notable works and information |
|---|---|---|---|---|
| 2004 | 17 June – 26 September | Impressionists: Masterpieces from the Musée d'Orsay | 371,000 | An additional exhibition of Caravaggio paintings was also held in 2004 |
| 2005 | 24 June – 2 October | Dutch Masters from the Rijksmuseum, Amsterdam | 219,000 | Vermeer's painting Woman Reading a Letter was exhibited, the first time a Vermeer painting had been exhibited in Australia |
| 2006 | 30 June – 8 October | Picasso: Love and War 1935–1945 | 224,000 | Over 300 Picasso drawings and paintings from 1935 to 1945, curated by Anne Baldassari, Director of the Musée Picasso, Paris |
| 2007 | 30 June – 7 October | Guggenheim Collection 1940s to now | 180,000 | More than 85 works by 68 artists, mainly from the Solomon R. Guggenheim Museum, New York City, but also from other Guggenheim Museums in Venice, Bilbao, and Berlin. The exhibition did not travel to any other city |
| 2008 | 28 June – 5 October | Art Deco 1910—1939 | 241,000 | Organised by the Victoria and Albert Museum, London |
| 2009 | 13 June – 4 October | Salvador Dalí Liquid Desire | 333,000 | |
| 2010 | 19 June – 10 October | European Masters: Städel Museum, 19th–20th Century | 200,000 | |
| 2011 | 13 June – 4 October | Vienna Art and Design | 172,000 | |
| 2012 | 2 June – 7 October | Napoleon: Revolution to Empire | 189,000 | |
| 2013 | 10 May – 8 September | Monet's Garden: The Musée Marmottan Monet, Paris | 342,000 | |
| 2014 | 16 May – 31 August | Italian Masterpieces from Spain's Royal Court, Museo del Prado | 153,000 | |
| 2015 | 31 July – 8 November | Masterpieces from the Hermitage: The Legacy of Catherine the Great | 172,000 | Exhibition featured pieces by Rembrandt, Rubens, Velazquez, Van Dyck and others |
| 2016 | 24 June – 18 September | Degas: A New Vision | 197,500 | |
| 2017 | 28 April – 12 July | Van Gogh and the Seasons | 462,262 | Exhibition recorded a total attendance figure of 462,262, making it the most popular ticketed art exhibition ever presented in Victoria, and the most successful ticketed exhibition in the gallery's 156-year history. The exhibition is credited for generating almost $56 million for the Victorian economy. |
| 2018 | 9 June – 7 October | MoMA: 130 Years of Modern and Contemporary Art | 404,034 | Exhibition in partnership with the Museum of Modern Art in New York City. Includes over 200 key works arranged into eight chronological and thematic sections. The exhibition concluded with a total attendance figure, of 404,034, making it the NGV's second most attended ticketed exhibition on record. |
| 2019 | 24 May – 13 October | Terracotta Warriors and Cai Guo-Qiang | 377,105 | The exhibition included a large-scale presentation of China's first emperor's Terracotta Warriors presented alongside an exhibition of new, commissioned works by Chinese contemporary artist Cai Guo-Qiang. The exhibition include 150 historical Chinese artefacts, eight terracotta warriors, two full-sized horses and two replica bronze chariots of Zhou, Qin, Han dynasties, which were lent by Shaanxi History Museum in Xi'an and many other Chinese institutes. |
| 2020 | N/A | N/A | | The 2020 Winter Masterpieces exhibition was to be a presentation of works by French post-impressionist painter Pierre Bonnard. Due to the COVID-19 pandemic, this exhibition was delayed until 2023. |
| 2021 | 4 June – 3 October | French Impressionism: From the Museum of Fine Arts, Boston | | The exhibition included 100 impression works from the Museum of Fine Arts in Boston, including 79 works that had never been exhibited in Australia. Due to the COVID-19 Pandemic, this exhibition closed weeks after opening and could not reopen. |
| 2022 | 10 June – 9 October | The Picasso Century | 314,238 | The 2022 Winter Masterpiece exhibition is a career retrospective of Pablo Picasso, developed for the NGV by the Centre Pompidou and the Musée Picasso Paris. It features 70 works by Picasso alongside 100 works by his contemporaries and influences, drawn from French collections. The exhibition contributed $91 million to the Victorian economy, making it the exhibition with the highest economic impact in the history of the Melbourne Winter Masterpieces series. |
| 2023 | 6 June – 8 October | Pierre Bonnard: Designed by India Mahdavi | 157,317 | |
| 2024 | 14 June – 6 October | Pharaoh | 336,000 | |
| 2025 | 6 June – 5 October | French Impressionism: From the Museum of Fine Arts, Boston | | |
| 2026 | 12 June – 4 October | Cartier | | |

=== Melbourne Now ===
In 2013 the NGV launched "Melbourne Now", an exhibition which celebrated the latest art, architecture, design, performance and cultural practice to reflect the complex cultural landscape of creative Melbourne. "Melbourne Now" ran from 22 November 2013 to 23 March 2014 and attracted record attendances of 753,071.

A decade after the original exhibition, a second edition of Melbourne Now ran from 24 March 2023 to 20 August 2023 at the Ian Potter Centre: NGV Australia. The exhibition, which celebrated home-grown art and design from over 200 Victorian-based emerging and established artists, designers, studios and firms, drew 433,575 attendees, which made the exhibition one of the most popular exhibitions at the Ian Potter Centre: NGV Australia.

=== NGV Triennial ===
Following the success of "Melbourne Now", in March 2014 the NGV announced a major new initiative, the NGV Triennial. Beginning in the Summer of 2017, it is intended as a large-scale celebration of the best of contemporary international art and design. The inaugural Triennial ran from 15 December 2017 to 15 April 2018, and drew almost 1.3 million visitors during its run, making it the most attended exhibition in the gallery's history until then.

The 2020–21 NGV Triennial opened on 19 December 2020 and closed on 18 April 2021. The exhibition, which attracted more than 548,000 visitors during its run, showcased works by more than 100 artists, designers and collectives from 30 countries, with 34 newly commissioned works from a mixture of both Australian and international artists.

The 2023–24 NGV Triennial, running from 3 December 2023 until 7 April 2024, featured over 75 projects by 100 artists, designers and collectives from over 30 countries. The exhibition attracted 1,063,675 visitors during its run, making it one of the most popular exhibitions in the NGV’s history.

== Publications ==
The Art Journal of the National Gallery of Victoria, usually referred to as the Art Journal, was first published as The Quarterly Bulletin of the National Gallery of Victoria in 1945, changing its name and frequency in 1959 to the Annual Bulletin of the National Gallery of Victoria, then to the Art Bulletin of Victoria in 1967–68 (edition 9) (abbreviated to ABV, edition 42). For edition 50 in 2011, in its 50th year of publication and 150th anniversary of the gallery, the name was changed to its present name.

The NGV also publishes a bi-monthly magazine, NGV Magazine.

== Directors of the NGV ==
Directors of the NGV since its inception:

- G. F. Folingsby, 1882–1891
- Lindsay Bernard Hall, 1892–1935
- William Beckwith McInnes, (acting) 1935–1936
- P. M. Carew-Smyth, (acting) 1937
- J. S. Macdonald, 1936–1941
- Sir Ernest Daryl Lindsay, 1942–1955
- Eric Westbrook, 1956–1973
- Gordon Thomson, 1973–1974
- Eric Rowlison, 1975–1980
- Patrick McCaughey, 1981–1987
- T. L. Rodney Wilson, 1988
- James Mollison, AO, 1989–1995
- Timothy Potts, 1995–1998
- Dr Gerard Vaughan, 1999–2012
- Tony Ellwood, 2012–present

== See also ==
- List of national galleries
- List of largest art museums
- Art Gallery of New South Wales
- Queensland Art Gallery
- Art Gallery of South Australia
- Art Gallery of Western Australia
- Tasmanian Museum and Art Gallery
