= Heritage Council of Victoria =

Government agency of Victoria, Australia

The Heritage Council of Victoria is a statutory authority in the Australian state of Victoria, responsible for the protection and conservation of the state's history. It is responsible for maintaining the Victorian Heritage Register and administering the Victorian Heritage Database.

== Council members ==
The council was headed by historian Stuart Macintyre from 2015 until his retirement in 2020 due to ill health. The current council members are:

- Philip Goad, Chair
- Andrew May (historian), Deputy Chair, History Member
- Margaret Baird, Urban or Regional Planning Member
- Rueben Berg, Aboriginal person with relevant experience and knowledge of cultural heritage
- Megan Goulding, Archaeology Member
- Louise Honman, Architectural conservation/Architectural history Member
- Justin Naylor, Financial Management Member
- Jeffrey Robinson, Engineering/Building Construction Member
- Natica Schmeder, National Trust Member
- Simon Molesworth, Legal member
- Mark Burgess, Alternate Financial Management Member
- Adrian Finanzio, Alternate Heritage Law Member
- Anna Foley, Alternate National Trust Member
- Jo Guard, Alternate Urban or Regional Planning Member
- David Hogg, Alternate Engineering/Building Construction Member
- Jamie Lowe, Alternate member, Aboriginal person with relevant experience and knowledge of cultural heritage
- Karen Murphy, Alternate Archaeology Member
- Christine Phillips, Alternate Architectural conservation/Architectural history Member
- Maggi Solly, Alternate General Member
- Helen Doyle, Alternate History Member
