= Christine Phillips =

Australian architect

- Born: Australia
- Education: RMIT University; University of Melbourne
- Occupations: Architect; academic; writer; broadcaster
- Employer: RMIT University
- Known for: OpenHAUS Architecture; The Architects (RRR radio)
- Awards: Bates Smart Media Award (2010), Neville Quarry Architectural Education Prize (2026)

Christine Phillips is an Australian architect, academic, writer and broadcaster based in Melbourne, Australia.

== Biography ==
Since graduating from RMIT University in 2000, Christine Phillips has been an active part of Australia’s architecture culture through her practice, which includes lecturing, writing, broadcasting, curating and exhibiting.

Christine Phillips is a director of the award-winning practice OpenHAUS Architecture and is a lecturer in Architecture at RMIT University teaching Design, Australian Architecture, 20th Century Architecture and Major Project (thesis). As a co-host of the RRR radio program The Architects from 2005–2014 Christine Phillips engaged a broader public audience with architecture on a weekly basis. In 2012 The Architects were show-cased as part of the Australian exhibition, Formations: New Practices in Australian Architecture, at the 2012 Venice Architecture Biennale, Common Ground, directed by David Chipperfield.

Christine Phillips completed her PhD at Melbourne University. Her research focuses on leisure and play in architecture through an examination of modern waterside public swimming pools. Christine Phillips writes for a variety of magazines including Architecture Australia, Architectural Review, Artichoke, Architect Victoria and Steel Profile. In addition she is the secretary of the Australian chapter of DOCOMOMO.

== Awards ==
- 2010 — Australian Institute of Architecture’s Bates Smart Media Award: Advertisements for Architecture 2009 Exhibition, Federation Square, Melbourne Australia.
- 2026 — Neville Quarry Architectural Education Prize.

== Exhibition curation ==
- Advertisements for Architecture, 2009, Federation Square, Melbourne.
- Advertisements for Architecture, 2010, Surrey Hills Library, Sydney.

== Publications ==
- Christine Phillips ‘A Hybrid Approach to Architecture: The Residential Work of Seabrook and Fildes’ in Limits: Proceedings of the 21st Annual Conference of the Society of Architectural Historians Australia & New Zealand, Melbourne 2004.
- Christine Phillips, ‘1934 and Mac. Robertson Girls' High School: Evolution or Revolution for Melbourne’s public architecture?’, Celebration: Society of Architectural Historians Australia & New Zealand, Napier 2005.
- Christine Phillips and Dr. Peter Raisbeck, ‘Contesting Brutalism in Australia: Robin Boyd and the dissemination of Brutalism’ in Contested Terrains: Society of Architectural Historians Australia & New Zealand, Freemantle, 2006.
- Christine Phillips ‘This is not a terrace’, Architectural Review, October – November 2009. ‘Steeling the Show’, Steel Profile, June 2009.
- Christine Phillips, ‘Seabrook and Fildes’ entry in Goad, Philip et al. (2012). The Encyclopedia of Australian Architecture. Cambridge University Press. pp. 620–621.
- Christine Phillips, ‘So I decided to go Down Under: A postcard from Melbourne’, Guest editorial for Architect Victoria, Winter Edition, RVIA, 2008.
- Christine Phillips, ‘Oppressed by the Figures of Beauty: Melbourne architecture and the grotesque’, Guest editorial with Anthony Parker for Architect Victoria, Winter Edition, RVIA, 2007.
- Christine Phillips, ‘Seabrook and Fildes: More than MacRobertson Girls High School’, Art Deco Society, Spring 2002.
- Christine Phillips, ‘Two Imaginings of the Seaside’, Imagining: Proceedings of the 27th International Society of Architectural Historians Australia and New Zealand Conference, June–July, 2010.
- Christine Phillips, ‘The Modern Pool as a New Civic Space’, Living in the Urban Modernity, 11th International Docomomo Conference, August 2010
- Christine Phillips, ‘The Modern Pool as a New Civic Space’, Architektura & Urbanizmus: Journal for Architecture and Town Planning Theory, v.64, Issue 3-4, 2010.
