= Paul Carter (academic) =

Australian academic, writer and artist

Paul Carter is a British academic and writer.

== Life and career ==
Paul Carter was born and brought up in Faringdon, Oxon., UK attending a local grammar school and later Oxford University. In the 1970s he lived largely in Spain and Italy, working at a variety of jobs in order to support his own poetic education and cultural research. Moving to Australia in the early 1980s, he redirected his interests in poetics and aesthetics to the renarration of the conceptual foundations of white settler society in Australia. His book The Road to Botany Bay (1987) introduced the idea of ‘spatial history’ and was praised by Edward Said (‘a brilliantly daring notion of imperialism’) and Susan Sontag (an ‘ingenious account of nation-founding ... itself a kind of founding book’). His follow-up publication, The Lie of the Land, has been widely recognised as a major contribution to postcolonial geography.

Research for this book stimulated an interest in the dynamics of cross-cultural communication, generating a body of radiophonic work and museum installation, supported respectively by the Australian Broadcasting Corporation and Radio Rundfunk, Cologne and (among others) Hyde Park Barracks (Sydney) and the Museum of Sydney. A multilingual soundscape (‘Columbus Echo’) designed for the Acquario di Genova led to a collaboration with composer Luciano Berio and to the ‘anti-novel’ Baroque Memories (the Italian translation included a preface by Antonio Tabucchi, who noted how a ‘further complication of an already complex situation produces, paradoxically, a simplification and, indeed, a resolution.’

In the late 1990s his studies in the mythopoetic mechanisms of placemaking led to major commissions as a public artist. Relay (with Ruark Lewis) for the Sydney 2000 Olympics and Nearamnew (a collaboration with Lab architecture studio and Karres en Brands) at Federation Square, Melbourne, used text, typography and ground patterning to integrate ‘reading’ and ‘treading.’ There followed numerous public space design projects, independently through the design studio Material Thinking, or in collaboration with leading Australian architects and landscape architects. His story-based tool for urban design and program integration, the ‘creative template’, was adopted by the Western Australian Government's major planning agency, the Metropolitan Redevelopment Authority, in 2016.

His collaborations with artists between 1990 and 2004 were described in the book Material Thinking: the theory and practice of creative research (2004). More recently he has focused on the choreography of sociability in public settings, exploring the concept of the designer as dramaturg. His publications in this area are characterized as ‘cultural writing,’ as the vehicle of the analysis is invariably a distinctive literary style and narrative structure. In Meeting Place (2013) he differentiated between encounter and meeting to foreground the performative foundations of civil coexistence. Places Made After Their Stories (2015) introduces the notion of ‘choreotopography’ to characterize the arrangements that emerge from feedback between society and setting. Michael Bull describes his recent book Amplifications (2018) as ‘personal, poetic – full of literary allusions connected to significant radio productions re-visited, re-imagined and literally remade. The text is rather like a sonic Proust meeting a John Berger for the ears ...’ The radio scripts referred to have been published in Absolute Rhythm: works for minor radio (2020).

In 2019 Carter co-edited Poseidonia Water City: archaeology and climate change, the catalogue of the exhibition of the same name held at the National Archaeological Museum of Paestum (2019–2020).

Paul has worked as a freelance writer (Books and Bookmen, Art and Artists, PNR Review), as a journalist (The Age Monthly Review, 1986-1990) and has held various research positions (University of Melbourne 1994-2008; Deakin University (2009–2011) and RMIT where he is Professor of Design (Urbanism).

== Awards ==
2021. The Australian Book Designer Association, Best Designed Independent Book for Signature.

2020. The Philip Hodgins Memorial Medal (Mildura Writers Festival) for Excellence in Literature.

2018. Urban Development Institute of Australia (WA), Award for Excellence, Government and Public Use Category (Material Thinking with Taylor, Cullity, Lethlean) for Scarborough Foreshore.

2018. Urban Development Institute of Australia (WA), Award for Excellence, Urban Renewal category (Material Thinking with Lyons Architects, IPH architects, Aspect studios) for Yagan Square.

2018. Planning Institute of Australia (WA), ‘Great Place’ award and commendation for ‘Best planning Ideas – Large Project’ (Material Thinking with Lyons Architects, IPH architects, Aspect studios).

2014. (with Rush Wright landscape architects) AILA Victoria Design in Landscape Architecture Excellence Award for Dandenong Civic Centre landscape.

2010. National Landscape Architecture Award of Excellence of the Australian Institute of Landscape Architects for Design for 'Golden Grove', Darlington Public Domain (University of Sydney) Stage Two (with Taylor, Cullity, Lethlean, Landscape Architects).

2010. Member of the following team selected to represent Australia at 2010 Venice Architecture Biennale: Loop-Pool / Saturation City, McGauran Giannini Soon (MGS), Bild + Dyskors, Material Thinking, MGS - Eli Giannini, Jocelyn Chiew, Catherine Ranger, Bild - Ben Milbourne, Dyskors - Edmund Carter, Material Thinking - Paul Carter.

2007. Merit Award for Design in Landscape Architecture (2007) of the Australian Institute of Landscape Architects (Victoria) (with Taylor, Cullity and Lethlean) for Darlington Public Domain Stage One, University of Sydney.

2004. Excellence for Planning Award of the Australian institute of Landscape Architects (with Taylor Cullity Lethlean, Peter Elliot Architects, and James Hayter and Associates) for North Terrace Precinct (Adelaide.

2003. Award for Design Excellence of the Australian Institute of Landscape Architects, Victoria and Tasmania (with Lab architecture studio, Bates Smart, Karres en Brands Landschapsarchitecten and Equinox Design Group) for Federation Square plaza.

2003. Award for Landscape Architecture of the Australian Institute of Landscape Architects, Victoria and Tasmania (with Lab architecture studio, Bates Smart, Karres en Brands Landschapsarchitecten and Equinox Design Group) for Federation Square plaza.

2003. The Woodward Medal for significant contributions to the Humanities and Social Sciences at the University of Melbourne.

1988. Victorian Premier's Award for Non-Fiction for The Road to Botany Bay.

== Publications ==
- The Abandoned Room (poems), Sydney: Vagabond Press, 2025.
- Neglected Dimensions: sketches for public space, Barcelona/New York: Actar, 2025.
- Naming No Man’s Land: postcolonial toponymies, London: Palgrave Macmillan, 2024.
- Return of the Centaurs, a Field Guide, Napoli: Arte’m, 2023.
- Translations, an autoethnography: migration, colonial Australia and the creative encounter, Manchester: Manchester University Press, 2021.
- Absolute Rhythm: works for minor radio. Cardiff, Wales: Performance Research Publications, 2020.
- Signature, designer Sean Hogan/Trampoline. Melbourne: Lyon Housemuseum, 2020.
- Amplifications: poetic migration, auditory memory. New York: Bloomsbury Academic, 2019.
- Decolonising Governance: Archipelagic Thinking. London: Routledge, 2018.
- Places Made After Their Stories: design and the art of choreotopography, Nedlands WA: University of Western Australia Publishing, 2015.
- Turbulence: climate change and the design of complexity, Sydney: Puncher & Wattmann, 2015.
- Metabolism: The Exhibition of the Unseen, Melbourne: Lyon Housemuseum, 2015.
- Ecstacies and Elegies (poems), Nedlands, WA: University of Western Australia Publishing, 2013.
- Meeting Place: the Human Encounter & the Challenge of Coexistence, Minneapolis: University of Minnesota Press, 2013.
- Ground Truthing: Explorations in a creative region, Nedlands, WA: University of Western Australia Publishing, 2010.
- Dark Writing: Geography, Performance, Design, Honolulu:University of Hawaii Press, 2008.
- Parrot, Reaktion Books, London: Reaktion Books 2006.
- Mythform: the Making of Nearamnew at Federation Square, Melbourne, Carlton, Vic: Melbourne University Press/Miegunyah Press, 2005.
- Material Thinking, The Theory and Practice of Creative Research, Carlton, Vic: Melbourne University Press, 2004, 2014.
- Repressed Spaces: the poetics of agoraphobia, London: Reaktion Books, 2002.
- Depth of Translation, the book of Raft (with Ruark Lewis), Melbourne: New Music Articles, 1999.
- Lost Subjects, Sydney: Historic Houses Trust of New South Wales, 1999.
- The Lie of the Land, London: Faber & Faber, 1996.
- The Calling to Come, Sydney: Historic Houses Trust of New South Wales, 1996.
- Hossein Valamanesh, Sydney: Craftsman House, 1996.
- Baroque Memories, Manchester: Carcanet Press, 1994. And: Memorie Barocche, Una stravaganza, trans. Stefano Stoja, preface: Antonio Tabucchi: Lecce: Argo Editrice,1998.
- Living In A New Country: History, Travelling, Writing, London: Faber & Faber, 1992.
- The Sound In-Between Voice, Space, Performance, Sydney: New Endeavour/University of New South Wales Press, 1992.
- The Road to Botany Bay, an essay in spatial history, London: Faber & Faber, New York: Knopf, Chicago: University of Chicago Press, 1987, 1988; Minneapolis: University of Minnesota Press, 2010.
- Before Cold Mountain, Poems, Isle-of-Wight: Yellowsands Press, 1973.
