= Neville Quarry =

Australian architect and academic

Professor Neville Quarry AM
- Born: 1933; Coburg, Victoria, Australia
- Died: October 2004; Sydney, Australia
- Education: University of Melbourne; Rice University
- Occupation: Architect
- Spouse: Peg
- Awards: Australian Institute of Architects Gold Medal 1994

Neville David Quarry AM (1933–2004) was an Australian architect, architectural academic, critic and educator.

== Early life ==
Neville Quarry was born in Coburg, Victoria in 1933.

== Architecture education ==
He commenced his architectural studies at the University of Melbourne and he graduated in 1956, undertaking his final year of study in New Zealand. He later completed a Master of Architecture at Rice University, Texas in 1961.

== Academic career ==
In 1971 Neville Quarry moved to Lae, Papua New Guinea as the first Head of the School of Architecture at the Papua New Guinea Institute (now University) of Technology. He then moved back to Australia in 1976 to take up a position at the NSW Institute of Technology (later University of Technology, Sydney). He became Professor of Architecture and Dean of the Faculty of Design Architecture and Building at UTS. He retired from academia in 1994.

== Achievements ==
In 1991 Quarry was the first Australian Commissioner to the Venice Architecture Biennale with an exhibition titled Architetti Australiani, that featured the work of architects from South East Queensland including Gabriel Poole, Lindsay and Kerry Clare and Rex Addison.

In 1994 Neville Quarry was awarded the Australian Institute of Architects Gold Medal the highest achievement for an individual architect, as a recognition to his contribution to architecture, education and design. He was the first architecture academic to be awarded the medal.

In 1995 he was made a Member of the Order of Australia for service to architecture.

In 1996 he chaired the jury for the international architectural design competition for Federation Square in Melbourne. The process selected the winner, Lab Architecture Studio and delivered a successful outcome for the site and the city.

== Death ==
Neville Quarry died in Sydney from cancer, five weeks after the initial diagnosis, October 2004, aged 70-71.

== Legacy ==
A national prize titled the Neville Quarry Architectural Education Prize is awarded annually by the Australian Institute of Architects.The Prize is awarded on the basis of demonstrated national or international peer recognition for significant contribution to architectural education in one or more of the following assessment categories: teaching, scholarship, research, leadership and community engagement.

== See also ==
- Australian Institute of Architects Gold Medal
