= Ian Potter Centre: NGV Australia =

Art gallery in Melbourne, Victoria

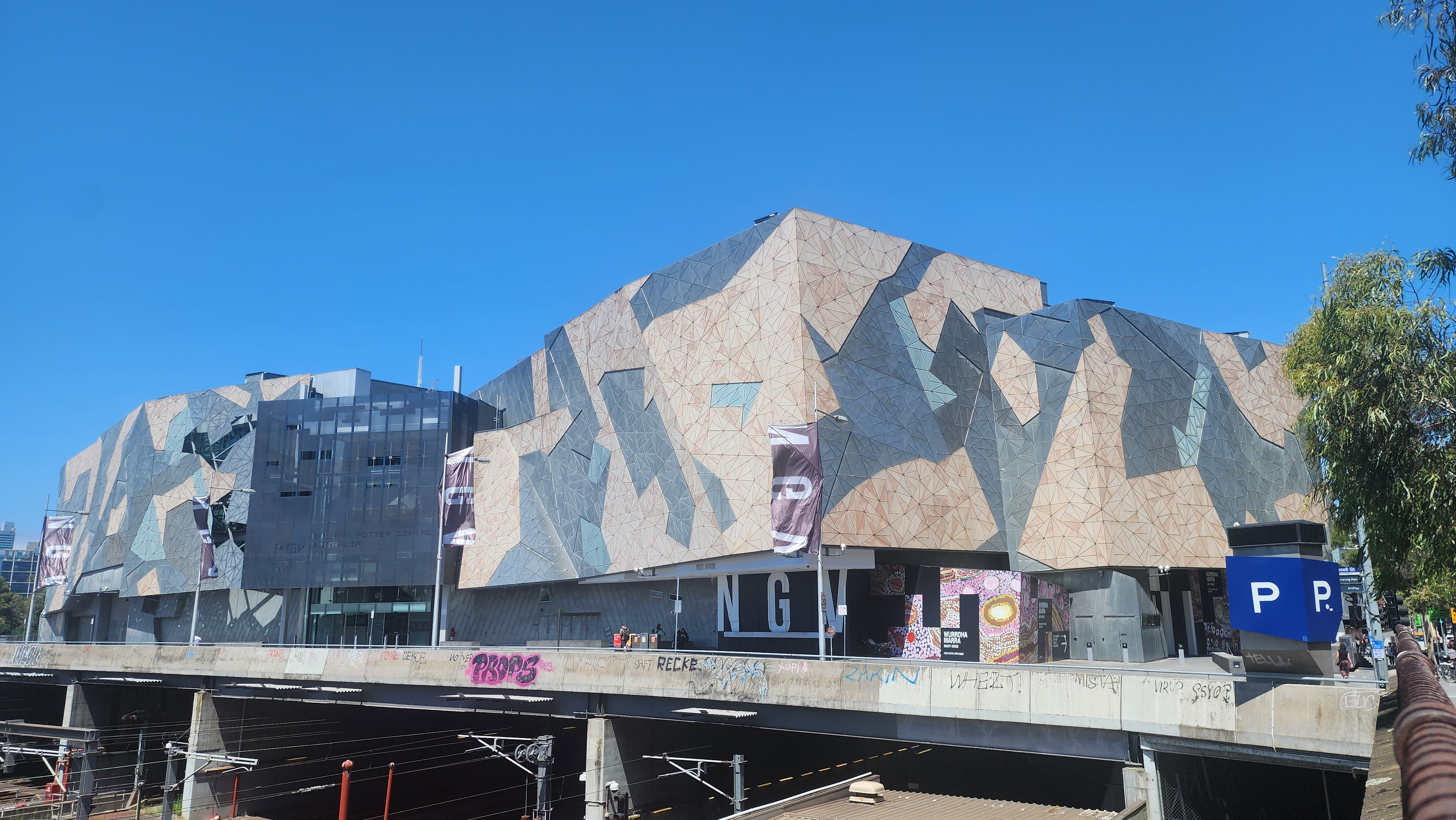
- View from Flinders Street and Russell Street junction
- Location: Federation Square, Melbourne, Victoria, Australia
- Coordinates: 37.817798°S 144.968714°E
- Architects: Lab Architecture Studio; Bates Smart
- Owner: National Gallery of Victoria
- Website: www.ngv.vic.gov.au

The Ian Potter Centre: NGV Australia is an art gallery that houses the Australian part of the art collection of the National Gallery of Victoria (NGV).

The Ian Potter Centre: NGV Australia is located at Federation Square in Melbourne, Victoria; while the gallery's international works are displayed at the NGV International on St Kilda Road.

== Collection ==
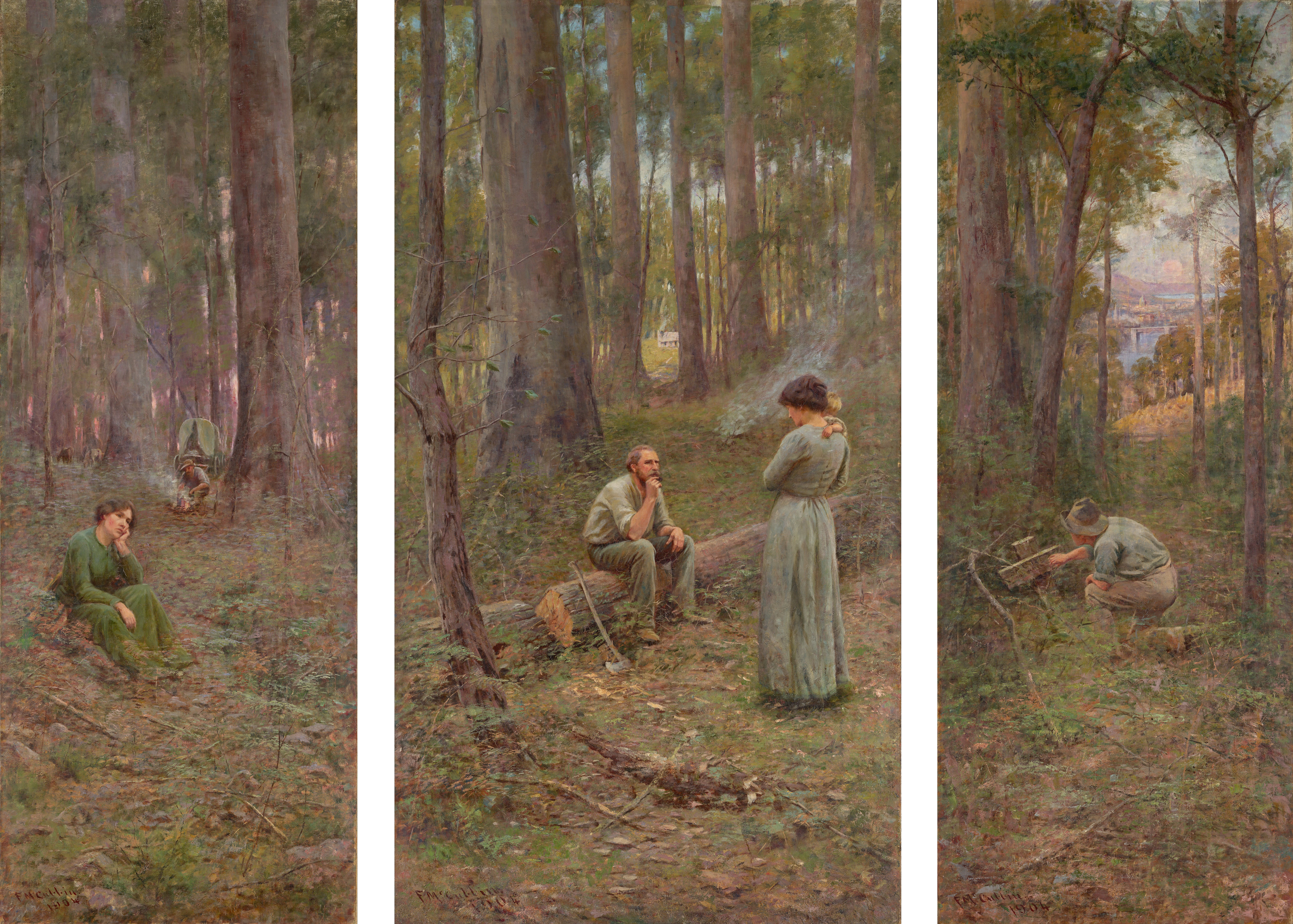
The pioneer

There are over 20,000 Australian artworks, including paintings, sculpture, prints, photography, fashion and textiles, and the collection is one of the oldest and most well known in the country.

The Ian Potter Centre is a legacy of the businessman and philanthropist Sir Ian Potter. Well-known works at the Ian Potter Centre include Frederick McCubbin's The pioneer (1904) and Tom Roberts' Shearing the Rams (1890). Also featured are works from Sidney Nolan, Arthur Boyd, Albert Tucker, Arthur Streeton, John Perceval, Margaret Preston, Bill Henson, Howard Arkley and Fred Williams.

Indigenous art includes works by William Barak and Emily Kngwarreye.

== Building design ==
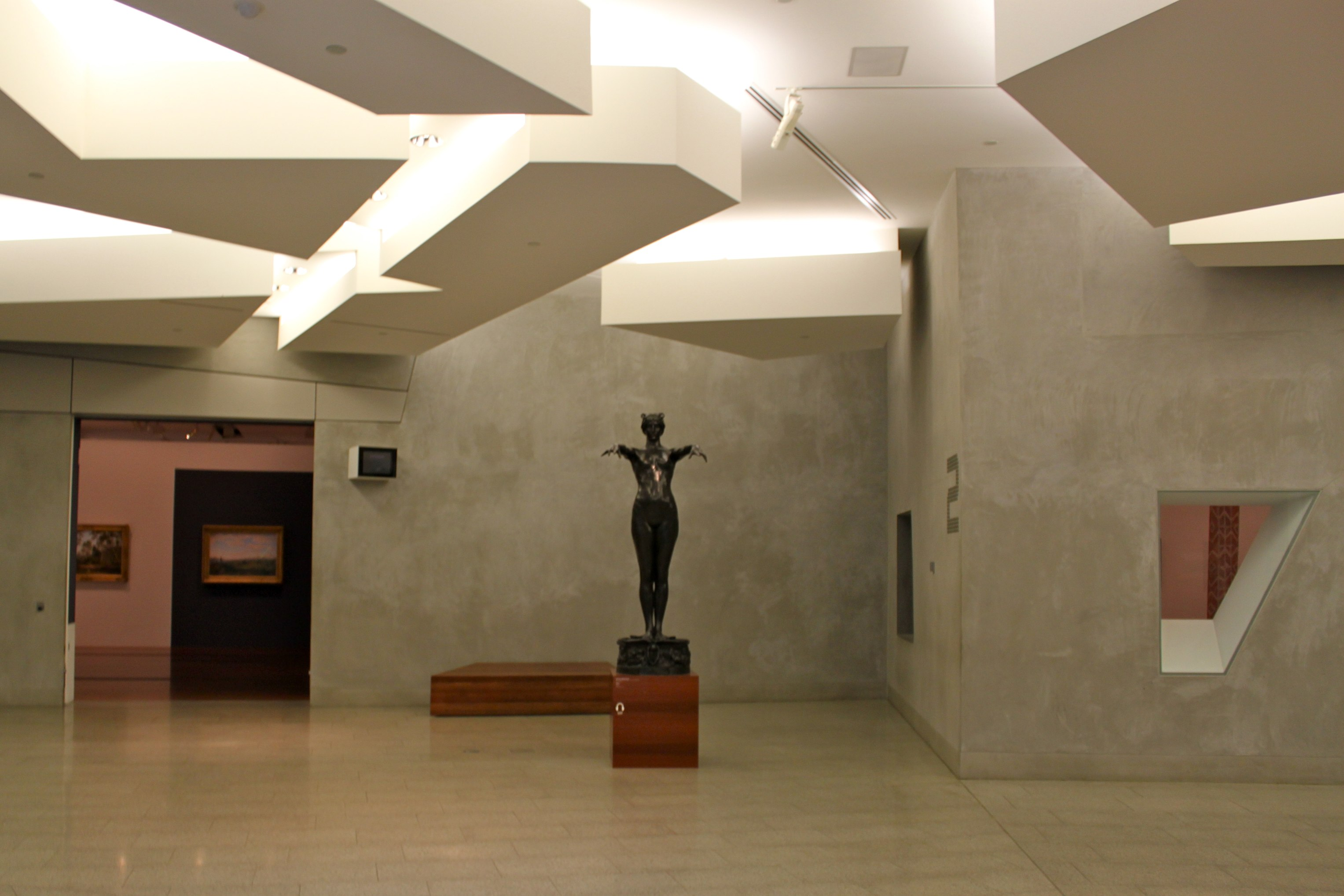
Interior of one of the gallery spaces inside the Ian Potter Centre

The design of the Ian Potter Centre was commissioned to Lab Architecture Studio in association with Bates Smart of Melbourne, headed by Peter Davidson and Donald Bates. Their work has since earned them The RAIA National Award for Interior Architecture as well as the Marion Mahony Interior Architecture Award. According to the Australian Institute of Architects:

"The scope of the commission was comprehensive, involving not only the design of the building itself, but the gallery interiors, the laying out of all secondary (temporary) walls, exhibition design for the first hang including the selection of colours and paintings of walls, the development of the building's identity and a specific graphic typeface, the design of fixtures, fitting, counters, gallery and public furniture and multimedia housings, retail fit outs for the gallery shop and Level 3 cafe."

== See also ==
- List of museums in Melbourne
