= Shearing the Rams =

Painting by Tom Roberts

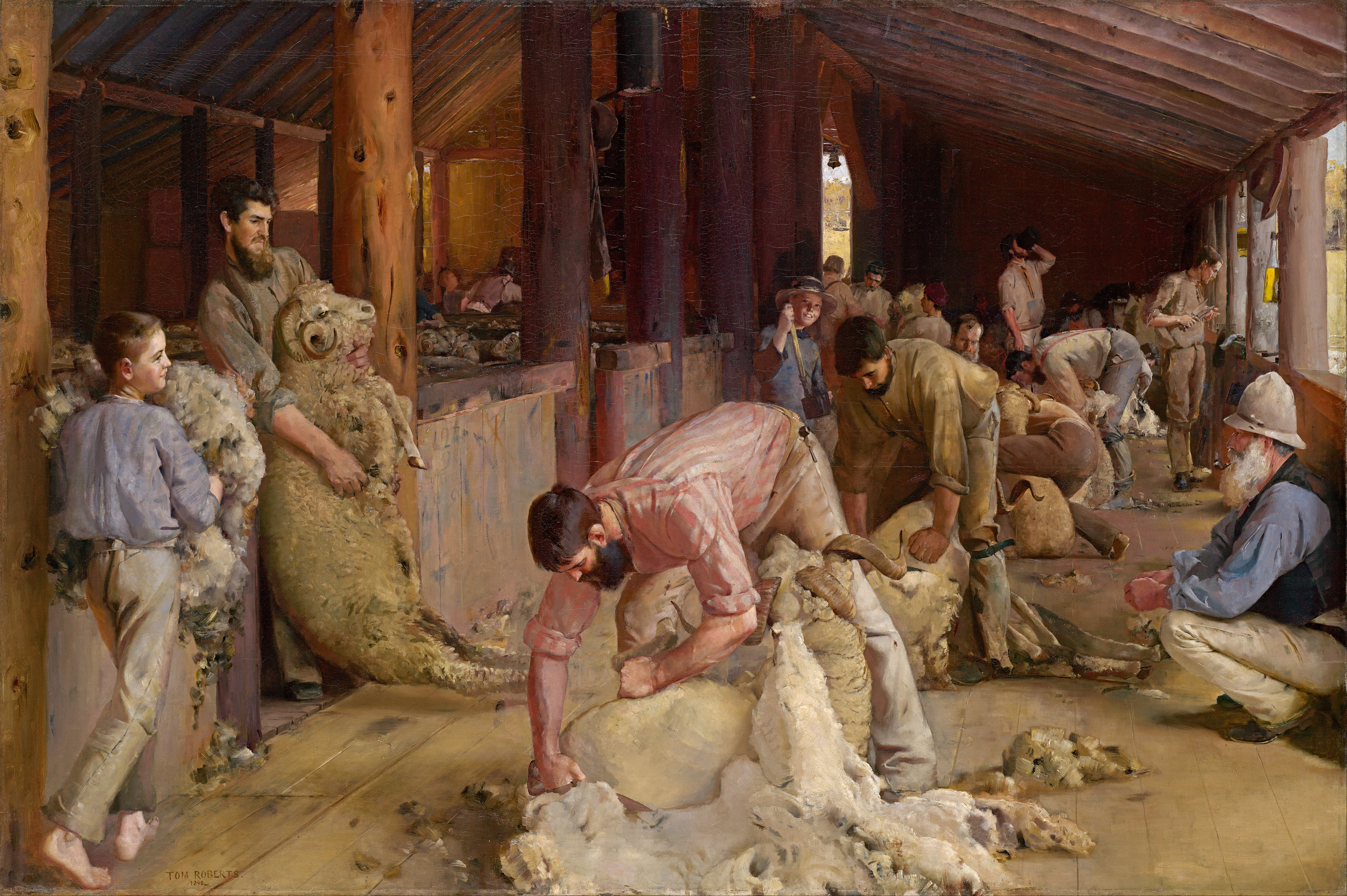
- Artist: Tom Roberts
- Year: 1890
- Medium: oil on canvas on composition board
- Dimensions: 122.4 cm × 183.3 cm (48.2 in × 72.2 in)
- Location: National Gallery of Victoria, Melbourne

Shearing the Rams is an 1890 painting by Australian artist Tom Roberts. It depicts sheep shearers plying their trade in a timber shearing shed. Distinctly Australian in character, the painting is a celebration of pastoral life and work, especially "strong, masculine labour", and recognises the role that the wool industry played in the development of the country.

One of the best-known and most-loved paintings in Australia, Shearing the Rams has been described as a "masterpiece of Australian impressionism" and "the great icon of Australian popular art history". It forms part of the National Gallery of Victoria's Australian art collection, held at the Ian Potter Centre in Federation Square, Melbourne.

== Composition ==
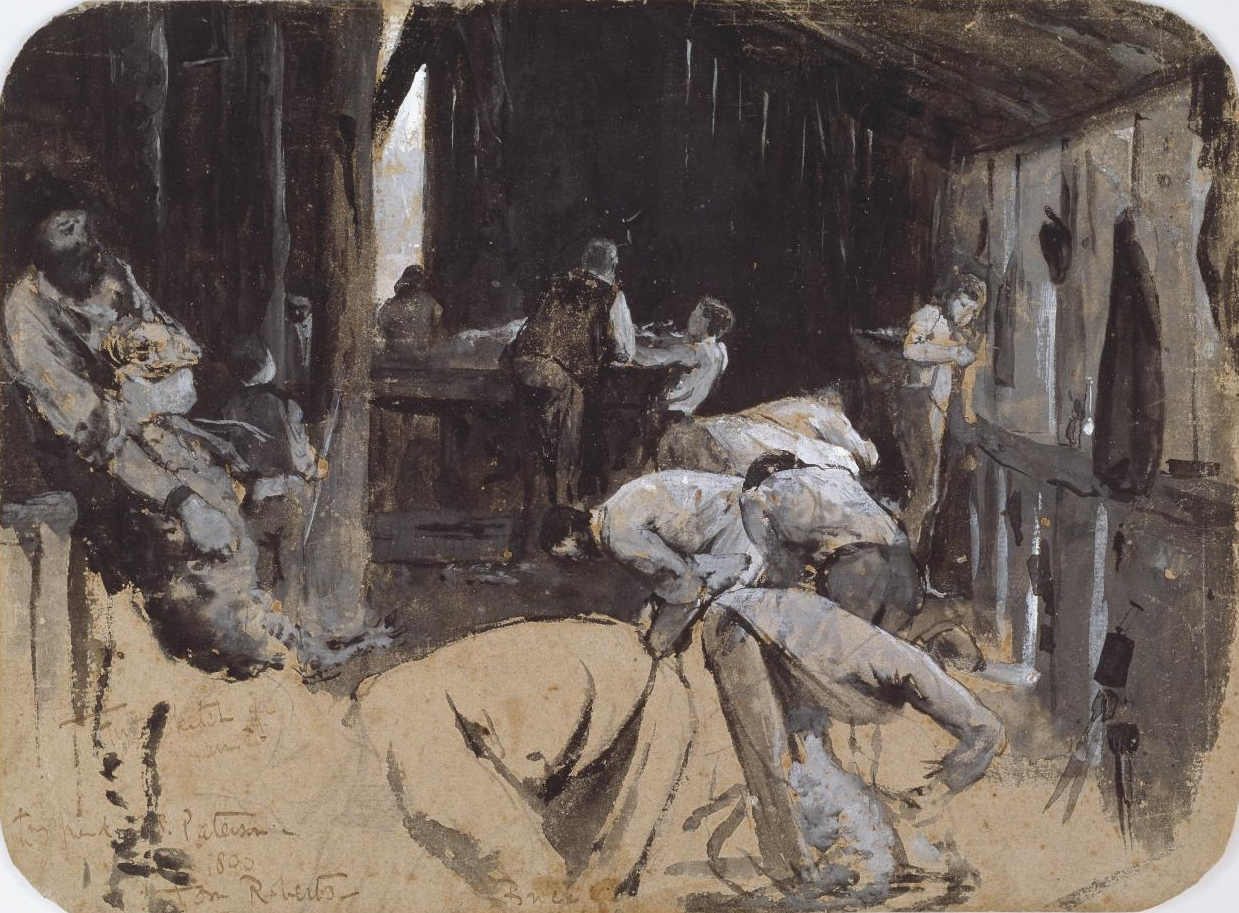
One of at least seventy sketches Robert made in preparation for Shearing the Rams

Roberts modelled his painting on a shearing shed at what is now called Killeneen, an outstation of the 24,000-hectare (59,000-acre) Brocklesby sheep station, near Corowa in the Riverina region of New South Wales. The property was owned by the Anderson family, distant relations to Roberts, who first visited the station in 1886 to attend a family wedding. Having decided on shearing as the subject for a painting, Roberts arrived at Brocklesby in the spring of 1888, making around 70 or 80 preliminary sketches of "the light, the atmosphere, the sheep, the men and the work" before returning to the station the following shearing season with his canvas. Roberts' work was noted by the local press with reports of him "dressed in blue shirt and moleskins ... giving the last finishing touches to a picture in oils about 5ft by 4ft."

Art historians had previously thought Roberts completed most of the painting in his Melbourne studio, using the sketches drawn in his time at Brocklesby. In 2003 however, art critic and historian Paul Johnson wrote: "Tom Roberts spent two years, on the spot, painting Shearing the Rams". New evidence was brought to light in 2006 that suggested that Roberts painted much of the work en plein air at the shearing shed itself. In 2006, The National Gallery of Victoria (NGV) conducted a scientific examination of paint left on a piece of timber salvaged from the now-destroyed shed, where it was thought that Roberts cleaned his brushes. The study confirmed that the paint, in a number of different shades, precisely matched the paint used in the painting. The senior curator of art at the NGV, Terence Lane, believes this is strong evidence that much of the work was done on location: "For me, that's evidence of a lot of time spent in that woolshed ... all those paint marks and the selection of colours indicates he spent so much time en plein air".

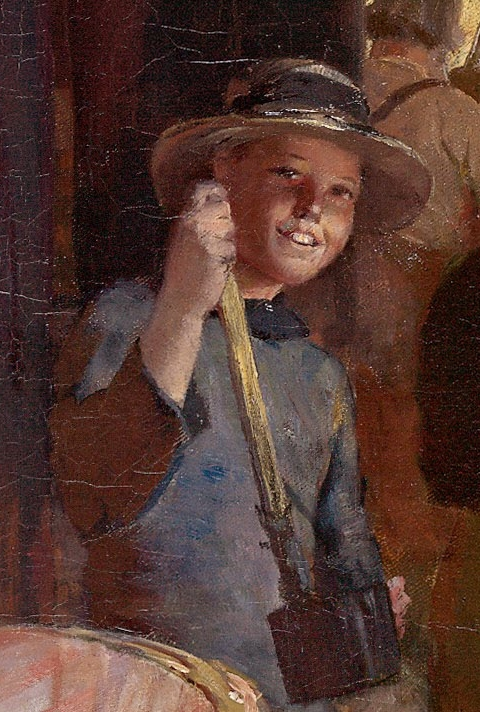
The "smiling tarboy" at the centre of the painting was modelled on local girl Susan Bourne, then 9 years old.

In a seeming anachronism, the painting shows sheep being shorn with blade shears rather than the machine shears which started to enter Australian shearing sheds in the late 1880s. Art historian Terry Smith's suggestion that Roberts presented a deliberately historical vision of shearing has been questioned on account of there being no evidence that electric shears had been introduced to Brocklesby at the time of the painting's composition. The young man carrying the fleece on the left of the painting alludes to the figure of Esau in Ghiberti's Gates of Paradise at the Florence Baptistery. The model for the smiling tar-boy at the centre of the picture, the only figure to make eye contact with the viewer, was actually a girl, 9-year-old Susan Bourne, who lived until 1979. She also assisted Roberts by kicking up dust in the shed to allow him to capture some of the atmosphere.

The white and pink striped shirt of the central shearer carries the highest tonal point of the composition, and is identical to that of Will Maloney's in an 1887 portrait by John Russell, a close friend of Roberts who spent most of his career in France. The trio travelled Europe together in the mid-1880s, and when Maloney returned to Melbourne with the portrait in 1888, Russell instructed him to show it to Roberts. It has therefore been speculated that the shearer's shirt is Roberts' tribute to his friends.

An x-ray study of the painting in 2007, taken while the painting was being cleaned, unveiled Roberts' original sketch of the central shearer. In that original sketch, the shearer was lacking a beard and was more upright; the change to a stooping figure makes the shearer appear more in control of the sheep, improving his role as the painting's focus.

John Thallon, a Melbourne frame-maker, provided the frame for many of Roberts' paintings, including this one.

== History ==
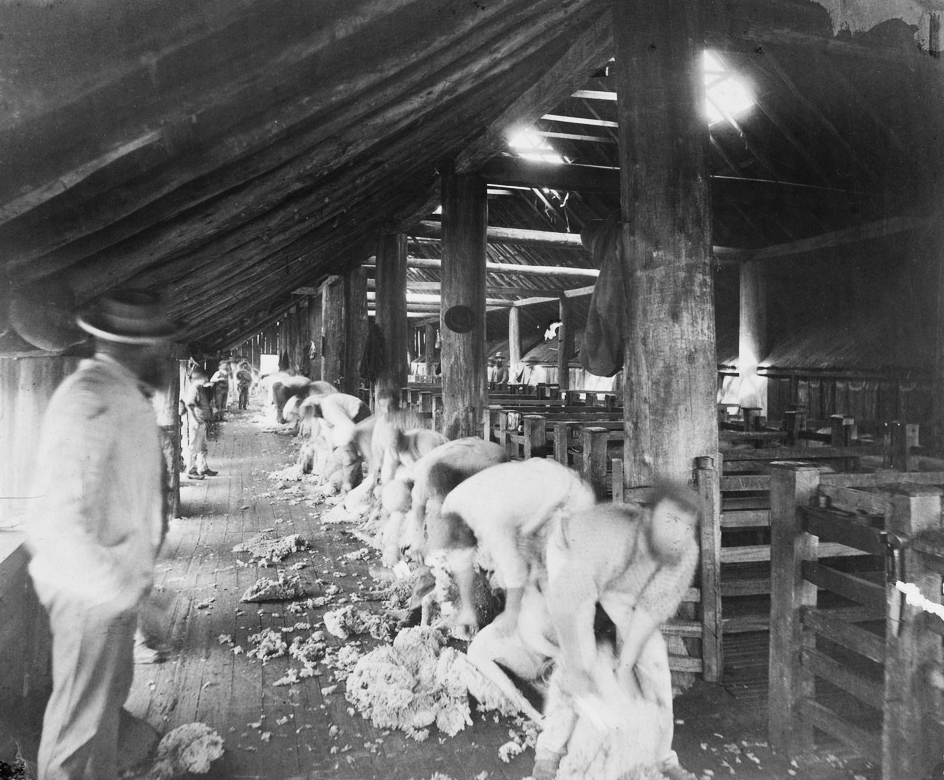
Photograph of a shearing shed outside Melbourne, taken by Charles Nettleton, c. 1880

Roberts was born in England in 1856 and migrated to Australia with his family in 1869, settling in Collingwood, a working-class suburb of Melbourne. A talented artist, Roberts attended classes at the National Gallery of Victoria Art School before returning to England in 1881 when he was selected to study at the Royal Academy of Arts. While touring Europe with Australian artist John Peter Russell, Roberts adopted the principles of impressionism and plein air painting and brought them back with him to Australia when he returned in 1885. With like-minded artists, he helped to form the "Heidelberg School" movement, a group of Melbourne-based impressionists who depicted rural life and the bush, with nationalist and regionalist overtones.

The Australian colonies celebrated the centenary of European settlement in 1880s, and for the first time, Australian-born Europeans outnumbered the immigrant population. These and other factors fostered strong nationalistic feeling and intense discussion about Australian history, culture and identity. Seeking to develop a national art, Roberts chose agricultural and pastoral subjects that would symbolise the embryonic nation, such as bushranging, droving and shearing. In the 19th century, wool was a major source of wealth for the colonies, and by the 1870s, Australia had become the world's largest wool producer. Historian Geoffrey Blainey states that shearers of that era, like Jackie Howe, were seen almost as "folk heroes" with shearing tallies reported in local newspapers in a similar manner to sports scores. Shearers also inspired popular bush ballads around this time, such as "Click Go the Shears" and the poems of Banjo Paterson. According to Paul Johnson, Shearing the Rams, like works by Heidelberg School member Arthur Streeton, illustrates the tribute paid by Australian artists to their country: "[they] saw the country as a place where hard work and determination were making it the world's paradise". The painting itself is described by Johnson as a celebration of "the industry which produced the wealth" of Australia.

It seems to me that one of the best words spoken to an artist is "Paint what you love, and love what you paint," and on that I have worked: and so it came that being in the bush and feeling the delight and fascination of the great pastoral life and work I have tried to express it [...] So lying on wool-bales ... it seemed that I had there the best expression of my subject, a subject noble and worthy enough if I could express the meaning and spirit—of strong masculine labour, the patience of the animals whose year's growth is being stripped from them for man's use and the great human interest in the whole scene.

— Tom Roberts, 1890

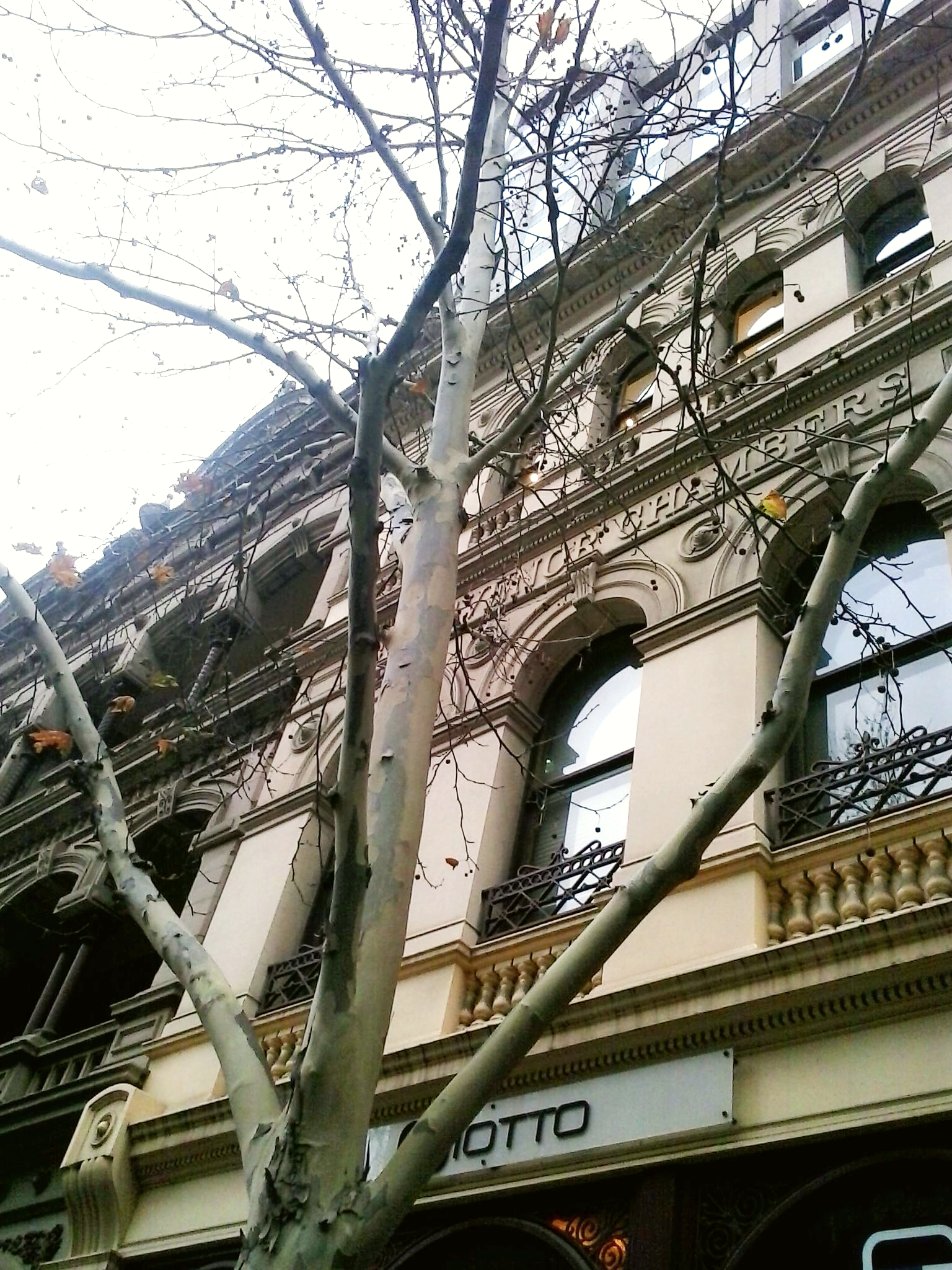
Grosvenor Chambers, where Roberts made final touches to Shearing the Rams and first put it on exhibition

Roberts finished Shearing the Rams in May 1890 and unveiled it at his studio at Grosvenor Chambers on Collins Street, Melbourne. There were immediately calls for the painting to enter a public gallery, with a Melbourne correspondent for the Sydney press stating, "if our national gallery trustees were in the least patriotic, they would purchase it." Roberts wished to sell the painting to the National Gallery of Victoria, however this was opposed by key people at the gallery, including director George Folingsby and one of the trustees. Eventually he sold the painting to a local stock and station agent for 350 guineas; the agent displayed it in his office in Melbourne. The NGV finally acquired the painting in 1932—one year after Roberts' death—using funds from the Felton Bequest.

The painting was rehung in a new, wider frame in 2002; according to the NGV conservators this was in line with Roberts' original frame, which had been trimmed down over the years as framing fashion changed. In 2006, the NGV began a major restoration of the picture, the first in over 80 years. The painting had slowly lost its cover as the natural resin used in the previous restoration gradually degraded. The restoration revealed much of Roberts' original colour palette as well as background details previously not recognised. After the painting was cleaned, Lane claimed that he "could see the way the space and light flowed across the back reaches of the shearing shed in a way we really hadn't been aware of before." The painting is currently displayed with the NGV's Australian art collection in the Ian Potter Centre at Federation Square in Melbourne.

== Critical reaction ==
Shearing the Rams is a work that will live, and a work by which Mr. Roberts' name will always be remembered.

— Table Talk, 1890

The painting was initially generally well-received with Melbourne newspaper The Age reporting that it was a "most important work of a distinctly Australian character". Among the many visitors to Grosvenor Chambers to see Shearing the Rams were "practical men from the bush". "It is right", they reportedly said when asked about the work. One journalist explained:

They mean that the shed is a shed such as they know, the men are shearers and are really shearing, and the sheep are those they see in the show-yards and in stud flocks. The sun of the full Australian springtide streams through the broad low windows, and through the end door there is a glimpse of the open bush all aglow. "It is right"—there is nothing more to be said.

However, more conservative elements were critical of the work, with James Smith of The Argus, Melbourne's foremost art critic, commenting that the picture was too naturalistic: "art should be of all times, not of one time, of all places, not of one place", adding "we do not go to an art gallery to see how sheep are shorn". In response, Roberts defended his choice of subject, stating that "by making art the perfect expression of one time and one place, it becomes for all time and of all places".

In its 1890 review of the painting, The Argus wrote that the shearers, "native and to the manner born", present "the physical characteristics of Young Australia". Art historian Chris Mcauliffe echoed this interpretation, calling the shearers "perfect specimens of manhood" who, in Roberts' vision, represented "the so-called 'coming man' of Australia".

More recent critics have remarked that it presents an idealised and nostalgic view of pastoral life in Australia, with no sign of the conflict then taking place between the newly formed Amalgamated Shearers' Union of Australasia and the squatters, which culminated in the 1891 Australian shearers' strike. However, the painting would eventually be considered as "the definitive image of an emerging national identity."

== Legacy ==
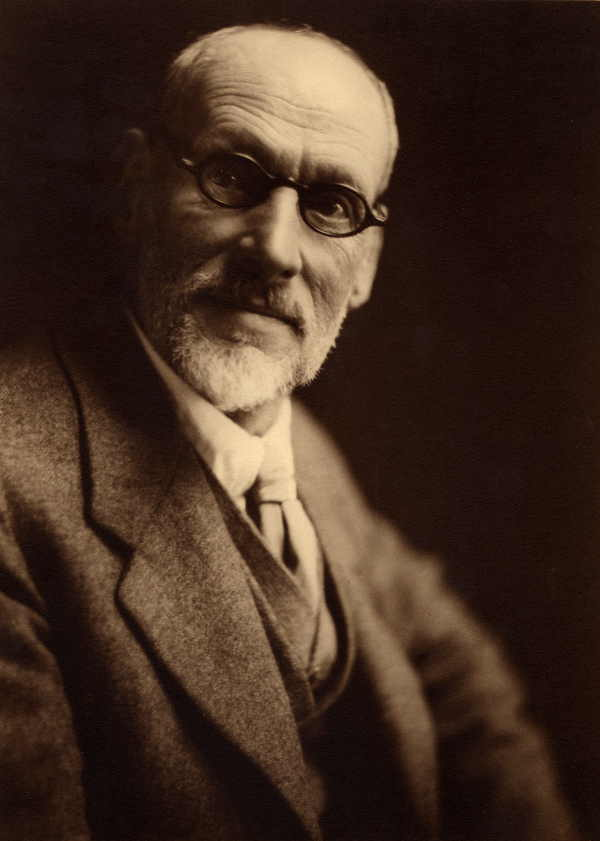
Roberts in his later years

Shearing the Rams became one of the most well-known and loved paintings in the history of Australian art. The picture is widely recognised from "schoolbooks, calendars, jigsaw puzzles, matchboxes and postage stamps." Parodies of the painting have been used in advertising campaigns for items such as hardware and underwear to express what one person described as "promoting what it means to be Australian today". The Australian cartoonist and social commentator Michael Leunig drew a reinterpration of the painting called Ramming the shears said to be "humourous [sic] and thought provoking in the questions it raises about Australian national identity". The "self-consciously nationalist" image of young white men has been appropriated by other artists on behalf of several excluded groups, including women and immigrants. Nyoongar artist Dianne Jones made an Indigenous claim for inclusion by inserting her father and cousin into the iconic painting.

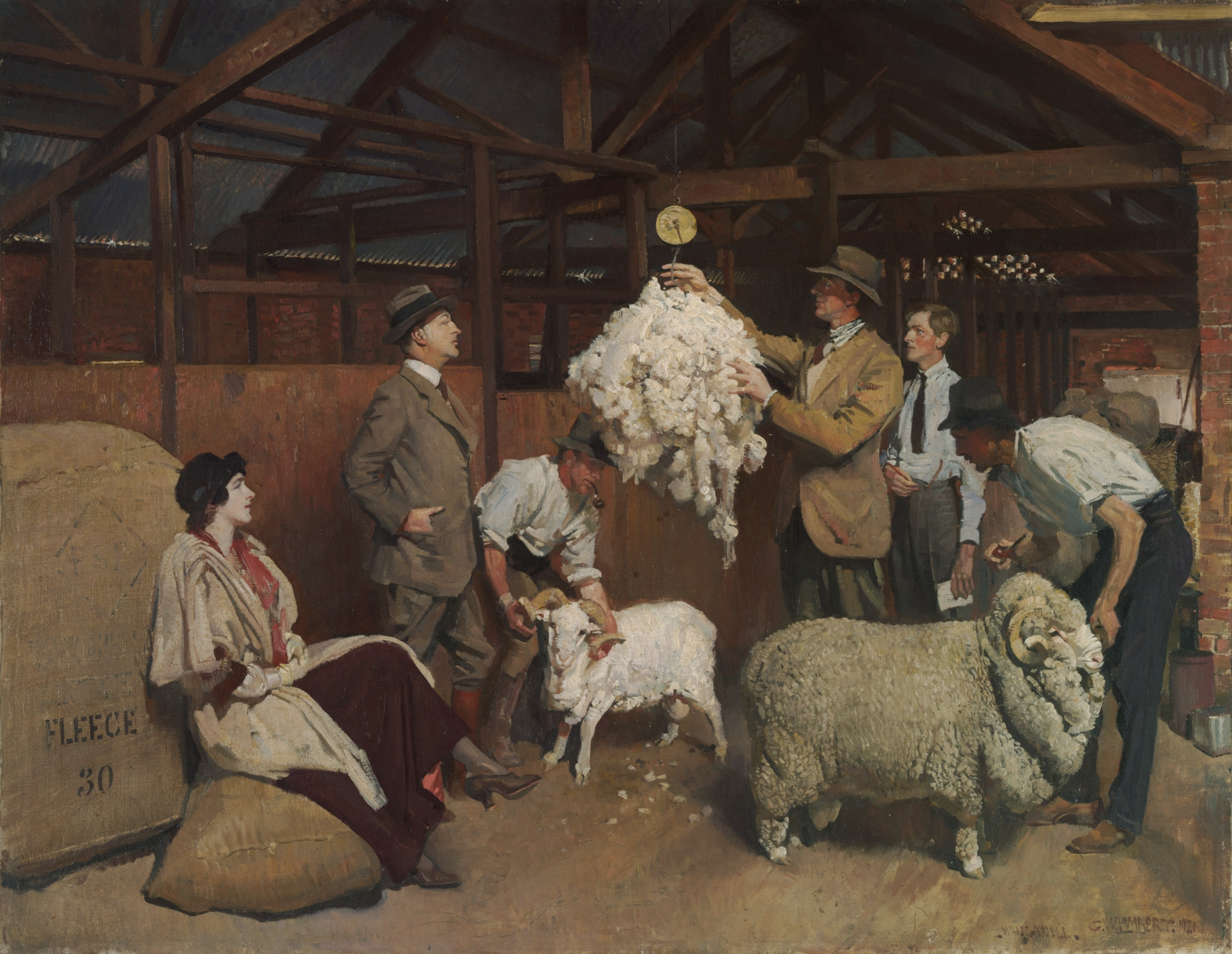
George Washington Lambert's Weighing the fleece (1921) has been called a riposte to Shearing the Rams.

It has been suggested that George Washington Lambert's 1921 work Weighing the fleece was conceived as a riposte to Shearing the Rams with Jim Davidson stating that "Certainly it could not be more different in spirit: instead of the celebration of strong masculine labour, [Weighing the fleece] endorses wealth and the social order." The photorealist painter Marcus Beilby won the 1987 Sir John Sulman Prize with a painting that also depicts shearers at work, this time in a modern shed using machine shears with overhead gear. Beilby was consciously inspired by Shearing the Rams when creating his own updated version, and gave his work the name Crutching the ewes to differentiate it, despite the fact that it does not depict men crutching sheep but rather shearing them.

The impact of Shearing of Rams can also be seen in Australian cinema. Shots of a shearing shed in The Squatter's Daughter (1933) bear a strong resemblance to the one in the painting. The cinematography of the Australian New Wave film Sunday Too Far Away (1975), set on an outback sheep station, was heavily influenced by Shearing the Rams, among other Australian paintings. The work inspired New Zealand author Stephen Daisley to write his 2015 historical novel Coming Rain.

After the shearing shed featured in the painting burned down in a bushfire in 1965, a replica was constructed by the local community on a nearby reserve. A re-enactment of the scene from the painting took place at North Tuppal station near Tocumwal, New South Wales in June 2010. Another life-size rendition of Shearing the Rams occurred in 2011 at Melbourne's Federation Square as part of the NGV's 150th anniversary celebrations.

== See also ==
- The Golden Fleece (1894), another shearing work by Roberts
- List of paintings by Tom Roberts
