= Andrew May (historian) =

Australian social historian (born 1963)

Andrew May FASSA FRAS
- Awards: H.J. Dyos Prize (1995)

Academic background
- Education: University of Melbourne (PhD)

Andrew May FASSA FRAS (born 1963) is an Australian social historian. He is a professor of Australian history in the School of Historical and Philosophical Studies of the University of Melbourne.

== Education and career ==
May has a D.Phil from the University of Melbourne.

He is producer of My Marvellous Melbourne, a podcast. He has curated a number of exhibitions at the City Gallery, Melbourne, including Read all about it! Melbourne's newsboys (2005); Flush! A quest for Melbourne's best public toilets in Art, Architecture & History (2006, with Kirsty Fletcher and Nicki Adams); Paper City: Logos Letterheads and Creative Designs (2011); and City Songs (2017, with Zoe Ali and Christos Tsiolkas).

He is lead investigator on a project titled Cancer Culture, funded by the Australian Research Council in partnership with Cancer Council Victoria.

He has been a historian member of the Heritage Council of Victoria since 2015, and deputy chair since 2020.

== Honours and recognition ==
He was elected a fellow of the Royal Asiatic Society of Great Britain and Ireland in 2013, and of the Academy of the Social Sciences in Australia in 2018.

== Books ==
As author:

- Melbourne Street Life (1998), Melbourne Scholarly Publishing ISBN 1875606467
- Espresso! Melbourne Coffee Stories (2001), Arcadia ISBN 9781740971324
- Federation Square (with Norman Day) (2003), Hardie Grant Books ISBN 1740663136
- Welsh Missionaries and British Imperialism: The Empire of Clouds in North-East India (2012), Manchester University Press ISBN 0719080355

As editor:

- The Living Heart: Images and Prospects for Central Melbourne (1993), Monash Publications in History ISBN 0732605105
- Evangelists of Empire?: Missionaries in Colonial History (with A. Barry, J. Cruikshank, P. Grimshaw) (2008), eScholarship Research Centre and The School of Historical Studies ISBN 9780734039682
- The Encyclopedia of Melbourne (with S. Swain), 2005, Cambridge University Press ISBN 0521842344
- Missionaries, Indigenous Peoples and Cultural Exchange (with P. Grimshaw), (2010), Sussex Academic Press ISBN 9781845193089
