= Weighing the Fleece =

1921 painting by George Washington Lambert

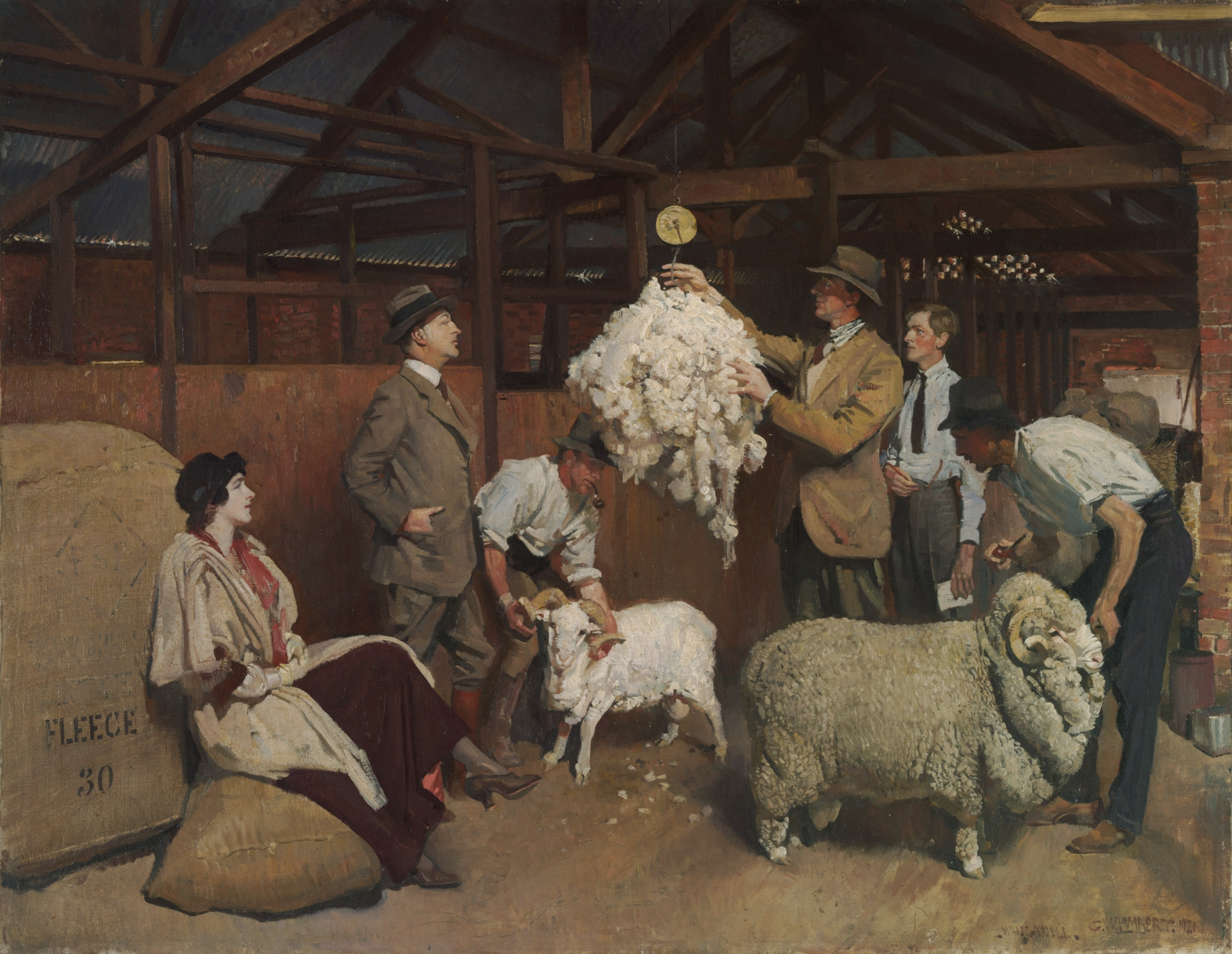
- Artist: George Washington Lambert
- Year: 1921
- Medium: oil on canvas
- Dimensions: 71.7 cm × 91.8 cm (28.2 in × 36.1 in)
- Location: National Gallery of Australia; Canberra
- Website: https://artsearch.nga.gov.au/detail.cfm?irn=43314

Weighing the Fleece is a 1921 painting by Australian artist George Washington Lambert. It is part of the collection of the National Gallery of Australia in Canberra.

== Composition ==
The painting depicts "the interior of a woolshed with the owner and his wife watching the fleece being weighed, a shorn stud ram and an unshorn one." The painting has a basic triangular form—"almost a frieze inside a pediment"—with the scales at the apex of the triangle.

The calibrating needle is followed by the eyes of all those present, save for the two men handling sheep. On one side of the scales stand the woolbuyer and his assistants, while on the other the dominant figures are the station owner and his wife. He has his hand half in pocket as he assumes a haughty mien — casual proprietorship — while his wife is placed, seated, on an adjacent bag of wool.

— Jim Davidson

Lambert claimed to have had the painting in mind for 25 years, a period that suggests it may be a riposte to Tom Roberts' Shearing the Rams. Jim Davidson stated that "Certainly it could not be more different in spirit: instead of the celebration of strong masculine labour, this painting endorses wealth and the social order."

Lambert painted the work in 8 days. Despite this Lambert was proud of the attention to detail in the work such as the "beams and the swallow droppings on the beams, corrugated iron, oil drum, kerosene tin, wool bale, brand on the wool bale" that created "a masterpiece of small portrait grouping".

== Provenance ==
The painting was commissioned by Leigh Sadlier Falkiner, the owner of Wanganella station, near Deniliquin in the Riverina region of New South Wales. The locality of Wanganella was later named for the station. Despite commissioning the work, Falkiner disliked the way he and his wife, Beatrice, were portrayed by Lambert and declined to purchase the painting. The painting was later sold to Sir Baldwin Spencer for £600.

It was acquired by the National Gallery of Australia in 1966.

== Reception ==
Contemporary critics were largely favourable of the painting, although some claimed it lacked emotion and sympathy for the subject.

The whole making a fine composition, which centres in the white fleece. Every detail of this picture shows an almost pre-Raphaelite care.

— The Argus, 15 September 1921
