= Federation Square =

Major public space and cultural precinct in Melbourne, Australia

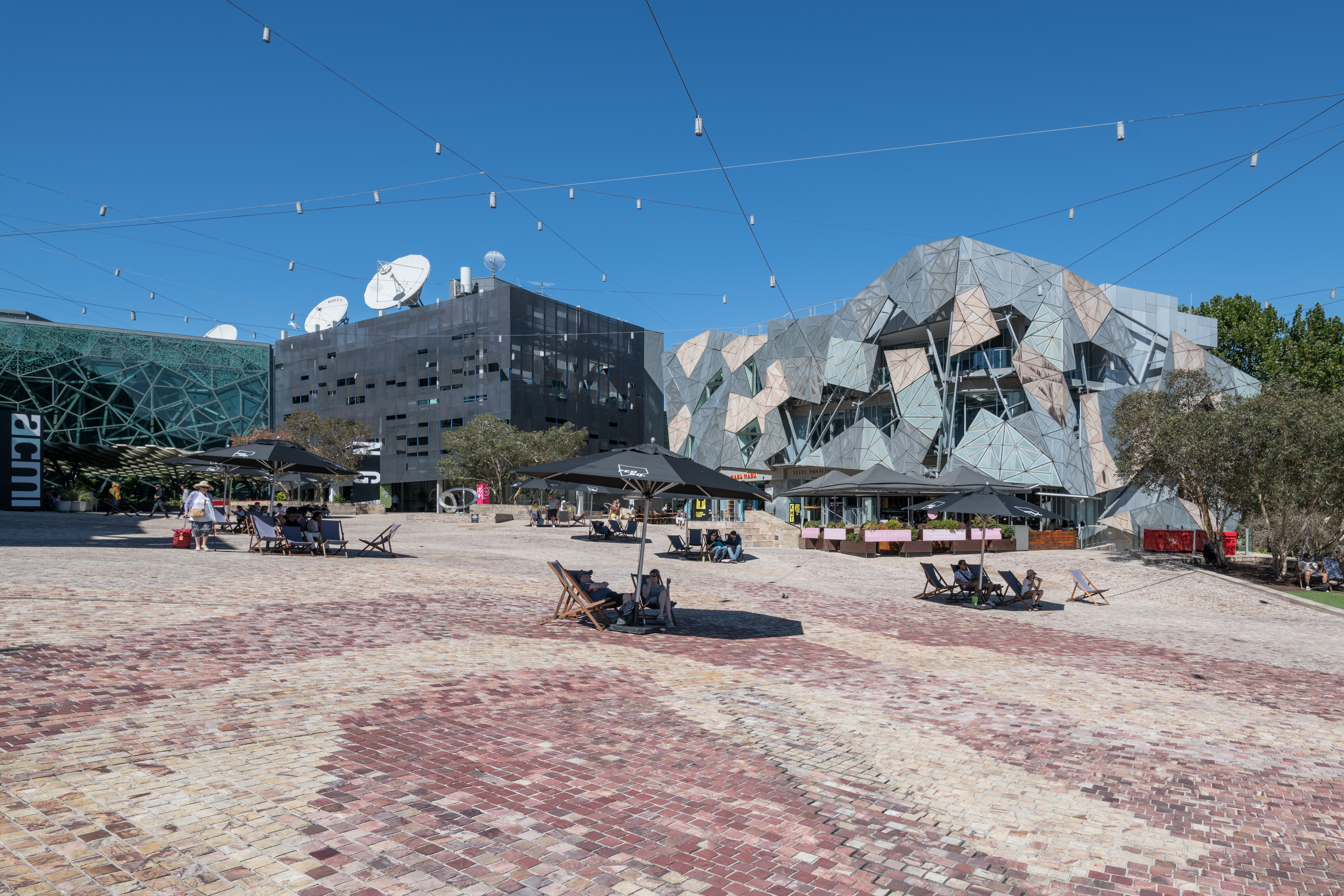
- Ground view of Federation Square, showing the common area, and the ACMI, NGV and SBS buildings
- Interactive map of Federation Square
- Type: Public space
- Location: Melbourne, Victoria, Australia
- Coordinates: 37.817798°S 144.968714°E
- Area: 3.2 ha (7.9 acres)
- Created: 26 October 2002
- Designer: Lab Architecture Studio; Bates Smart
- Operator: Fed Square Pty Ltd (State Trustees Ltd for State of Victoria)
- Visitors: 9.7 million per annum
- Open: All year
- Public transit: Flinders Street, Town Hall; Federation Square/Swanston St (#13): 1, 3, 5, 6, 16, 64, 67, 72
- Website: fedsquare.com

Victorian Heritage Register
- Official name: Federation Square
- Type: State Registered Place
- Criteria: a, d, e, f, g
- Designated: 12 September 2019
- Reference no.: H2390

Federation Square (marketed and colloquially known as Fed Square) is a venue for arts, culture and public events on the edge of the Melbourne central business district. It covers an area of 3.2 ha (7.9 acres) at the intersection of Flinders and Swanston Streets built above busy railway lines and across the road from Flinders Street station. It incorporates major cultural institutions such as the Ian Potter Centre, Australian Centre for the Moving Image (ACMI) and the Koorie Heritage Trust as well as cafes and bars in a series of buildings centred around a large paved square, and a glass walled atrium.

== History ==
=== Background ===
Melbourne's central city grid was originally designed without a central public square, long seen as a missing element. From the 1920s there were proposals to roof the railway yards on the southeast corner of Flinders and Swanston Streets for a public square, with more detailed proposals prepared in the 1950s and 1960s. In the 1960s, the Melbourne City Council decided that the best place for the City Square was the corner of Swanston and Collins Streets, opposite the town hall. The first temporary square opened in 1968, and a permanent version opened in 1981. It was however not considered a great success, and was redeveloped in the 1990s as a smaller, simpler space in front of a new large hotel.

Meanwhile, in the late 1960s, a small part of the railway lines had been partly roofed by the construction of the Princes Gate Towers, colloquially known as the "Gas & Fuel Buildings" after their major tenant, the Gas and Fuel Corporation, over the old Princes Bridge station. This included a plaza on the corner, which was elevated above the street and little used. Between the plaza and Batman Avenue, which ran along the north bank of the Yarra River, were the extensive Jolimont Railway Yards, and the through train lines running into Flinders Street station under Swanston Street.

In 1978 the idea of roofing the railyards was again proposed as part of a State Government competition for a landmark, asking for “an idea, a word, image or plan” to put Melbourne on the map. It drew 2300 entries, but no winner was declared.

=== Design competition and controversy ===
In 1996 the Premier Jeff Kennett announced that the Gas & Fuel Buildings would be demolished, and the railyards roofed, and a complex including arts facilities and a large public space would be built. It was to be named Federation Square, and opened in time to celebrate the centenary of Australia's Federation in 2001, and would include performing arts facilities, a gallery, a cinemedia centre, the public space, a glazed wintergarden, and ancillary cafe and retail spaces. An architectural design competition was announced that received 177 entries from around the world. Five designs were shortlisted, which included entries from high-profile Melbourne architects Denton Corker Marshall and Ashton Raggatt McDougall, and lesser known Sydney architect Chris Elliott, and London based architects Jenny Lowe and Adrian Hawker. The jury was chaired by Professor Neville Quarry. The winner announced on 28 July 1997, a consortium led by Lab Architecture Studio directed by Donald Bates and Peter Davidson from London, with the Dutch landscape architects Karres en Brands, directed by Sylvia Karres and Bart Brands, teamed with local executive architects Bates Smart for the second stage.

The design, originally costed at between $110 and $150 million, was complex and irregular, with gently angled 'cranked' geometries predominating in both the planning and the facade treatment of the various buildings and the wintergardens that surrounded and defined the open spaces. A series of 'shards' provided vertical accents, while interconnected laneways and stairways and the wintergarden would connect Flinders Street to the Yarra River. The open square was arranged as a gently sloping amphitheatre, focussed on a large viewing screen for public events, with a secondary sloped plaza area on the main corner. The design was widely supported by the design community but was less popular with the public. The design was also soon criticised when it was realised that the western freestanding 'shard' would block views of the south front of St Paul's Cathedral from Princes Bridge.

The mix of occupants and tenants were soon modified, with the cinemedia centre becoming the new body known as ACMI, offices for multicultural broadcaster SBS added, and the gallery space becoming the Australian art wing of the National Gallery of Victoria, which became the Ian Potter Centre. The performance arts space was dropped, the number of commercial tenancies increased, and the south end of the Atrium became an auditorium. A new substantially rearranged design incorporating the new program was revealed in late 1998.

=== Construction ===
After the 1999 state election, while construction was well underway, the incoming Bracks Government ordered a report by the University of Melbourne's Professor Evan Walker into the 'western shard' to be located on the corner of Flinders and Swanston Streets, which concluded in February 2000 that the "heritage vista" towards St Paul's cathedral should be preserved, and the shard be no more than 8m in height.

Budgets on the project blew out significantly due to the initial cost being seriously underestimated, given the expense of covering the railyards, changes to the brief, the need to resolve construction methods for the angular design, and the long delays. Among measures taken to cut costs was concreting areas originally designed for paving.

The final cost of construction was approximately $467 million (over four times the original estimate), the main funding primarily from the state government, with $64 million from the City of Melbourne, some from the federal government, while private operators and sponsors paid for fitouts or naming rights.

The square was opened on 26 October 2002. Unlike many Australian landmarks, it was not opened by the reigning monarch, Elizabeth II, nor was she invited to its unveiling; she visited Federation Square in October 2011.

=== Further expansion ===
In 2006, Federation Wharf redeveloped the vaults under Princes Walk (a former roadway) into a large bar, with extensive outdoor areas on the Yarra riverbank, with elevator access to Federation Square.

Several proposals have been prepared for the area known as Federation Square East, the remaining area of railyards to the east. There have been proposals for office towers and, more recently, a combination of open space and a hotel, or another campus for the National Gallery of Victoria to house their contemporary art collection.

=== Apple Store ===
In December 2017, the Andrews government announced that one of the buildings of the square, the Birrarung Building, would be demolished to make way for a freestanding Apple Store, generating strong criticism over the commercial use of a cultural space. Opposition groups including Our City Our Square and the National Trust of Australia (Victoria) then nominated Fed Square to the Victorian Heritage Register, which resulted in an interim decision to list in October 2018. Apple cancelled the plans in April 2019 after the application to Heritage Victoria to demolish the Birrarung Building was denied, and after a hearing, the square was formally listed in August 2019.

=== Metro Entrance ===
With the construction of the upcoming Melbourne Metro Tunnel, an entrance to the underground Town Hall station from the corner of Federation Square was proposed, with a design released in December 2018 that would replace the corner Information Centre. After the heritage listing of the square, a permit was sought to demolish the building and the plaza around it, which was granted on the basis that the Information Centre was not the original design for the 'Western Shard', and it was demolished by January 2019, though without a final approved design for the new entrance.

=== Later Developments ===
In early 2022, following the decision to build a new National Gallery Victoria Contemporary behind the NGV, with a linear public space connection through to St Kilda Road, the State Government established the Melbourne Arts Precinct Corporation to manage the delivery of the new park, the management of Federation Square, and to better connect the various arts institutions in Southbank to each other and through to the CBD.

In October 2023 the Age newspaper ran a series of articles on the square, providing a range of opinions on its strengths and weaknesses. The failure of many cafes and shops over the years was noted, as well as the rough surface affecting mobility, the lack of shade, and the lack of clear paths through the site, concluding that the square was still a 'work in progress'.

== Location and layout ==
Federation Square occupies roughly a whole urban block bounded by Swanston, Flinders, and Russell Streets and the Yarra River. The open public square is directly opposite Flinders Street station and St Paul's Cathedral. The layout of the precinct is designed to connect the historical central district of the city with the Yarra River and a new park Birrarung Marr.

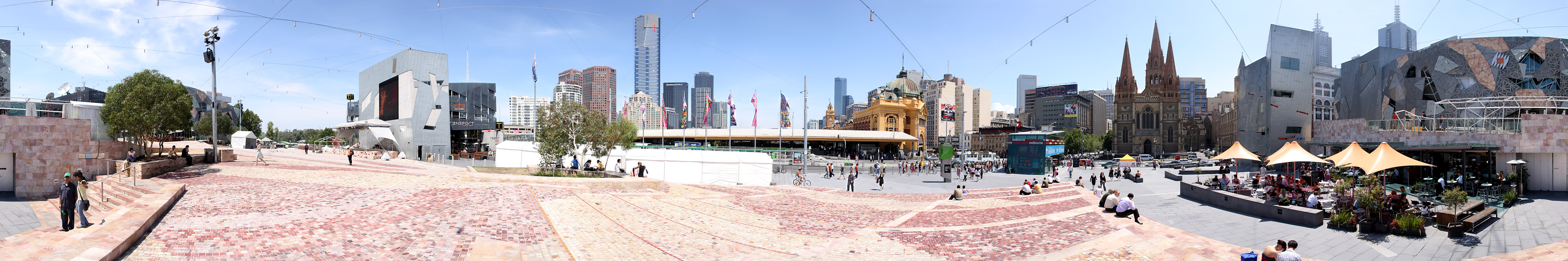
360° panorama

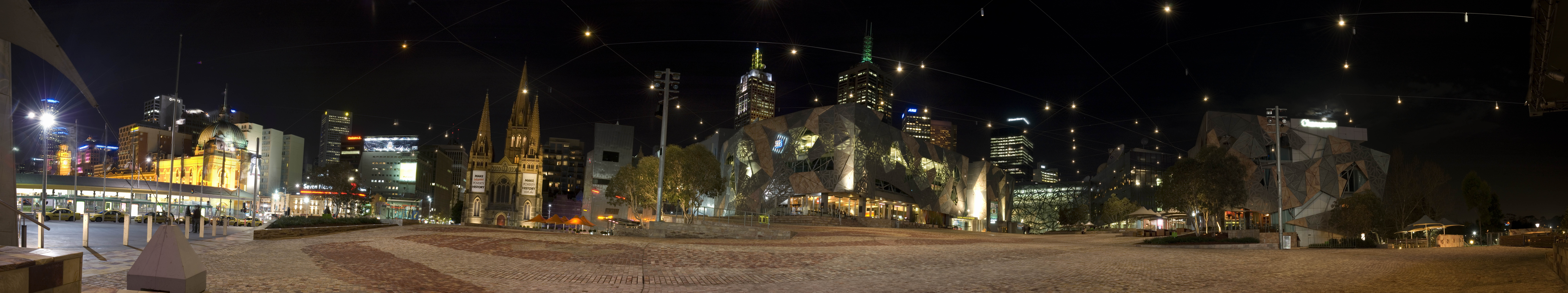
Night view

== Design features ==
=== Square ===
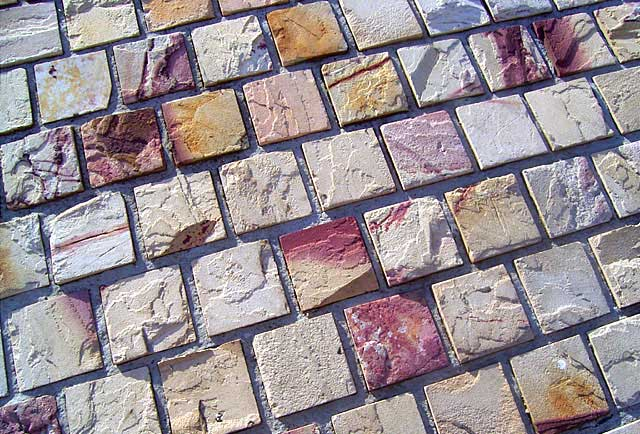
Main square paving.

The complex of buildings forms a rough U-shape around the main open-air square, oriented to the west. The eastern end of the square is formed by the glazed walls of The Atrium. While bluestone is used for the majority of the paving in the Atrium and St Paul's Court, matching footpaths elsewhere in central Melbourne, the main square is paved in 470,000 ochre-coloured sandstone blocks from Western Australia and invokes images of the outback. The paving is designed as a huge urban artwork, called Nearamnew, by Paul Carter and gently rises above street level, containing a number of textual pieces inlaid in its undulating surface.

There are a small number of landscaped sections in the square and plaza which are planted with Eucalyptus trees.

=== Plaza and giant screen ===
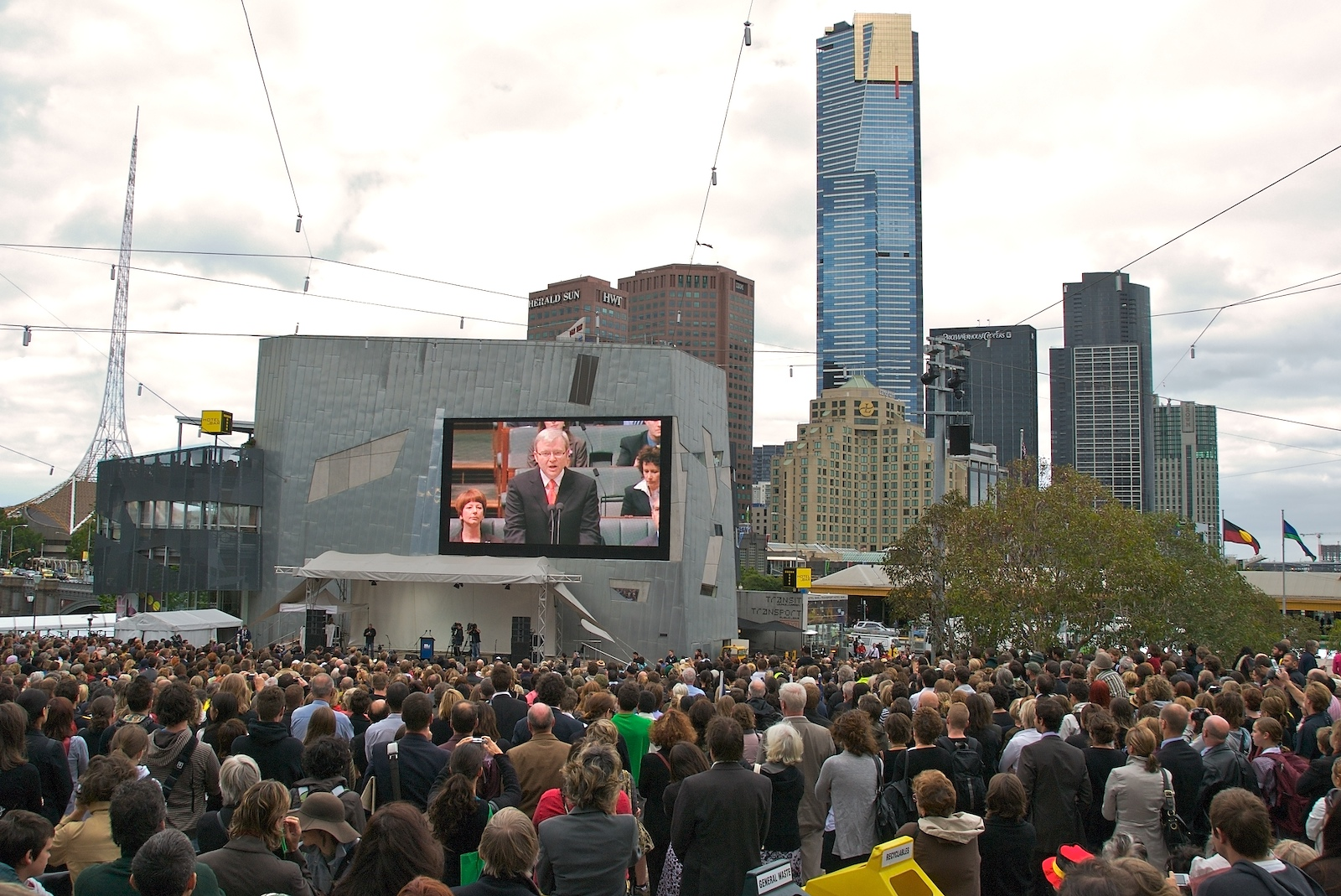
The large screen is used for public events. Pictured is a telecast of Kevin Rudd's parliamentary apology to the stolen generations.

A key part of the plaza design is its large and fixed public television screen, which has been used to broadcast major sporting events such as the AFL Grand Final and the Australian Open every year. It is currently the biggest broadcasting screen in Australia.

=== Buildings ===
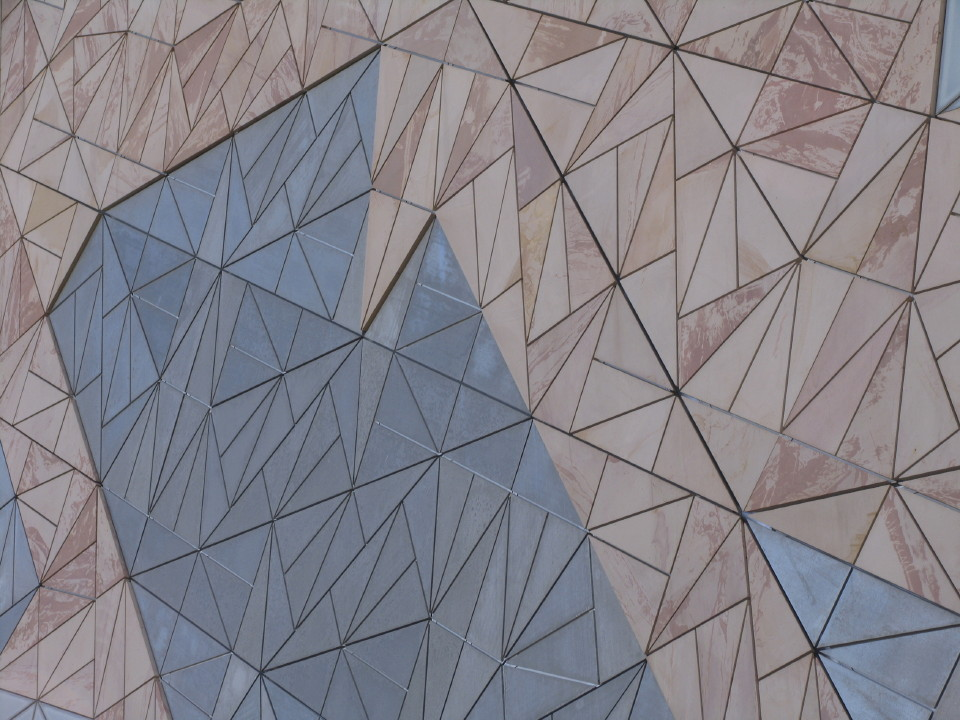
Building façades clad using pinwheel tiling

The architecture of the square is in the deconstructivist style, with both plan and elevations designed around slightly angular, 'cranked' geometries, rather than tradition orthogonal grids. The built forms are mainly slightly bent north–south volumes, separated by glazed gaps, a reference to traditional Melbourne laneways, with vertical 'shards', attached or freestanding, containing discrete functions like the Visitor's Centre, or lifts and stairs.

The larger built volumes are relatively simple reinforced concrete buildings with glass walls, but with a second outer skin of cladding carried on heavy steel framing, folded and stepped slightly to create angular undulating surfaces. The cladding is composed of 6 different materials, zinc, perforated zinc, glass, frosted glass, sandstone and no cladding, in a camouflage-like pattern, and created using pinwheel tiling. The 'crossbar' is an east–west built from that runs through the long gallery building, and is clad in perforated black steel panels.

Some buildings are named. The building along Flinders Street that houses ACMI and SBS is named the Alfred Deakin Building, the building between the plaza space and the river is called the Birrarung Building, while the building that houses the NGV Australia is also called the Ian Potter Centre.

=== Shards ===
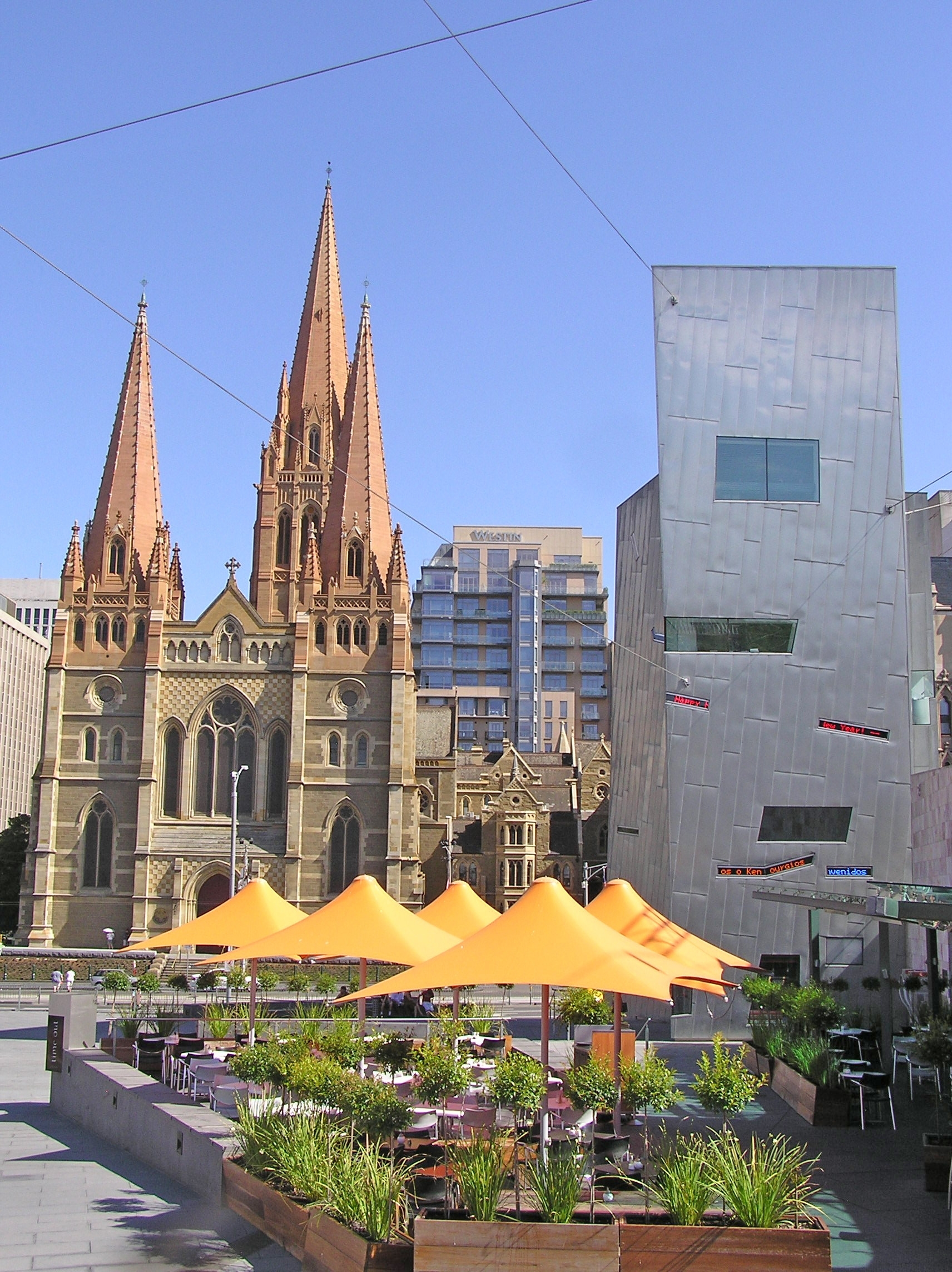
St Paul's Cathedral and the eastern shard.

Three shards frame the square space. The eastern and southern shards are completely clad in metallic surfaces with angular slots, very similar in design to the Jewish Museum Berlin, while the western shard is clad in glass. Adjoined to the southern shard is a hotel which features the wrap around metallic screen and glass louvers.

=== Laneways ===
There are a number of unnamed laneways in the Federation Square complex which connect it to both Flinders Street and the Yarra River via stairways. The stairways between the Western Shard and nearby buildings are also paved in larger flat rectangle sandstone blocks.

=== Riverfront ===
The riverfront areas extend south to an elevated pedestrian promenade which was once part of Batman Avenue and is lined with tall established trees of both deciduous exotic species and Australian eucalyptus. More recently, the vaults adjacent to the Princes Bridge have been converted into Federation Wharf, a series of cafes and boat berths. Some of the areas between the stairs and lanes leading to the river are landscaped with shady tree ferns.

=== Atrium ===
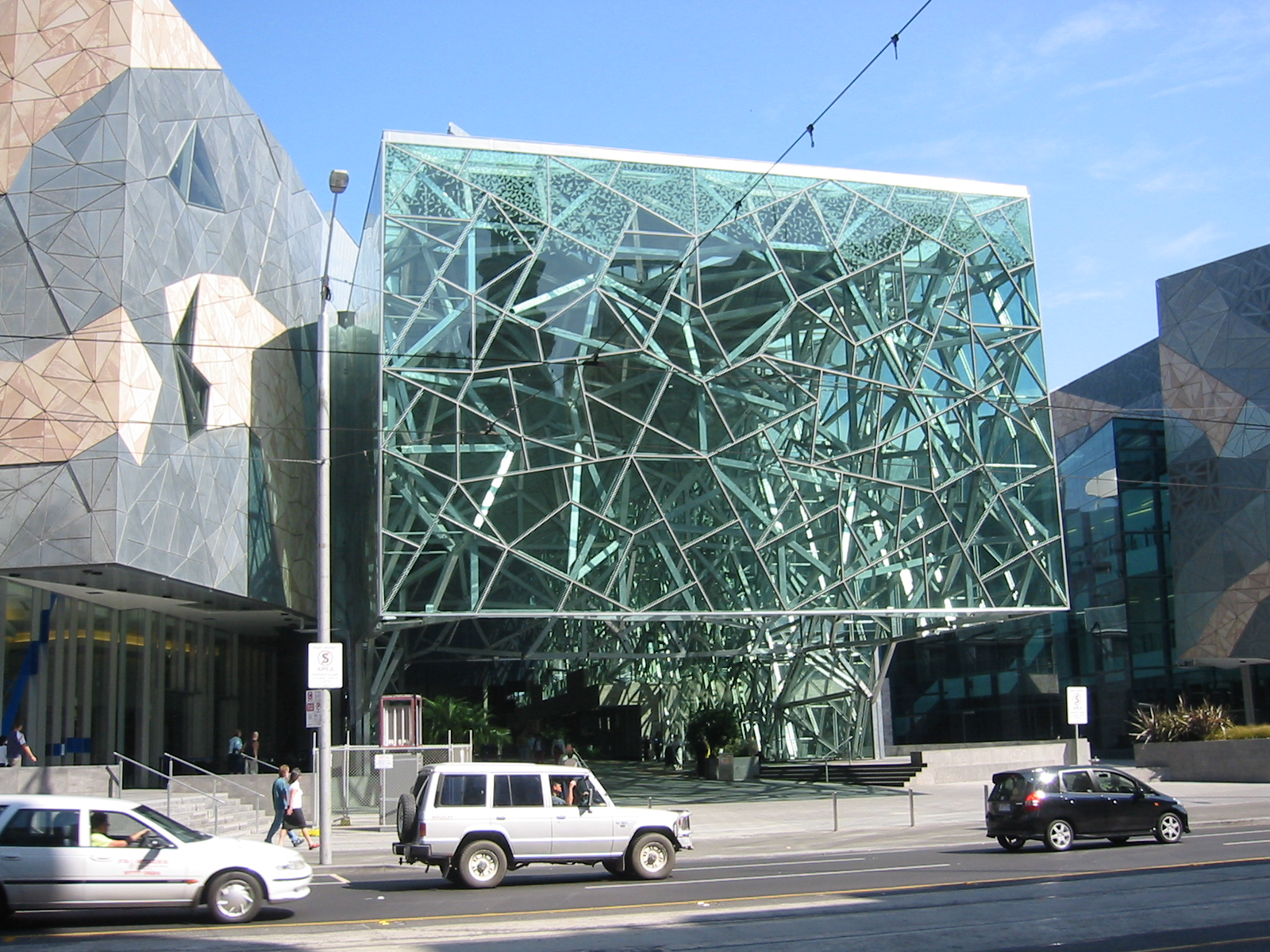
Glass walls of the atrium space.

The "atrium" is one of the major public spaces in the precinct. It is a laneway-like space, five stories high with glazed walls and roof. The exposed metal structure and glazing patterns follow the pinwheel tiling pattern used elsewhere in the precinct's building facades.

=== Labyrinth ===
The "labyrinth" is a passive cooling system sandwiched above the railway lines and below the middle of the square. The concrete structure consists of 1.2 km of interlocking, honeycombed walls. It covers 1600 m^{2}. The walls have a corrugated profile to maximize their surface area, and are spaced 60 cm apart.

During summer nights, cold air is pumped in the combed space, cooling down the concrete, while heat absorbed during the day is pumped out. The following day, cold air is pumped from the labyrinth out into the atrium through floor vents. This process can keep the atrium up to 12 °C cooler than outside. This is comparable to conventional air conditioning, but using one-tenth the energy and producing one-tenth the carbon dioxide.

During winter, the process is reversed, storing warm daytime air in the Labyrinth overnight, and pumping it back into the atrium during the day.

The system can also partly cool the ACMI building when the power is not required by the atrium.

=== Flagpoles ===
In the Federation Square complex, there are a number of flagpoles, most notably a group of four, three of which permanently fly the Australian, Aboriginal, and Torres Strait Islander flags. The fourth flagpole occasionally flies the flag of a foreign country to celebrate a national holiday of that country, for example an independence day. Prior to 2022 foreign countries' flags were usually flown on a group of eight flagpoles located next to a bus stop.

The following countries' flags have been raised at Federation Square and/or its surroundings at least once:

- Albania
- Argentina
- Azerbaijan
- Bangladesh
- Belgium
- Bhutan
- Bosnia and Herzegovina
- Botswana
- Canada
- Chile
- Croatia
- Cyprus
- Denmark
- Djibouti
- Ecuador
- El Salvador
- Eritrea
- Finland
- France
- Germany
- Greece
- Haiti
- Hungary
- India
- Indonesia
- Iran
- Israel
- Italy
- Japan
- Kosovo
- Lithuania
- Malawi
- Malaysia
- Maldives
- Malta
- Mauritius
- Mexico
- Morocco
- Nepal
- Netherlands
- North Macedonia
- Norway
- Pakistan
- Palestine
- Peru
- Philippines
- Poland
- Portugal
- Rwanda
- Serbia
- Singapore
- Slovenia
- Somalia
- South Africa
- Spain
- Sri Lanka
- Switzerland
- Turkey
- Ukraine
- United Kingdom
- United States of America
- Venezuela

== Facilities and tenants ==
In addition to a number of shops, bars, cafés and restaurants, Federation Square's cultural facilities include:

=== Melbourne Visitor Centre ===
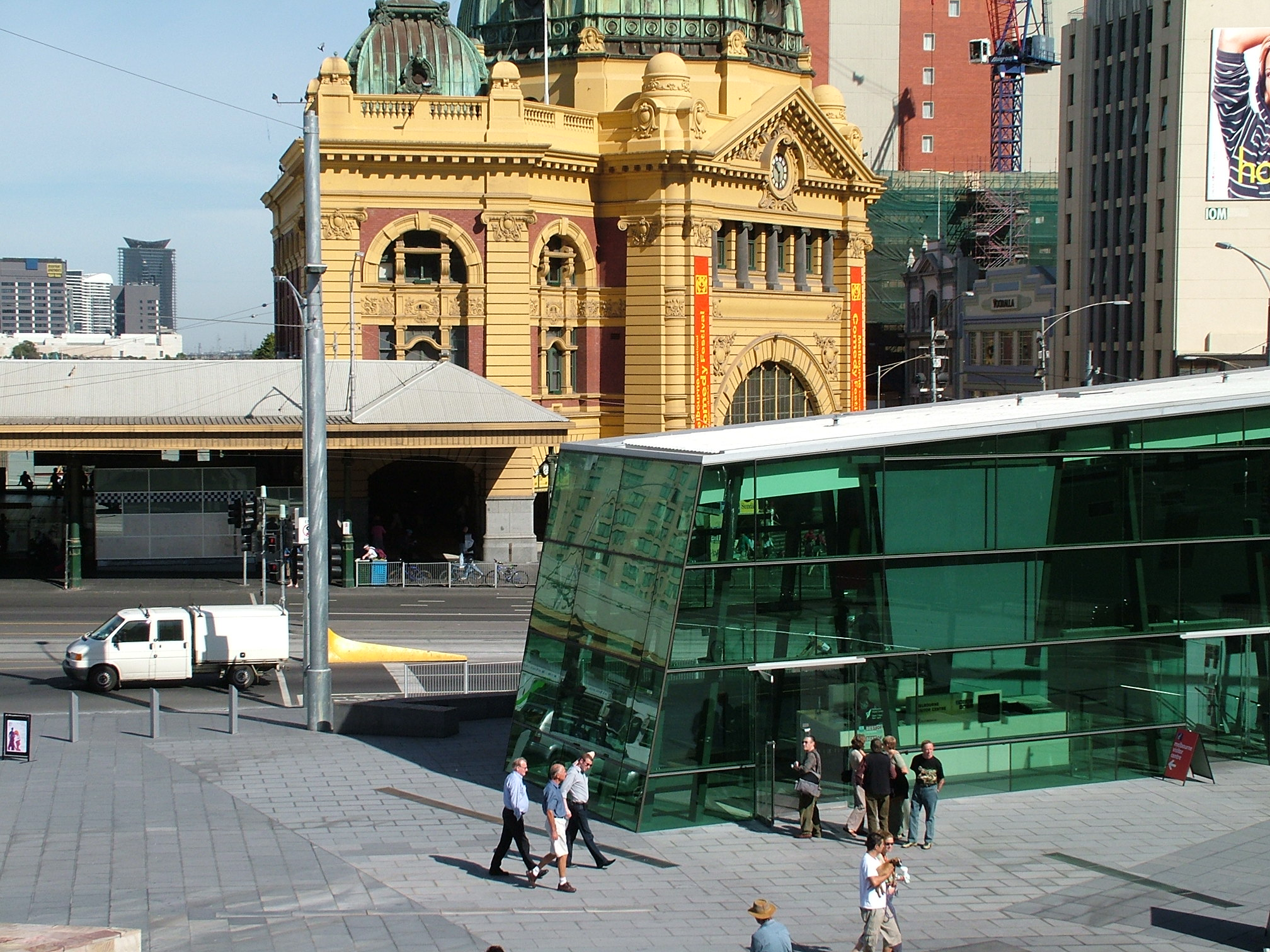
Flinders Street station and the stunted glass Western Shard, entry to the Melbourne Visitor Centre.

The Melbourne Visitor Centre was located underground, with its entrance at the main corner shard directly opposite Flinders Street Station and St Paul's Cathedral and its exit at the opposite shard. The Visitor Centre was intended to replace a facility which was previously located at the turn of the 19th-century town hall administration buildings on Swanston Street. The Visitors Centre was demolished in December 2018 to make way for an entrance to the rapid transit station to be built under the Swanston Street, and the visitors centre returned to the Town Hall.

=== The Edge ===
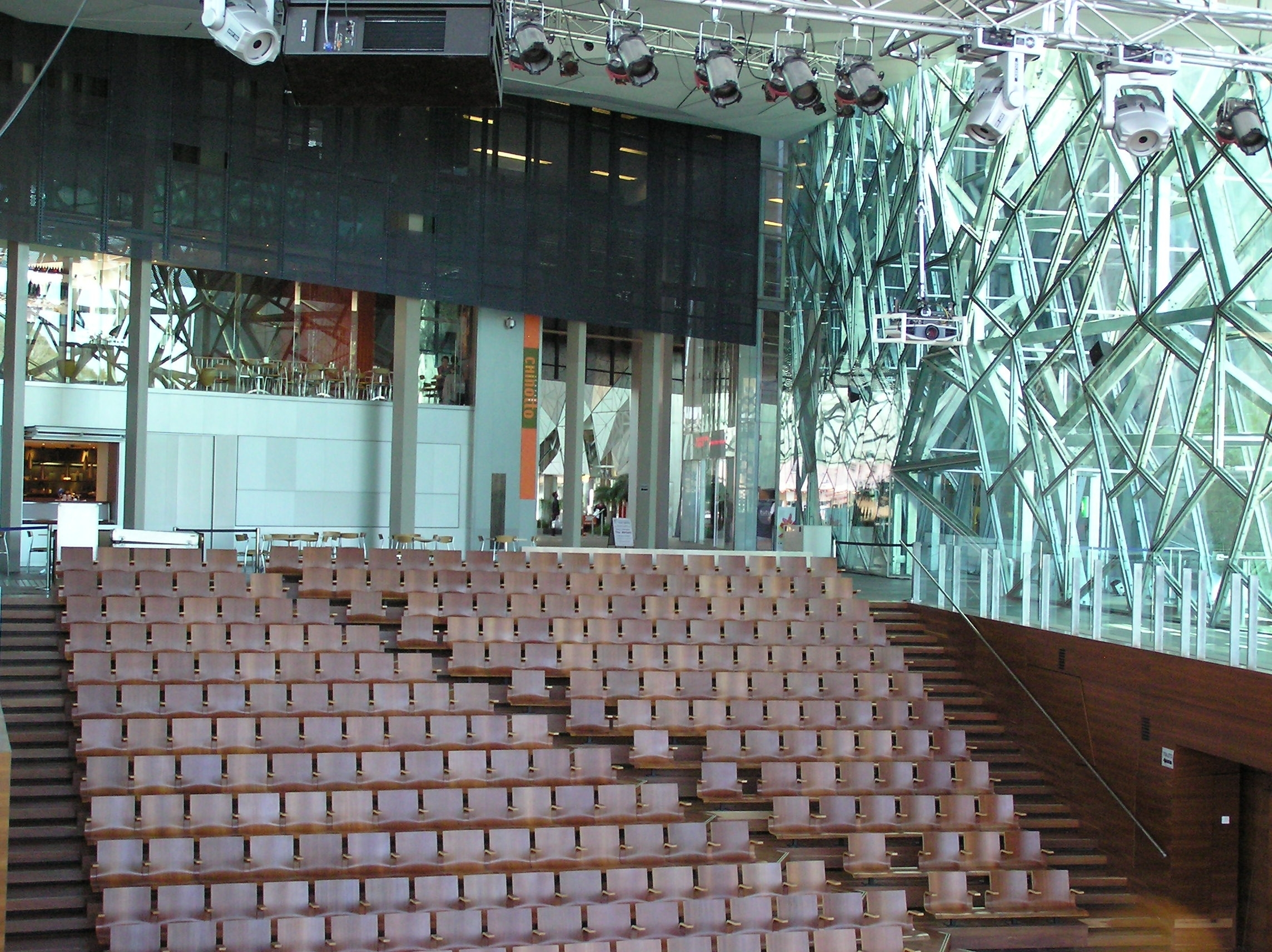
The Edge Theatre seating.

The Edge theatre is a 450-seat space designed to have views of the Yarra River and across to the spire of The Arts Centre. The theatre is lined in wood veneer in similar geometrical patterns to other interiors in the complex. The Edge was named "The BMW Edge" until May 2013, when a new sponsorship deal with Deakin University caused it to be renamed "The Deakin Edge" until 2021.

=== Zinc ===
Zinc is a function space underneath the gallery building, and opens onto the Yarra river bank. It was intended as an entirely commercial part of the development of Federation Square, and is used for wedding receptions, corporate events, launches, and the like.

=== National Gallery of Victoria ===
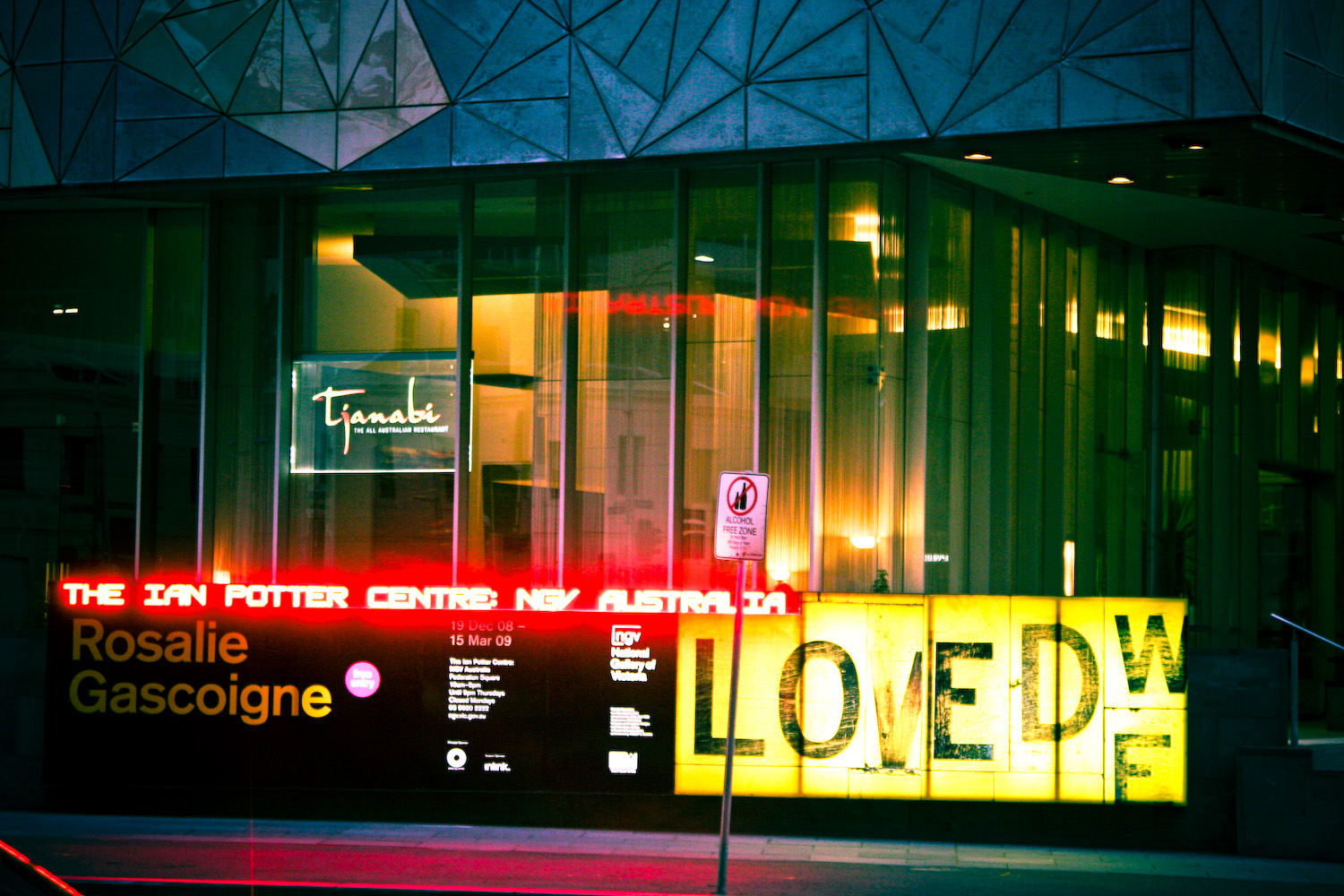
Ian Potter Centre entry.

The Ian Potter Centre, also known as the NGVA, houses the Australian part of the art collection of the National Gallery of Victoria (NGV), in the building along the eastern side. (The St Kilda Rd building now houses that International works of the NGV, and is known as the NGVI). There are over 20,000 Australian artworks, including paintings, sculpture, photography, fashion and textiles, and the collection is the oldest and most well known in the country.

Well-known works at the Ian Potter Centre include Frederick McCubbin's Pioneers (1904) and Tom Roberts' Shearing the Rams (1890). Also featured are works from Sidney Nolan, John Perceval, Margaret Preston and Fred Williams. Indigenous art includes works by William Barak and Emily Kngwarreye.

The National Gallery at Federation Square also features the NGV Kids Corner, which is an interactive education section aimed at small children and families, and the NGV Studio.

=== ACMI (Australian Centre for the Moving Image) ===
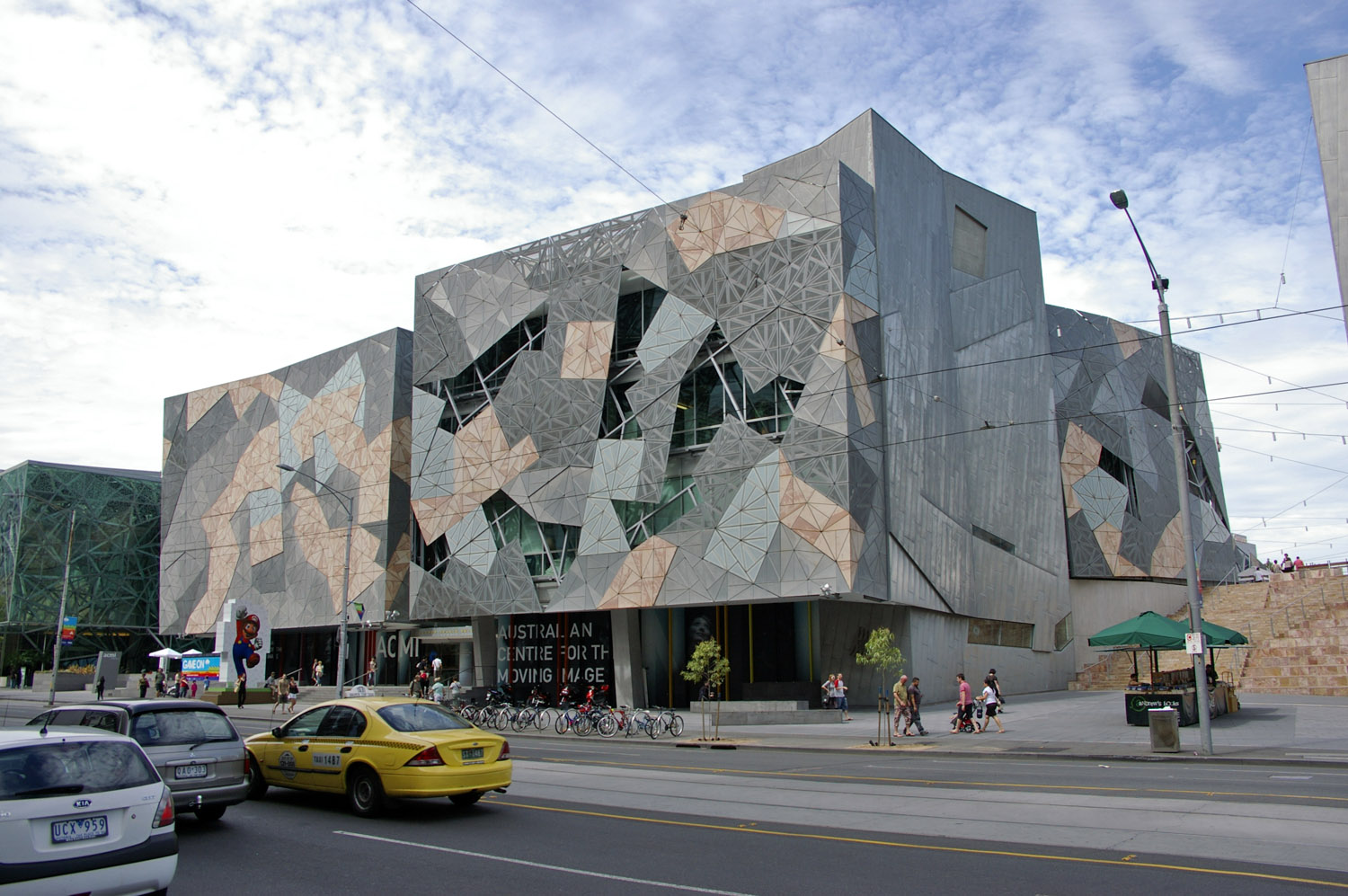
The Alfred Deakin Building houses the Australian Centre for the Moving Image.

The Australian Centre for the Moving Image known as ACMI has two cinemas that are equipped to play every film, video and digital video format, with attention to high-quality acoustics. The screen gallery, built along the entire length of what was previously a train station platform, is a subterranean gallery for experimentation with the moving image. Video art, installations, interactives, sound art and net art are all regularly exhibited in this space. Additional venues within ACMI allow computer-based public education, and other interactive presentations.

In 2003, ACMI commissioned SelectParks to produce an interactive game-based, site-specific installation called AcmiPark, which replicated and abstracted the real-world architecture of Federation Square. It also houses highly innovative mechanisms for interactive, multi-player sound and musical composition.

=== Transport Hotel Bar ===
Transport hotel and bar is a three-level hotel complex adjacent to the southern shard on the south western corner of the square. It has a ground-floor public bar, restaurant and cocktail lounge on the rooftop.

=== SBS Radio and Television offices ===
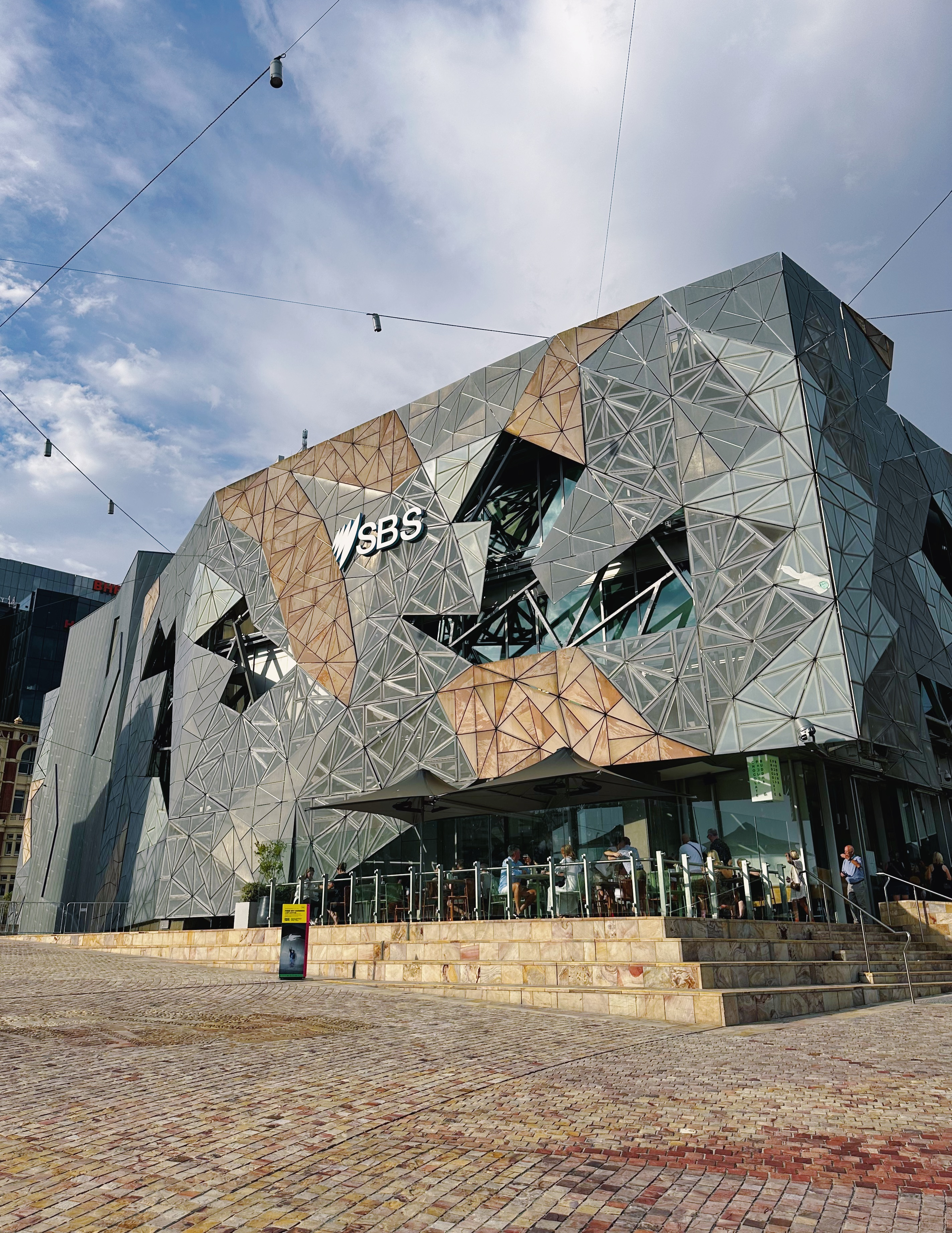
The Alfred Deakin Building houses offices for SBS.

The Melbourne offices of the Special Broadcasting Service (SBS), one of Australia's two publicly funded national broadcasters, is in the Deakin Building on Flinders Street.

=== Beer awards ===
Federation Square has recently become home to several beer award shows, and tastings, including the Australian International Beer Awards trade and public shows, as well as other similar events such as showcases of local and other Australian breweries. These events have been held in the square's outdoor area the Atrium and usually require an entry fee in exchange for a set number of tastings.

=== Past tenants ===
Past tenants have included:

- "Champions", The Australian Racing Museum & Hall of Fame — Relocated to Melbourne Cricket Ground.
- National Design Centre — Relocated to National Gallery of Victoria

== Reception and recognition ==
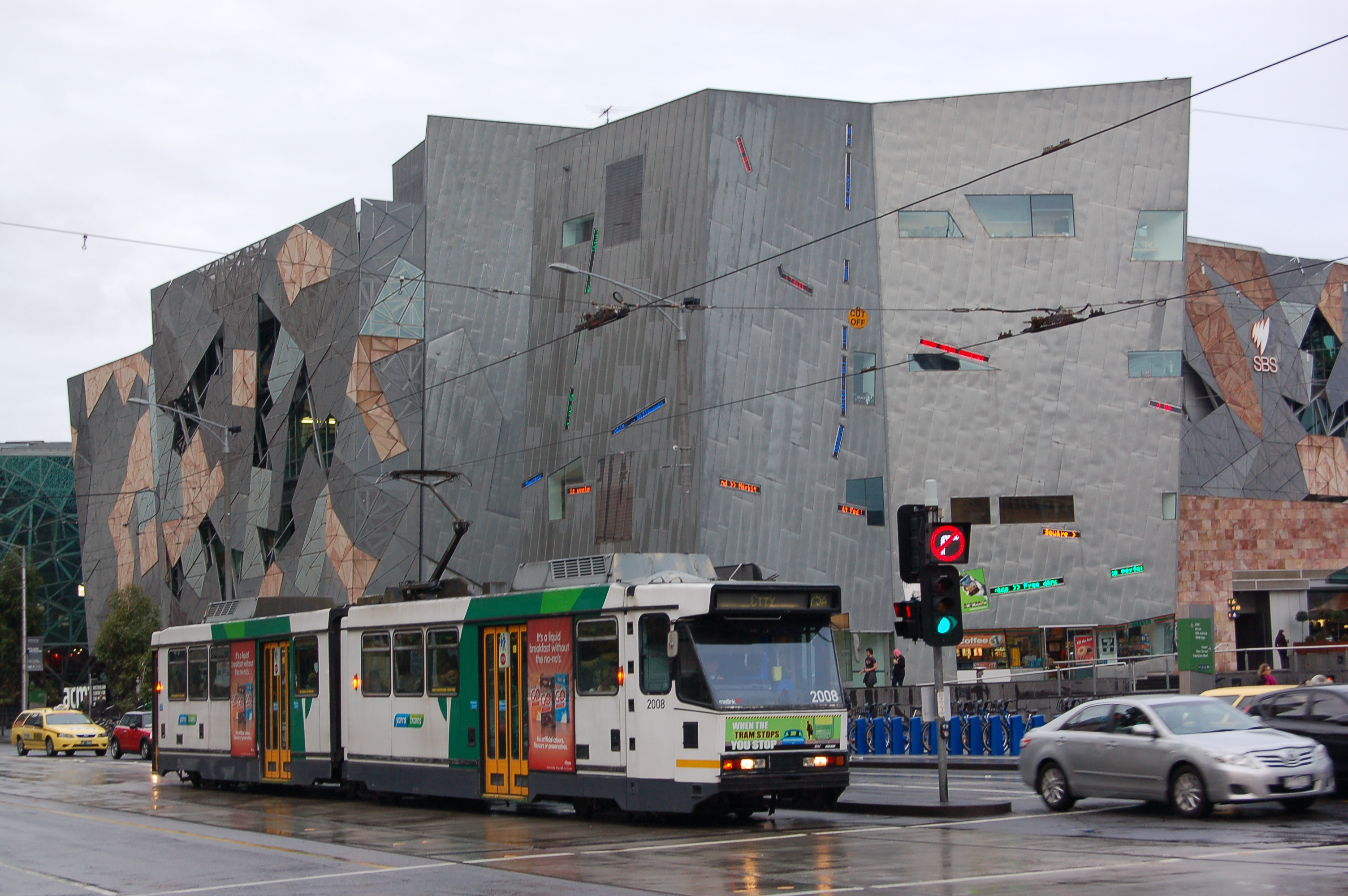
A tram on Flinders Street, with the East Shard and the ACMI building in the background.

In 2009, Virtual Tourist awarded Federation Square with the title of the 'World's Fifth Ugliest Building'. Criticisms of it ranged from its damage to the heritage vista to its similarity to a bombed-out war-time bunker due to its "army camouflage" colours. A judge from Virtual Tourist justified Federation Square's ranking on the ugly list claiming that: "Frenzied and overly complicated, the chaotic feel of the complex is made worse by a web of unsightly wires from which overhead lights dangle." It continues to be a 'pet hate' of Melburnians and was discussed on ABC's Art Nation.

After its opening on 26 October 2002, Federation Square remained controversial among Melburnians due to its unpopular architecture, but also because of its successive cost blowouts and construction delays (as its name suggests, it was to have opened in time for the centenary of Australian Federation on 1 January 2001). The construction manager was Multiplex.

The designers of Federation Square did not get any work for six months after the completion of the A$450 million public space, but did receive hate-mail from people who disliked the design.

The Australian Financial Review later reported that some Melburnians have learned to love the building, citing the record number of people using and visiting it. In 2005 it was included on The Atlantic Cities' 2011 list of "10 Great Central Plazas and Squares".

== Architecture and Urban Design Awards ==
At the Victorian State Architecture Awards held in June 2003, Federation Square was awarded the prestigious Victorian Architecture Medal, the Melbourne Prize and the Joseph Reed Award for Urban Design by the Victorian Chapter of the Royal Australian Institute of Architects.

In November 2003, the project won the Walter Burley Griffin Award for Urban Design and the Interior Architecture Award for The Ian Potter Centre: NGV Australia (Federation Square) at the National Awards of the Royal Australian Institute of Architects.

Other awards

- 2003 — IDAA Public/Institutional Interior Design Award
- 2003 — Australian Institute of Landscape Architects Award for Design Excellence
- 2003 — Civic Trust Award
- 2003 — Mahony Griffin Award for Interior Architecture
- 2003 — Interior Design Awards Australia
- 2003 — Victorian and Tasmanian Award for Excellence for Design in Landscape Architecture
- 2003 — Dulux Interior Colour Award
- 2003 — Public Domain Award For Sustainability
- 2003 — Kenneth Brown Award Hawaii, Commendation for Asia Pacific Architecture
- 2005 — Urban Land Institute Award for Excellence: Asia Pacific USA, Best Public Project
- 2006 — Chicago Athenaeum International Architecture Awards USA

== See also ==
- Australian landmarks
- Lab Architecture Studio
