= Lab Architecture Studio =

LAB Architecture Studio was a firm of architects and urban designers based in Melbourne, Australia with international offices in London and Shanghai.

== Directors ==
Peter Davidson after graduating from Bachelor of Architecture in 1980 from the NSW Institute of Technology, Sydney, moved to London in 1981 where he became editorial assistant for the journal International Architect. Whilst running his own practice for ten years, Davidson was also teaching at various institutions, including the Architectural Association School of Architecture where he met fellow design director of LAB Donald Bates. Davidson suffered a severe stroke in 2010 and has no involvement with Lab Architecture Studio.

Donald Bates completed his bachelor's degree of architecture in 1978 from the University of Houston, Texas and received his masters of Architecture in 1983 at the Cranbrook Academy of Art. Bates was the associate architect to Daniel Libeskind for the Berlin: city edge competition entry as well as the Berlin Museum extension Competition entry, now also known as the Jewish Museum Berlin. After business partner Peter Davidson suffered a severe stroke in 2010, Bates was accused of forgoing his partner's physical, emotional and financial well-being. Quoted in The Age, Nina Libeskind referred to Bates' "Cynical opportunism and expediency". In 2012 Bates was appointed chair of architectural design at the University of Melbourne.

== Awards ==
=== International awards ===
- 2008 Mipim AR Future Project Award, commended
- 2003 FX International Interior Design awards London, Best Museum category
- 2007 Cityscape Architectural Review Awards, Commercial Built and Community Future Category, Shortlist
- 2003 Kenneth Brown Award Hawaii Commendation for Asia Pacific Architecture
- 2005 Urban Land Institute, Award for Excellence: Asia Pacific USA Best Public Project
- 2006 Chicago Athenaeum International Architecture Awards, USA

=== Australian National Architecture Awards ===
- 2003 Walter Burley Griffin Award for Urban Design
- 2003 Interior Architecture Award
- 2007 RAIA National Award for International Architecture

=== RAIA Victorian Awards ===
- 2003 Victorian Architecture Medal
- 2003 Marion Mahony Griffin Award for Interior Architecture
- 2003 Melbourne Prize
- 2003 Joseph Reed Award for Urban Design

=== Other Awards ===
- New Award Australia
- 2003 Interior Design Awards Australia
- 2003 Australian Institute of Landscape Architecture — Award for Design Excellence
- 2003 Dulux Interior Colour Award (2003)
- 2003 Public Domain Award for Sustainability
- 2005 Governor of Victoria Export Awards Commendee
- 2005 Property Council of Australia, Victorian Division Australia, State winner and Best Public Building
- 2006 MBA National Building & Construction Award, Export award under $25m
- 2006 Australian Stone Architectural Awards, Best Civic Project

== Notable projects ==
=== Federation Square ===
Completed in 2002, Federation Square is situated on a 3.6-hectare (8.9-acre) corner site bound by Flinders and Swanston Streets in Melbourne, Australia. With a building footprint of 45,000 square metres the precinct incorporates commercial, civic and cultural programs. Along with a wide variety of restaurants, bars and cafes and retail spaces larger institutions represented include the Ian Potter Centre (NGV), the Australian Centre for the Moving Image (ACMI), Melbourne headquarters for SBS (Australian TV channel) and the Melbourne Visitor Centre.

In 1997 an international design competition was launched by the Victorian Government with a focus of creating new civic space for Melbourne, connecting Flinders Street to the Yarra River and enhancing the cultural attributes of the city. Five designs were shortlisted from the 177 entries. The winning design of Bates Smart Architects and Lab Studio Architects was announced in July 1997. When the competition was won, Federation Square was their first building project.

The main plaza can accommodate up to 25000 people. The outdoor amphitheatre plays host to a variety of festivals and concerts as well as broadcasting cultural events such as the annual Tropfest and sporting events such as the AFL (Australian Football League) Grand Final.

Federation Square was met with widespread disapproval, the architects receiving hate mail from people who loathed the design.

=== Mixed-use and offices ===
SOHO Shangdu Beijing, China (2004–2007) Site area: 2.2 ha Gross floor area: 170,000m^{2} Type: commercial, residential + retail

Riyadh Business Center Riyadh, Saudi Arabia (2005) Site area: 3.9 ha Gross floor area: 87,000m^{2} Type: offices, hotel, retail

Tatweer Towers Dubai (2006) Site area: 7.6 ha Gross floor area: 1,500,000m^{2} Type: commercial offices, residential, hotel + retail

Zovie Towers Tianjin, China (2007-) Site area: 2.7 ha Gross floor area: 223,710m^{2} Type: commercial office, residential, retail, hotel + business club

Guardian Towers Abu Dhabi (2007–2009) Site area: 0.7 ha Gross floor area: 50,000m^{2}

== Gallery ==
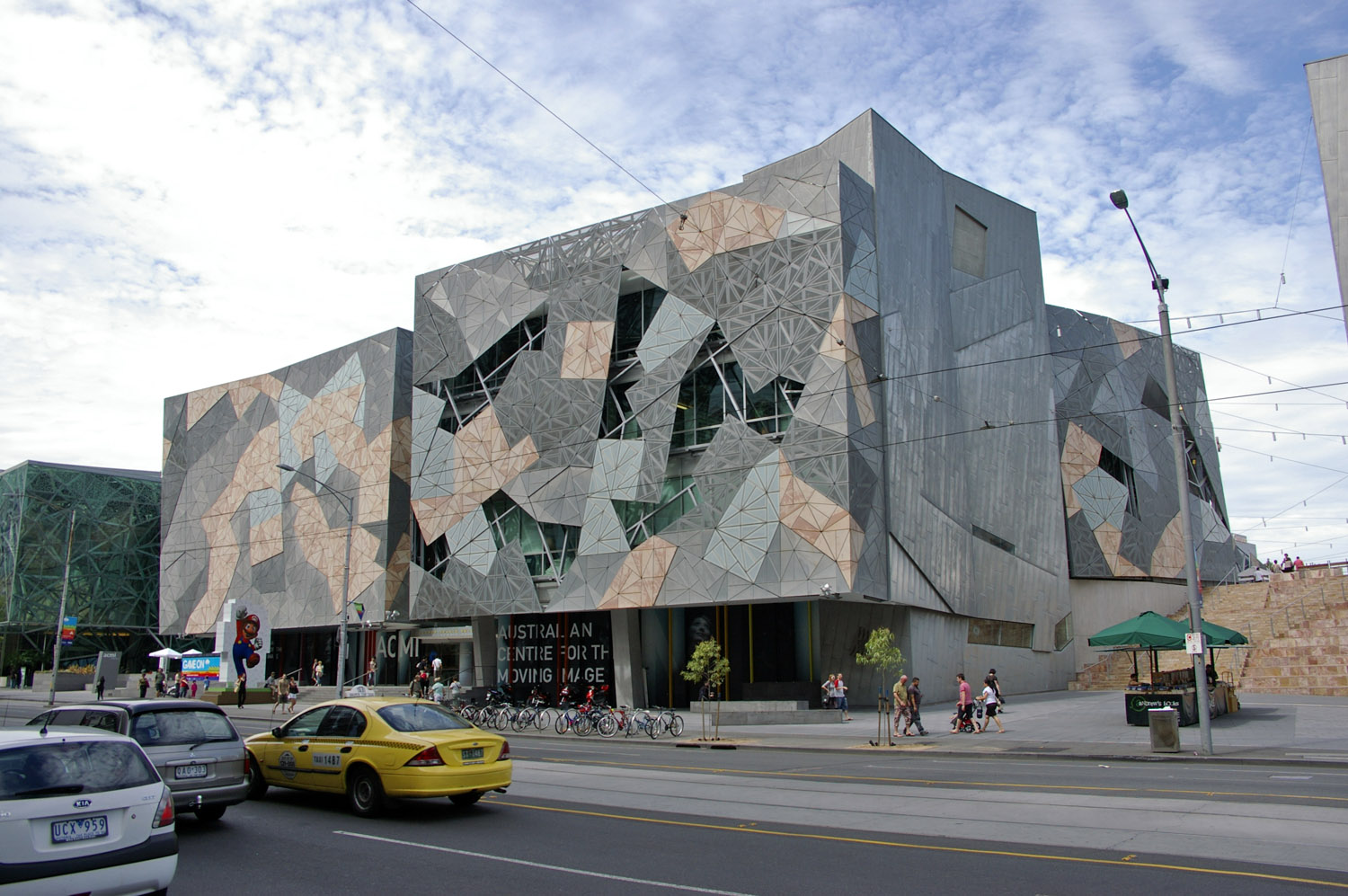
Federation Square, Melbourne

Guardian Towers, Abu Dhabi
