= Settler =

Person who has migrated to an area and established permanent residence there

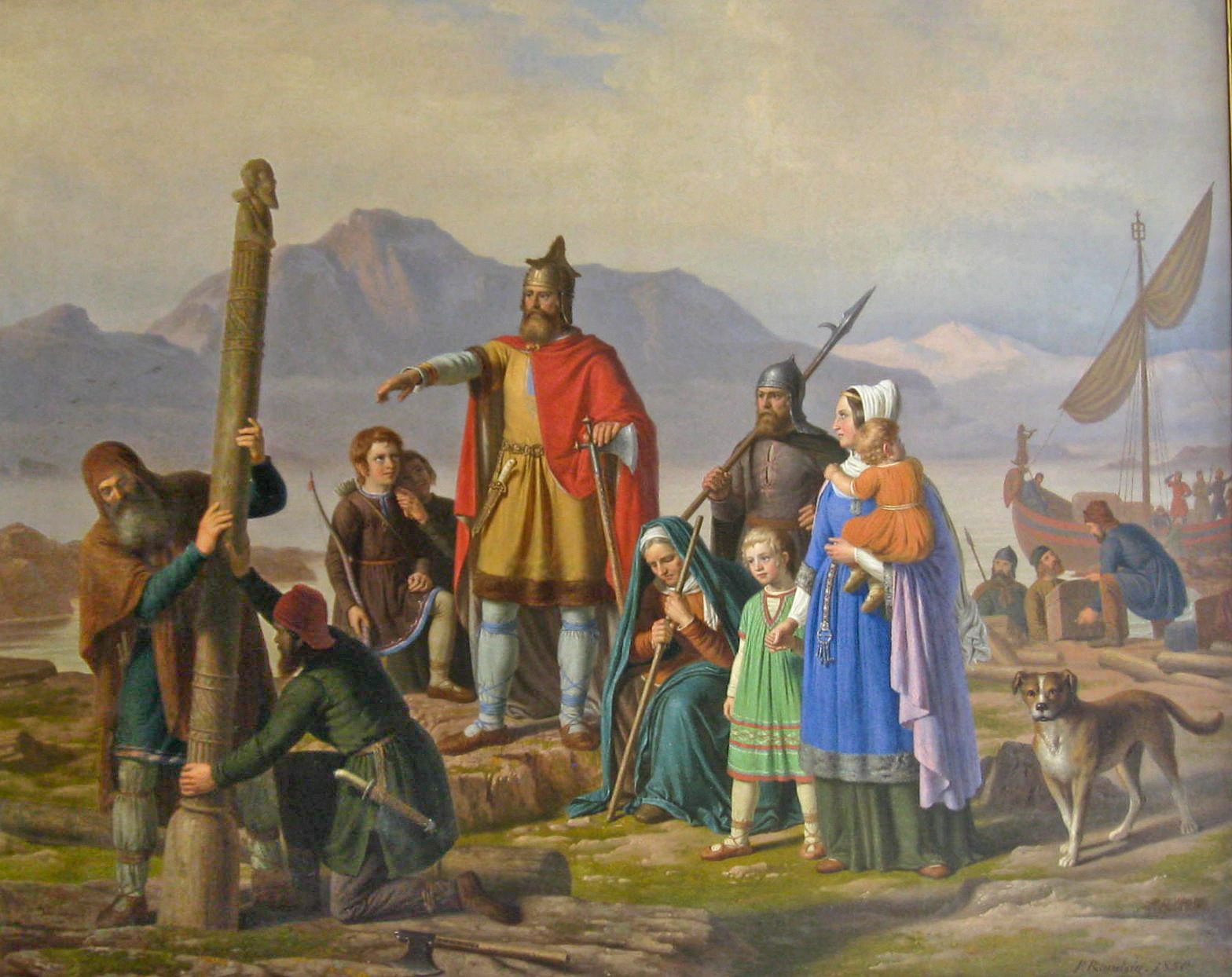
A depiction of the first medieval settlers arriving in Iceland, 1850

A settler or colonist is a person who establishes or joins a permanent presence that is separate to existing communities. The entity that settlers establish is a settlement. A settler is called a pioneer if they are among the first settling at a place that is new to the settler community. While settlers can act independently, they may receive support from the government of their nation or its colonial empire, or from a non-governmental organization, as part of a larger campaign.

The process of settling land can be, and has often been, controversial; while human migration is itself a normal phenomenon, it has not been uncommon throughout human history for settlers to have arrived in already-inhabited lands without the intention of living alongside the native population. In these cases, the conflict that arises between the settlers and the natives, or Indigenous peoples, may result in warfare and possibly the dispossession of the latter within the contested territory desired, usually violently.

The lifestyle of a native population is often disturbed or destroyed if they come into contact with a settler population, particularly when the settler population seeks to mostly replace them. Settlers may also engender a change in culture, or alteration of the existing culture, among the natives. New populations have also been created by the mixing of settlers and natives, including Cape Coloureds in South Africa and Anglo-Indians.

== Historical usage ==
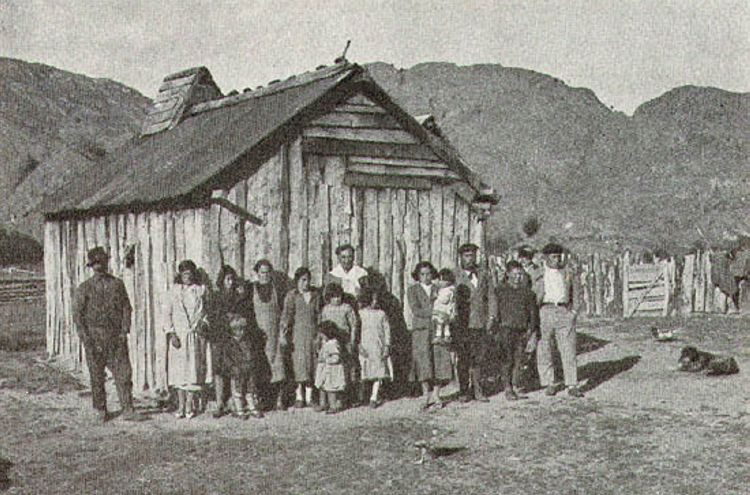
Chilean settlers in Baker River, Patagonia, 1935.

Many times throughout history, settlers occupied land that was previously inhabited by long-established peoples, who are designated as "native" or "Indigenous". The process by which Indigenous territories are settled by foreign peoples is usually called settler colonialism. Such a process relies upon dispossession, often violent.

In the figurative usage, a pioneer (a "person who goes first or does something first") also applies to the American English use of "pioneer" to refer to a settler – a person who has migrated to a less-densely occupied area and established permanent residence there, often to colonize the area, as recorded in the English language from at least 1605. In United States history, "settlers" can refer to the Europeans who were part of the process of settling lands which were new to them.

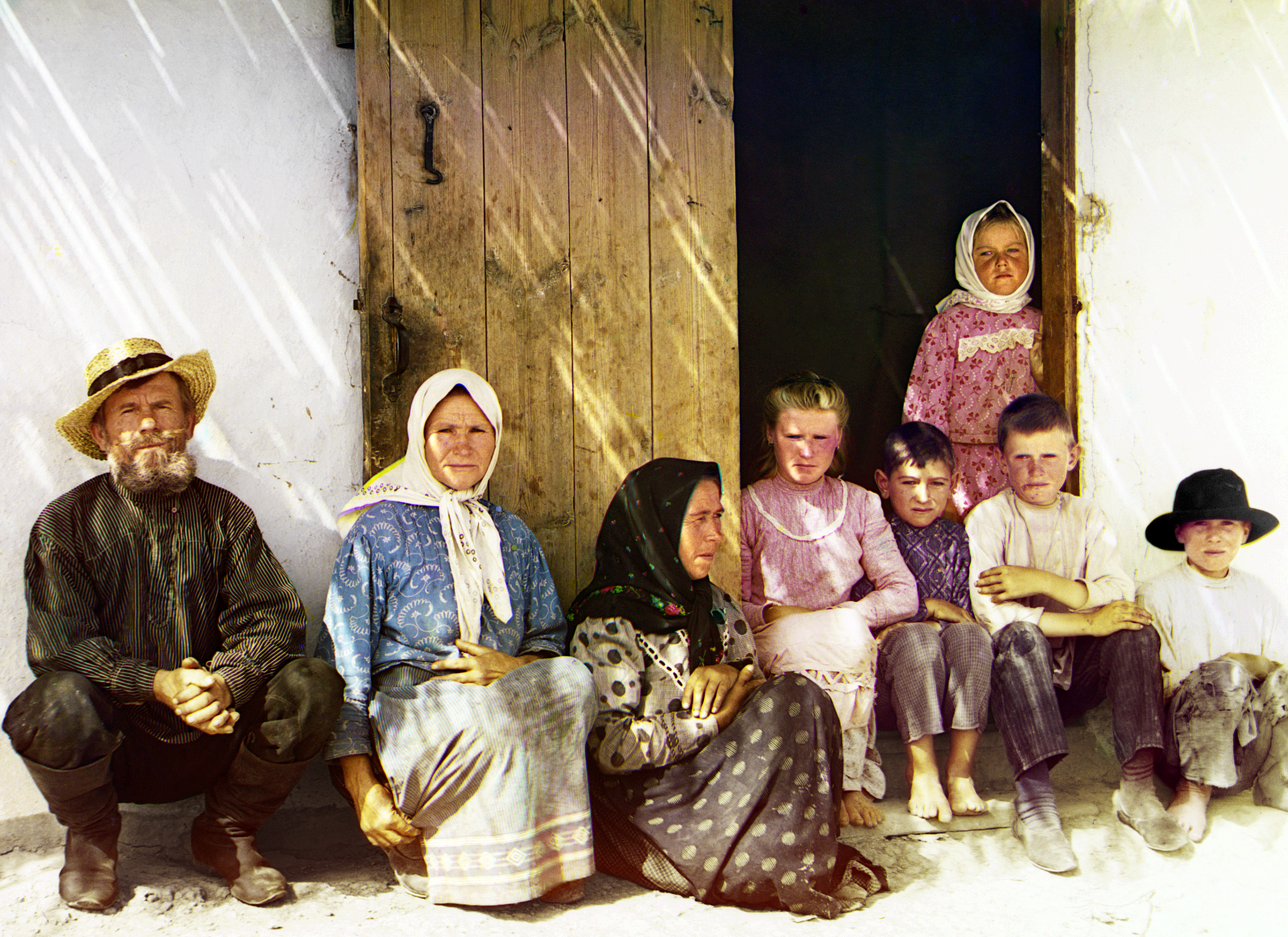
A family of Russian settlers in the Caucasus, c. 1910

The Russian Empire regularly invited Russian subjects and foreign nationals to settle in sparsely populated lands, mostly in North Asia, but also in Central Asia and the Russian Far East. Such exercises resulted in the inception of Slavo-Serbia, the Volga Germans, Volhynia, Russians in Kazakhstan and Green Ukraine, among other phenomena.

Although settlers in the early modern era frequently made use of sea-routes, significant waves of settlement could also use long overland routes, as in the 19th-century cases of the Great Trek by the Boer-Afrikaners in South Africa, or of the Oregon Trail in the United States.

=== Anthropological usage ===
Anthropologists record the tribal displacement of native settlers who drive another tribe from the lands it held. Examples include:

- the settlement of lands in the area now called Carmel-by-the-Sea, California, where the Ohlone people settled in areas that were previously inhabited by the Esselen people
- the Māori settlement of the Chatham Islands from 1835

=== Usage in Canada ===
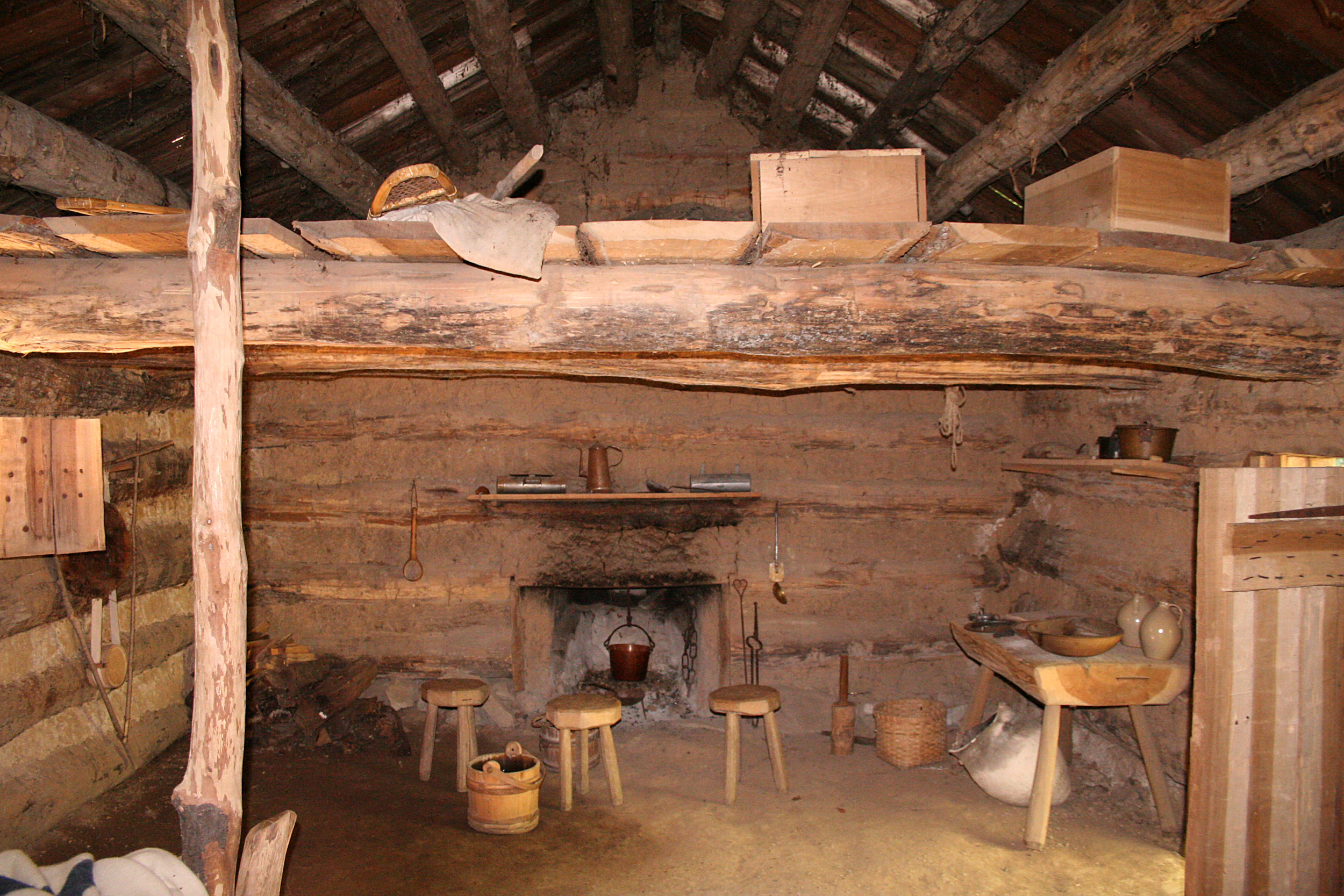
Early European settlers in North America often built crude houses in the form of log cabins.

In Canada, the term "settler" is used by some to characterise non-Indigenous peoples living in Canada who form the sociopolitical majority, thereby suggesting that settler colonialism is an ongoing phenomenon. Black Canadian descendants of slavery are not explicitly considered settlers by scholarship. Usage of the term can be controversial.

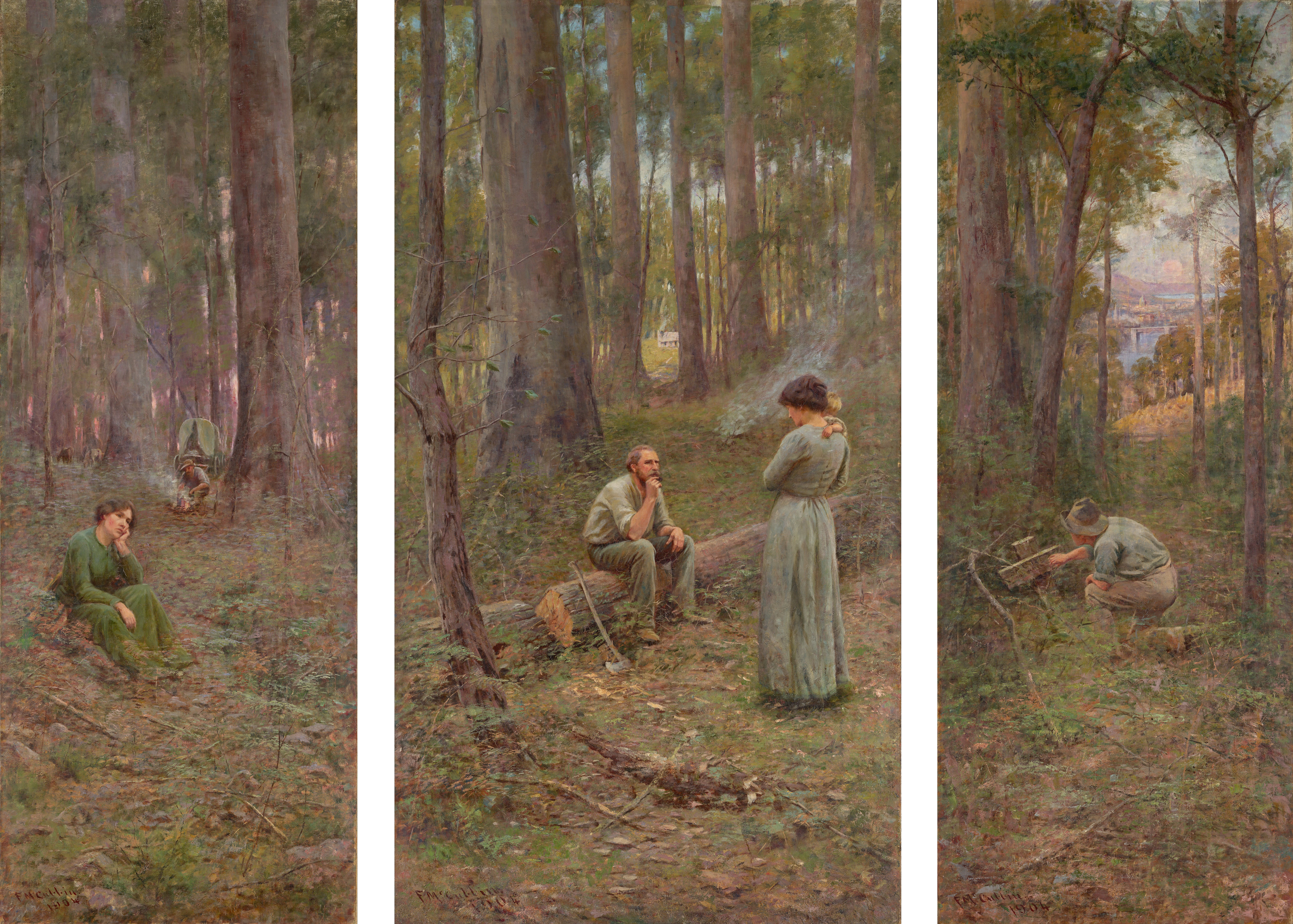
The Pioneer by Australian artist Frederick McCubbin. The painting inspired a book and a film

=== Usage in the Middle East and North Africa ===
In the Middle East and North Africa, there are more recent examples of settler communities being established:

- Iraq – the Ba'athist Arabization campaigns in northern Iraq, which began in 1968, resulted in the ethnic cleansing of non-Arabs, especially Kurds, whom Arab settlers then replaced in a process that continued until the 2003 invasion of Iraq.
- Israel – large-scale immigration of Jews to modern Palestine began by 1882—namely to Jerusalem, Hebron, Tiberias, Safed, Jaffa, Haifa, Peki'in, Acre, Nablus, Shfaram, Petah Tikva and various other locations. By 1948, about 630,000 Jewish residents lived there, of which about 460,000 were immigrants. After the 1967 Arab–Israeli War and the Jewish exodus from the Muslim world, Jews from around the world began moving into the formerly restricted and Jordan-occupied West Bank and the formerly Egyptian-occupied Gaza Strip. Since the Israeli Declaration of Independence in 1948, more than 3 million Jews have made aliyah (lit. 'ascent'), the immigration of Jews from the diaspora to the geographical Land of Israel. Israeli settlement has been discussed in the Israeli–Palestinian peace process.
- Cyprus – after the Turkish invasion of Cyprus in 1974, citizens of the Republic of Turkey began moving into the internationally unrecognized Turkish Republic of Northern Cyprus. As of 2016 it was estimated that these Turkish settlers constituted around half of the population of Northern Cyprus.
- Morocco – from the beginning of the Western Sahara conflict in the 1970s, citizens of the Kingdom of Morocco began moving into the Moroccan-occupied Western Sahara.

== Settler sociology ==
The right of freedom of movement may imply that anyone may settle anywhere, laws and limitations notwithstanding, and non-African modern humans, who originated in Africa, all descend from settlers who travelled elsewhere. However, various types of settlers may stand out in initial settlement-patterns:

=== Misfits ===
Societies with rigid structural institutions such as primogeniture may make it desirable for younger sons to settle elsewhere. (Note: Winston Churchill explained British primogeniture habits: 'We give everything to the eldest and the others strive to duplicate it and found empires.') The American slogan "Go West, young man" directly addresses the young in promoting settlement of the American West. And folk-tales exemplify the role of younger brothers: the archetypal youngest son must go out into the world to seek his fortune; often he rescues and marries a (foreign) princess and inherits half of her father's kingdom. (Note: Compare Aarne–Thompson type 530.)

Social systems featuring habits of polygyny or of concubinage, which occurred commonly in pre-modern society, can generate quantities of unmarriageable young men. They can produce new ethnic groups abroad – including secondary settler-populations (descendants of settlers who themselves can become settlers) such as the Métis in Canada and the Griqua people in southern Africa.

=== Trouble-makers ===
Britain exported indentured convicts to its North American settlements, and later (1788 to 1868) to the Australian colonies which convicts and ex-convicts helped to develop and to populate. Russia and the Soviet Union developed and peopled much of Siberia with convicts and exiles. France sent convicts to Devil's Island in French Guiana and exiled socialist revolutionary communards and other prisoners to New Caledonia. Disgraced remittance-men might skulk on the outskirts of settler society: paid by their relatives to stay a decent distance away from the metropole.

=== Opportunists ===
Frontiersmen and colonial entrepreneurs represent the classical romantic type of "sturdy-pioneer" settlers. Portuguese and Spanish conquistadors, British traders in India and pioneer planters in the early colonies of the Southern United States belong traditionally in this group. Some early colonial land-grants made ownership conditional on attracting more people via headrights – using territory to lure settlers who would recruit further settlers. Gold rushes drew many people, some of whom subsequently became settlers in remote lands (Brazil, California, and Australia, for example). Economic incentives have long influenced the movements of migrants – most recently in the form of "golden passports".

=== Refugees ===
Political, religious, or economic oppression or disadvantage can induce whole sub-groups to emigrate as refugees. Anti-monarchist Norsemen traditionally left Scandinavia to settle in Iceland; nomad tribes seek more favorable territories for temporary or permanent settlement; Puritans fled from Europe to North America; Jews move to and fro across the globe; disadvantaged people from (for example) the Third World seek opportunities elsewhere.

=== Economic migrants ===
The impetus for refugees to settle elsewhere may overlap with the factors encouraging economic migrants to become settlers in places seemingly offering more attractive conditions. Temporary migrants can become permanent settlers.

=== Chain migrants ===
Families, finances and fellow-villagers (for example) can follow earlier settlers to new lands. The practice of chain migration requires reverse communication or return migration, but has a long tradition with several variants. Chain migration, with voyaging to and fro, can explain the island-hopping strategies that led to the peopling of the Pacific Ocean by Austronesian peoples from about 3000 BCE onwards. Seventeenth-century France exported les Filles du Roy to French settlements in Canada with the aim of stabilising and boosting the population of the French settler society there. In the 1950s, young women from the Netherlands arrived in New Zealand by the plane-load with a view to marrying their erstwile compatriots.

== Causes of emigration ==
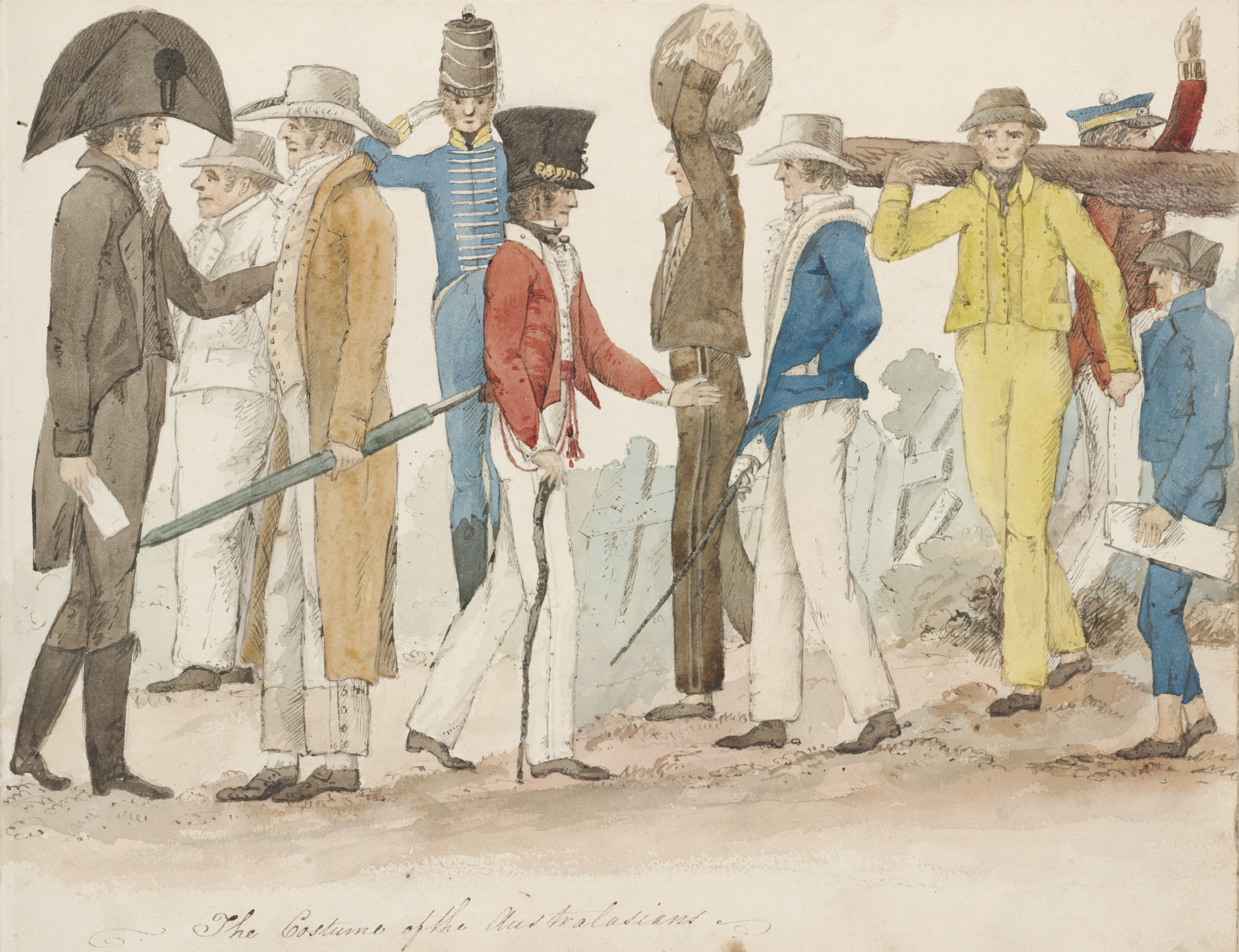
The Costume of the Australasians by Edward Charles Close shows the co-existence of convicts, soldiers and free settlers in New South Wales c. 1817.

The reasons for the emigration of settlers vary, but often they include the following factors and incentives: the desire to start a new and better life in a foreign land, personal financial hardship, social, cultural, ethnic, or religious persecution (e.g., the Pilgrims and Mormons), penal deportation (e.g. of convicted criminals from England to Australia), political oppression, and governmental incentive-policies aimed at encouraging foreign settlement.

Accounts of the "barbarian" Völkerwanderung of Late antiquity in Eurasia give the impression that whole tribes sometimes migrated en masse into new areas of settlement: warriors bringing their households ("women and children") with them. Postulated causes of these mass-migrations include:

- the defeat of the migrants by other migrants (such as the Huns) encroaching into their former territories
- climate change disrupting societies on and around the Eurasian steppe
- natural disasters such as the outbreak of disease or plague

== See also ==
- Anglo-Saxon settlement of Britain
- Chinese settlements in Tibet
- Colonialism
- Forced displacement
- Generalplan Ost
- High Arctic relocation
- Imperialism
- Israeli settlement
- Moroccan settlers
- Naturalized TRNC citizens
- Oregon Trail
- Patriot (American Revolution)
- Phoenix Islands Settlement Scheme
- Pioneer (military)
- Population transfer
- Sooners
- Sri Lankan state sponsored colonisation schemes
- Transmigration program
- Turkic settlement of the Tarim Basin
- Turkish settlers in Northern Cyprus
- Virgin Lands Campaign
