= The Pioneers (1916 film) =

- Directed by: Franklyn Barrett
- Written by: Franklyn Barrett
- Based on: novel by Katharine Susannah Prichard
- Produced by: Franklyn Barrett; Leopold A. Nettheim
- Starring: Winter Hall
- Cinematography: Franklyn Barrett
- Release date: 18 October 1916
- Country: Australia
- Languages: Silent film; English intertitles

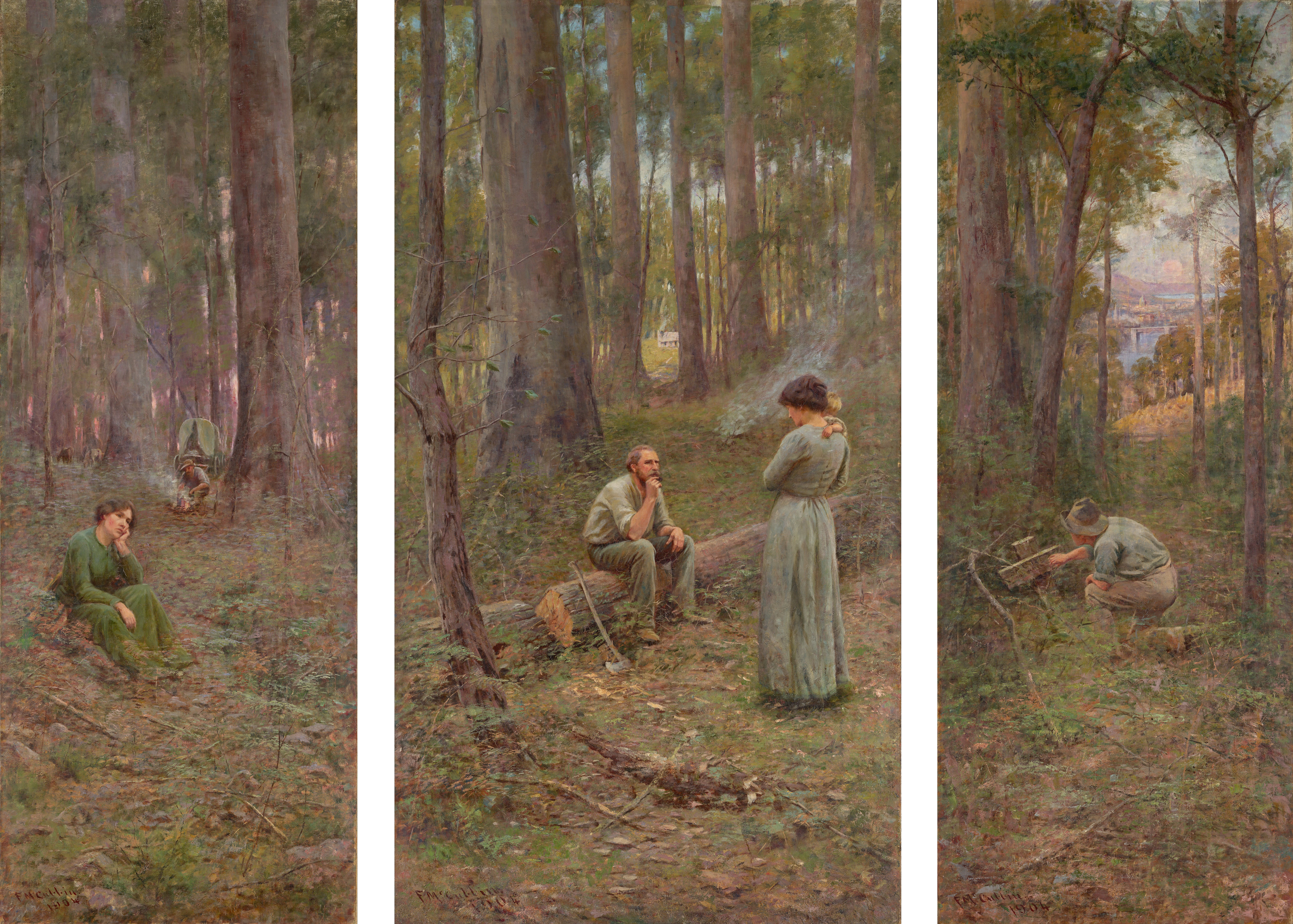
Frederick McCubbin's 1904 triptych The Pioneer inspired the film.

The Pioneers is a 1916 Australian silent film directed by Franklyn Barrett. It is considered a lost film.

The film was inspired by The Pioneer, a 1904 painting by Frederick McCubbin of the Heidelberg School movement, also known as Australian impressionism. The film was later remade by Raymond Longford as The Pioneers (1926).

== Plot ==
A convict, Dan Farrel, escapes from Van Diemen's Land and throws himself on the mercy of a farming couple, Mary and Donald Cameron. The years pass and Dan becomes a school teacher. He marries and they have a daughter, Dierdre, but his wife dies.

Dierdre grows up and agrees to marry a local pub keeper, McNab, to stop him from revealing that Dan is a convict. McNab still goes to the police and Dan is arrested. Dierdre accidentally kills McNab.

== Cast ==
- Winter Hall as Dan Farrel
- Alma Rock Phillips as Deidre
- Lily Rochefort as Mary Cameron
- Charles Knight as Donald Cameron
- Fred St. Clair as Davey Cameron
- Irve Hayman as Thad McNab
- Martyn Keith as Steve
- Fred Neilson as Conal "Fighting Conal"
- Nell Rose as Jessie
- George Willougbhy
- Charles Villiers

== Production ==
Barrett bought the rights to the novel while in England.

The film was shot in early 1915 near Gosford and in a studio owned by Franklyn Barrett.

Rock Phillips of J. C. Williamson Ltd wrote that the film ushered a new level of professionalism in Australian filmmaking:

The local productions, to date, with the exceptions of, say, half a dozen, have been absolutely ruined by - inferior acting, being badly cast and carelessly dressed. That is only what can be expected when those in charge of the financial part of the business, pay so little for services rendered, there being no inducement for the best class of 'pro' to enter this business. When they offer the capable artist a fair salary commensurate with his or her ability, then, and not till then, will Australian-made pictures hold their own with the best on the other side... The director of tho latest Australian venture in the Movie business has recognised the above, in filming... The Pioneers... Besides getting together a company of well-known players' he is paying them top salaries. Expense is a secondary consideration, the goal aimed at being an evenly and well acted story.

== Reception ==
Reviews were generally positive.

== See also ==
- List of lost films
