= Bush Idyll =

Painting by Frederick McCubbin

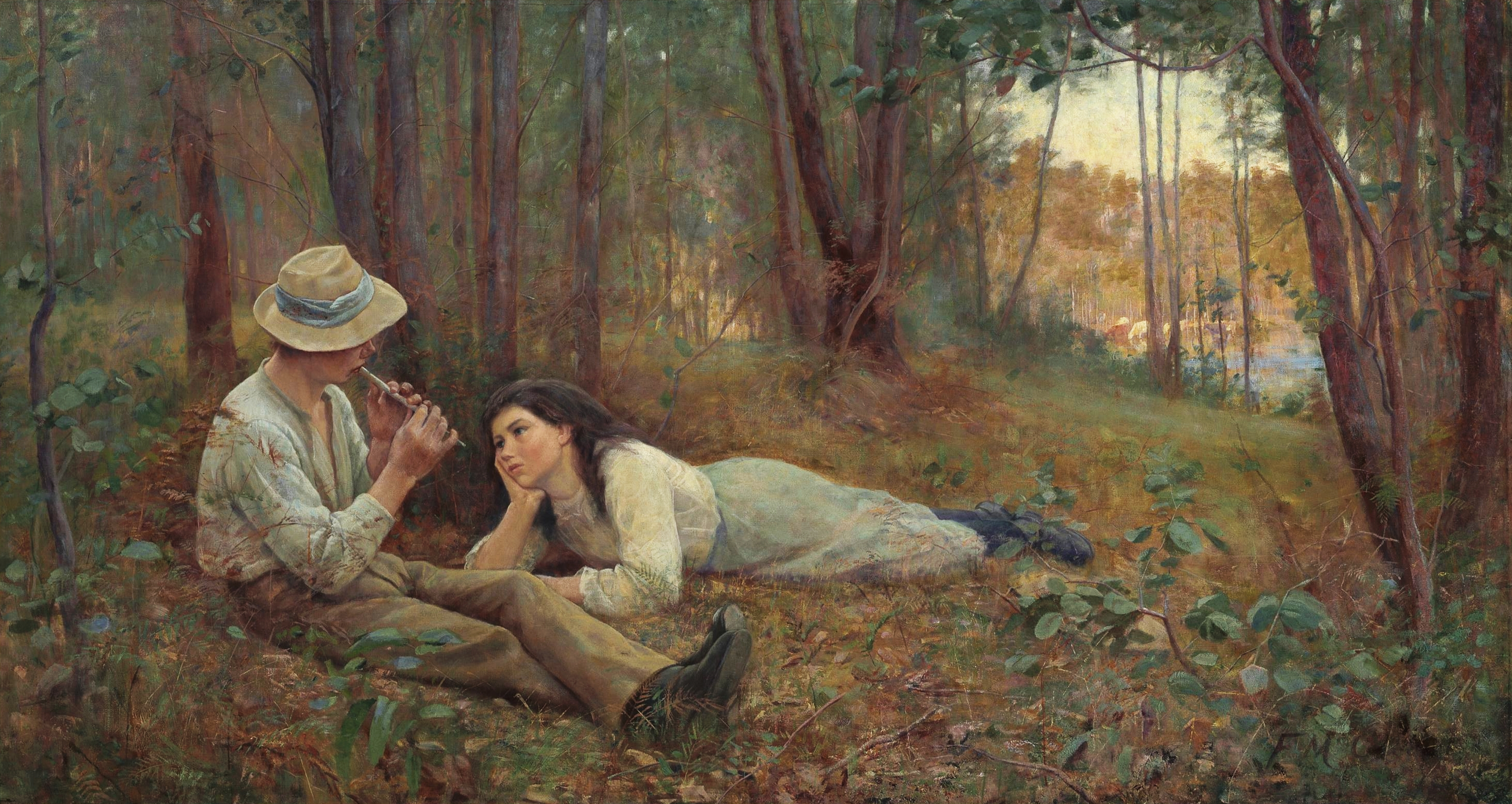
- Artist: Frederick McCubbin
- Year: 1893
- Medium: oil on canvas
- Dimensions: 119.5 cm × 221.5 cm (47.0 in × 87.2 in)
- Location: National Gallery of Australia; Canberra

Bush Idyll is an 1893 painting by Australian artist Frederick McCubbin, and widely regarded as one of the finest masterpieces in Australian art history. The painting depicts a girl and boy - who is playing a tin whistle - lying on the ground near a lake.

The painting is part of a private collection and, between 2017 and 2020, was on loan to the National Gallery of Australia.

== Composition ==
McCubbin painted the work at Blackburn, now a suburb of Melbourne. The painting shows Blackburn Lake in the distance. The model for the girl was Mary Jane Lobb, born in Castlemaine in 1881 and died in 1959. The model for the boy is unknown.

The work is said to show the influence of French artist Jean-Baptiste-Camille Corot.

== Provenance ==
McCubbin gifted the painting to a friend, painter and art patron Louis Abrahams. In 1919, years after Abrahams' death, much of his art collection, including Bush Idyll, was put up for auction in Melbourne. Bush Idyll was purchased by showbusiness promoter Hugh D. McIntosh, who took the painting to England. The location of the work was then unknown for 50 years until in 1979 an English pig farmer asked a gallery owner in Cambridge to appraise a work he was gifted many years before by a wealthy friend.

In 1984, the work was acquired for £150,000 by bookmaker David Waterhouse who brought it back to Australia. Waterhouse sold the work by auction in 1998 for the then-record price of AUD2.31 million. In 2013, the work failed to sell at auction though was sold after auction to a private collector. Between 2017 and 2020 the work was on long-term loan to the National Gallery of Australia, Canberra. In late 2021 and early 2022 the painting was a part of the "Frederick McCubbin - Whisperings in wattle boughs" exhibition at the Geelong Gallery, Geelong.
