= The North Wind =

Painting by Frederick McCubbin

The North wind
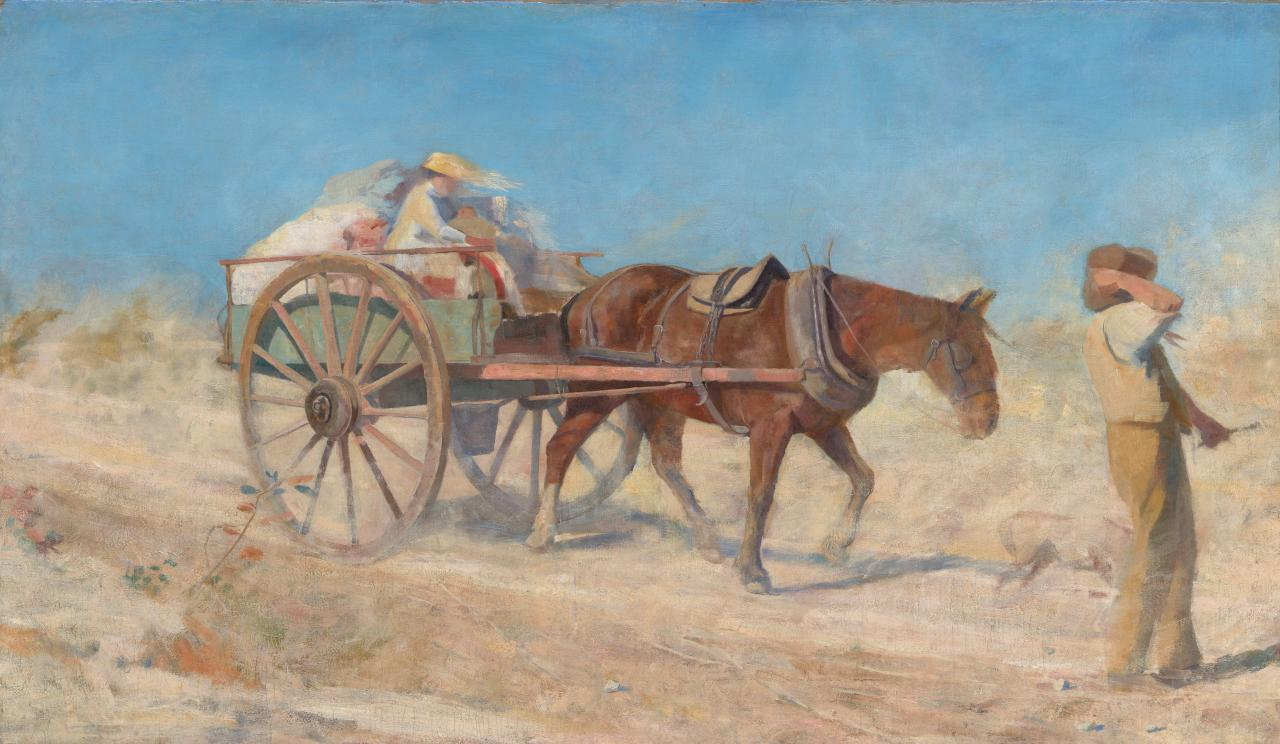
- Artist: Frederick McCubbin
- Year: 1888
- Type: oil on canvas on plywood
- Dimensions: 91.9 cm × 152.3 cm (36.2 in × 60.0 in)
- Location: National Gallery of Victoria; Melbourne

The North Wind is a painting by Australian painter Frederick McCubbin, thought to have been painted in around 1888. The painting depicts a young family—the woman and child in a dray, the man and a dog on foot—making "its way down a bush track, buffeted by the treacherous ‘north wind’".

The painting was acquired by the National Gallery of Victoria (NGV) in 1941 through the Felton Bequest. The NGV undertook a major restoration of the painting in 2014 funded with assistance from the Bank of America Merrill Lynch Art Conservation Project.
