= On the Wallaby Track =

Painting by Frederick McCubbin

On the wallaby track
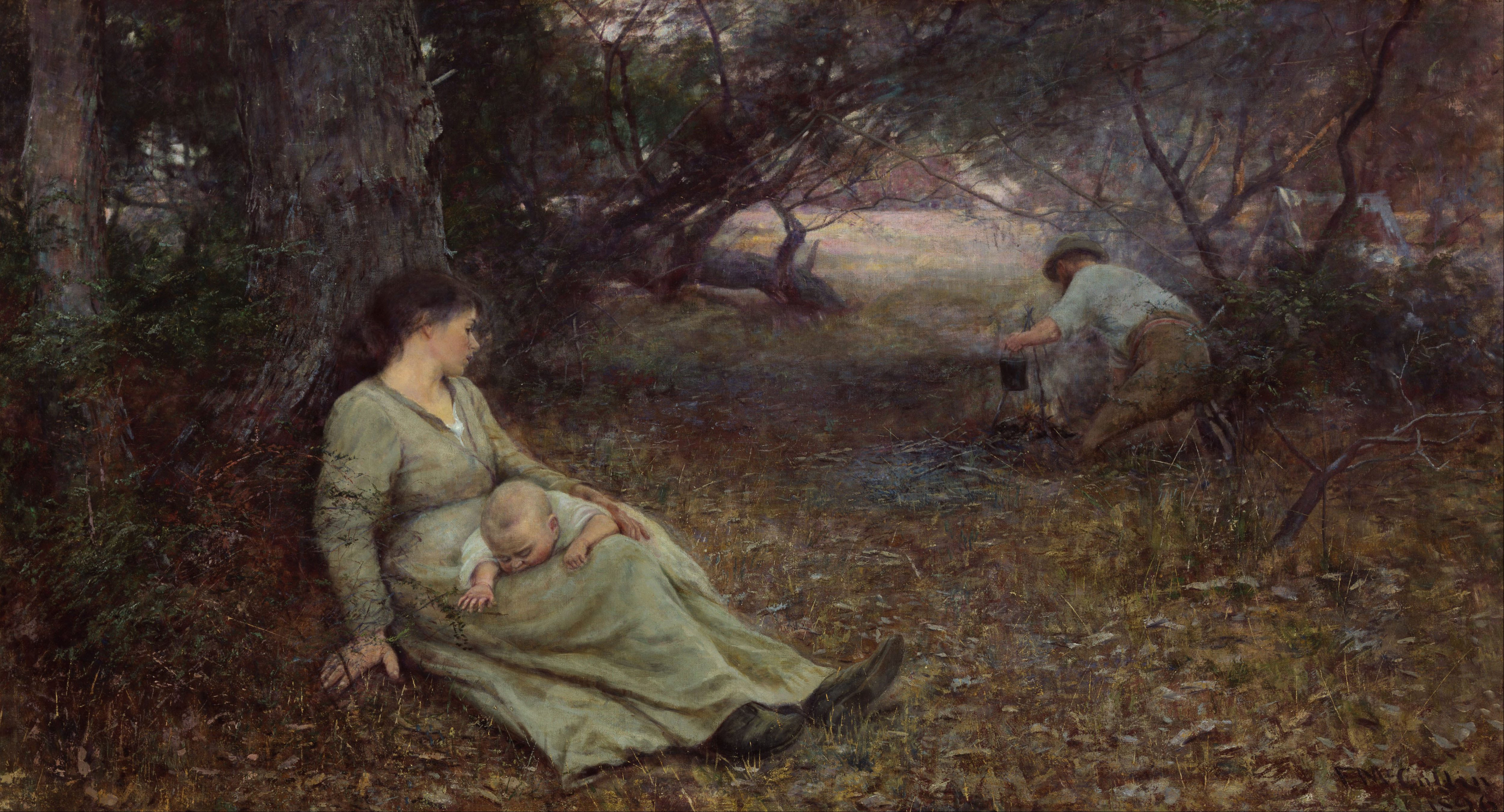
- Artist: Frederick McCubbin
- Year: 1896
- Medium: oil on canvas
- Dimensions: 122.0 cm × 223.5 cm (48.0 in × 88.0 in)
- Location: Art Gallery of New South Wales; Sydney

On the wallaby track is an 1896 painting by the Australian artist Frederick McCubbin. The painting depicts an itinerant family; a woman with her child on her lap and a man boiling a billy for tea. The painting's name comes from the colloquial Australian term "On the wallaby track" used to describe itinerant rural workers or "swagmen" moving from place to place for work. The work has been described as "among the best known and most popularly admired of Australian paintings".

McCubbin painted the work near his residence in Brighton, Victoria, a suburb of Melbourne. He used his family as models—his wife Annie for the woman and his young son John for the baby. Michael Moriaty, Annie's younger brother, was the model for the man.

An infra-red photograph of the painting revealed that the head of the woman was originally painted facing the viewer and only later turned to face away.

The painting is now part of the collection of the Art Gallery of New South Wales, having been bought in 1897 for £126.

The work is popularly known in Australia due to its use in an advertisement for Kit Kat chocolate bars in the 1980s. On 17 June 1981, the painting was used on an Australian $2 postage stamp.

Scottish-Australian poet and bush balladeer Will H. Ogilvie (1869–1963) wrote the poem 'The wallaby track' which was printed in The Bulletin on 6 June 1896, the same year as McCubbin's painting. The poem was later included in Ogilvie's inaugural anthology Fair girls and gray horses.
