= The Pioneer (painting) =

Painting by Frederick McCubbin

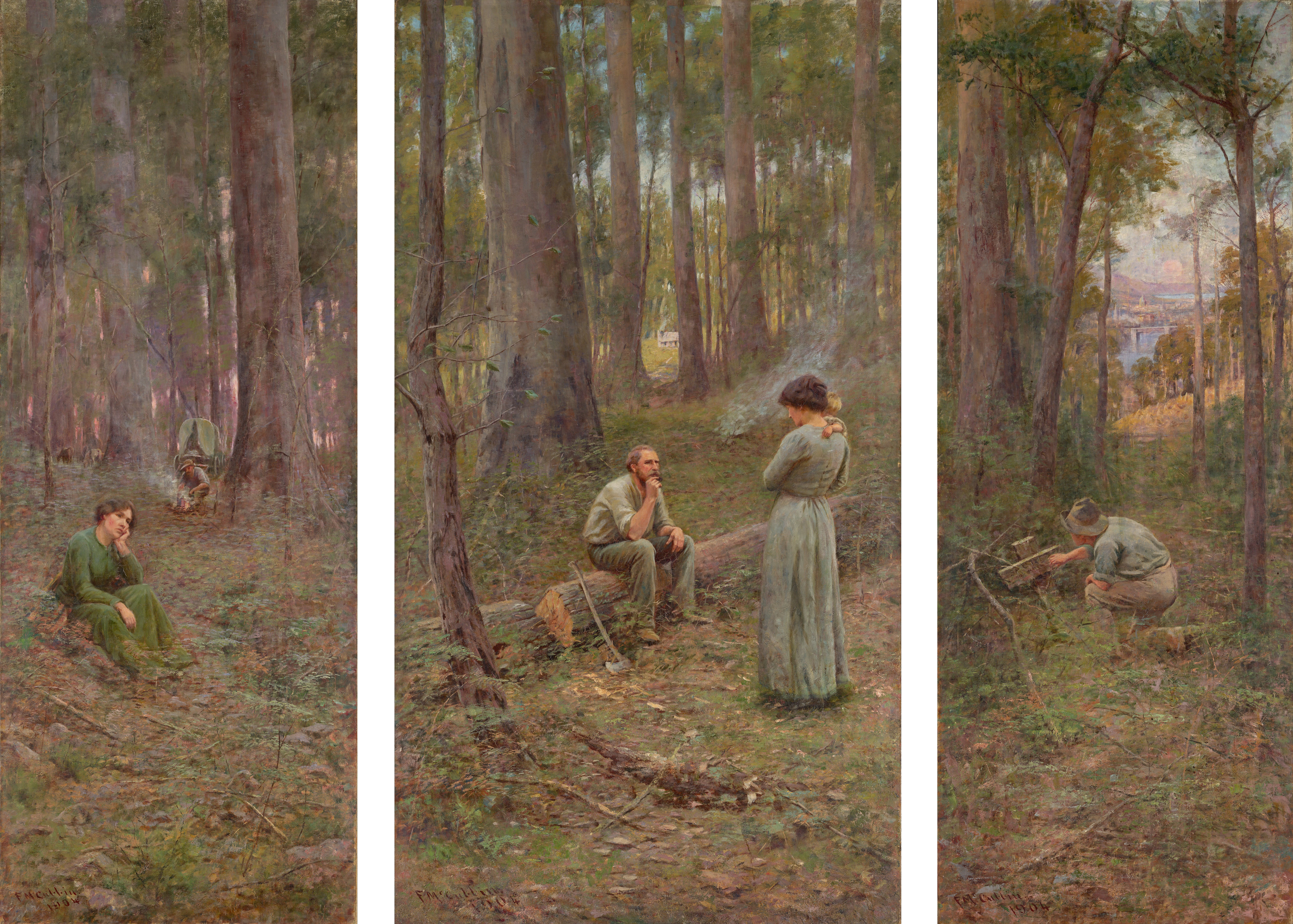
- Artist: Frederick McCubbin
- Year: 1904
- Medium: oil on canvas
- Dimensions: 225.0 cm × 295.7 cm (88.6 in × 116.4 in)
- Location: National Gallery of Victoria; Melbourne

The Pioneer is a 1904 painting by Australian artist Frederick McCubbin. The painting is a triptych; the three panels tell a story of a free selector and his family making a life in the Australian bush. It is widely considered one of the masterpieces of Australian art.

The painting is part of the National Gallery of Victoria's Australian art collection and exhibited in the Ian Potter Centre in Federation Square in Melbourne.

== Composition ==
The three panels of the triptych tell a story of a free selector, a farmer who has chosen some land to clear and farm, and his family. The story is ambiguous, like many of McCubbin's other works and McCubbin chose not to respond when controversy broke out over the "correct" meaning.

The left panel shows the selector and his wife settling on their selection; in the foreground, the woman is deep in thought. In the centre panel, the baby in the woman's arms indicates that some time has elapsed. A cottage, the family home, can be seen in a clearing through the trees. The right panel shows a man crouching over a grave. A city is visible in the background, again indicating that time has passed. It is unclear whose grave it is, and if the man is the pioneer, the baby from the centre panel, or a stranger stumbling across the grave.

McCubbin painted the work en plein air near Fontainebleau — his home in Mount Macedon, northwest of Melbourne — using specially dug trenches to lower the canvas. The view is across a neighbouring property owned by William Peter McGregor, the second chairman of BHP. The cottage in the middle panel was the home of the manager of McGregor's bull stud. McCubbin's wife Annie and a local sawyer Patrick "Paddy" Watson were the models for the left panel, with Watson also the model for the youth in the right panel. The model for the centre panel was a young commercial painter, James Edward with Annie again posing as the woman. The baby was Jimmy Watson, Patrick's nephew.

A study of the materials and technique used in the painting revealed that—to add "luminosity and texture"—McCubbin covered the ground in the centre panel with a further layer of lead white; the brush marks in the stiffer lead white can be seen through the later layers in raking light. Raking light also shows that a palette knife has been used in some places to apply paint to the surface. The painting is still displayed in its original frame; the frame may have been resurfaced.

While inspecting the painting by torchlight in November 2020, Michael Varcoe-Cocks, the National Gallery of Victoria’s head of conservation, noticed a shadow of an odd shape on the surface of the centre panel. Comparison between X-Rays of the painting and a small black-and-white photograph included in McCubbin’s scrapbook confirmed that the artist had painted over his previous 1892 work entitled "Found", which depicted a life-size bushman holding a small child.

== History and legacy ==
The painting was first exhibited in a one-man show in 1904 at the Melbourne Athenaeum gallery but did not find a buyer. Walter Withers, a friend of McCubbin's, suggested that McCubbin add a view of Melbourne in the background of the right panel, which he did. The National Gallery of Victoria purchased the painting the following year for 367 pounds and 10 shillings, using funds from the Felton Bequest.

The painting has inspired works in other artistic mediums. Upon seeing The Pioneer at the National Gallery of Victoria for the first time, Katharine Susannah Prichard declared, "Some day I will tell the story of that picture." Several years elapsed until the release of her debut novel, The Pioneers (1915). McCubbin's painting served as the frontispiece of the book. The novel was adapted into a 1916 film of the same name, directed by Franklyn Barrett. McCubbin attended the premier.

The painting has been described as "self-consciously nationalistic; proud of the prosperity of the fine city seen in the background - Its mood of quiet optimism is unqualified."
