= Frederick McCubbin =

Australian artist (1855–1917)

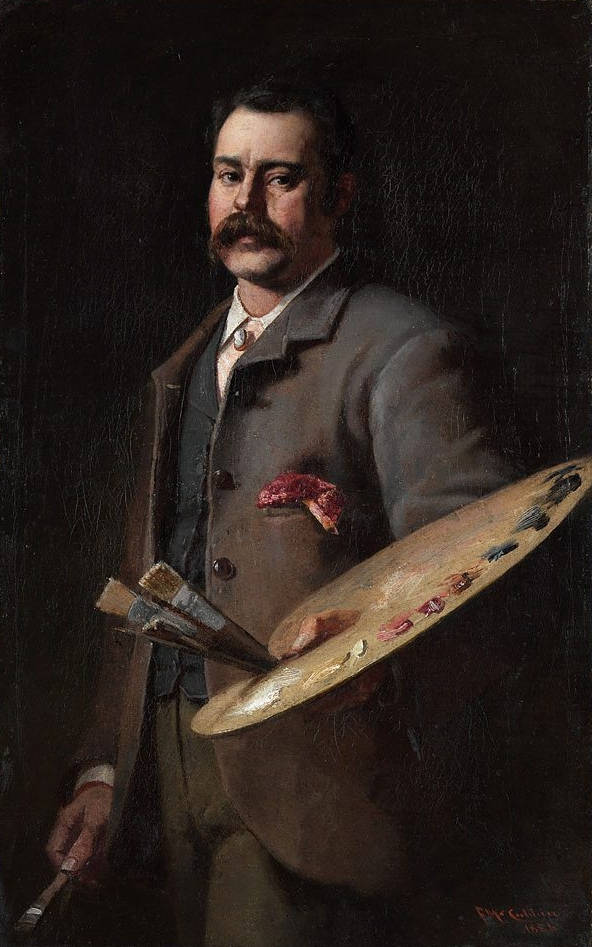
- Self-portrait, 1886, Art Gallery of New South Wales
- Born: 25 February 1855; Melbourne, Victoria, Australia
- Died: 20 December 1917 (aged 62); Melbourne, Victoria, Australia
- Education: National Gallery of Victoria Art School
- Known for: Painting
- Movement: Heidelberg School

Frederick McCubbin (25 February 1855 – 20 December 1917) was an Australian artist, art teacher and prominent member of the Heidelberg School art movement, also known as Australian impressionism.

Born and raised in Melbourne, Victoria, McCubbin studied at the National Gallery of Victoria Art School under a number of artists, notably Eugene von Guerard and later George Folingsby. One of his former classmates, Tom Roberts, returned from art training in Europe in 1885, and that summer they established the Box Hill artists' camp, where they were joined by Arthur Streeton and Charles Conder. These artists formed the nucleus of what became known as the Heidelberg School, a plein air art movement named after Heidelberg, the site of another one of their camps. During this time, he began teaching at the National Gallery school, and later served as president of both the Victorian Artists' Society and the Australian Art Association.

Concerned with capturing the national life of Australia, McCubbin produced a number of large landscapes that reflect the melancholic themes then popular in literary accounts of European settlers' interactions with the bush. Several of these works have become icons of Australian art, including Down on His Luck (1889), On the Wallaby Track (1896) and The Pioneer (1904).

During his first and only trip to Europe in 1907, McCubbin gained first-hand exposure to works by J. M. W. Turner and the French impressionists, accelerating a shift in his art towards freer, more abstracted brushwork and lighter colours. Works from this late period, although not as well known as his earlier national narratives, are considered by many critics to be his strongest artistically. "When he died", wrote Barry Pearce, "McCubbin was one of the very few Australian painters who found an exalted resolution of vision that progressed with age, so that some of his greatest paintings were made in the last ten years of his life."

== Early years and background ==
McCubbin was born in Melbourne, the third of eight children of baker Alexander McCubbin (from Ayrshire, Scotland) and his English wife Anne, née McWilliams. McCubbin was educated at William Willmett's West Melbourne Common School and St Paul's School, Swanston Street. He later worked for a time as solicitor's clerk, a coach painter and in his family's bakery business while studying art at the National Gallery of Victoria's School of Design, where he met Tom Roberts and studied under Eugene von Guerard. He also studied at the Victorian Academy of the Arts and exhibited there in 1876 and again from 1879 to 1882, selling his first painting in 1880. In this period, after the death of his father, he became responsible for running the family business.

== Career ==
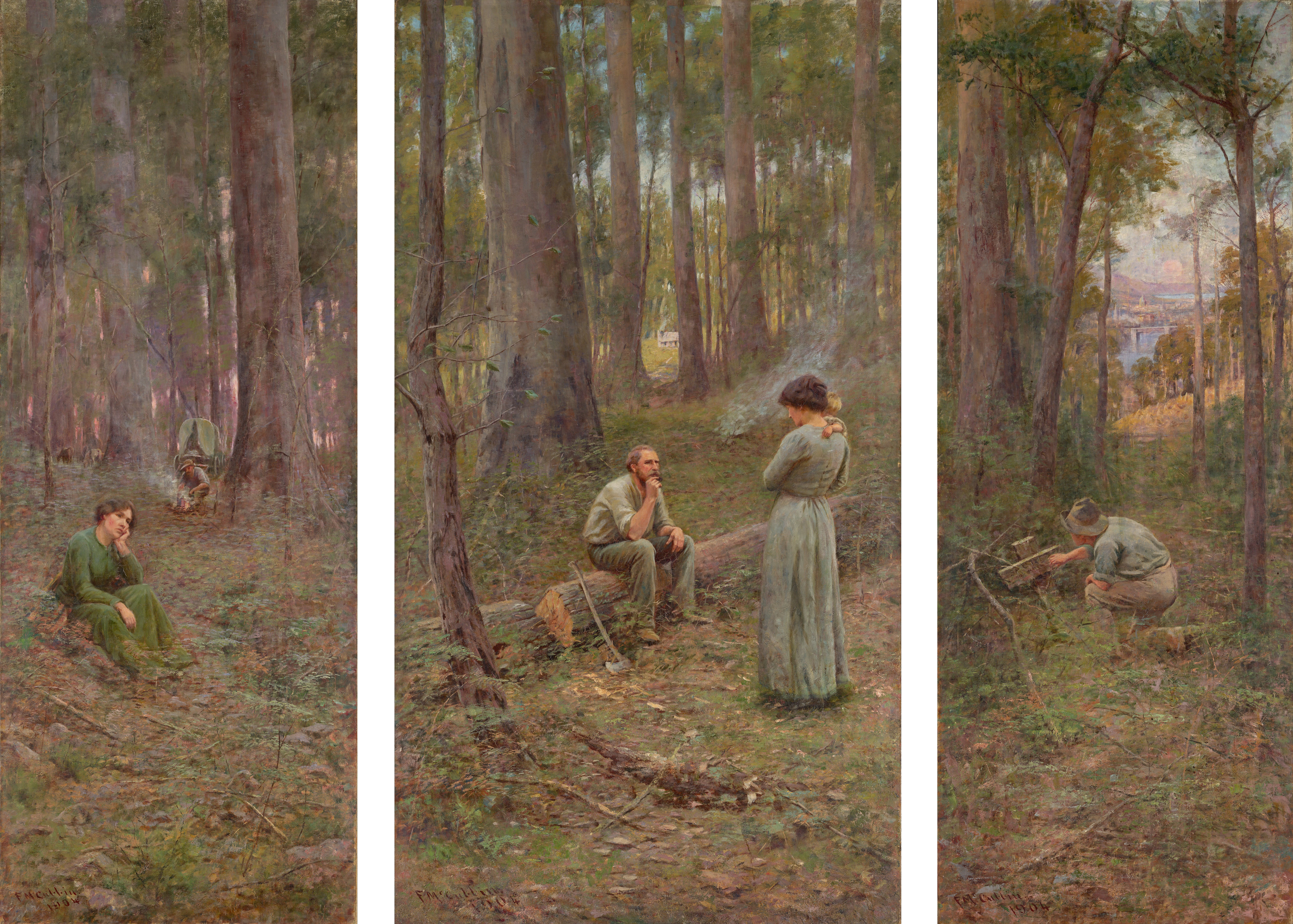
The Pioneer, 1904, National Gallery of Victoria

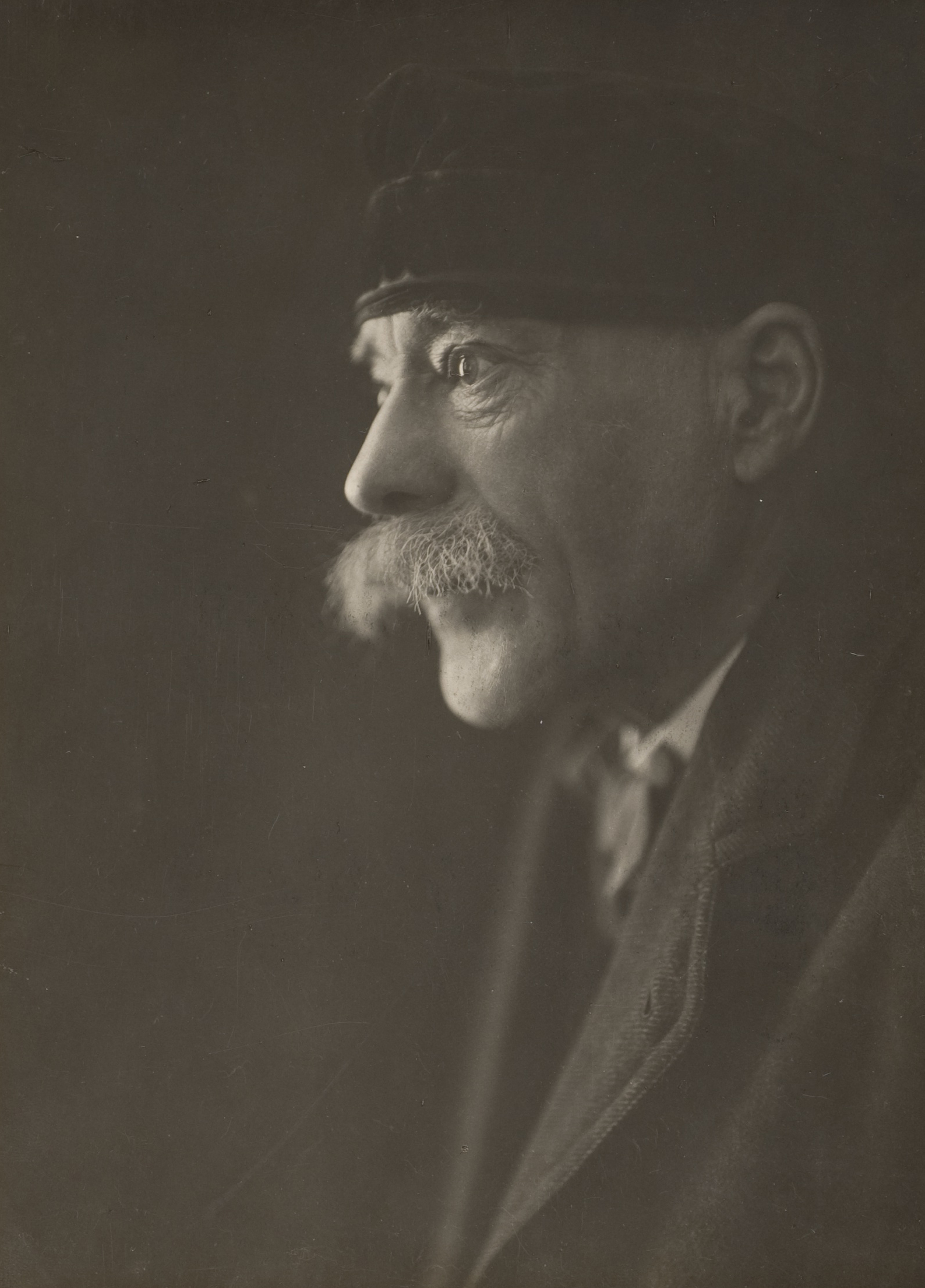
Frederick McCubbin, 1913-17, by May and Mina Moore, State Library of New South Wales

By the early 1880s, McCubbin's work began to attract considerable attention and won a number of prizes from the National Gallery, including a first prize in 1883 in their annual student exhibition. By the mid-1880s he concentrated more on painting the Australian bush, the works for which he became notable.

In 1883, McCubbin received first prize in the first annual Gallery students' exhibition, for best studies in colour and drawing. That year, while still a student, he joined the bohemian Buonarotti Club whose members painted en plein air at their art camps and exhibited the resulting landscapes for critique at Club meetings. Mead argues that such early experience was formative in his Heidelberg School landscape painting. In 1888, he became instructor and master of the School of Design at the National Gallery. In this position he taught a number of students who themselves became prominent Australian artists, including Charles Conder and Arthur Streeton.

McCubbin was exhibiting and perhaps painting in the studio of his friend Tom Roberts in the Grosvenor Chambers in Collins St by May 1888. His son, Louis, would later have a studio in the same building.

McCubbin married Annie Moriarty in March 1889. They had seven children, of whom their son Louis McCubbin became an artist and director of the Art Gallery of South Australia 1936–1950. A grandson, Charles, also became an artist.

In 1901 McCubbin and his family moved to Mount Macedon, transporting a prefabricated English style home up onto the northern slopes of the mountain which they named Fontainebleau. It was in this beautiful setting, in 1904, that he painted The Pioneer, amongst many other works, and this is the only place that McCubbin ever painted fairies. The house survived the Ash Wednesday fires and stands today as a monument to the artist. It was at Macedon that he was inspired by the surrounding bush to experiment with the light and its effects on colour in nature.

McCubbin continued to paint through the first two decades of the 20th century, though by the beginning of World War I his health began to fail. He traveled to England in 1907 and visited Tasmania, but aside from these relatively short excursions lived most of his life in Melbourne. There he taught at the National Gallery of Victoria Art School, where his students included painters Clarice Beckett, William Beckwith McInnes, Hugh Ramsay, Jessie Traill and Hilda Rix Nicholas, and the photographer Ruth Hollick.

In 1912 he became the founding member of the Australian Art Association.

McCubbin died in 1917 from a heart attack.

== Legacy ==
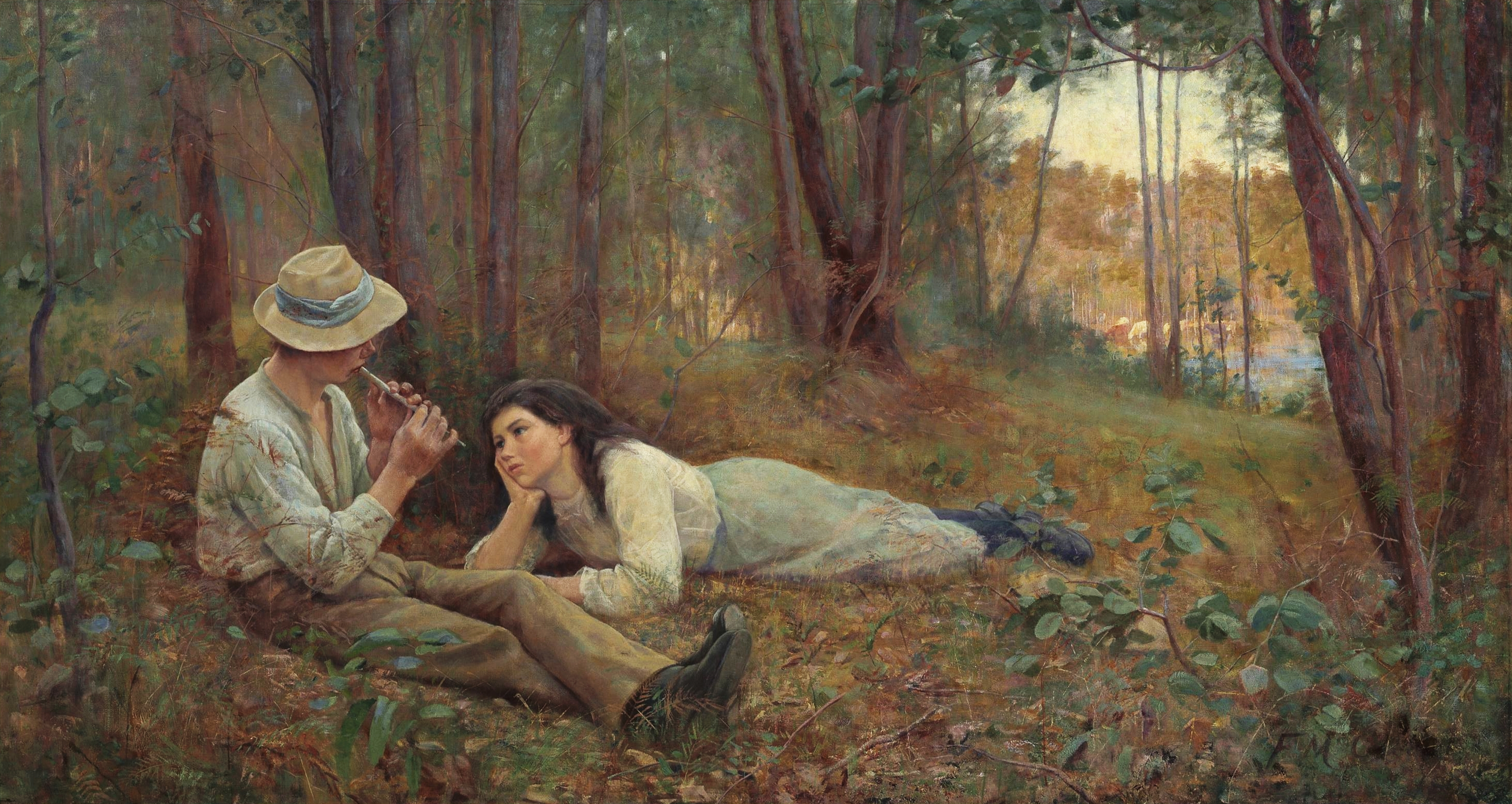
Bush Idyll, 1893

In 1998 McCubbin's painting Bush Idyll (1893) sold for $2,312,500, a then-record price for an Australian painting at public auction. Widely considered to be amongst the finest paintings in Australian art history, Bush Idyll was on long term display in the National Gallery of Australia, Canberra between 2017 and 2020 and between late 2021 and early 2022 it formed part of the key retrospective, 'Frederick McCubbin - Whisperings in wattle boughs" at the Geelong Gallery, Geelong.

On 25 February 2005, the 150th anniversary of his birth, the premiere of McCubbin: A Musical Biography of Frederick McCubbin by Peter Burgess was staged at Federation Square, Melbourne.

On 22 March 2016, McCubbin's painting An Old Politician (1879), resurfaced from a private vault in an Australian bank. The painting has not been viewed in public exhibition since its sale to a private collector in the 1880s.

In 2021, Geelong Gallery presented a survey of McCubbin's works in an exhibition titled Frederick McCubbin—Whisperings in wattle boughs. This exhibition celebrated Geelong's first major work to enter the collection in 1900: A bush burial (1890). The exhibition showed McCubbin’s key ‘pioneer’ subjects and additional paintings that show his fascination with the colour and nature of the bush.

McCubbin's letters to Tom Roberts, from the period 1891-1916, are held in the State Library of New South Wales.

== Works ==
"McCubbin creates an engulfing, claustrophobic landscape by barely suggesting any horizon and compressing midground and background. In contrast, the bush folk are portrayed as heroic figures."

Gallery

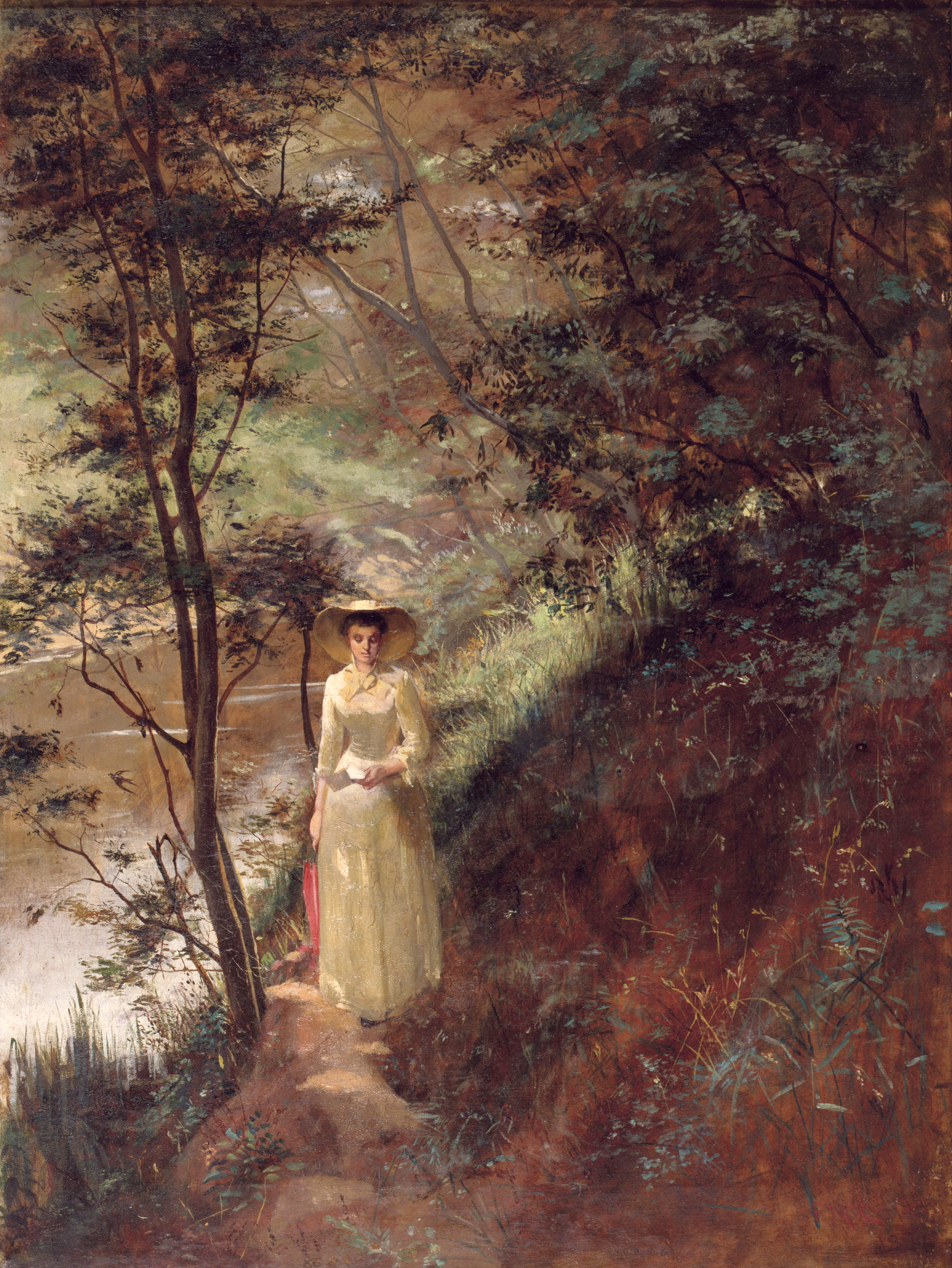
The Letter (McCubbin), 1884

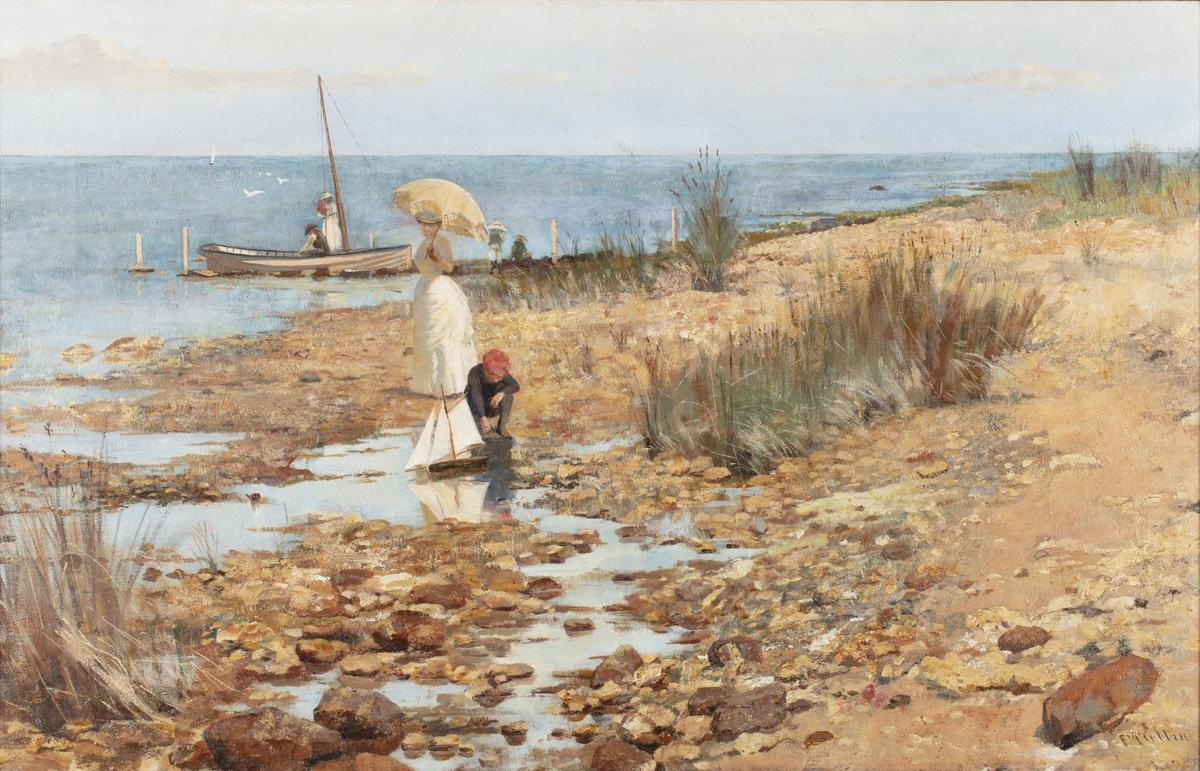
Moyes Bay, Beaumaris, 1887

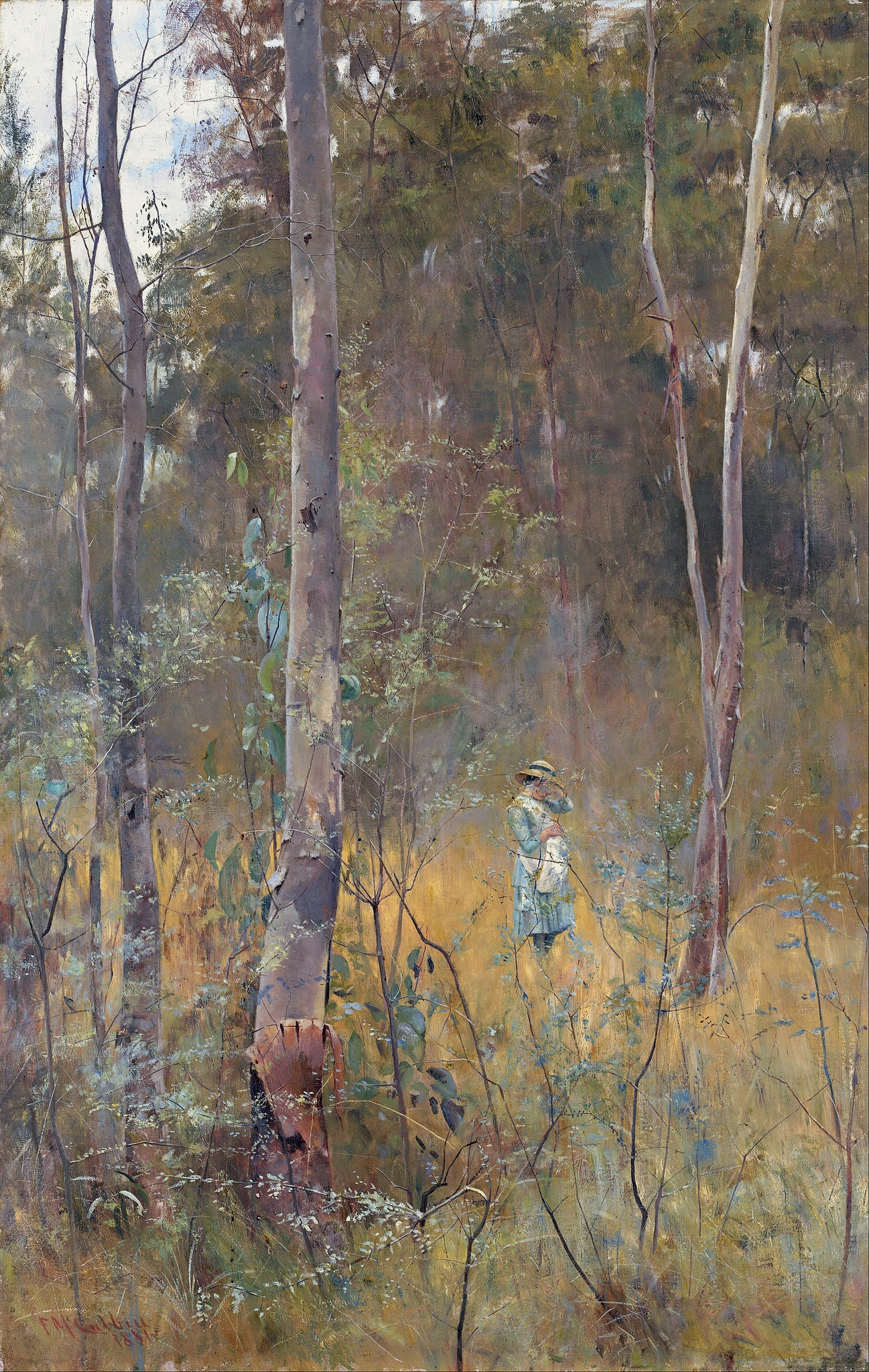
Lost, 1886

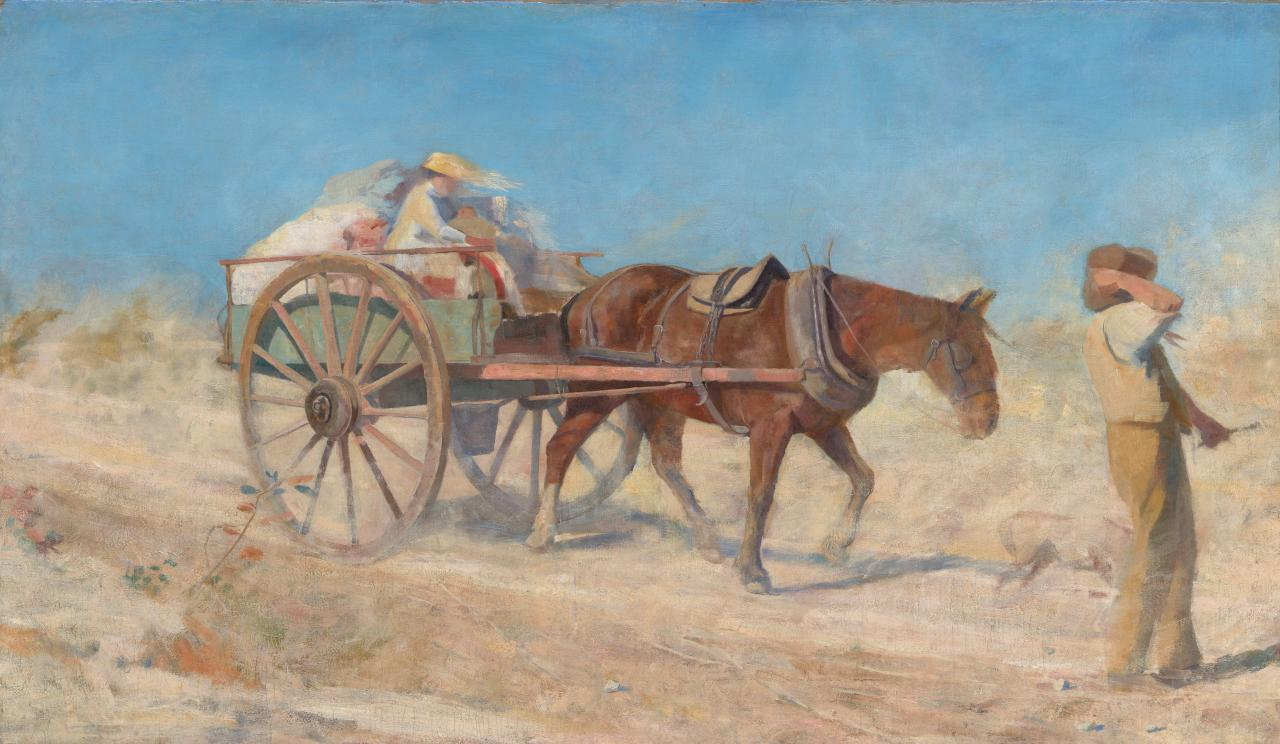
The North Wind, 1888

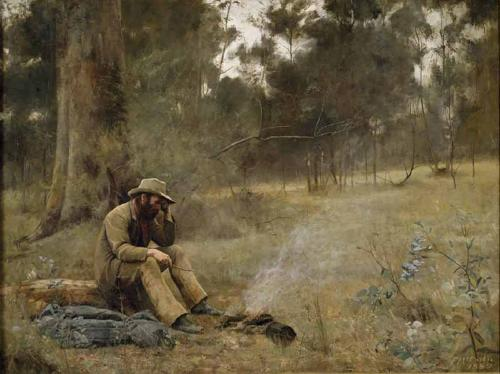
Down on His Luck, 1889

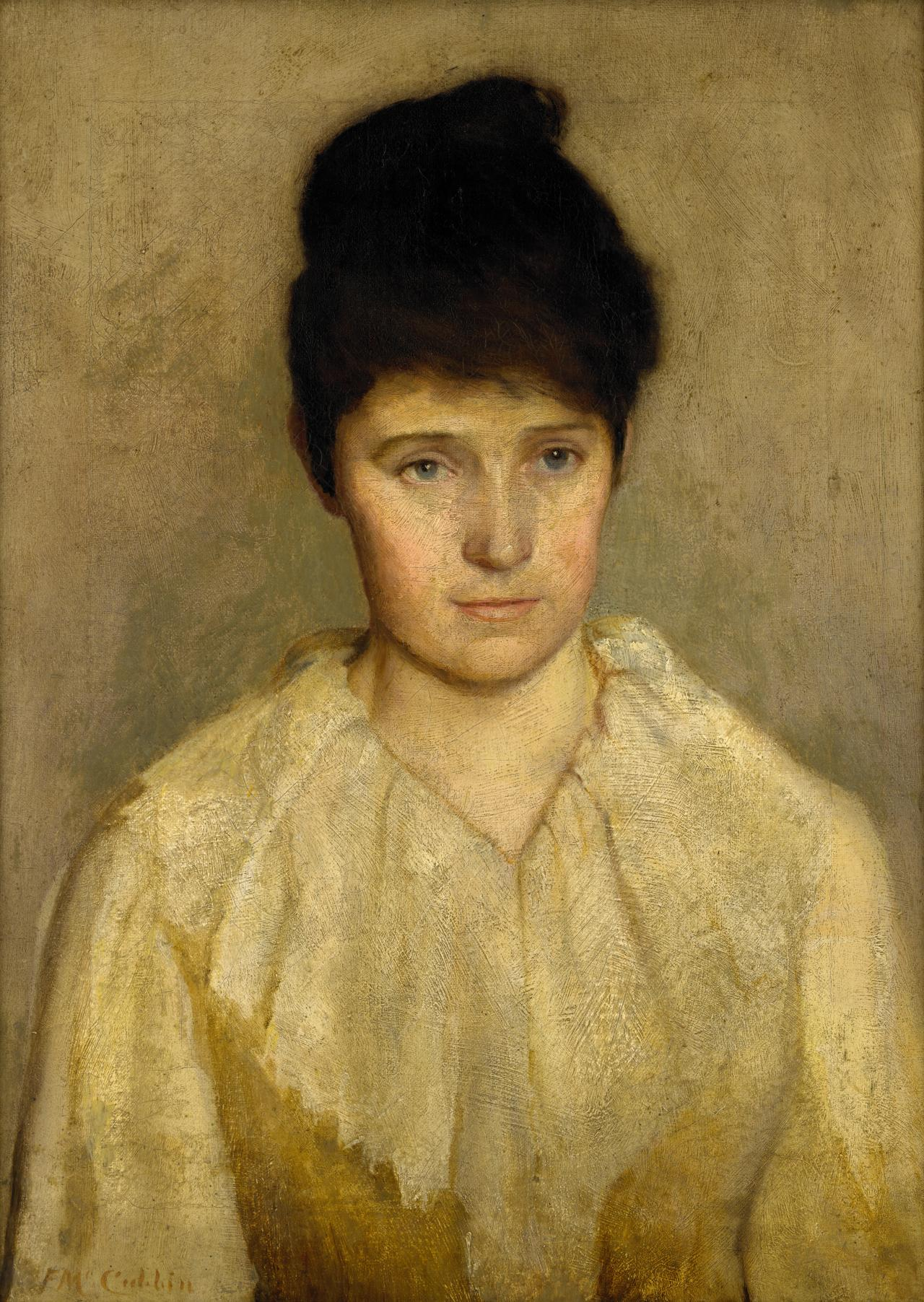
Mary, 1891

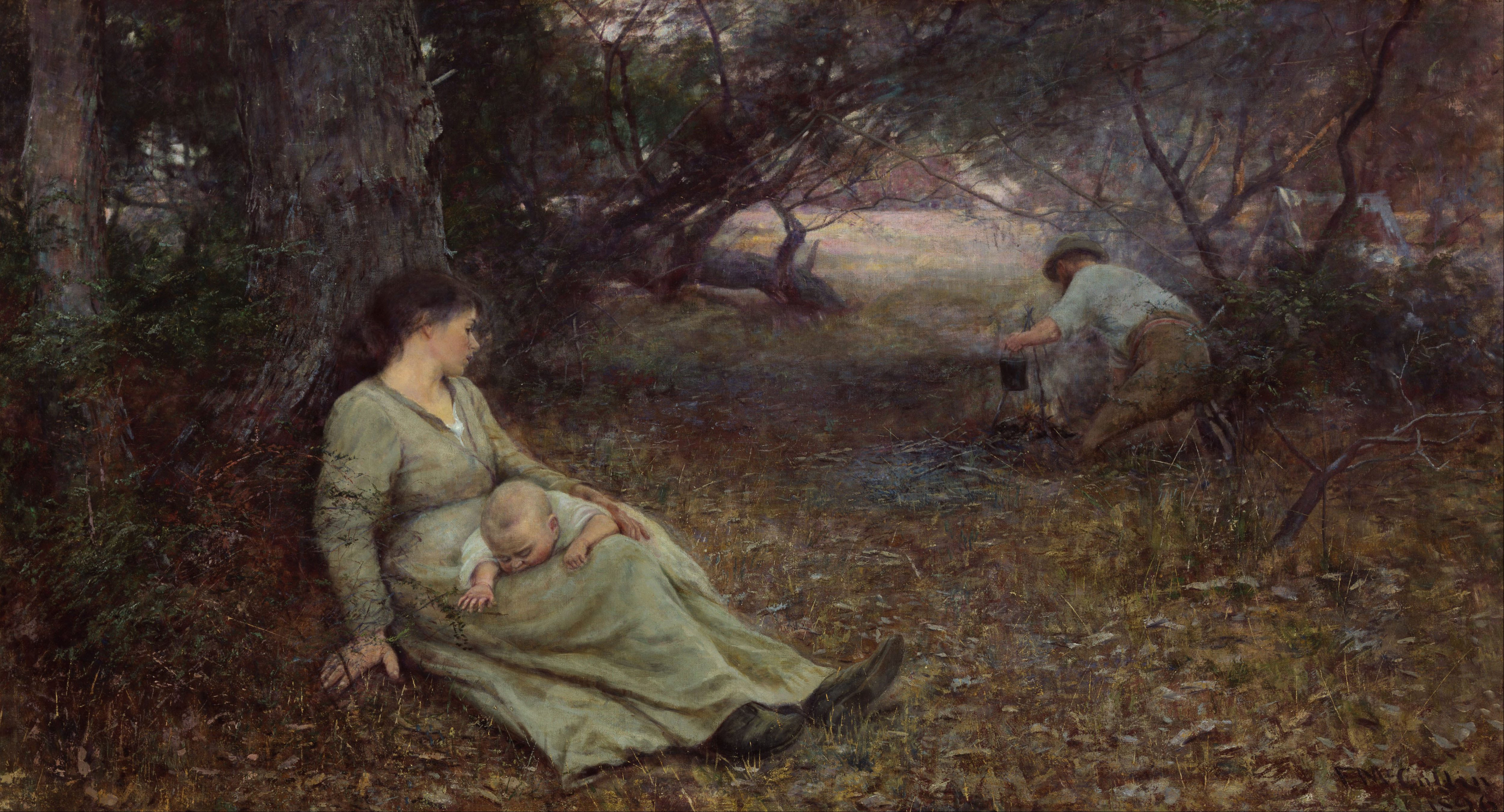
On the Wallaby Track, 1896

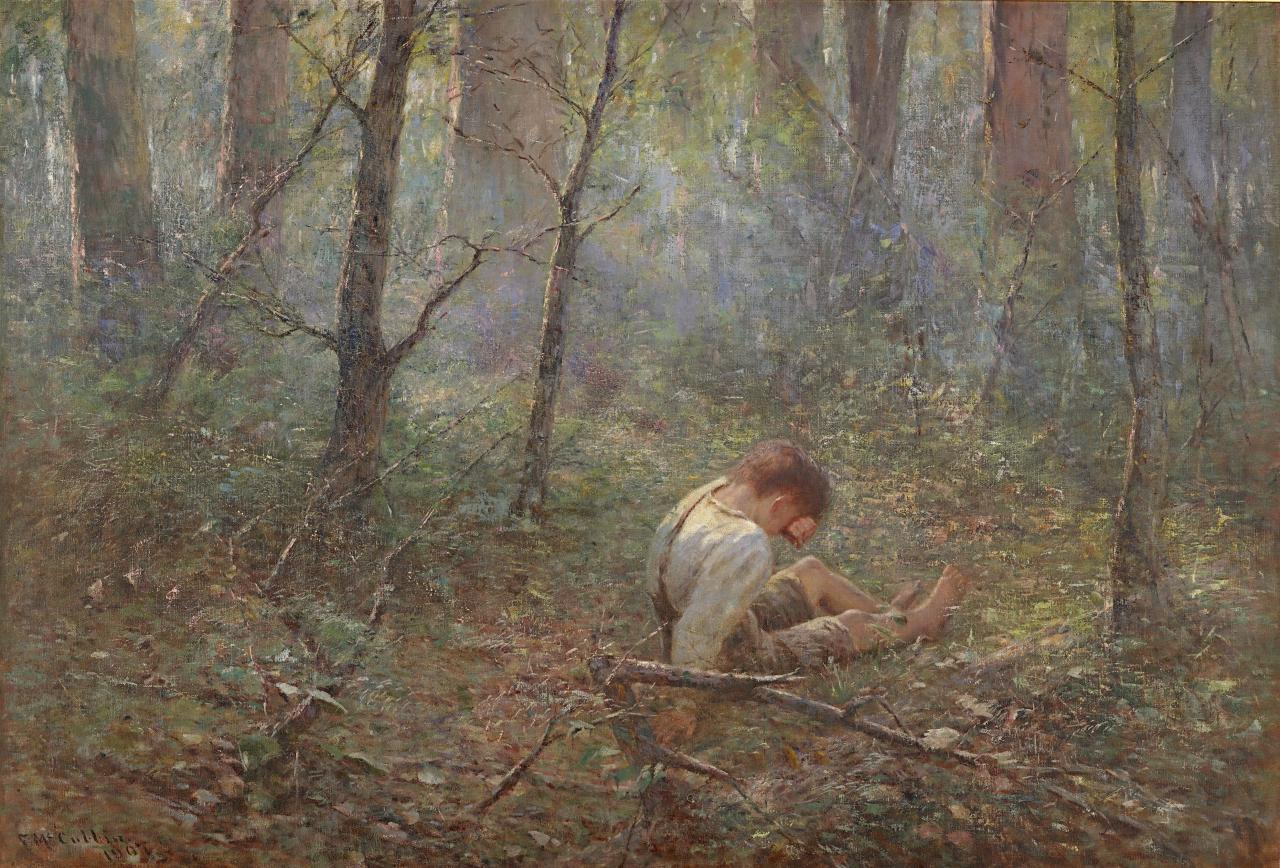
Lost, 1907

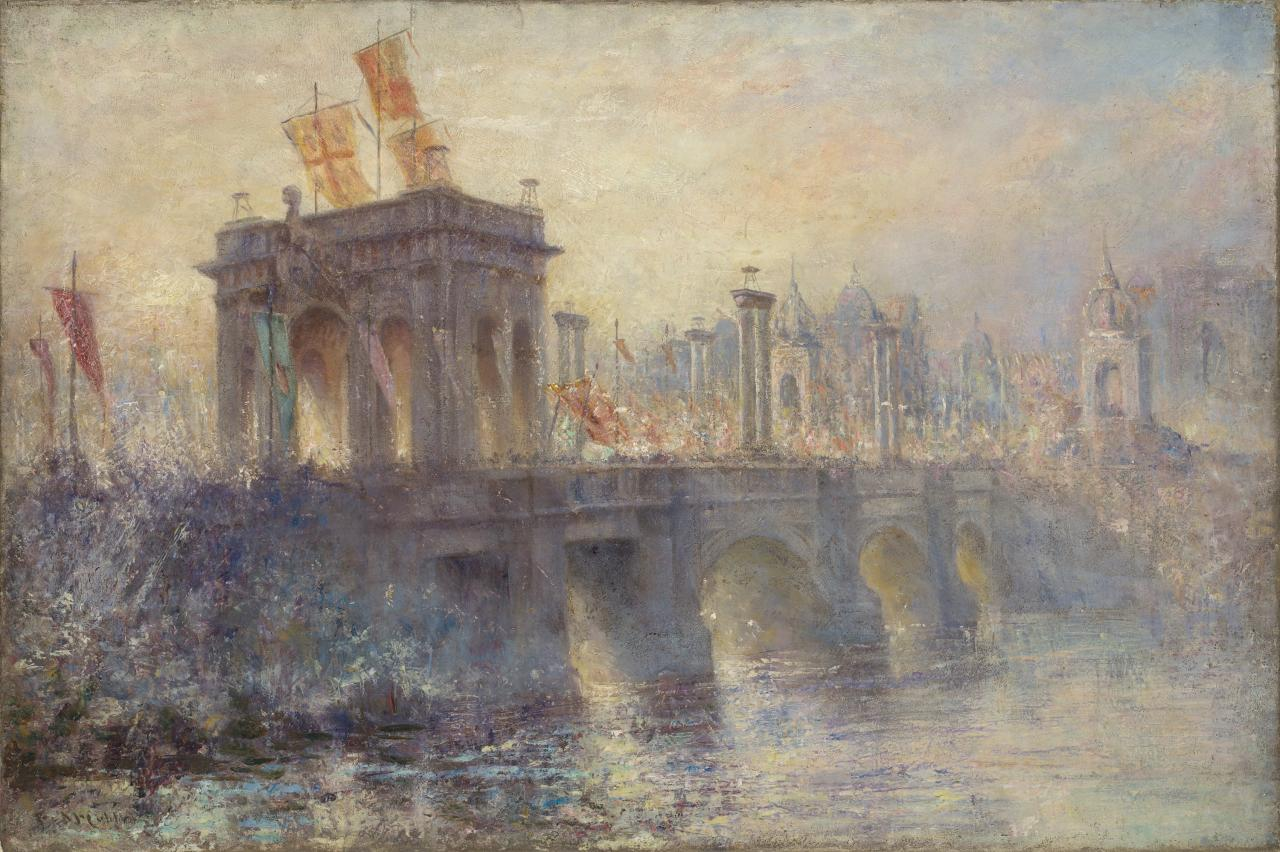
Princes Bridge, 1908

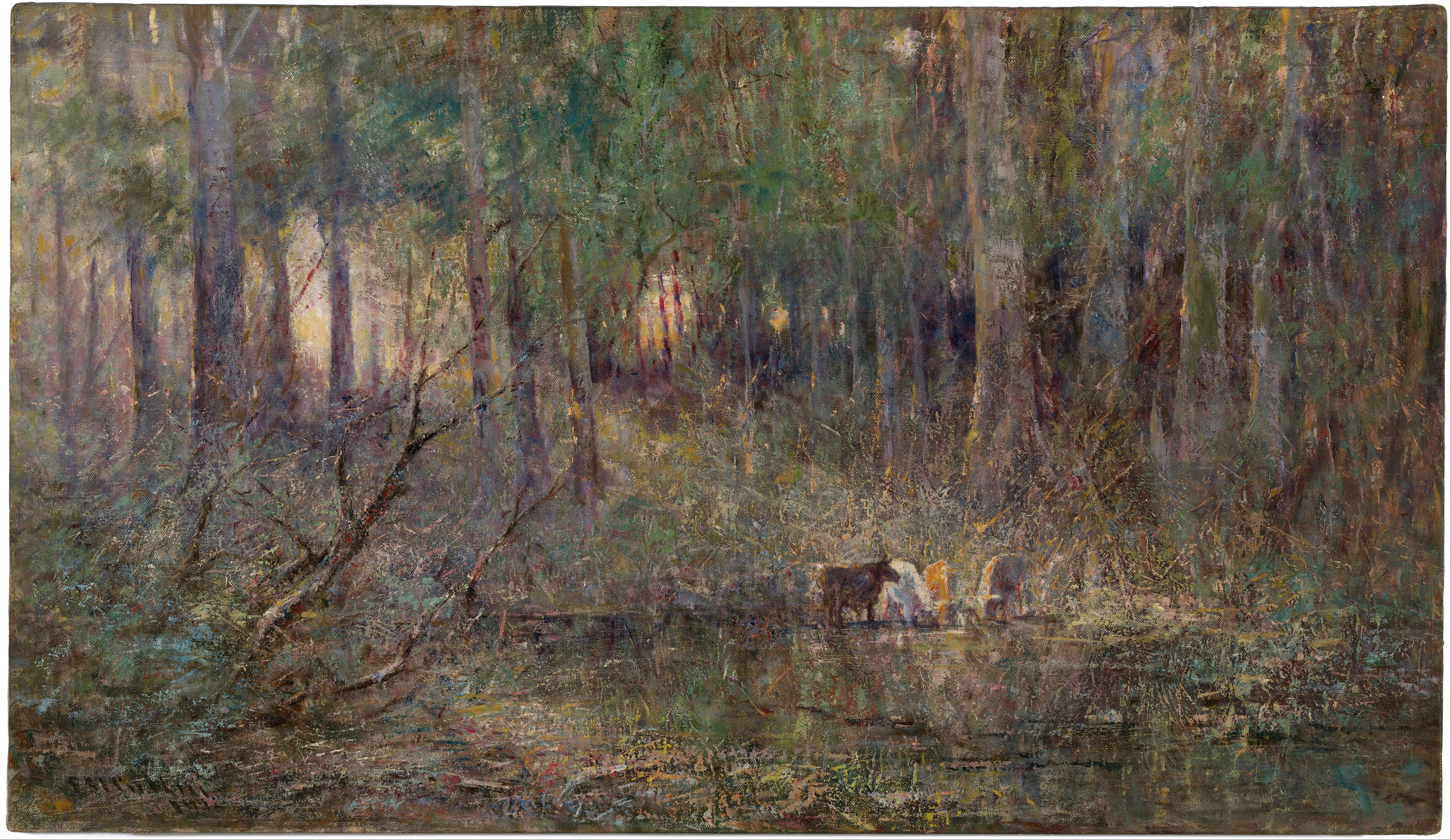
Violet and Gold, 1911

== See also ==
- Category:Paintings by Frederick McCubbin
- Visual arts of Australia
