= Pissarro (surname) =

Pissarro is a surname. Notable people with the name include:

- Camille Pissarro (1830–1903) French Impressionist painter

Sons of Camille:

- Félix Pissarro (1874–1897) painter, etcher and caricaturist
- Georges Henri Manzana Pissarro (1871–1961) French artist
- Lucien Pissarro (1863–1944) French painter, printmaker, and wood engraver
- Ludovic Rodo Pissarro (1878–1952) engraver
- Paul-Émile Pissarro (1884-1972) French impressionist and neo-impressionist painter

Grandchildren of Camille:

- Hugues Claude Pissarro (born 1935) French painter, son of Paul-Émile
- Orovida Camille Pissarro (1893–1968) British painter and etcher, daughter of Lucien
- Claude Bonin-Pissarro (1921–2021) French painter

Great-grandchildren of Camille:

- Joachim Pissarro (born 1959) art historian
- Frédéric Bonin-Pissarro (born 1964) French painter

Other family members:

- Esther Pissarro (1871–1951), British artist, married to Lucien

== See also ==
- Pizarro (disambiguation)
