= Lélia Pissarro =

Lélia Pissarro (Lélia Olga Sabine Edwige Pissarro) was born 27 July 1963 in Paris, France and is a contemporary French artist and gallery owner who lives and works in London. She is the great-granddaughter of Camille Pissarro.

== Early life in France ==
Lélia Pissarro is the third and youngest child of the artist Hugues Claude Pissarro and his first wife Katia, an art dealer. Until the age of 11 Lélia grew up in the care of her paternal grandparents Paul-Émile Pissarro and his wife Yvonne in the small Calvados farming hamlet of Clécy where she also lived with her brother Joachim Pissarro, an art historian. The middle sibling, Lionel Pissarro was raised in their parent's household. During this time Paul-Émile taught her fundamental Impressionist and Post-Impressionist techniques that he had learned from his father Camille Pissarro as well as some of his older brothers who were also artists; Ludovic-Rodo Pissarro, Felix (Titi) Pissarro, Georges-Henri (Manzana) Pissarro and the eldest, Lucien Pissarro.

== Career ==
Lélia Pissarro sold a work from her first series to Wally Findlay, a New York art dealer at the age of four, since then her work has been regularly exhibited around the world. After returning to Paris to live with her parents Lélia had her first exhibition at the Salon de la Jeune Peinture, subsequently taking part in an exhibition at the Luxembourg Museum in Paris. A year later she began her formal education at the Ecole des Beaux-Arts in Tours.

With her parents dividing their time between France and California, Lélia found herself moving between Tours, Paris and San Francisco. Whilst in Paris, Lélia taught art at the Moria School and studied oil painting restoration under Madame de Pangalleria at the laboratory of the Louvre. She had solo exhibitions in Paris, Lyon, Mulhouse and Rennes.

After moving to London in 1988 Lélia participated in a series of exhibitions entitled Pissarro: The Four Generations. These exhibitions have been mounted in London, Tel Aviv, five major museums in Japan and the Museum of Art in Fort Lauderdale, Florida.

Lélia moved to London after marrying the art dealer David Stern in 1988 and Stern Pissarro Gallery was created. The gallery has evolved into an international art business offering a collection of Impressionist, Modern and Contemporary art and specialising in Camille Pissarro as well as his descendants who became artists. Situation in the heartland of the London art scene, the gallery occupies the Modernist Target House building designed by Rodney Gordon on St James Street in Mayfair.

In 1999, Lélia became one of the founders of the Sorteval Press, a group of artists dedicated to developing their skills and techniques in etching and printmaking. Their first exhibition took place at the Mall Gallery in London in December 1999.

Lélia's work includes La Foret d’Otilia, a pastel which was exhibited at the Christina Gallery along with Camille's exhibits.
