= Paul-Émile Pissarro =

French painter

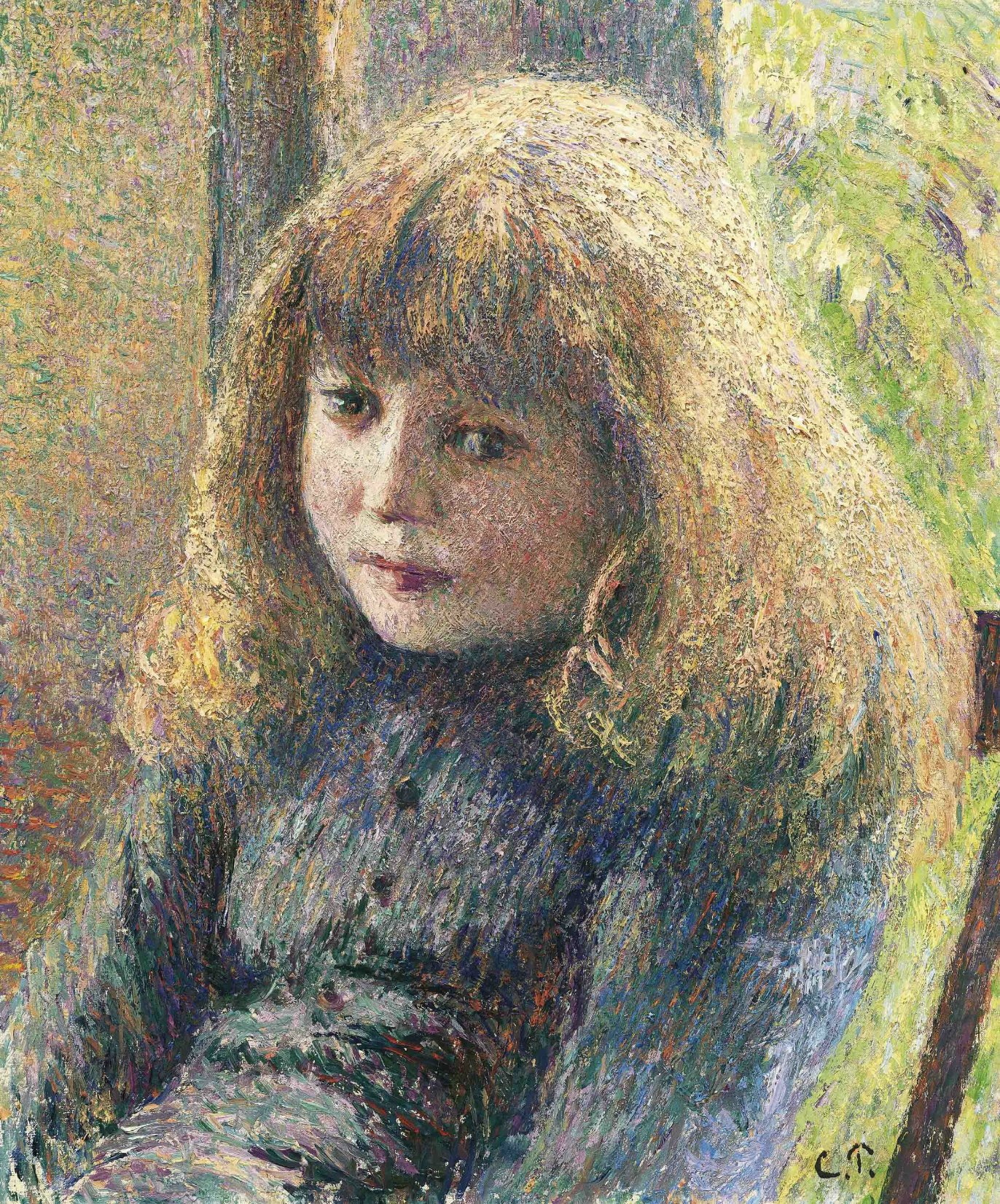
- Paul-Émile as portrayed c. 1890 by his father Camille Pissarro
- Born: 22 August 1884; Éragny, France
- Died: 20 January 1972 (aged 87); Clécy, France
- Resting place: Père Lachaise Cemetery, Paris
- Other names: Paulémile Pissarro, Paul Émile Pissarro
- Occupation: Painter
- Father: Camille Pissarro

Paul-Émile Pissarro, also Paulémile Pissarro or Paul Émile Pissarro (22 August 1884 in Éragny-sur-Epte, France – 20 January 1972 in Clécy in the department of Calvados, France) was a French impressionist and neo-impressionist painter. He came from the Pissarro family of artists.

== Life ==
Paul-Émile Pissarro was the fifth and youngest son of the impressionist painter Camille Pissarro and his wife Julia (née Vellay). His siblings were Lucien, Jeanne, Félix, Georges Henri Manzana, Ludovic Rodolphe and Jeanne (Cocotte).

He grew up in the artistic surroundings of the family household in Paris. Encouraged by his father, he began to draw at an early age. The White Horse, which he drew at five years of age, was praised by the art critic Octave Mirbeau. Camille was also impressed and kept the drawing for his private collection. At fifteen Paul-Émile went to the academy in Gisors, but left again after a few months to accompany his father on a painting tour of Le Havre, Dieppe and Rouen. On his return to Paris he went to a private art academy, unlike his siblings, who were mainly taught by their father.

On his father's death in 1903, Paul-Émile returned to his mother in Éragny. The painter Claude Monet, who lived in the nearby Giverny, had been one of Camille's closest friends and was Paul-Émiles godfather; after Camille's death he became a teacher and close friend to Paul-Émile. Paul-Émile frequently visited Giverny, where Monet taught him painting and gardening, encouraging him to follow in his father's footsteps: "Work! Study! Do as your father did".

Along with his brother Ludovic Rodolphe, Pissarro exhibited for the first time in 1905, showing his impressionist landscape Bords de l'Epte à Éragny in the Salon des Indépendants of the Société des Artistes Indépendants. While his father had encourage Paul-Émile's artistic efforts, his mother urged him to take up a conventional career. From 1908 on Pissarro worked first as a car mechanic and then as a designer or laces and cloths. In his spare time he continued to paint. His brother Lucien, who lived in London, asked Paul-Émile to send him some watercolours for sale. Encouraged by British interest and the sale of his works, he left his position in the lace factory with the intention of devoting himself to painting.

With his wife Berthe (née Bennaiché) he moved to Burgundy. By the outbreak of the First World War he had just seriously started working as an artist. On account of his health he was freed from military service, which left him free to travel and to paint during the war. His brother arranged exhibitions for him in the New English Art Club (NEAC), the Baillie Gallery and at the Allied Artists Association in London.

Paul-Émile's work was heavily influenced by the painter Paul Cézanne, whose style his father had urged upon him. Paul-Émile met Cézanne several times in Paris, and his influence became evident in Pissarro's green-gold classical compositions from around 1918 onward. Cézanne also inspired his later use of palette knives rather than brushes. He also experimented with etching and printing, and made various woodcuts, some of which were first displayed in 1919 by Malcolm C. Salaman.

By the 1920s Paul-Émile Pissarro was established as a neo-impressionist painter. In this period he shared a studio in Paris with the artist Kees van Dongen. With him and the painters Maurice de Vlaminck, André Dunoyer de Segonzac and Raoul Dufy he travelled and painted in summer, spending winter in Paris. In 1924 he bought a house in Lyons-la-Forêt, a small village near Éragny, whose garden (designed by Monet) and surroundings offered him subjects for paintings, in particular the pastures, meadows and hills through which the river Epte peacefully flows. In the late 1920s and early 1930s Paul-Émile finally found his person style and reached the summit of his artistic development. In 1930, on the recommendation of Raoul Dufy, he travelled for the first time in the Suisse Normande where the river Orne, runs through the valley between Clécy and Le Vey. The blue hills, green meadows and peaceful waters of the river provided Pissarro with a new environment for his artistic work. He set up a studio in a houseboat – a converted rowing boat in his garden on the banks for the Orne – in which he could concentrate on his favourite subject, reflections in still waters. In this period he abandoned unmixed colours and deployed a palette with many mixed colours until finally he used brushes less and less and palette knives more and more.

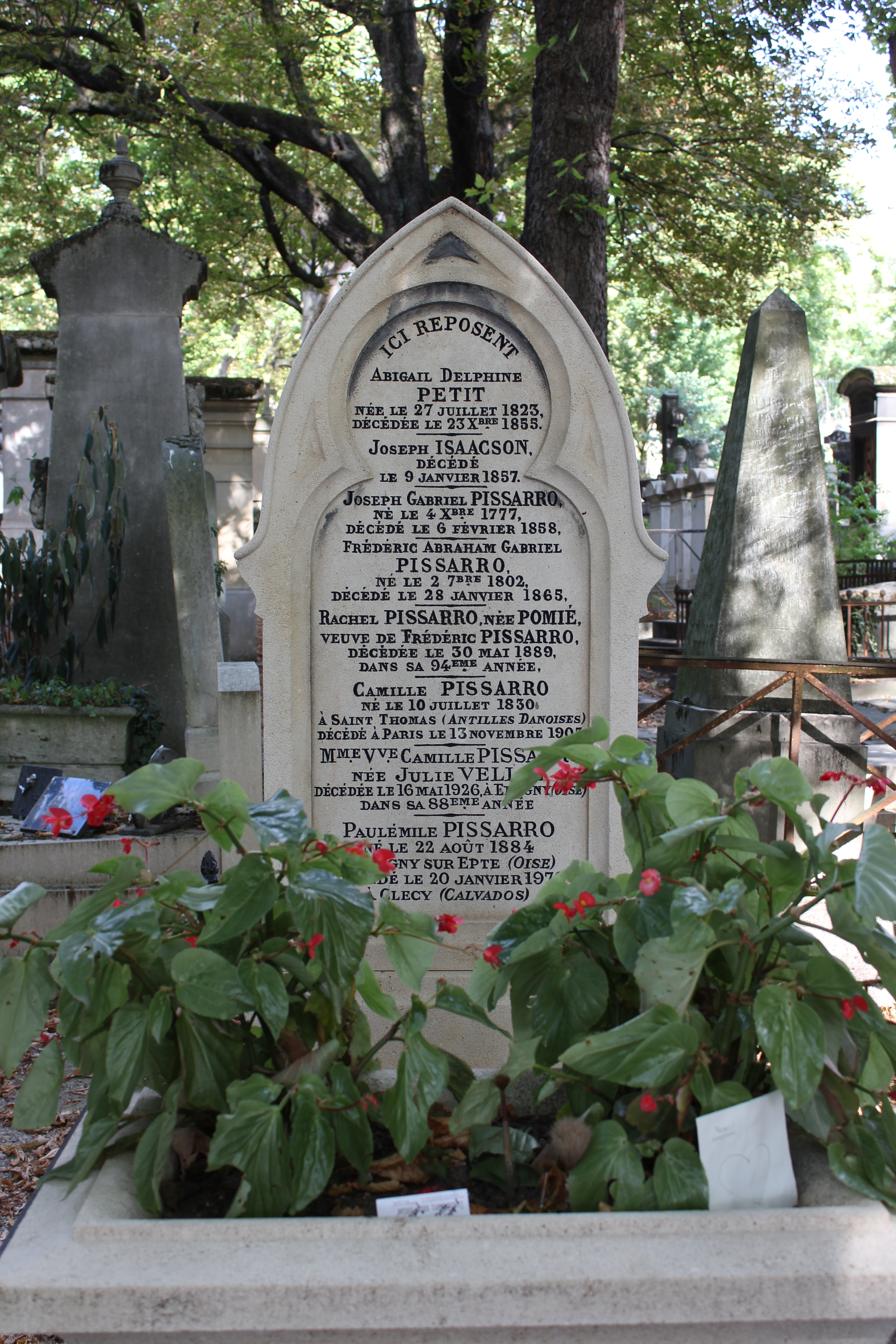
Paul-Émile Pissarro's grave in the Père Lachaise Cemetery

In 1935 Pissarro separated from his wife Berthe. In 1937, together with his second wife Yvonne Beaupel, he bought the house in Clécy in which he lived for the rest of his life. He had three children with Yvonne, Hugues Claude, Yvon and Véra; both sons also became artists. Many of the works that he produced in Clécy were exhibited in the following thirty years in the Salon des Indépendants.

In 1967 Paul-Émile Pissarro had his first solo exhibition in the United States, in the Wally Findlay gallery in New York, which brought broader recognition for his work and a degree of success as a painter which few other members of the Pissarro family achieved. After his death in 1972 Paul-Émile Pissarro's works were exhibited internationally several times. He was buried in the Père Lachaise Cemetery in Paris.

== Work ==
Paul-Émile Pissarro painted portraits and landscapes. He painted small villages in the Midi such as Treignac et Uzerche, the forests of Normandy and the Marais Poitevin.

=== Selected works ===
- La Maison Normande au Bord du Ruisseau
- Moulin de la Nation, c. 1930
- Le Pain de Sucre
- La Rivière, 1932
- Le Cheval Blanc, c. 1930
- Les Rochers près de la Rivière, c. 1940
- L'Orne à Clécy, Calvados, c. 1950
- Neige à Cantepie, c. 1950
- Les Meules de Foin, c. 1960
- Ombre et Soleil, c. 1960
- L'Orne à Cantepie, c. 1950
- Le Village sous la Neige, c. 1940
- Le Pont du Vey, c. 1940
- Chaumière à Cantepie
- Le Village de Landel

== Reception ==
In 1927, Malcolm C. Salaman showed several works of Paul-Émile in his publication on woodcuts and noted:

"M. Paulemile Pissarro had always a fond eye for the rustic scene, but engaging in their simplicity of treatment are his country-town impressions, such as Soliesville and Uzerche (p. 66 and p. 67)."

In Jewish Art. An illustrated history, Cecil Roth described Paul-Émile Pissarro's works in 1961 as:

"Paul-Emile Pissarro (born 1884) is known for his sensitive landscapes of the Ile de France and for his fine etchings."

== Literatur ==
- Stern Art Dealers: Paulémile Pissarro, 1884–1972, Retrospective Exhibition: Stern Art Dealers, London, 24th November to 20th December 1997. London 1997
- Anne Thorold, Kristen Erickson: Camille Pissarro and his family: the Pissarro collection in the Ashmolean Museum. Biografie und Autobiografie. Ashmolean Museum, 1993, p. 74
- Adrian M. Darmon (ed.): Around Jewish Art: A Dictionary of Painters, Sculptors, and Photographers Carnot, 2003, ISBN 2-84855-011-2. Entry Paulémile Pissarro, p. 93 → online
- (in French) Charles Kunstler: Trente-neuf reproductions de tableaux dont trois portraits par C. Pissarro. Girard & Brunino, Paris 1928
- (in German) W. G.: Pissarro, Paul Emile. In: Ulrich Thieme, Felix Becker (editors): Allgemeines Lexikon der Bildenden Künstler von der Antike bis zur Gegenwart. Band 27, E. A. Seemann, Leipzig 1933, S. 110.
- (in German) Hans Vollmer: Pissarro, Paul Emile in Allgemeines Lexikon der bildenden Künstler des XX. Jahrhunderts Vol 3: 3: K–P, p. 596. E. A. Seemann, Leipzig 1956

== Links ==
- Gemälde von Paul Émile Pissarro In: Stern Pissarro Gallery → online
