= Éragny-sur-Epte =

- Commune
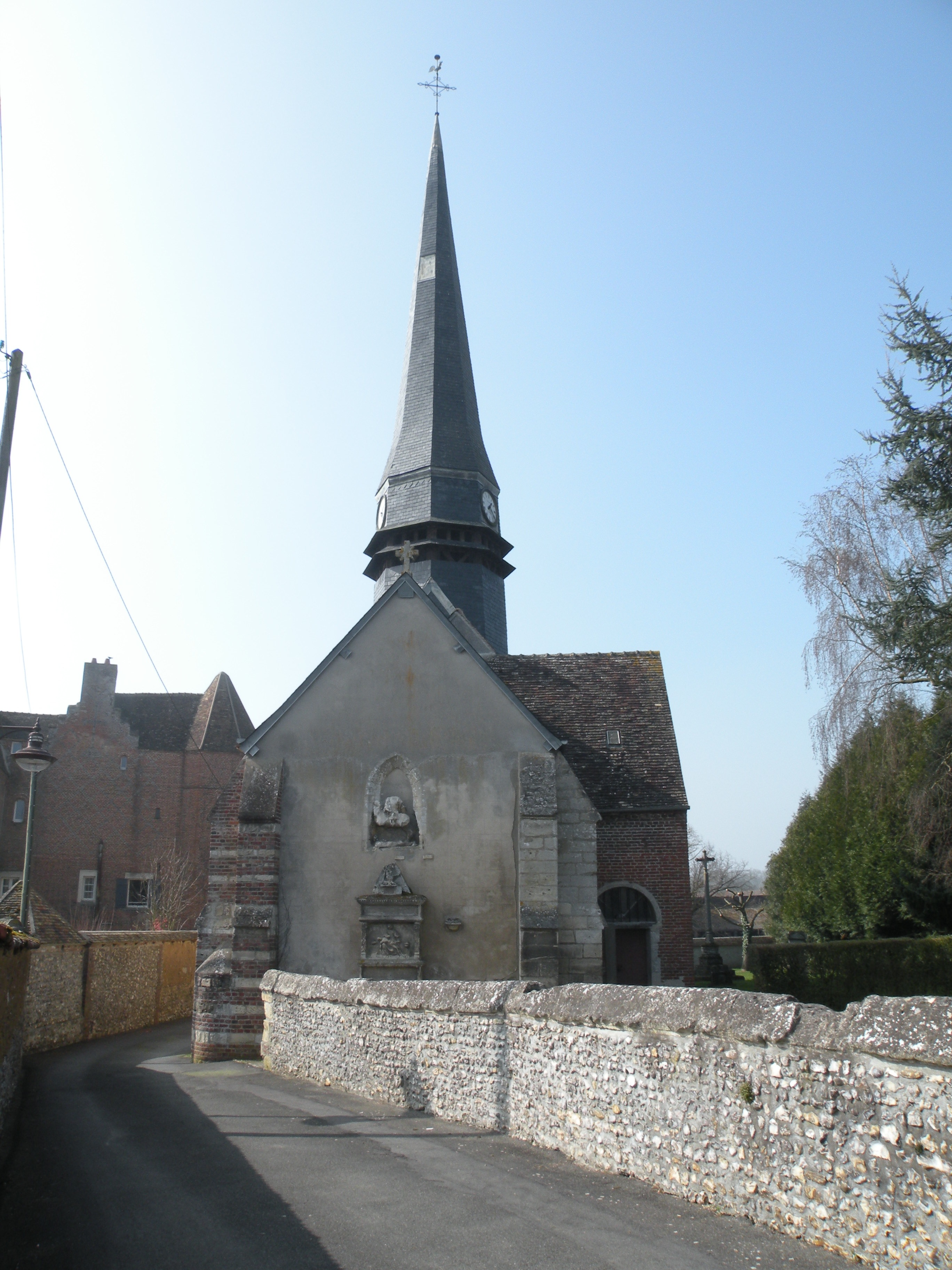
- Parish church of St Martin, Éragny-sur-Epte

- Coat of arms
- Location of Éragny-sur-Epte
- Location within France Location within Hauts-de-France
- Coordinates: 49°18′58″N 1°46′29″E
- Country: France
- Region: Hauts-de-France
- Department: Oise
- Arrondissement: Beauvais
- Canton: Chaumont-en-Vexin

Government
  - Mayor (2020–2026): Bernard Michalczyk
- Area^{1}: 8.53 km^{2} (3.29 sq mi)
- Elevation: 71 m (233 ft)
- Highest elevation: 124 m (407 ft)
- Lowest elevation: 51 m (167 ft)
- Population (2023): 598
  - Density: 70.1/km^{2} (182/sq mi)
- Time zone: UTC+01:00 (CET)
  - Summer (DST): UTC+02:00 (CEST)
- INSEE/Postal code: 60211 /60590
- ^{1} French Land Register data, which excludes lakes, ponds, glaciers > 1 km^{2} (0.386 sq mi or 247 acres) and river estuaries.

Éragny-sur-Epte (French pronunciation: [eʁaɲi syʁ ɛpt], literally Éragny on Epte) is a commune in the Oise department in northern France.

== History ==
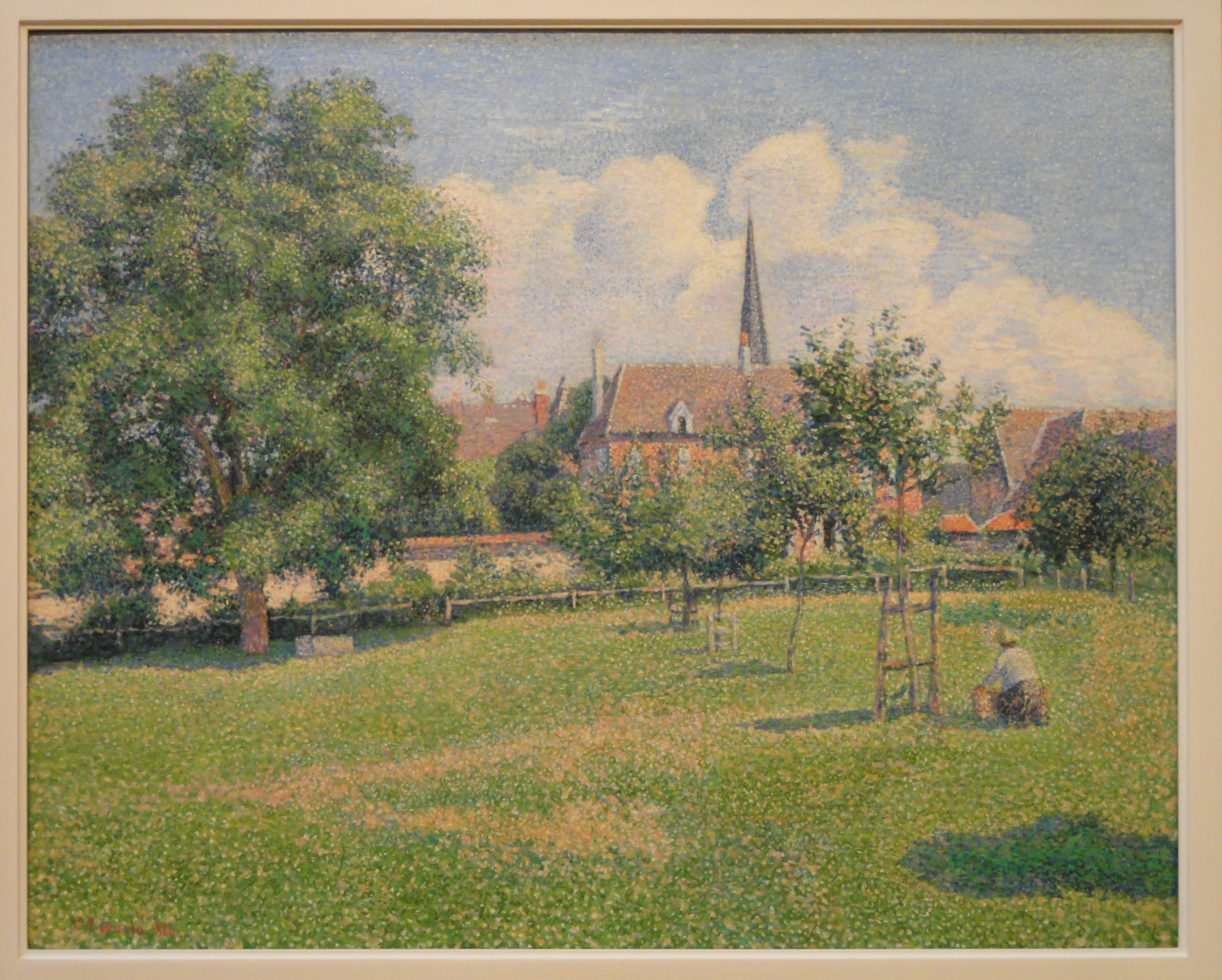
View of Éragny by Pissarro, 1886

Under the ancien régime, Éragny was owned by the Princes of Conti.

In 1859, there was a cotton mill called Saint-Charles, between Éragny and Gisors. At that time, it was reported that the manor house was partly ruined, with traces of fire in the attic, and what was left was the main building of the farm. This house, with octagonal turrets, was built in brick and had two spiral staircases. The people of the place then worked in farming or in the cotton mill.

Éragny was served by the Saint-Denis to Dieppe railway from 1870. During the Franco-Prussian War of that year, the Prussians set fire to the houses of Éragny soon after entering Gisors on 9 October 1870.

== Camille Pissarro and Éragny ==
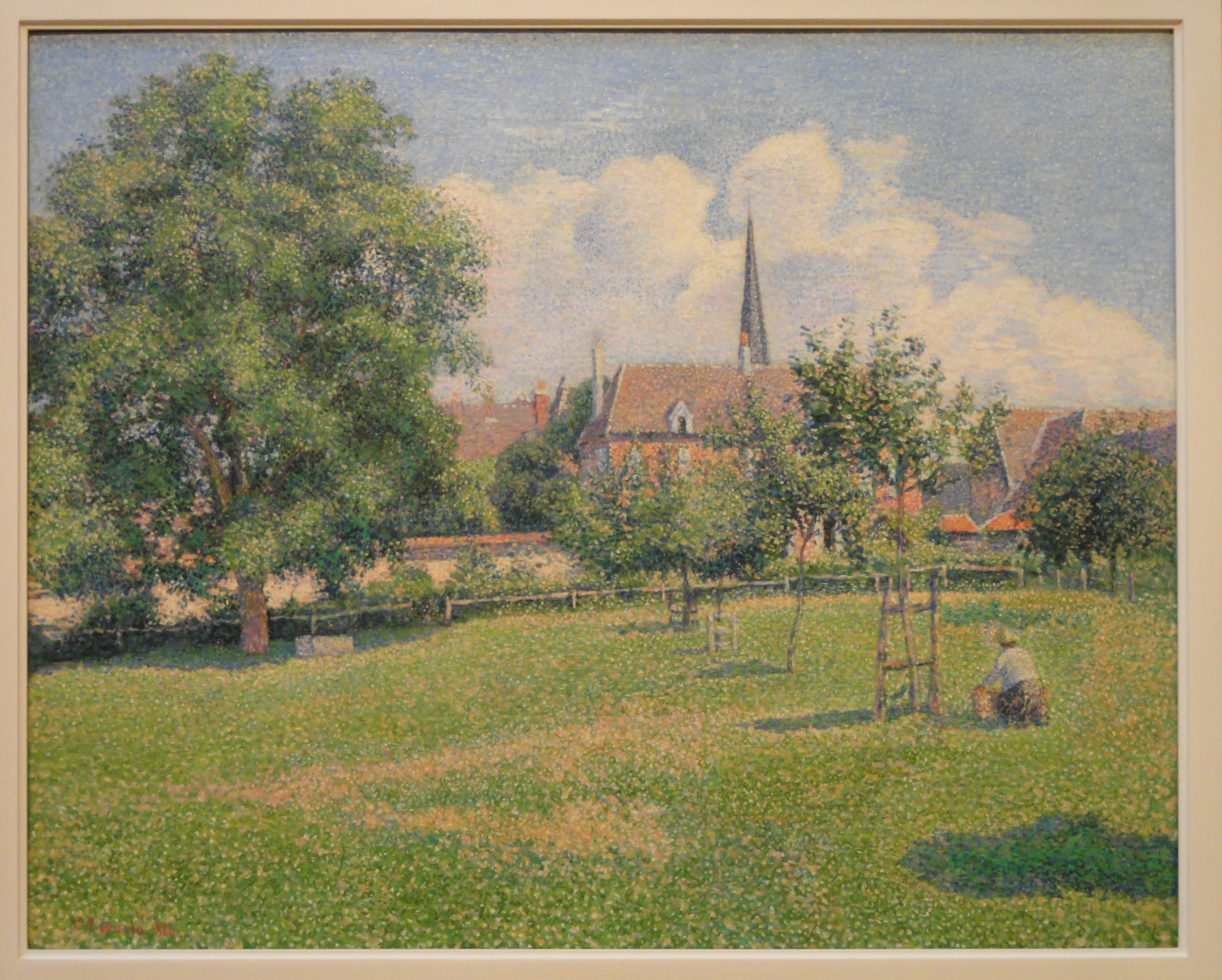
The House of the Deaf Woman and the Belfry at Éragny, 1886

In April 1884, the Impressionist painter Camille Pissarro and his family settled at Éragny-sur-Epte, where he would live for the remainder of his life. Writing to his son Lucien on 1 March 1884, Pissarro described the property as a "superb" house with a garden and meadows and expressed particular enthusiasm for the surrounding countryside. The Pissarros initially rented the property. When it was offered for sale in 1892, Pissarro sought financial assistance from his longtime friend Claude Monet, who lived at Giverny. Monet agreed to make funds available for the purchase, helping Pissarro and his wife Julie acquire the house. In correspondence concerning the purchase, Monet referred to their longstanding friendship, writing: "Nous sommes d'assez vieux amis pour nous rendre des services" ("We are old enough friends to do each other favors").

=== House and studio ===
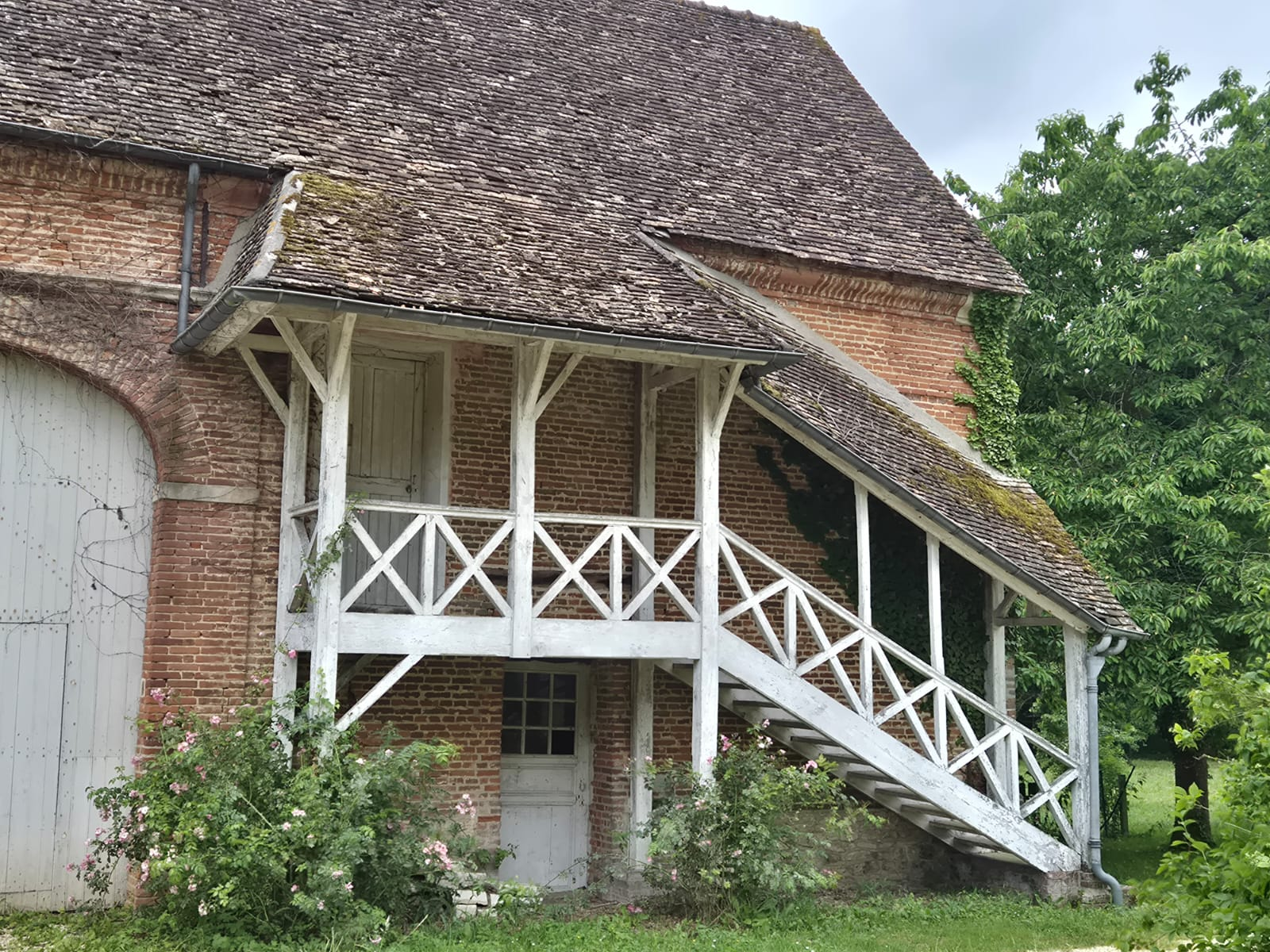
Pissarro's studio at Éragny-sur-Epte in 2026

In 1893, Pissarro substantially altered the barn in the garden to create a large studio on its upper floor. The north wall was fitted with a large arched glazed opening approximately three metres wide, while a west-facing window overlooked the orchard and the countryside beyond. Access to the studio was provided by a covered exterior staircase. The elevated viewpoints from the studio became important working positions for Pissarro. Museum research has identified a number of Éragny landscapes painted from its windows, particularly views across the orchard and towards the neighbouring village of Bazincourt-sur-Epte. The studio and garden were listed as a French Monument historique on 1 July 1998. The French Ministry of Culture describes the property as a lieu de mémoire ("place of memory") associated with Pissarro and records the house, barn, studio, garden and orchard as central elements of the site.

=== Éragny in Pissarro's work ===
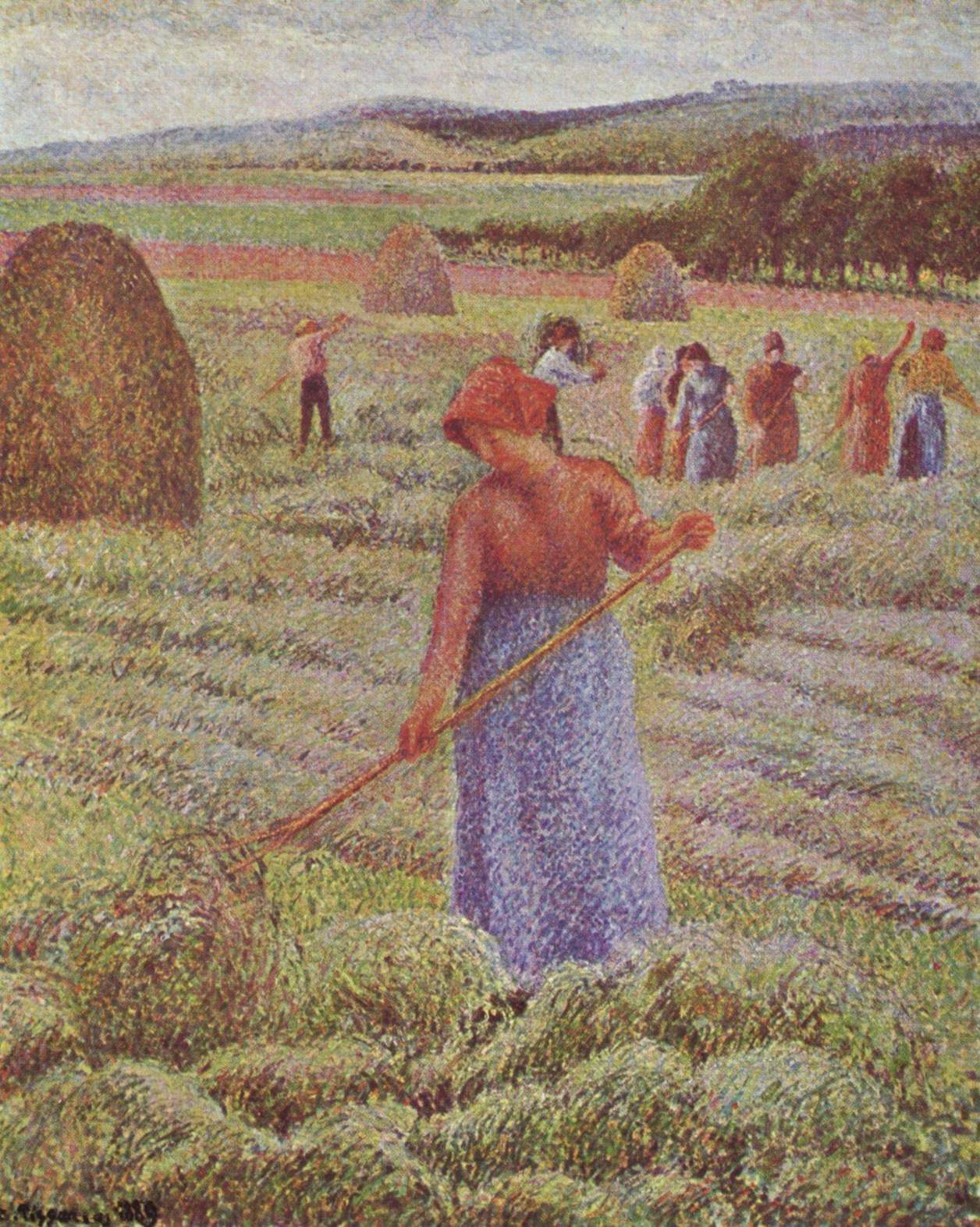
Hay Harvest at Éragny-sur-Epte, 1889

The house, garden, orchard, meadows, agricultural workers and surrounding countryside provided Pissarro with subjects throughout the final nineteen years of his career. His Éragny paintings include both Impressionist and Neo-Impressionist works and frequently depict rural labour, changing seasons and views across the Epte valley. Works painted in and around Éragny are today held by numerous major international collections, including the Musée d'Orsay, the National Gallery, London, the Metropolitan Museum of Art, the National Gallery of Art, Washington, the Ashmolean Museum, the National Gallery of Canada and other institutions. His children also spent part of their youth at Éragny. Several became artists, including Lucien Pissarro, Georges Henri Manzana Pissarro, Ludovic-Rodo Pissarro and Paul-Émile Pissarro. In 1894, Lucien used the village's name for the Eragny Press, the private press he established with his wife Esther in England.

== Cultural legacy ==
In 2017, the Musée du Luxembourg in Paris presented Pissarro in Éragny: Nature Regained (Pissarro à Éragny: La nature retrouvée), an exhibition devoted specifically to the final two decades of Pissarro's career at Éragny-sur-Epte. Organised by the Réunion des Musées Nationaux – Grand Palais and curated by art historians Richard Brettell and Joachim Pissarro, it brought together around one hundred paintings, drawings and prints produced at Éragny between 1884 and 1903, along with family archives, from museum and private collections worldwide. The exhibition and its accompanying catalogue were among the first major projects devoted specifically to the Éragny period rather than to Pissarro's career as a whole.

== Land use ==
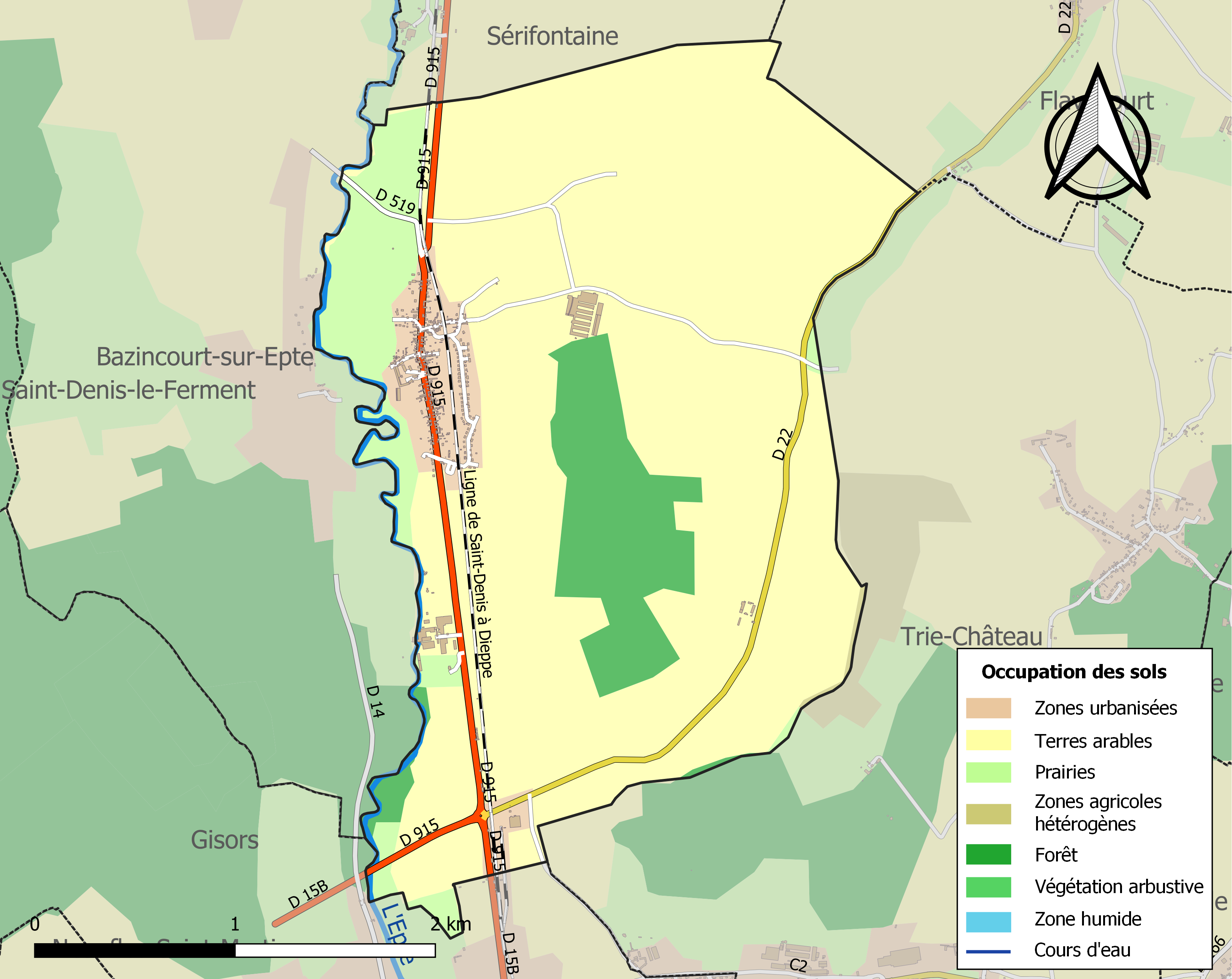
Land use map for Éragny-sur-Epte, 2018, with arable land coloured solid yellow, woodland solid green

The history of local land use can be seen from the 18th-century Cassini map, the general staff maps of 1820–1866, and the IGN maps and aerial photos for 1950 to the present day. In 2018, the land use of the commune was reported in the Corine Land Cover database as agricultural 84.9 per cent, only slightly down from 85.3 per cent in 1990, and urbanized areas 5.3 per cent. Arable land was 76.8 per cent, woodland 9.8, and meadow 8.0.

== Gallery ==
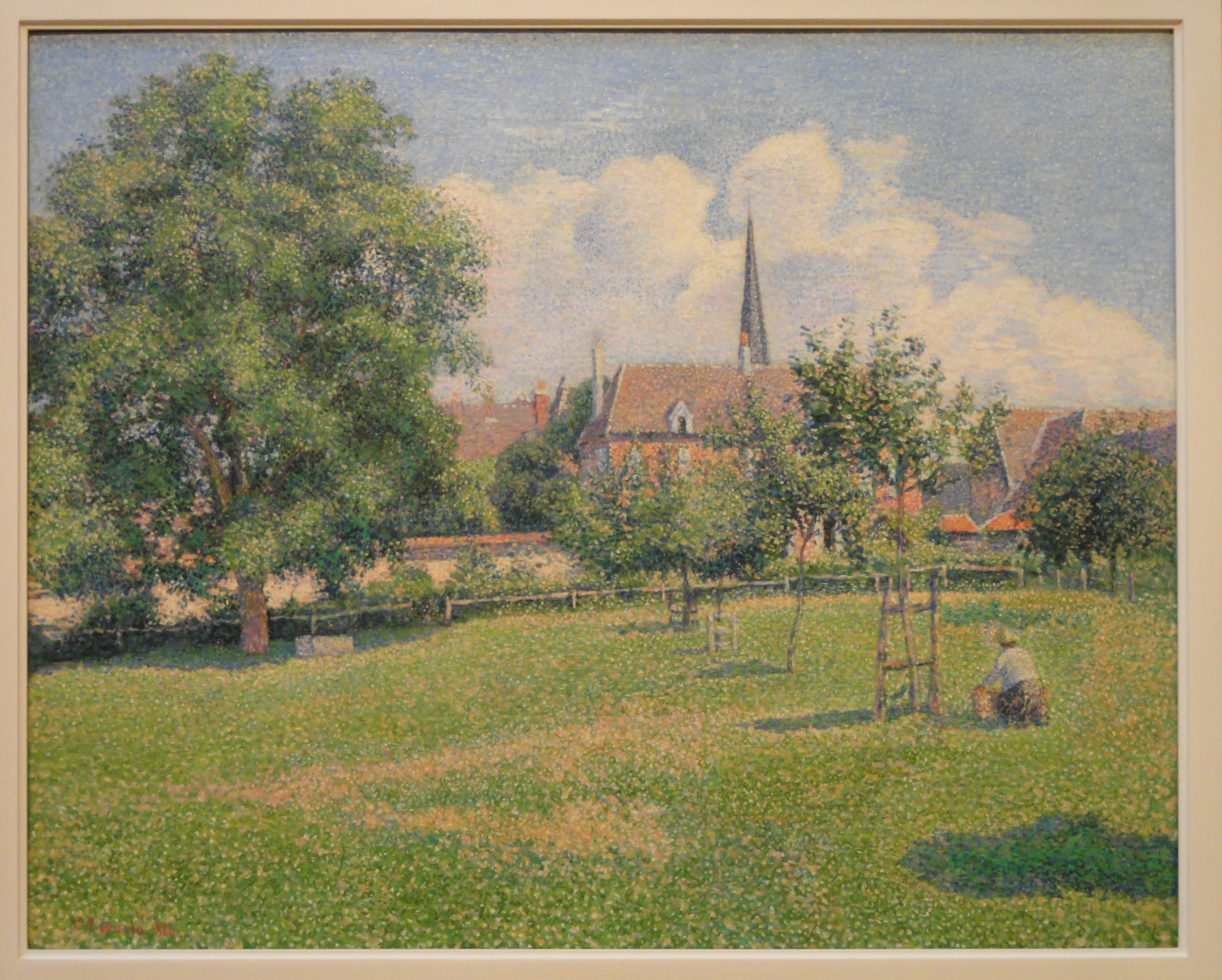
The House of the Deaf Woman and the Belfry at Éragny, 1886

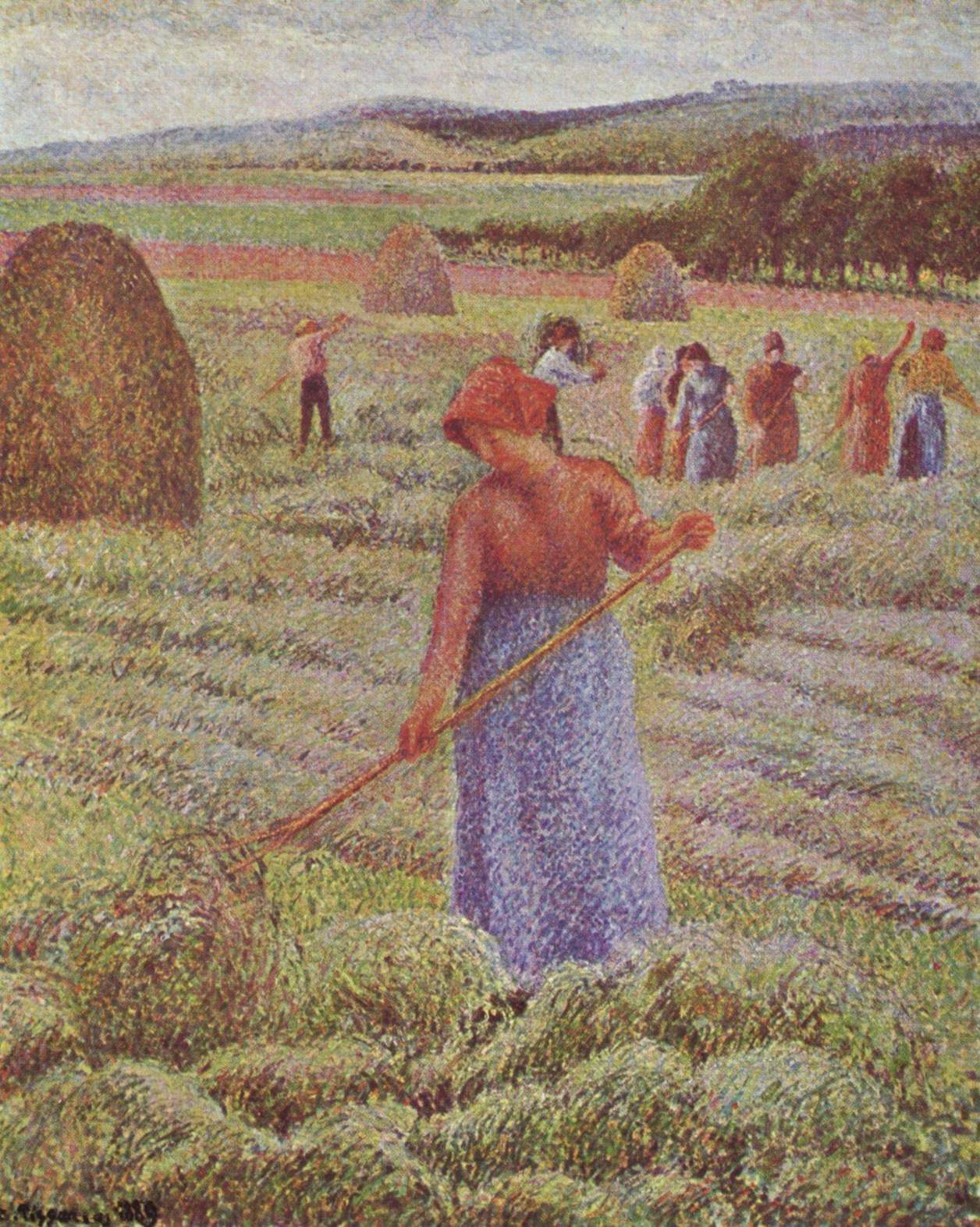
Hay Harvest at Éragny-sur-Epte, 1889

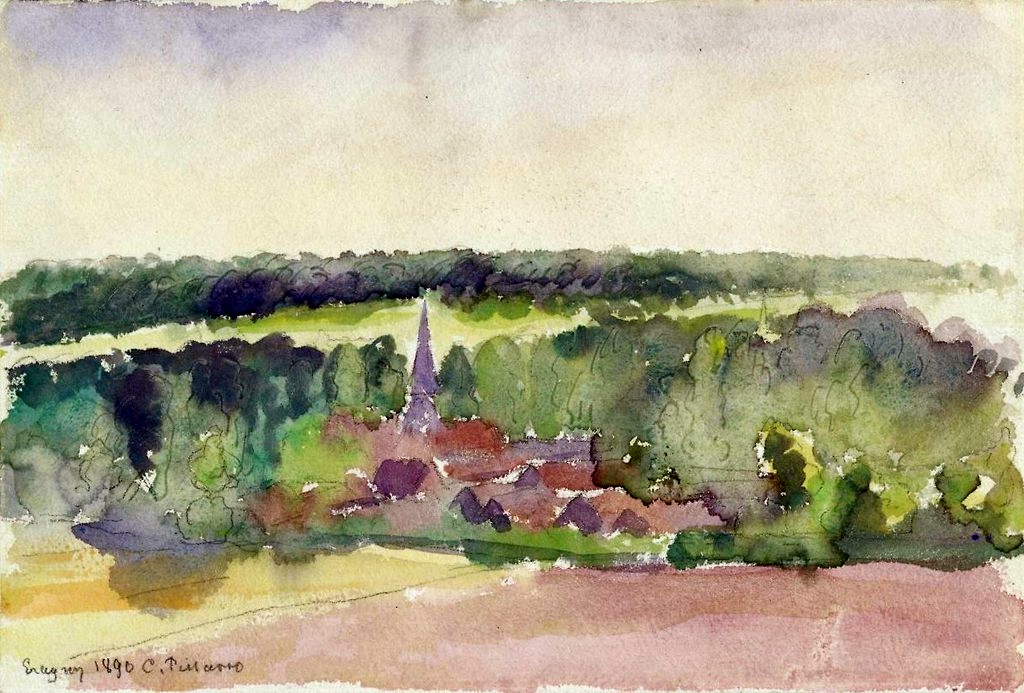
View of Éragny, c. 1890

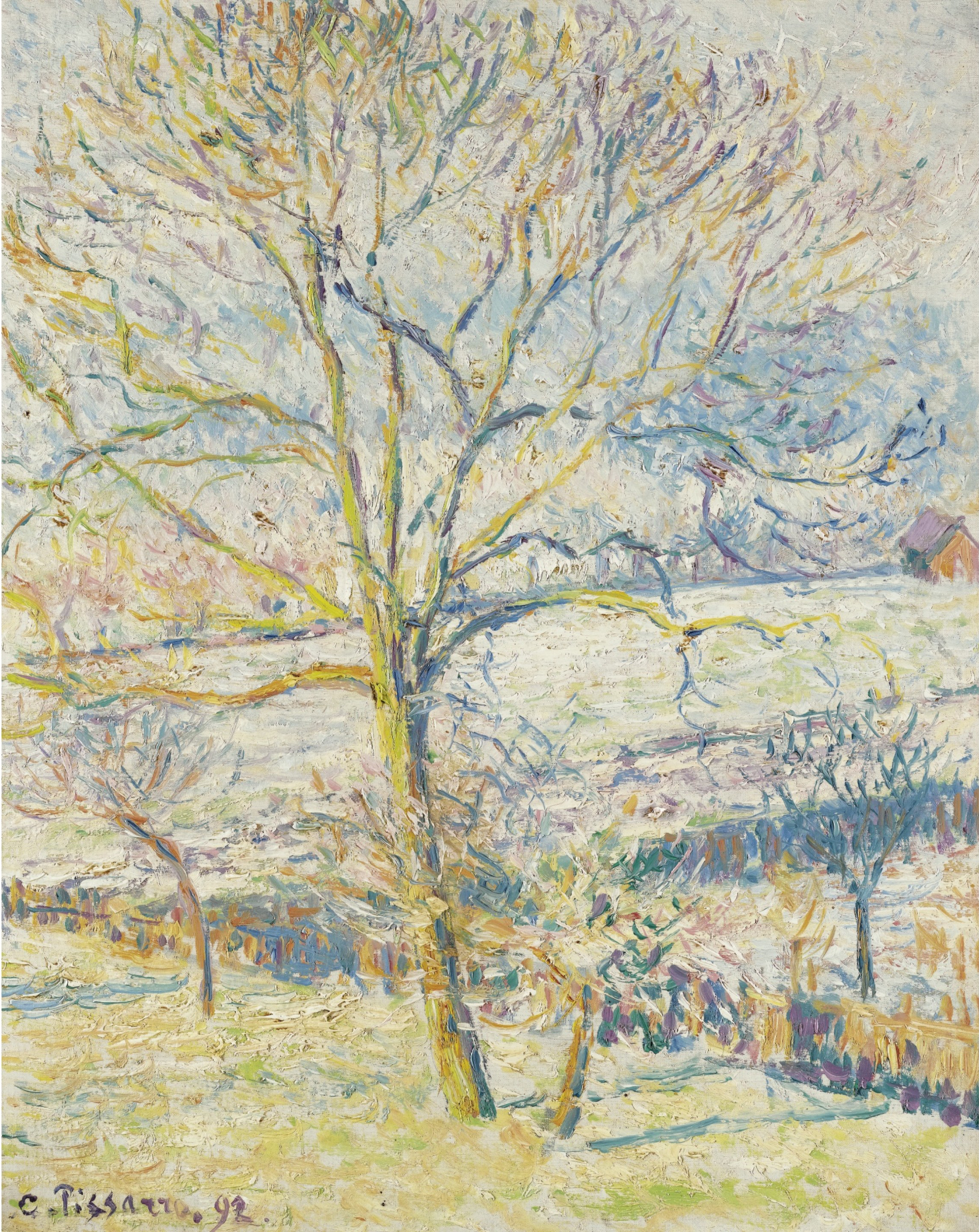
The Great Walnut Tree, Hoarfrost, Éragny, 1892

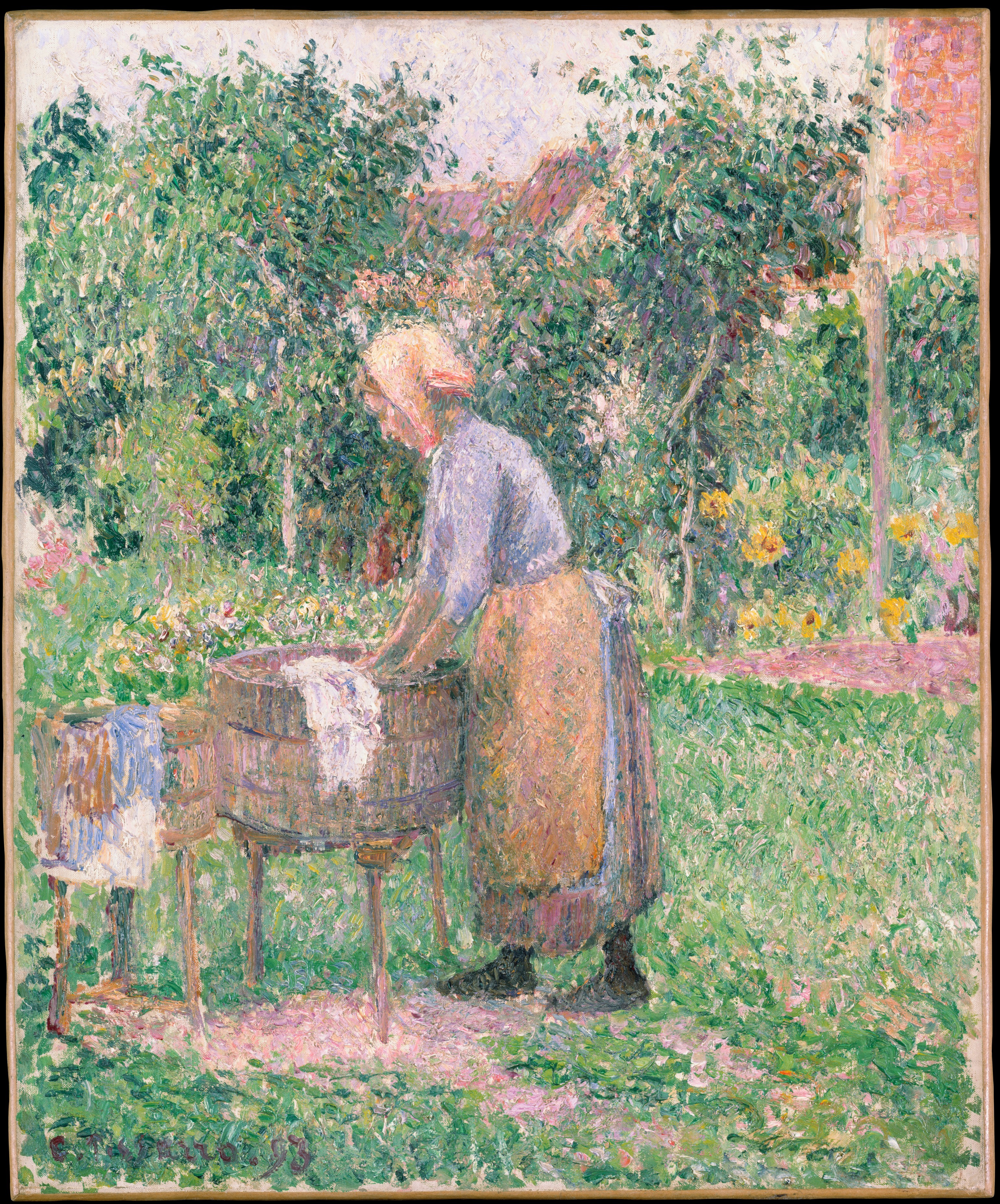
A Washerwoman at Éragny, 1893

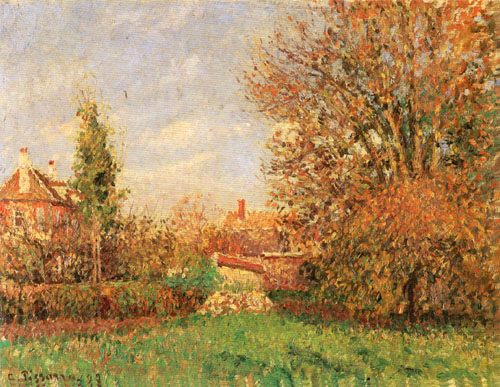
Autumn in the Meadow at Éragny, 1899

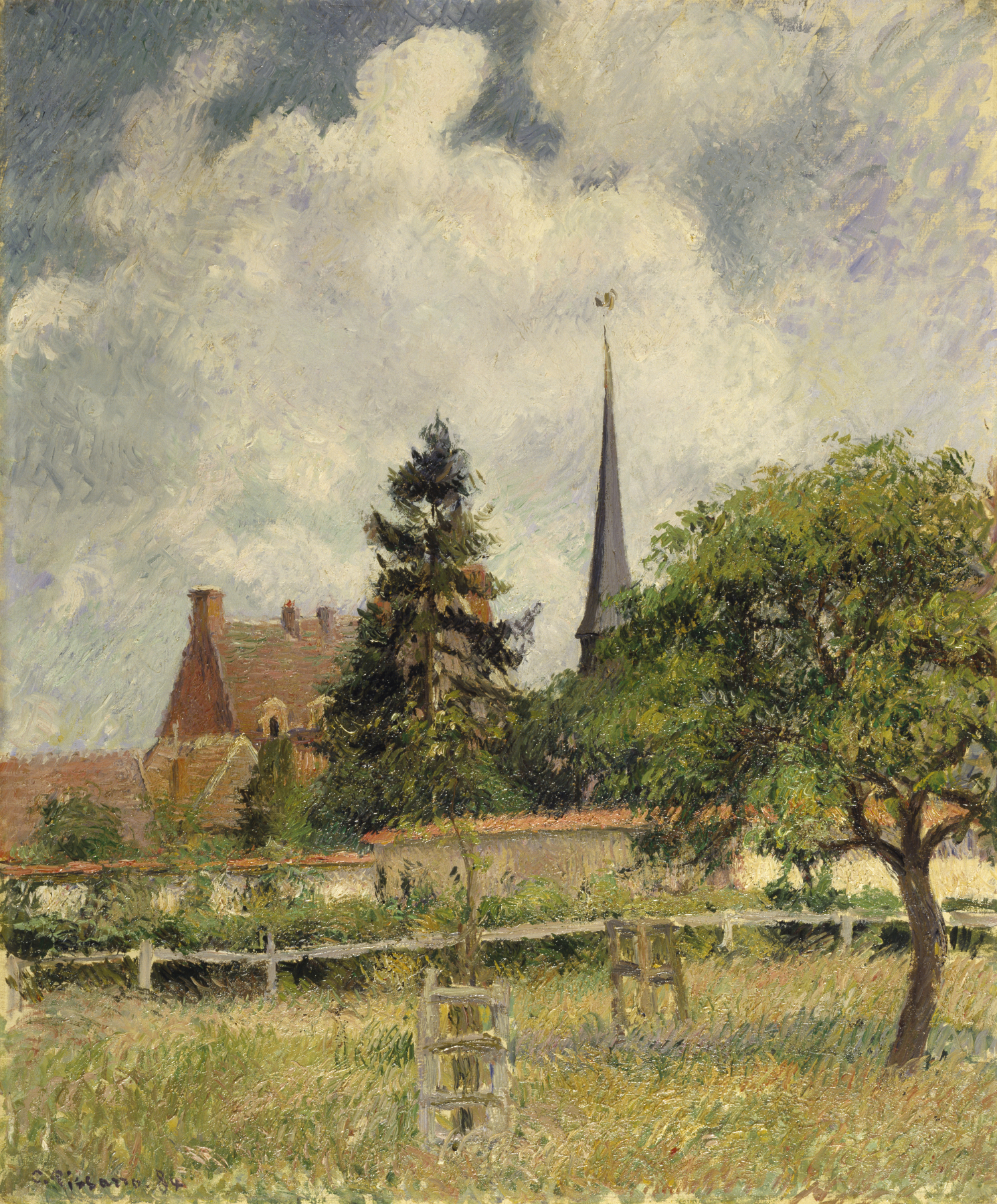
Pissarro, Church at Eragny, 1884 (The Walters Art Museum)

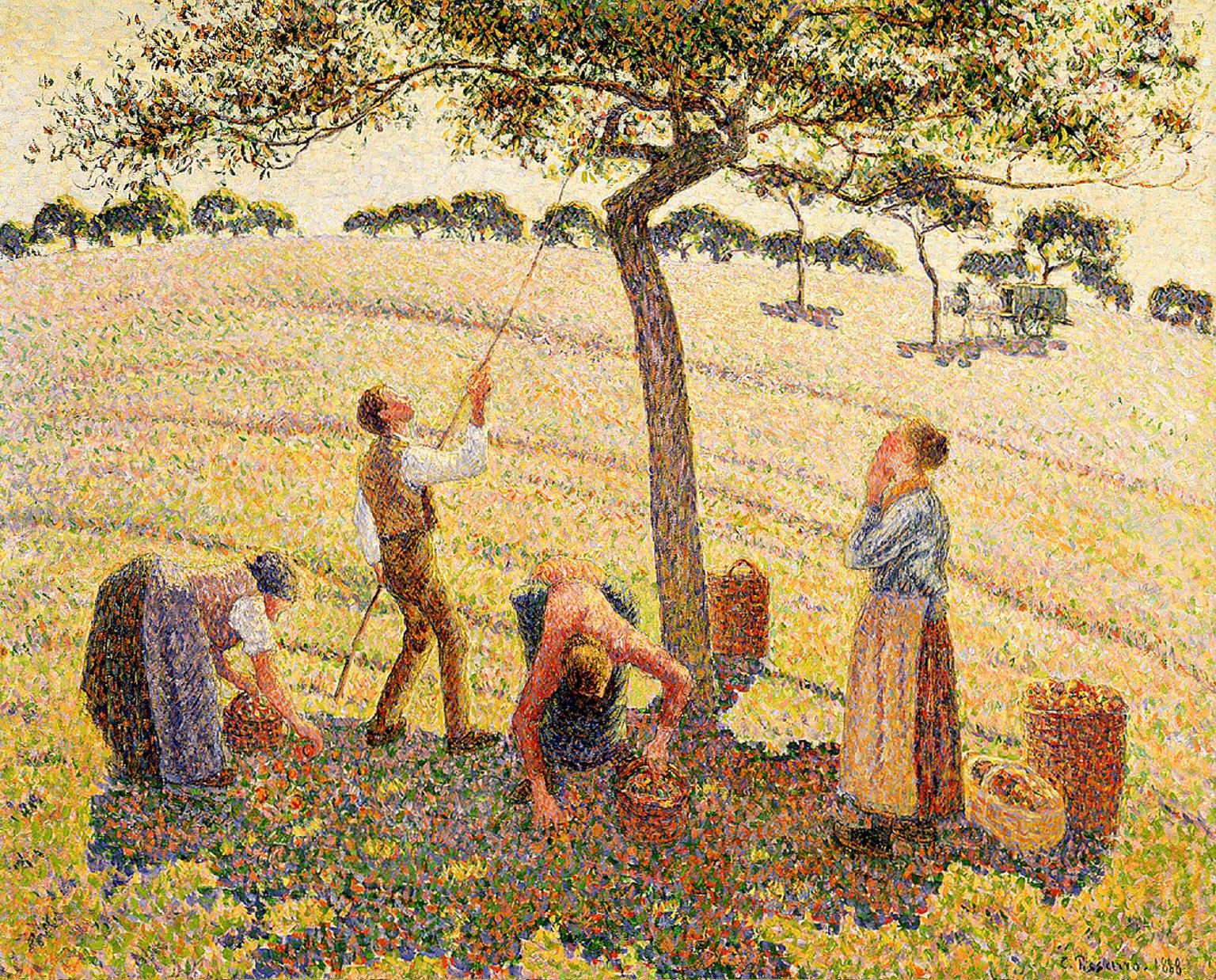
Pissarro, Apple harvest at Éragny, 1888

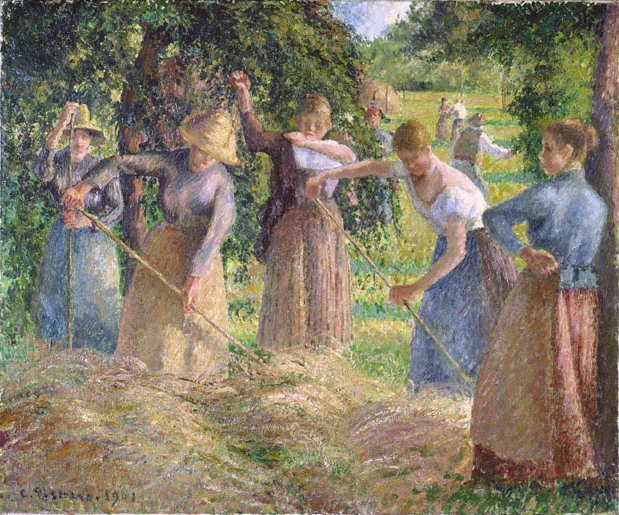
Pissarro, Hay Harvest at Éragny, 1901 (National Gallery of Canada)

== See also ==
- Communes of the Oise department
