= Francisco Pizarro (disambiguation) =

Francisco Pizarro was a 16th-century Spanish conquistador who conquered Peru.

Francisco Pizarro may also refer to:

- Francisco Pizarro (Chilean footballer), Chilean football forward
- Francisco Pizarro (Peruvian footballer), Peruvian football manager and former goalkeeper
- Francisco Pizarro Martínez, Mexican diplomat
- Francisco Pizarro, Nariño, municipality in the Nariño Department, Colombia

== See also ==
- Pizarro (disambiguation)
