= Clécy =

- Commune
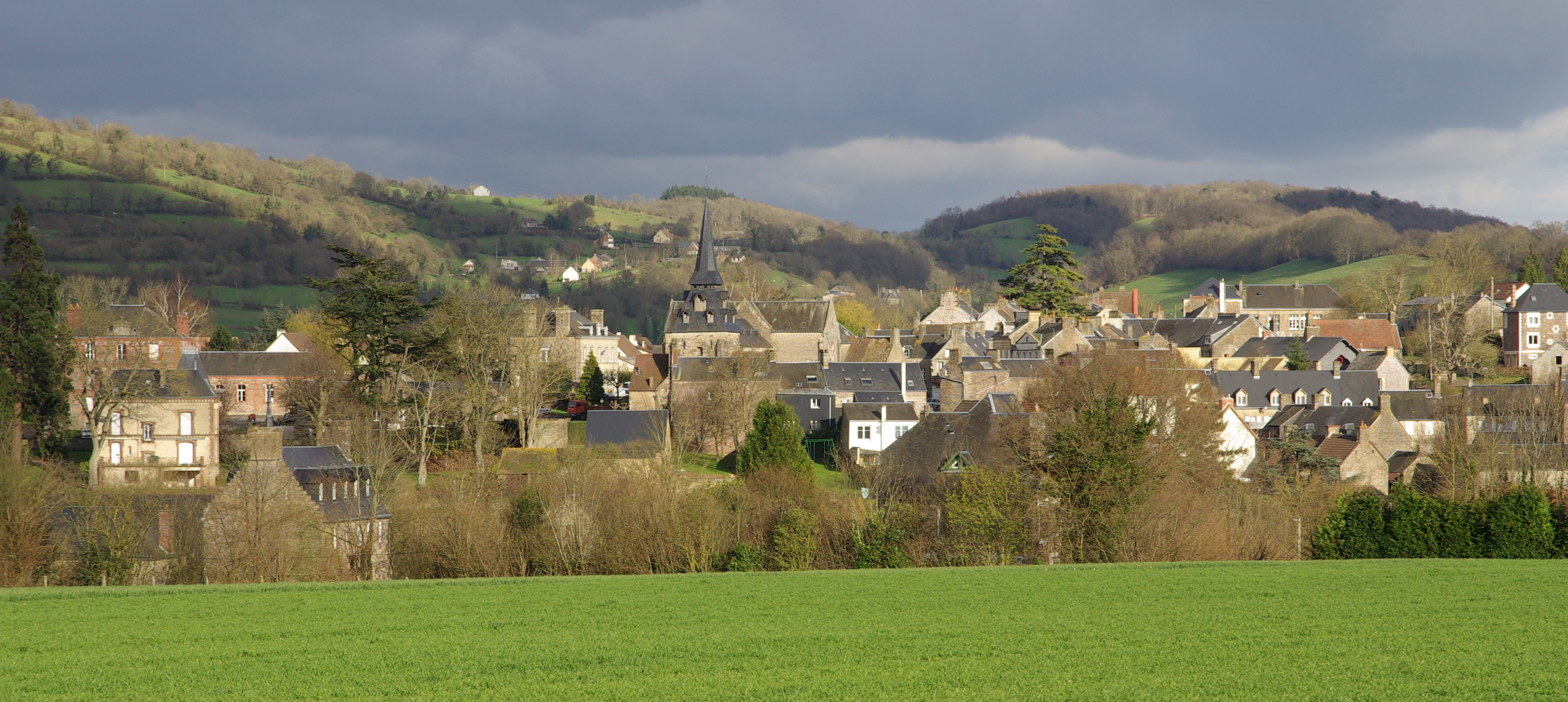
- A general view of Clécy
- Location of Clécy
- Location within France Location within Normandy
- Coordinates: 48°55′01″N 0°28′54″W
- Country: France
- Region: Normandy
- Department: Calvados
- Arrondissement: Caen
- Canton: Le Hom
- Intercommunality: Cingal-Suisse Normande

Government
  - Mayor (2020–2026): Raymond Carville
- Area^{1}: 24.63 km^{2} (9.51 sq mi)
- Elevation: 80 m (260 ft)
- Highest elevation: 261 m (856 ft)
- Lowest elevation: 31 m (102 ft)
- Population (2023): 1,286
  - Density: 52.21/km^{2} (135.2/sq mi)
- Time zone: UTC+01:00 (CET)
  - Summer (DST): UTC+02:00 (CEST)
- INSEE/Postal code: 14162 /14570
- ^{1} French Land Register data, which excludes lakes, ponds, glaciers > 1 km^{2} (0.386 sq mi or 247 acres) and river estuaries.

Clécy (French pronunciation: [klesi]) is a commune in the Calvados department in the Normandy region in northwestern France.

In 1932 it was awarded the title The Capital of Suisse Normande by the Tourism Minister Monsieur Gourdeau.

== Geography ==
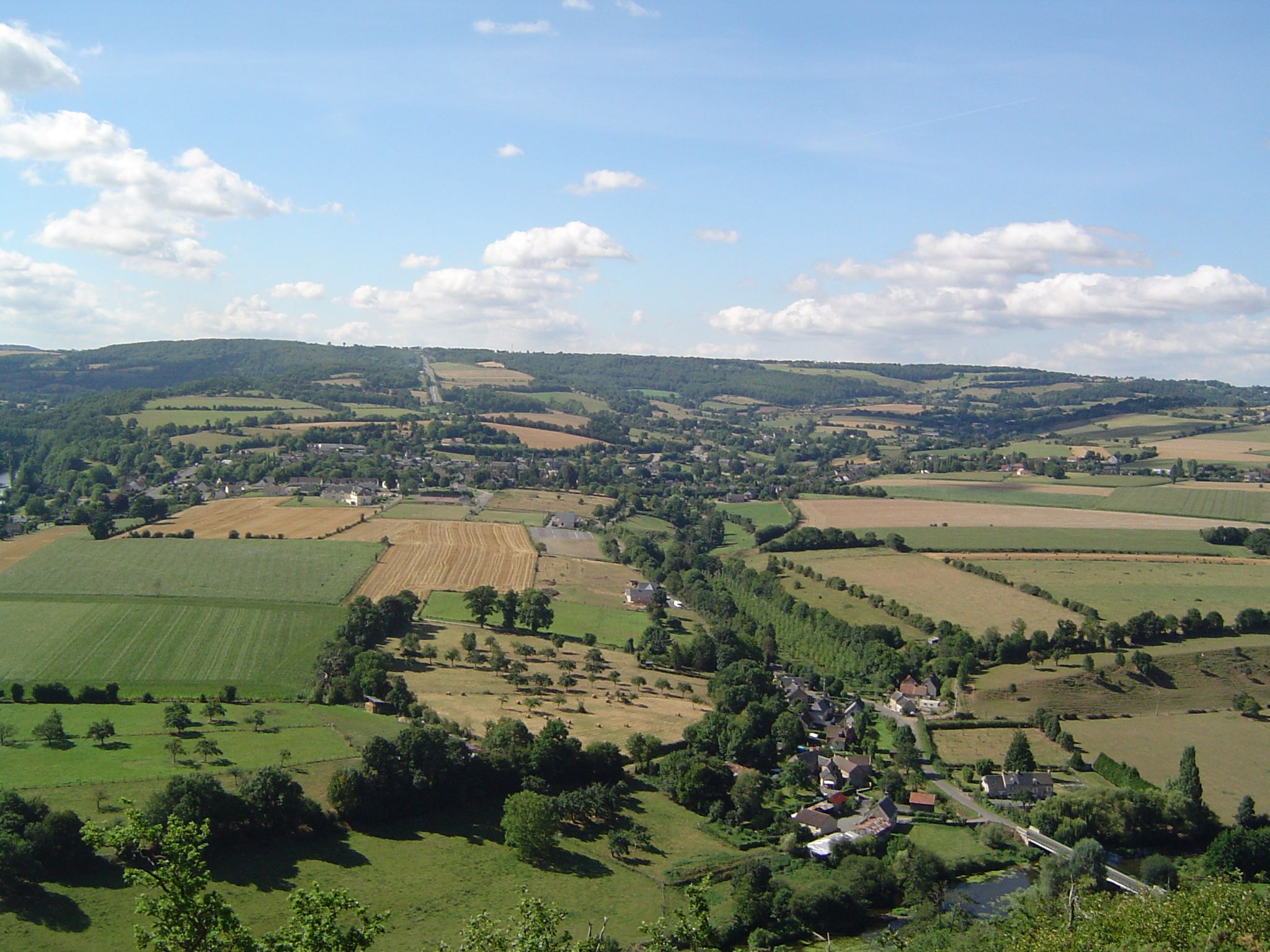
Clécy and its surroundings

Clécy is on the river Orne, in the middle of Norman Switzerland, about 35 kilometres (22 mi)s south of Caen. Covering 2,463 hectares (6,090 acres) it is the second largest commune in the canton of Le Hom.

The Commune consists of the following of villages and hamlets, Roche Taillis, Les Thomas, Le Clos d'Ailly, La Haute Bigne, La Faverie, Les Berthaumes, La Loterie, La Fresnée and Clécy. The commune is spread over an area of 24.63 square kilometres (6,090 acres) with a maximum altitude of 261 metres (856 ft 4 in) and minimum of 31 metres (101 ft 8 in)

Called the "Capital of Norman Switzerland", the village of Clécy owes its fame to the rugged and verdant Armorican massif, with valleys through which the Orne flows. In addition to the Orne, two streams, The Val Fournet and La Porte also flow through the commune.

The Commune with another 20 communes shares part of a 2,115 hectare, Natura 2000 conservation area, called the Vallée de l'Orne et ses affluents.

Plenty of outdoor activities are available: kayaking, paragliding, climbing, hill walking and mountain biking, taking advantage of the geology of Norman Switzerland.

=== Land distribution ===
The 2018 CORINE Land Cover assessment shows the vast majority of the land in the commune, 44% (1,096 hectares (2,710 acres)) is Meadows followed by Heterogeneous agricultural land at 24%. The rest of the land is Forest at 16%, Arable land at 12% and the remaining 3% (63 hectares (160 acres)) is urbanised.

== History ==
The name "Clécy" is mentioned in 860 in the reign of Charles the Bald.

When French cantons were created, Clécy was the capital of the canton. This ceased to be the case after restructuring in 1801.

Clécy has a wealth of historical treasures: Châteaux and manor houses are spread all over Clécy and its surroundings. The Château de la Landelle is one of the oldest.

More recently, painters such as Paul-Émile Pissarro, Moteley and Andre Hardy have painted landscapes around Clécy.

== Administration ==
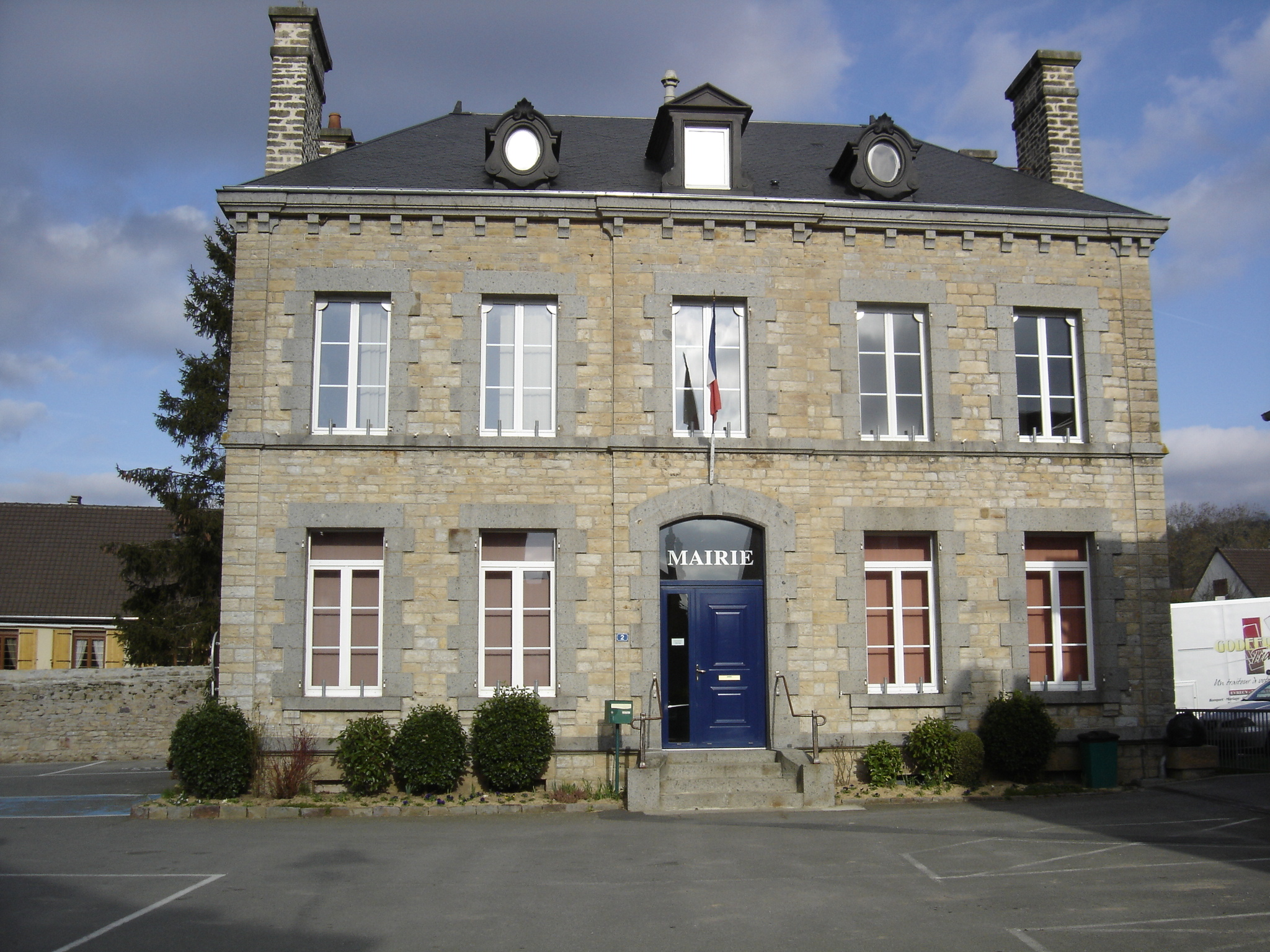
Town hall of Clécy

Election	Mayor	Party	Occupation
1989	Claude Hergault	SE	
2008	Michel Bar	SE	Farmer

== Population ==
Historical population
Year	Pop.	±% p.a.
1968	1,238	—
1975	1,187	−0.60%
1982	1,197	+0.12%
1990	1,182	−0.16%
1999	1,252	+0.64%
2007	1,228	−0.24%
2012	1,254	+0.42%
2017	1,276	+0.35%
2023	1,286	+0.13%
Source: INSEE

Its inhabitants are called Clécyens in French.

== Economy ==
- Fromagerie Vallée (Valley Cheesemaker)

== Sights ==
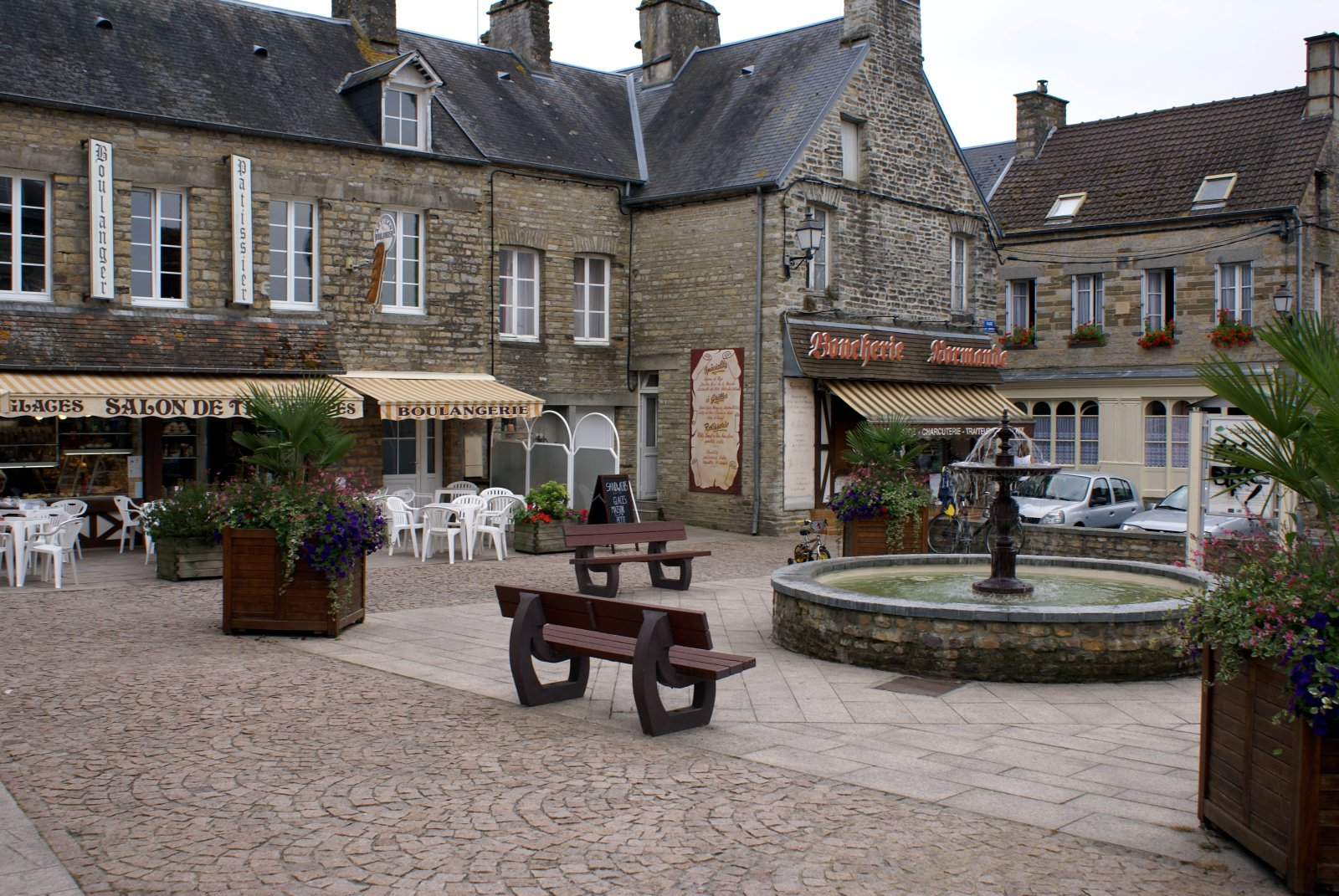
Clécy town centre

- The Château de La Landelle is one of the oldest monuments in the village. At its base it is in the form of a cross, originally on one floor, but was changed to two floors when the wings were reworked. In the Second World War it was occupied by the Germans.
- Musée André Hardy (André Hardy Museum)
- Musée du chemin de fer miniature (Museum of miniature trains)
- Eglise St Pierre (St Paul's church) (15th century)
- Clécy Viaduct (1866)

== Sport ==
The commune has an 18-hole golf course, Golf de Clecy Cantelou.

== Personalities ==
- Paul-Émile Pissarro (1884 – 1972) a French impressionist and neo-impressionist painter, died here.

== Twin towns – sister cities ==
Clécy is twinned with:

- Ermington, United Kingdom since 1980
- Beyne-Heusay, Belgium since 1976

== See also ==
- Communes of the Calvados department
