= All Saints' Church, Hastings (painting) =

Painting by Lucien Pissarro

- Artist: Lucien Pissarro
- Year: 1918
- Type: Oil on canvas, landscape painting
- Dimensions: 64.8 cm × 53 cm (25.5 in × 21 in)
- Location: Tate Britain, London

All Saints' Church, Hastings: Sun and Mist is a 1918 landscape painting by the French-British artist Lucien Pissarro. It depicts All Saints Church in the coastal town of Hastings in East Sussex.

Son of the Impressionist painter Camille Pissarro, the Paris-born Lucien had moved to England in 1890. Before the outbreak of the First World War he was a member of the Camden Town Group. For the final decade of his career he began exhibiting at the Royal Academy of Arts. This painting was displayed at the Royal Academy Exhibition of 1934 held at Burlington House in London. It was acquired for the nation through the Chantrey Bequest, the first time a foreign-born artist had been part of the scheme. It now forms part of the collection of the Tate Britain.

== Bibliography ==
- Meadmore, William Sutton. Lucien Pissarro: Un Coeur Simple. Knopf, 1963.
- Taylor, Brandon. Art for the Nation: Exhibitions and the London Public, 1747-2001. Manchester University Press, 1999.
