= Pizarro (disambiguation) =

Francisco Pizarro (c. 1478–1541) was a Spanish conquistador who led an expedition that conquered the Inca Empire.

Pizarro may also refer to:

== People with the surname ==
- The Pizarro brothers, siblings of Francisco Pizarro who gained fame as Spanish conquistadors
  - Gonzalo Pizarro (1510–1548), co-governor of Peru, led disastrous expedition into the Amazon to find El Dorado
  - Hernando Pizarro (fl. 1508–1578), co-governor of Peru
  - Juan Pizarro (conquistador) (c. 1511 – 1536), half-brother of Francisco, co-governor of Peru, killed during an Inca rebellion
- Gonzalo Pizarro y Rodríguez (1446–1522), Spanish Captain who participated in several campaigns in Italy
- José Alfonso Pizarro, Marquis del Villar (1689–1762), Spanish naval officer and colonial administrator
- Ramón García de León y Pizarro (1745–1815), Spanish military officer and administrator
- Francisco Xavier de Luna Pizarro (1780–1855), Peruvian priest and politician who briefly served as Interim President of Peru twice in 1822 and 1833
- Francisco Pizarro Martínez (1787–1840), Mexican diplomat who served as Envoy Extraordinary and Minister Plenipotentiary of Mexico to the United States
- Gustavo Silva Pizarro (1884—1960), Chilean lawyer, political scientist
- Carlos Muñoz Pizarro (1913–1976), Chilean botanist
- Harold Bedoya Pizarro (1938–2017), general and commander of the Colombian National Army
- Carlos Pizarro Leongómez (1951–1990), the fourth commander of the Colombian guerrilla group 19 April Movement
- Artur Pizarro (born 1968), Portuguese classical pianist
- David Pizarro (born 1979), Chilean football (soccer) player
- Claudio Pizarro (born 1978), Peruvian football (soccer) player
- Federico Pizarro (footballer) (1927–2003), Argentine football player
- Federico Pizarro (handballer) (born 1986), Argentine handball player
- Francisco Pizarro (Chilean footballer) (born 1989), Chilean football (soccer) player
- Francisco Pizarro (Peruvian footballer) (born 1971), Peruvian football (soccer) manager and former player
- Jaime Pizarro (born 1964), Chilean footballer
- Jorge Pizarro Soto (born 1952), Chilean politician
- Juan Pizarro Navarrete (1945–2022), Spanish physician and politician
- Luis Pizarro (boxer) (born 1962), Puerto Rican boxer
- Palmenia Pizarro (born 1941), Chilean singer
- Manuel Pizarro Moreno (born 1951), economist, Spanish jurist, Lawyer of the State, exchange agent and stock exchange
- Rodolfo Pizarro (born 1994), Mexican football (soccer) player
- Rómulo Pizarro (born 1955), Peruvian politician
- Manuel Pizarro (politician) (born 1964), Portuguese politician
- Yolanda Arroyo Pizarro (born 1970), award-winning Puerto Rican novelist, short story writer and essayist
- Rogelio Pizarro (born 1979), Puerto Rican track and field athlete
- Guido Pizarro (born 1990), Argentine football (soccer) player
- Eduardo Pizarro Leongómez, Colombian sociologist and political analyst

In fiction

- Avalo Pizarro, a member of the Blackbeard Pirates in One Piece
- Don Pizarro, the prison governor in Fidelio

== Other uses ==
- Pizarro (play), a 1799 dramatic tragedy by Richard Brinsley Sheridan, based on August von Kotzebue's Die Spanier in Peru
- Pizarro (brigantine), Chilean ship commanded by Francisco Hudson
- ASCOD armoured fighting vehicle family, known in Spain as Pizarro and in Austria as Ulan

== See also ==
- Comet Elst-Pizarro, an astronomical object first reported in 1979
- Pesaro
- Pissarro (surname)
- Bizarro
