= Esther Pissarro =

British artist (1871–1951)

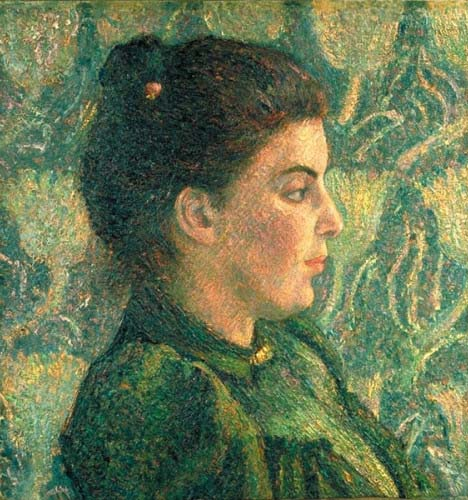
- Portrait of Esther by Lucien Pissarro
- Born: Esther Levi Bensusan; 12 August 1870
- Died: 20 November 1951 (aged 79)
- Known for: Engraving, Printmaking, Design
- Movement: Arts and Crafts movement
- Spouse: Lucien Pissarro (m. 1892; died in 1944)

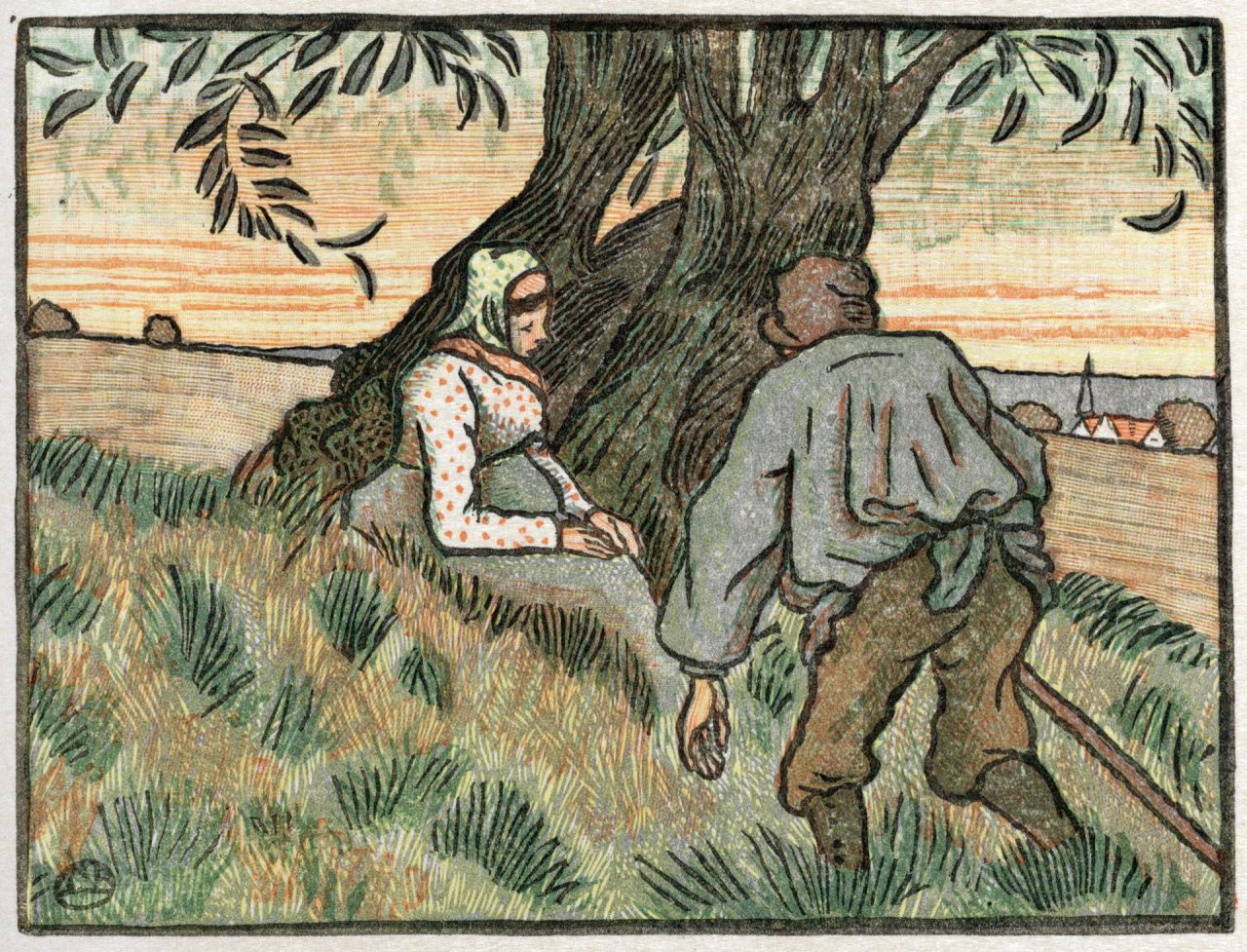
Pastoral scene published by the Eragny Press in London

Esther Bensusan Pissarro (12 November 1870 – 20 November 1951) was a British wood-engraver, designer, and printer.

== Biography ==
Pissarro née Bensusan was born on 12 November 1870, the sister of Samuel L. Bensusan. Her parents were Jacob Samuel Levy Bensusan (1846–1917), an ostrich feather merchant, and his wife Miriam Levy Bensusan (1848–1926). She studied at the Crystal Palace School of Art. On 10 August 1892 she married fellow artist Lucien Pissarro (1863–1944) with whom she had one daughter, the artist Orovida Camille Pissarro (1893–1968). In 1894, inspired by William Morris's Kelmscott Press, Esther and Lucien Pissarro established the Eragny Press. The Eragny Press produced books illustrated with colour wood-engravings. Esther assisted with creating the wood engravings from Lucien's designs.

Pissarro died on 20 November 1951. Work by Esther and Lucien Pissarro are in the Tate and the Royal Academy of Arts.
