= Hugues Claude Pissarro =

French painter (born 1935)

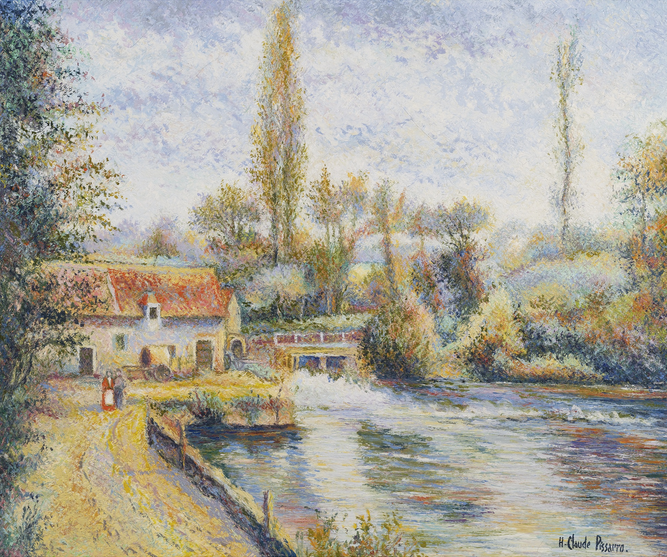
Ferme au bord de l'eau by Pissarro

Hugues Claude Pissarro (born 1935) is a French painter. He is alternately known as Hugues Claude Pissarro, H. Claude Pissarro, and professionally as Isaac Pomié or Hugues Pissarro dit Pomié. His work has been featured in exhibitions in Europe and the United States, and he was commissioned by the White House in 1959 to paint a portrait of U.S. President Dwight Eisenhower.

== Artistic Style ==
Pissarro's work has evolved through a variety of different styles and techniques, from abstract to avant-garde. In 1989, he began a series of contemporary landscapes which were signed "Isaac Pomié" in order to distinguish them from his traditional works. Today, the contemporary paintings are signed "Hugues Pissarro dit Pomié".

== Life and career ==
He is the grandson of Camille Pissarro and son of Paul-Émile Pissarro. He was born in Neuilly-sur-Seine, where he frequently returned with his father on painting excursions. He first exhibited his work at the age of fourteen, and subsequently studied in Paris.

He later became a professor of art and taught for many years in places such as Monaco. He also taught his daughter, Lélia Pissarro, to paint.

== Training ==
- École du Louvre
- École Normale Supérieure
