= Félix Pissarro =

French painter

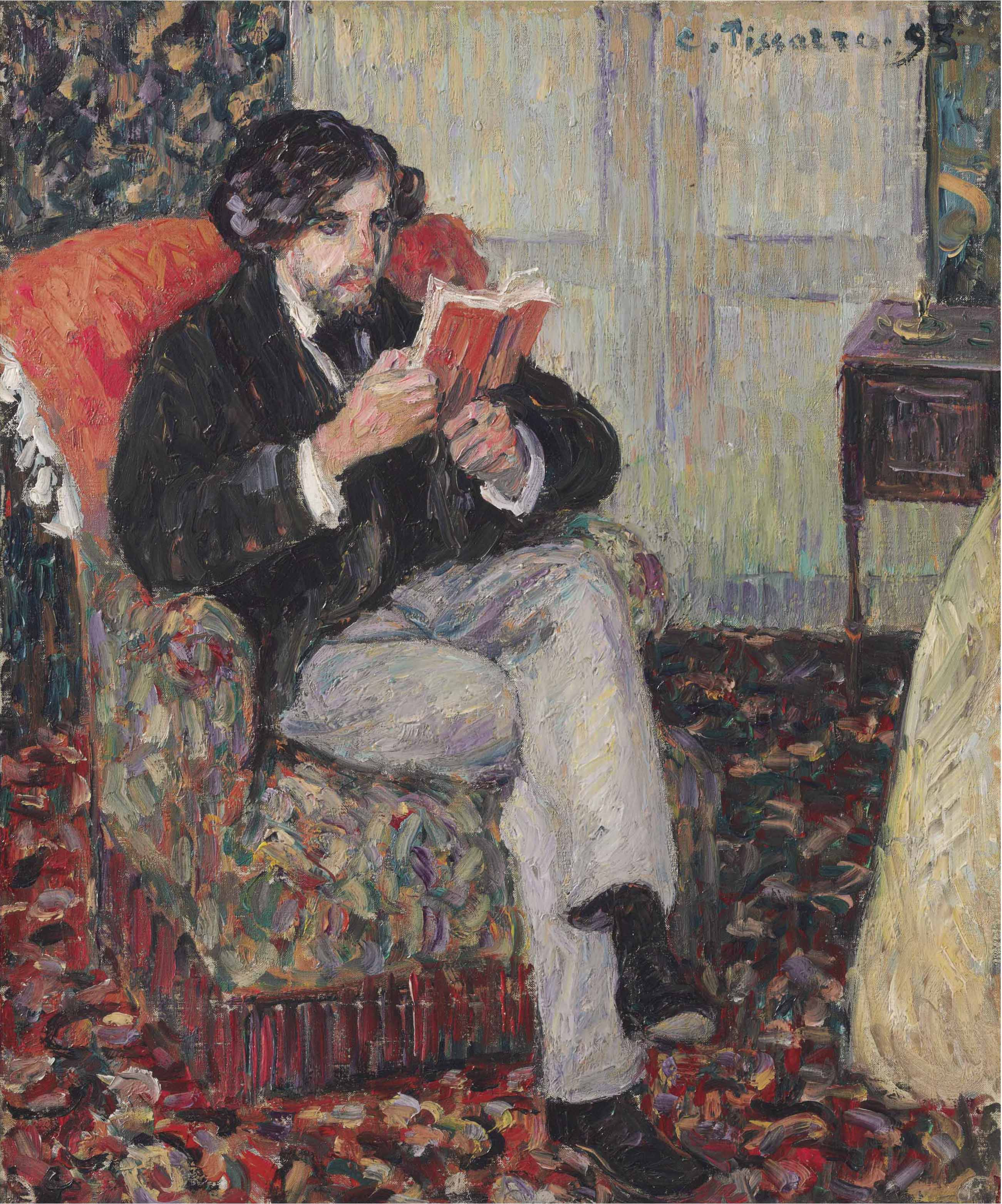
- Félix Pissarro in 1893, painting by his father
- Born: 24 July 1874; Pontoise, France
- Died: 25 November 1897 (aged 23); London
- Resting place: Richmond Cemetery; 51.4558°N 0.2877°W
- Occupation: Painter

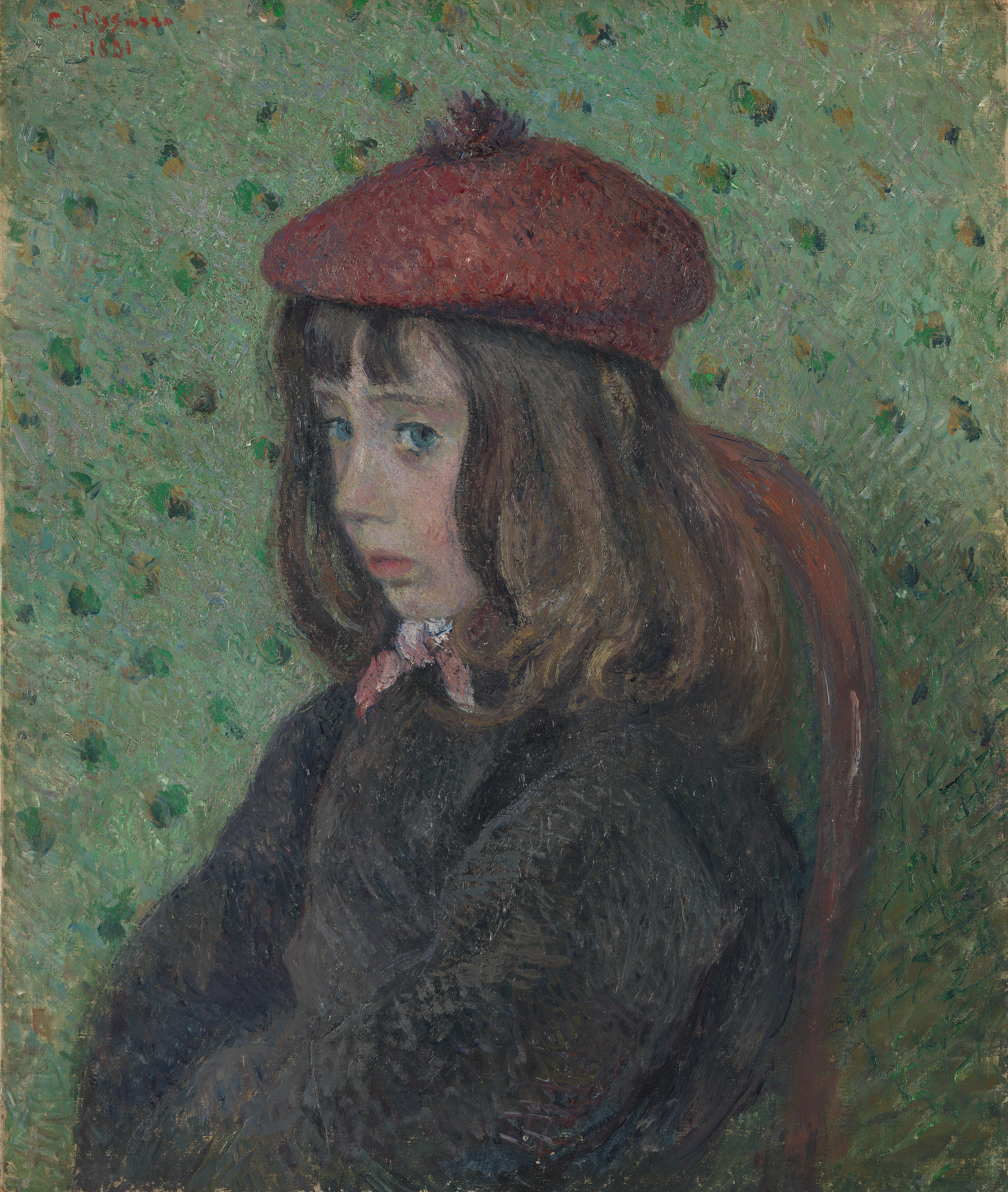
Félix at the age of seven, as portraited in 1881 by his father Camille Pissarro.

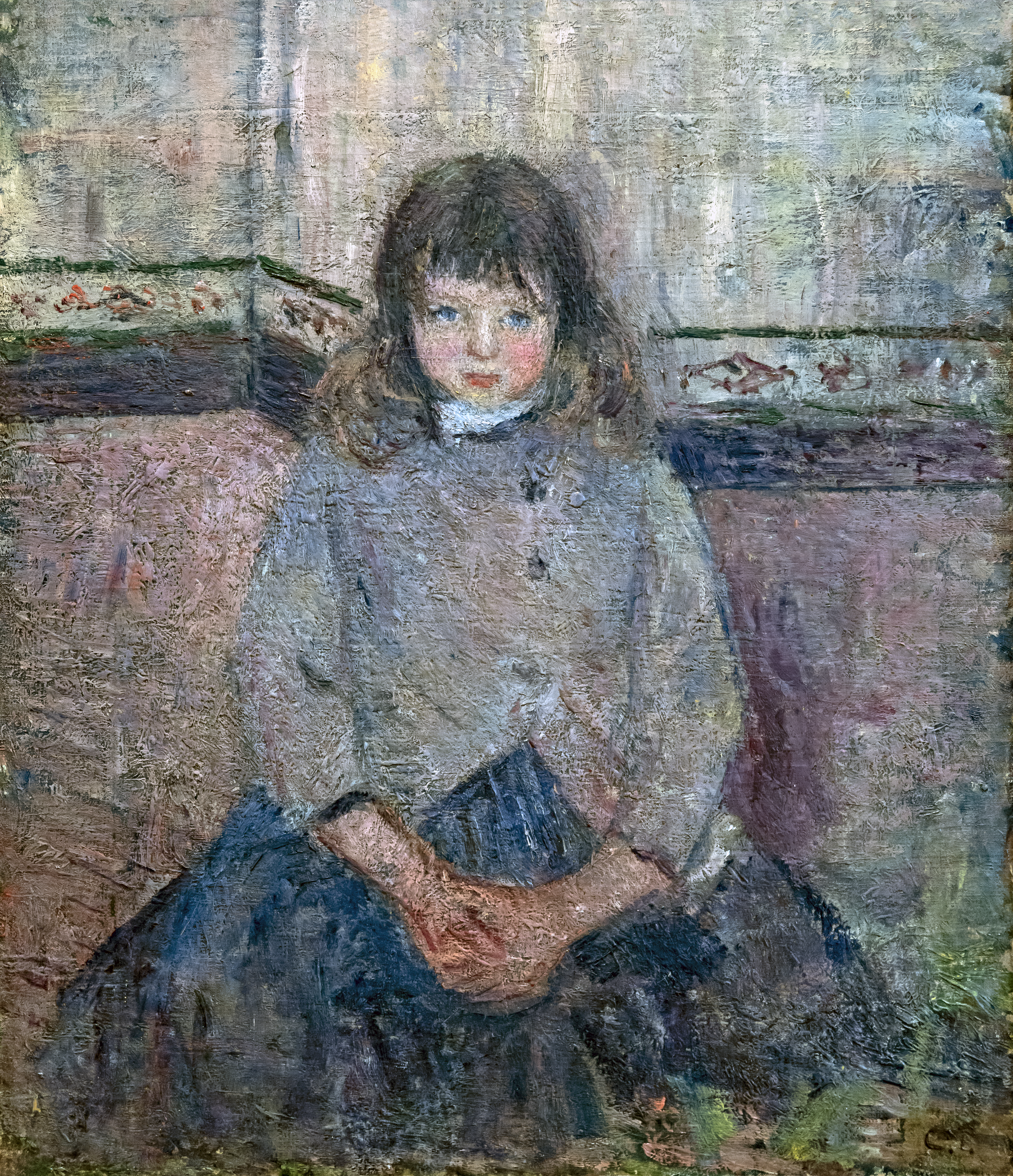
Félix en jupe by Camille Pissarro, 1883

Félix Pissarro (also known by the pseudonym Jean Roch; 24 July 1874 – 29 November 1897) was a nineteenth-century French painter, etcher and caricaturist of Portuguese-Jewish descent. Known as Titi in his family circle, he was the third son of the painter Camille and Julie Pissarro.

== Life ==
He was born in Pontoise, Paris, in the year of the First Impressionist Exhibition. Like his siblings Lucien and Georges, he spent his formative years surrounded by his father's fellow artists such as Claude Monet and Pierre-Auguste Renoir who frequented the Pissarro home. Félix's works very early demonstrated great strength and originality. His father regarded him as the most promising of his sons but before he was able to realise his full potential, he contracted tuberculosis and died in a sanatorium at 262 Kew Road, Kew (which is now in the London Borough of Richmond upon Thames), at the age of 23. He is buried in Richmond Cemetery.
