= Joachim Pissarro =

French art historian, theoretician and curator

Joachim Pissarro (born 1959) is an art historian, theoretician, curator, educator, and director of the Hunter College Galleries and Bershad Professor of Art History at Hunter College of the City University of New York. His latest book, authored with art critic David Carrier, is called Wild Art. Pissarro was curator at the Museum of Modern Art's Department of Painting and Sculpture from 2003 to 2007.

== Early life and education ==
Pissarro was born in Caen, Calvados, Normandy. He is the great-grandson of impressionist painter Camille Pissarro. He spent much of his childhood in Suisse Normande with his grandparents surrounded by art and artists. Pissarro studied philosophy at the Sorbonne and graduated with a M.A. from the Courtauld Institute of Art in London. In 2001, he received his PhD from the University of Texas at Austin in History of Art. Pissarro's dissertation was entitled: "Individualism and inter-subjectivity in modernism: two case studies of artistic interchanges. Camille Pissarro (1830–1903) and Paul Cézanne (1839–1906) : Robert Rauschenberg (1925–2008) and Jasper Johns (1930– )".

== Career ==
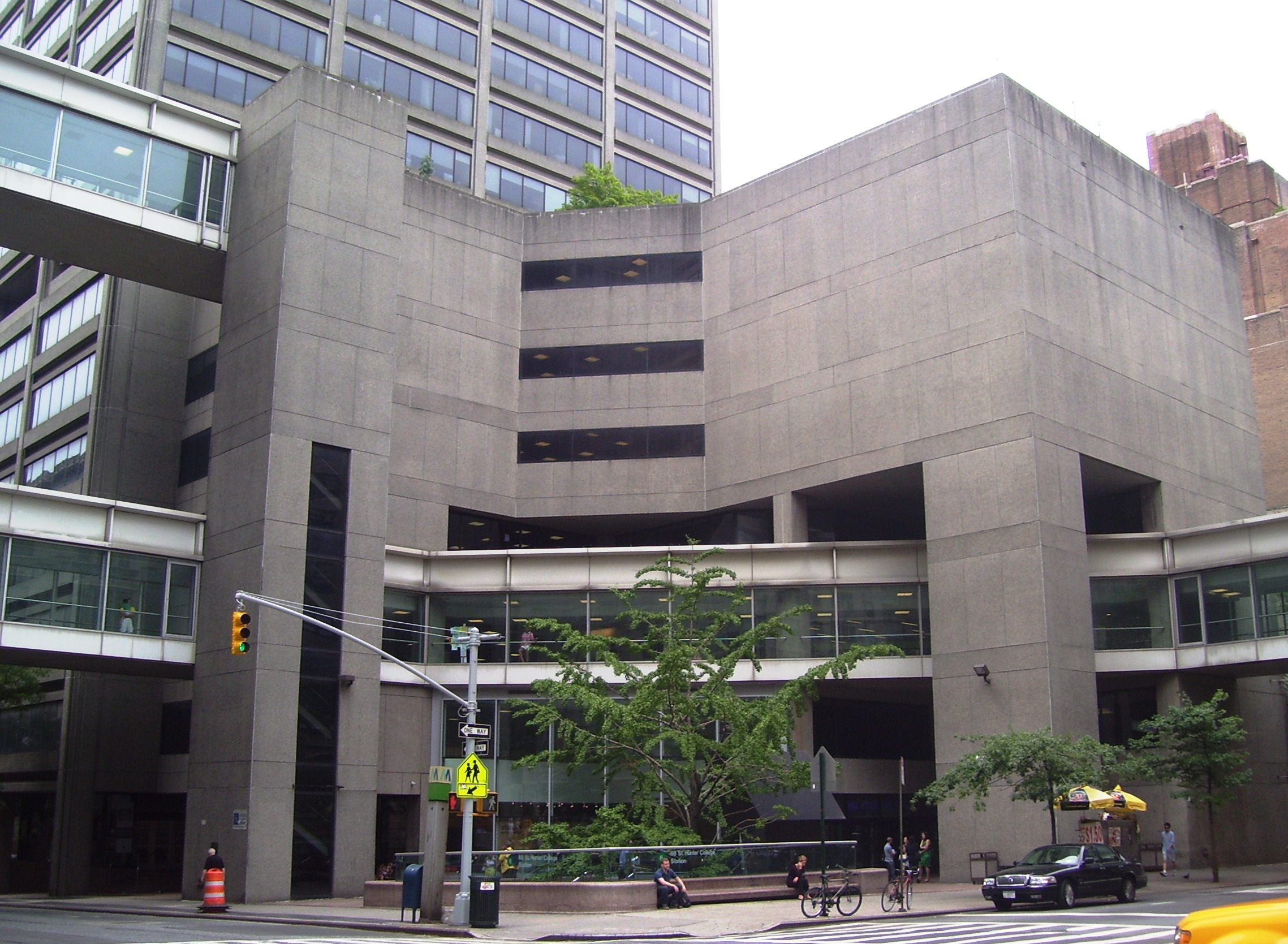
Pissarro studied at Hunter College: here, West (background) and East Buildings

In 1983, Pissarro began working on the Catalogue Raisonné of Camille Pissarro under John Rewald. In 1984, Pissarro was the director of Impressionist modern paintings and sculptures for Phillips Auction House in London. He founded the department of modern Impressionist painting in the department of New York.

Between receiving his master's and his PhD, Pissarro began his teaching career as a visiting lecturer at the University of Texas at Austin. During this time, he also started his career as a curator, being an independent curator at institutions such as the Dallas Museum of Art, the Philadelphia Museum of Art, and the Royal Academy, London. In 1994, Pissarro was named chief curator of the Kimbell Art Museum in Fort Worth, Texas. In 2000, Pissarro began working in New York City as a member of the Advisory Committee on Archives, Library, and Research at the Museum of Modern Art. In 2003, he became curator of the MoMA’s Painting and Sculpture department. He has been an adjunct curator at the MoMA since 2007. Based in New York City for most of his career, Pissarro’s reputation as a highly esteemed art historian has allowed him to work with artists all over the world, contemporary and classical. He continues to work as an independent curator and research consultant. In 2023, Pissarro was named the cultural attache of France’s Normandy region.

== Teaching ==
Pissarro has a teaching career that spans over 35 years, and one that has taken him all over the globe. He has taught History of Art at Yeshiva University; University of Texas (Austin); Queensland Art Gallery in Brisbane, Australia; Melbourne University; and Yale University. He also regularly travels the world to speak and lecture at various Art institutions. Since 2002, Pissarro has been a professor at Hunter College in New York City, where he was a Bershad Professor of Art History, and director of the Hunter College Art Galleries until 2022. He continues to serve as a thesis advisor.

In 1999 he worked as a visiting lecturer at Sydney University and Melbourne University and ran a seminar on the Asia-Pacific Triennial at the Brisbane Art Gallery.

From 1997 to 2000, Pissarro served as the Seymour H. Knox Jr. Curator of European and Contemporary Art at the Yale University Art Gallery and was adjunct professor in the Department of the History of Art. Exhibits curated while at Yale include Jasper Johns Recent Paintings (with Richard Field and Gary Garrels, 2000); After looking at Chinese Rocks: Brice Marden: Work in Progress (1999); and Post-Modern Transgressions (1999).

== Curatorial career ==
Pissarro has had an extensive career as a curator. He has worked for both internationally acclaimed museums and as a self-employed research consultant. He frequently works with contemporary artists, but also draws much inspiration from impressionist artists such as Cezanne, Van Gogh, Monet, and his great-grandfather.

From 1988 to 1993, he was an independent curator with the Dallas Museum of Art, the Philadelphia Museum of Art, and Royal Academy of London. Pissarro served as Chief Curator at the Kimbell Art Museum in Fort Worth, TX from 1994 to 1997. While at the Kimbell, Pissarro curated Matisse and Picasso: A Gentle Rivalry with Yve-Alain Bois.

In 1999 he worked as a visiting lecturer at Sydney University and Melbourne University and ran a seminar on the Asia-Pacific Triennial at the Brisbane Art Gallery.

From 1997 to 2000, Pissarro served as the Seymour H. Knox Jr. Curator of European and Contemporary Art at the Yale University Art Gallery and was adjunct professor in the Department of the History of Art. Exhibits curated while at Yale include Jasper Johns Recent Paintings (with Richard Field and Gary Garrels, 2000); After looking at Chinese Rocks: Brice Marden: Work in Progress (1999); and Post-Modern Transgressions (1999).

Pissarro supervised the first reinstallation of the modern and contemporary collection at the Yale University Art Gallery and focused on the recent history of the Yale School of Art, leading to an exhibition entitled Then and Now and Later (co-curated with Thomas Crow, 1998). The exhibit featured the art of Yale alumni including Dawoud Bey, Gregory Crewdson, John Currin, Ann Hamilton, Roni Horn, Abelardo Morell, Jessica Stockholder, Peter Wegner, and Lisa Yuskavage.

From 2003 to 2007 he served as a curator in painting and sculpture for the Museum of Modern Art in New York City. Notable exhibitions Pissarro curated include Pioneering Modern Painting: Cézanne and Pissarro 1865–1885 (2005) and Out of Time: A Contemporary View (2006, with Eva Respini).

A number of Pissarro's exhibitions have toured nationally and worldwide such as:

- Monet and the Mediterranean (1997–98); shown at the Kimbell Art Museum and Brooklyn Museum;
- Georges de La Tour (1996–97), co-organized with the National Gallery of Art, Washington, D.C., in collaboration with Philip Conisbee, and shown at the Kimbell Art Museum and the National Gallery;
- The Impressionist and the City: Pissarro's Series (1992–93); shown at the Dallas Museum of Art, the Philadelphia Museum of Art, and the Royal Academy of Arts, London.

== Personal life ==
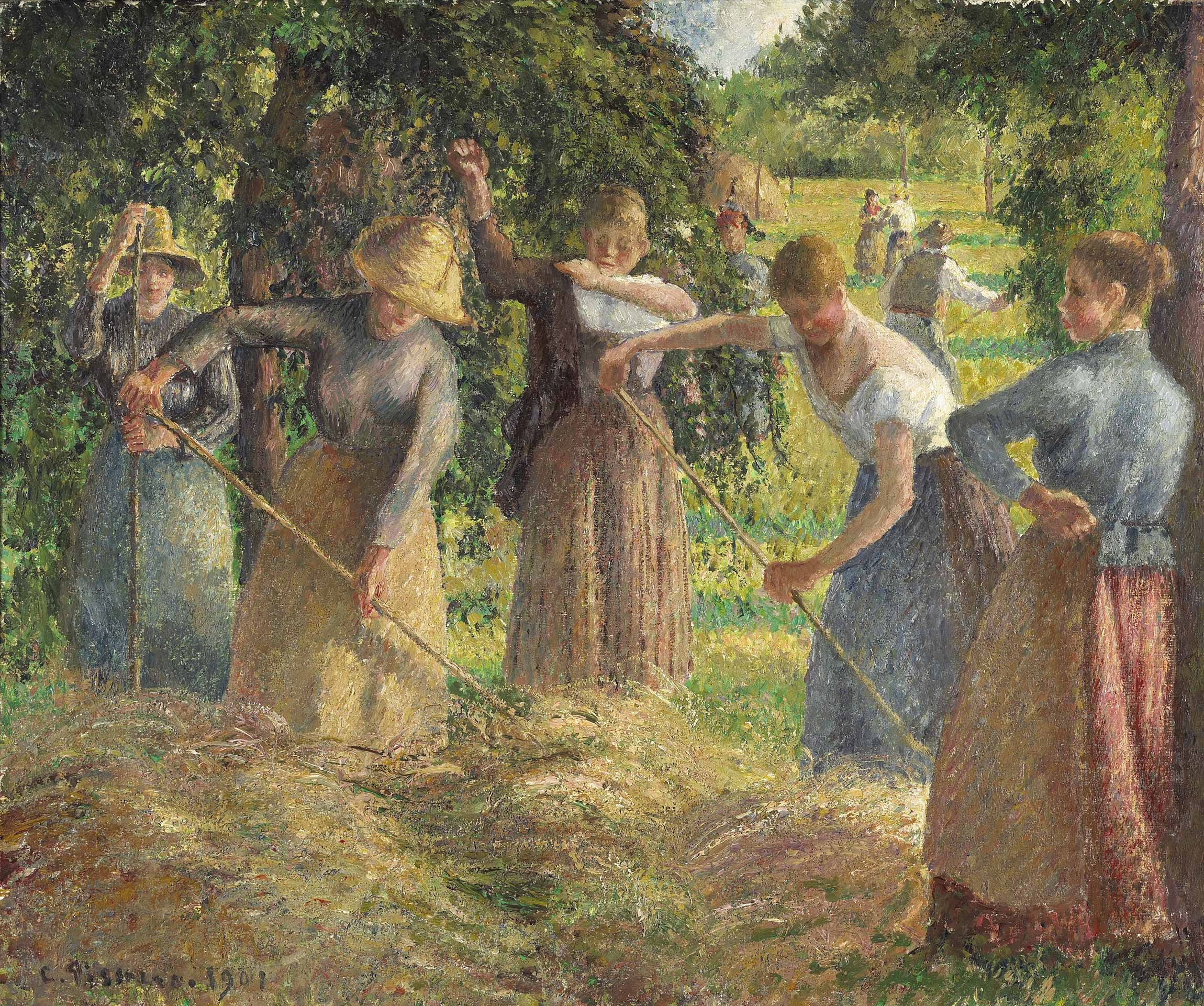
Hay Harvest at Éragny (1901) by Camille Pissarro (National Gallery of Canada, Ottawa)

Pissarro is the great grandson of Camille Pissarro, a key painter in the Impressionist movement and the only artist to have his work shown at all eight Paris Impressionist exhibitions. Camille Pissarro was a mentor to artists such as Georges Seurat, Paul Cézanne, Vincent van Gogh, and Paul Gauguin.

== Works ==
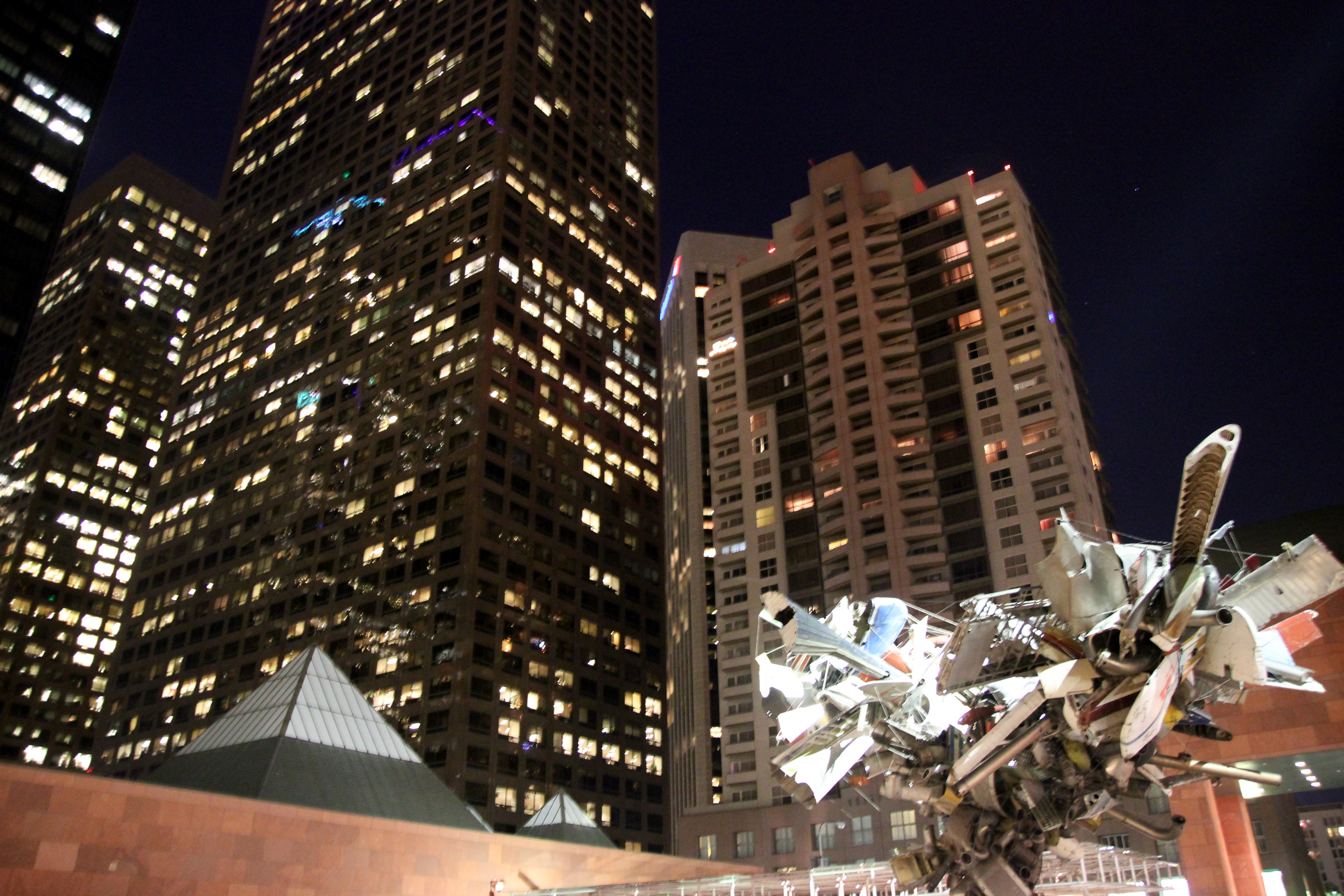
MOCA inspired Pissarro — here, downtown buildings and Mark Thompson's Airplane Parts sculpture

=== Wild Art ===
Pissarro and art critic David Carrier—both with a background in philosophy—co-authored a book called Wild Art (Phaidon Press), which released October 14, 2013.

The book features 10 chapters of about 50 works each showcasing alternative art genres such as street art, food art, minuscule art, ice, and sand sculptures. Carrier and Pissarro explore artwork that has notoriety outside the world of high art and, according to Huck Magazine, argue "for recognition of artwork that is made and displayed far from the beaten track."

Pissarro and Carrier were partly inspired by the exhibition Art in the Streets (2011) at Museum of Contemporary Art, Los Angeles, which was the first time a major art museum in America curated street art and graffiti. They coined the term "wild art" to mean the world of art beyond the established art world. Wild art is the equivalent of what we call wild versus domesticated animals or plants.

=== Select bibliography ===
- "Monet / Pissarro in the 1890s : Serial Racing", in Pissarro, Museo Thyssen-Bornemisza, Madrid, 2013
- "Jeff Koons's Antiquity Series—A Reflection on Acceptance", in Jeff Koons : The Painter, an exhibition co-curated by Pissarro, at the Schirn Kunsthalle, Frankfurt, summer 2012
- "Jeff Koons at Almine Rech", "Joachim Pissarro in conversation with Jeff Koons", and "Jeff Koons: Humankind Before All", Jeff Koons, Almine Rech Gallery, Brussels, 2012
- "Cézanne et Pissarro: Esthétiques de la Résistance / Résistances à toute Esthétique", Cézanne et Paris, Musée du Luxembourg, Paris, 2011
- "The Love of Painting" (with Mara Hoberman), Robert Indiana: Rare Works from 1959 on Coenties Slip, Galerie Gmurzynska, Zurich, 2011
- "A Sea of Meanings: Drawings by Robert Morris", Robert Morris: Drawings 1961, Craig F. Starr Gallery, New York, 2011
- "Reality Show," (with Mara Hoberman), Marc Quinn: Allanah, Buck, Catman, Chelsea, Michael, Pamela and Thomas, White Cube, London, 2010
- "Joseph Beuys: Set Between One and All", Joseph Beuys: Make the Secrets Productive, PaceWildenstein, New York, 2010
- "A conversation: Tim Eitel and Joachim Pissarro", Tim Eitel, Invisible Forces, PaceWildenstein, New York, 2010
- "Le de Kooning tardif" in Deadline, Musée d'Art moderne de la Ville, Paris-Musées, Paris, 2009
- Representing Limitlessness: Rachel Howard's Via Dolorosa: Truth is Repetition," in Rachel Howard, Repetition is Truth – Via Dolorosa, Murderme Publications, London, 2009
- Vincent van Gogh: the Colors of the Night, with Sjraar van Heugten and Chris Stolwick, co-published by The Museum of Modern Art, New York, and the Van Gogh Museum, Amsterdam, 2008
- "The Night's Thousand Eyes", to: Night: Contemporary Representations of the Night, Hunter College Art Galleries, New York, 2008
- "Late de Kooning" Willem de Kooning 1981–1986, published by L&M Arts, New York, 2007
- Cézanne/Pissarro, Johns/Rauschenberg; Comparative Studies on Intersubjectivity in Modern Art, Cambridge University Press, Cambridge and New York, 2006
- Critical Catalogue of Camille Pissarro's Paintings, Wildenstein Institute, Paris, 2005. (3 volumes) (with Claire Snollaerts)
- Pioneering Modern Painting: Cézanne and Pissarro, The Museum of Modern Art, New York, 2005
- The Thannhauser Collection of the Guggenheim Museum, The Guggenheim Museum, New York, 2001. (with other authors)
- "Jasper Johns's Bridge Paintings Under Construction," in Jasper Johns—New Paintings and Works on Paper, San Francisco Museum of Modern Art, in association with the Yale University Art Gallery, New Haven, 1999
- Introductory essay to Matisse and Picasso, by Yve-Alain Bois, Flammarion, Paris, 1998
- "Robert Indiana: Signs into Art", in Robert Indiana—Rétrospective 1958–1998, Musée d'art moderne etd'art contemporain, Nice, 1998
- Then and Now and Later: Art Since 1945 at Yale, Yale University Art Gallery, New Haven, 1998
- Monet and the Mediterranean, Rizzoli, New York, 1997
- "La Main de Giacometti", La Main, Institut d'Arts Visuels, Association des Conférences, Orléans, 1996
- "Pissarro in St. Thomas," in Camille Pissarro in the Caribbean, 1850–1855: Drawings from the Collection at Olana, The Hebrew Congregation of St. Thomas, St. Thomas, U.S. Virgin Islands, 1996
- "Pissarro's Memory," in Camille Pissarro: Impressionist Innovator, The Israel Museum, Jerusalem, 1994
- Camille Pissarro, Abrams, New York, 1993
- The Impressionist and the City: Pissarro's Series Paintings, Yale University Press, New Haven and London, 1992. (with Richard Brettell)
- Camille Pissarro, Rizzoli Art Series, New York, 1992
- "Y a-t-il une mélancolie impressionniste?" in Esthétique et mélancolie, Institut d'Arts Visuels, Association des Conférences, Orléans, 1992
- Catalogue for The Sirak Collection, Columbus Museum of Art, Columbus, Ohio, 1991. (with Richard Brettell)
- Monet's Cathedral, Rouen, 1892–1894, A. Knopf, New York, 1990
