= Lucien Pissarro =

French painter and printmaker (1863–1944)

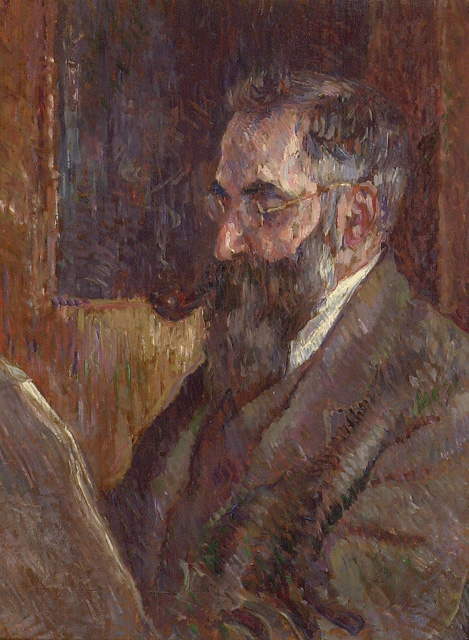
- Lucien Pissarro Reading, by J.B. Manson c. 1913
- Born: 20 February 1863; Paris, French Second Empire
- Died: 10 July 1944 (aged 81); Hewood, Dorset, England
- Known for: Landscape painting, printmaking, wood engraving
- Movement: Impressionism; Neo-Impressionism
- Spouse: Esther Levi Bensusan (m. 1892)

Lucien Pissarro (20 February 1863 – 10 July 1944) was a French landscape painter, printmaker, wood engraver, designer, and printer of fine books. His landscape paintings employ techniques of Impressionism and Neo-Impressionism, but he also exhibited with Les XX. Apart from his landscapes, he painted a few still lifes and family portraits. Until 1890 he worked in France, but thereafter was based in Great Britain. He was the eldest son of the French Impressionist painter Camille Pissarro and his wife Julie (née Vellay).

== Biography ==
Pissarro was born on 20 February 1863 in Paris, French Third Republic. He was the oldest of seven children; the son of French Impressionist painter Camille Pissarro and his wife Julie (née Vellay). His grandfather on his father's side was of Portuguese Jewish descent and his grandmother was from a French-Jewish family from St. Thomas with Provençal Jewish roots. He studied with his father and—like his siblings Georges and Félix—he spent his formative years surrounded by his father's fellow artists, such as Claude Monet and Pierre-Auguste Renoir, who frequented the Pissarro home. He was influenced by Georges Seurat and Paul Signac.

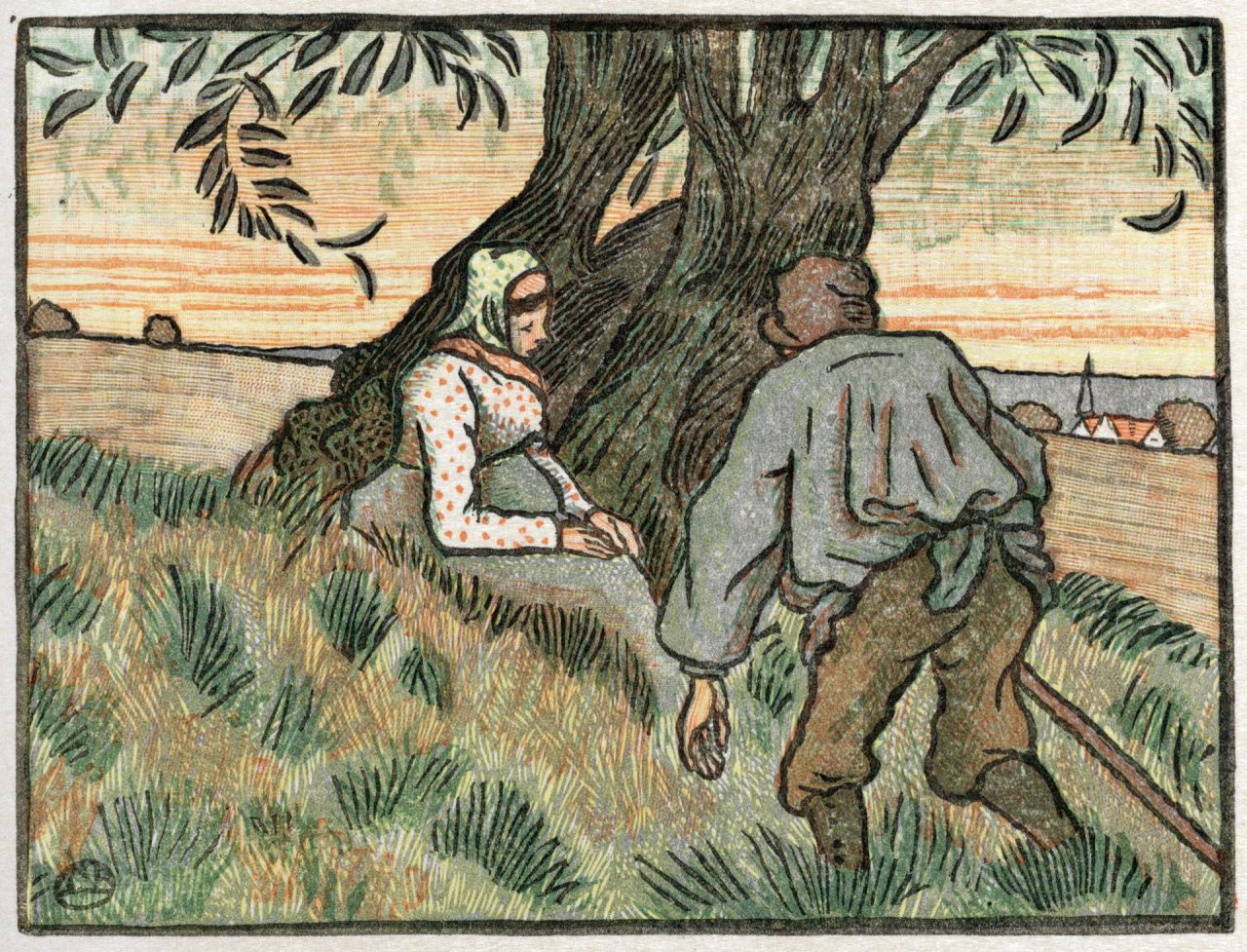
Lucien Pissarro, Pastoral scene, 1901

He first visited Great Britain in 1870–71, during the Franco-Prussian War. He returned in 1883–84, and in 1890 settled permanently in London. In 1886, he exhibited at the last of the Impressionist exhibitions. From 1886 to 1894, he exhibited with the Salon des Independents. On 10 August 1892, he married Esther Levi Bensusan in Richmond. While renting a cottage at Epping, Essex on 8 October 1893, their daughter and only child, Orovida Camille Pissarro, was born. Orovida also became an artist. He met Charles Ricketts and Charles Shannon, and contributed woodcuts to their Dial. In 1894, he founded the Eragny Press and with his wife and illustrated and printed books until the press was closed in 1914. In 1897, the family moved to 62 Bath Road in Stamford Brook, Chiswick. In 1903, he designed the typeface Brook Type.

Pissarro associated with Walter Sickert in Fitzroy Street, and in 1906 became a member of the New English Art Club. From 1913 to 1919, he painted landscapes of Dorset, Westmorland, Devon, Essex, Surrey and Sussex.

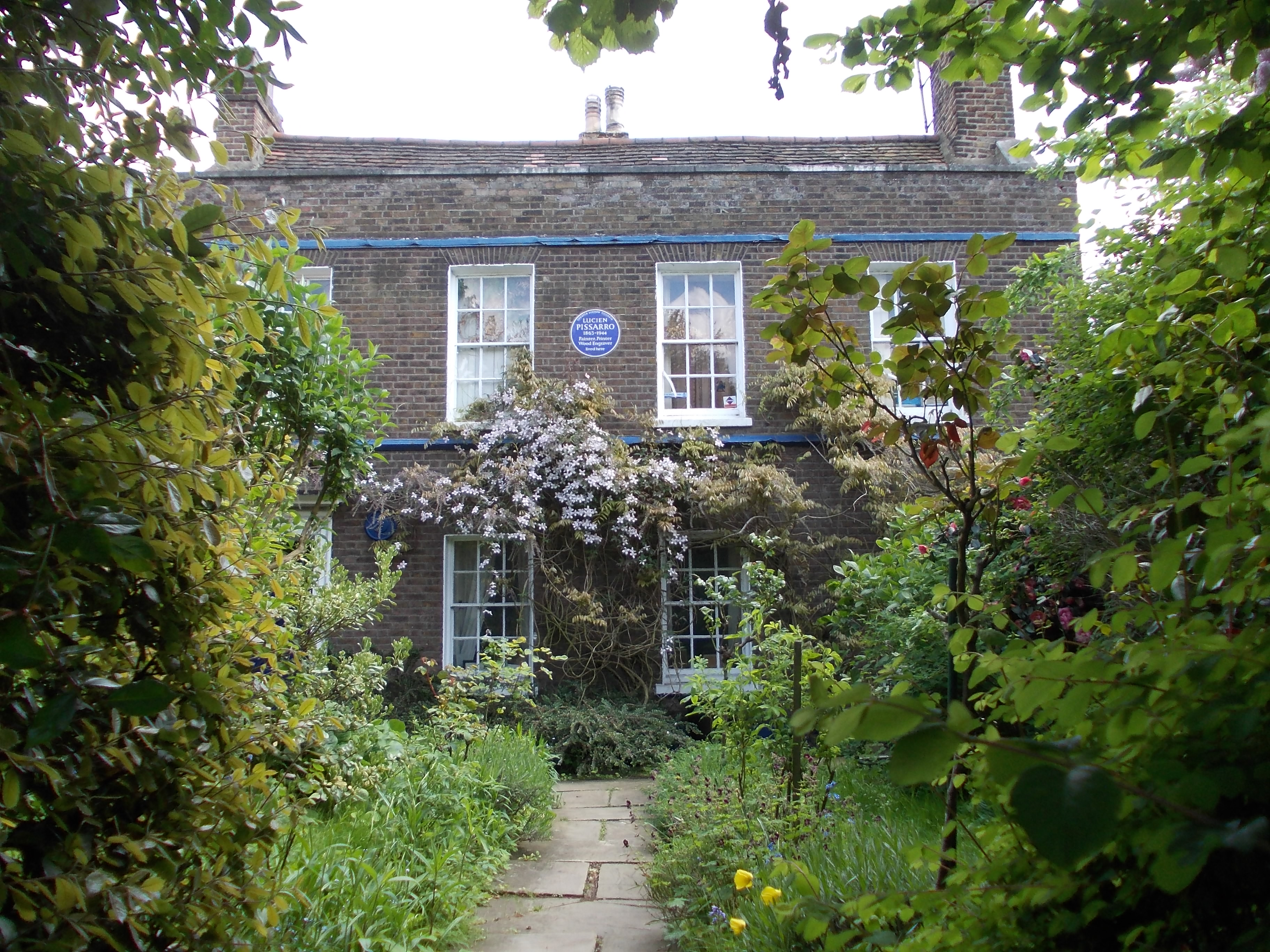
Lucien Pissarro's house in Stamford Brook, London, with a blue plaque bearing the following inscription: "Lucien Pissarro 1863–1944 Painter, Printer, Wood Engraver lived here".

In 1916, Pissarro became a British subject. While in Britain he was one of the founders of the Camden Town Group of artists. In 1919, he formed the Monarro Group with J.B. Manson as the London Secretary and Théo van Rysselberghe as the Paris secretary, aiming to show artists inspired by Impressionist painters, Claude Monet and Camille Pissarro. The group ceased three years later.

From 1922 to 1937, he painted regularly in the south of France, interspersed with painting expeditions to Derbyshire, south Wales and Essex. From 1934 to 1944, he exhibited at the Royal Academy in London. He died on 10 July 1944, in the hamlet of Hewood, part of Thorncombe parish, West Dorset.

All Saints' Church, Hastings, 1918
