= Georges Henri Manzana Pissarro =

French painter

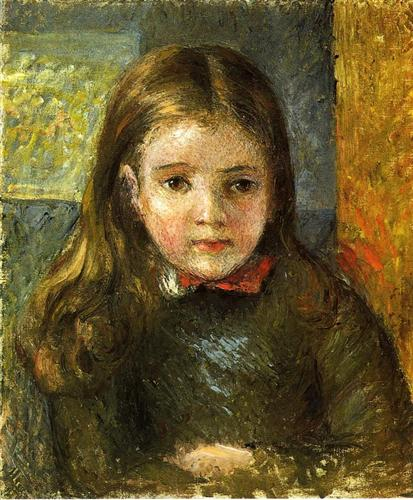
- Portrait of Georges by Camille Pissarro, 1880
- Born: 22 November 1871; Louveciennes, France
- Died: 20 January 1961 (aged 89)
- Education: Camille Pissarro (father)
- Known for: Painter
- Movement: Orientalist; Impressionist and Post-Impressionist

Georges Henri Manzana Pissarro (22 November 1871 – 20 January 1961) was a French artist who worked in Impressionist and Post-Impressionist styles.

Also known as 'Manzana', he was born in 1871 in France, at Louveciennes, the third child of Impressionist artist Camille Pissarro. He was of Portuguese-Jewish descent.

== See also ==
- Lucien Pissarro, brother of Georges Manzana-Pissarro
- List of French artists
- List of Orientalist artists
