= Exhibition of Australian Art in London =

Coordinates: 51.51°N 0.1437°W

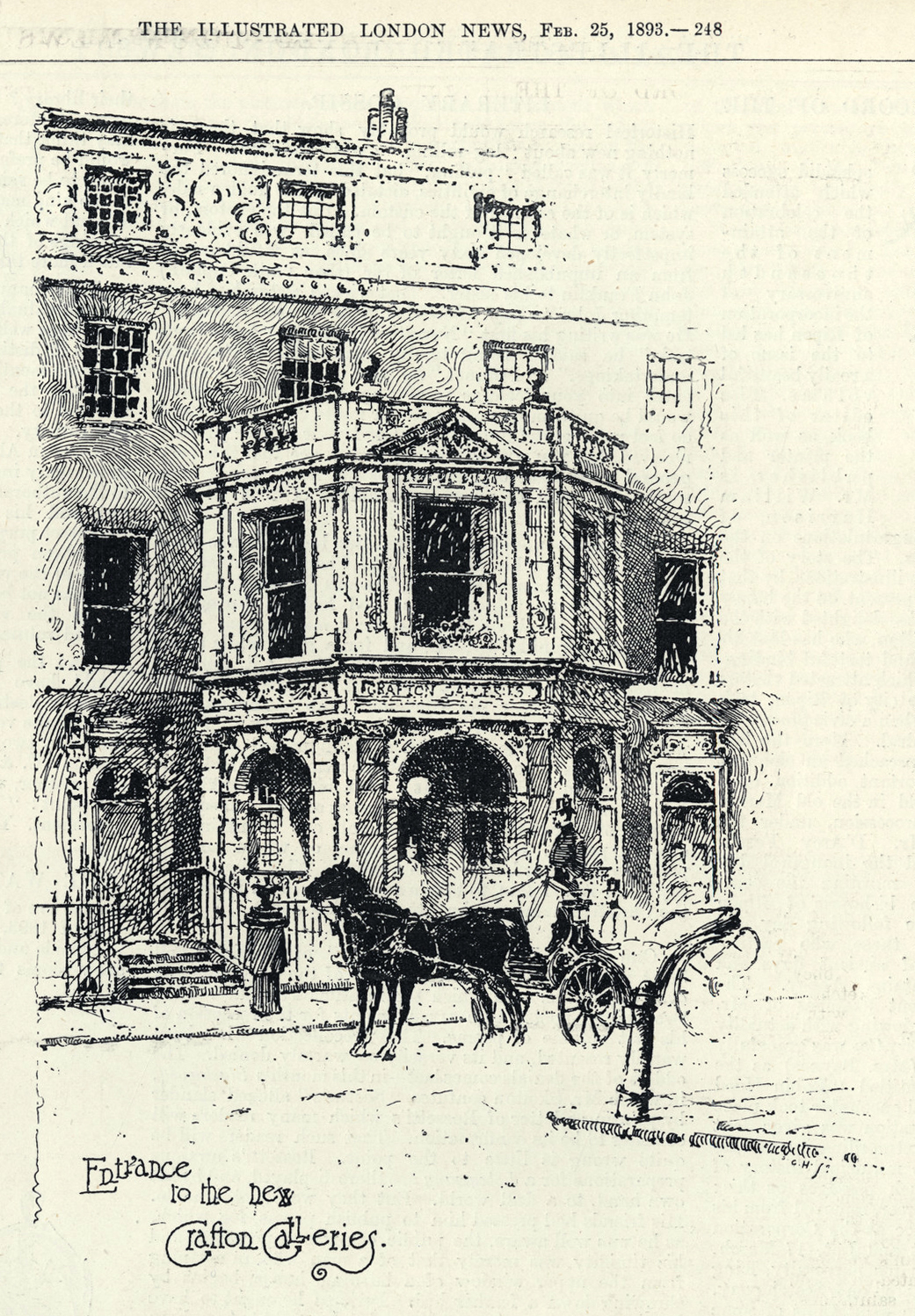
Illustration of the entry to Grafton Galleries, London, the site of the exhibition

The Exhibition of Australian Art in London was a show organised by the trustees of the Art Gallery of New South Wales (AGNSW), notably Julian Ashton, and financially supported by the philanthropist Eadith Walker. Held at London's Grafton Galleries between April and September 1898, it featured 371 artworks made in Australia by 114 artists, and was the first major exhibition of Australian art to occur internationally.

The exhibition focused almost exclusively on art from the previous ten years, a time of intense patriotic feeling in Britain's Australian colonies, which were then on the cusp of federating to form the Commonwealth of Australia. By staging the exhibition in London, the capital of the British Empire, the organisers sought to promote the idea of an emerging Australian tradition in Western art, and to depict the maturity of Australia as an embryonic nation. Some Australians also felt that local artists, compared to local writers, had hitherto been overlooked in Britain, and, as the Grafton Galleries catalogue highlighted, it was time to showcase a collection of works "for the judgement of connoisseurs outside of Australia."

In order to build a "representative" collection, the AGNSW trustees sought submissions from artists throughout the colonies. However, the final selection of works received criticism for evidencing a bias toward New South Wales artists, and several organisers, including Ashton, himself a prominent artist and taste-maker, were accused of self-promotion. Despite these controversies, the exhibition won considerable, if unanticipated, critical acclaim in Britain, and such was the show's popularity that Grafton Galleries kept it open for four months past the original closing date. It remains the largest exhibition of Australian art in Britain, and is also notable for its near equal representation of women artists, a far higher percentage than any other show of its kind.

== History ==
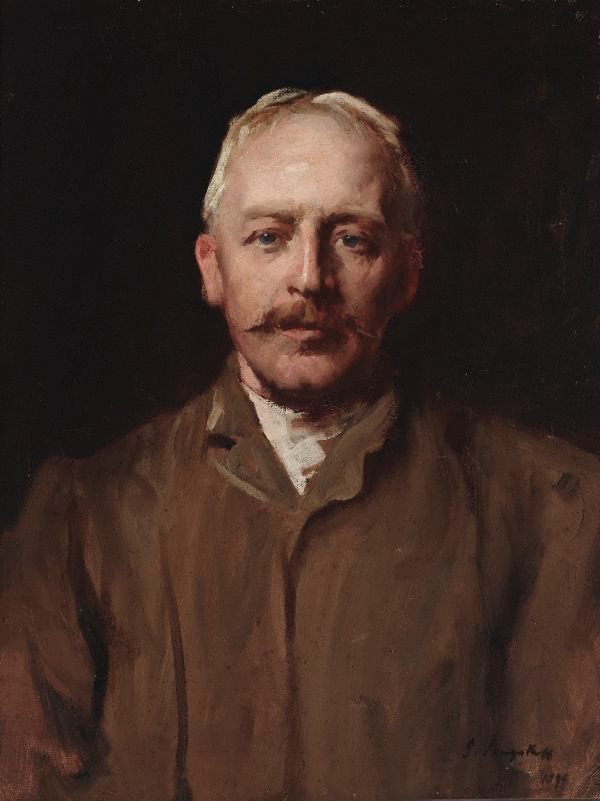
Portrait of Julian Ashton by John Longstaff (1898)

The main sponsor of the exhibition was Sydney philanthropist Eadith Walker, whose father, merchant banker and property developer Thomas Walker, left her with a sizeable inheritance in 1886. Taught that wealth "brought responsibilities and obligations", Eadith considered it her patriotic duty to support the development of Australian culture, in particular contemporary Australian art, as she was noted for her patronage of Tom Roberts, Arthur Streeton and other members of the impressionist Heidelberg School, acquiring many of their works. Upon appeal of the AGNSW trustees, Walker donated £740 for the staging of the London exhibition, or three quarters of its total budget. Although she expressly wished to leave the exhibition's curation "in the hands of those immediately involved with the movement", Walker loaned four works to the show, among them Purple, Green and Gold by Streeton and his own View of Sydney Harbour.

Apart from Walker, there were nine additional private lenders of art to the show. Conversely, "there was no shortage of supply for works offered by individual artists." Tasked with selecting works for the show, the AGNSW trustees created committees from Adelaide, Brisbane, and Melbourne to suggest works from their respective colonies. The trustees arrived at their final decision under the advice of members of the Art Society and Society of Artists, both based in Sydney. One of the trustees, influential artist, teacher and president of the Society of Artists, Julian Ashton, had nineteen of his works selected, the most of any artist. For this, Ashton was accused of abusing his power, and in early 1898, the Minister's Department was presented a petition asking for Ashton to resign as a trustee. However, he was not the only organiser who received preferential treatment. Albert Henry Fullwood, vice president of the Society of Artists, would have seventeen works included. Similarly, William Lister Lister included fourteen of his canvases after the trustees chose him to oversee the selection of works from the Art Society, for which he served as vice president. Nepotism seemed to extend beyond New South Wales to Queensland with two paintings by Godfrey Rivers, the Queensland Art Gallery's secretary of trustees and curator, being the only ones selected from the museum's batch of submitted works.

Despite "clear displays of favouritism", the final selection of works received praise for it uniting many professional and amateur artists of different styles. Although artists born and living in Australia contributed the majority of works, the show was not limited to this group, as had been reported by some uninformed British journalists. Provided the works submitted were created in Australia and "typical of the country", native-born artists residing overseas, such as Streeton, as well as migrant artists, such as Charles Conder, were welcome to apply. In total, forty-five works by Australian artists based in Europe were included in the exhibition. Another well-represented group were women artists, who, regarding the selection of works, almost equalled men. No other "major survey" of Australian art in London has come close to reaching this level of female representation.

In their search for an appropriate London venue to stage the exhibition, the trustees required one that was "large enough for almost 400 exhibits, modern by repute to suit the nature of the work, and available in the busy spring exhibition season of art events". Grafton Galleries, situated on London's Bond Street and renowned as one of the city's "most modern" commercial venues, turned out to be a "perfect match".

The exhibition opened on 2 April.

== Critical reception ==
Silence fell, the silence of surprise and real admiration.

— The News Letter, recounting the moment the critics entered the gallery and saw the art for the first time

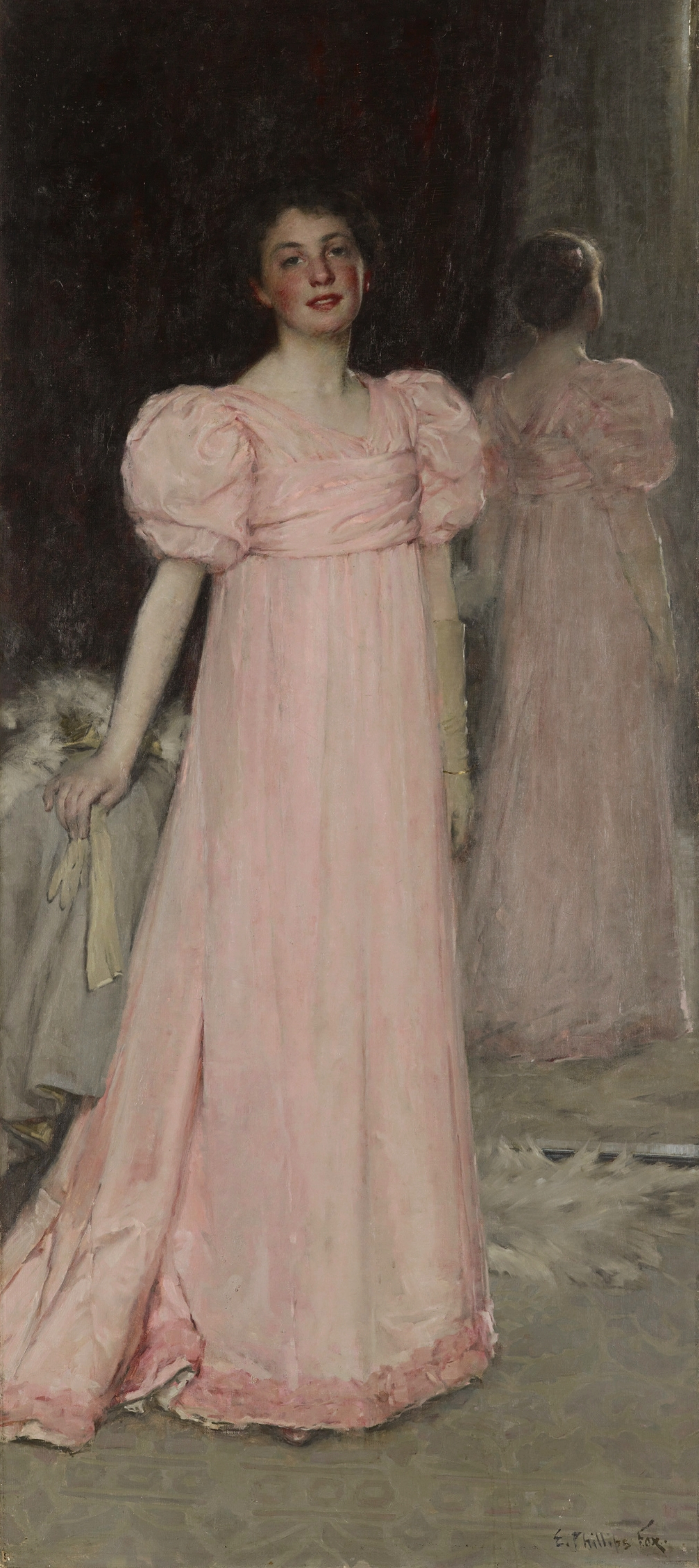
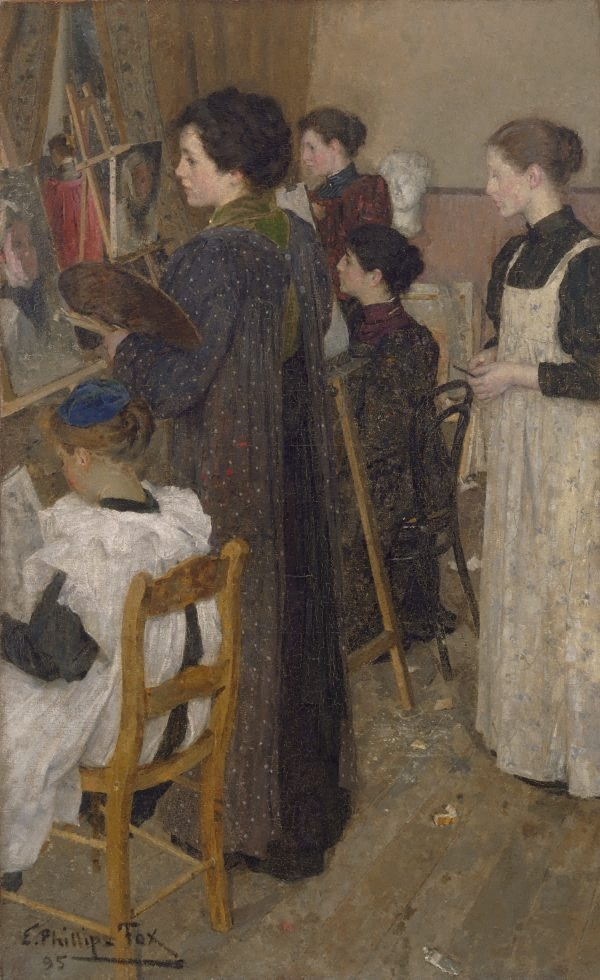
While academic works such as E. Phillips Fox's Portrait of My Cousin (left) received praise, the show's more realist, "French School inspired" canvases, such as his Art Students (right), were not considered as noble by some English critics.

Robert Stevenson, one of London's leading art critics, found the show to be "bounding in virtuosity", and compared it favourably to the Australian art he had seen on display at the 1886 Colonial Exhibition, much of which he reviewed poorly at the time. "Now, from every wall of the Grafton accomplishment stares at you", he wrote. "I have been so much astonished at the rapid growth of Australian art that I feel any criticism of the work must savour of impertinence and ungraciousness." The Westminster Gazette reported that the Australian artists "show a vigorous independence in many respects, and who, though not absolutely in the first rank, show an extremely interesting point of view and a graphic power which is really admirable."

The exhibition's plein airists, particularly Arthur Streeton and Tom Roberts—regarded as leaders of the Heidelberg School movement—were often singled out for praise. In reviewing Streeton's large square canvas, ‘The purple noon's transparent might’ (1896), The Studio declared that it "would hold its own in any London gallery." The Artist, too, listed the painting as a highlight of the show, and said that in Golden Summer, Eaglemont (1889), Streeton was also at his best. Robert Stevenson commended the works of Heidelberg School artist Walter Withers, opining that they were perhaps the most beautiful on display.

Many critics noted with surprise the degree to which modern French art had influenced Australian tendencies. Reviewing the collection as whole, Thomas Humphry Ward observed that, "the broad, summary treatment, the firm and yet careful drawing, and the manner of laying on paint are in origin French." While The Westminster Gazette took "the greatest pleasure" in the "agreeable air of 'un-Britishness'" that pervaded the collection, the critics for The Globe and The Architect lamented the clear influence of progressive French art on the Australians. The Architect's critic stated that, barring one or two exceptions, "there is nothing to suggest any tie between the colony and England, nor any work which is reminiscent of an English scene." These two reviews—the only mostly negative one to appear in the English press—pointed to a sense of "cultural or familial betrayal", and rather than criticise specific works, they "exposed the cultural, political and historical antagonism between the French and English, one which was being fought equally in the galleries as in contemporary newspapers."

British critics disagreed over whether the show demonstrated that a distinctive "Australian School" of art had emerged. In a mixed review, London's The Star concluded that the art of Australia "has no special distinction of its own", citing the strong French influence. On the other hand, The Times said that the techniques of French art, "by transplantation" to Australia, had "become, in a measure, transformed". A London correspondent for Australia's The Age wrote: "The critics seem quite puzzled how to criticise. Their usual standards of comparison are useless." He continued, saying that while some Australian artists drew on French influences, this did not sufficiently explain the difference between Australian and British art:

Apart from technique, surely climate, soil and atmosphere have affected Streeton, McCubbin, Longstaff and Alston? Our hot sun, our coppery skies, our glowing sunsets, equally with our commonplace mining and grazing and farming, all call for dinstinctive handling, which they will never get through the methods of the British school. ... The departures from the aims and tendencies of British art by Australian art has surely begun.

== Sales ==
In the lead-up to the exhibition, Ashton, in a letter to Walker, predicted that the venture would generate £1,000 through sales. His estimate was ultimately exceeded by £131, with 49 works being purchased by 25 individual buyers. Given the organisers' expectations, and considering that approximately one third of the show's works were on loan and not available for sale, this proved to be a satisfactory rate of acquisition.

Henry Bishop, Secretary of the Grafton Galleries, was the principal buyer at the exhibition, spending £302 on eight pieces, including three major landscapes by Tasmanian Romanticist painter William Piguenit, the exhibition's most commercially successful artist. Charles Sedelmeyer, a leading art dealer based in Paris, purchased five works by four artists, notably Tudor St. George Tucker's Sunset.

Despite attracting rave reviews from English critics, the exhibited works of the Heidelberg School painters received little commercial success. David Davies' A Bush Home (1896), purchased by English artist Alfred East, was the only Heidelberg School painting to sell. In an article for Australia's Daily Telegraph, Piguenit highlighted the discrepancy between critical opinion and public taste in England: "The English people are not guided very largely by what they see in the papers about pictures. ... their purchase will be guided by fancy, not by critics." Apart from Piguenit's sublime wilderness paintings and other traditional landscapes by the likes of William Lister Lister, buyers were also interested in the drawings and watercolours of the exhibition's women artists, especially their Australian floral subjects, which comprised almost half of sales. According to Petrit Abazi, the sales "indicate that art characterised by conventional, exotic and academic principles, and not the plein air or School of Paris adopted by the Australian van guard, was best received on the English market."

== List of artists ==
- Elizabeth Caroline Armstrong
- Julian Ashton
- Arthur Merric Boyd
- Emma Minnie Boyd
- R. Sidney Cocks
- Arthur Collingridge
- Charles Conder
- Gordon Coutts
- Edith Cusack
- Alfred James Daplyn
- David Davies
- Rosa Fiveash
- Amandus Julius Fischer
- Gerald Fitzgerald
- Margaret Flockton
- E. Phillips Fox
- Albert Henry Fullwood
- Henry Garlick
- Lindsay Bernard Hall
- Helen Hambidge
- Albert J. Hanson
- Hans Heysen
- Livingston Hopkins
- Tom Humphrey
- Nelson Illingworth
- John Llewellyn Jones
- George Washington Lambert
- W. Lister Lister
- Artur Loureiro
- Sydney Long
- John Longstaff
- Frank Mahony
- John Mather
- Phil May
- Frederick McCubbin
- Emily Meston
- Benjamin Edwin Minns
- Alice Jane Muskett
- John Ford Paterson
- William Piguenit
- George Pontin
- James Peter Quinn
- Richard Godfrey Rivers
- Tom Roberts
- Jessie Emily Scarvell
- Jan Hendrik Scheltema
- Percy Spence
- Ethel Stephens
- Mary Stoddard
- Arthur Streeton
- Jane Sutherland
- Tudor St. George Tucker
- John Samuel Watkins
- Walter Withers

== Gallery ==
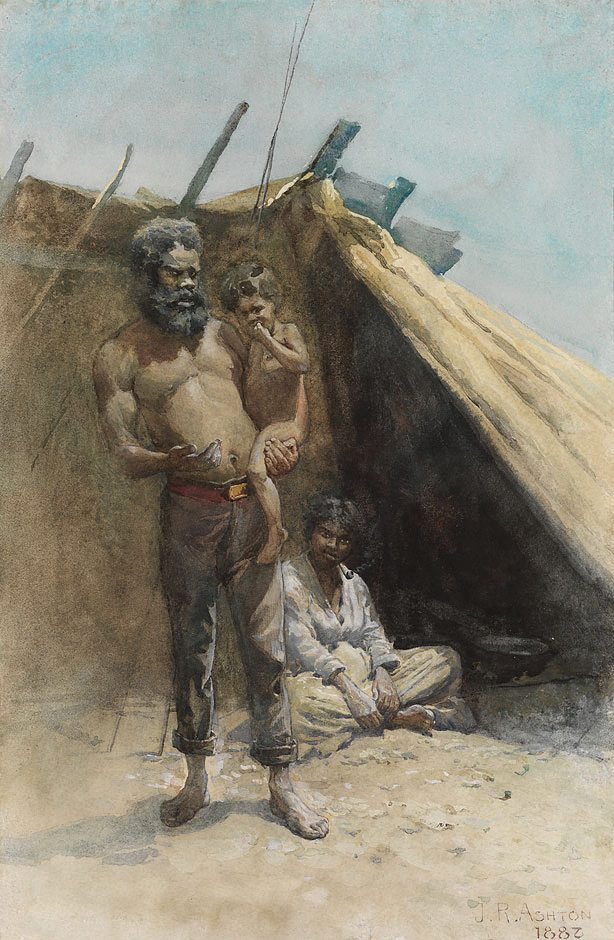
Julian Ashton, Aboriginal Family Group, 1886

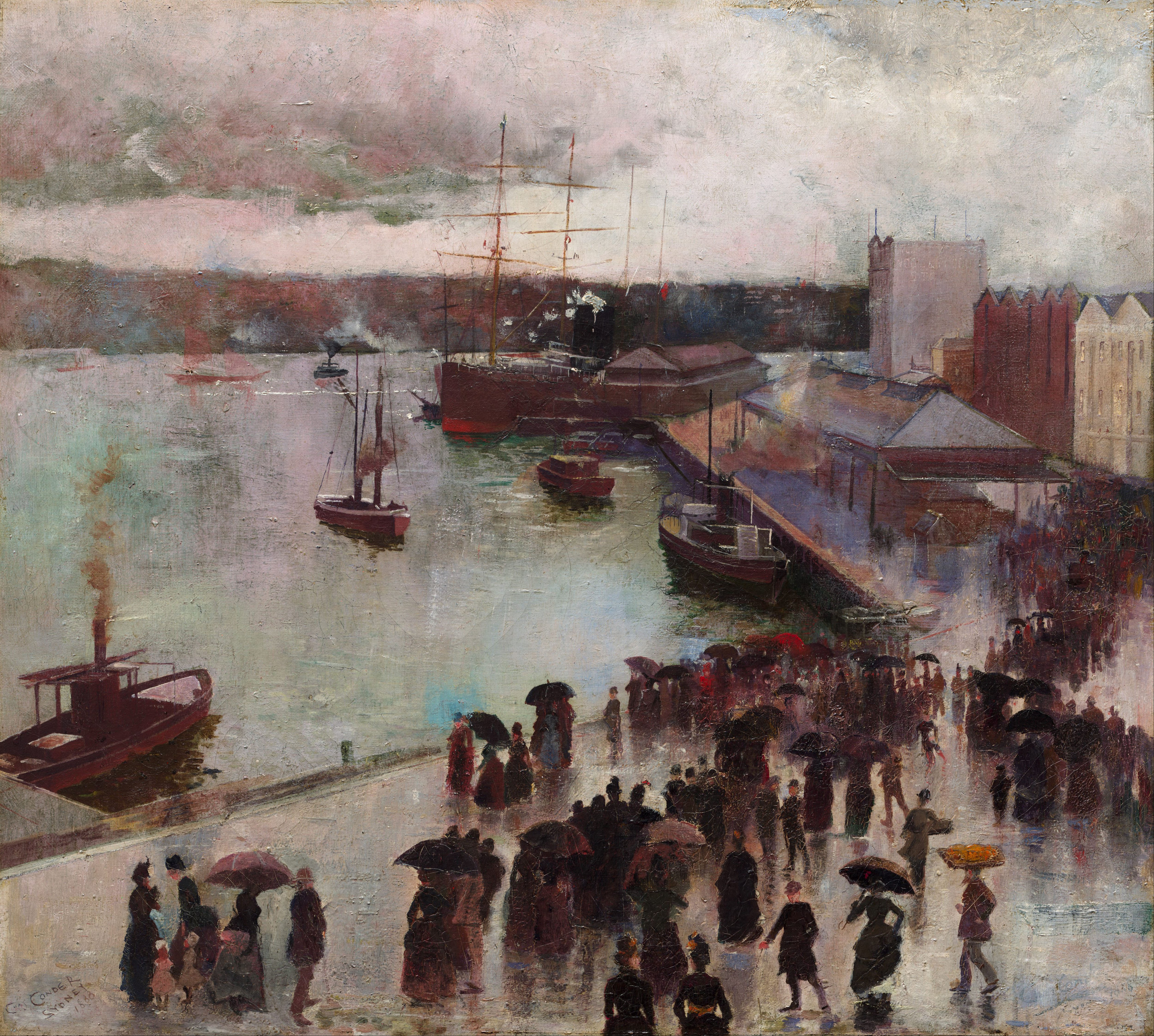
Charles Conder, Departure of the Orient, 1888

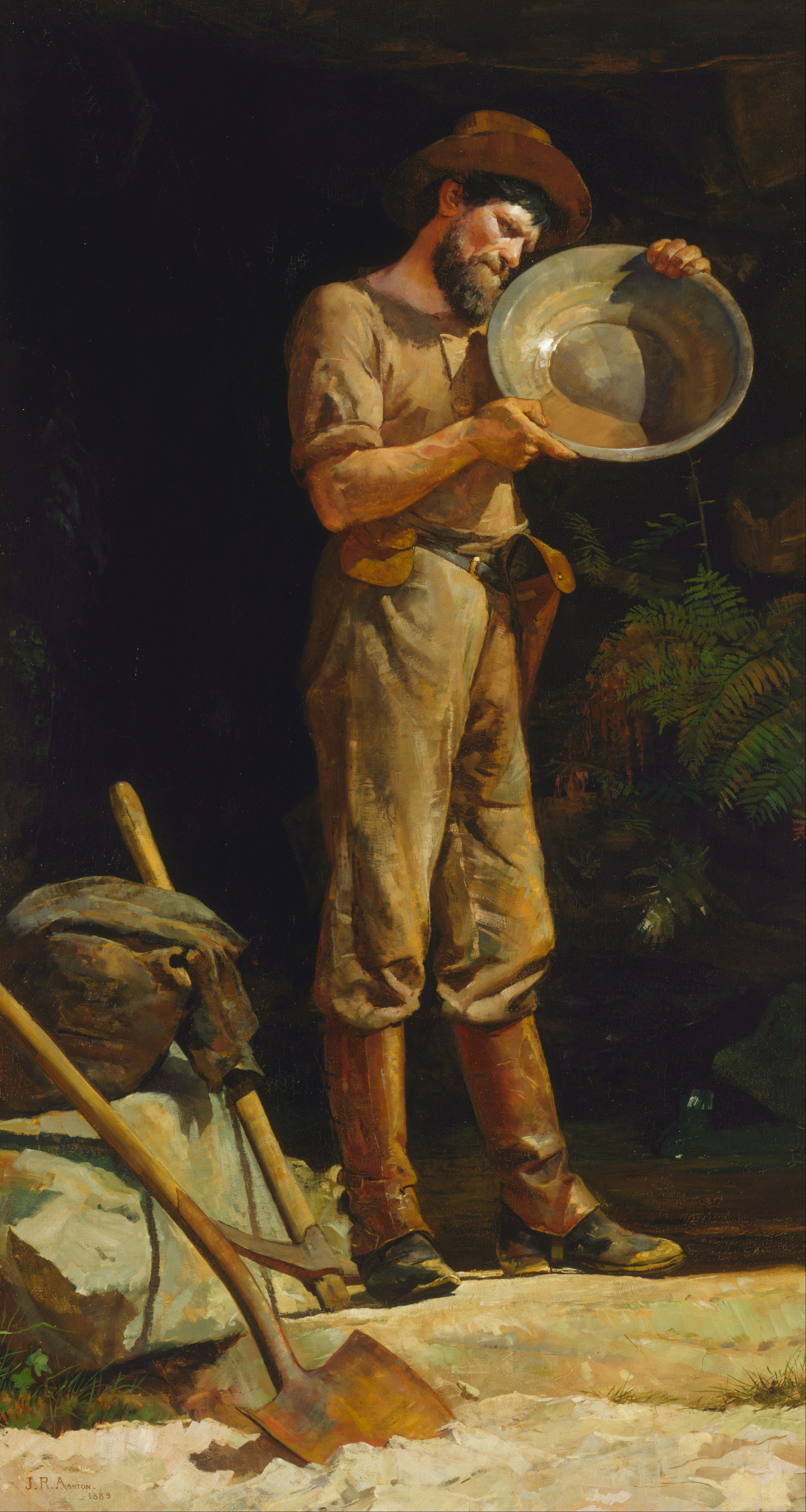
Julian Ashton, The Prospector, 1889

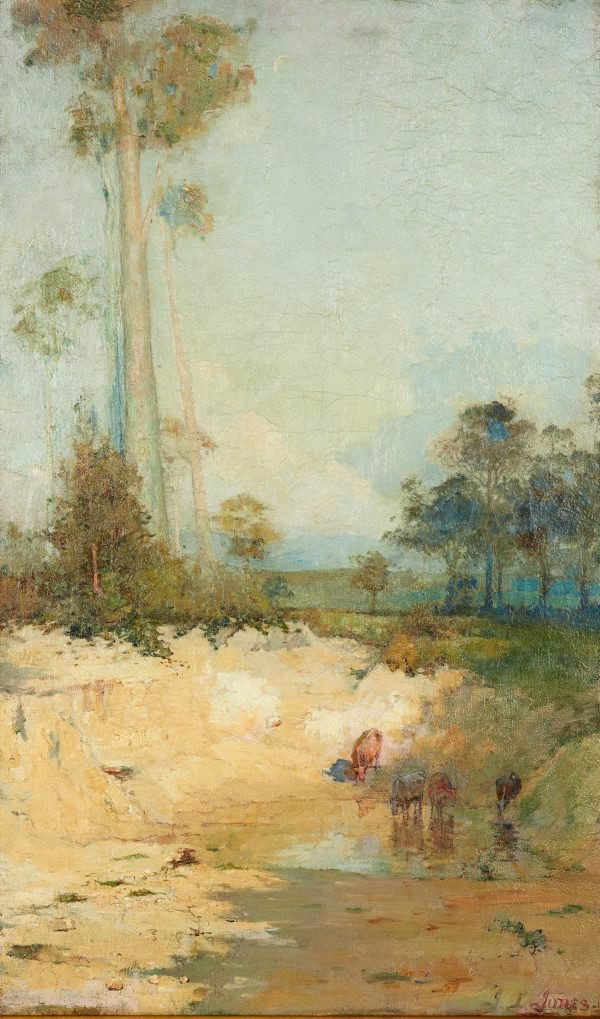
John Llewellyn Jones, The Dry Season, 1889

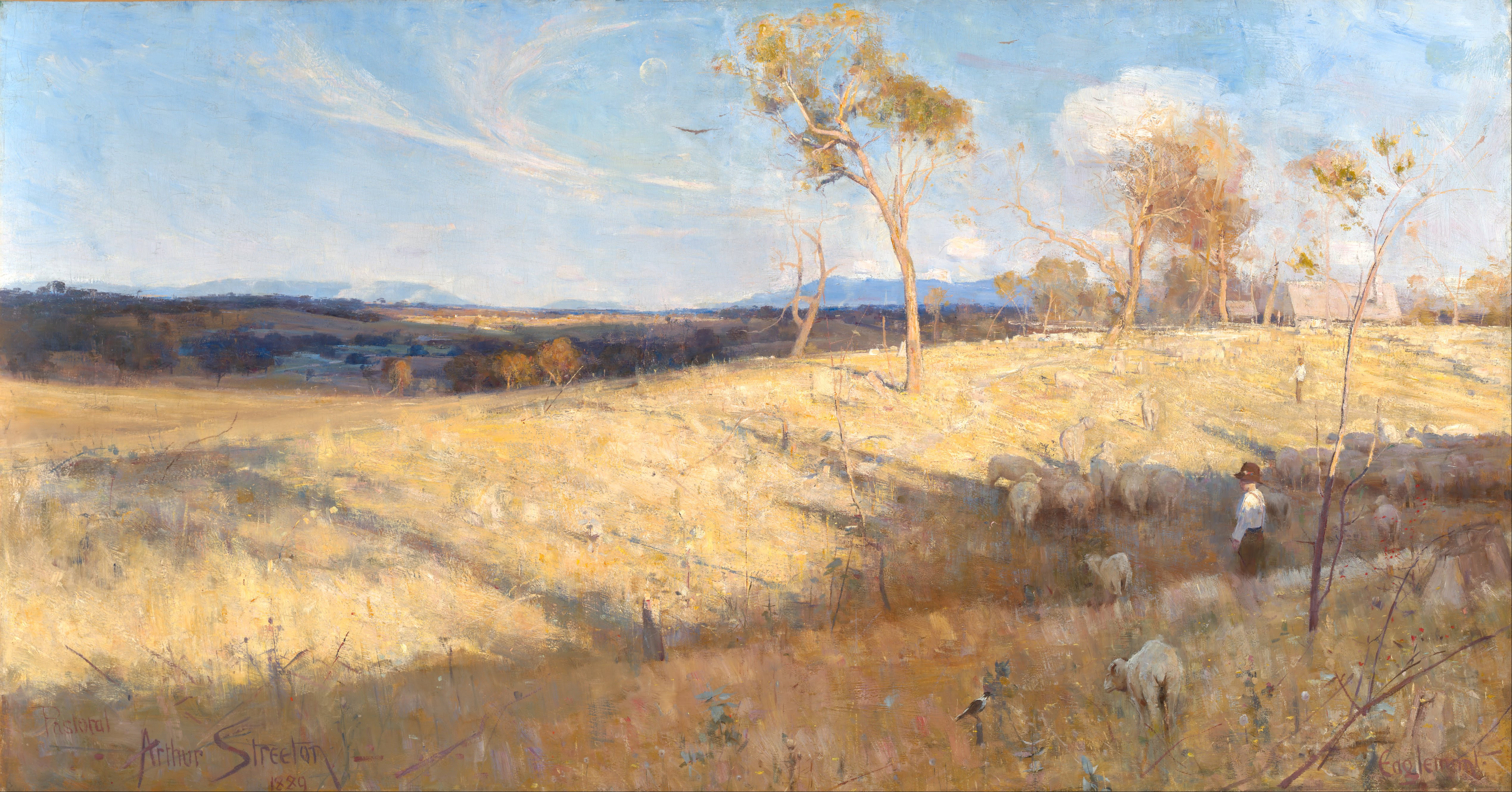
Arthur Streeton, Golden Summer, Eaglemont, 1889

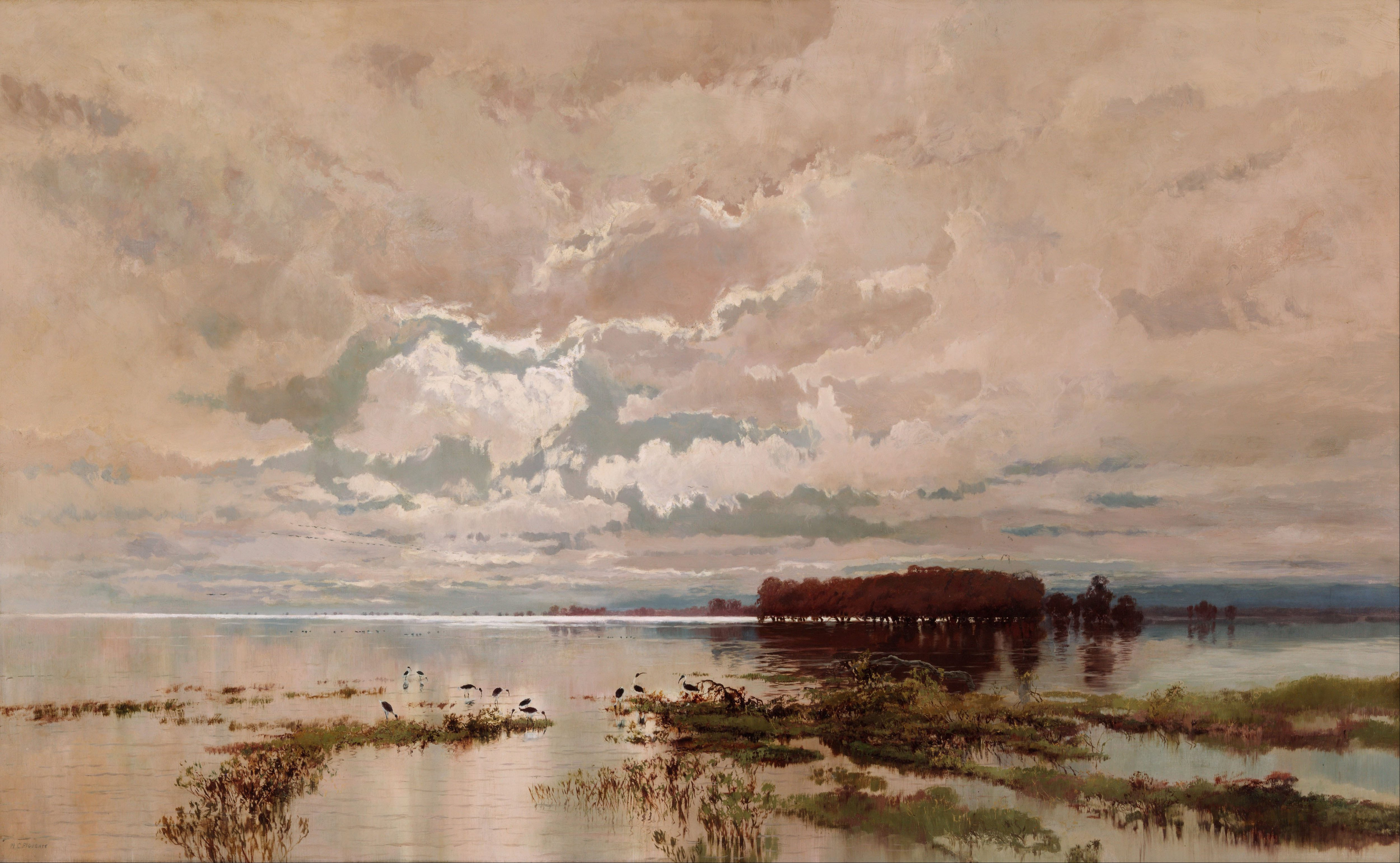
W C Piguenit, The Flood in the Darling, 1890

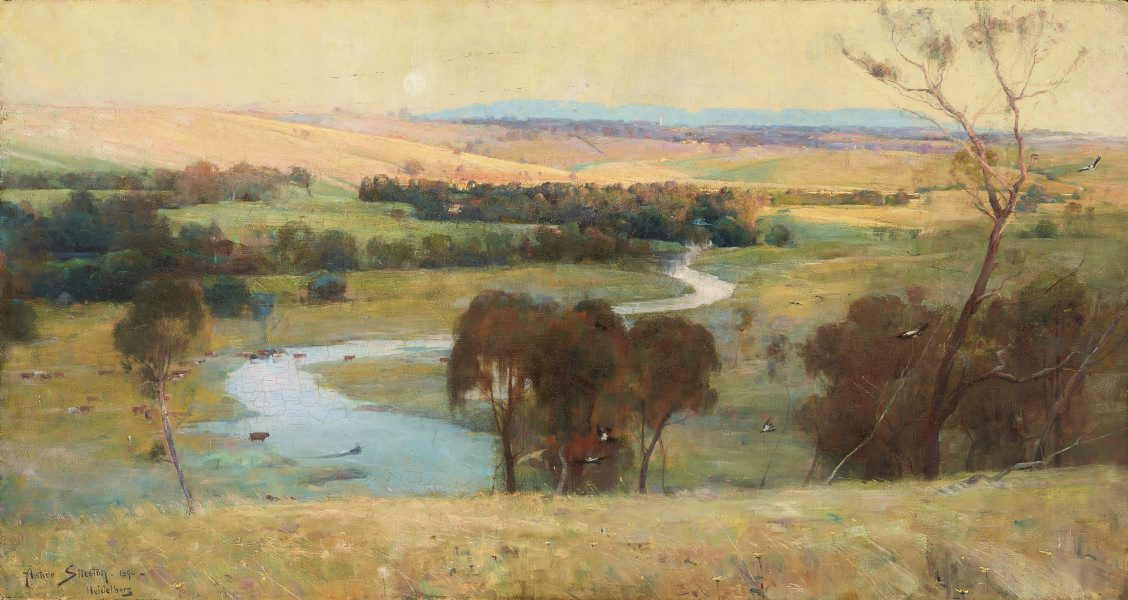
Arthur Streeton, ‘Still glides the stream, and shall for ever glide’, 1890

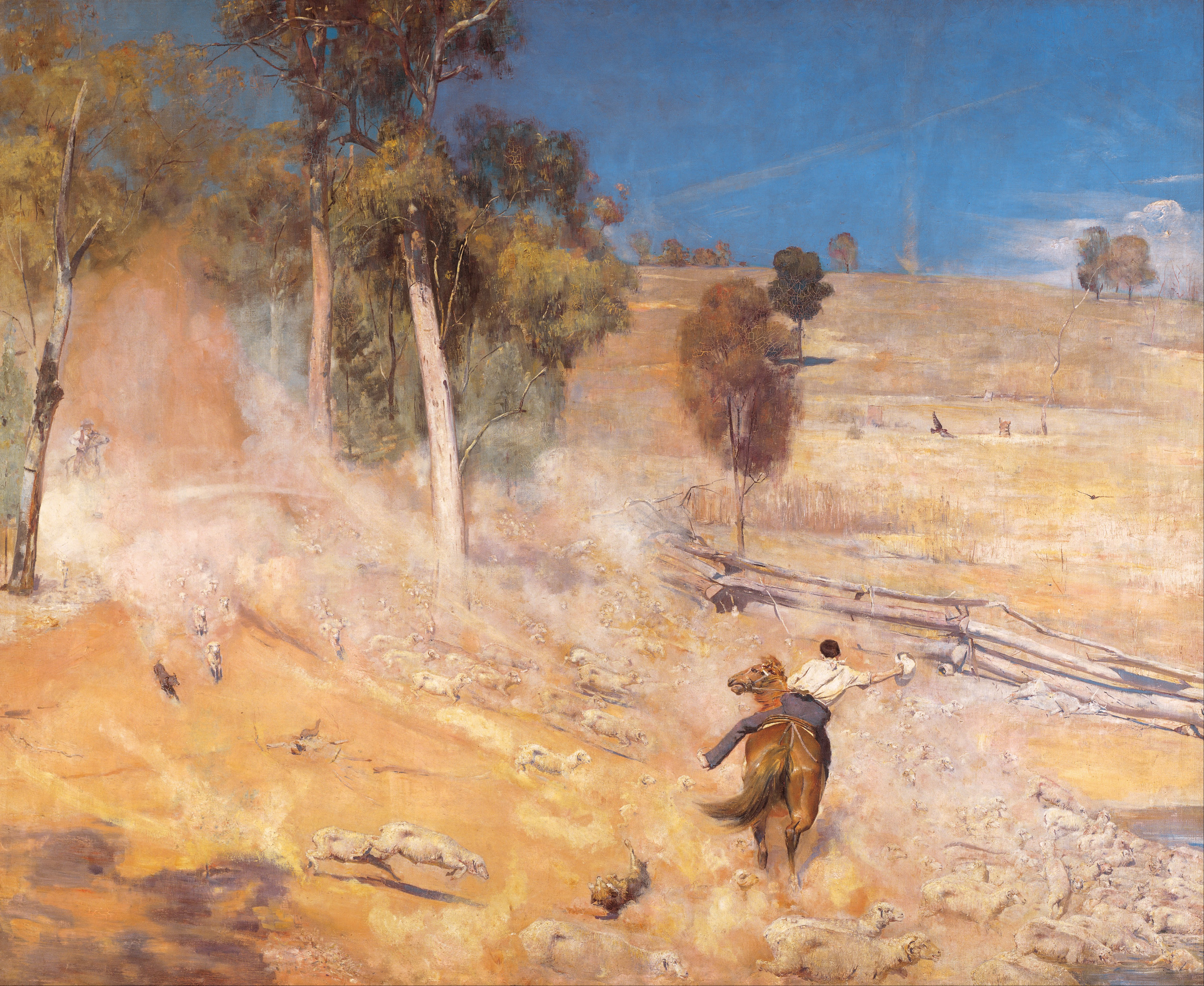
Tom Roberts, A break away!, 1891

Arthur Streeton, Fire's on, 1891

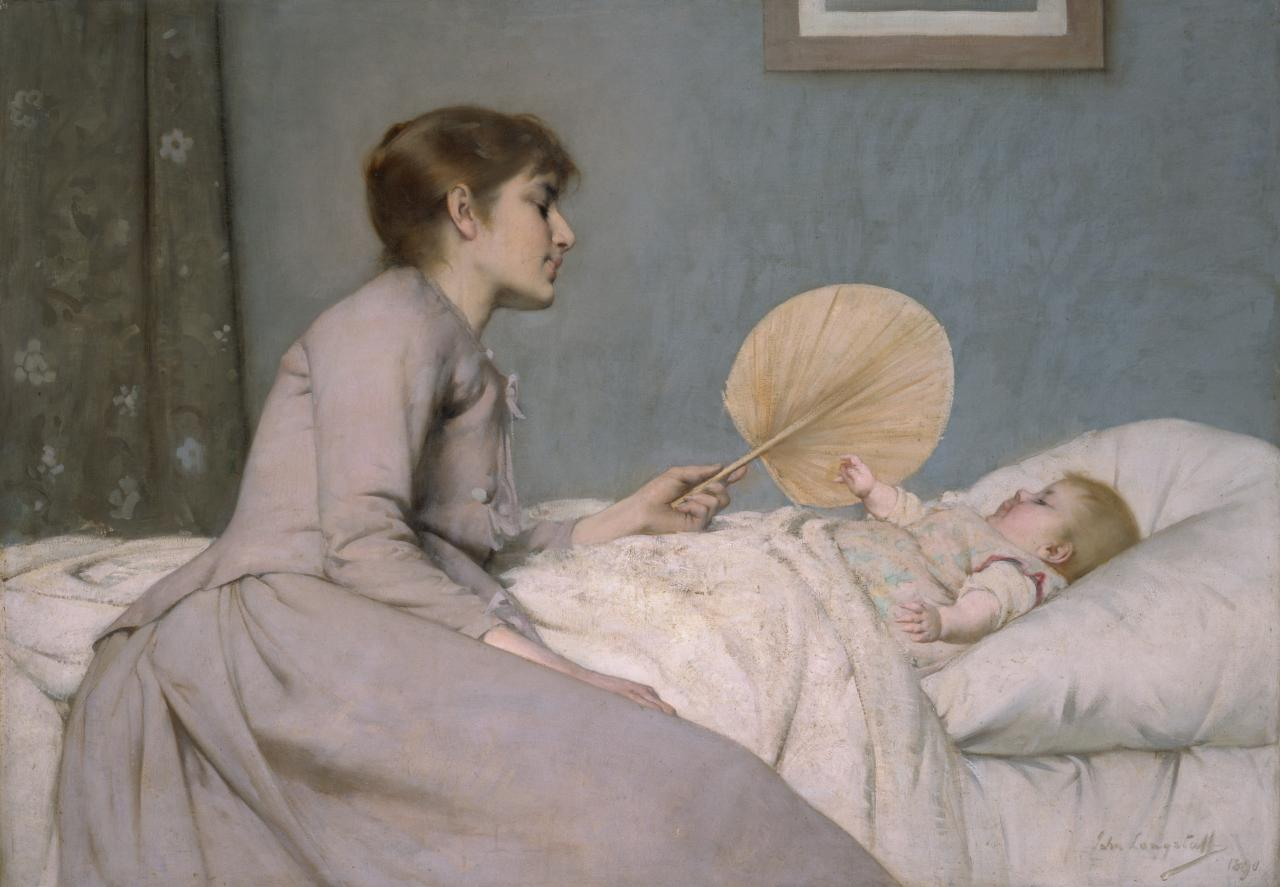
John Longstaff, The Young Mother, 1891

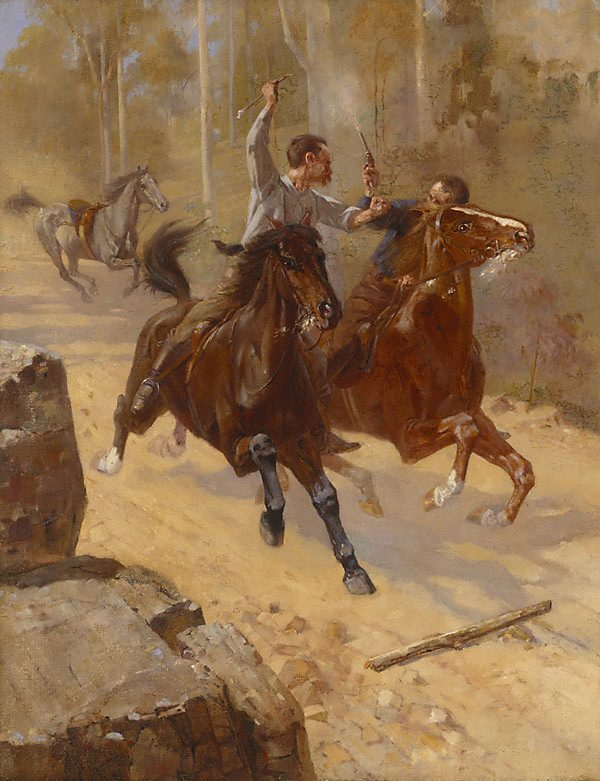
Frank Mahony, As in the Days of Old, 1892

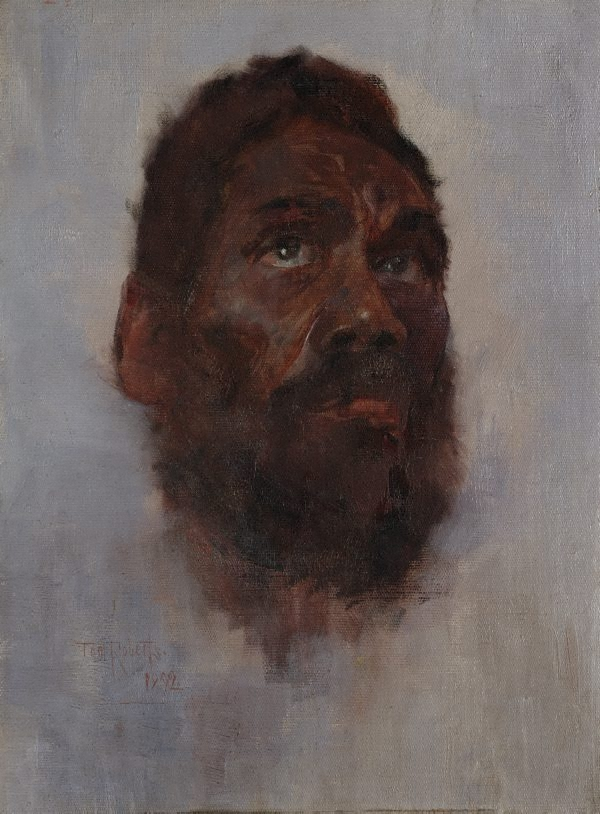
Tom Roberts, Aboriginal Head – Charlie Turner, 1892

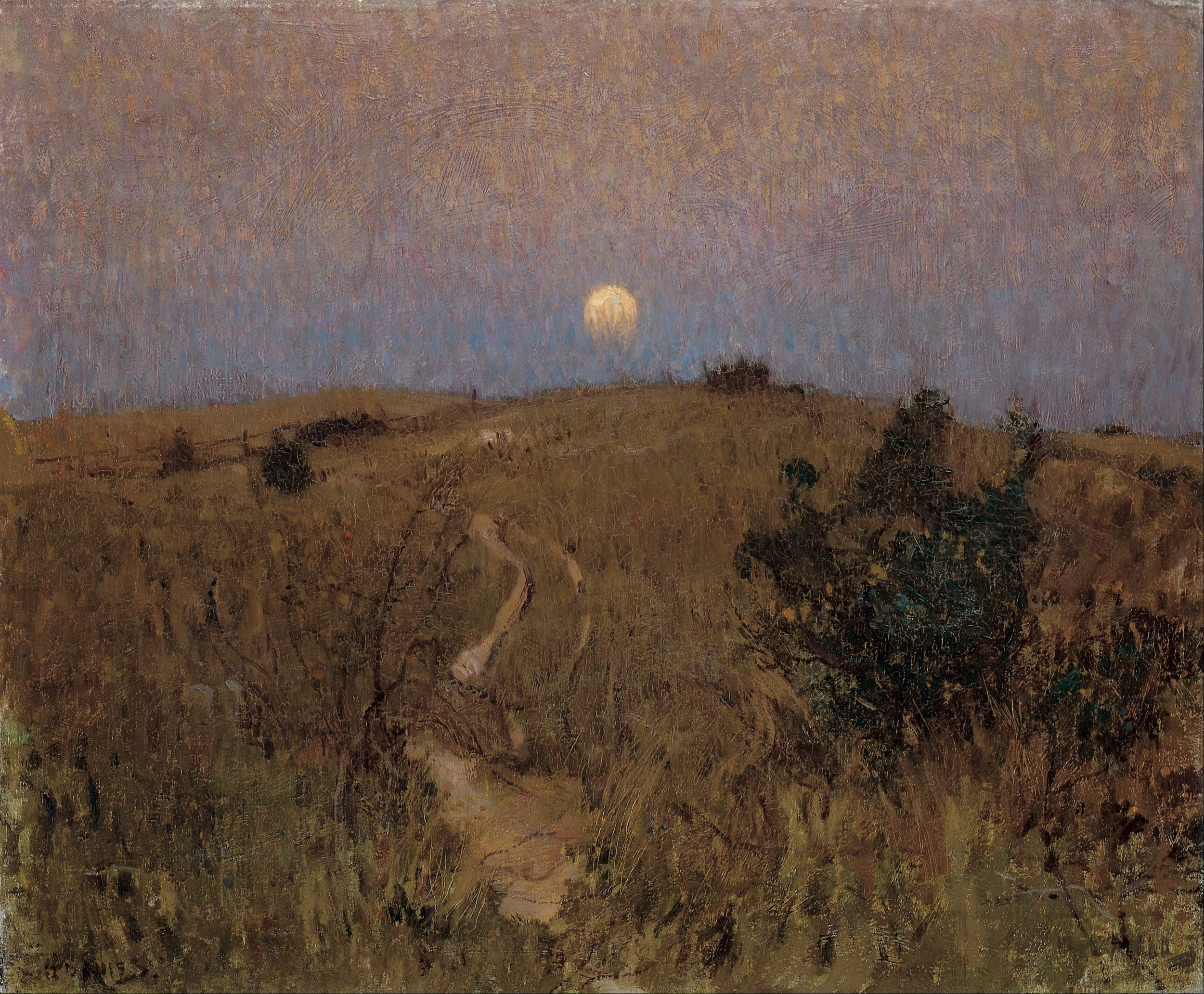
David Davies, Moonrise, 1893

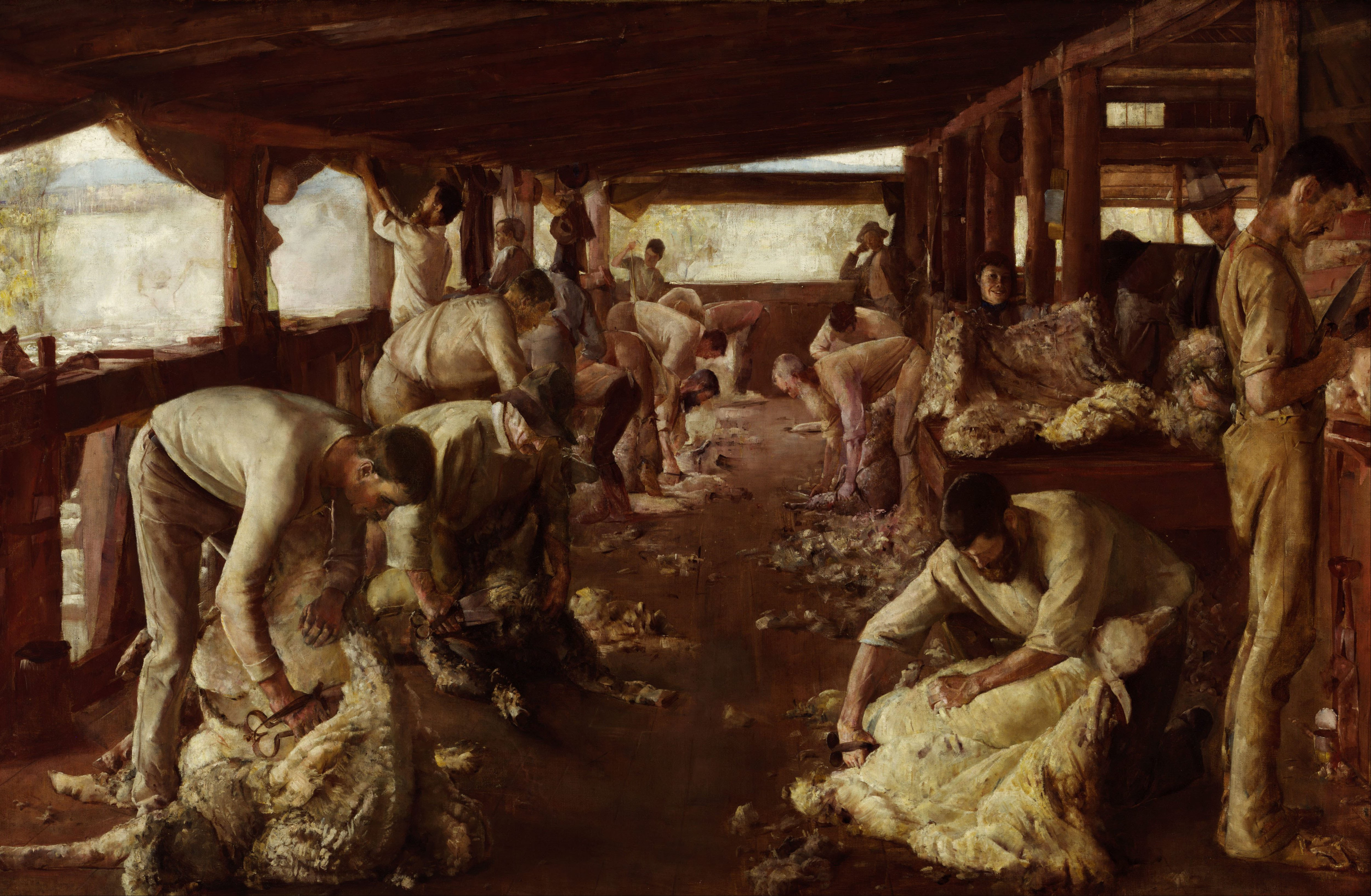
Tom Roberts, The Golden Fleece, 1894

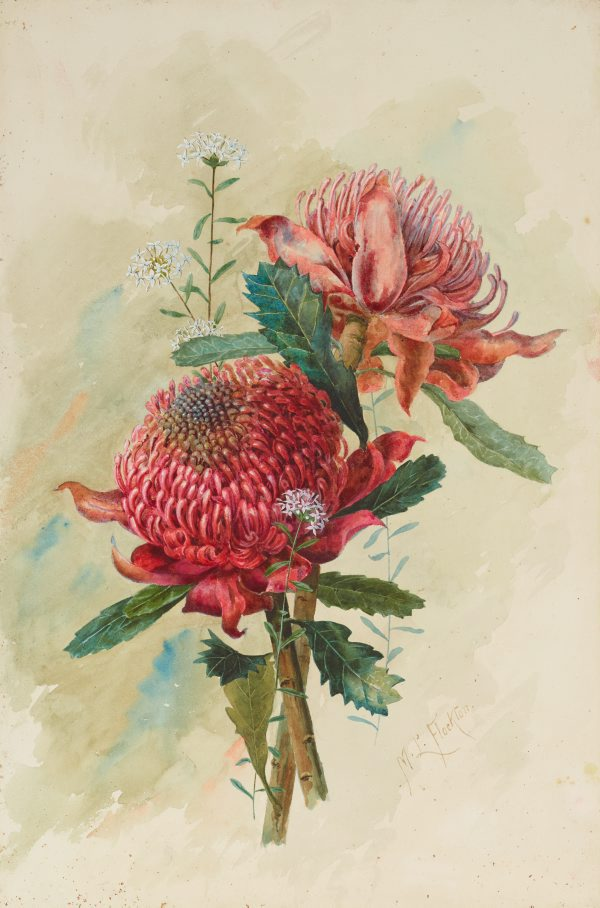
Margaret Lilian Flockton, Waratahs, 1895

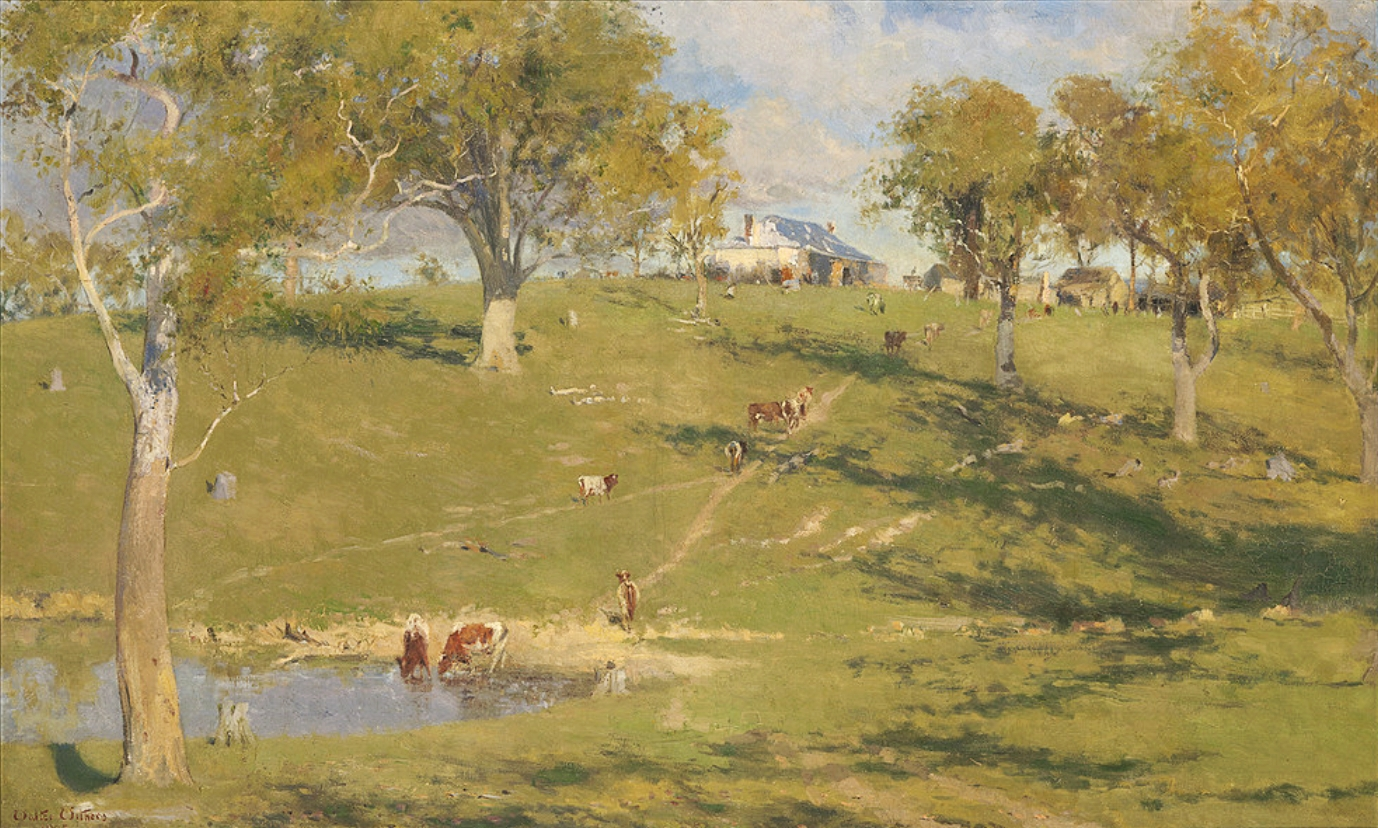
Walter Withers, Tranquil Winter, 1895

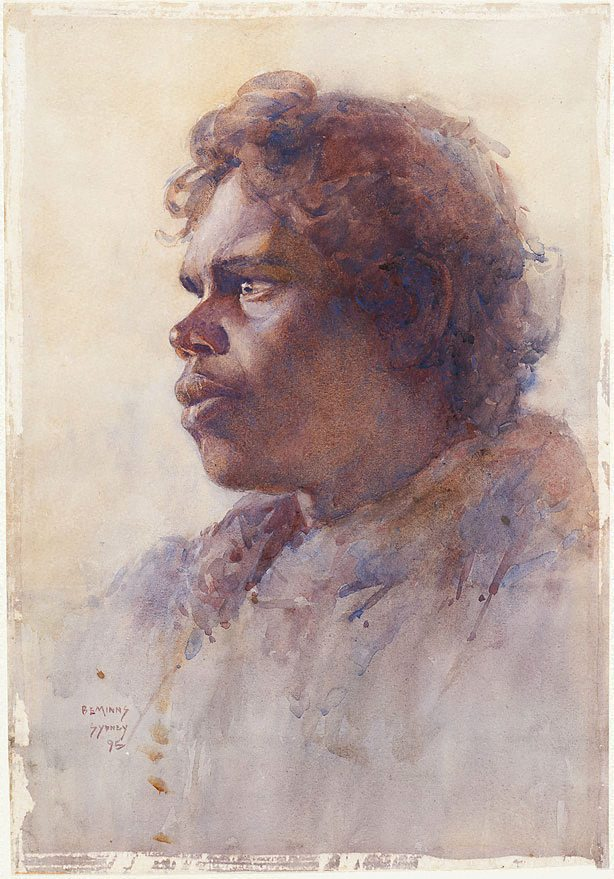
B E Minns, Australian Aboriginal Female, Sydney, 1895

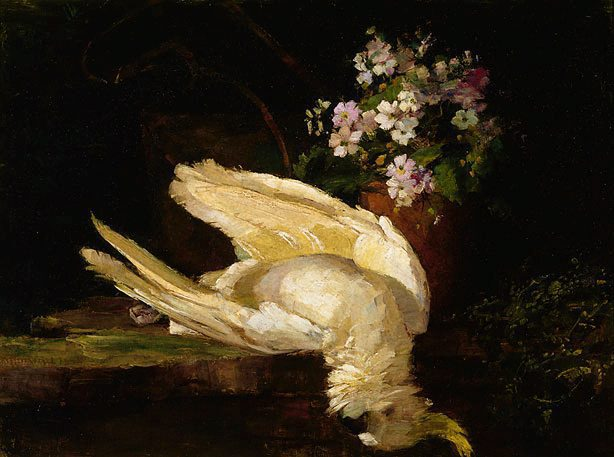
Margaret Fleming, The Cockatoo, 1895

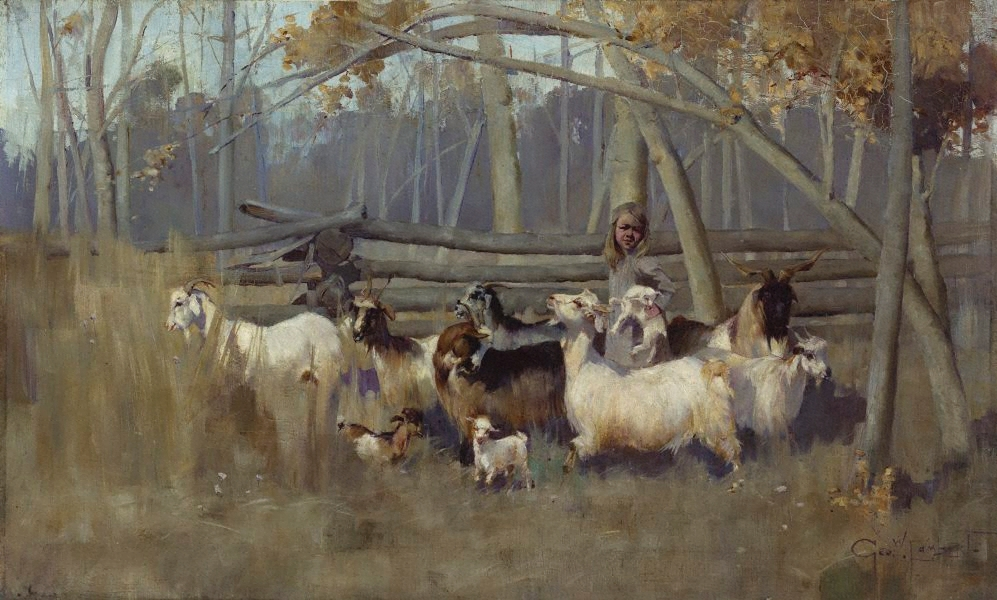
George Washington Lambert, A Bush Idyll, 1896

Sydney Long, By Tranquil Waters, 1896

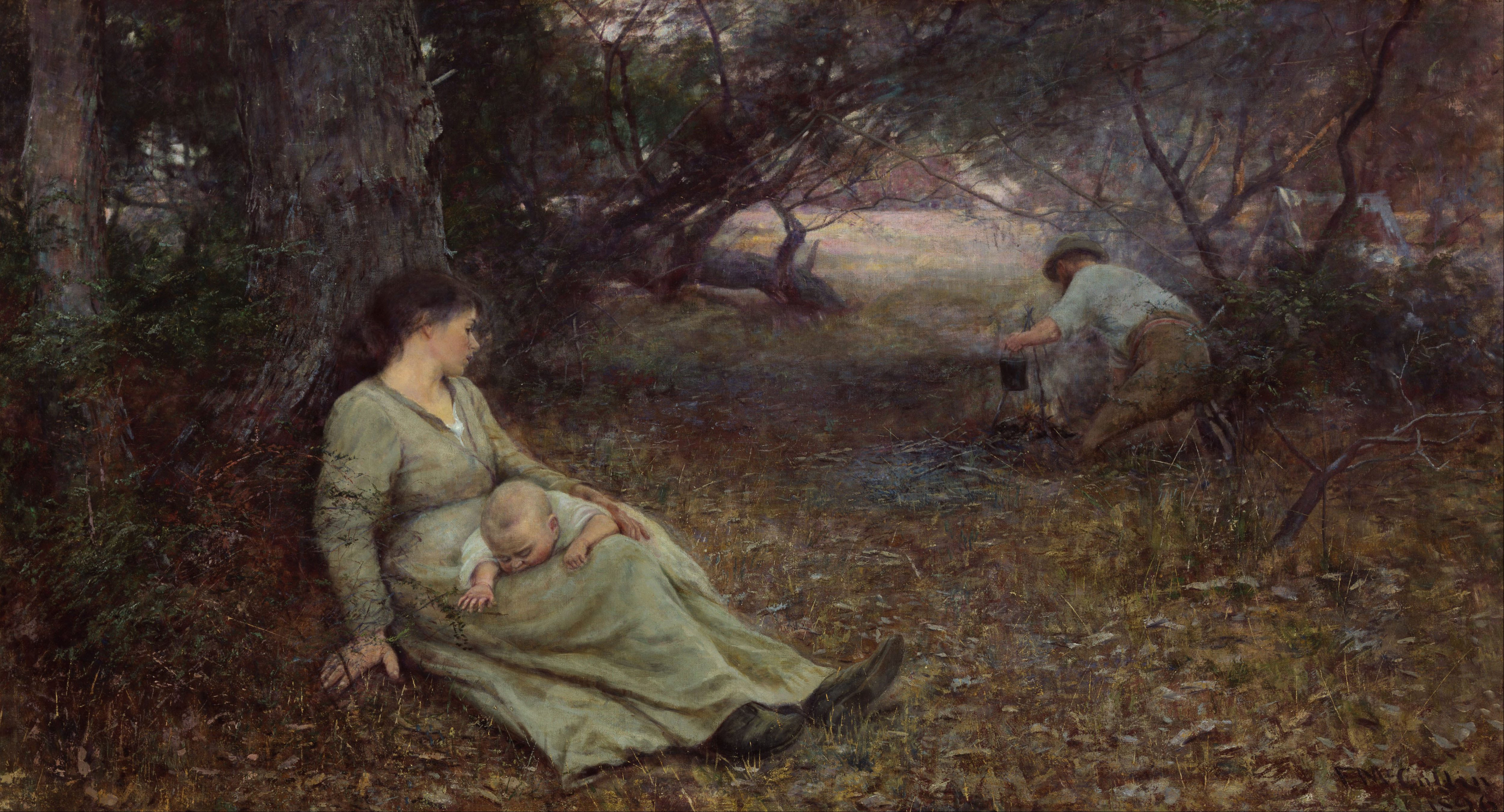
Frederick McCubbin, On the wallaby track, 1896

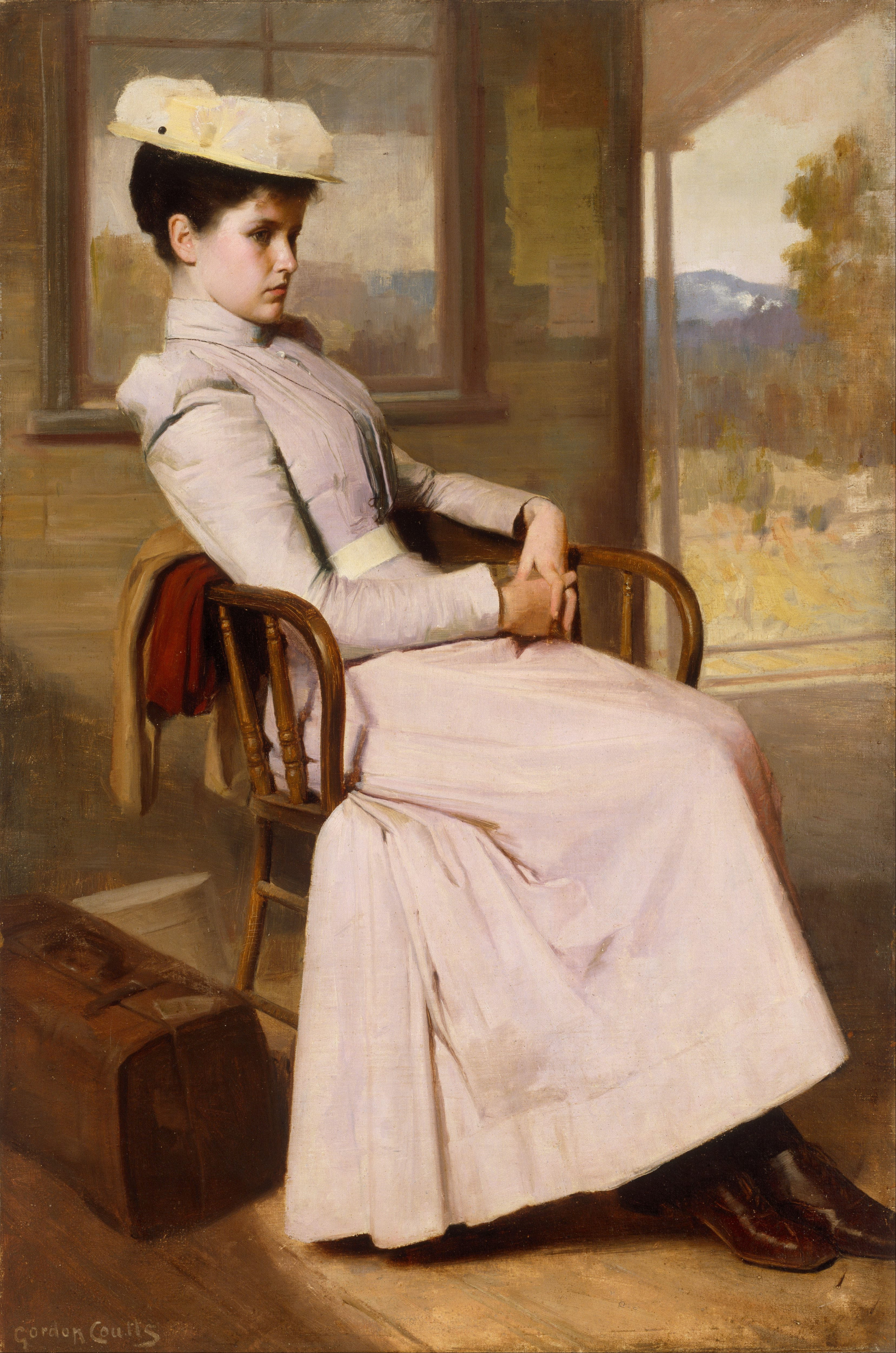
Gordon Coutts, Waiting, 1896

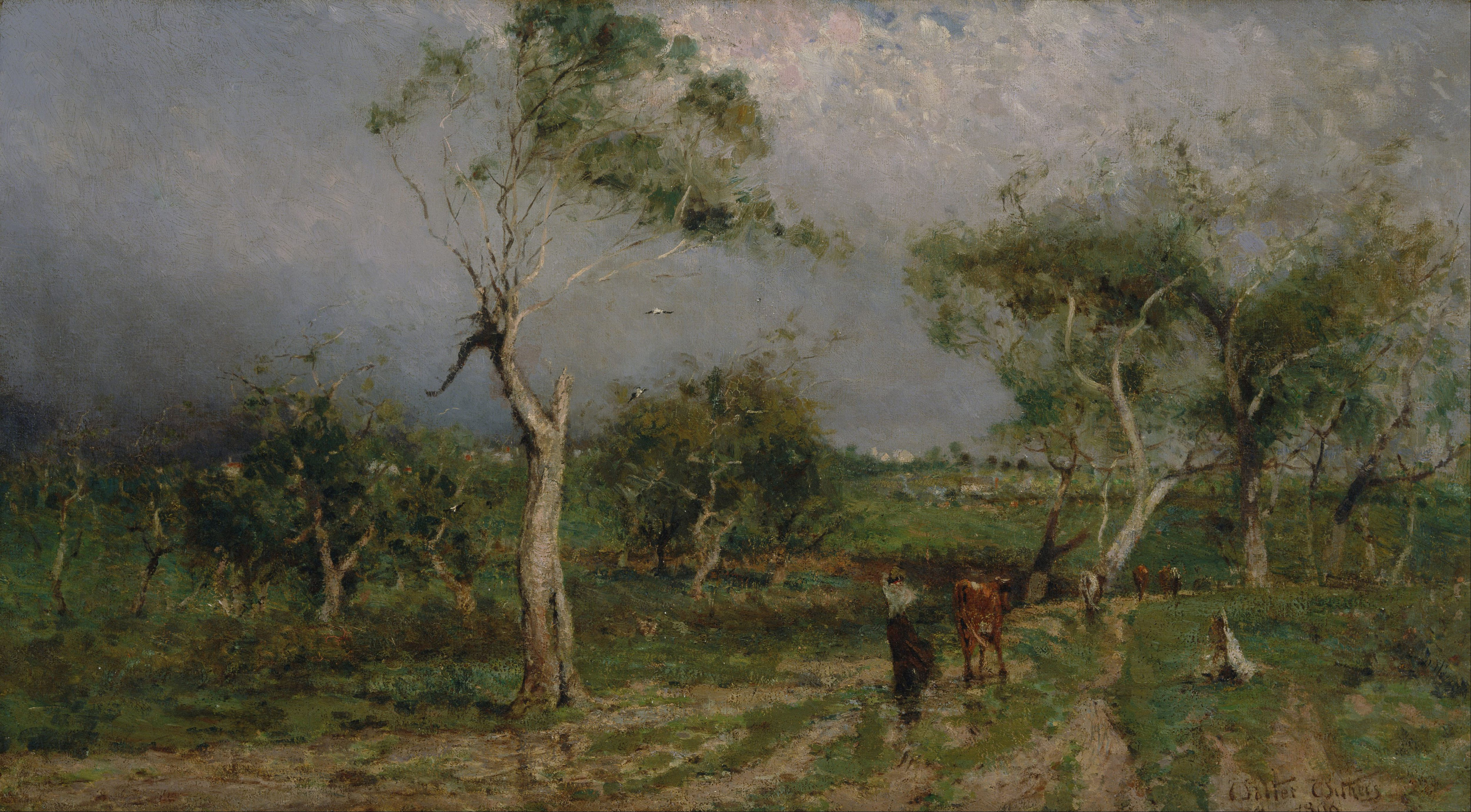
Walter Withers, The Storm, 1896

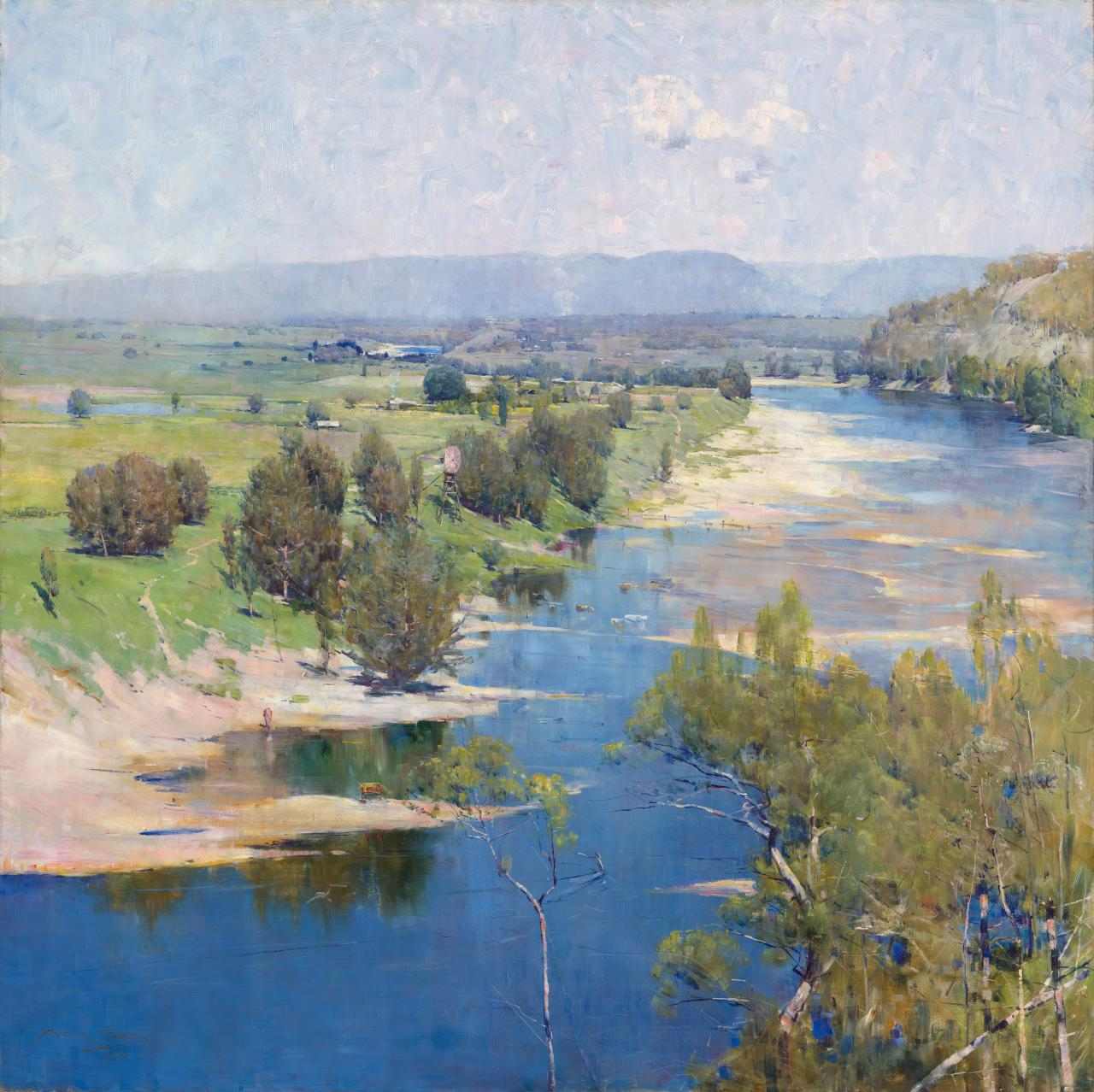
Arthur Streeton, ‘The purple noon's transparent might’, 1896

== Legacy ==
According to Petrit Abizi, the Exhibition of Australian Art in London "remains the most ambitious project of its kind realised outside of Australia", and inspired a level of interest in Australian art that would not be equalled in England for over fifty years. Since 1898, a number of exhibitions of Australian art with a national focus have been staged in London, most recently the Royal Academy's 2013 Australia show. None of these have matched the 1898 show in terms of volume of work on display or number of artists represented.

Despite its seminal position as the first major exhibition of Australian art to be held overseas, the 1898 show has received little attention from scholars. It is often only a footnote in the major histories of Australian art, including William Moore's The Story of Australian Art (1934) and Bernard Smith's Australian Painting, 1788–1960 (1962), or not mentioned at all, as in the case of Robert Hughes' Art of Australia (1966). Instead, most scholarship on the display and reception of Australian art in London has focused on the 1950s and 1960s, a period when Australian artists enjoyed unprecedented levels of commercial and critical success internationally.

== Bibliography ==
Books

- Gibson, Lisanne (2001). The Uses of Art: Constructing Australian Identities. University of Queensland Press. ISBN 9780702232046.
- Mackenzie, Andrew (1987). Walter Withers: The Forgotten Manuscripts. Mannagum Press. ISBN 9780958779203.
- McQueen, Humphrey (1996). Tom Roberts. Pan Macmillan Australia Pty Ltd. ISBN 9780732908355.

Theses

- Abazi, Petrit (2014). The Exhibition and Reception of Australian Art in London in the Nineteenth Century (Masters Degree). Melbourne, Vic.: University of Melbourne.
