= Women's International Art Club =

Organization for women artists

- Formation: 1900
- Dissolved: 1976
- Type: artists' association
- Formerly called: Paris International Art Club

The Women's International Art Club, briefly known as the Paris International Art Club, was founded in Paris in 1900. The club was intended to "promote contacts between women artists of all nations and to arrange exhibitions of their work", and until it dissolved in 1976 it provided a way for women to exhibit their art work. The first exhibition of the club was held in Paris in 1900, and another at the Grafton Galleries in London in the same year. Members of the club included Elisabeth Frink, Gwen John and Orovida Pissarro.

== History ==
The Paris International Art Club was founded in Paris in 1900, and changed its name to the Women's International Art Club in the same year. The first exhibition of the club was held at the Grafton Galleries in Bond Street, London, in 1900, and was followed by a second show at the same gallery in March and April 1901. Annual exhibitions were held in London until the club dissolved in 1976. Some smaller exhibitions were also held in other parts of Britain and overseas. The membership of the club was international, and there were sections in France, Greece, Holland, Italy and the United States.

The club is thought to have dissolved in 1976, but held an exhibition at Greenwich in 1977.

== Exhibitors ==
The early annual exhibitions were held at the Grafton Galleries. Later the Goupil Gallery was used, and then the galleries of the Royal Society of British Artists. Initially only members of the club could participate in the exhibitions; the club had a limit of 150 members. From 1921, non-members could, for a fee, exhibit one picture each. These exhibitions helped to make up for the lack of opportunity for women to exhibit at mainstream venues such as the Royal Academy.

Eileen Agar, Anthea Alley, Gwen Barnard, Wilhelmina Barns-Graham, Elinor Bellingham-Smith, Ithell Colquhoun, Sonia Delaunay, Dame Elisabeth Frink, Dame Barbara Hepworth, Gwen John, Stanisława de Karłowska, Dame Laura Knight, Lee Krasner, Marg Moll, Orovida Pissarro, Anne Redpath and Dame Ethel Walker were among those who exhibited. A full list of exhibitors from 1900 to 1966 was published in 1981.
