= Mary Stoddard =

Australian artist

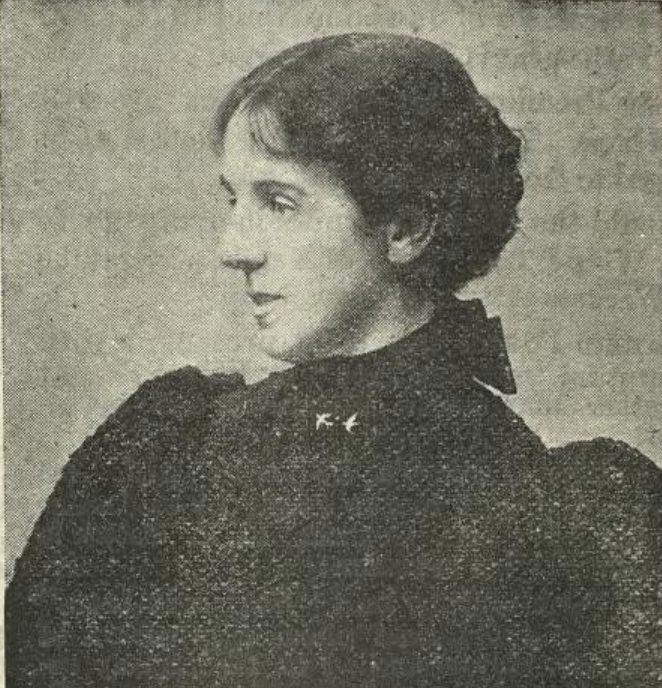
- Born: Mary Devine; 1852; Scotland
- Died: 10 June 1901 (aged 48–49); Kensington, London, UK
- Known for: miniatures, portraits, still lifes

Mary Stoddard (c.1852 – 10 June 1901), was a Scottish-born artist who spent twenty years in Australia and was known for her still life paintings, miniatures and full-size portraits, including two of Sir Henry Parkes.

== Career ==
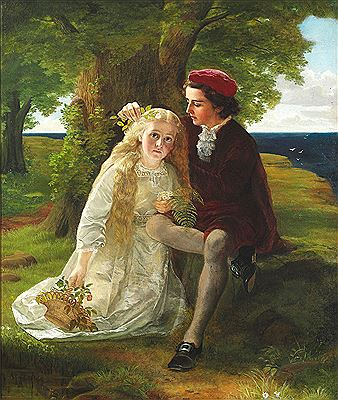
My First Love by Mary Stoddard

Stoddard was the daughter of portrait painter and photographer, Peter Devine and Catherine née Rae. She and her two sisters were taught drawing and painting by their father. In 1875 she married Frederick Wahab Stoddard and the couple moved to New Zealand to take up farming.

Moving to Sydney, Australia in about 1880, Stoddard joined the Art Society of New South Wales and began to enter her artworks in the annual exhibitions they organised. In 1881 she won John Sands' competition for designing a Christmas card and that design and other artworks were displayed at the 1883 exhibition.

Her work is included in the collection of the National Portrait Gallery, State Library of New South Wales and the Art Gallery of New South Wales. Her painting, From earth and ocean, was exhibited at the World's Columbian Exposition in 1893 and also at the Exhibition of Australian Art in London held at the Grafton Galleries in 1898.

Stoddard died in Kensington, London in 1901 following an operation for appendicitis.
