= Gerald Fitzgerald (artist) =

Australian artist (1873–1935)

- Born: 1873
- Died: 1935 (aged 61–62)
- Occupation: Painter

Gerald Fitzgerald (1873–1935) was an Australian artist who painted primarily in watercolour.

He was born in Sydney on 31 March 1873, the seventh of eight children born to Robert David Fitzgerald and his wife Emily (nee Hunt).

He commonly painted scenes of the New South Wales south coast and Blue Mountains, and regularly exhibited with art societies in Australia and New Zealand commencing with the Fourteenth Annual Exhibition of the Art Society of NSW in 1894. In 1898 three of his works were chosen for inclusion in the Exhibition of Australian Art in London.

He is represented in the collections of the Mitchell Library, State Library of New South Wales and the Art Gallery of New South Wales.

Fitzgerald died in Sydney on 8 February 1935.

== Gallery ==
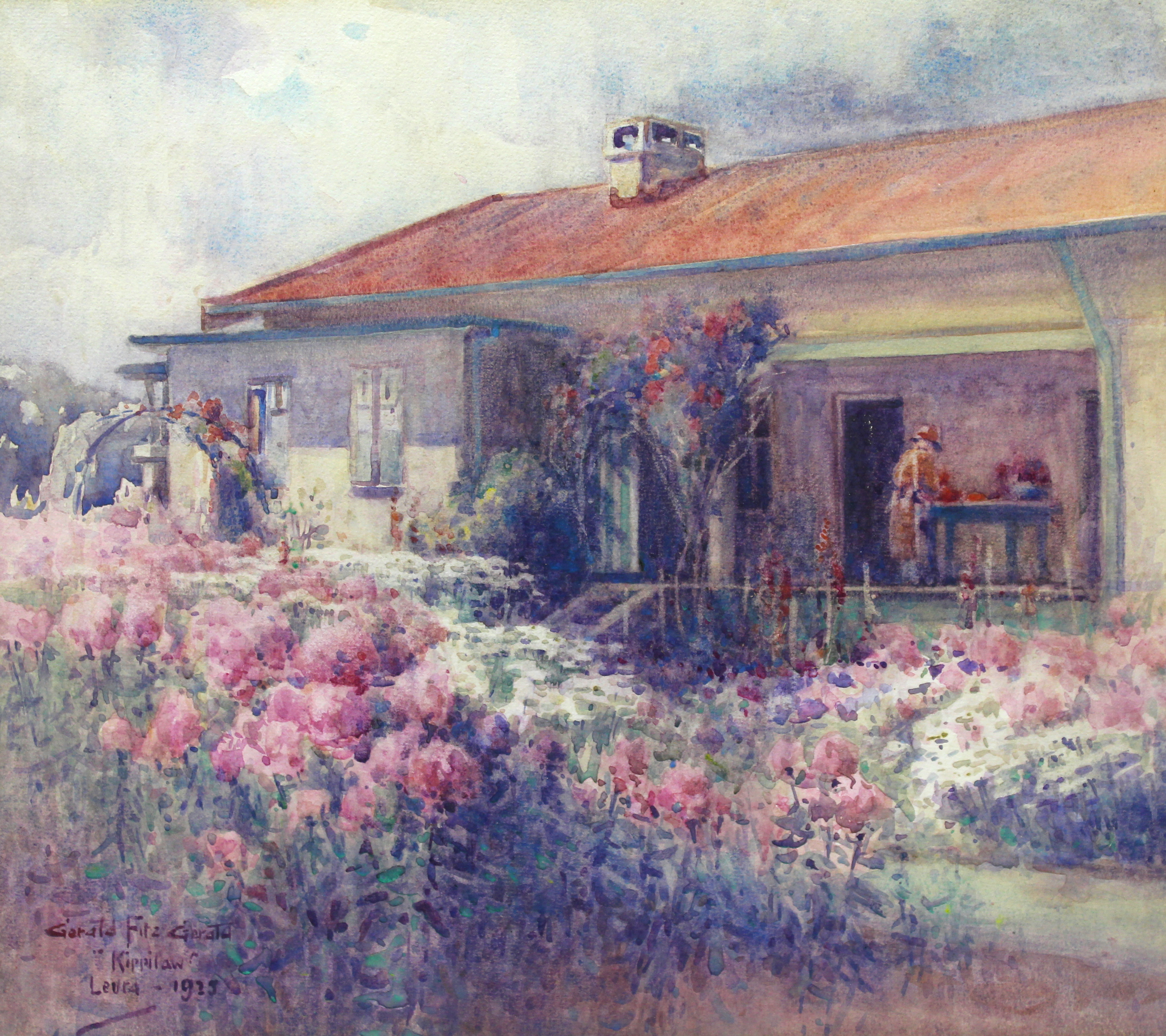
Kippilaw, Leura (1923).

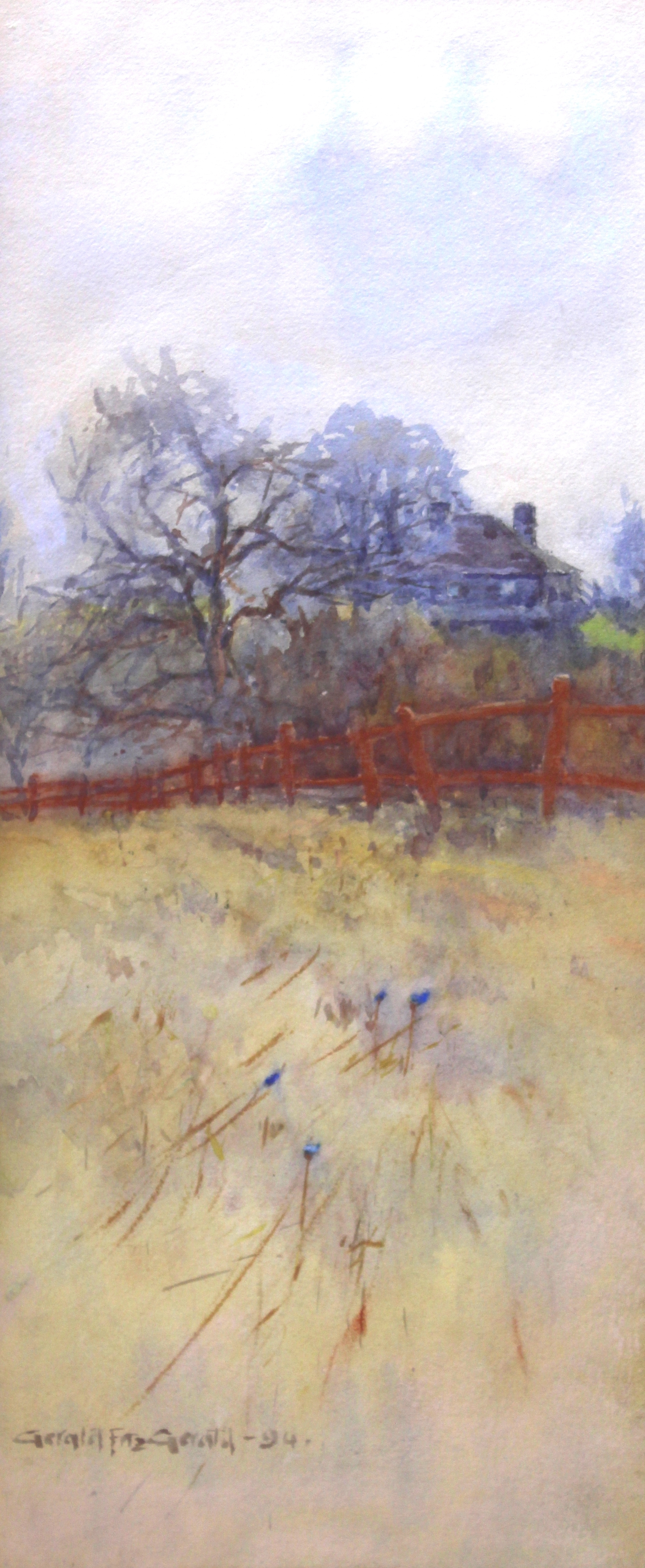
A Lonely Corner (1894).
