= Bath Road, London =

Painting by Camille Pissarro

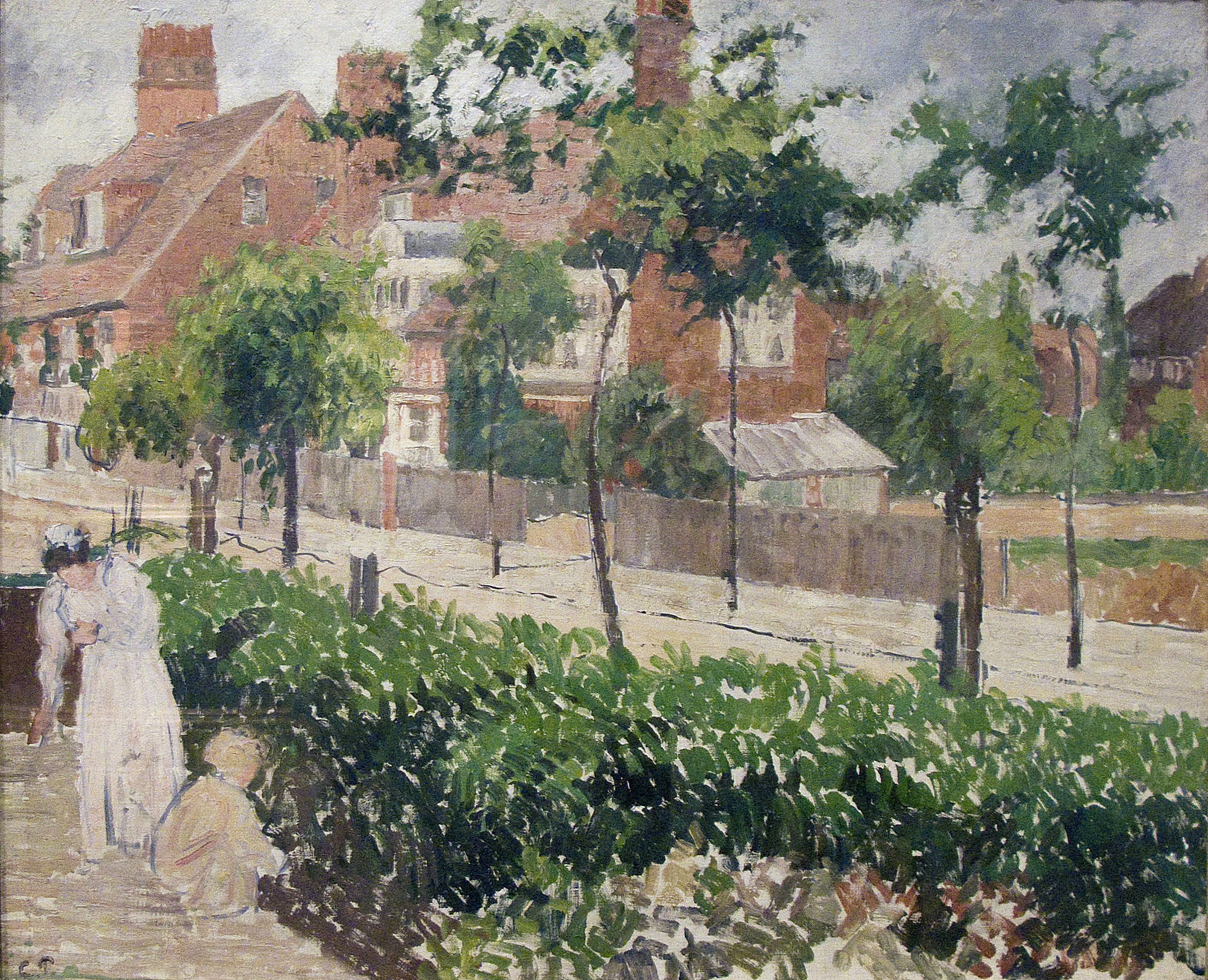
- Artist: Camille Pissarro
- Year: 1897
- Type: Oil on canvas
- Dimensions: 54 cm × 65 cm (21 in × 26 in)
- Location: Ashmolean Museum; Oxford

Bath Road, London is an 1897 Impressionist painting by the French artist Camille Pissarro with a scene of the new garden suburb of Bedford Park near Chiswick, noted for its distinctive Queen Anne Revival architecture. It depicts the view from 62 Bath Road where the artist's son Lucien Pissarro had moved with his family the previous year. The woman and child playing in the front garden are Lucien's wife Esther and daughter Orovida. At this time Camille had returned to a more orthodox form of impressionism.

Today it is on the collection of the Ashmolean Museum in Oxford.

== Bibliography ==
- Bann, Stephen. Art of the Garden: The Garden in British Art, 1800 to the Present Day. Tate Publishing, 2004.
- McConkey, Kenneth. Impressionism in Britain. Yale University Press, 1995.
- Reed, Nicholas. Pissarro in West London: (Kew, Chiswick and Richmond). Lilburne Press, 1997.
