= R. Sidney Cocks =

Australian watercolour artist (1866–1939)

R. Sidney Cocks (1866 – 1939) was an Australian artist who painted primarily in watercolour.

== Biography ==
Robert Sidney Cocks was born in Bathurst on 24 January 1866, the third of eight children born to William Cocks and his wife Margaretta (nee Hare).

Typically, Cocks painted scenes of the NSW south coast and Blue Mountains and regularly exhibited with art societies in Australia and New Zealand. Four of his works were chosen for inclusion in the 1898 Exhibition of Australian Art in London and in 1916 he held his most successful solo exhibition at the Anthony Hordern and Sons Fine Art Gallery in Sydney. He is represented in the collection of the Art Gallery of New South Wales.

He died in Sydney on 10 August 1939.

== Gallery ==
The Bush Creek (not after 1919).
