= W. Lister Lister =

Australian painter (1859–1943)

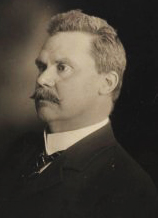
- Born: 27 December 1859; Manly, Sydney
- Died: 6 November 1943 (aged 83); Sydney

William Lister Lister (27 December 1859 – 6 November 1943) was an Australian painter who specialized in landscapes. He was awarded the Wynne Prize seven times. He was also a recipient of a federal government prize for his painting of the federal capital site at Canberra. In some sources the two Listers are hyphenated.

== Biography ==
At the age of eight he moved with his parents to Yorkshire, England; where his father was born. There, he studied at Bedford School, then spent a year in Paris studying art. While there, his father changed the family name from Buttrey to Lister by deed poll. From 1876 to 1880, he studied mechanical engineering at the College of Science and Arts and the Fairfield Engineering Works, both in Glasgow, after which he became a ship's engineer. While studying, he joined the St. Mungo Art Club, founded by a Scottish cartoonist known as Cynicus, and was soon exhibiting at the Royal Scottish Academy, aged only seventeen.

After four years at sea as a ship's engineer, he settled in London in 1884, where he began painting professionally as well as teaching. During his stay there, he exhibited at the Royal Society of British Artists, the Royal Institute of Oil Painters and several others. He returned to Sydney in 1888 where he began producing the seascapes and coastal scenes for which he is best known. He joined the Royal Art Society of New South Wales, and remained with that organization when several artists broke away to form the "Society of Artists, Sydney" in 1907. During this time, he also became a trustee of the National Art Gallery of New South Wales and served as vice-president from 1919 until his death.

In 1898 he had a successful showing at the Exhibition of Australian Art in the Grafton Galleries, London. That same year, he received his first Wynne Prize. In 1899, he married Bessie Enid Jenkins, a divorcée. He was a regular exhibitor at Anthony Hordern's art gallery from 1919 to 1940. Margaret Preston cited him as an early influence. He was known for his preference for very large canvases.

He was struck by a taxi cab driver in Mosman; suffering severe head injuries from which he died a few hours later. In his obituary in the Sydney Morning Herald they made note of the fact that the driver was a woman. He was survived by a daughter. His wife had predeceased him in 1935.

== Selected paintings ==
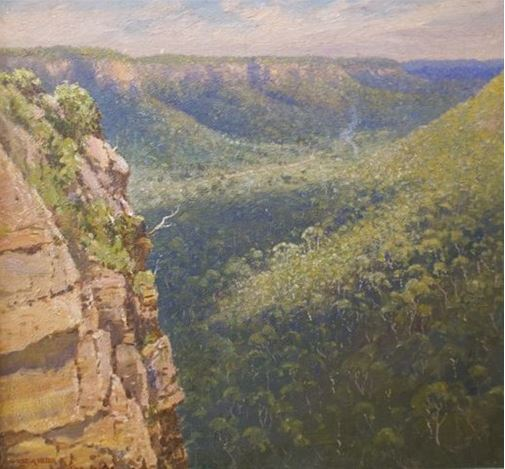
The Blue Mountains

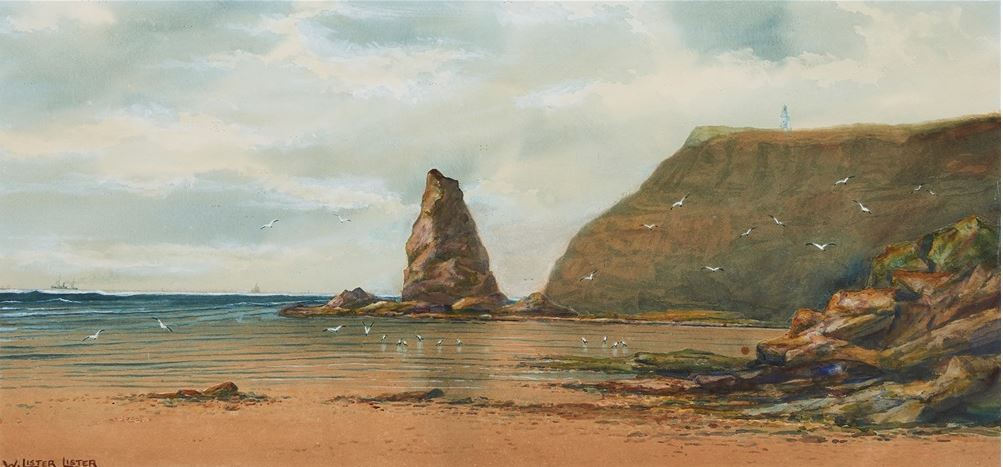
Cape Schenk, Mornington Peninsula

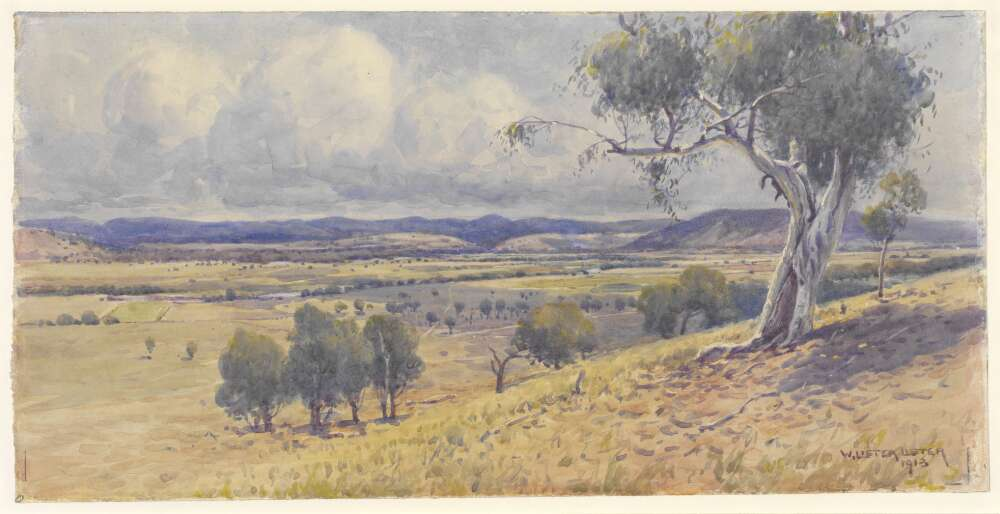
The Federal Capital site

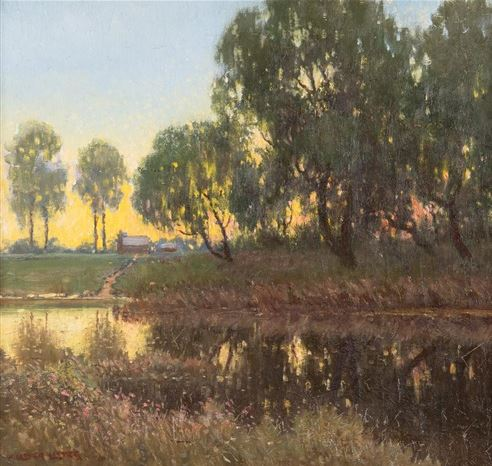
Twilight River Scene

== Wynne Prize awards ==
- 1898 – The Last Gleam
- 1906 – The Golden Splendour of the Bush
- 1910 – Mid Song of Birds and Insects Murmuring
- 1912 – Sydney Harbour
- 1913 – Federal Capital Site
- 1917 – Windswept Marshes
- 1925 – Track through the Bush
