= The purple noon's transparent might =

Painting by Arthur Streeton

The purple noon’s transparent might
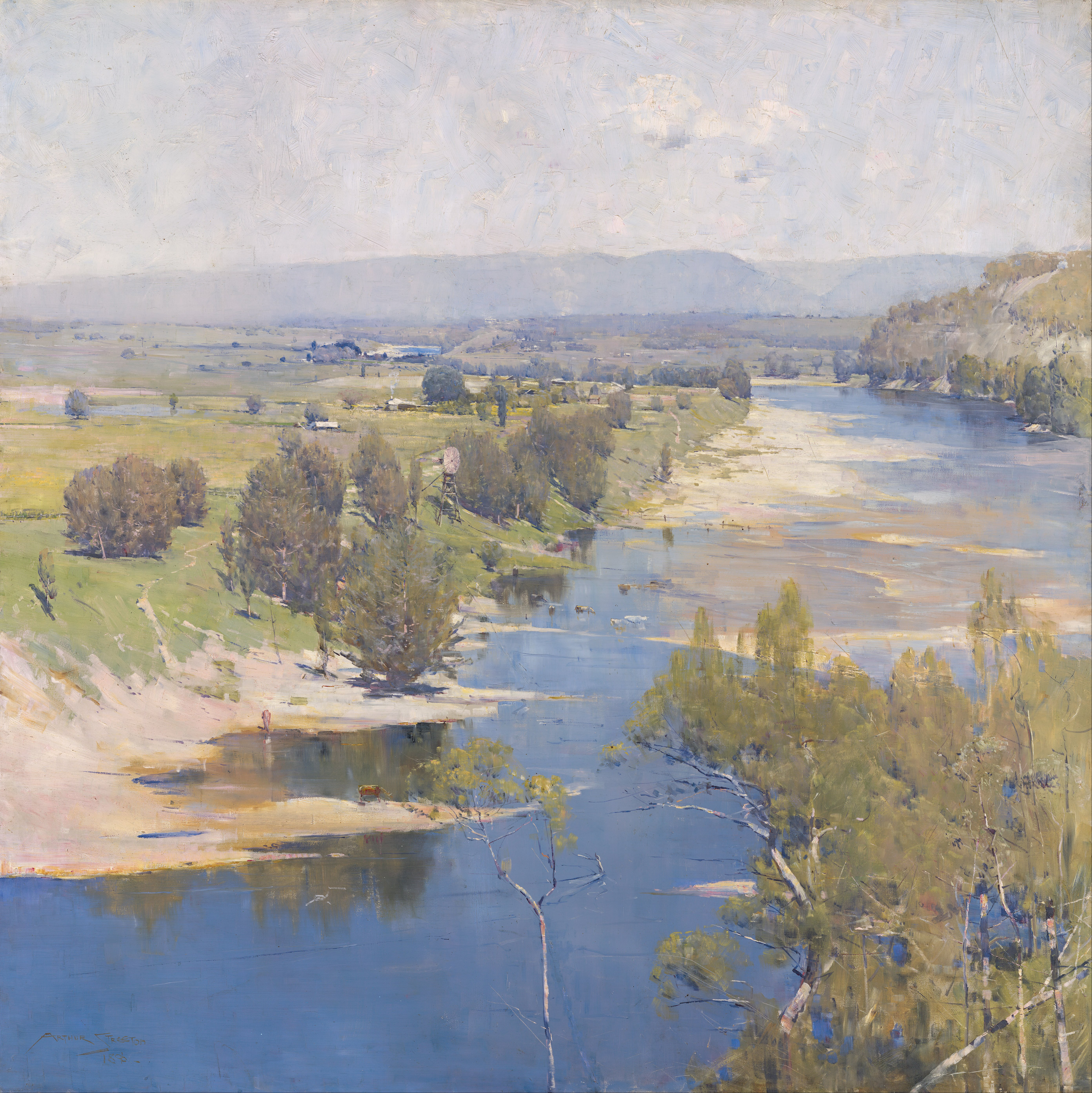
- Artist: Arthur Streeton
- Year: 1896
- Medium: Oil on canvas
- Dimensions: 123.0 cm × 123.0 cm (48.4 in × 48.4 in)
- Location: National Gallery of Victoria; Melbourne

The purple noon's transparent might is an 1896 oil on canvas landscape painting by Australian artist Arthur Streeton. The painting depicts the Hawkesbury River in New South Wales, looking toward the Blue Mountains. The work's title was taken from the poem Stanzas Written in Dejection, near Naples by Percy Bysshe Shelley.

Streeton painted the work in two days while sitting on a ledge above the trees in the hot summer; Streeton claimed the temperature exceeded 108 °F (42 °C) in the shade. Streeton later recalled that he painted in "a kind of artistic intoxication with thoughts of Shelley in my mind. My work may perish but I must work so as to go on".

Every touch here is sure and relevant of character. There is no painting into wet colour, no fumbling with the indefinite, yet in that precision of touch there dwells a mystery of value and light more profound than any romantic formula for the evasion of drawing ... Who but Streeton, gazing up the Hawkesbury River from the terrace across those far-stretched plains, could have imagined what he saw? To divine the possibilities of a picture, its shapes and lighting, its character and composition in that wide field, required the intuition of genius.

— Lionel Lindsay,

The painting was included in the 1898 Exhibition of Australian Art in London where a contemporary reviewer claimed it "would hold its own in any London gallery".

The work was acquired by the National Gallery of Victoria in Melbourne in 1896 and remains part of its collection.
