= Orovida Camille Pissarro =

British artist (1893–1968)

Orovida
- Self-portrait, age 20; Oil on canvas; 39.5 x 32 cm.
- Born: Orovida Camille Pissarro; 8 October 1893; Epping, UK
- Died: 8 August 1968 (aged 74)
- Education: Lucien Pissarro, Walter Sickert
- Known for: Painting, Printmaking

Orovida Pissarro (8 October 1893 – 8 August 1968), known for most of her life as Orovida, was a British painter and etcher. For most of her career she distanced herself from the Impressionist and Post-Impressionist styles of her father, Lucien Pissarro and grandfather, Camille Pissarro, in favour of a technique influenced by Chinese and other Asiatic art; but in the last quarter of her career developed a manner which drew on both traditions.

== Early life and studies ==
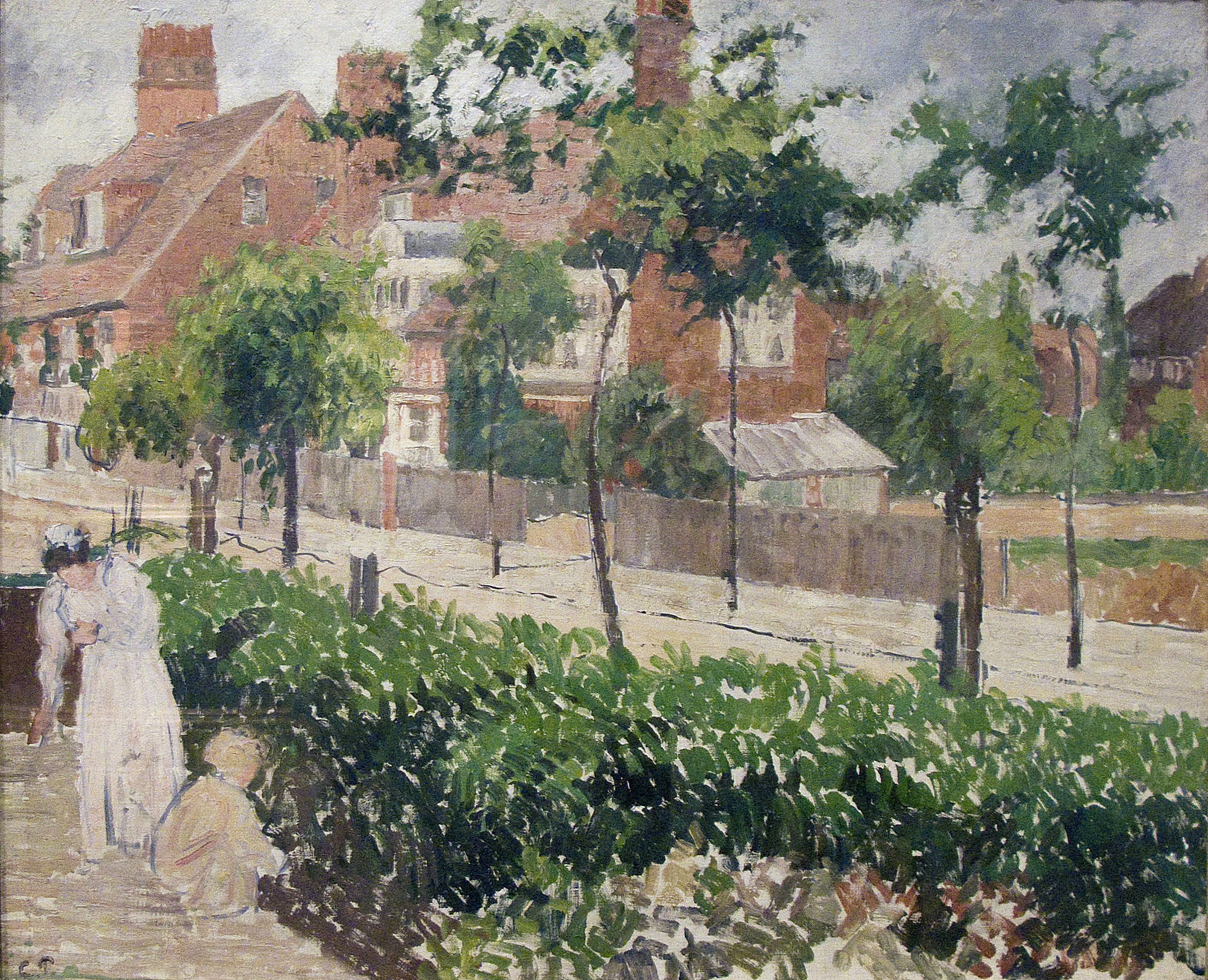
Orovida with her mother in the 1897 painting Bath Road, London by her grandfather Camille Pissarro

Orovida Camille Pissarro was born in Britain on 8 October 1893 in Epping, Essex. She would live primarily in London throughout her life. She was the only child of the French artist Lucien Pissarro, who had settled in Britain in 1890, and his wife, Esther (née Bensusan). Orovida was named after Esther's aunt. The list of artists in Orovida's family is headed by her grandfather, Camille Pissarro, the Impressionist. Her father Lucien, Camille's eldest son, was a painter, printmaker and wood engraver. Her uncles, including Georges Henri Manzana Pissarro, Félix Pissarro, and Ludovic Rodo Pissarro, as well as other relatives, were also artists. She was of Portuguese-Jewish descent.

Orovida displayed her talent at a young age. Lucien said that it was "in her blood". Drawings by the five-year-old Orovida earned praise from her renowned grandfather. Orovida studied oil painting with her father during her teens, becoming proficient in the Impressionist style. As seen in her Self-portrait, Lucien had limited her palette to using only five colours.

Her mother, who had artistic training herself, believed that art was a financially insecure profession, and insisted that Orovida study music. But the daughter's interest in etching, with its prospects for commercial illustration, helped to assuage her mother's fears.

In 1913 Orovida briefly studied with Walter Sickert, before renouncing formal art training.

== Early works ==
Orovida never was a part of Britain's mainstream art movements. She became the first female professional artist in the Pissarro family, and the family's first artist of her generation.

In 1921 she and French artist Marie Laurencin exhibited in a joint exhibition.

A 1924 British Museum exhibition of Chinese painting had a great influence on her artistic sensibilities. Despite her father's disappointment, Orovida, in her 20s, abandoned Impressionism and developed an unusual decorative style inspired by Chinese as well as Japanese, Persian and Indian art. This was partly due to a desire to distinguish herself from her family's strong Impressionist legacy. She further accomplished this by dropping her last name, wishing to be known simply as Orovida for the rest of her life. (Her uncle Georges Henri Manzana Pissarro, similarly, had obfuscated his name, signing his work simply with his grandmother's maiden name, Manzana.) Despite distancing of herself from the family's fame, she remained proud of the Pissarro legacy.

Her spurning of Impressionism was more than just distancing herself from the Pissarros. She considered Western art to be in competition with photography, while Eastern art was more suited to her independent nature. She never visited the Far East; her inspiration came solely from the works she had seen in museums and elsewhere.

Orovida painted with thin washes of gouache or tempera on silk, linen, paper, and gold leaf. Her paintings as well as her etchings depict primarily Asian subject matter. Her most frequent subjects were animals, especially tigers and horses, which she depicted in a decorative, Asiatic, stylised, linear manner. Another favourite subject was Mongolian horsemen hunting wild animals; others included Persian princes and African dancers.

== Later years ==
For the last quarter century of her life, after her father's death in 1944, Orovida resumed oil painting, with a marked shift in style and choice of subject. Her work became more naturalistic and somewhat more akin to the Pissarro tradition. She melded her Asiatic leanings with a more substantial European look. The result has been compared to dry fresco. Her subject matter during this period includes portraits of family and friends, royalty, and especially a variety of cats from domestic to wild.

Orovida was a prolific printmaker, producing about 8,000 impressions from 107 etched plates. In a 2001 book, her etchings and family connections are assessed: "Her original, craftsmanlike, modern decorative prints would have earned her a fine reputation regardless of such connections but would not likely have drawn as much attention."

Her mother had established the Pissarro family archive at the Ashmolean Museum in Oxford, and Orovida played a significant role in developing it.

Orovida never married.

She died on 8 August 1968. In 1969 the Ashmolean Museum put on a memorial show of her paintings, etchings, and drawings. Another posthumous exhibition, Three Generations of the Pissarro Family, was held at the Leicester Galleries. She had participated in a show of that same name in 1943.

Her work may be seen in many prominent collections in Britain, including the British Museum and Victoria and Albert Museum in London, and the Ashmolean Museum in Oxford, and in the United States of America, including the Cleveland Museum of Art, Museum of Fine Arts, Boston, and San Diego Museum of Art.

== Sources ==
- Lang, Kurt; Lang, Gladys Engel (2001). Etched in Memory: The Building and Survival of Artistic Reputation. Urbana: University of Illinois Press. ISBN 0-252-07028-3.
