= Grafton Galleries =

Art gallery in Mayfair, London

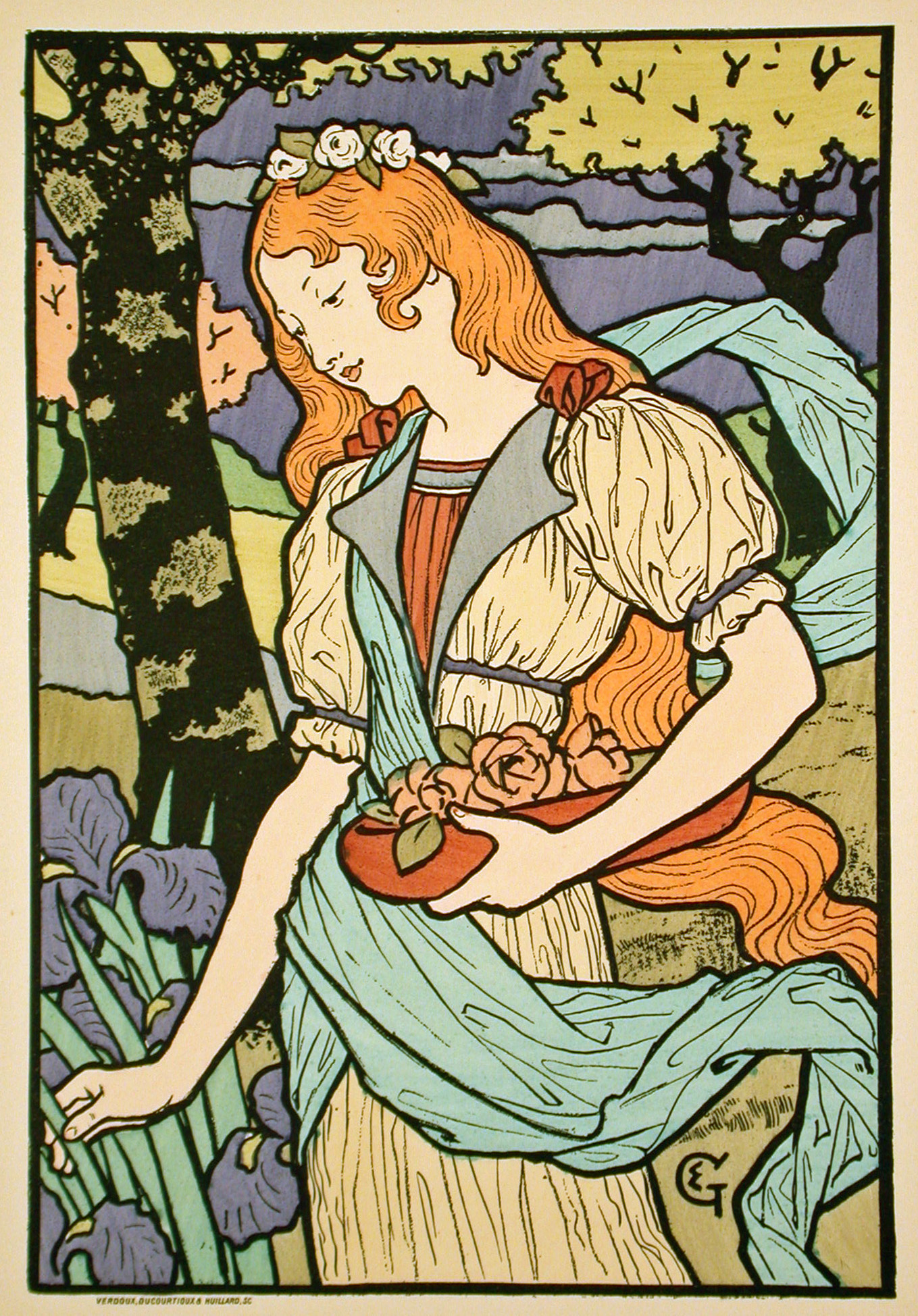
- Eugène Samuel Grasset (25 May 1845 – 23 October 1917), poster for an exhibition of French decorative art at the Grafton Galleries, 1893
- Formation: 1893 or earlier
- Dissolved: 1930s
- Type: Art gallery
- Location(s): 8 Grafton Street, London; Bond Street, London
- Coordinates: 51.51°N 0.1437°W
- Manager: Francis Gerard Prange
- Secretary: Henry Bishop
- Parent organization: Grafton Galleries Co Ltd

The Grafton Galleries, often referred to as the Grafton Gallery, was an art gallery in Mayfair, London. The French art dealer Paul Durand-Ruel showed the first major exhibition in Britain of Impressionist paintings there in 1905. Roger Fry's two famous exhibitions of Post-Impressionist works in 1910 and 1912 were both held at the gallery.

== History ==
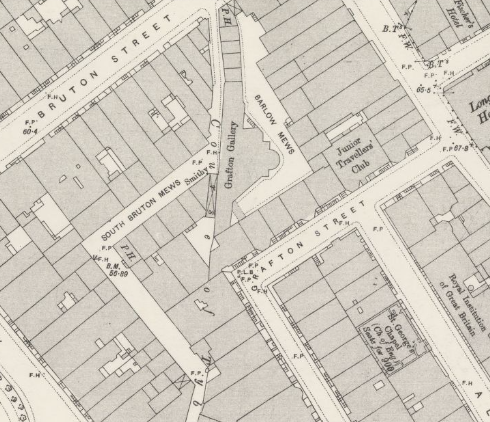
Location of Grafton Galleries, 1894

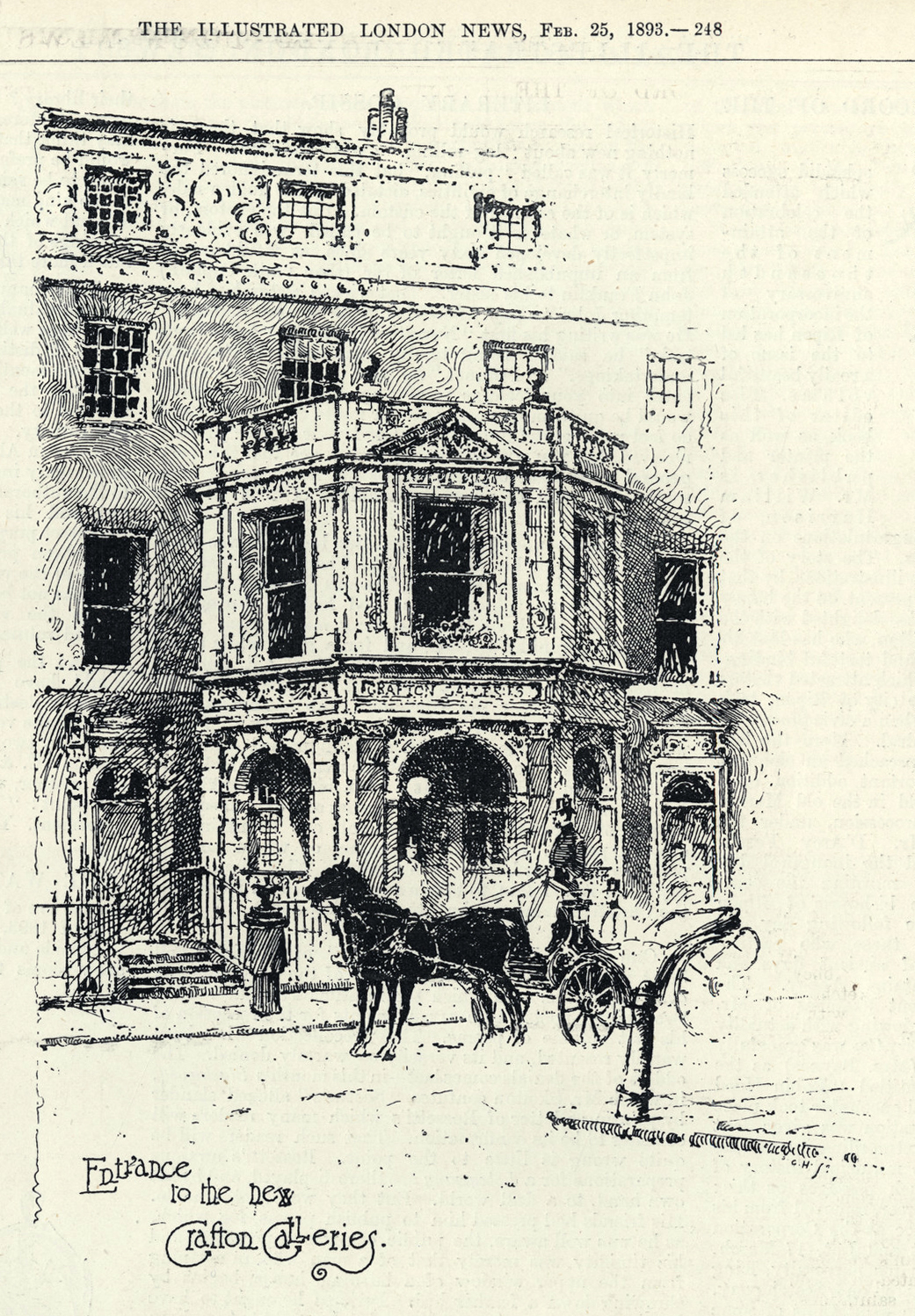
The Grafton Street entrance to the Grafton Galleries, The Illustrated London News, 25 February 1893

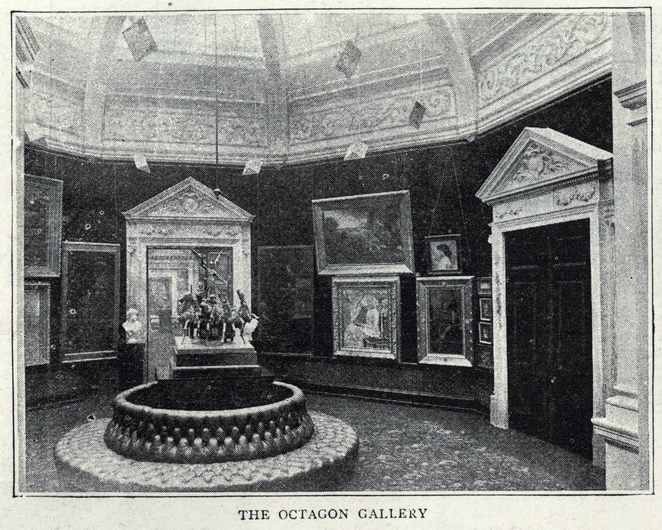
The Octagon Gallery at the Grafton Galleries, The Graphic, 25 February 1893

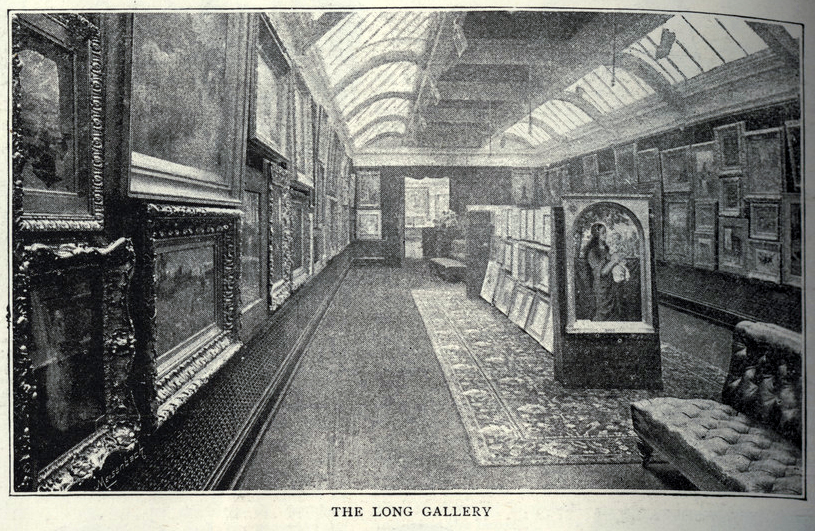
The Long Gallery at the Grafton Galleries, The Graphic, 25 February 1893

The date of foundation of the Grafton Galleries is not certain; some sources give 1873, when it had an address in Liverpool. The gallery was incorporated in London on 16 June 1891, and opened in February 1893 at 8 Grafton Street, with an extensive suite of rooms extending to Bruton Street. (The address was usually given as Grafton Street–Bond Street). The building was designed by John Thomas Wimperis (1829–1904) and William Henry Arber (1849–1904). The first manager was Francis Gerard Prange.

By the early 1900s Venant Benoist, a French-born caterer working in Piccadilly, was the manager, and the buildings were let out for receptions, dinners, concerts and dances. The downstairs banqueting hall, hung with the famous groups of the Dilettante Society painted by Sir Joshua Reynolds, was described by The Times as "one of the most beautiful dining rooms in London".

From 1905 or earlier, Roger Fry was an advisor to the gallery; he asked William Rothenstein to advise him on exhibition content.

In 1930 a Mr Hurcomb of Piccadilly bought the lease and converted the premises into an auction house, but it was still occasionally used for exhibitions until around 1936. The building was damaged in the Second World War and not restored.

== Exhibitions ==
The first London exhibition of the Grafton Galleries opened on 18 February 1893. Despite many ups and downs, the Galleries were still in use in 1936.

In 1894 Fair Women – which according to Meaghan Clarke was the Victorian equivalent of a contemporary blockbuster exhibition – featured historical and contemporary portraits of 'fair' women. Takings over the run of the show reached £8,000.

The most celebrated exhibitions held there were Paul Durand-Ruel's Impressionist show of 1905, and the two Post-Impressionist exhibitions put on by Roger Fry: Manet and the Post-Impressionists in 1910–11, and the Second Post-Impressionist Exhibition of 1912.

Exhibitions held at the gallery include:

- 1893, February: First exhibition, consisting of paintings and sculpture, by British and foreign artists of the present day
- 1893, May: Second exhibition, consisting of the third exhibition of the Society of Portrait Painters, by British and foreign artists of the present day
- 1893, November–December: First exhibition of French artists in decorative art
- 1894: Fair women, loan exhibition of English portraits
- 1894: Fourth exhibition of Grafton Gallery, including a retrospective exhibition of work of Albert Moore, and a general collection of British and foreign works
- 1895: Winter exhibition of the works of old Scottish portrait painters, with a selection of the pictures of John Thomson of Duddingston and a collection of old Scottish silver and weapons
- 1895: Fair children, loan exhibition of English portraits
- 1896: Sixth exhibition of the Society of Portrait Painters
- 1896: Pictures representing the loss of Sir John Franklin's expedition to the North Pole, painted by Julius von Payer
- 1896, January–March: A loan collection of modern pictures, chiefly of the Barbizon and Dutch schools, with a collection of 200 original drawings by Paul Renouard and others
- 1896, April: Charles Sedelmeyer's fine art exhibition
- 1897: Exhibition of dramatic and musical art
- 1897: Society of Miniaturists exhibition
- 1897: Seventh exhibition of the Society of Portrait Painters
- 1897: Summer exhibition of members' work, Society of Miniaturists
- 1897, January: Exhibition of the works of Ford Madox Brown
- 1898: Catalogue of pictures which belong to 68, Princes Gate
- 1898: Collection of pictures by Old Masters formed by David Sellar
- 1898: The Gentlewoman photographic competition, exhibition of prize pictures
- 1898: Eighth exhibition of the Society of Portrait Painters
- 1898, April–May: Exhibition of Australian Art in London
- 1898, June: Bibliotheca Lindesiana, manuscripts and examples of metal and ivory bindings exhibited to the Bibliographical Society, from the Earl of Crawford's collection
- 1899: Siegfried Bing, 1838–1905
- 1899, January: Vasily Vereshchagin exhibition: Napoleon I, 1812, from a sketch made by an eye-witness
- 1899, October–December: Exhibition of modern French art, with a representative collection of the artistic work of Louis Tiffany, of New York
- 1900: Fourteenth exhibition of the Ridley Art Club
- 1900: Ninth exhibition of the Society of Portrait Painters
- 1900, summer: Exhibition of a special selection from the works by George Romney, including a few portraits of Emma, Lady Hamilton by other artists
- 1900, December: Exhibition of a second selection from the works by George Romney, including a few portraits of Emma, Lady Hamilton, by other artists
- 1901: Exhibition of South African pictures by R. Gwelo Goodman
- 1901: Exhibition of works by Willi Wolf Rudinoff (an alias of Wilhelm Morgenstern), including examples in oil, water-colour, etching, and dry point
- 1901, March–April: Women's International Art Club, second annual exhibition
- 1902: Exhibition of the works of Emil Fuchs
- 1902: Works by the late Archibald Stuart Wortley, founder and president of the Society of Portrait Painters
- 1902: Portraits by the late Benjamin Constant, and one hundred pencil studies by Violet Manners, Marchioness of Granby
- 1902, March: Women's International Art Club, third annual exhibition
- 1902, November: Works by Emil Fuchs, the designer of the King Edward VII Coronation Medal and the King's head on the new postage stamps
- 1903, January: Women's International Art Club, fourth annual exhibition
- 1903, March: Modern Celtic ornament as applied to gold and silver plate, pewter, jewelry, carpets, garden pottery, sundials, etc.
- 1903, May: Bijoux et objets d'art exposés par M. René Lalique
- 1903, May–July: French masters exhibition
- 1904, January: Women's International Art Club, fifth annual exhibition
- 1904, December: Women's International Art Club, sixth annual exhibition
- 1905, January–February: pictures by Eugène Boudin, Paul Cézanne, Edgar Degas, Édouard Manet, Claude Monet, Berthe Morisot, Camille Pissarro, Pierre-Auguste Renoir and Alfred Sisley, exhibited by Paul Durand-Ruel and Sons, from Paris
- 1905: Annual exhibition of the Society of Miniaturists
- 1905, March: Exhibition by Emil Fuchs
- 1905, May: Exhibition of a selection from the collection of the late James Staats Forbes, including a few works by Jean-Baptiste-Camille Corot, Charles-François Daubigny, Narcisse Virgilio Díaz, Jean-François Millet, Jozef Israëls, Anton Mauve, one of the Maris brothers, and other artists
- 1905, December: Women's International Art Club, seventh annual exhibition
- 1906: Munich fine art exhibition
- 1906, January: Eighth exhibition of the Arts and Crafts Exhibition Society
- 1906, July: International Congress of Architects in London
- 1906, December: Women's International Art Club, eighth annual exhibition
- 1907: Exhibition of paintings and sketches of the Polar regions by Aleksandr Borisov of St. Petersburg
- 1907: Exhibition of works by members of the Société des aquarellistes français and the Société des peintres de la marine
- 1907, November–December: Special exhibition, United Arts Club
- 1908, January: Women's International Art Club, ninth annual exhibition
- 1908, February–March: Fourth exhibition of the United Arts Club
- 1908, April: Indian princes, Kew Gardens, Italian landscapes, and other pictures
- 1908, May–July: Exhibition of paintings by Joaquín Sorolla y Bastida
- 1908, October–November: The Franco-British Art Association, joint exhibition of Frits Thaulow, Hippolyte Camille Delpy, Arsène Chabanian
- 1908, December: Georges Petit of Paris, second annual London salon of original etchings
- 1908: Pictures and drawings in the National Loan Exhibition in aid of the National Gallery Funds
- 1910, April–May: Tenth Annual Exhibition of the International Society of Sculptors, Painters and Gravers
- 1910, May–June: Exhibition of Fair Women; International Society of Sculptors, Painters and Gravers
- 1910: Manet and the Post-Impressionists
- 1911, April–May: Eleventh Annual Exhibition of the International Society of Sculptors, Painters and Gravers
- 1911, June–July: A Century of Art, 1810-1910
- 1912, April–May: Twelfth Annual Exhibition of the International Society of Sculptors, Painters and Gravers
- 1912, June–July: Exhibition of Fair Children
- 1912: Second Post-Impressionist Exhibition
- 1913-14, October-June: Old Spanish Masters
- 1914, October-December: Modern Spanish Art
- 1917, July-August: Canadian Battle Pictures (second exhibition)
- 1921, April–May: The Annual Exhibition of the International Society of Sculptors, Painters and Gravers; Twenty-seventh London Exhibition
- 1922, April–May: The Annual Exhibition of the International Society of Sculptors, Painters and Gravers; Twenty-eighth London Exhibition
- 1936, May, Wedgwood Exhibition

Other artists who exhibited at the gallery include Frank Brangwyn, Alfred Egerton Cooper, John Lavery, William Orpen, Christopher Nevinson, Ben Nicholson, Glyn Philpot, William Bruce Ellis Ranken, Frank Salisbury, John Singer Sargent, James Jebusa Shannon and George Fiddes Watt.

The Ridley Art Club held its annual exhibition at the gallery from 1897 to 1919; the Society of Miniaturists held its annual exhibition there from 1905 until 1926; and the Allied Artists' Association held its annual show in the Grafton Galleries from 1916 to 1920.
