= Workers' Club (Alexander Rodchenko work) =

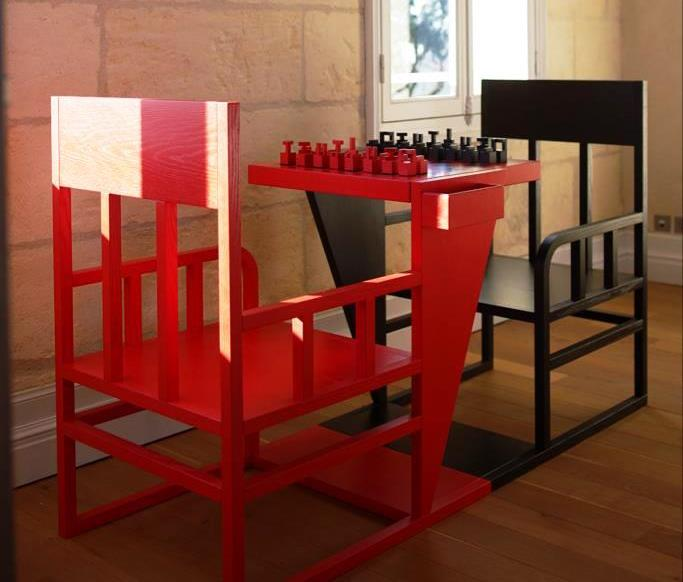
- Designer: Alexander Rodchenko
- Date: 1925
- Made in: Paris, France
- Materials: Wood and plywood
- Style / tradition: Constructivism
- Collection: Original lost

Workers' Club is a work by the Soviet artist, sculptor, and designer Alexander Rodchenko, a founder of constructivism. It was built for the Soviet Pavilion at the Paris World's Fair of 1925. The artist aimed to create an optimal model space for self-education and cultural leisure activities, including playing chess.

The display of the Workers' Club in Paris aroused great interest on the part of both artists and the general public. After the exhibition was over, the furniture set that made up the Workers' Club was gifted to the French Communist Party. Its current whereabouts are unknown, and the set is considered missing.

Since the middle of the 20th century, several reconstructions of individual components of the club, as well as of the complete set, have been realized in various countries. The most complete and accurate copy of the Worker's Club was made in 2021 by experts of the Moscow State Stroganov Academy of Design and Applied Arts from the original designs by Alexander Rodchenko and using the tools and techniques employed in the original.

== History ==
By the mid-1920s, Rodchenko, a founder of constructivism, was already an acclaimed and highly sought-after figure in several artistic fields. In addition to painting, graphics, sculpture, and photography, he proved successful in spatial and interior design, becoming one of the pioneering Soviet designers. Rodchenko combined his multi-faceted creativity with teaching at VKhUTEMAS: in 1923 he was elected chair of the Metalworking Department and, two years later, when the latter was merged with the Woodworking Department to form Metalworking and Woodworking Department – DERMETFAC (Russian: Факультет обработки дерева и металла — ДЕРМЕТФАК), he also chaired that new department.

On the back of his achievements and authority in the country's artistic circles, as well as his good reputation in the eyes of government leaders, Rodchenko was brought in to work on the Soviet Pavilion at the International Exhibition of Modern Decorative and Industrial Arts, held in Paris from late April to late October 1925. The project had great political significance – it was the first time the Soviet Union would participate in such a major international event. Yet the timeline for putting up the Soviet section at the exhibition was very tight, since diplomatic relations with France had only been established in October 1924, six months before the opening of the exhibition.

As a member of the Exhibition Committee and deputy chair of its selection board, Rodchenko played an important role in selecting the design for the Soviet Exhibition Pavilion, with preference going to the project of the avant-garde architect Konstantin Melnikov. Once the competition was over and construction work began, Rodchenko was dispatched to Paris to design the Soviet exposition. It was Rodchenko who came up with the color scheme for the two-story frame pavilion – the contrasting combination of red, white and gray.

== Creation and main characteristics ==
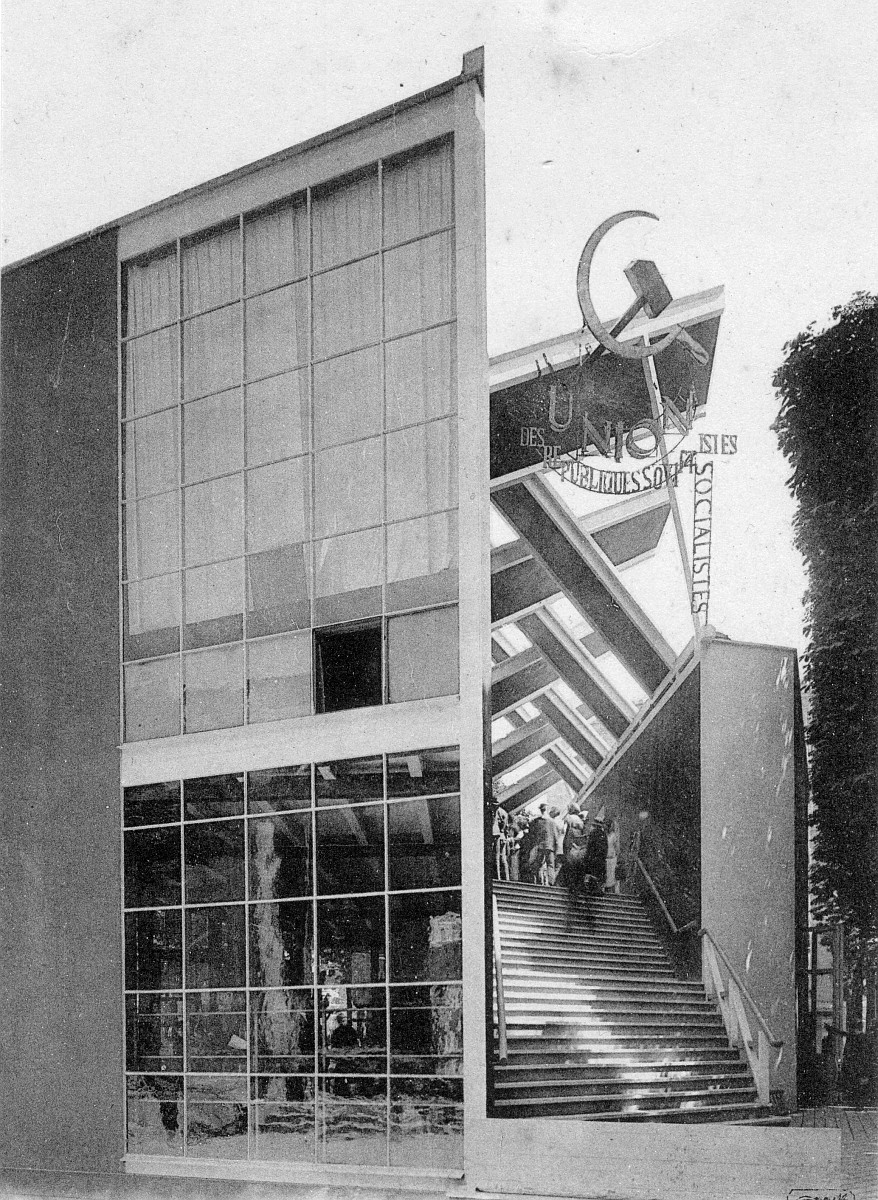
Soviet Pavilion at the 1925 Paris Expo

As a key element of the interior of the Soviet Pavilion, Rodchenko designed what he believed to be an ideal space for collective self-education and cultural pastime of the urban proletariat – a workers' club. Namesake public spaces which Leon Trotsky dubbed ″forges of proletarian mass culture″ were being set up by the thousands in the cities of the Soviet Union at that time, alongside reading cabins in the countryside. Workers' clubs were multifunctional, allowing to hold both propaganda and educational events, show films, put on plays, and initiate industrial workers into fiction and intellectual games. In 1924–28, the Proletkult even published the magazine titled ″Workers' Club″, which served as a conceptual aid for running namesake public spaces.

Rodchenko designed the Workers' Club exhibit with the assistance of his students at the VKhUTEMAS in the weeks leading up to the Paris trip. The design fully embodied the artist's constructivist outlook. The basic principles that guided Rodchenko in the creation of the work were laid out after the exhibition in the Modern Architecture Magazine by his wife and creative associate Varvara Stepanova, who was also a renowned artist and constructivist designer, and who wrote for the magazine under the pseudonym Varst. The key project criteria were not so much aesthetic as practical:

Первое. Экономия в использовании квадратуры пола клубной комнаты и экономия пространства, занимаемого вещью при наибольшей нагрузке, максимальном ее использовании.
Второе. Простота пользования вещью и стандартность вещи при необходимости расширить или увеличить количественно отдельные ее части.

—Varvara Stepanova on the principles of the Workers’ Club
Translation:

Firstly, economical use of the club room square footage and economical use of space occupied by a piece at peak load, i.e. its maximal usage.
Secondly, ease of use of each piece and its conformity to a standard, allowing, if necessary, to expand or quantitatively increase its individual components.

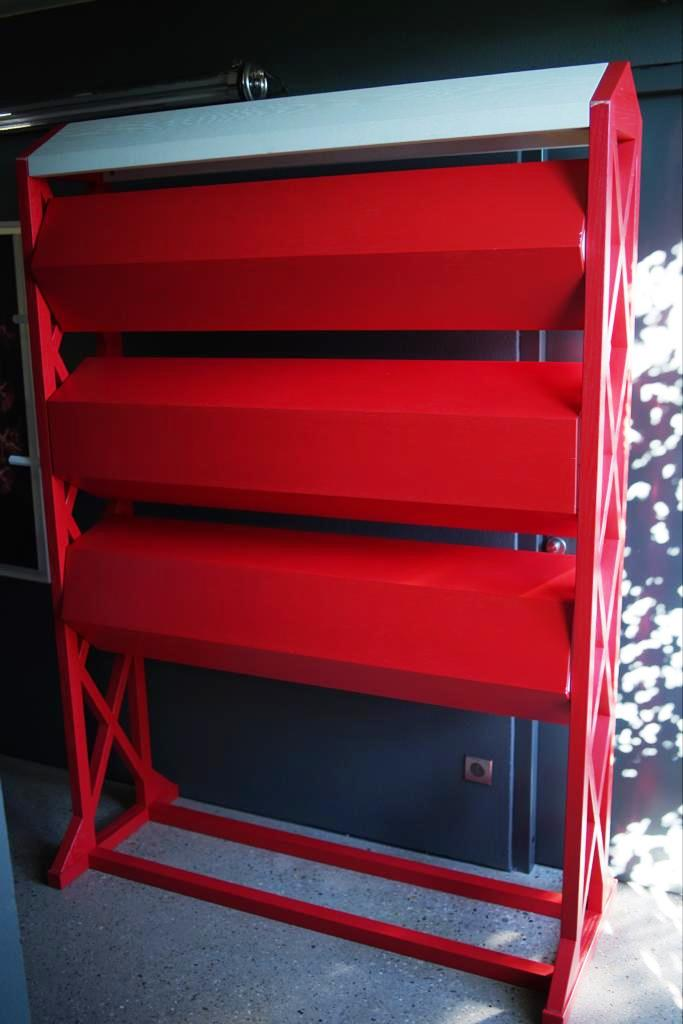
Workers’ Club: stand with rotating hexagonal drums. 2021 reconstruction

All the furnishings of the Workers' Club were decided to be made of wood. In March–April 1925, they were manufactured to designs and sketches brought from Moscow by Rodchenko, at the furniture factory in the Parisian suburb Asnières. However, according to Stepanova's recollections, not all the elements of the original design could be made, due to the tight deadline and a more than modest budget of the Soviet exhibition section.

As Rodchenko intended, all the components of the Workers' Club were extremely compact, devoid of decorative elements, and as functional as possible: most of them had several possible configurations serving various practical purposes. This was especially true for the most important element of the set — the multifunctional convertible unit dubbed ″the living newspaper″ which could be converted depending on the nature of events held at the club: several manipulations taking mere seconds allowed turning this light batten structure with joints into a lectern, a cinema screen or an adjustable-width wall for posters, geographical maps or theatrical scenery.

The multifunctional unit was designed to be placed against a room wall, while two tables occupied the center of the set. One of them, a long table for meetings, writing and reading, was lined with twelve armless chairs with high frame backs with semicircular upper rails. The table consisted of two sections and could be divided into two smaller tables for six persons each. In addition, the folding tabletop allowed to instantly double or triple the table in size.

The second table in the set was the chess table. Rodchenko considered chess an indispensable element of cultural pastime and an important aid to the intellectual development of the proletariat. The chessboard tabletop could be horizontally rotated to change the color of the player at the start of a new game without players having to get up from the table. The two chairs for chess players had armrests, rectangular backs made of four parallel vertical boards with a straight upper rail. The rectangular footings, on which they were mounted, were interlocked exactly under the center of the chess table.

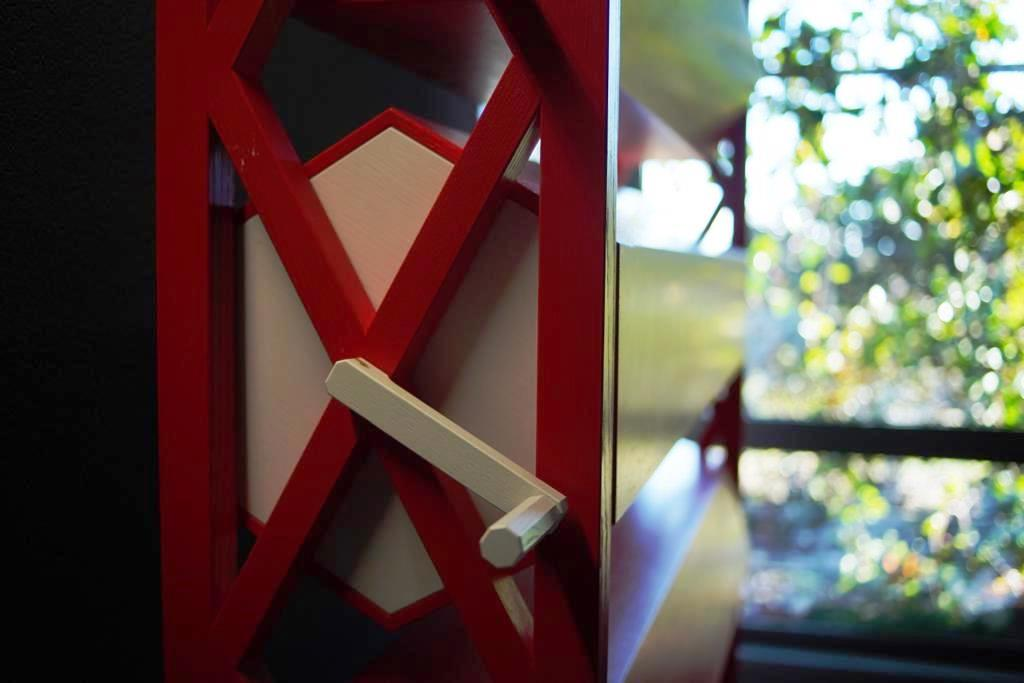
End of the display stand with a handle to rotate the drum. 2021 reconstruction

In addition, the set included two book racks with five rows of slanted surfaces without glazing and drawers in the lower tier, which could be converted into small tables or pedestals. Another element of the interior was a specially designed display stand – its three horizontal hexagonal rotating drums allowed different visuals to be displayed alternately.

The interior was enhanced by Rodchenko's posters on the walls and a large fragment of a photograph of Vladimir Lenin, taken on 16 October 1918, during a walk in the Kremlin courtyard with Vladimir Bonch-Bruyevich, which depicts the first Soviet leader half-turned, at two-thirds height. The space was divided into functional areas, which the artist distinguished by different wall colors and inscriptions: ″Workers' Club. Announcements″, ″Library″, ″Lenin″. Because of the latter inscription, some Western sources list Rodchenko's set as Lenin Workers' Club.

For the color design of the Club Rodchenko used Ripolin enamel paints, which were very popular among European designers of the period. The color scheme consisted of the contrasting red, white, and gray common to the Soviet exhibition pavilion. The only exception Rodchenko made when working on the chess table was to use black for the dark chess pieces, the dark squares on the board, and one of the chairs. The other half of the chess pieces, the squares, and the second chair by the chessboard were painted red.

== Reception and subsequent fate ==
The furnishing of the Workers' Club was not completed until the second month of the Paris Exhibition – on 1 June 1925. During the few days remaining until the official opening of the Soviet Pavilion, the club was frequented by the few Soviet citizens who were in Paris during that period and who used it for its direct purpose – to gather and read. That was fully in keeping with the artist's concept, who from the beginning stressed his desire to create not a mere exhibit, but a functional space truly useful for people.

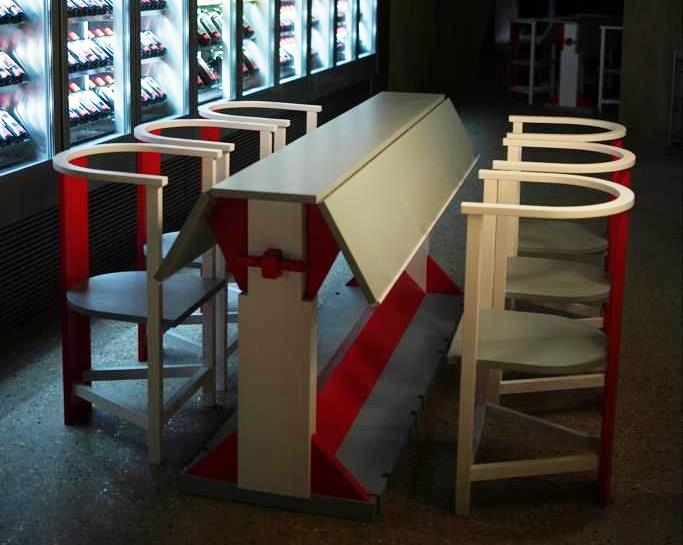
A table section with a folding tabletop, and a set of chairs. 2021 reconstruction

Ну, клуб готов, посылаю снимки. Правда, он такой простой и чистый и светлый, что в нем поневоле не заведешь грязь. Все блестящий риполин, много белого, красного, серого... Каждый день туда забираются русские и читают журналы и книги, несмотря на то, что вход загорожен веревкой...

—From Rodchenko's letter to his wife on 1 June 1925
Translation:

Well, the club is ready – herewith some pictures. Really, it's so simple and neat and bright; you couldn't turn it topsy-turvy even if you wanted to. It's all shiny ripolin, lots of white, red and gray... Every day Russians sneak in here to read magazines and books, even though the entrance is cordoned off...

After its official opening on 10 June, the Soviet Pavilion immediately attracted increased attention from both the creative elite and the general public. Both the exterior and interior of the building were widely regarded as contrasting with the pretentious style of most of the other pavilions – later called Art Deco – and impressed with the originality and novelty of the technical and artistic solutions involved. They were praised in particular by such renowned European artists as Fernand Léger and Le Corbusier. The latter, who himself designed one of the exhibition's largest pavilions, the New Spirit, declared that the Soviet Pavilion was the only one worth seeing. Léger, Pablo Picasso and Theo van Doesburg were also notoriously eager to meet the designer of the Soviet Pavilion, but Rodchenko abstained from meeting with his prominent foreign peers – according to the members of the Soviet delegation, the reasons were his reserve and shyness, as well as his lack of knowledge of foreign languages.

Western critics′ reviews of the Workers′ Club emphasized the mobility and functionality of its components, their convertibility, novel minimalist shapes and the unusual color design. Art historians later noted that Rodchenko's Worker's Club was a flagship of constructivist design, exerting strong influence on the followers of the movement.

An extended report on Rodchenko's design was published by the accredited correspondent of the aforementioned Soviet magazine titled Workers′ Club. The article underscored not only the convenience and efficiency of the set, but also the difference in its reception by the different classes of French society:

По отзывам специалистов, а также и французской прессы, вынужденной отдать должное нашим достижениям, оборудование этого примерного рабочего клуба очень экономно, легко, показательно и подвижно, а главное, построено с расчетом на минимум затрат. Вся обстановка в целом образец удобства и целесообразности...

Помещение рабочего клуба посещалось массой народа; многие смотрели на его оборудование, как на диковинку, иные фыркали, архитекторы и художники рассматривали каждую деталь; но совершенно по-другому смотрели на это рабочие Франции, посещавшие клуб большими группами. Ведь этот клуб — и наш клуб — так формулировал общую мысль один из рабочих и любовно гладил рукой установку для стенной газеты...

—
Translation:

According to experts, as well as the French press compelled to recognize our achievements, the furnishings of this exemplary Workers’ Club are very economical, light, impactful, mobile and, most importantly, highly cost-efficient. The space as a whole is a model of convenience and practicability...

The Workers' Club received hordes of visitors; many looked at its furnishings in amazement, some snorted, the architects and artists explored every detail; but the French workers, who visited the club in large groups, looked at it in a completely different way. After all, ″this club is also our club″, which is how one of the workers articulated the general view, while lovingly striking the wall newspaper unit with his hand...

Rodchenko's work also received official recognition: the Workers' Club was awarded a silver medal at the end of the exhibition. Separate awards of the same level were also given to four of Rodchenko's posters displayed in the club.

After the exhibition was over, the Soviet Pavilion, like most of the other structures erected for the event, was to be dismantled. Instead of transporting the Club back home, the Soviet delegation decided to gift it to the French Communist Party. It is known that for some time Rodchenko's set remained on the PCF premises and was used for its intended purposes. Later, however, its traces were lost and its current whereabouts are unknown.

== Reconstructions ==
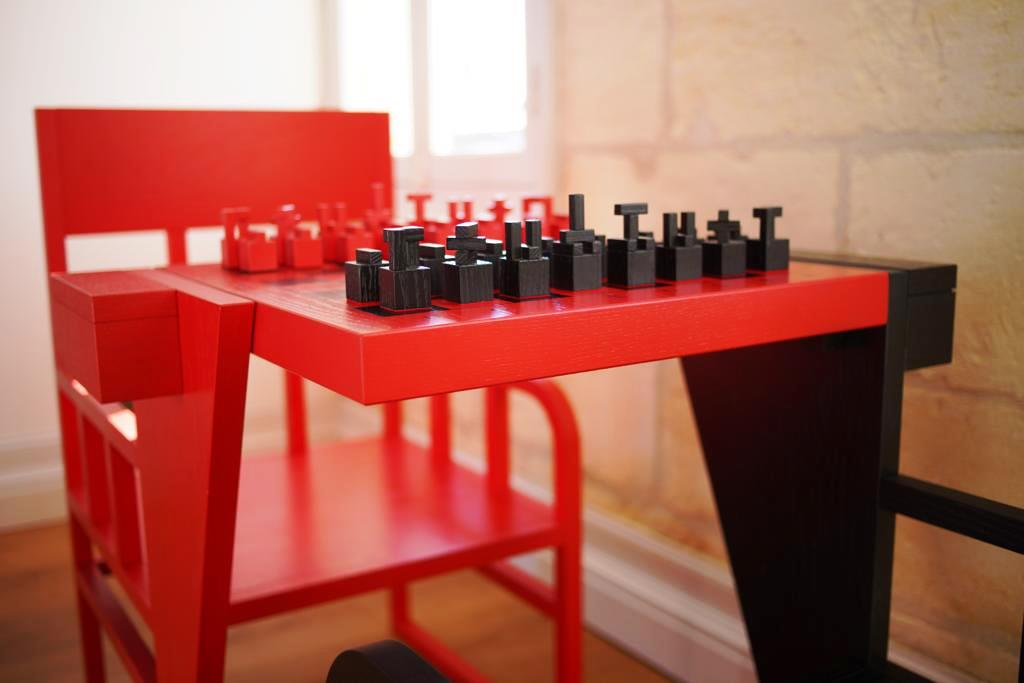
Chess table with chess pieces designed by Alexander Lavrentiev. 2021 reconstruction

Since the middle of the 20th century, when the loss of the Workers' Club became apparent, there have been numerous attempts in various countries – Britain, Spain, the Netherlands, Finland, France, the USSR, and the United States – to fully or partially reconstruct Rodchenko's original set. But despite the undoubted similarity of the reconstructed sets or their individual components to the original, every attempt revealed various discrepancies in terms of proportions, materials, colors and finish.

In 2008, German furniture makers reconstructed the club for the exhibition ″From Plane to Space. Malevich and Early Modernism″, held at the Baden-Baden Kunsthalle. At the end of the exhibition the set was donated to the Russian New Tretyakov Gallery, becoming part of its permanent collection. Compared with all previous reconstructions, it was recognized as the most complete and accurate copy of the club. Later, however, research conducted by Russian experts revealed several differences between the work of German furniture makers and Rodchenko's original. The most important of those differences related to the shades of color and the nuances of the contours of the furniture: in the pieces of furniture made in Germany in 2008, the corners and edges were noticeably rounded, while in Rodchenko's set they were as sharp as possible, even on the inside of the pieces. The latter discrepancy seems particularly significant to art historians since it is precisely the sharp angles and edges that are considered an important element of the constructivist aesthetic. According to the conclusions of experts in Moscow, the difference can be explained at least in part by the fact that the German set was made with contemporary materials and tools – fiberboard processed on CNC machines with circular cutters.

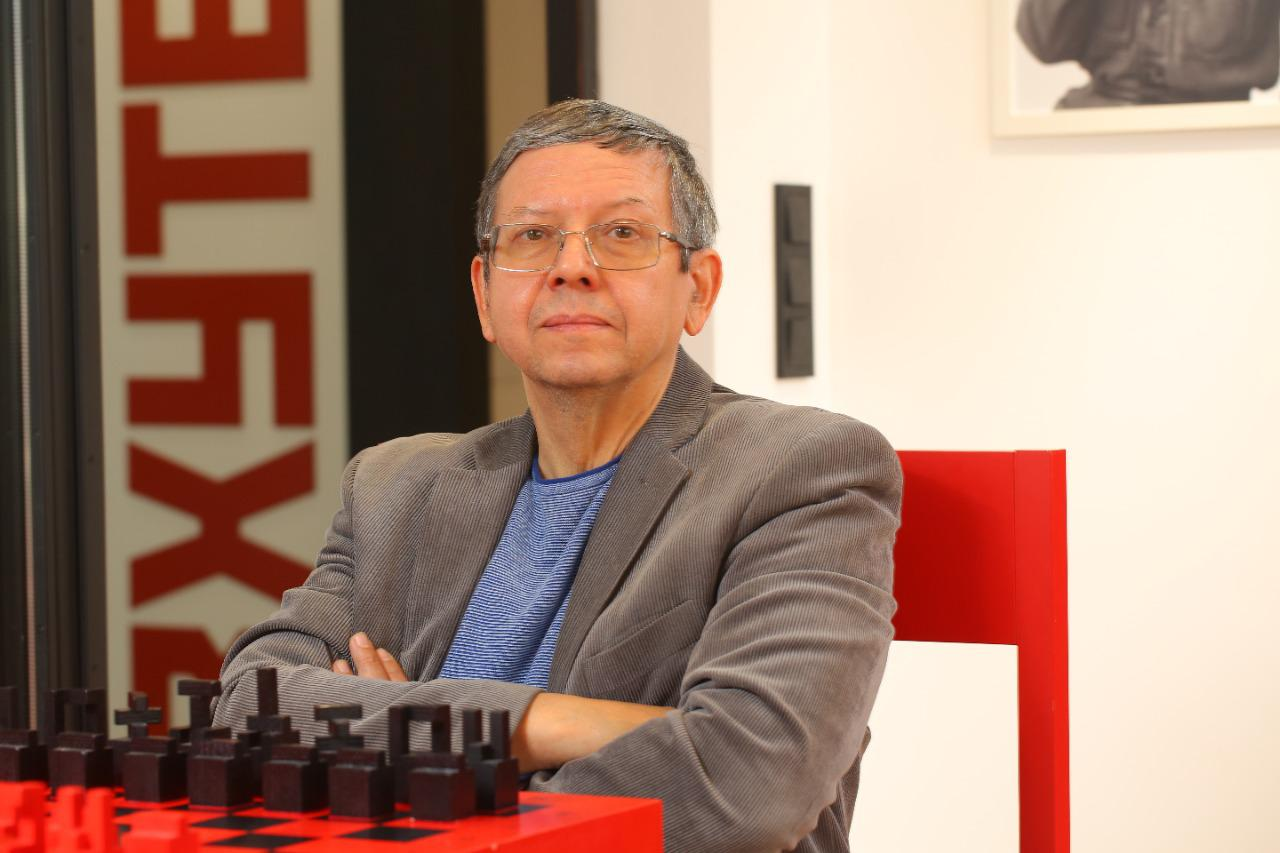
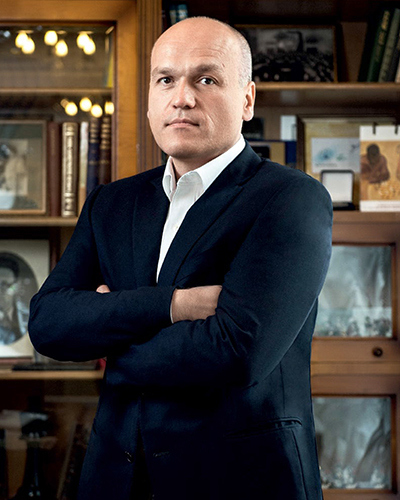
Above: Rodchenko's grandson Alexander Lavrentyev in the reconstructed Workers' Club
Below: President of the Russian Chess Federation Andrei Filatov

In 2021, a complete and most accurate copy of the Workers' Club was made in Moscow for the first time. The reconstruction project was carried out by experts and students of the Furniture Design Department of Moscow State Stroganov Academy of Design and Applied Arts, the successor to the Wood- and Metalworking Department of VKhUTEMAS, which Rodchenko had headed, with the financial and organizational support of Andrey Filatov, President of the Russian Chess Federation and founder of the Art Russe Foundation. The reconstruction was preceded by lengthy research in the course of which Rodchenko's designs and watercolor sketches were studied in their entirety. Some of the designs and sketches have survived in the Department archives, while others – in the family archives of Rodchenko's grandson, Vice-Principal of the Stroganov Academy Alexander Lavrentyev, who took an active part in the reconstruction project. To maximize the approximation to the original, the Stroganov Academy team used only those materials (solid wood and glued plywood), tools and techniques that were available to the makers of the Workers' Club in the mid-1920s. The chess table in the newly reconstructed Club came complete with a set of wooden chess pieces in the constructivist style, designed by Lavrentyev as early as 1976.

The project team was guided by the task not only to recreate Rodchenko's Workers’ Club with utmost accuracy and precision, but also to ensure its future use in accordance with its original practical purpose – not as a mere museum exhibit, but rather as a space for self-education and cultural recreation.

Completed in November 2021, the project produced two copies of the Workers' Club. One of them remained on the premises of the Stroganov Academy, the project executor, where it is used by teachers and students for studying and recreation. The other copy was shipped to France to be housed at the Chateau La Grace Dieu des Prieurs wine estate in Saint-Emilion, designed by the French architect Jean Nouvel. There, it is now also used for its direct purpose – the cultural recreation of the winery workers.
