= American Ethane Company =

Largest producer of ethane in the United States

American Ethane Company, LLC (AEC)
- Company type: Private
- Industry: Oil and gas
- Founded: January 2014
- Headquarters: Houston, Texas, United States
- Area served: North America, China
- Key people: John Houghtaling II co-founder & CEO
- Products: Ethane
- Website: www.americanethane.com

American Ethane Company, LLC (AEC) is the largest producer of ethane in the United States. It is a Houston, Texas, based American petroleum company established in January 2014 with offices in New Orleans. It is privately held with large investments from Russian oligarchs who are close to Vladimir Putin's inner circle.

== Ownership and management ==
As of July 2018, Konstantin Nikolaev, Mikhail Yuriev, and Andrey Kunatbaev have a combined 88% stake in American Ethane and Alexander Voloshin has a secret 2.5% share worth $1.25 million in 2014 under an AV SPV in the remaining 12%. (Note: Alexander Stalevich Voloshin, a foreign official, is a politically exposed person (PEP). His stake in American Ethane is an Offering of Securities Made Without Registration under AV SPV. This allows Russians to invest in China through the United States.) Also in July 2018, Houghtaling confirmed that Alexander Abramov, who is Roman Abramovich's partner in Evraz, is an investor in American Ethane. Beginning in January 2014, Roman Abramovich was an investor with American Ethane but left in April 2017.

John Houghtaling II, a co-founder, is the CEO.

James Glickenhaus and J. M. “Jim” Collingsworth serve on the Board of Directors.

== History ==
In January 2014, Roman Abramovich through his Millhouse LLC, which is a Moscow-based asset management company, signed an agreement at the John Houghtaling II house in New Orleans and made a $50 million investment in the American Ethane Company but backed out in late 2015 after the Russian intervention in Ukraine and the Russian annexation of Crimea because of sanctions against Russia. Nikolaev's investment was pivotal to keep American Ethane from becoming insolvent which would force a bankruptcy. In April 2017, Abramovich recouped $21 million to his Eucla Investments Ltd for the debt owed to Abramovich from Houghtaling of American Ethane.

Since 2015, American Ethane has aggressively increased its market share in China receiving more than 7.2 million tons of ethane per year for power generation in General Electric plants.

Announced on November 9, 2017, during the U.S.-China Business Exchange attended by both U.S. President Donald Trump and General Secretary of the Chinese Communist Party Xi Jinping, the Nanshan Group of China agreed to a $26 billion 20-year trade deal to receive liquid ethane from American Ethane. The agreement occurred in June 2017. China will cracker the ethane into ethylene, which is used to make plastics. The United States is the largest supplier of ethane in the world. Houghtaling stated that his main competition for ethane to China is from Russia and Vladimir Putin.

In 2018, American Ethane began constructing the largest United States export terminal for ethane on the Gulf Coast. The Energy & Minerals Group (EMG), established in Houston by John T. Raymond in 2006, is co-developing the 10 million ton per year ethane port. Construction is to be completed by 2020. When this port is completed, Houghtaling expects to export more than 7.2 million tons of ethane from this port to China annually which is double the total United States exports of ethane in 2017.

As of July 2018, American Ethane has contracts totaling $72 billion over 20 years to export ethane from the United States Gulf Coast to China.

== Lobbyists and campaign contributions ==
From April 2014 to January 2015 Haley Barbour's BGR Group received $220,000 and lobbied through Ed Rogers, Walker Roberts, Lauren Monroe and Erskine Wells for American Ethane, but were replaced in October 2017 with Lindsay Sander from Austin Texas-based Sander Resources and Kyle Ruckert from Louisiana-based Bold Strategies.

From January 1, 2017, to July 28, 2018, American Ethane made numerous political contributions to Conservative Louisiana, Bill Cassidy, Mike Johnson, John Kennedy, Garret Graves, Scalise Leadership Fund, and Pelican PAC.

== Controversies ==
Since at least 20% of the ownership of American Ethane is foreign, American Ethane lobbyists, which is the BGR Group, must declare that they are lobbying for foreign interests; however, the BGR Group has never disclosed this. This disclosure to both Congress and the Department of Justice is required by federal law under the Foreign Agents Registration Act (FARA) and operating as an unregistered agent of foreign interests is a felony offense under FARA, with a penalty of up to five years in prison and a fine of up to $250,000.

Further, the lobbyists for American Ethane, which is registered as a Texas firm, have made large political contributions, which are legal, to influence Louisiana politicians although American Ethane's large expansion and development project is in Texas.

Also, Voloshin, Abramovich or Abramov have never been listed as investors by American Ethane's website nor by its publications although these foreigners have significant interests in American Ethane.

Finally, Konstantin Nikolaev is a partner and close associate of Vladimir Putin's inner circle through Igor Levitin, Alexey Mordashov, Arkady Rotenberg, and Gennady Timchenko.
