= Wendell H. Gauthier =

American attorney

- Born: April 14, 1943; Iota, Louisiana
- Died: December 12, 2001 (aged 58); New Orleans, Louisiana
- Education: Loyola University New Orleans College of Law (JD)
- Occupation: Lawyer
- Years active: 1954-2001
- Known for: Castano v. American Tobacco Company, DOW Corning Breast Implant Litigation, MGM Grand Fire Litigation
- Spouse: Anne Barrios Gauthier
- Children: 3

Wendell H. Gauthier (/ˈɡɪrʃ-ə/; April 14, 1943 – December 12, 2001) was an attorney known for a variety of major class action lawsuits. He is best known for his leading role in Castano v. American Tobacco Company which established that large tobacco companies could be liable for injury to its users. The dramatic case was fictionalized into John Grisham's bestselling novel Runaway Jury and directly led to numerous other "Son of Castano" suits and the $246 billion Tobacco Master Settlement Agreement, the largest settlement in history.

== Early life ==
Wendell Gauthier was raised in Iota, Louisiana, a small town in the Acadiana region of Louisiana. His father was a construction foreman as well as a city councilman and his mother was a school teacher. His father managed Edwin Edward's first political campaign when Wendell was 11 and the two developed a close relationship. Gauthier graduated from Iota High School before earning an undergraduate degree from the University of Southwest Louisiana (now University of Louisiana at Lafayette), where he met his future wife, Anne Barrios. He moved to New Orleans and taught high school, as well as driver's education across the metropolitan area while simultaneously earning his Juris Doctor from the Loyola University New Orleans College of Law. He was the first member of his family to attend college. There he became best friends with Peter Castano whose death would trigger the start of the third wave of Tobacco litigation.

== Legal Practice ==
Gauthier used his unsophisticated background to full effect in the courtroom, connecting with jurors through an "infectious, perpetual, coprophagous grin", "soft cajun accent", and numerous "country-lawyer malapropisms". Further, he complimented his casual style with pranks and showmanship influenced by Melvin Belli. Gauthier was also a coalition builder in a field that was normally extremely competitive and looked beyond his field to form close partnerships with politicians including dozens of city mayors including Mayor Marc Morial as well as Governor Edwin Edwards, and President Clinton.

=== Louisiana Gas Explosions ===
Wendell Gauthier's first notable cases were a series of seven gas explosions at homes in the metro area. Gauthier agreed to be part of a panel of experts that fixed the problem, preventing more explosions and therefore more lawsuits. Gauthier said that it "put me out of the gas pipe business, but I was glad to be a part of the panel".

=== MGM Grand Fire Litigation (1980) ===
The MGM Grand hotel in Las Vegas caught fire November 21, 1980 with approximately 3,400 registered guests inside. Eighty-four people died and more than a thousand more suffered injury. Gauthier, along with a team of eight other named attorneys and their firms successfully reached a $170 million settlement.

== Illness and death ==
Wendell Gauthier died in his home of Liver cancer Wednesday, December 12, 2001.

== Legacy ==
Wendell Gauthier's daughter, Celeste Gauthier now continues the Gauthier name in the firm that Wendell founded in the 1970s and which still operates out of the same building. They undertake a variety of suits but have expanded, under the direction of managing partner John Houghtaling, to represent property owners against insurance companies.

During his life, Wendell Gauthier served as a visiting member of his alma matar's faculty and after his death, Anne Gauthier donated a new 17,657 square foot wing to the law school. This was the largest gift the college ever received from an individual. The "family and friends of Mr. Gauthier" also established the Wendell H. Gauthier Lectureship in Trial Advocacy and Practice at Tulane University's Law School.

The Wendell and Anne Gauthier Family Foundation supports "music, visual arts, and Catholic education". The foundation funds the Peter J. Castano Endowed Scholarship and the Michael St. Martin Chair in Environmental Law at Loyola New Orleans. The foundation also supports the Musical Arts Society of New Orleans, the Louisiana Philharmonic Orchestra, and the George Rodrigue Foundation. The family foundation purchased the Saga of the Acadians in order to allow it to tour throughout the Acadiana and the rest of the state.

== In popular culture ==
Wendell Gauthier is portrayed as Wendell Rohr in John Grisham's bestselling 1996 novel Runaway Jury as well as the movie adaptation. The novel uses the Castano v. American Tobacco Company case as its setting while the movie, released in 2003 substitutes gun control as the issue being litigated. Celeste Wood, another major character, may be named for Wendell's daughter Celeste.
