= Russian Cypriots =

Ethnic group of Russian descent residing in Cyprus

Русские киприоты (Russian)

Total population
- 18,000–50,000

Regions with significant populations
- Limassol, Nicosia, Paphos

Languages
- Russian, Greek

Religion
- Orthodox Christianity (Russian and Cypriot churches)

Related ethnic groups
- Russians, Cypriots

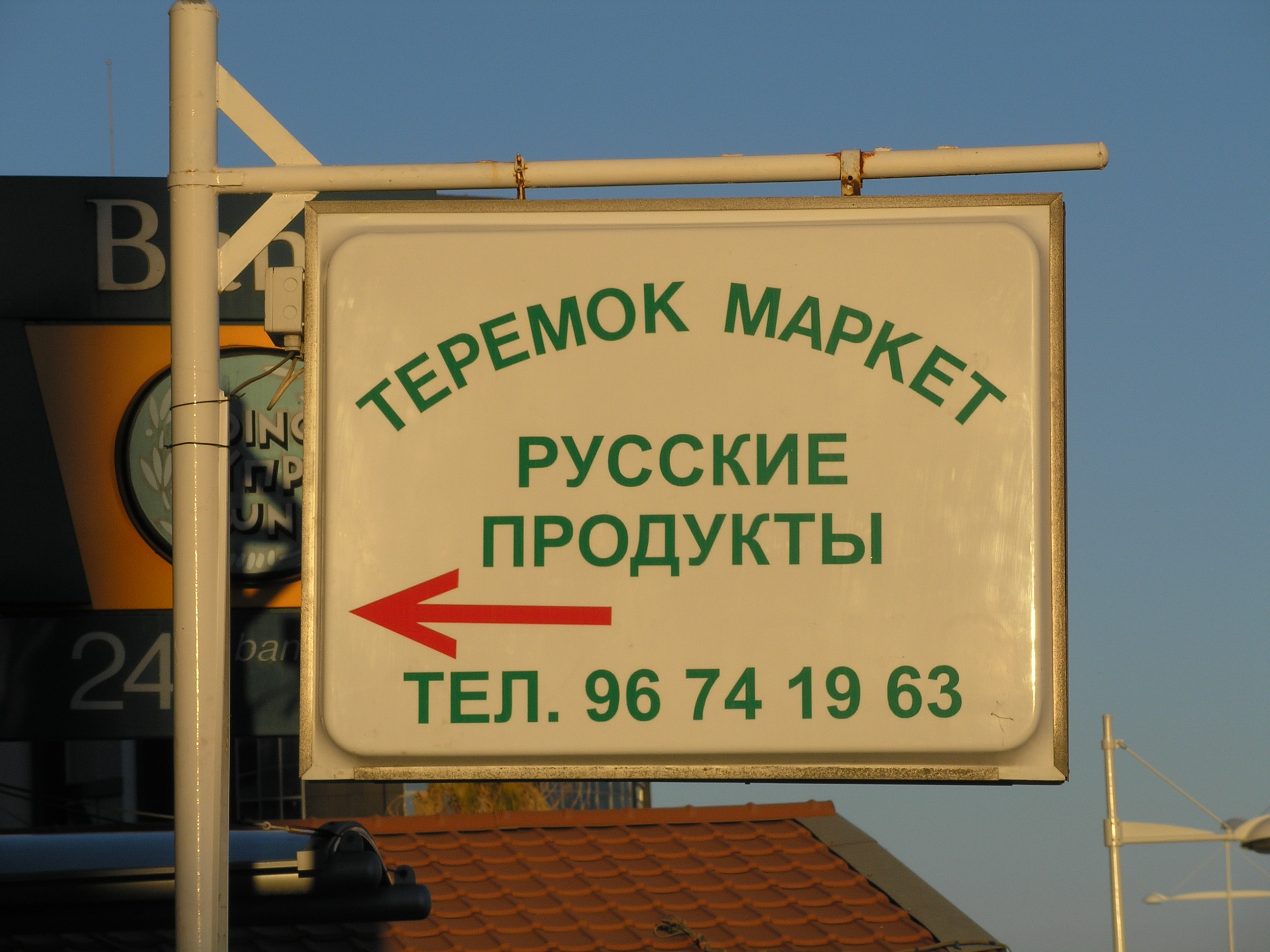
Russian minimarket in Limassol, Cyprus

Russian Cypriots (Russian: русские киприоты, Greek: Ρωσσοκύπριοι) are an ethnic Russian minority in Cyprus.

== History and presence ==
The influx of Russians in Cyprus began notably after the dissolution of the Soviet Union in the early 1990s. Many Russians were attracted to Cyprus because of its warmer climate, business opportunities, and beneficial tax policies for foreign investors.

Limassol, Nicosia, and Paphos have all seen an increase in Russian residents over the years. In particular, Limassol has become a hub for the Russian-speaking population, with many Russian businesses, schools, and churches being established in the city.

== Integration and community life ==
Russian Cypriots have been successful in integrating into the Cypriot society. They participate actively in business, cultural activities, and contribute to the local economies of the cities they inhabit. Many have learned the Greek language and embraced aspects of Cypriot culture while maintaining their Russian heritage.

== Culture and religion ==
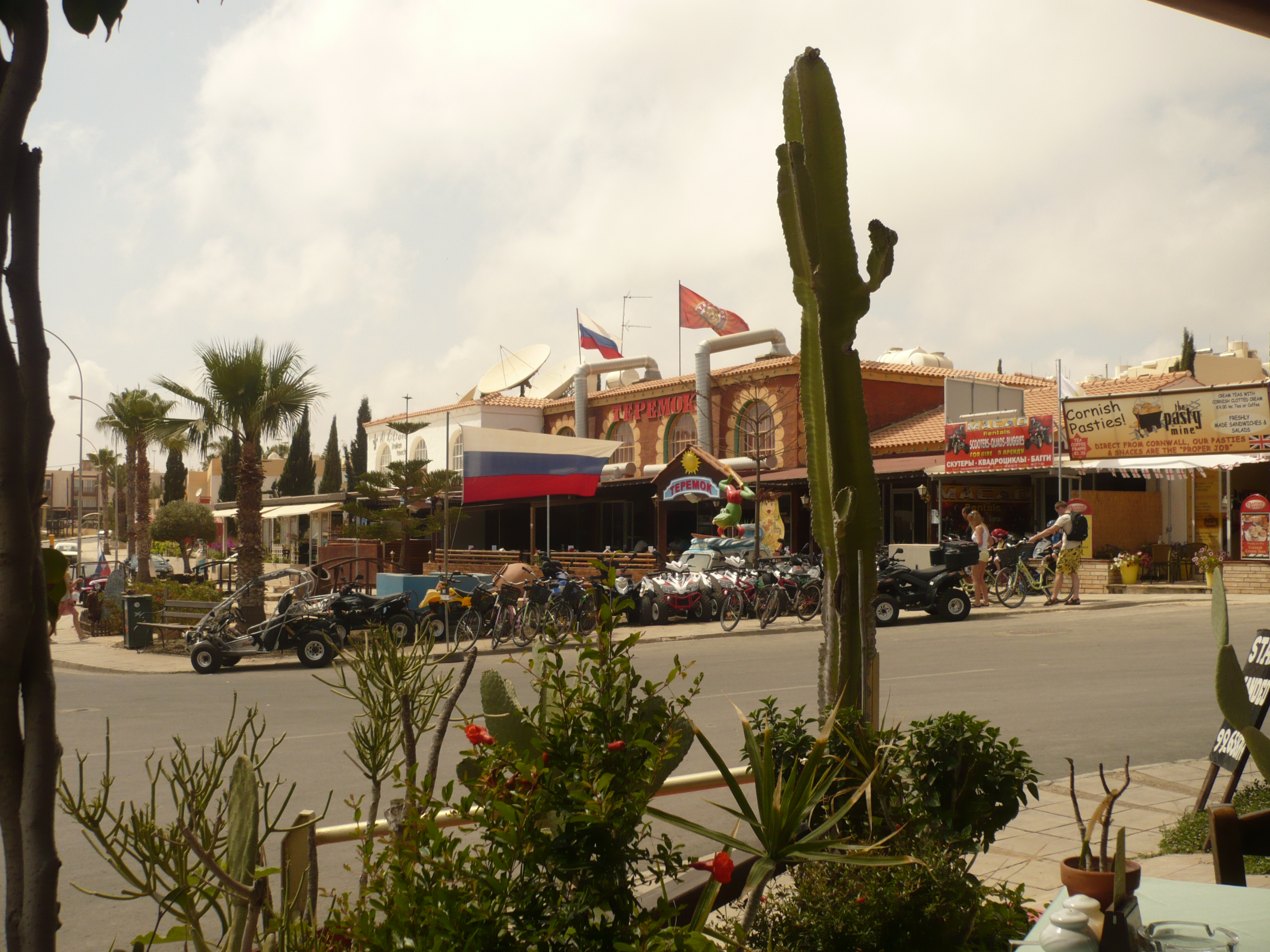
Russian flags are flown near Teremok mall, Limassol, Cyprus, 2011

Orthodox Christianity plays a significant role in the lives of Russian Cypriots. Their religious practices connect the two cultures due to shared faith between most Cypriots and Russians. Russian Cypriots also organize cultural events, music festivals, and art exhibitions. Russian-language newspapers and radio stations operate in Cyprus.

== Challenges and controversies ==
While the Russian community has integrated well, there have been challenges. Money laundering and illicit activities have cast a shadow over the community. (Note: Many sources:) Many Russian Cypriots have worked to dispel these stereotypes.

== Notable people ==
=== Foreign investors with dual Russian-Cypriot citizenship ===
- Oleg Deripaska (born 1968), Russian oligarch
- Konstantin Grigorishin (born 1965), Russian-Ukrainian businessman
- Leonid Lebedev (born 1956), Russian businessman and former politician
- Nikita Mishin (born 1971), Russian billionaire
- Alexander Ponomarenko (born 1964), Russian billionaire
- Dmitry Rybolovlev (born 1966), Russian oligarch

=== Athletes ===
- Angelina Kudryavtseva (born 2005), Cypriot ice dancer
- Ilia Karankevich (born 2004), Cypriot ice dancer

== See also ==
- Cyprus–Russia relations
- Demographics of Cyprus
