= Transoil =

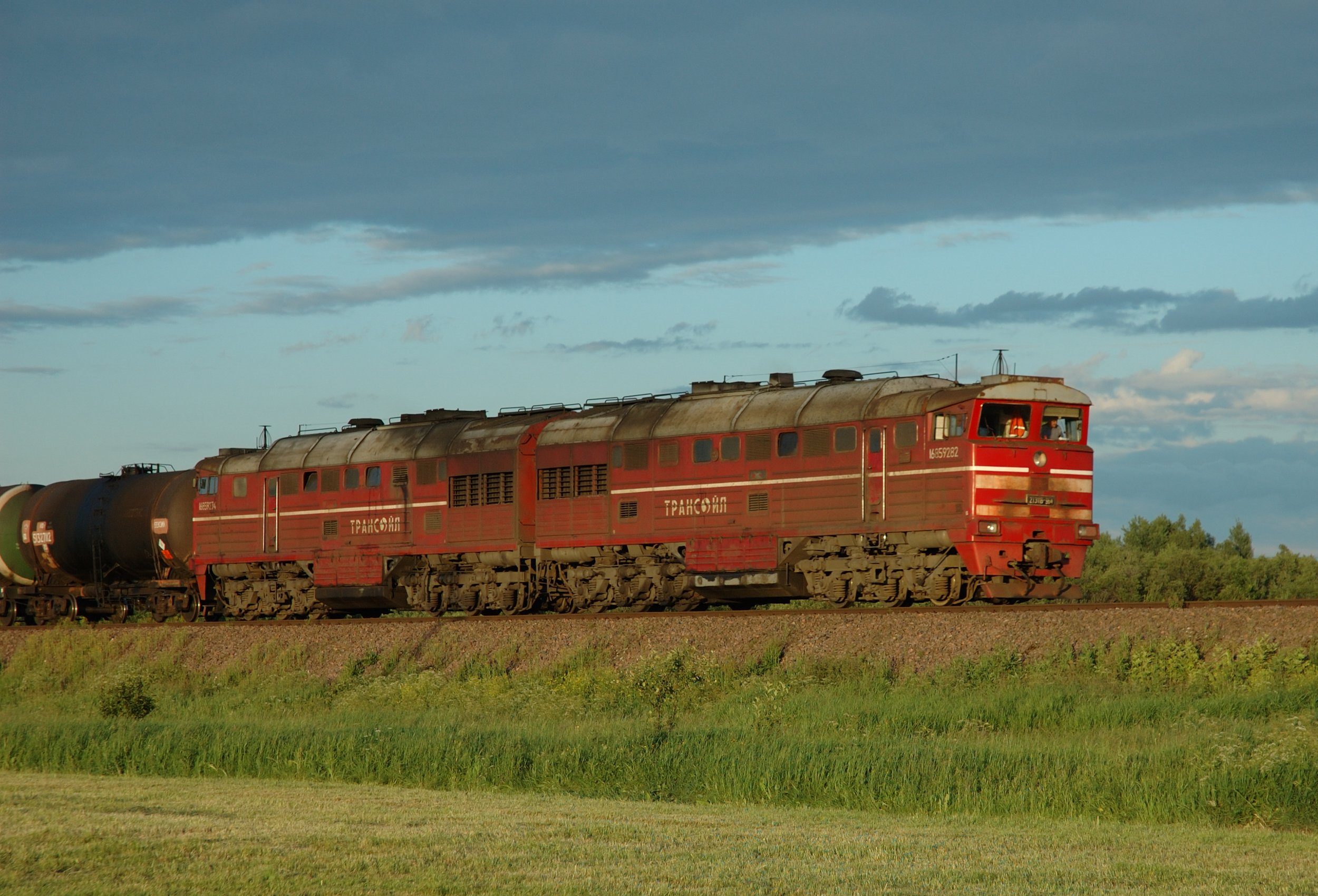
Locomotive 2TE116-964 of Russian railway operator Transoil, between stations Tapa and Lehtse, Estonia

LLC Transoil is a railway operator in Russia and was founded in 2003. The company is one of the biggest railway transporters of oil and oil products in Russia. LLC Transoil is based in Saint Petersburg, Russia. LLC Transoil operates 34,000 tanker railcars and 36 locomotives.

== Financial ==
Total sales for the LLC Transoil for the first three quarters of 2012 amounted to 51.1 billion rubles.

== Ownership ==
Late in 2011, Konstantin Nikolaev and Nikita Mishin sold to Gennady Timchenko, who had owned an 80% stake, their 13% stake for $150–200 million in Transoil.

In December 2012, Iskander Makhmudov and his business partner Andrei Bokarev purchased a 13% stake in Transoil. They purchased the shares from Gennady Timchenko, co-owner of the global commodity trading company Gunvor. LLC Transoil is a railway operator and is one of the biggest railway transporters of oil and oil products in Russia with total sales in 2012 of 51.1 billion rubles.

As of 2019, Timchenko owned an 80% stake in Transoil and Bokarev and Makhmudov owned a minority stake.

== Leadership ==
Vladimir Sokolov is the CEO of LLC Transoil. The board of directors includes Igor Valerievich, Viktor Komanov, Indrek Gusev, Alexey Kuvandykov, Alexander Nazarchuk, and Xenia Frank.

== Transportation of light petrochemicals ==
Since January 2011, LLC Transoil started transportation of light petrochemicals to the Rosneftbunker terminal in the Ust-Luga port in the Leningrad region. Since the start of the service, the total amount of transportation was about 12.1 million tons of heavy oil products. In 2012, the volume of cargo transportation increased by 52%. LLC Transoil won contracts to carry 70% of freight on its tank wagons from Achinsky refinery, and more than 30% of cargo from Angarsk, including petrochemicals.
