= The Trial (painting) =

1947 painting by Sidney Nolan

- Artist: Sidney Nolan
- Year: 1947
- Type: Enamel paint on Composition board
- Dimensions: 90.7 cm × 121.2 cm (30 in × 34 in)
- Location: National Gallery of Australia; Canberra

The Trial is an enamel painting by the Australian painter Sidney Nolan, from 1947.

This painting depicts Ned Kelly's trial, where Kelly is depicted in handcuffs. A judge and several people look at him in the court. The painting is one of a number by Nolan to use enamel paint, usually Ripolin, a commercial paint not intended for art (and nothing to do with true vitreous enamel).

Nolan painted the picture at Heide at Bulleen, Victoria, the home of John Reed and his wife, Sunday.

Sunday Reed may have helped paint the floor of this painting. She supported Nolan while he painted the Kelly series.

This painting is currently in the National Gallery of Australia. The painting was donated by Sunday Reed. Nolan had left the painting among many others at Heide. Although Nolan once wrote to Sunday Reed to tell her to take what she wanted, he subsequently demanded all his works back. Sunday Reed returned 284 other paintings and drawings to Nolan, but she refused to give up the 27 remaining Kellys, partly because she saw the works as fundamental to the proposed Heide Museum of Modern Art. Eventually, she gave them to the National Gallery of Australia in 1977 and this resolved the dispute.

In 1973, Nolan reproduced The Trial on a woven wool tapestry, which was lent to Admiralty House in Kirribilli, the official Sydney residence of the Governor-General of Australia. The tapestry was Sir John Kerr's favourite backdrop when making televised addresses. It is now located at the Federal Court of Australia in Sydney.
