= First-class Marksman (painting) =

1946 painting by Sidney Nolan

- Artist: Sidney Nolan
- Year: 1946
- Type: Ripolin enamel and alkyd on hardboard
- Dimensions: 90.2 cm × 121.2 cm (35 in × 47 in)
- Location: Art Gallery of NSW, Sydney

First-class Marksman (1946) is a painting by the Australian painter Sidney Nolan.

The painting depicts the figure of Ned Kelly in solid black armour, Nolan's most recognisable motif, firing a rifle against the Australian landscape. The title refers to an incident that took place in Victoria's Stringybark Creek, when Kelly and his gang were practising their marksmanship, firing hundreds of rounds at surrounding trees from a bullet-proof hide-out.

Dubbed "the missing Nolan", the work was the only painting in Nolan's first series of 27 Ned Kelly paintings not in the collection of the National Gallery of Australia or Heide Museum of Modern Art. It was purchased by the Art Gallery of New South Wales for $5.4 million.

In 2010, First-class Marksman became the most expensive painting ever sold at auction in Australia.
