= Cyprus–Russia relations =

- Cyprus: Russia

Diplomatic mission
- Embassy of Cyprus, Moscow: Embassy of Russia, Nicosia

Cyprus–Russia relations refers to bilateral foreign relations between the Republic of Cyprus and the Russian Federation. The Soviet Union established diplomatic relations with the newly independent Republic of Cyprus on 18 August 1960. Cooperation between both countries has increased since the 1990s because of the end of the Soviet Union. Cyprus has an embassy in Moscow, and Russia has an embassy in Nicosia.

== Political relations ==
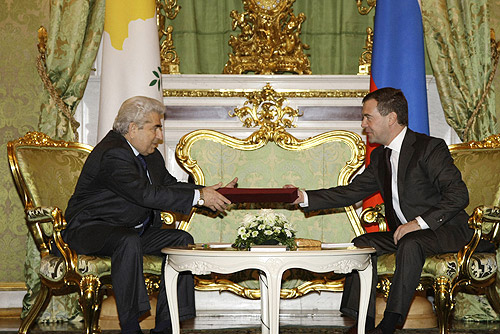
Cypriot president Demetris Christofias in Russia in November 2008

When Cyprus gained its independence from the United Kingdom on 16 August 1960, the Soviet Union recognised the newly independent state on 18 August 1960. After the end of the Soviet Union, Cyprus recognised the Russian Federation as its successor state on 7 April 1992.

After the 2022 Russian invasion of Ukraine started, Cyprus, as an EU member, imposed sanctions on Russia; Russia responded by adding all EU countries to the list of "unfriendly nations".

== Military relations ==
In January 1997 Cyprus signed an agreement with Rosvooruzheniye for the sale and delivery of 40 S-300PMU-1 missiles. The sale, valued at US$200 million and caused tensions with Turkey, which threatened to blockade the island to stop delivery and did not rule out military action. Michael Barletta suggested that the Russians may have made the sale as a rebuke to NATO, which had continued to expand the alliance against Russian objections. He continued by saying that the Russians may have been seen to encouraging conflict between NATO allies, which would create opposition to the continued expansion of the alliance and demonstrate that Russia would not accept its security and political interests being ignored by the United States.

A spokesman for the Russian Foreign Ministry stated that the deal was on a pure commercial basis, rejected notions that the deal may be responsible for tensions on Cyprus and pointing out that Russia had proposed demilitarisation of the island. Despite objections from some quarters, Russian Foreign Minister Yevgeny Primakov stated in February 1998 that Russia was intent on delivering the missiles to the Cypriots and noted that they are defensive weapons.

After Turkish objections the missiles were transferred to Greece and never deployed on the island.

== Economic relations ==
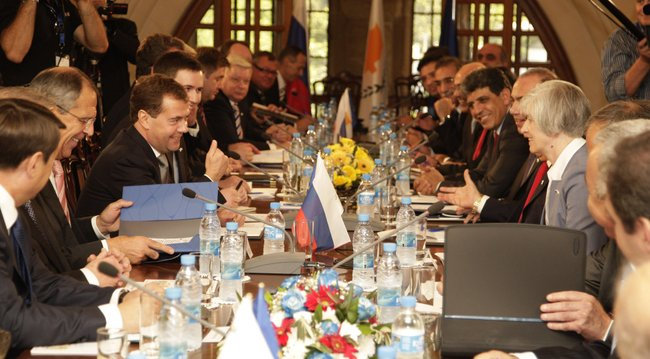
Russian-Cypriot talks.

Cyprus is officially the third largest foreign investor in the Russian economy; most of foreign direct investments from Cyprus are in fact, Russian capitals hidden offshore for tax and legal protection purposes. The cooperation with other Russian regions - Tatarstan, St.Petersburg, Krasnodar Region has developed steadily. On March 22, 2005, the Memorandum on Cooperation between the Ministry of Trade and Economic Cooperation of the Republic of Tatarstan and the Ministry of Commerce, Industry and Tourism of the Republic of Cyprus was signed.

The unilateral decision by the European Union in March 2013 imposing a levy on Cypriot bank accounts to finance its bailout fund was angrily received by representatives of the Russian state. Based on previous negotiations with the EU, it was expected that Russia extends its five-year loan obligations towards Cyprus but the recent EU fiscal regulations, which heavily weigh on Russian assets in Cyprus, will likely affect Moscow's decision on restructuring its loan to the island nation.

In 2021 Russia exported $214m of goods to Cyprus, the main item being $60m of tug boats, Cyprus exported $95m of goods to Russia, with $31m of aircraft being the main item. Between 1995 and 2021 Russian exports rose by an average of 1.92% p.a. whereas Cypriot exports have fallen by an average of 2.13% p.a.

== EU bail-in reactions ==
Cyprus offers the benefits of English common law, which businesses often consider to be more flexible when drawing up contracts. "Russia should be blamed for not allowing people the level of comfort they wish," said Bruk. "As with high tax countries like Germany or France, if you pressure people to pay high levels of tax, why blame Cyprus for creating a low-tax jurisdiction? The way to stop cash outflow is to make tax legislation fair and easy to deal with." Vladimir Gidirim, partner, International Tax, Ernst & Young, said companies would take the risk of a further deterioration in the Cyprus tax system but smaller and medium-sized companies in particular would not leave the jurisdiction. However larger companies might make use of holding companies in additional jurisdictions.

"There is no alternative to Cyprus as a jurisdiction. The tax system for holdings is far too advanced and flexible. The Netherlands and Luxembourg do contain some features, but those conditions are still not as favorable for investors. There is no direct matching. You cannot simply take a Cyprus company and replace it like a piece of Lego in Luxembourg. You would need to use several jurisdictions, with several layers of holding companies in order to achieve a cascading system of tax distributions."

== Russian intelligence operations in Cyprus ==
In 2010, US authorities cracked down on Russian "Illegals Program" in the United States. One of the suspects, Christopher R. Metsos, was detained on June 29, 2010 while he was attempting to depart from Cyprus for Budapest, but he was released on bail and then disappeared. The Guardian wrote that "his disappearance has highlighted Cyprus's close ties to Russia, and the potential that Moscow helped him escape from the Mediterranean island".

== State visit by Russian president to Cyprus ==
Russian President Dmitry Medvedev and Cypriot President Demetris Christofias met in Nicosia on 10 October 2010 and discussed a wide range of issues, including cooperation in the economy, finance, tourism and the humanitarian sphere. Medvedev also took part in the Cyprus-Russia Business Forum.

== 2022-present ==
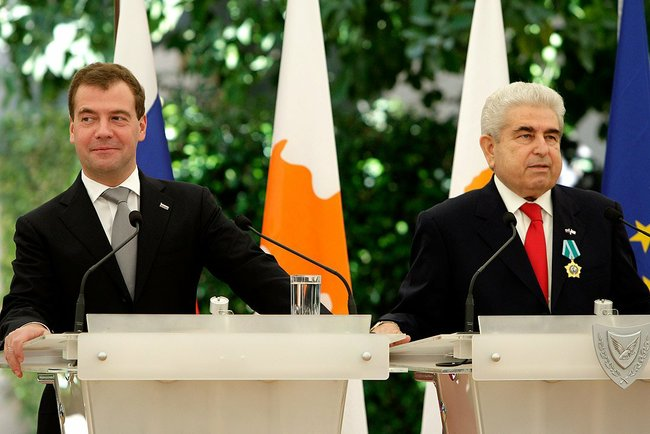
News conference following Russian-Cypriot talks in Nicosia

Following the Russian invasion of Ukraine, Cyprus has begun cutting its financial and business connections with Russia. Several actions were made such as closing bank accounts of about 42,700 companies and 125,800 accounts, that were linked to Russian people and businesses. Cyprus has also changed parts of its economy and banking, especially in defense-related areas, to avoid risks from past practices that made the island a center for Russian money. As part of it move towards the west, Cyprus joined EU sanctions on Russia.

== See also ==
- Foreign relations of Cyprus
- Foreign relations of Russia
- Russians in Cyprus
- List of ambassadors of Russia to Cyprus
- Russia–EU relations
