= Konstantin Nikolaev =

Russian billionaire (born 1971)

- Born: Konstantin Yuryevich Nikolaev; 5 March 1971 (age 55); Dniepropetrovsk, Ukrainian SSR, Soviet Union
- Citizenship: Russia
- Occupation: Businessman
- Spouse: Married
- Children: 5

Konstantin Yuryevich Nikolaev (also transliterated as Nikolayev) (Russian: Константин Юрьевич Николаев; born March 5, 1971) is an international businessman and former co-owner N-Trans, Globaltrans, the largest private rail operator in Russia, CIS, and the Baltic states and Global Ports. He is under sanctions by Ukraine. According to the Forbes, in 2019 Nikolaev's net worth was estimated at $1.2 billion. He began exiting his Russian business interests in 2014 and completed this process in early 2024.

== Biography ==
Konstantin Nikolaev was born in Dnipropetrovsk on 5 March 1971.

In 1993, Nikolaev graduated from Moscow State University, which he entered in 1988. He initially studied in the Department of the History of Foreign Philosophy, but later transferred to the Department of Ethics, both within the Faculty of Philosophy. His thesis focused on Plato's The Republic.

Nikolaev began his career in transportation and logistics in the early 1990s as a forwarding agent at Murmansk port, where he coordinated the loading and unloading of ships.

In 1993, he joined Petra, the second largest private transportation and forwarding company in Russia, working as a Deputy Commercial Director overseeing port operations.

In 1994, Nikolaev co-founded Aniko Marine, a transportation and forwarding company that serviced major steel companies including Novolipetsk Steel (NLMK) and Cherepovets Steel Mill. As General Director and one-third shareholder, he managed client relationships and negotiated with ports, shippers, and competitors.

In March 1996, Nikolaev, Nikita Mishin, Andrei Filatov, and Alexey Mordashov formed Severstaltrans (Russian: "Северстальтранс") with Mordashov holding a 50% stake and the other three holding equal stakes of the remaining shares. In early 2008, Mordashov sold his 50% stake in Severstaltrans to Nikolaev and his partners then Severstaltrans changed its name to N-Trans (Russian: "Н-Транс"). In 2008, 70% of Globaltrans shares were held by N-Trans. In 2008, 30% of the shares of Cypriot-based Globaltrans Investments Plc were offered as an IPO in July 2012 in London for $520 million.

He served as CEO from 1997 until 2008 (when Severstaltrans was restructured and rebranded as N-Trans), overseeing the company's growth into a leading provider of transportation and logistics services in Russia. During this period, the company began accumulating railway and port assets.

In 2004, Globaltrans Investment PLC was established to consolidate the company's railway assets. OJSC New Transportation Company, which handled the operating part of Severstaltrans’ business, and Sevtekhnotrans LLC, which was responsible for purchasing and leasing railcars, were transferred to Globaltrans, as well as a growing fleet of privately owned railcars. By 2023, the company was operating a fleet of 66,000 railcars (94% of them owned directly).

According to Finance Magazine (Russian: Журнал «Финанс») in February 2011, Nikolaev as co-owner of the N-Trans holding group was ranked 117 richest Russian with an estimated worth of $920 million which was nearly identical to his business partners Nikita Mishin ranked 116th worth an estimated $920 million.

Late in 2011, Nikolaev and Mishin sold to Gennady Timchenko their 13% stake for $150–200 million in Transoil, which is one of the largest railway transporters of oil and oil products in Russia.

In 2014, Nikolaev, Mikhail Yuriev, Andrey Kunatbaev, Roman Abramovich, Alexander Abramov, and Alexander Voloshin became the majority investors in John Houghtaling II's American Ethane. After Roman Abramov divested his investment in American Ethane in April 2017, Nikolaev, Yuriev, and Kunatbaev became co-owners of American Ethane with a combined stake of 88%. (Note: Alexander Voloshin is a secret investor in the remaining 12% stake.)

Between 2006 and 2015, Nikolaev was a shareholder in Mostotrest, one of Russia's leading infrastructure construction companies, responsible for major projects including the Big Obukhov Bridge in St. Petersburg, transport interchanges for the 2014 Winter Olympics, and sections of the Moscow-St. Petersburg highway.

Before October 2014, Nikolaev and his investment partners owned a combined 31.55% stake and Arkady Rotenberg held the other 68.45% stake in Marc O'Polo Investments which held a 38.63% stake in the major road construction firm Mostotrest (Russian: "Мостотрест").

In 2007, Nikolaev and his partners became independent owners of Severstaltrans, which was rebranded as N-Trans in 2008. Nikolaev continued as CEO. N-Trans included more than 20 companies, mainly involved in railway transportation and port operations.

In 2008, Global Ports Investments was formed to operate the Group's port assets. These included container terminals in Russia's key maritime regions (St. Petersburg and the Far East), two port facilities in Finland, and five inland terminals across Finland and Poland, as well as a 50% stake in an Estonian transshipment terminal. This network of assets established Global Ports as a major terminal operator spanning multiple countries in the Baltic and Far Eastern regions.

In May 2008, Globaltrans conducted an IPO on the London Stock Exchange, placing 29% of shares. That same month, the partners sold a 50% stake in Vladivostok Container Terminal LLC for $200 million.

In 2011, Global Ports Investments went public on the London Stock Exchange. The IPO was a success.

In April 2012, the partners sold a further 37.5% stake in Global Ports.

In 2013, N-Trans acquired the National Container Company, a domestic operator with a network of terminals mostly in the Baltic Sea region. From 2014 to 2019, Nikolaev was an investor in Technoprom LLC, a Moscow-based system operator developing digital B2B tools for the Russian market.

Nikolaev and his partners owned 34.5% of Globaltrans (an 11.5% stake for each) but sold the stevedore and ports holding company assets, Global Ports, in December 2017. At that time, Global Ports included the management of the ports at the First Container Terminal, Petrolesport, Ust-Luga Container Terminal, and the Moby Dick in northwestern Russia; Eastern Stevedoring Company in the Far East; and two in Finland: the Multi-Link Helsinki and the Multi-Link Kotka.

In January 2024, he finalized his exit from Globaltrans, which also marked his final exit from all Russian business interests—a process he had begun a decade prior.

Since 2014 Nikolaev was a major investor in a satellite imagery company ScanEx (Russian: Сканэкс) which supplies classified imagery intelligence to private and state-owned companies and agencies such as Gazprom, Rosneft, Yandex, the Ministry of Natural Resources, and others.

Later in 2014, Nikolaev transferred his stake in the business to his wife, Svetlana, who subsequently sold her 30.67% share in ScanEx in July 2023.

ScanEx's work with satellite imagery required licenses from the Russian government, including permits from the FSB. As Nikolaev's spokesperson publicly explained, such licenses are “standard” for businesses that collect “geographic data for commercial use,” and stated that the licenses “are not indicative of any connection with Russian intelligence services.”.

ScanEx is closely associated with Arkady Rotenberg and Igor Rotenberg and his Mostotrest. (Note: ScanEx (Russian: Сканэкс) acts as a system integrator, creating and implementing new technical and information technology solutions in various sectors of the country's economy, implements projects based on remote sensing data in the field of ecology, science and education. Its subsidiaries are KOSMOSNIMKI.RU LLC (Russian: ООО «КОСМОСНИМКИ.РУ»), JSC "CRIT" (CENTER FOR THE DEVELOPMENT OF INFORMATION TECHNOLOGIES) (Russian: АО «ЦРИТ» (ЦЕНТР РАЗВИТИЯ ИНФОРМАЦИОННЫХ ТЕХНОЛОГИЙ)), and MULTISCAN LLC (Russian: ООО «МУЛЬТИСКАН»). ScanEx supports government and business structures, environmental organizations, research and educational institutions, including Roslesinforg, Rosreestr, Rosselkhoznadzor, Roshydromet, the Ministry of Emergency Situations of Russia, the Ministry of Natural Resources of Russia, Rosneft, Gazprom, Lukoil, Atomflot, Yandex, leading universities in Russia and many others. SCANEX products are remote sensing, GIS and web technologies in the countries of Russia, Vietnam, India, Iran, Spain, Kazakhstan, Latvia, Lebanon, Nepal, Nigeria, UAE, USA, Uzbekistan, Ukraine, Azerbaijan, Armenia, Belarus. ScanEx Group is the only company in Russia and the CIS that directly receives data from remote sensing satellites to its own network of stations, processes satellite information using its own technologies and provides access to satellite images and products based on them through its own geoportal services developed by ScanEx, which guarantees the consumer a low cost for data and prompt deliveries. ScanEx is the official distributor of the world's leading remote sensing satellite operators including DigitalGlobe (USA), Airbus Defence and Space (France), ImageSat International (Israel), MDA (Canada), SatrecInitiative (Korea), e-GEOS (Italy), RESTEC (Japan), Deimos (Spain), etc., by offering satellite images of various spatial resolutions. ScanEx is the only domestic company in Russia that has signed license agreements for direct reception of data from spacecraft of the SPOT, EROS, RADARSAT series, which makes it possible to survey the territory of Russia 24/7. Its flagship projects are the Scanex Maritime portal, the development of geoinformation services for the forest industry, the modernization of the Scanex Catalog service for ordering and working with satellite images, the development of geoinformation products and solutions for the education sector, etc.)

Nikolaev, as a member of the 13 August 2011 established Right to Arms (Russian: Право на оружие), and supported liberalization of arms ownership in Russia.

Nikolayev was one of the first investors in LLC "Photoelectronic Devices" (FP), established in 2013 to produce microbolometer arrays for night vision technologies, which Russia had previously been forced to import. FP was founded in September 2013 by a Cyprus-registered company, Rayfast Investments, and the company "Cyclone," a state research institution and one of the few Russian manufacturers of thermal imaging equipment.

According to Nikolayev, a decision to shut down the project was made in 2020. LLC "Photoelectronic Devices" was officially liquidated in 2021.

The state's contribution to the project was limited to providing a production facility for a period of 10 years and contributing 700,000 rubles (around €9,000) to the company's charter capital, according to Nikolayev. In contrast, his company invested around 385.2 million rubles (approximately €3.8 million) into the project. Ultimately, as previously noted, the project failed, and Nikolayev incurred a loss on his investment.

According to Ilya Yashin, in January 2017, Konstantin Nikolaev, his wife Svetlana Nikolaeva and Maria Butina attended the inauguration of Donald Trump as President of the United States.

Since 2013, Nikolaev has owned and operated the La Madonnina winery in Bolgheri, Tuscany, which he purchased for 4 million euros. Riccardo Cotarella, who is an oenologist, heads the association of Italian winemakers (Italian: Assoenologi) and, with his brother Renzo, produces wine under the Familia Cotarella brand, who serves is the manager of both the La Madonnina estate and the cellar for Nikolaev. (Note: Riccardo Cotarella, who is a consultant for Nikolaev's winery is also a consultant since spring 2017 to the 2009 established Divnomorsky Estate winery (Russian: Усадьба Дивноморское), which is also called Usadba Divnomorskoe, is very near Putin's palace which is located on the Black Sea coast near Gelendzhik, Krasnodar Krai, Russia, and, according to Alexei Navalny's Putin's Palace, Divnomorsky estate is the wine of Putin's palace, which is an official presidential house for the president of Russia, and the wine of Divnomorsky Estate, which began selling its wine to the public in October 2013, is often consumed at official Russian government state dinners, events, and functions. Wine from Divnomorsky Estate or Usadba Divnomorskoe, which is also transliterated as Usadba Divnomorskoye, is known as "Putin's wine". Led by a young Italian sparkling wine maker Matteo Coletti, first the winemaker Alexey Tolstoy (Russian: Алексей Толстой) and later the winemaker Oleg Nichvidyuk (Russian: Олег Ничвидюк) produced the Divnomorsky Estate wines including the sparkling Divnomorki (Russian: игристое «дивноморки»). Owned by Lazurnaya Yagoda LLC (Russian: ООО «Лазурная ягода»), Divnomorsky Estate is located near a coastal cliff, which was formerly known for its nudist beach, on 47 hectares (120 acres) with 30 hectares (74 acres) north of Divnomorskoye, which is often called "False Gelendzhik" (Russian: «Фальшивый Геленджик»), with the remainder in the village of Praskoveevka which is near Cape Idokopas (Russian: мы́се Идокопа́с). In 2010, Alexander Ponomarenko, who is the former co-owner of the Novorossiysk commercial sea port, became chairman of the board of directors of Sheremetyevo airport and gained ownership of Putin's Palace in 2011 from the co-owners of Rosinvest, which were Nikolai Shamalov and his two partners Dmitry Gorelov and Sergei Kolesnikov, owned Usadba Divnomorskoye and sold the winery in 2012 to Pavel Titov, who is the president of the Abrau-Durso winery and son of businessman Boris Titov. In January 2019, Gennady Timchenko and Vladimir Kolbin, who is the son of Pyotr, Petr or Peter Kolbin (Russian: Петр Колбин) who is a close childhood friend of Vladimir Putin, became beneficial owners of Divnomorskoye Estate through gaining ownership of the firm Lazurnaya Yagoda, which controls Usadba Divnomorskoye, by their firm Development of Agrarian Initiatives (RAI) (Russian: «Развитие аграрных инициатив» (РАИ)). In August 2021, Riccardo Cotarella terminated his contract with Divnomorsky Estate.)

The estate produces approximately 30,000 bottles annually of red, rosé, and sparkling wines, as well as olive oil and grappa. Having exited from all Russian business interests, the winery is his main focus today.

== Sanctions ==
As of July 2023, Ukraine has Konstantin Nikolaev and Svetlana Nikolaeva under sanctions.

== Personal life ==
He is married, and has five children.

Konstanin Nikolaev and his whole family are citizens of Malta and his children are residents of Switzerland.

His wife Svetlana Ivanovna Nikolaeva (Russian: Светлана Ивановна Николаева), who enjoys shooting sports, till August 2020 owned ORSIS, (Note: ORSIS is an anacronym for ORuzheyniye SIStemy (Russian: ОРУЖЕЙНЫЕ СИСТЕМЫ) or "Weapon Systems".) a Russian sporting rifles firearms company. Nikolaev exited the business in 2014.

Honorary Citizen of Zavolzhye, Gorodets District, Nizhny Novgorod Region for his donation towards the construction and beautification of the Orthodox Church of the Life-Giving Trinity (2007).
