= Aleksandr Voloshin =

Russian politician

Alexander Voloshin
- Александр Волошин
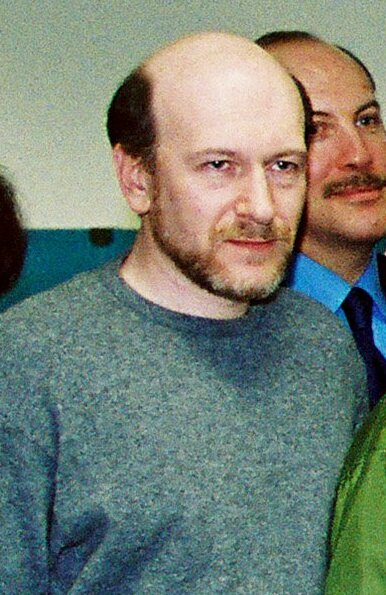
- Voloshin in 2000

Chief of Staff of the Presidential Executive Office
- In office 19 March 1999 – 30 October 2003
- President: Boris Yeltsin; Vladimir Putin
- Preceded by: Nikolay Bordyuzha
- Succeeded by: Dmitry Medvedev

Personal details
- Born: 3 March 1956 (age 70) Moscow, Russian SFSR, Soviet Union
- Education: Moscow State University of Railway Engineering, All-Russian Academy of Foreign Trade

Alexander Stalyevich Voloshin (Russian: Александр Стальевич Волóшин; born 3 March 1956) is a Russian politician who briefly was chairman of the board of directors of RAO UES, the former Russian state power utility, which was liquidated as part of the country's comprehensive power sector reforms on 1 July 2008. He has the federal state civilian service rank of 1st class Active State Councillor of the Russian Federation.

== Political activity ==
In 1997, he was appointed as an assistant to the chief of the Russian presidential administration under Boris Yeltsin. He then went on to serve as a deputy chief from September 1998 to March 1999 and the Chief of Presidential Administration from 19 March to 31 December 1999.

Voloshin retained his position after Vladimir Putin became acting president on 31 December 1999 and was reappointed as the Chief of the Administration after Putin's inauguration as president in May. Voloshin quickly became a core member of Putin's team and was especially praised for his intellect and his ability to "devour work". According to Tatyana Dyachenko, "At work he is like some complex well-maintained machine that does not know tiredness. I sometimes don't know how he can stand it."

Voloshin resigned on 29 October 2003. While Chief of Staff, Voloshin was widely regarded as pro-business, and his resignation amidst the prosecutorial focus on Yukos Oil Company, was seen as part of a broader turn away from free-market systems.

Alexander Voloshin has been a non-executive director of Yandex since August 2010 after serving as an advisor to the company for two years.

Between February 2012 and 2023, Alexander Voloshin served as chairman of the board and independent director at JSC Freight One.

Voloshin also served as chairman of the board of directors of Uralkali from 2010 to 2014.

Voloshin served as chairman of the board of MMC Norilsk Nickel from 2008 to 2010 and as chairman of the board of directors of RAO "UES of Russia" from 1999 to 2008.

In 2018, he became a co-owner of American Ethane with Konstantin Nikolaev, Mikhail Yuriev, and Andrey Kunatbaev.

Preceded by Nikolai Bordyuzha	Chief of the Russian presidential administration 19 March 1999, – 30 October 2003	Succeeded by Dmitry Medvedev
