= Mikhail Yuryev =

Russian politician (1959–2019)

Mikhail Zinovyevich Yuryev (Russian: Михаил Зиновьевич Юрьев; 10 April 1959 – 15 February 2019) was a Russian politician who served as a member of the State Duma between 1996 and 1999.

Yuryev came from a Jewish family. His father Zinovy Yuryev was a science fiction writer, and his mother Yelena Korenevskaya was a journalist. After graduating from the MSU Faculty of Biology Mikhail Yuryev worked at the Institute of Molecular Genetics. In 1995-1999 he was a deputy of the 2nd State Duma, a member of the Yabloko faction. Yuryev was one of the Deputy Chairmen of the State Duma under Gennady Seleznyov's chairmanship. Yuryev was an advocate of isolationism.

In 2014, Yuryev announced that he had ceased his business activities in Russia. In 2018 Yuryev founded the American Ethane Company together with Alexander Voloshin, former Kremlin Chief of Staff. In his late years Yuryev hosted several political talk shows on RSN and Komsomolskaya Pravda stations.
