= BGR Group =

Lobbying and communications firm in the US

BGR Group (previously Barbour, Griffith & Rogers) is a lobbying and communications firm based in Washington, D.C., with offices in London, Beijing and Austin, Texas. Founded in 1991 by former White House aides Ed Rogers and Haley Barbour, the firm was joined by Lanny Griffith to form Barbour Griffith & Rogers (BGR Group). In 2019, BGR was recognized by both The Hill and Bloomberg as a "Top Performing Lobbying Firm".

== History ==
The firm was founded in 1991 by Haley Barbour and Ed Rogers, who had worked with each other in the administration of Ronald Reagan. Lanny Griffith joined the following year, and the firm was named Barbour Griffith & Rogers.

The firm had close ties to the political establishment and by 1998 had been named by Fortune Magazine as one of the most influential lobbying firms in Washington.

Barbour publicly stated that he had divested himself of his stake in the company after his election as governor of Mississippi in 2004. The New Republic, however, received a copy of the blind trust he set up, which revealed shares in the parent company that owned BGR at the time. TNR reporters stated they observed Barbour entering the DC offices of BGR in June 2007. Bloomberg reported that Barbour was set to receive $300,000 per year from the trust. Several of the firms involved in cleanup of Hurricane Katrina in Mississippi were also clients of BGR. Barbour still retained the trust, which regulatory filings revealed had grown to a market value of $3.3 million by 2008/2009. He returned to the firm full time in 2012.

The firm rebranded from Barbour, Griffith & Rogers to BGR Group in the early years of the Barack Obama administration because it wanted to portray itself as bipartisan. According to Rogers, the firm's revenue had declined after Obama's election as clients perceived it would lose influence.

The firm has employed various former political figures, including Kurt Volker, Jeffrey Birnbaum and Sean Duffy.

== Notable clients ==
In 2001, BGR represented Microsoft in its antitrust battle with the U.S. Department of Justice and Fortune Magazine ranked it Washington's most-influential lobbying firm.

In 2013 the firm was paid $13.7 million for lobbying and its three largest clients were the Republic of Algeria, the Republic of India, Ukraine, Chevron Corp., and the State of Kazakhstan. In 2014, BGR supported Republican senator Thad Cochran, while he fought a tight primary election race against Tea Party candidate, Chris McDaniel. In April 2015, the Government of South Korea retained BGR for public relations and image building. Since 2015, BGR has worked for American Ethane.

BGR has worked for numerous Russian firms to the Vladimir Putin regime and Russian oligarchs. In 2016, BGR worked for Alfa-Bank and hired Mandiant to support Alfa-Bank. In 2021, BGR Group received $600,000 from LetterOne, an investment company associated with the Vladimir Putin regime in Russia.

BGR has lobbied on behalf of the Kingdom of Saudi Arabia. In 2016, BGR Group signed a contract worth $500,000 to provide "public relations and media management services for The Center [for Studies and Media Affairs at The Saudi Royal Court], which includes both traditional and social media forums". BGR dropped Saudi Arabia as a client following the assassination of Jamal Khashoggi in 2018. BGR was being paid $80,000 monthly for "public relations and media management services". Chairman Ed Rogers had been notified by The Washington Post (Khashoggi's employer) that if BGR continued to do business with Saudi Arabia, the paper would no longer run his column.

Since 2019, BGR has lobbied on behalf of the government of Hong Kong.
