= Jeffrey Birnbaum =

American journalist and television commentator

Jeffrey H. Birnbaum
- Born: 1956 (age 69–70); Scranton, Pennsylvania, U.S.
- Occupation: Journalist
- Writing career
- Genre: Non-fiction writer

Jeffrey H. Birnbaum (born 1955) is an American journalist and television commentator. He previously worked for The Washington Post and The Washington Times. He also regularly appears as a political analyst for the Fox News Channel and long appeared as a regular panelist on Washington Week. He is currently the head of the public relations division of the lobbying firm BGR Group (Barbour, Griffith & Rogers).

== Personal life ==
Birnbaum was born in Scranton, Pennsylvania, in 1955. He graduated as an English major from the University of Pennsylvania in 1977. Birnbaum is married with three children.

== Career ==
Early in his career, Birnbaum worked for The Wall Street Journal, working 16 years in a variety of positions, and leaving the Journal as White House correspondent. He then spent seven years as the chief of Fortune magazine's Washington bureau and two years, beginning in 1995, as a senior political correspondent for Fortune’s sister publication, Time. Birnbaum then worked as a columnist and feature writer at The Washington Post from 2004 to 2008. Birnbaum then joined The Washington Times as managing editor of digital in 2008. In January 2010, Birnbaum left the Times and went to work for the lobbying firm BGR Group

== Publications ==
External videos
- Booknotes interview with Birnbaum on The Lobbyists, January 10, 1993, C-SPAN
- Presentation by Birnbaum on The Money Men, July 19, 2000, C-SPAN

Birnbaum is the author of four books. His latest, The Money Men, examines campaign fund-raising and was published in 2000. His first book, Showdown at Gucci Gulch, was written with Alan Murray in 1987. This classic chronicle of the Tax Reform Act of 1986 won the American Political Science Association's coveted Carey McWilliams Award in 1988. In 1992, Birnbaum's second book, The Lobbyists, was a Washington Post best seller. Madhouse, Birnbaum's third book, about President Clinton's White House, was published in 1996.

== See also ==
- Alfa-Bank
- Timeline of Russian interference in the 2016 United States elections
- Timeline of investigations into Trump and Russia (2018) (disambiguation)
