= Andrey Filatov =

Russian entrepreneur

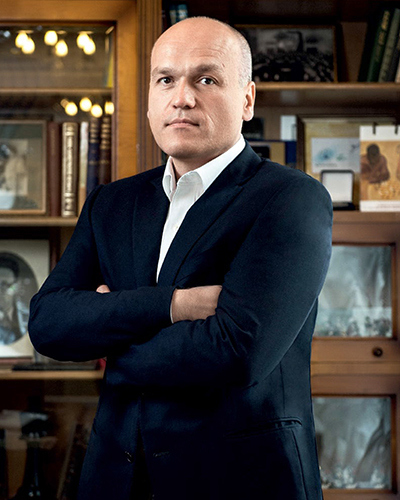
- Filatov in 2015
- Born: 18 December 1971 (age 54); Kryvyi Rih, Ukrainian SSR, Soviet Union
- Education: Belarusian State University of Physical Culture
- Occupation: Chairman of the Board of Directors of Tuloma investment company
- Spouse: Married
- Children: 8
- Awards: Legion of Honour (Chevalier)

Andrey Vasilievich Filatov (Russian: Андре́й Васи́льевич Фила́тов; born 18 December 1971) is a Russian businessman. Filatov is chairman of the Board of Directors of Tuloma investment company, and a co-owner of the Globaltrans company. In 2021, Forbes estimated his wealth at $850 million. His companies have stakes in the energy sector in Uzbekistan and Russia. Filatov is also President of the Chess Federation of Russia (from 1992 to 2018 – Russian Chess Federation).

== Biography ==
Filatov completed secondary education at Junior Sporting School 9 in the city of Dnepropetrovsk (now Dnipro), then in the Ukrainian Soviet Socialist Republic. He was ranked Candidate for Master of Sport of the USSR (chess). In 1993, he graduated from the Academy of Physical Education and Sports of the Republic of Belarus (the Belarusian State University of Physical Culture) with the diploma of Sport Instructor and Chess Coach. At the academy, he met and made friends with such chess players as Ilya Smirin and Boris Gelfand.

In 1996, together with his partners Konstantin Nikolaev and Nikita Mishin founded Severstaltrans.

Andrey Filatov is a member of the Economic Council of the French-Russian Chamber of Commerce and Industry (CCIFR).

In 2015, he was awarded the title of Honorary Academician of the Russian Academy of Arts for his contribution to the development and popularization of Russian and Soviet art.

Andrey Filatov is Chevalier of the French Legion of Honor Medal. Led by His Excellency the Ambassador of France to Russia Mr. Jean-Maurice Ripert, the official award ceremony took place on 2 March 2016, in the Chess Museum of Moscow.

In 2016, for merits in development of physical culture and sports, Andrey Filatov was honored with the Russian Medal of the Order "For Merit to the Fatherland" (2nd class). The award was given to Andrey Filatov by Russian Prime Minister Dmitry Medvedev on 10 June 2016. Andrey Filatov was awarded with a bronze medal as senior trainer of the Russian men's team at the 42nd Chess Olympiad in Baku (2016), a bronze medal at the 43nd Chess Olympiad in Batumi (2018) and a silver medal at FIDE World Team Championships in Khanty-Mansiysk (2017), in 2020 and 2021 – gold medals for winning the first and second FIDE online Olympiads.

On April 11, 2024, he was awarded the Order of Alexander Nevsky "for his great contribution to the development and popularization of the national chess movement".

== Estimated wealth ==
Andrey Filatov's main asset is the Tuloma investment company. Не is also a co-owner of the railway companies Globaltrans and Transoil Ltd (7%).

In October 2015, Filatov announced consolidation into Tuloma Investment Company, which specializes in investing in Russian companies and shares, of his personal assets (other than Global Ports, Transoil and Globaltrans). Tuloma's investment portfolio includes stakes in Coal Mining Investments Ltd., Fabrikant, Pskovneft-Terminal, real estate development projects of Volgo-Okskaya Investment Company (VOIC), Pushkin, StroyEngineering Development, as well as shares in FosAgro, Novatek, MegaFon, LukOil, Surgutneftegas and Norilsk Nickel.

In 2010, Finance magazine estimated Andrey Filatov's wealth at $920 million.

In 2011, the Russian version of Forbes magazine ranked Filatov 93rd among Russia's wealthiest business people with an estimated wealth of $1.1 billion.

In 2012, Forbes World Listing estimated Filatov's wealth at $1.3 billion (ranked 960th globally).

In November 2017, Andrey Filatov embarked on a PSA project to develop "25 Years of Independence", one of the largest gas deposits in Uzbekistan, with estimated reserves of 100 bcm. Filatov's stake in the project is 37.5%.

On 19 October 2018, Andrey Filatov and the chairman of the Board of Directors of Uzbekneftegaz JSC Bahrom Ashrafkhanov signed a supplemental agreement for the project to create a single investor and set the commercial conditions for the development of the field.

== Awards ==
- Russian Presidential Certificate of Merit (21 January 2011) for active involvement of the transfer by the Republic of Korea of the Russian cruiser Varyag (1899) jack flag to the Russian Federation.
- The Moscow Times Awards (10 December 2013) for sponsoring the startup of the first television channel dedicated exclusively to chess.
- The most popular Russian sports manager of 2014 according to the Sport History and Statistics Fan Club (Russia) rating
- Five Continents Medal of UNESCO (26 May 2015)
- National Order of the Legion of Honour (2 March 2016)
- Medal of the Order "For Merit to the Fatherland", 2nd class (14 May 2016)
- Bronze medal (Russian men's team trainer) at the 42nd Chess Olympiad in Baku (2016)
- Silver medal (Russian men's team trainer) at FIDE World Team Championships in Kanty-Mansiysk (2017)
- Bronze medal (Russian men's team trainer) at the 43rd Chess Olympiad in Batumi (2018)
- FIDE Gold Medal for the victory of the Russian national team at the first FIDE Online Olympiad (6 May 2021)
- FIDE Gold Medal for the victory of the Russian national team at the second FIDE Online Olympiad
- Nikolai Ozerov Medal for a substantial individual contribution to chess development (5 October 2022)
- Jubilee medal dedicated to the 100th anniversary of the establishment of the state governing body in the field of physical culture and sports (27 December 2023)
- the Order of Alexander Nevsky for contribution to the development and popularization of the sport in the country

== Chess and public activities ==
Andrey Filatov is a member of the Economic Council of French and Russian Businesses of the Franco-Russian Chamber of Commerce and Industry (CCIFR).

Filatov is a member of the Valaam Monastery Board of Guardians.

He has been keen on chess since childhood.

Filatov was the initiator and sponsor of the World Chess Championship 2012 held in Moscow in 2012, in the State Tretyakov Gallery. According to Filatov, "By holding the match in a museum we are attempting to emphasize the link between our favorite game and the arts, as well as pay tribute to the memory of great Russian artists in the broadest sense, including painters, writers, composers and musicians".. The game was played between Boris Gelfand and Viswanathan Anand.

Filatov funded the restoration of the tombstone monument to one of the greatest chess players, Alexander Alekhine, the first world champion who was Russian by birth, in Paris.

In memory of his first chess coach, Alexander Valerianovich Sinitsyn, Filatov set up the Sinitsyn Memorial international children chess festival, which has been held in Dnepropetrovsk since 2001.

On 1 February 2014 at the 22nd congress of the Russian Chess Federation, Andrey Filatov was elected President of the Russian Chess Federation.

On 13 August 2014, Andrey Filatov, the President of the Russian Chess Federation, was elected to the post of the vice president of the International Chess Federation (FIDE) at the world federation's congress in Norway's Tromsø. He hold office as vice president of FIDE from 2014 to 2018.

From January 2016, Filatov is the senior coach of the Russian men's national chess team. The team won a bronze medal at the 42nd Chess Olympiad in Baku in September 2016, a silver medal in the team championship in Khanty-Mansiysk in June 2017, a bronze medal at the 43rd Chess Olympiad in Batumi in October 2018 and a gold medal at the World Team Championship in Astana in March 2019.

In 2016 Filatov was awarded a title of FIDE Senior trainer.

On 20 July 2018, Andrey Filatov announced the national team roster for the upcoming World Chess Olympiad in Batumi. The Olympiad became historically unprecedented by gathering the world's strongest chess teams. The Russian men's national team won bronze in the competition.

Filatov is collecting pieces of art – painting, graphic works, and sculpture as well. In his collection are works of such painters as Igor Grabar, Pyotr Konchalovsky, Konstantin Korovin, Gely Korzhev, Viktor Popkov, Arkady Plastov, Nicolai Fechin, and Aleksandr Laktionov. The collection started with Portrait of the engraver J.Watts by Nikolai Fechin. This portrait in 1924 won the Thomas R. Procter prize of the National Academy of Design in the USA. Andrey Filatov's favorite painter is Viktor Popkov.

In 2014, Filatov became the owner of Château La Grace Dieu Des Prieurs, a French winemaker situated in Saint-Emilion, part of the Bordeaux winemaking region. The renowned oenological consultant Louis Mitjavile was invited to improve the winemaking process, while Jean Nouvel, one of the best-known French architects, created a unique design for the renovated château. Since 2017 the wine is branded as Art Russe Grand Cru and the wine label design includes reproductions of works from the Art Russe fund collection. In March 2021, Сuvée Elena by Chateau La Grace Dieu des Prieurs won the international design competition Red Dot Award in the Product Design category, subcategory Beverage Packaging. In June 2022, the wine-and-chess case based on the design idea of Andrey Filatov, won a prize of A' Design Award and Competition in the Packaging Design category.

On 3 February 2018, Andrey Filatov was re-elected RCF President by the XIII Congress of the Russian Chess Federation.

In June 2020, Filatov offered to acquire the monument to Theodore Roosevelt in New York City and the monument to Alexander Baranov in Sitka, AK, in the event that a decision was made to remove them.

In August 2020, the Russian national team took gold in the first-ever FIDE Online Chess Olympiad. in September 2021, team Russia won second FIDE Online Olympiad.

In April 2022, resolution by the Ministry of Sport of the Russian Federation awards Filatov the title of "Merited Coach of Russia".

On 17 December 2022, Filatov was re-elected as CFR President.

On 15 May 2023, he was appointed Vice President of the Afro-Asian Chess Association (AACA)

=== Art Russe Fund ===
In 2012, Andrey Filatov established the Filatov Family Art Fund, to collect Russian and Soviet paintings and sculptures found abroad.

In June 2014, the Filatov Family Art Fund announced that it was rebranding to Art Russe as it prepared to open a new museum in London. Art Russe would continue the work of the Filatov Family Art Fund, but would take on a broader role, with the focus shifting from collecting art to showing the world the breadth and depth of the talent that thrived in Russia.

On 29 July 2014, Art Russe became a Patron of the Serpentine Galleries, one of London's leading art galleries. The agreement demonstrates Art Russe's commitment to supporting international galleries, museums and exhibitions, as it planned to launch its own museum in London.

To mark the 70th anniversary of Victory in Europe, in spring 2015 Art Russe arranged the art exhibition The Legacy of World War II in Russian Art at the Saatchi Gallery, London. The exhibition featured paintings and sculptures, most of which had never before been on public display in the UK, including Alexander Laktionov's Letter from the Front; the Tkachev brothers' By the Well; Igor Obrosov's Wartime Moscow 1941; Ivan Penteshin's The Defence of Leningrad; Evsey Moiseenko's Freedom; Gely Korzhev's The Reunion and Mai Danzig's monumental canvas And the World Remembers the Saviours.

Foundation Art Russe became a Major Funder of the exhibition Astronauts: The Birth of the Space Age, which opened on 17 September 2015 at London's Science Museum. Several rare pieces of space hardware relating to the Soviet space program, which had not travelled outside of Russia before, were brought to London for the exhibition, which also toured internationally, including to Moscow. Among the objects were R-7 ballistic missile engines, R-7 "Vostok 6 spacecraft", which carried the world's first woman cosmonaut Valentina Tereshkova into space, personal belongings of astronauts, the objects of their everyday life on board, and even a shower stall.

Art Russe has organized the first major exhibition of Russian and Soviet art of the twentieth century in the Middle East, which opened on 6 October 2015 in the capital of the United Arab Emirates, Abu Dhabi. The exhibition, entitled Art Russe Collection of 20th Century Russian and Soviet art Art of the XX century Art Russe: War and Peace and including more than 120 works, takes place under the patronage of the Minister of Culture, Youth and Social Development of the United Arab Emirates Sheikh Nahyan bin Mubarak Al Nahyan. The exhibition ran until February 2016.

In February 2016, the painting Freedom! by Evsey Moiseenko was transferred to the exhibition at Yad Vashem, Israel's national memorial to the victims and heroes of the Holocaust, for a period of 15 years.

In June 2016, the fund signed an agreement with the Montagu family to open a new permanent gallery of Russian art at Beaulieu, in Hampshire.

In August 2016, Art Russe funded the creation of a tapestry to be woven from a watercolour painting by Prince Charles, Duke of Rothesay at Dovecot Studios in Edinburgh.
