= Enamel paint =

Paint with a glossy finish that dries hard

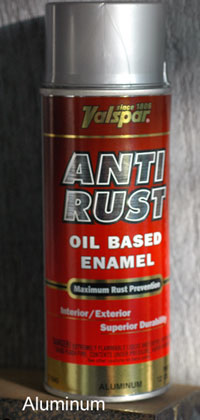
Spray can with enamel paint

Enamel paint is paint that air-dries to a hard, usually glossy, finish, used for coating surfaces that are outdoors or otherwise subject to hard wear or variations in temperature; it should not be confused with decorated objects in "painted enamel", where vitreous enamel is applied with brushes and fired in a kiln. The name is something of a misnomer, as in reality most commercially available enamel paints are significantly softer than either vitreous enamel or stoved synthetic resins, and are totally different in composition; vitreous enamel is applied as a powder or paste and then fired at high temperature. There is no generally accepted definition or standard for use of the term "enamel paint", and not all enamel-type paints may use it.

== Paint ==
Typically the term "enamel paint" is used to describe oil-based covering products, usually with a significant amount of gloss in them, however recently many latex or water-based paints have adopted the term as well. The term today means "hard surfaced paint" and usually is in reference to paint brands of higher quality, floor coatings of a high gloss finish, or spray paints. Most enamel paints are alkyd resin based. Some enamel paints have been made by adding varnish to oil-based paint.

Although "enamels" and "painted enamel" in art normally refer to vitreous enamel, in the 20th century some artists used commercial enamel paints in art, including Pablo Picasso (mixing it with oil paint), Hermann-Paul, Jackson Pollock, and Sidney Nolan. The Trial (1947) is one of a number of works by Nolan to use enamel paint, usually Ripolin, a commercial paint not intended for art, also Picasso's usual brand. Some "enamel paints" are now produced specifically for artists.

Enamels paints can also refer to nitrocellulose based paints, one of the first modern commercial paints of the 20th century. They have since been superseded by new synthetic coatings like alkyd, acrylic and vinyl, due to toxicity, safety, and conservation (tendency to age yellow) concerns. In art has been used also by Pollock with the commercial paint named Duco. The artist experimented and created with many types of commercial or house paints during his career. Other artists: "after discovering various types of industrial materials produced in the United States in the 1930s, David Alfaro Siqueiros produced most of his easel works with uncommon materials which include Duco paint, a DuPont brand name for pyroxyline paint, a tough and resilient type of nitro-cellulose paint manufactured for the automotive industry". Nitro-cellulose enamels are also commonly known as modern lacquers. Enamel paint comes in a variety of hues and can be custom blended to produce a particular tint. It is also available in water-based and solvent-based formulations, with solvent-based enamel being more prevalent in industrial applications. For the greatest results, use a high-quality brush, roller, or spray gun when applying enamel paint. When dried, enamel paint forms a durable, hard-wearing surface that resists chipping, fading, and discoloration, making it a great choice for a wide range of surfaces and applications.

== Uses and categories ==
- Floor enamel – May be used for concrete, stairs, basements, porches, and patios.
- Fast dry enamel – Can dry within 10–15 minutes of application. Ideal for refrigerators, counters, and other industrial finishes.
- High-temp enamel – May be used for engines, brake calipers, exhaust pipe and BBQs.
- Enamel paint is also used on wood to make it resistant to the elements via the waterproofing and rotproofing properties of enamel. Generally, treated surfaces last much longer and are much more resistant to wear than untreated surfaces.
- Model building – Xtracolor and Humbrol are mainstream UK brands. Colourcoats model paint is a high quality brand with authentic accurate military colours. Testors, a US company, offers the Floquil, Pactra, Model Master and Testors brands.
- Nail enamel – to color nails, it comes in many varieties for fast drying, color retention, gloss retention, etc.
- Epoxy enamel, polyurethane enamel, etc. used in protective coating / industrial painting purpose in chemical and petrochemical industries for anti-corrosion purposes.
