= The Franco-Russian Chamber of Commerce and Industry =

Nonprofit association in Eastern Hemisphere

The Franco-Russian Chamber of Commerce
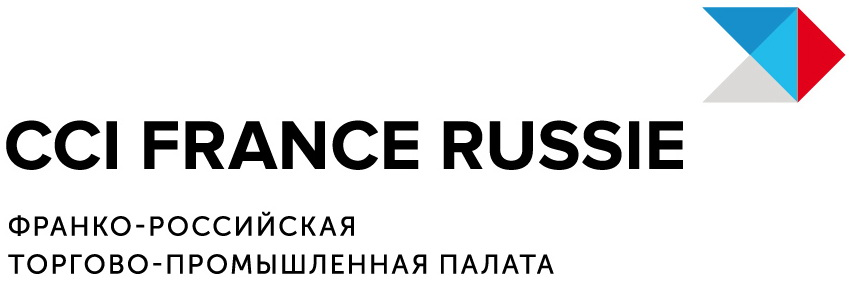
- Abbreviation: CCI France Russie
- Formation: 1997; 29 years ago
- Headquarters: Moscow, Russia
- Region served: Russia and France
- Website: www.ccifr.ru

CCI France Russie is a nonprofit association that represents and promotes economic interests of its Franco-Russian member companies. Today it brings together more than 400 French, Russian and other international companies from 40 sectors of the economy. The Franco-Russian Chamber of Commerce and Industry stands for tighter relations between France and Russia, for a constant dialogue between the two countries and for the development of common projects.

== History ==
CCI France Russie is present in Moscow since 1997 as the “Club France” Association. In 2006, the association joined the CCI France International group - the first network of French companies in the world, gathering more than 35,000 companies in 92 countries.

== Activity ==
Its work focuses on 3 key areas:

- Building business community: organization and staging of sectoral committees, business presentations and B2B meetings, cultural events and regional delegations;
- GR: consultations and dialogues with French and Russian private and public policy makers;
- Supporting companies: support for Russian investments in France and for establishing foreign businesses in Russia, support for commercial development, business visa and work permit arrangement, outstaffing.

== See also ==
- International Chamber of Commerce
