= Sidney Nolan =

Australian artist (1917–1992)

Sir Sidney Nolan OM AC CBE RA
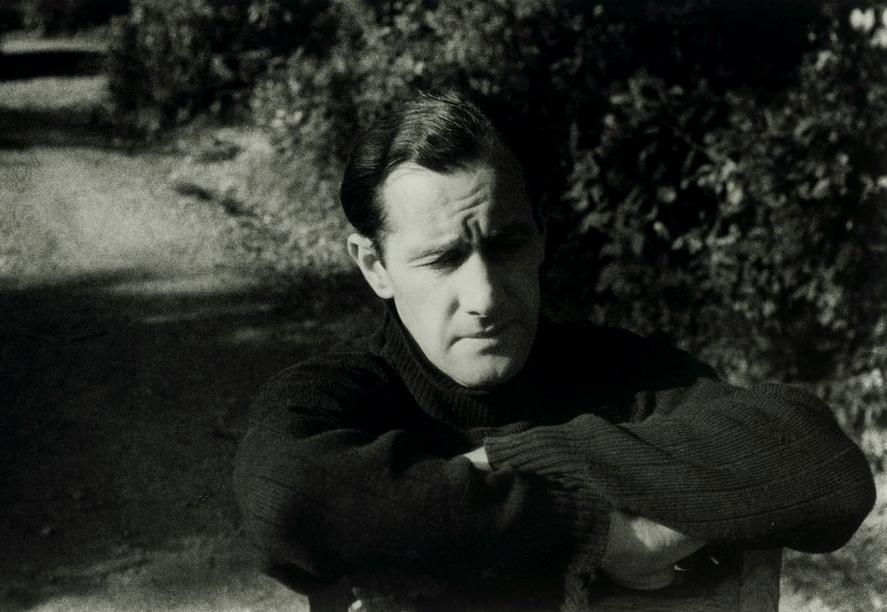
- Sidney Nolan, 1940s, by Albert Tucker
- Born: Sidney Robert Nolan; 22 April 1917; Carlton, Victoria, Australia
- Died: 28 November 1992 (aged 75); London, England
- Known for: Painting
- Movement: Angry Penguins
- Patrons: John Reed, Sunday Reed

Sir Sidney Robert Nolan (22 April 1917 – 28 November 1992) was one of the leading Australian artists of the 20th century. Working in a wide variety of media, his oeuvre is among the most diverse and prolific in all of modern art. He is best known for his series of paintings on legends from Australian history, most famously that of Ned Kelly, the bushranger and outlaw. Nolan's stylised depiction of Kelly's armour has become an icon of Australian art.

== Biography ==
=== Early life ===
Sidney Nolan was born in Carlton, at that time an inner working-class suburb of Melbourne, on 22 April 1917. He was the eldest of four children. His parents, Sidney (a tram driver) and Dora, were both fifth generation Australians of Irish descent. Nolan later moved with his family to the bayside suburb of St Kilda. He attended the Brighton Road State School and then Brighton Technical School and left school aged 14. He enrolled at the Prahran Technical College (now part of Swinburne University of Technology), Department of Design and Crafts, in a course which he had already begun part-time by correspondence. In 1933, at the age of 16, he began working for Fayrefield Hats, Abbotsford, producing advertising and display stands with spray paints and dyes for six years. In 1934, he attended night classes sporadically at the National Gallery of Victoria Art School.

=== Years at Heide (1941–1947) ===
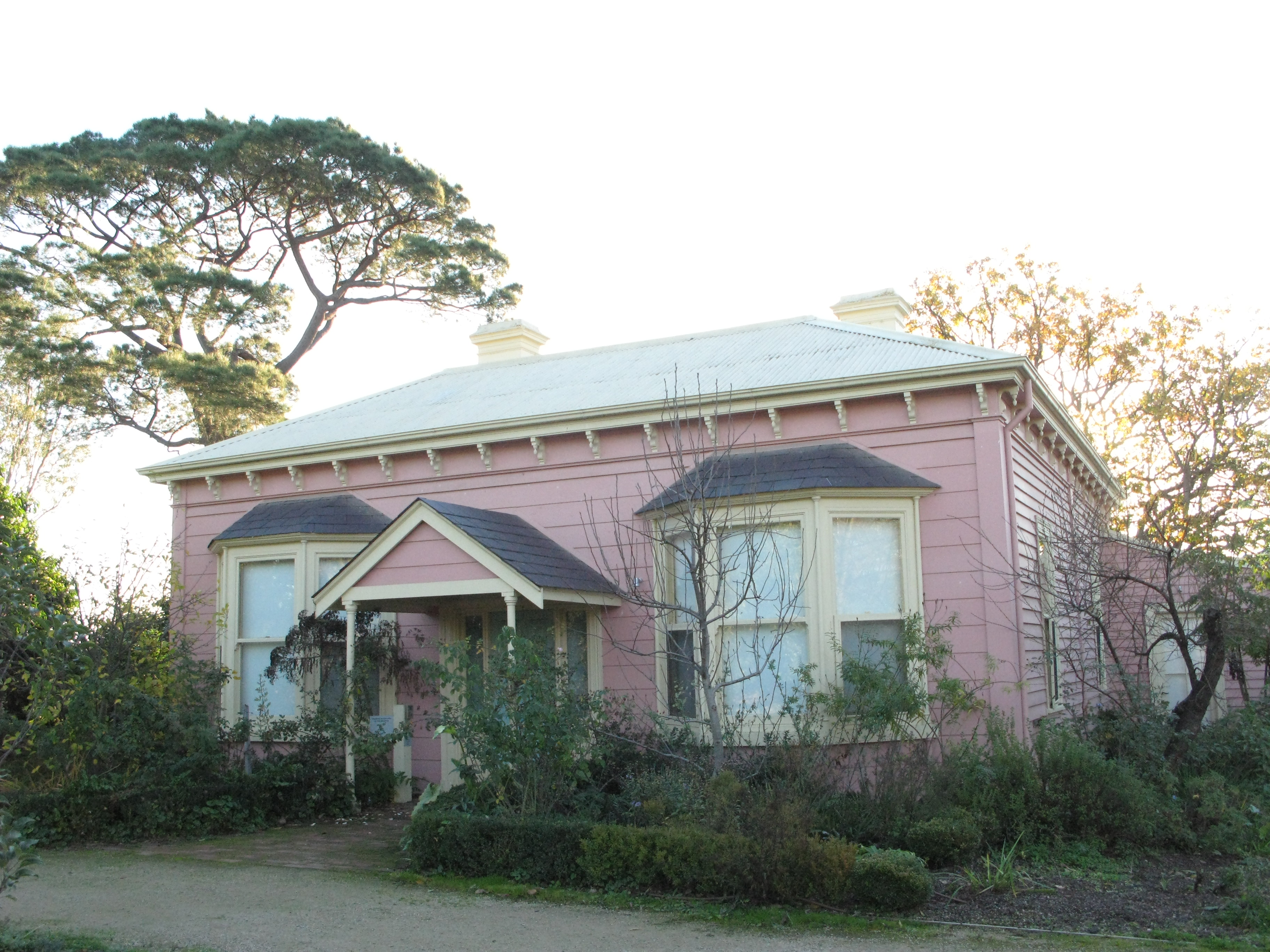
Heide I, where Nolan painted the majority of his early Ned Kelly works

Nolan was a close friend of the arts patrons John and Sunday Reed, and is regarded as one of the leading figures of the so-called "Heide Circle" that also included Albert Tucker, Joy Hester, Arthur Boyd and John Perceval. Boyd and Perceval were members of the Boyd artistic family who were centred at "Open Country", Murrumbeena.

In 1938, he met and married his first wife, graphic designer Elizabeth Paterson, with whom he had a daughter, but his marriage soon broke up because of his increasing involvement with the Reeds. He joined the Angry Penguins in the 1940s, after deserting from the army during World War II; he was an editor of the Angry Penguins magazine and painted the cover for the Ern Malley edition published in June 1944. The Ern Malley hoax poems were seen by Nolan and Sunday Reed as being uncannily prescient in touching on their own personal circumstances. The Malley poems remained a real presence to him throughout his life. He painted and drew hundreds of Malley-themed works and in 1975 said it inspired him to paint his first Ned Kelly series: "It made me take the risk of putting against the Australian bush an utterly strange object."

He lived for some time at the Reeds' home, "Heide" outside Melbourne (now the Heide Museum of Modern Art). Here he painted the first of his famous, iconic "Ned Kelly" series, reportedly with input from Sunday Reed. Nolan also conducted an open affair with Sunday Reed but subsequently married John Reed's sister, Cynthia in 1948 after Sunday refused to leave her husband. The marriage between Nolan and Cynthia caused a painful rift with John and his wife Sunday and, after an unsuccessful visit from the newlyweds in March 1948, Nolan would never see his first and most important patrons again. The years there together have been seen as a dominating factor in the subsequent lives of them all.

In November 1976, Cynthia Nolan ended her life by taking an overdose of sleeping pills in a London hotel. In 1978, Nolan married Mary Boyd (1926–2016), youngest daughter within the Boyd family and previously married to John Perceval, who was the last surviving member of the Angry Penguins at the time of his death in October 2000.

=== Career ===
The Trial, held at the National Gallery of Australia, is one of 27 paintings comprising Nolan's 1946–47 Ned Kelly series.

Nolan painted a wide range of personal interpretations of historical and legendary figures, including explorers Burke and Wills, and Eliza Fraser. With time his paintings of Mrs Fraser came to be associated with his growing animus towards Sunday Reed. However, when first painted he was still on good terms with the Reeds and sent them photos of the works for their approval. Indeed, he gave one Fraser Island painting to Sunday Reed as a Christmas gift that year.

Probably his most famous work is a series of stylised descriptions of the bushranger Ned Kelly in the Australian bush. Nolan left the famous 1946–47 series of 27 Ned Kellys at "Heide", when he left it in emotionally charged circumstances. Although he once wrote to Sunday Reed to tell her to take what she wanted, he subsequently demanded all his works back. Sunday Reed returned 284 other paintings and drawings to Nolan, but she refused to give up the 25 remaining Kellys, partly because she saw the works as fundamental to the proposed Heide Museum of Modern Art and also, possibly, because she collaborated with Nolan on the paintings. Eventually, she gave them to the National Gallery of Australia in 1977 and this resolved the dispute. Nolan's Ned Kelly series follows the main sequence of the Kelly story. However, Nolan did not intend the series to be an authentic depiction of these events. Rather, these episodes/series became the setting for the artist's meditations upon universal themes of injustice, love and betrayal. The Kelly saga was also a way for Nolan to paint the Australian landscape in new ways, with the story giving meaning to the place.

Although the Depression and World War II occurred during that period, Nolan decided to concentrate on something other than people struggling in life. Nolan wanted to create and define episodes in Australian nationalism, to retell the story of a hero, who now has become a metaphor for humankind, the fighter, the victim, and the hero, resisting tyranny with a passion for freedom. Nolan recognised that the conceptual image of the black square (Kelly's helmet and armour) had been part of modern art since World War I. He just placed a pair of eyes in Kelly's helmet, which animates its formal shape. In most of the series, Kelly's steel head-guard dominates the composition. Nolan also concentrates on the Australian outback and shows a different landscape in nearly every painting. The paintings give the audience an insight into the history of Australia but also show others from the world how beautiful Australia is. The intensity of the colours of the land and bush, along with its overall smooth texture, help create harmony between legend, symbol and visual impact. Kelly is in the centre of the painting but the colours around him help make him stand out. It's a very simplistic composition, but highlights that Ned Kelly is an Australian icon.

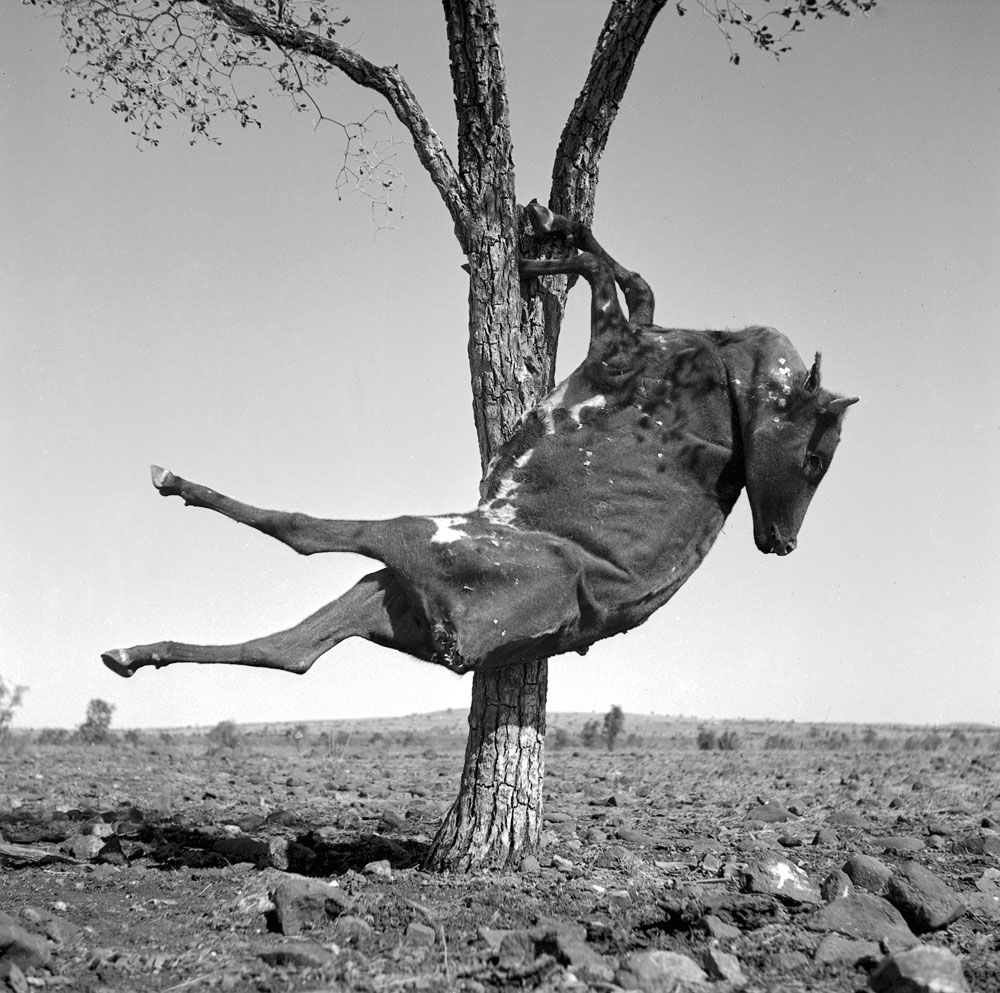
In 1952, Nolan documented the effects of drought in outback Queensland. His photographs of desiccated animals were a catalyst for his later drought paintings.

Nolan never relied upon one style or technique, but rather experimented throughout his lifetime with many different methods of application, and also devised some of his own. Nolan was inspired by children's art and modernist painting of the early 20th century. During this time many younger artists were veering towards abstraction, but Nolan remained committed to the figurative potential of painting. In terms of art history, Nolan rediscovered the Australian landscape (Australia has not been an easy country to paint). His love of literature is seen as visually evident in his work. Other key influences were the modernist artists such as Paul Cézanne, Pablo Picasso, Henri Matisse and Henri Rousseau. Locally, the arrival of the Russian artist Danila Vassilieff in Melbourne in the mid-1930s, with his simple and direct art, was significant for Nolan.

In his series, Kelly is a metaphor for Nolan himself. Nolan, like the bushranger, was a fugitive from the law. In July 1944, facing the possibility that he would be sent to Papua New Guinea on front-line duty, Nolan went absent without leave from the army. He adopted the alias Robin Murray, a name suggested by Sunday Reed, whose affectionate nickname for him was "Robin Redbreast". So when he created the Kelly series, he viewed himself as the misunderstood hero/artist, like the protagonist, Kelly. "Nolan like this Kelly figure has also been a hero, a victim, a man who armoured himself against Australia and who faced it, conquered it, lost it…. ambiguity personified."

Nolan's Ned Kelly series is one of the greatest sequences of Australian paintings of the 20th century. His simplified depiction of Kelly in his armour has become an iconic Australian image. In 1949, when the series was exhibited at the Musée National d'Art Moderne in Paris, the museum's director Jean Cassou called the works "a striking contribution to modern art" and that Nolan "creates in us a wonder of something new being born". Works from Nolan's second Kelly series (ca. mid-1950s) were acquired by major international galleries, including the Museum of Modern Art in New York and the Tate Modern in London. English critic Robert Melville wrote in 1963 that Nolan's Kelly belonged to "the company of twentieth-century personages which includes Picasso's minotaur, Chirico's mannequins, Ernst's birdmen, Bacon's popes and Giacometti's walking man".

Paintings of Dimboola landscapes by Sidney Nolan, who was stationed in the area while on army duty in World War II, can be found in the National Gallery of Victoria.

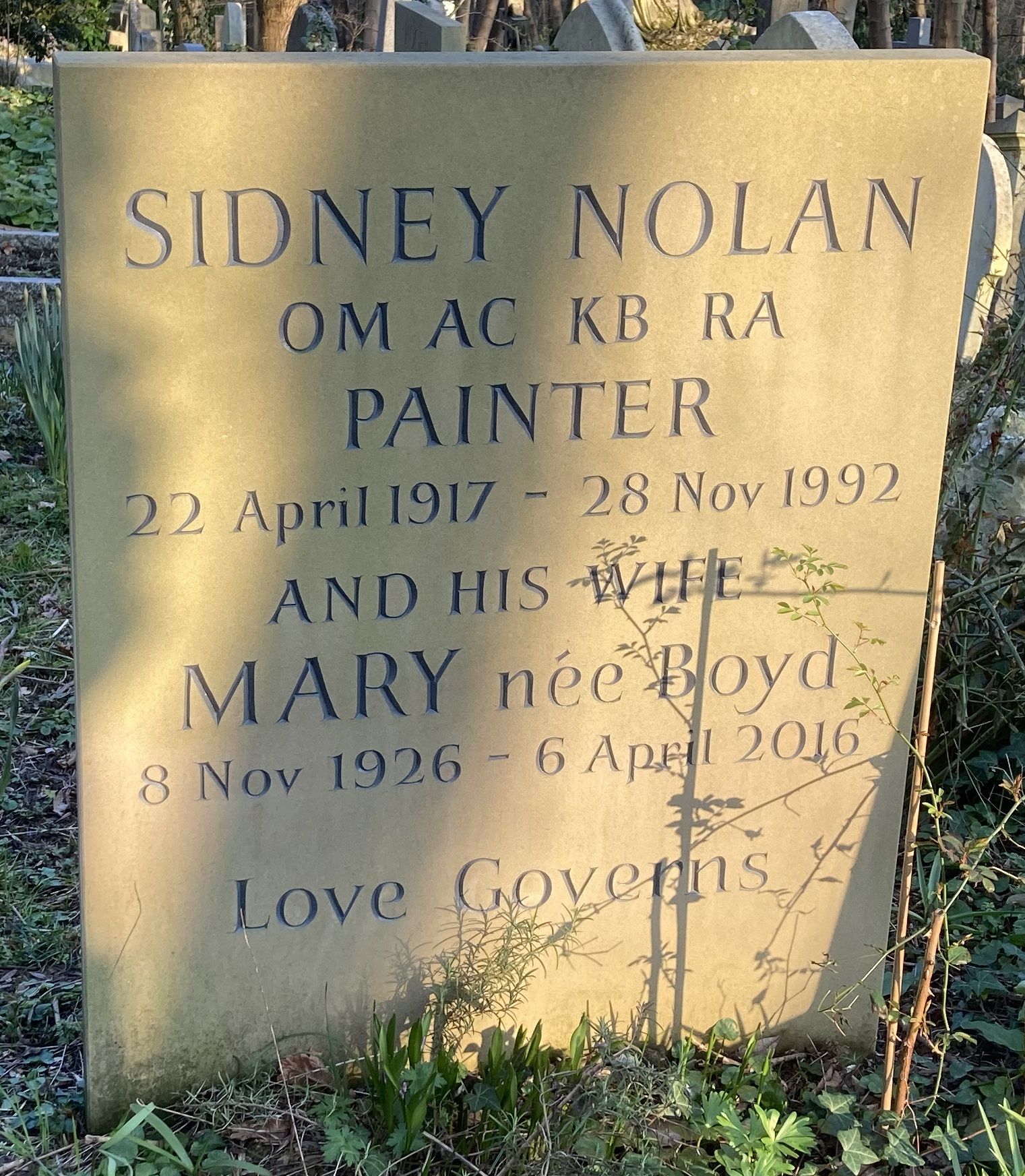
Grave of Sidney Nolan in Highgate Cemetery

In 1951, Nolan moved to London, England. He travelled in Europe, spending a year in 1956 painting themes based on Greek Mythology while in Greece. In Paris, he studied engraving and lithography with S. W. Hayter at Studio 17t two years there. He became friends with the poet Robert Lowell and produced illustrations for some of his books. Nolan was a prolific book cover illustrator, his images enhancing the dust jackets of over 70 publications. During this period, Nolan's first London solo exhibition occurred at the Whitechapel Gallery between June and July 1957.

In 1961, Nolan painted a significant series of over 250 Auschwitz works, only recently re-discovered, researched and documented by Nolan scholar Andrew Turley. The paintings were Nolan's response to the 1960 capture, and subsequent trial, of Nazi Adolf Eichmann when worldwide media attention reignited awareness of the atrocities committed by Nazi Germany during WWII. Nolan subsequently travelled behind the Iron Curtain to Auschwitz on 29 January 1962, at the invitation of Jewish journalist Al Alvarez and Britain's The Observer newspaper. He intended to illustrate an article on the concentration camps by Alvarez but was so overwhelmed by the experience he declined to fulfil the commission on his return. The August 2021 exhibition of Holocaust paintings at the Sidney Nolan Trust in Presteigne (United Kingdom), was the first time Nolan's long-hidden Auschwitz work was publicly exhibited, and the first time their dramatic story was told in its entirety.

In 1965, Nolan completed a large mural (20 m by 3.6 m) depicting the 1854 Eureka Stockade, rendered in jewellery enamel on 1.5 tonnes of heavy gauge copper. Nolan employed the "finger-and-thumb" drawing technique of Indigenous Australian sandpainters to create the panoramic scene. Commissioned by economist H. C. Coombs, the mural is located at the entrance to the Reserve Bank of Australia's Melbourne office on Collins Street.

During the period of 1968–1970, Nolan embarked on the creation of a monumental mural entitled Paradise Garden. The project consisted of 1,320 floral designs split into three subsections that were created using crayons and dyes. The intent of the subsections was to show the lifecycles of plants, starting with the primeval plants emerging from the mud, transitioning to their full burst of colour in springtime, and the completion of the life cycle with the withering plants returning to the earth.

In England, Nolan attended the Aldeburgh Festival and was encouraged by the organiser and composer Benjamin Britten to show paintings at the festivals. He continued to travel widely in Europe, Africa, China and Australia, and even went to Antarctica.

=== Death ===
Nolan died in London on 28 November 1992 at the age of 75, survived by his wife and two children. He was buried in the eastern part of Highgate Cemetery, London.

== Work ==
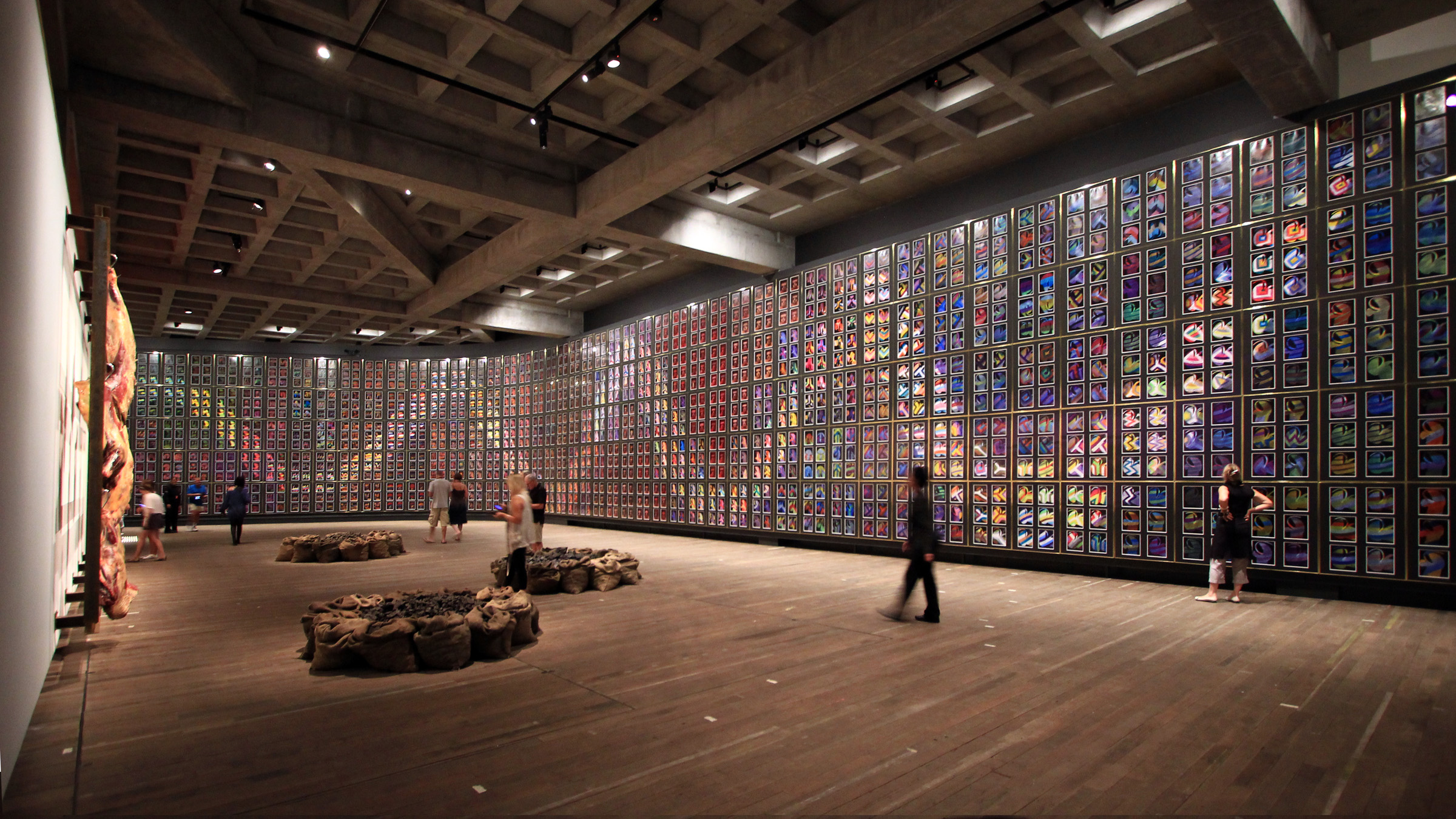
The Museum of Old and New Art in Hobart, Tasmania, was built to accommodate Nolan's Snake (1970–72), a giant Rainbow Serpent mural made of 1,620 individual paintings.

=== Stage designs ===
Nolan's lifelong engagement with the theatre began in 1939 when he was commissioned to create décor for French ballet dancer Serge Lifar's revised version of Icare. Lifar, then on tour in Australia with the Original Ballet Russe, offered Nolan the job after a chance encounter with his abstract work. Icare premiered on 16 February 1940 at the Theatre Royal in Sydney.

In 1964, Robert Helpmann enlisted Nolan to design the set and costumes for his ballet The Display. Set at a bush picnic, the piece relates the mating rituals of the lyrebird to the masculine posturing of Australian males. Nolan created a series of green-blue gauze panels to evoke the filtered light of the forest. One contemporary critic remarked that Nolan's décor "not merely recreates the haunt of the lyrebird. It is the deep, rich mysterious gloom of a sunlight-shafted Australian rainforest with the pillars of its ghostly white gums rising through its depths."

In London, he created the designs for Kenneth MacMillan's The Rite of Spring (1962) at the Royal Ballet, and for Saint-Saëns' Samson et Dalila (1981) and Mozart's Die Entführung aus dem Serail (1987), directed by Elijah Moshinsky at the Royal Opera. Only The Rite of Spring remains in the repertory.

== Honours and awards ==
In the 1963 New Year Honours List, Nolan was appointed CBE. In the 1981 Birthday Honours List, Nolan was appointed a Knight Bachelor for service to art. He received the Order of Merit (OM) in 1983. In 1983, Nolan settled in Herefordshire. The Sidney Nolan Trust, chaired by Lord Lipsey, was established in 1985 to support artists and musicians, and provide exhibition space for works by Nolan and others at The Rodd, north of Kington, Herefordshire.

He was made a Companion of the Order of Australia (AC) in 1988 having declined being made an Officer in 1975. In 1975, Sir John Kerr, the then Governor-General, wrote to the Queen's then Private Secretary, Sir Martin Charteris, to inform him of Nolan's decision to decline. Kerr indicated in his letter that he thought Nolan should have been offered the rank of Companion instead and that he had intended to convey his view to Sir Garfield Barwick, the inaugural Chair of the Order of Australia Council, but that Barwick had already sent Nolan the letter asking whether he would decline the honour of AO. Kerr speculated to Charteris that, having been made CBE in the 1960s, being made an AO, "...may have seemed to him no great advancement."

He was also elected an honorary member of the American Academy of Arts and Letters and a member of the Royal Academy of Arts.

=== Appraisal ===
British businessman Alistair McAlpine (1942–2014), who knew Nolan personally and was a collector of his art, wrote of his style in a 2002 memoir:

His landscape is the hard landscape of Australia, not the Sunday bush of the colloquial painter. His people are the men and women of adversity and the Aboriginals of desolate bush and haunting ceremonies. There is a toughness and a directness in these paintings, often rushed out from a night of frenzied painting (..) Living in London, he painted Australia even when the subject was Greece or Italy. There was no aesthetic that Sidney Nolan was not prepared to prey upon in aid of his Australian paintings.

== Legacy ==
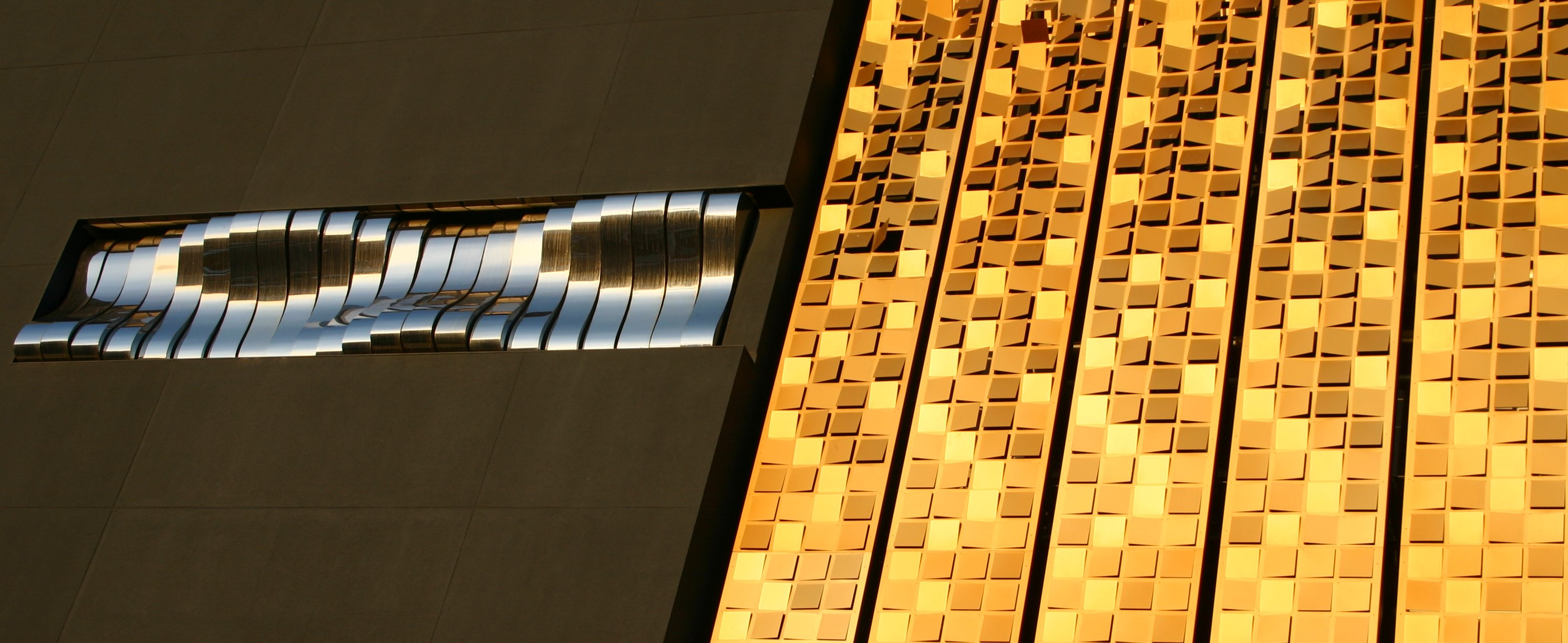
Detail of the three-dimensional frieze at the base of the Nolan apartment building in Docklands, Melbourne, inspired by Nolan's abstracted depiction of Ned Kelly's helmet and the Australian landscape

During the Tin Symphony segment of the 2000 Summer Olympics opening ceremony, a multitude of performers donned stylised costumes based on Nolan's distinctive Ned Kelly imagery, and a painting from Nolan's original 1946–47 Ned Kelly series was displayed on a giant screen in the stadium.

In 2010, First-class Marksman (1946) became the most expensive Australian painting ever sold. Dubbed "the missing Nolan", the painting was the only one in Nolan's first series of 27 Ned Kelly paintings not in the collection of the National Gallery of Australia. It was purchased by the Art Gallery of New South Wales for $5.4 million.

The cinematography for English film director Nicolas Roeg's 1971 Australian film Walkabout was heavily influenced by Nolan. The small boy's hallucination of camel riders in the desert was a direct reference to Nolan's Burke and Wills paintings.

Two of Nolan's paintings, The Abandoned Mine (1948) and Ned Kelly (1955) were included in Quintessence Editions Ltd.'s 2007 book 1001 Paintings You Must See Before You Die.

Melbourne writer Steven Carroll's 2011 novel Spirit of Progress is inspired by Woman and Tent (1946) by Nolan, who based the painting on Carroll's eccentric great-aunt. The young artist in the novel, Sam, is based on Nolan. Nolan's relationship with Sunday Reed provided the framework for Alex Miller's 2011 novel Autumn Laing.

Nolan was to have been the subject of a film titled When We Were Modern, directed by Philippe Mora and starring Clayton Watson. In 2013, Mora's film Absolutely Modern premiered, with Watson portraying Nolan. Based on 1940s Heide, it concerns Modernism, the female muse and the role of sexuality in Art.

David Rainey's 2014 play "The Ménage at Soria Moria" is a fictitious performance piece exploring the relationship between Nolan and the Reeds – both the heady days at Heide during the 1940s, and the less well known degeneration over the next 35 years.

Several documentary films have been made about Nolan. This Dreaming, Spinning Thing was commissioned by ABCTV as a companion film to Nolan's 1967 retrospective exhibition at the Art Gallery of New South Wales. It was made with a script by Australian novelist George Johnston. Kelly Country (1972), directed by Stuart Cooper with commentary by Orson Welles, explores Australia's landscape and folklore through Nolan's imagery. Nolan's Paradise Garden poems and drawings are examined in British director Jonathan Gili's 1974 film of the same name. A 2009 documentary by filmmaker Catherine Hunter, Mask and Memory charts the course of Nolan's personal life, including his complex relationship with the Reeds at Heide. Narrated by Judy Davis, the film concludes that the three main women in Nolan's life, Sunday Reed, Cynthia Nolan and Mary Nolan, played bigger roles in the development of his art than is often discussed.

Among Australian artists, Nolan's estate was identified as the third largest in Australia in 2013, following those of Brett Whiteley and Russell Drysdale.

== See also ==
- Australian art

== Bibliography ==
- Adams, Brian (1987). Sidney Nolan: Such is Life - A Biography. Hawthorn, Vic: Hutchinson of Australia. ISBN 0-0915-7360-2.
- Adams, Brian (2015). Sidney Nolan's Odyssey: A Life. CreateSpace Independent Publishing Platform. ISBN 9781511713870.
- Fallowell, Duncan, 20th Century Characters, ch. Going Round the Rodd: Sir Sidney and Lady Nolan in Herefordshire, (London, Vintage Books, 1994)
- James, Rodney (2006). Sidney Nolan: Antarctic Journey. Mornington, Vic.: Mornington Peninsula Regional Gallery. ISBN 0-9757825-3-3.
- Lynn, Elwyn; Nolan, Sidney (1979). Sidney Nolan--Australia. Sydney: Bay Books. ISBN 0-85835-314-8.
- McCaughey, Patrick, ed. (2006). Bert & Ned: The Correspondence of Albert Tucker and Sidney Nolan. Carlton, Vic.: Melbourne University Publishing. ISBN 0-522-85261-0.
- McGuire, Margaret E. (2016). Cynthia Nolan: A Biography. Melbourne: Melbourne Books. ISBN 9781922129963.
- Pearce, Barry (2007). Sidney Nolan. Sydney: Art Gallery of New South Wales. ISBN 978-1-74174-013-4.
- Rosenthal, T.G. (2002). Sidney Nolan. London: Thames & Hudson. ISBN 0-500-09304-0.
- Sayers, Andrew; Bail, Murray (2002). Sidney Nolan's Ned Kelly: The Ned Kelly paintings in the National Gallery of Australia. Canberra: National Gallery of Australia. ISBN 0-642-54201-5.
- Smith, Geoffrey (2003). Sidney Nolan: Desert & Drought. Melbourne: National Gallery of Victoria. ISBN 0-7241-0220-5.
- Underhill, Nancy, ed. (2007). Nolan on Nolan: Sidney Nolan in His Own Words. Camberwell, Vic: Viking. ISBN 978-0-670-04047-6.
- Underhill, Nancy (2015). Sidney Nolan: A Life. Sydney: NewSouth Publishing. ISBN 9781921410888.
