= Chess Federation of Russia =

Governing body for chess in Russia

- Федерация шахмат России
- Abbreviation: CFR
- Predecessor: USSR Chess Federation
- Formation: February 15, 1992
- Headquarters: Moscow
- Region served: Russia
- President: Andrey Filatov
- Affiliations: FIDE, Asian Chess Federation
- Website: ruchess.ru/en/
- Formerly called: Russian Chess Federation

The Chess Federation of Russia (Russian: Федерация шахмат России, romanized: Federatsiya shakhmat Rossiyi), known until 2018 as the Russian Chess Federation, (Russian: Российская Шахматная Федерация, romanized: Rossiyskaya Shakhmatnaya Federatsiya) is the governing body for chess in Russia, and the officially recognized arm of the FIDE in Russia. It was founded on 15 February 1992, following the dissolution of the USSR Chess Federation. Its headquarters are in Moscow. The president is Andrey Filatov, who was elected in 2014. The structure of the Russian Chess Federation consists of three governing bodies: the Congress, the supervisory board, and the board of management.

== History ==
The Chess Federation of Russia (CFR) is the successor of the supreme chess governing body of USSR. The first congress of CFR took place in February 1992, electing the president of CFR between Economist Leonid Abalkin and politician Arkady Murashov, the latter of whom held the position of the head of the Moscow City Police and a member of the Democratic Party of Russia together with World Chess Champion Garry Kasparov. Kasparov supported Murashov's candidacy, and Murashov won the election.

As the aftermath of the election USSR grandmasters Anatoly Karpov, Mikhail Botvinnik, Vasily Smyslov, and Mikhail Tal founded an alternative chess organization, the Association of Chess Federations, which included almost all former Soviet chess federations, excluding Russian. At the end of the 30th Chess Olympiad in 1992, a member of the Presidium of the CFR, Yevgeny Bebchuk, initiated an extraordinary congress, where he was elected as the next president of the CFR. Bebchuk got support from Kasparov's opposition, including Karpov and Botvinnik. In April 1994, as a result of another conflict, the Congress elected a new Bureau and a new president—Andrey Makarov, a lawyer and deputy of the State Duma.

Since 2010, the federation abolished the presidential position and introduced a board of management and a supervisory board, headed by a chairman. In 2014, the XII Federation Congress restored the post of President, as a substitution of the chairman of the supervisory board, and established the board of trustees, inviting renown Russian political figures and businessmen, including Arkady Dvorkovich, Sergei Shoigu, Sergey Sobyanin, Mintimer Shaimiev. Andrey Filatov was elected to the post of President of the CFR and re-elected in 2022. Dmitry Peskov, press secretary of the Russian president, became chairman of the board of trustees.

On 25 September 2014, a chess museum opened in the Russian Chess Federation's mansion.

In the 2021 World Chess Championship match between Magnus Carlsen and Ian Nepomniachtchi, Nepomniachtchi competed under the Chess Federation of Russia flag. Nepomniachtchi is Russian, but the Court of Arbitration for Sport upheld a ban on Russia competing at World Championships, and it is implemented by WADA in response to the state-sponsored doping program of Russian athletes.

In 23 February 2023, with the approval from FIDE, Chess Federation of Russia has switched its regional affiliation from European Chess Union to Asian Chess Federation.

== Administration ==
The Congress is the supreme legislative body of the CFR, held at least once every five years. The Congress elects the federation's the supervisory board, which ensures control over the statutory and economic activities, and reports to the Congress.

The board of management is an elected collegial body that determines the priority areas of the CFR's activities. CFR President leads the board of management: organizes its work, monitors the implementation of the resolutions of the supervisory board and carries out general management of the activities of the CFR. President represents the public interests of the CFR and signs official documents of CFR.

=== Presidents ===
- Arkady Murashov (1992—1993)
- Yevgeny Bebchuk (1993—1994)
- Andrey Makarov (1994—1997)
- Andrey Selivanov (1997—2003)
- Alexander Zhukov (2003—2009; current vice-president)
- Andrey Filatov (2014–present)

=== Chairmen ===
- Arkady Dvorkovich (2010—2014)
- Alexander Bach (2010—2011)
- Ilya Levitov (2011—2014)
