= Nikita Mishin =

Russian billionaire businessman (born 1971)

- Born: August 29, 1971 (age 54); Russia, USSR
- Citizenship: Cyprus; Russia
- Education: Moscow State University

Nikita Mishin (Russian: Никита Мишин; born in August 29, 1971) is a Russian billionaire businessman, who with Konstantin Nikolaev and Andrey Filatov, co-founded Globaltrans, Russia's largest train operator.

== Early life and career ==
Mishin received his bachelor's degree from Moscow State University in 1993.

He is the founder of Severstaltrans, now called N-Trans, and a former member of the Expert Council of Russia, described as "a non-governmental body of advisers". He acquired Cypriot citizenship in 2015.

In December 2017, he sold his shares in Global Ports, exiting the port business. In January 2024, Mishin sold his shares in Globaltrans.

== Personal life ==
Nikita Mishin is married, he has 3 children.

He is the founder of the charity fund "Dar". Fund helps gifted children to study according to modern educational programs.
