= John W. Houghtaling II =

American lawyer

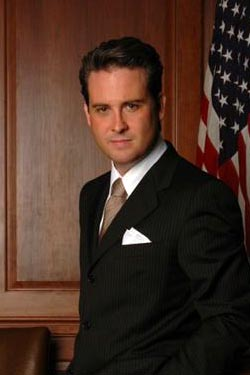
- Born: New Orleans, Louisiana, United States
- Education: Emory University; Loyola University
- Occupation: Attorney

John Houghtaling is an American attorney and oil and gas executive.

== Legal career ==
Houghtaling is the majority owner of Gauthier, Murphy & Houghtaling, a New Orleans law firm. In 2005, Houghtaling served as special counsel to the Attorney General of Louisiana in the litigation of policyholder rights in the wake of Hurricane Katrina.

In 2014, Houghtaling was appointed as plaintiffs liaison counsel by the United States Federal Court for the Eastern District. He uncovered fraud within the FEMA Flood Insurance program which led to the arrest of a key insurance contractor, a seven figure Federal fine against the insurer, and defense counsel, in the NFIP.

== Business ==
In 2014, he co-founded American Ethane Company. Houghtaling has signed conditionally bindings contracts to supply 7.2 million tons a year of ethane to China, a sale volume that exceeds 72 billion dollars.

== Personal life ==
In 2012, Houghtaling married Julia Timonina. They live together in New Orleans with their daughter. Together they own the historic Brown Mansion on St. Charles Avenue.

== Media ==
Houghtaling's career was featured in a documentary on the Inside Man series hosted by Morgan Spurlock. Houghtaling has also been a legal commentator.
