= Ripolin =

Ripolin is a brand of paint. It was the first commercially available brand of enamel paint.

Ripolin, a brand of commercial ready-mixed paints formulated for architectural, marine and other applications, originated in the Netherlands where it was developed by the chemist Carl Julius Ferdinand Riep. In 1897, the Briegleb paint company, as it was then known, formed a partnership with the French firm Lefranc, a manufacturer of artists’ materials. The merged company was named Ripolin, in honor of Riep, and a Ripolin factory was established in France. Ripolin paints became sufficiently renowned during the period that “ripolin” became synonymous with enamel paints in general and entered the French dictionary as early as 1907. Today Ripolin is the property of PPG Industries.

Picasso and Le Corbusier both used Ripolin in their works. The latter's argument against ornamentation and the promotion of the use of white enamel ripolin was famously documented in his Law of Ripolin. In this, he imagined covering the world in the paint: "Imagine the results of the Law of Ripolin. Every citizen is required to replace his hangings, his damasks, his wall-papers, his stencils, with a plain coat of white ripolin. His home is made clean. There are no more dirty, dark corners. Everything is shown as it is."
