= Hermia Boyd =

Australian artist and writer (1931–2000)

- Born: Hermia Sappho Lloyd-Jones; August 10, 1931; Sydney, New South Wales.
- Died: January 25, 2000
- Known for: Pottery, Illustration, Theatre set design and costuming.
- Spouse: David Boyd (artist)
- Children: Amanda Boyd, Lucinda Boyd, Cassandra Boyd.
- Parents: Herman Lloyd-Jones. (father); Erica Lloyd-Jones. (mother)
- Relatives: Clytie Jessop (sister),Merric Boyd (father-in-law), Doris Boyd (mother-in-law); Arthur Boyd, Guy Boyd (brother-in-law); Cressida O'Hanlon (granddaughter)

Hermia Sappho Boyd (née Lloyd-Jones) (1931–2000) was an Australian artist, writer, and a member of the Boyd artistic dynasty.

== Boyd family ==
The Boyd artistic dynasty began with the marriage of Emma Minnie à Beckett (known as Minnie) and Arthur Merric Boyd in 1886. Both were already established as painters at the time of their marriage. Their second-born son Merric Boyd married Doris Gough and had five artistic children, Lucy de Guzman Boyd, Arthur Boyd, Guy Boyd, David Boyd, and Mary Elizabeth Boyd.

In 1948 Hermia Lloyd-Jones joined the Boyd family through marrying David Fielding Gough Boyd. Following the tradition of their family, their three daughters Amanda, Lucinda, and Cassandra are artists.

== Education and early career ==
Born in Sydney in 1931, Hermia Boyd (née Lloyd-Jones) was the daughter of Australian graphic artist Herman Lloyd-Jones and Erica Lloyd-Jones, and the sister of Australian actress, artist, and gallerist Clytie Jessop. Hermia first studied art privately with Joy Ewart, before attending the East Sydney Technical College where she worked under Lyndon Dadswell. While studying she worked part-time at Martin Boyd Pottery with Guy Boyd and David Boyd. In 1952, whilst in France, she studied wood-engraving with Edward Gordon Craig. Early in 1970 while living in the south of France Hermia studied etching with Sathish Sharma.

== David & Hermia Boyd Pottery (1950–1968) ==
In 1950, David and Hermia settled in Sydney to set up their first pottery in a shed based out of Paddington with fellow Australian potter Tom Sanders. Producing a pottery range called Hermia Ware and large individual pieces for exhibition. Hermia Ware went on to inspire other Australian potters including Milton Moon. The couple's pottery style used wheel-thrown earthernware and terracotta clays to create both functional and sculptural forms. David experimented with different glazes including overglaze on porcelain, Italian Majolica, manganese glaze, underglaze, with Hermia often decorating the work using sgraffito techniques and sourcing medieval, Byzantine, Coptic, and Etruscan imagery. The couples potter's marks were usually painted or incised with 'Hermia Ware', 'Hermia', 'Boyd / England', 'D + H Boyd' and 'David + Hermia Boyd'.

Moving to Europe in 1950, the couple established a pottery studio together in London, (Pinner, Middlesex) which was publicized by Hermia's sister and gallerist Cyltie Lloyd-Jones. and another later studio based in the South of France, in the provenance of Tourrettes-sur-Loup. Hermia designed the distinctive figure sign 'Capricornia' for Cyltie Jessop and Joan Keast's Australian art shop in London, which the visiting Australian artist Stephen Briggs painted. By the mid-1950s the Boyds became widely known as leading Australian potters. They continued to work together primarily in pottery through to the mid-1960s. While working in London they were labelled by the British media as the "Golden Couple" of pottery. Moving to Rome in 1961, Hermia and David worked on their pottery practice together in Australia, England and France before closing their last pottery in Murrumbeena in 1968 to concentrate on their respective individual artistic practices. David moved into a painting career, while Hermia focused on etching and sculpture. The couple returned permanently to live and work in Australia from 1971.

== Solo career ==
Boyd pursued a solo artist career before and after the closure of David and Hermia Boyd Pottery, as an illustrator, etcher, costumer and theatre set designer. She designed the curtain of the Royal Theatre in Ballarat and designed all the costuming and sets for the 1958 Lola Montez production at the Elizabethan Theatre which were reputed to have cost £80,000. In 1960, Boyd designed the costuming and set design for Peter O'Shaughnessy's production of "Miss Julie"at the Russell Street Theatre. In 1968 she illustrated the 1st edition cover for Citizens of Mist by Australian author Roger McDonald. In 1971, Boyd had a solo exhibition at South Yarra Gallery Hermia Boyd: Sculptures, Bronzes, drawings and etchings. A retrospective exhibition of her work was held in 1997 at Macquarie University Library, Hermia Boyd: a retrospective exhibition of selected works from 1945-1980.

== Exhibitions ==
- Ceramics by David and Hermia Boyd, 15 August 1949, David Jones "Little Gallery", Sydney
- London Pottery Show David and Hermia Boyd, 1953, Barling's, London
- Pottery by David and Hermia Boyd, 9–12 November 1955, Georges Ltd., Melbourne
- Arthur Boyd Paintings and David and Hermia Boyd Ceramics, 1956, Peter Bray Gallery
- Hermia Boyd: Sculptures, Bronzes, drawings and etchings, 21 November-9 December 1971, South Yarra Gallery
- The Painter as Potter, 4 February-6 March 1983, National Gallery of Victoria
- Hermia Boyd: a retrospective exhibition of selected works from 1945-1980, 12 October-2 November 1997, Macquarie University Library
- Boyd Women, 26 February-14 August 2006, Bundanon Homestead
- Boyd Women, 6 October-10 December 2017, Glen Eira City Council
- Hermia Boyd and Lola Montez: Designing an Australian Gold Rush Musical, 20 January-25 February 2018, Arts Centre Melbourne
- Know My Name: Part Two, 12 June 2021 – 26 June 2022, National Gallery of Australia

== Collections ==
- National Gallery of Australia, Canberra
- National Gallery of Victoria, Melbourne
- QAGOMA, Brisbane
- Macquarie University Library Art Gallery, Sydney
- Art Gallery of New South Wales, Sydney
- Art Gallery of South Australia, Adelaide
- Arts Centre Melbourne Performing Arts Collection, Melbourne
- Victorian College of the Arts, Melbourne

== Activism ==
Boyd signed a letter and was a part of the demonstration in 1966 at Australia House in London protesting the Australian participation in the Vietnam War, alongside figures including David Boyd, Arthur Boyd, actor Leo McKern, composer Malcolm Williams, art gallery director Lesley Stack, painter John Olsen, Morris Hope, art critic Robert Hughes, cartoonist Arthur Horner, TV producer Tom Mainfield and poet Peter Porter. Both Hermia and David were members of the Committee of Australian Artists for Parliamentary Democracy.

== Publications ==
The Pottery and Ceramics of David & Hermia Boyd. (1977) By John Vader.

== Death ==
Hermia died January 25, 2000. David Boyd died aged 87 on November 10, 2011.
