= Lucy de Guzman Boyd =

Australian artist

Lucy Evelyn Gough Beck (née Boyd; 1916–2009) and also known as Lucy Boyd Beck, and Lucy de Guzman Boyd, was an Australian artist and a member of the Boyd artistic dynasty.

== Boyd family ==
The Boyd artistic dynasty began with the marriage of Emma Minnie à Beckett (known as Minnie) and Arthur Merric Boyd in 1886. Both were already established as painters at the time of their marriage. Their second-born son Merric Boyd married Doris Gough and had five artistic children, Lucy de Guzman Boyd, Arthur Boyd, Guy Boyd, David Boyd, and Mary Elizabeth Boyd.

== Early life and career ==
Born in Victoria, Lucy Boyd is the daughter of Australian artists William Merric Boyd and Doris Boyd. Lucy married Henry Hatton Beck (1901–1994) in 1939, setting up the Altamira Pottery together in Murrumbeena. In 1944 they sold the pottery to Lucy's brother Arthur Boyd, John Perceval and Peter Herbst, and it was renamed Arthur Merric Boyd Pottery (AMB). Following Boyd Beck's parents deaths, Merric Boyd in 1959 and Doris Boyd in 1960, they returned to Melbourne and lived at Open Country, the Boyd family property in Murrumbeena. In 1963, they moved to Boronia for a short time before traveling to London, where in 1966 Lucy, Hatton, and their son, Robert Hatton-Boyd established a pottery at Wandsworth Common operating it for four years. Here the family made lamp bases, mugs, decorated plates and bowls, and other utilitarian eathernwares.

== Exhibitions ==
- Hatton and Lucy Beck ceramics, September 1965, Riek Le Grand's Studio, Canberra.
- Hatton and Lucy Beck ceramics, 29 September-3 October 1965, Studio Nundah, Canberra.
- Hatton and Lucy Beck 4–12 March 1970, Australian Sculpture Gallery, Narrabundah.
- Hatton and Lucy Beck, 30 March-4 April 1976, Macqurie Galleries, Sydney.

== Publications ==
- Smith, Colin G. Lucy Boyd Beck : life and art. Colin G. Smith, [Murrumbeena, Vic], 2020.

== Collections ==
- National Gallery of Australia, Canberra.
- National Gallery of Victoria, Melbourne.
- Victoria and Albert Museum, London.
- Newcastle Art Gallery, New South Wales.
- University of Newcastle, New South Wales.
- Shepparton Art Gallery, Victoria.
