= Charles Henry Chomley =

Australian writer and newspaper editor (1868–1942)

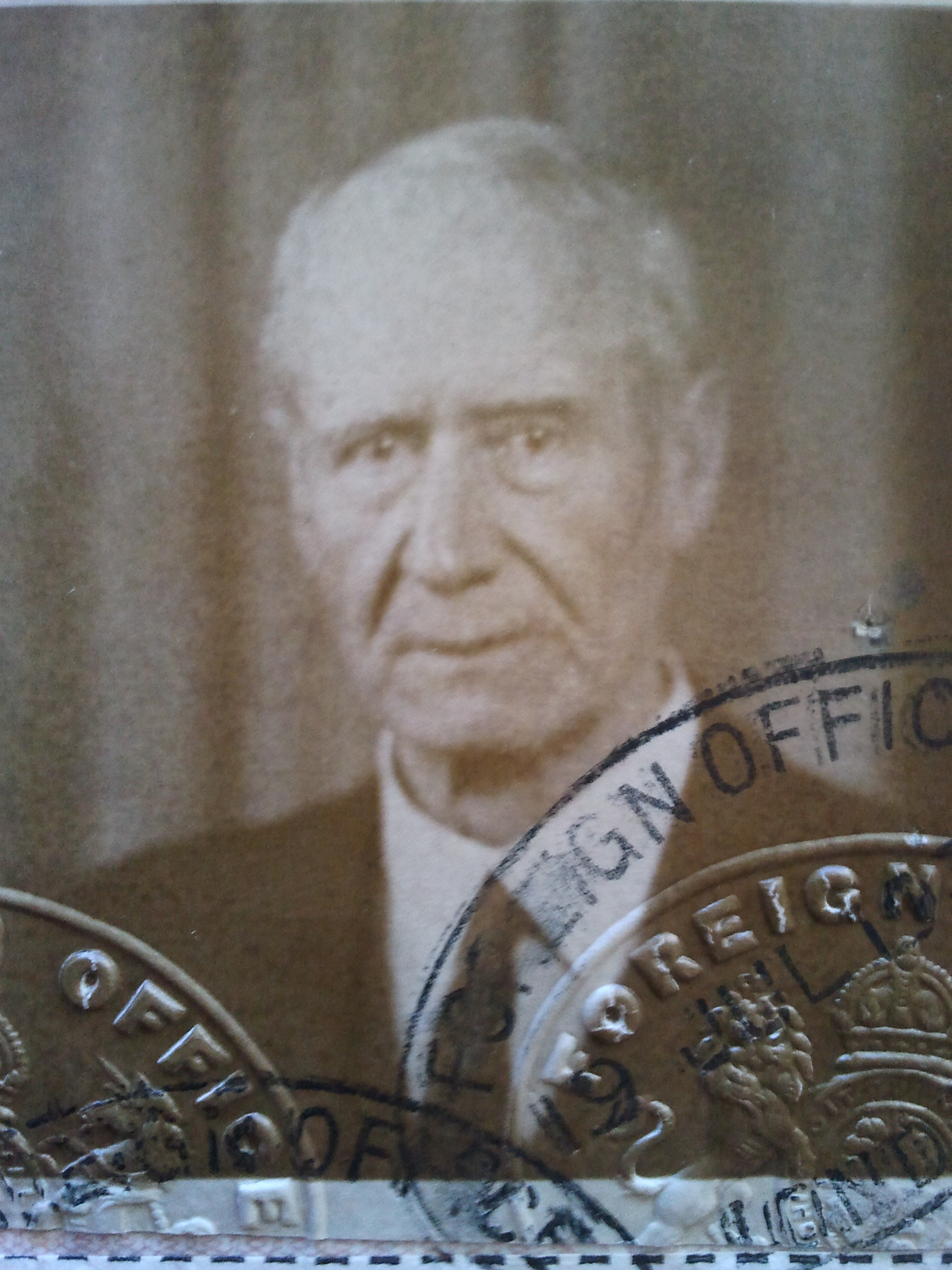
- Passport photo of Charles Henry Chomley dated 1938
- Born: Charles Henry Chomley; 28 April 1868; Sale, Victoria, Australia
- Died: 21 October 1942 (aged 74); London, England
- Education: Bachelor of Arts, 1888. Bachelor of Law, 1889.
- Alma mater: Trinity College (University of Melbourne)
- Occupations: Writer; journalist; barrister
- Writing career
- Language: English

Charles Henry Chomley (28 April 1868 – 21 October 1942) was an Australian farmer, barrister, writer, and journalist. His non-fiction and fiction works alike reflected his strong interest and involvement in politics and law.

He was born in Sale, Victoria, to banker Henry Baker Chomley and his wife Eliza (daughter of lawyer and politician Thomas Turner à Beckett). He was nephew to prominent Victorians Arthur Wolfe Chomley (barrister) and Hussey Malone Chomley (Police Commissioner) and uncle to Martin Boyd, noted Australian novelist.

== Parents ==
Henry Baker Chomley emigrated from Ireland to Australia with his mother, Mary Elizabeth Chomley, sister of Sir Richard Griffith, and his six brothers, following the death of their clergyman father, Rev Francis Chomley (1784–1847). In search of better opportunities and following the advice of her younger brother, Charles James Griffith and her older sister, Anne Greene who had arrived earlier, the Chomleys arrived on HMS Stag to Port Phillip, Victoria, in February 1849 and settled in Prahran. Eliza à Beckett sailed with her father and family from London, arriving on HMS Andromache to Port Adelaide in December 1850. The pair married in Melbourne in 1863.

== 1888 to 1900 ==
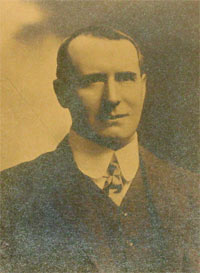
C H Chomley, 1889

Charles, the second of four children, graduated with a BA in 1888 and an LL.B in 1889 from Trinity College (University of Melbourne). He was admitted to the Victorian Bar in 1891, and in the same year wed his cousin, Ethel Beatrice Ysobel à Beckett, the youngest of six children (sister of Emma Minnie à Beckett Boyd, wife of Arthur Merric Boyd). After spending the following year with his wife and her family in England, Chomley left the legal profession in 1893 to establish a farming partnership in Australia with his cousin, Frank Chomley. With a group of friends, he settled in the King River Valley in northeast Victoria. Chomley was an Oxley Shire councillor from 1896 to 1899 (president in 1898), but heart problems forced him to retire to Melbourne around 1900.

== Life as an editor ==
The return to Melbourne signalled the launch of Chomley's journalistic career, and in the same year as retiring to the city, he took up his first editorship position at the illustrated weekly Arena. Dedicated to the arts, politics, and society gossip, the magazine also demonstrated strong support of both the suffragette movement and free trade. Such political persuasions would become increasingly evident in Chomley's later literary works. These works included novels, a biography, short stories, a children's book, and song lyrics, as well as various articles for the publications he contributed to or edited.

Over the following few years, Chomley wrote and co-wrote several works, before setting sail for London in 1907. In 1908, he became editor of the British Australasian, a weekly tabloid that provided Antipodeans in London a link to news, markets, weather, and society information from home. Under Chomley's editorship, the magazine developed a distinctly more artistic tone, with some summer numbers featuring sketches, poetry, short stories and interviews with prominent members of the Australasian arts community in London. Themes he favoured in the Arena, such as the arts, politics and gossip, would become permanently infused in the magazine. Matters of religion were largely absent from its pages; after trialling several churches in Melbourne, Chomley had settled on Agnosticism. Chomley's daughters Isla and Francie regularly assisted in the writing of social columns and reviews, with nephews Penleigh Boyd and Martin Boyd also making contributions.

During this time, Chomley's London home in Ladbroke Gardens became a social hub for his fellow Antipodeans; as Brenda Niall writes in her biography of the Boyd family, Chomley's restless temper and radical ideas fostered an environment in which topics of any manner could be discussed. During this period of his editorship, a relationship was purportedly cultivated with fellow British Australasian contributor and his wife's closest friend, Frances Fitzgerald Elmes (known as Frances Fawkner); it has even been suggested that Chomley fathered two of Elmes’ children.

By 1914, the British Australasian was firmly established as a fixture of the Australasian community in London. Chomley would remain editor until his death in London in October 1942. Predeceased by his wife in 1940, Chomley left daughters Isla, Francie, and Betty and son Arthur Charles.

== Political interests ==
One of Chomley's key interests as reflected in his professional and artistic endeavours was politics. The Australian political climate saw several dramatic changes around the turn of the 20th century, such as the women's suffrage movement, alongside many party amalgamations. Australia gained its first Prime Minister, Edmund Barton, in 1901 following the federation of the colonies. The 1906 federal election also created waves in Australian politics. This period and the previous years saw contentions by Protectionist, Labor and Free Trade (renamed as Anti-Socialists) Candidates. During this period, Charles Henry Chomley was secretary of the Victorian Citizens League, and had a consistent dialogue with leader of the Protectionist Party; Alfred Deakin. Chomley's involvement in politics is evident in the literary works he produced. He was also a member of the Council of the Australian Free Trade and Liberal Association, 1904.

Chomley published his novel Mark Meredith: A Tale of Socialism in 1905. The novel is important in Australian literary history as it provides an insight into the political state of Australia at this time and is a reflection of the emotions of the Australian people Mark Meredith: A Tale of Socialism depicts a fictitious period in Australian history where socialism has been in place for numerous years. Chomley depicts a very negative view of socialism throughout this novel with the novel's hero Mark Meredith rising against the socialist powers. Another politically inspired work by Chomley is Protection in Canada and Australasia published in 1904. It discusses the two federations of the British Empire in relation to free trade and protectionist battles. Tariff history, national policy and industrial welfare are all detailed by Chomley in this political non-fiction book.

A letter in the May 1938 London Jewish Chronicle in which the author, Charles Chomley expressed the view the desirability of large-scale Jewish immigration into the vast area of the Kimberley in north-west Australia.

== Legal interests ==
Chomley's knowledge and interest in the law was also prominently reflected in his writing, influenced by his family's deep involvement in the colonial legal system.

The True Story of the Kelly Gang of Bushrangers, published in 1900, was a highly researched biography of the notorious 19th-century Victorian family of bushrangers. Chomley wrote the biography using court documents, police records and court evidence. It is recognised as being one of the most accurate depictions of the story of Ned Kelly, particularly regarding the police involvement. In his discussion of The True Story of the Kelly Gang of Bushrangers, Paul Eggert writes: "He often expresses scepticism about the extant accounts of events and of motives, but his attitude is always one of confident understanding and conservative judgement". As the nephew of Arthur Wolfe Chomley, the Assistant prosecutor at Ned Kelly's trial in 1880, and the nephew of Hussey Malone Chomley, a police officer during the Kelly years, Chomley had a unique insight into the case. Hussey Malone Chomley went on to become the Chief Commissioner of Police in Victoria (after F. C. Standish's resignation).

Chomley also published The Wisdom of Esau in 1901, another of his works that demonstrates an interest in the law. The novel was co-written with fellow farmer Robert Leonard Outhwaite. It is a fictional novel that examines land laws within Australia.

== Critical reception ==
Chomley gained a largely positive critical reception for many of his works. His first novel The Wisdom of Esau was labelled both "a very readable romance of Australian life", and a collaboration that seemed to be "entirely successful". Likewise, his 1905 novel Mark Meredith: A Tale of Socialism gained considerable national attention, and was primarily well received by various critics. A less favourable review called Mark Meredith an "odd and grossly inferior parallel to Jack London’s contemporary The Iron Heel".

== Chomley-à Beckett-Boyd Family ==
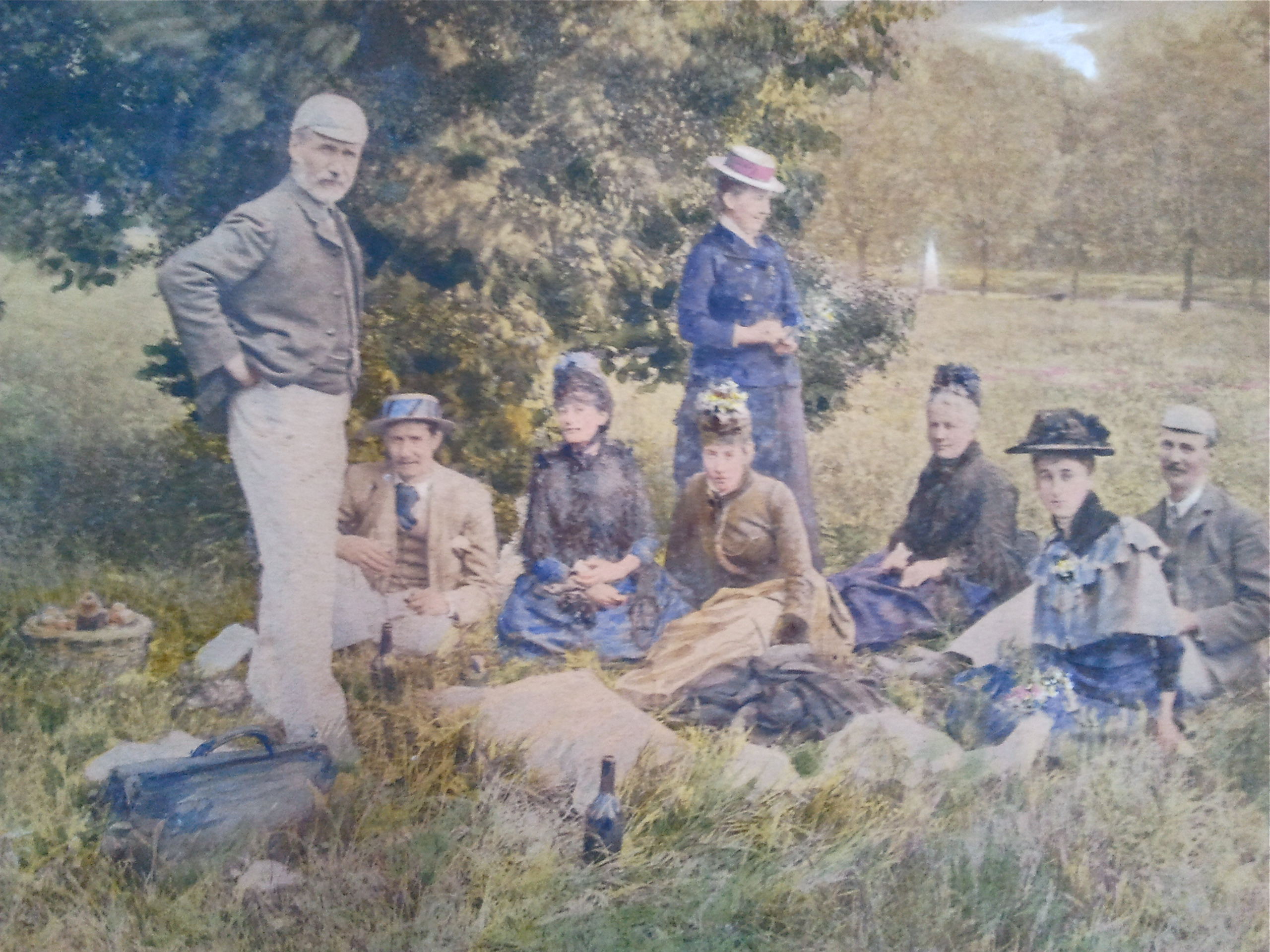
Chomley-a Beckett-Boyd Family picnic, 1922 (C.H. Chomley second from left)

Charles Henry Chomley is a member of the Chomley, à Beckett, and Boyd family who have been synonymous with the establishment, the judiciary, publishing and literature, and the arts since the 1800s in Australia. Several of its members have prolifically contributed to Australian history in artistic as well as in political and legal roles.

4. Francis Chomley
2. Henry Baker Chomley
5. Mary Elizabeth Griffith
1. Charles Henry Chomley
6. Thomas Turner à Beckett
3. Eliza à Beckett
7. Eliza née Stuckey

The Chomley family name features most prominently in the legal sphere, particularly through accomplished family members Arthur Wolfe Chomley and Hussey Malone Chomley, in addition to several other Chomleys who studied and practiced law.

The à Beckett family were also well known for their involvement in the legal field. Sir William à Beckett (1806–1869) worked as a solicitor, barrister, judge, and eventually Chief Justice. William Arthur à Beckett (1833–1901) was a barrister, magistrate and a member of the Upper House. Thomas Turner à Beckett (1808–1892) was a solicitor and a member of Upper House. Arthur Martin à Beckett (1812–1871) worked as a doctor, member of the Lower House and was one of the first members of the Legislative Council of New South Wales. Sir Thomas à Beckett (1836–1919) was a barrister, judge and journalist. Sir Thomas' son, Thomas Archibald à Beckett (1868–1930), studied law with Chomley; the pair also competed together in the University of Melbourne's rowing team. Thomas would open a legal firm with Chomley's brother, Henry Rawdon Francis Chomley (1870–1954). The à Beckett, Chomley, and Henderson Solicitors was situated on Little Collins Street.

The Boyd family are most famously associated with their art within Australia. Arthur Merric Boyd (1862–1940) was an artist and the father of potter William Merric Boyd (1888–1959) and Theodore Penleigh Boyd (1890–1923), also an artist. William Merric Boyd had five children; Lucy, Arthur, Guy, David and Mary, all artists. Martin à Beckett Boyd was a novelist, poet, autobiographer and memoirist. His novel The Montfords (1928) won the Australian Literature Society's first gold medal (ALS Gold Medal) in 1929.

The family member with whom Chomley would share the strongest correlation, however, was Sir William à Beckett. In addition to his various legal roles, Sir William (Chomley's great-uncle) was a writer, journalist and poet. Chomley followed a similar professional path, first pursuing a career in law before channeling his artistic interests into a career in writing. While Sir William chiefly focused on short prose and poetry, also writing articles for the Port Phillip Herald, Chomley would primarily pursue journalism and novel writing.

== Selected bibliography ==
Early editions of many of the following works by Chomley are held in the collections of the Mitchell Library and the Fryer Library within the University of Queensland Library.

Novels

- The Wisdom of Esau (1901) (with Outhwaite, R. L. (Robert Leonard), 1869–1930) New York: Cassell & Co
- The Long Lost Galleon (1905)
- Mark Meredith: A Tale of Socialism (1905) Melbourne: Edgerton & Moore

Biography

- The True Story of the Kelly Gang of Bushrangers (1900), Melbourne: Fraser & Jenkinson, 1920 (Earlier ed. 1907)

Short story collections

- Tales of Old Times: Early Australian Incident and Adventure (1903) Melbourne: Pater
- The Jackeroo: A Comedy in One Act (1921)

Children's

- The Flight of the Black Swan: A Tale of Piracy and Adventure (1903) London: George Rutledge & Sons

Law and society

- Protection in Canada and Australasia (1904) London: P.S. King & Son
- Australian pros and cons: a guide to the principal questions of the day, giving the best arguments on both sides, (1905) Melbourne: Fraser & Jenkinson
- Law for laymen: an Australian book of legal advice and information, clear, concise and practical (1907) Melbourne: Fraser & Jenkinson
- The essential reform: land value taxation in theory & practice (with R.L. Outhwaite), (1909) London: Sidgwick & Jackson
