= William à Beckett =

British barrister and colonial judge

Sir William à Beckett
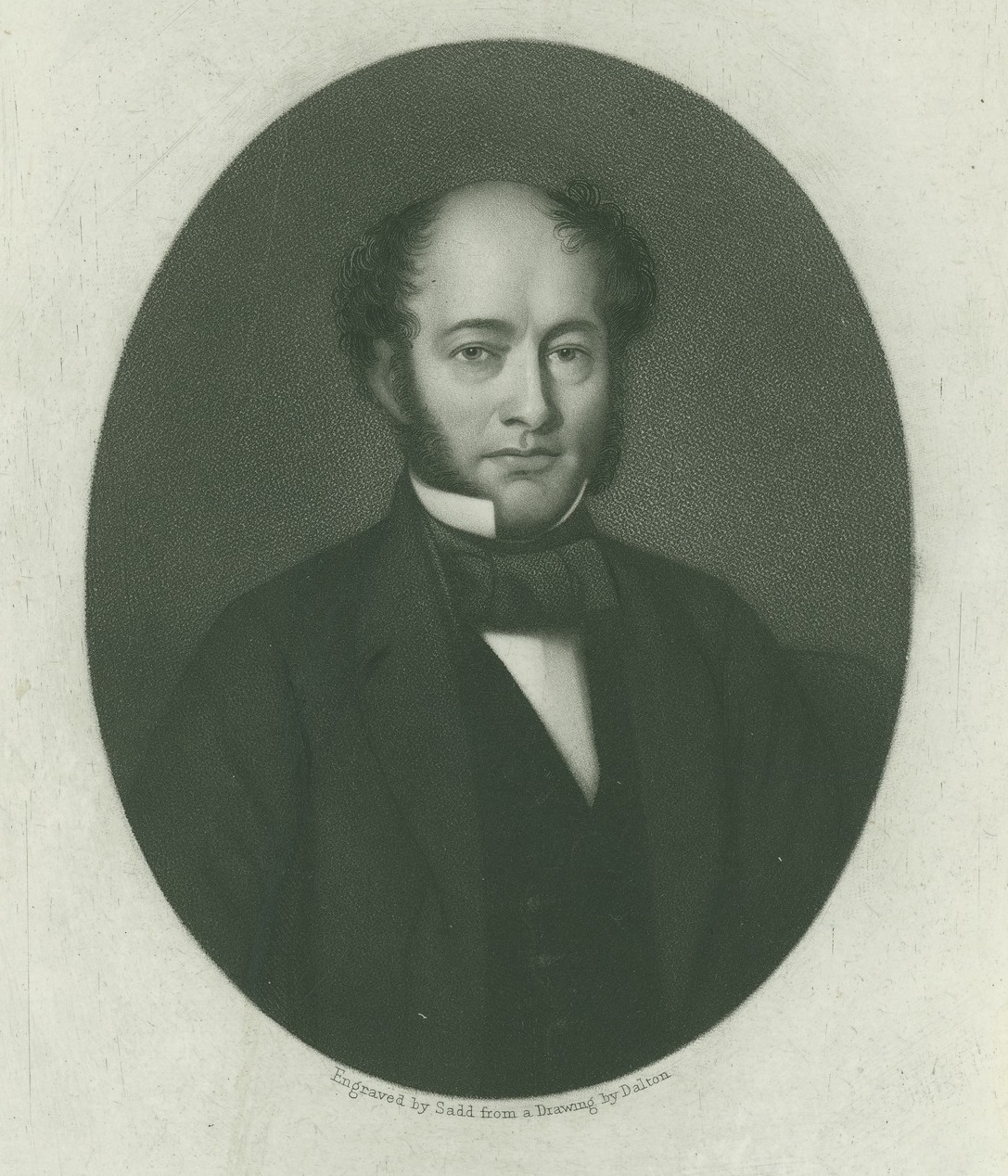

1st Chief Justice of the Supreme Court of Victoria
- In office 19 January 1852 – 20 February 1857
- Preceded by: new office
- Succeeded by: William Foster Stawell

Supreme Court Judge at Port Phillip
- In office 28 February 1846 – 19 January 1852
- Preceded by: Roger Therry
- Succeeded by: Establishment of the Supreme Court of Victoria

3rd Solicitor-General of New South Wales
- In office March 1841 – July 1844
- Preceded by: John Plunkett
- Succeeded by: William Manning

Personal details
- Born: 28 July 1806 London, England, United Kingdom of Great Britain and Ireland
- Died: 27 June 1869 (aged 62) London, England, United Kingdom of Great Britain and Ireland
- Resting place: West Norwood Cemetery
- Spouses: Emily Hayley (m. 1832; d. 1841); Matilda Hayley (m. 1849)
- Relations: Gilbert Abbott à Beckett (brother); Thomas Turner à Beckett (brother); Emma Minnie Boyd (granddaughter); Thomas à Beckett (nephew)
- Children: 13
- Education: Westminster School
- Occupation: Barrister; Politician

Sir William à Beckett (28 July 1806 – 27 June 1869) was a British barrister and the first Chief Justice of the Supreme Court of Victoria.

== Background ==
Born in London, he was the eldest son of William à Beckett, also a solicitor. His younger brothers were Gilbert Abbott à Beckett, one of the original staff of Punch and the author of 'Comic History of England', and Thomas Turner à Beckett (13 September 1808 – 1 July 1892). He was educated at Westminster School, publishing a youthful volume of verse, The Siege of Dumbarton Castle, in 1824. In 1829 he was called to the bar by Lincoln's Inn.

== Legal career ==
In 1837, à Beckett migrated to New South Wales and edited the 'Literary News', a short-lived newspaper. In 1838 à Beckett, along with William Foster and Richard Windeyer, defended the 11 colonists charged with murder in relation to the Myall Creek massacre. He was appointed acting Solicitor General for the colony in March 1841, and Solicitor General in March 1843. In July 1844 he became an acting judge, and was made a full puisne judge of the Supreme Court of NSW.

In January 1846, he was appointed to the Supreme Court of New South Wales for the District of Port Phillip as the resident judge. In 1851 he was created a knight bachelor. When in January 1852 the separate colony of Victoria was proclaimed he became its first Chief Justice.

He returned to Melbourne in December 1854 in time to participate in the Eureka Stockade trials. Although often accused of the inflammatory comments at the trial of the arsonists of the Eureka Hotel, it was the actually the Acting Chief Justice Redmond Barry who sparked the Eureka uprising. À Beckett retired as Chief Justice in 1857 due to poor health, and in 1863 he returned to England.

== Author ==
Politically conservative, à Beckett was strongly opposed to the social disruption caused by the Victorian Gold Rush and under the pseudonym 'Colonus' espoused his views in an influential pamphlet somewhat cumbersomely entitled Does the Discovery of Gold in Victoria Viewed in Relation to its Moral and Social Effects as Hitherto Developed Deserve to be Considered a National Blessing or a National Curse? late in 1852. He presided over a number of important trials including the robbers of gold from the barque Nelson in Hobson's Bay in 1852, but growing disillusion with the state of society in Victoria saw him leave for England with his family in February 1853.

He wrote a number of books, including several volumes of his poetry, and a manual for magistrates of the Court of Petty Sessions, the predecessor of the Magistrates Court of Victoria.

== Family ==
À Beckett married firstly Emily Hayley in 1832. She died on 1 June 1841 and he married secondly Matilda Hayley, her sister, in 1849. He had 13 children with his two wives. À Beckett died in London on 27 June 1869 and was buried in West Norwood Cemetery. He was survived by four sons. One, William, (1833–1901) married Emma Mills (1838–1906), the daughter of John Mills, a freed convict from Tasmania who founded brewing in Melbourne. Their daughter Emma Minnie Boyd, whose pursuit was painting, married another of the same pursuit, Arthur Merric Boyd, and there began extended generations of artists in Australian cultural life, collectively the Boyd family. Sir William's nephew Thomas à Beckett, son of his brother Thomas, was also a puisne judge in Australia.

== Legacy ==
A'Beckett Street, located in Melbourne's Central Business District, is named for Sir William and his influential role as Chief Justice of Victoria.

== Bibliography ==
- Out of Harness (1854) — travel, prose
- The Earl's Choice and Other Poems (1863) — poetry
- The First Gold Rush at Melbourne and Other Poems (1999) — poetry

== See also ==
- Judiciary of Australia
- List of Judges of the Supreme Court of Victoria

Legal offices
New office	Chief Justice of the Supreme Court of Victoria; 1852–1857	Succeeded by William Foster Stawell
Preceded by Roger Therry	Judge of the Supreme Court of NSW; District of Port Phillip; 1846–1852	Establishment of the Supreme Court of Victoria
Preceded by John Plunkett	Solicitor General for New South Wales; 1841–1844	Succeeded by William Manning
