= Guy Boyd =

Guy Boyd may refer to:

- Guy Boyd (sculptor) (1923–1988), Australian sculptor
- Guy Boyd (actor) (born 1943), American character actor
