= David Boyd (artist) =

Australian artist (1924–2011)

David Boyd OAM
- Born: David Fielding Gough Boyd; 23 August 1924; Murrumbeena, Victoria, Australia
- Died: 10 November 2011 (aged 87); Sydney, New South Wales, Australia
- Education: National Gallery School
- Known for: Painting, sculpture
- Movement: Antipodeans
- Spouse: Hermia Boyd (nee Lloyd-Jones) (1948)
- Children: Amanda Boyd, Lucinda Boyd, Cassandra Boyd
- Parents: Merric Boyd (father); Doris Boyd (née Gough) (mother)
- Relatives: Arthur Merric Boyd, Emma Minnie Boyd (grandparents); Lucy de Guzman Boyd, Arthur Boyd, Guy Boyd, Mary Elizabeth Boyd (siblings); Irian Boyd, Jesamine Boyd, Cressida O'Hanlon, Tom Boyd, Will Boyd (grandchildren)

David Fielding Gough Boyd OAM (23 August 1924 – 10 November 2011) was an Australian artist, and a member of the Boyd artistic dynasty.

== Boyd family ==
The Boyd artistic dynasty began with the marriage of Emma Minnie à Beckett (known as Minnie) and Arthur Merric Boyd in 1886. Both were already established as painters at the time of their marriage. Their second-born son Merric Boyd married Doris Gough and had five artistic children, Lucy de Guzman Boyd, Arthur Boyd, Guy Boyd, David Boyd, and Mary Elizabeth Boyd.

David Fielding Gough Boyd was born on 23 August 1924 in Murrumbeena, Victoria.

In 1948 David Boyd married Hermia Lloyd-Jones, the daughter of graphic artist Herman and Erica Lloyd-Jones. Following the tradition of their family, their three daughters Amanda, Lucinda, and Cassandra are artists.

== Education and career ==
Boyd entered the Melba Memorial Conservatorium of Music in Melbourne at seventeen, but was conscripted to the army after one year. Upon his return, he studied art at the National Gallery School on an ex-serviceman's grant.

In 1946, he worked with his brother Guy at the Martin Boyd Pottery in Sydney. In 1949 David established a pottery studio with Hermia called David and Hermia Boyd Pottery first in Paddington and later in London in the early 1950s and continued working mainly in pottery through to the mid-1960s. In 1956, David and Hermia became widely known as leading Australian potters. They introduced new glazing techniques and potter's wheel use in shaping sculptural figures.

Boyd's painting career began in 1957 with a series of symbolic paintings on Australian explorers that aroused much controversy at the time, focusing as they did on the tragic history of the Aboriginal Tasmanians. In 1958 he exhibited a series of paintings based on the histological episodes in the explorations of Burke and wills and Bass and Flinders. He joined the Antipodeans Group in the 1950s. Boyd discovered a technique in 1966 that he named Sfumato, after da Vinci's usage of the word to describe graduations of smoky tones in painting. Boyd's method achieved this effect through a new technique involving candle flame.

Boyd and his family moved to Rome in 1961, and later moved to London. They also spent several years creating art in Spain and the south of France before returning permanently to Australia in 1975.

David Boyd was artist-in-residence at the School of Law, Macquarie University, Sydney from 1993–1996.

In a September 2004 art review, Alex McDonald of State of the Arts magazine stated that David Boyd's work was 'ahead of his time in addressing the mistreatment of Indigenous people in Australia, but commented that an 'explanation for his frosty reception from Australian critics and dealers may have something to do with his choice of subject matter'. McDonald explained that the controversy may have stemmed from the fact that the 'legal system, race relations and religion' are 'not exactly popular issues' and were not 'up for debate in the late 1950s'.

== Appointments and awards ==
- President of the Contemporary Art Society – Victorian branch (1960)
- Elected Councillor of the Museum of Modern Art Australia (1960)
- First Prize Italian Art Scholarship for Australian Chairman of the Federal Council of the Contemporary Art Society (1961)
- Artist-in-residence at the School of Law, Macquarie University, NSW (1993–96)
- 'Membro Albo Doro Del Senato Accademico – International Academy of Modern Art, Rome, Italy (1998)

== Death ==
Boyd died on 10 November 2011.
