= Boyd family =

Australian family

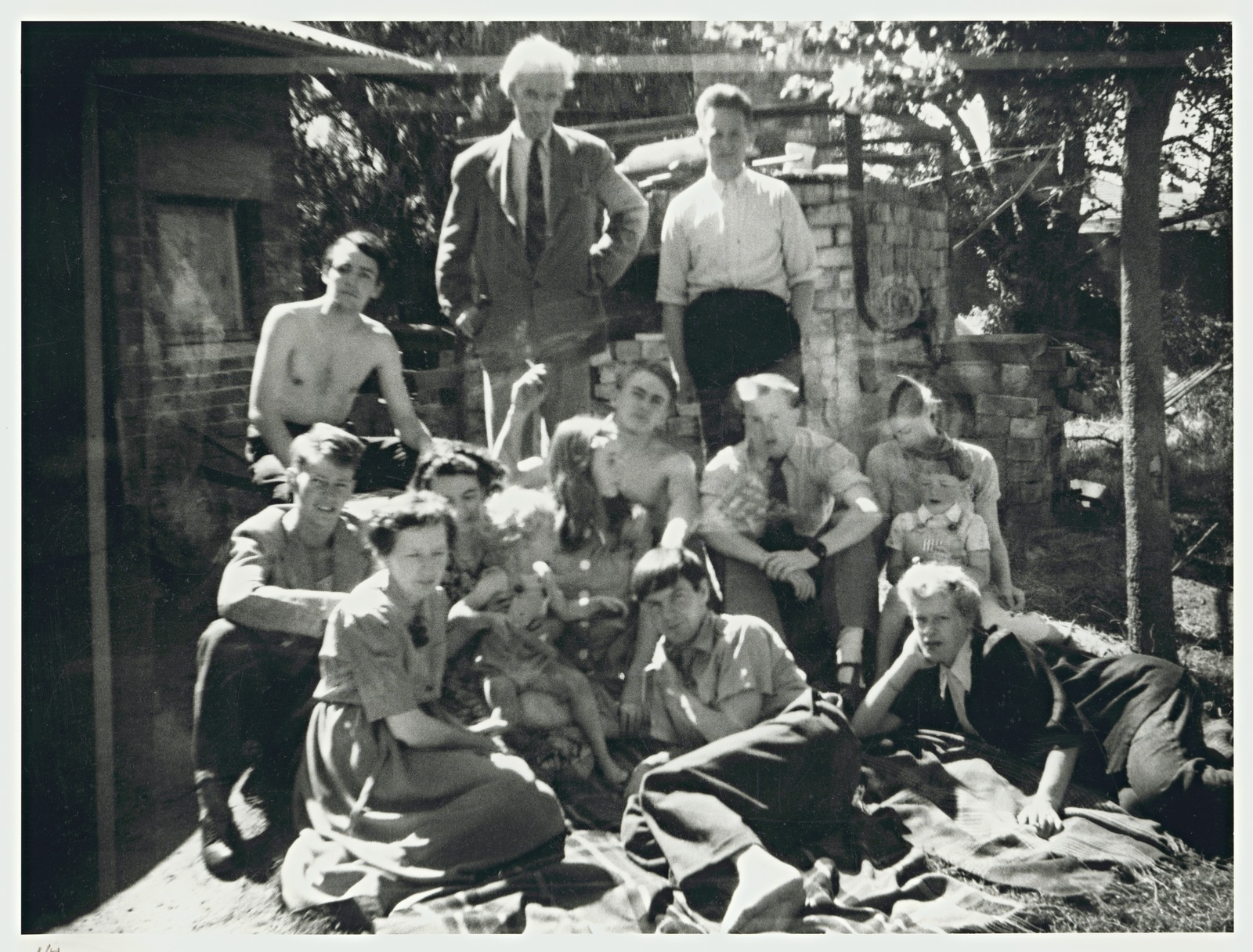
Merric and Doris Boyd at home, Open Country, with their family, complete, in 1943, gathered for a photograph by Albert Tucker whose companion Joy Hester, lazes on one arm to the right.

The Boyd family is an Australian family whose members over several generations contributed to the arts in the fields of painting, sculpture, pottery, ceramics, literature, architecture, poetry and music. The Boyd family is considered an artistic dynasty.

== Family tree ==
The family is descended from four diverse immigrants to Victoria:

- William à Beckett (1806–1869), lawyer and Chief Justice of Victoria, arrived in New South Wales in 1837 with his wife, Emily (née Hayley) à Beckett and three young sons; including the Hon. William Arthur Callendar à Beckett (1833–1901). His brother, Thomas Turner à Beckett, arrived in Australia in 1850 and was the father of Eliza à Beckett who married Charles Henry Chomley, a novelist and newspaper editor.
- John Mills (c. 1810–1841) was transported a convict to Van Diemen's Land in 1827. He was awarded a ticket of leave and married Hannah Hale in 1836. He and his wife arrived in the Port Phillip District in 1837 and there began brewing and real estate development. Mr and Mrs Mills had a daughter, Emma (1838–1906), the ultimate heiress to the Mills financial interests, marrying the Hon. W.A.C. à Beckett September 1855.
- Major Alexander Boyd (1 August 1792 – 21 August 1869), paymaster of the 11th Regiment of Foot (The North Devonshire Regiment of Foot), arrived in Van Diemen's Land in 1845, possibly with his wife, Susan Boyd, née Brown, (May 1796 – ).
- Robert Martin (1798–1874), medical practitioner and squatter, travelled by land from Sydney in 1839 to take up land at Mount Sturgeon near Dunkeld and Heidelberg. His wife Lucy Martin (née Gear) and family came from Sydney to join him soon after.

These four families were joined by marriages of their children in the young colony of Victoria in the 1850s:

- The Hon. William Arthur Callendar à Beckett (1833–1901) married Emma Mills (1838–1906) in 1855, and together they had six children, including Emma Minnie à Beckett (1858–1936); and Major Alexander Boyd's son Captain John Theodore Thomas Boyd (1825–1891) married Dr Robert Martin's daughter Lucy Charlotte Martin in 1857, and had 12 children, including Arthur Merric Boyd (1862–1940).
  - Arthur Merric Boyd married Emma Minnie à Beckett (known as Minnie). Both were already individually established in society as painters. They had five children, four of whom became prominent in the Australian artistic world. When their children had matured, married or settled elsewhere, Arthur Merric and Emma Minnie Boyd lived in a connecting property to their son, Merric Boyd and family in Wahroongaa Crescent, Murrumbeena but then in 1924 moved to 5 Edward Street, Sandringham. When his wife died in 1936 Arthur Merric moved to a family cottage at Rosebud on the Mornington Peninsula on the shores of Port Phillip Bay and in 1939 returned to Wahroongaa Crescent, Murrumbeena where he lived out his last days.
    - John Gilbert à Beckett Boyd (1886–1896) was killed in a riding accident.
    - William Merric Boyd (1888–1959), potter, married Doris Gough (1889–1960), painter. Doris and Merric Boyd, newly married, found their home there, at Murrumbeena, naming it "Open Country," establishing a continuance of artistic tradition to the name Boyd.
      - Lucy Evelyn Gough Boyd (1916–2009), painter, ceramic decorator, married Hatton Beck (1901–1994), ceramist, potter, sculptor.
        - Laurence Hatton Beck (1940–)
        - Robert Hatton Beck (1942–)
        - Paul Hatton Beck (1948–)
      - Arthur Merric Bloomfield Boyd (1920–1999), painter, married Yvonne Lennie, painter.
        - Polly Boyd (1946–) Melbourne-born landscapist in oil
        - Jamie Patrick Boyd (1948–2025), painter and sculptor
        - Lucy Ellen Boyd (1958-)
      - Guy Martin à Beckett Boyd (1923–1988) potter and sculptor, married Phyllis Emma Nairn.
        - Lenore Ann (1953-), sculptor
        - Sally Deirdre (1956-)
        - Derry Catherine (1957-)
        - Kirstin Doris (1960-), author
        - Ben (1963-)
        - Charlotte Beatrice Magdalen (1968–2021)
        - Martin Duncan Gough (1970-)
      - David Fielding Gough Boyd (1924–2011), potter, painter, married Hermia Boyd nee Lloyd-Jones (1931– ), Sydney-born ceramic decorator, artist, stage designer.
        - Amanda
        - Lucinda
        - Cassandra (1956– ) painter, born in Melbourne. Lived in France from 1971
      - Mary Elizabeth Boyd (1926–2016), early age paint and pottery acquaintance, a chronicling photographer from 1960's. Married firstly, November 1944, John Perceval, painter, potter, and sculptor, and had four children.
        - Matthew
        - Tessa
        - Celia
        - Alice
          Mary married secondly, in 1978, Sir Sidney Nolan, painter, becoming Lady Nolan.
    - Theodore Penleigh Boyd (1890–1923), painter, married Edith Susan Gerard Anderson, painter.
      - Pamela Boyd (b & d 1913)
      - Pat Boyd | John à Beckett Penleigh (Pat) Boyd (1915–1980), painter, wartime pilot, then commercial aviation pilot, married Anne Davy.
      - Robin Gerard Penleigh Boyd (1919–1971), architect and writer, married Patricia Madder, daughter to Læticia, a sister to Doris Boyd.
    - Martin à Beckett Boyd (1893–1972), writer.
    - Helen Read à Beckett Boyd (1903–1999), late painter, married Neven Read, naval officer.
      - Gayner Read (1936–1988), painter. Two sons.
      - Susan Read (1938–), children Pennie Easton, Ken Easton, Greame Easton.
      - Andrew Read (1942–), Arthur Read, Rossie Read.
      - Prudence Read (1947–)

It was in 1955 when David Boyd with his wife Hermia returned from a stay of several successful working years as potters in England and the south of France that the conception of this family line was popularised in a display of public relations in the press, magazines and the media (radio in 1955, television arrived 1956) that dismayed most family members. David was working full-scale promoting the circumstances of his life for the benefit of the pottery exhibitions of his and his wife's work, and magazine editors found the thick patina of past grandeur as presented to them by David irresistible and pages of glory adorned the 1955 magazines and newspaper articles. From here on, in the family's history no members could think of themselves again as quite so elite or socially removed although in the popular sense as an artistic family the notoriety was never greater. The generations that followed (including those born before 1955) grew up in this imposed social and cultural circumstance.

Politician Cressida O'Hanlon is a granddaughter of David and Hermia Boyd.

== See also ==
- Nasturtiums (E. Phillips Fox) . . . Edith Anderson, as model to E. Phillips Fox, later to be Mrs Penleigh Boyd.
