= Frances Fitzgerald Elmes =

British-Australian feminist writer

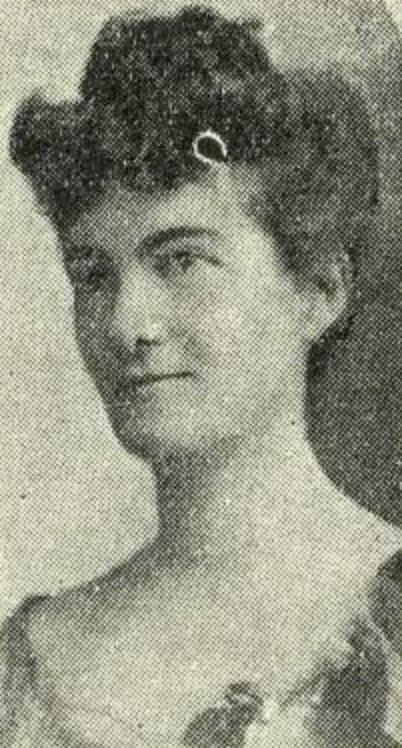
Frances Fitzgerald Elmes

Frances Fitzgerald Elmes (23 April 1867 – 7 February 1919) was a British-Australian feminist writer and columnist based in Melbourne and London. Her columns, short stories, two books and a play appeared under a variety of pen names, including F. F. Elmes, Frances Fitzgerald, F. F., and Frances Fitzgerald Fawkner.

== Biography ==
Frances Fitzgerald Elmes was born in Somerset, England, 23 April 1867. She emigrated to Australia with her family and was raised in Berwick, Victoria, where her father was a medical practitioner. She became a journalist and wrote for The Australasian, The Argus and, after returning to England in 1905, the British Australasian.

In London, Elmes established a relationship with the British Australasian' editor, Charles Henry Chomley (who was married to her close friend Ethel Chomley), during which she is reported to have had two children, a son in 1906 and a daughter in 1908. The relationship was apparently accepted by Chomley's wife and mother.

Elmes died in Hammersmith, London on 7 February 1919 during the Spanish flu epidemic. After her death, her children were brought up by their father and his wife.

== Selected works ==
- Fitzgerald, Frances. The New Woman, a play, performed but not published, 1895.
- Elmes, F. F. The Melbourne Cookery Book: compiled especially with the view of assisting the housewife in the cottage and villa home who must carefully study ways and means. Melbourne: Fraser and Jenkinson, 1906. OCLC 221287128
- Elmes, F. F. "Fashions in Whims: A London Sketch", The Argus, 29 February 1908, 6.
- F. F. "The 'Tail' of a Fish", The Age, 24 April 1915, 18.
- Fitzgerald, Frances. The Children at Kangaroo Creek, London: British Australasian, 1916. OCLC 560859564
- Fitzgerald, Frances. "The Woman Pays", British Australasian, 16 August 1917, 31.
