= Penleigh Boyd =

Australian artist (1890–1923)

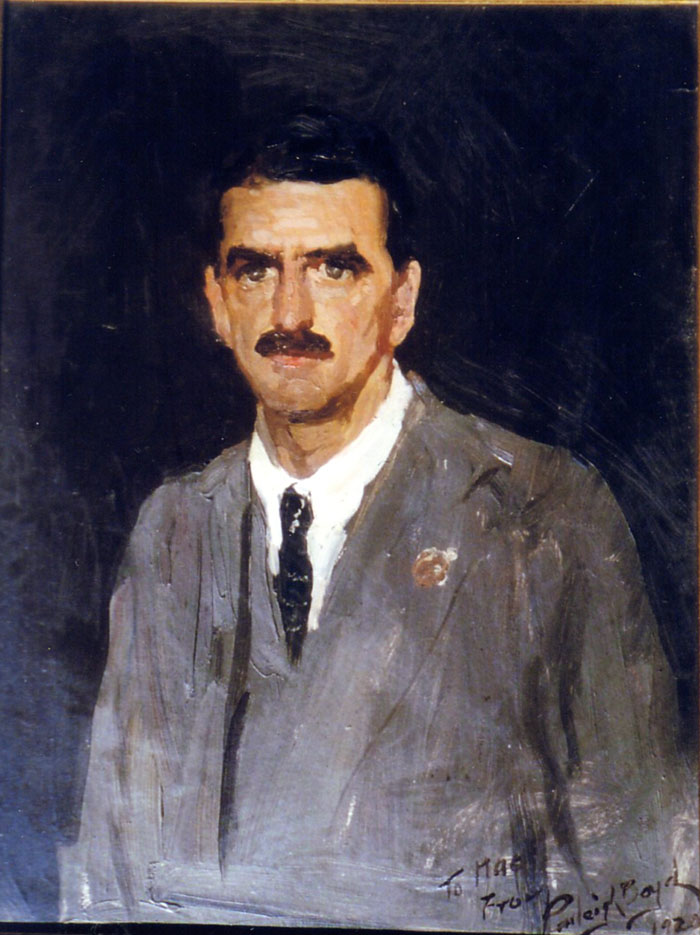
- Self-portrait (1920)
- Born: Theodore Penleigh Boyd; 15 August 1890; Westbury, Wiltshire, England
- Died: 27 November 1923 (aged 33); Warragul, Victoria, Australia
- Education: National Gallery Art School
- Known for: Landscape artist
- Movement: Boyd family
- Spouse: Edith Susan Gerard Anderson
- Children: Pamela Boyd, Pat Boyd, Robin Boyd
- Parents: Arthur Merric Boyd (father); Emma Minnie Boyd (née à Beckett) (mother)
- Relatives: Merric Boyd, Martin Boyd (brothers); Arthur Boyd, Guy Boyd, David Boyd (nephews)
- Awards: Wynne Prize; 1914 Landscape – painter

Theodore Penleigh Boyd (15 August 1890 – 27 November 1923) was an Australian artist.

Penleigh Boyd was a member of the Boyd artistic dynasty: his parents Arthur Merric Boyd (1862–1940) and Emma Minnie Boyd (née à Beckett) were well-known artists of the day, and his brothers included the ceramicist Merric Boyd (1888–1959) and the novelist Martin Boyd (1893–1972). His son Robin Boyd (1919–1971) was an architect, educator and social commentator, and his nephews Arthur Boyd, Guy Boyd and David Boyd were artists.

Penleigh Boyd is best known as a landscapist with an accomplished handling of evanescent effects of light. A notable influence was artist E. Phillips Fox, who introduced him to plein air techniques when they were neighbours in Paris in 1912–3. At his death his obituarists compared him to Arthur Streeton and rated him as one of the most promising painters of his generation.

== Biography ==
Born at Penleigh House, Westbury, Wiltshire in England, Boyd received his artistic training from his parents and at the National Gallery Art School. He had his first exhibition at the Victorian Artists' Society at 18, and exhibited at the Royal Academy in London at 21. He won second prize in the Australian Federal Government's competition for a painting of the site of the new national capital, Canberra. He won the Wynne Prize in 1914 with Landscape.

His Queensland-born wife, Edith Susan Gerard Anderson, was herself a skilled painter and also came from a cultivated family. Her father had been Director of the Queensland Department of Public Instruction, her brother Arthur was a prominent doctor, and her eldest sister Maud was of one of the first women to graduate with a B.A. degree from the University of Sydney (and is possibly Queensland's first female university graduate).

Penleigh Boyd travelled to Europe in 1911. He met Edith, a model in some work of E. Phillips Fox, in Paris in 1912 and they married there on 15 October that year; E. Phillips Fox was a witness, and Rupert Bunny and Bessie Gibson were among the guests at the reception. The couple returned to Australia in 1913 and settled in Melbourne; their first child, Pamela, was born in the spring of 1913, but she died two weeks later.

In 1914, with his painting career flourishing, Penleigh purchased a block of land at Warrandyte and built a family home and studio, "The Robins". The Boyds' second child John á Beckett Boyd (known to all as Pat) was born in 1915. Soon after, Penleigh enlisted in the AIF. Like his brothers Martin and Merric, he served in France during World War I but he was gassed at Ypres in 1917 (which left him with lasting physical problems) and he was invalided back to England and repatriated to Australia in March 1918.

The Boyds' second son Robin was born in January 1919. Penleigh continued to paint prolifically for the rest of his life, although his war service also left permanent psychological scars. In 1922 he took the remarkable step of selling "The Robins" and moving the family to Sydney; soon after was enlisted by Sydney Ure Smith as one of the organisers of a major exhibition of contemporary European art. Penleigh took his family with him to England late in the year to pick paintings but returned to Australia without them in June 1923 to set up the exhibition, which was staged in Sydney and Melbourne in July–August.

Possibly as a result of his involvement in the exhibition, Penleigh grew disillusioned with his recent work, and he destroyed many of his lesser paintings and sold some of his better ones, realising £2500. During his wife's absence he carried on an open affair with Minna Schuler, daughter of the editor of The Age but shortly before Edith and the children returned he bought back "The Robins" as well as purchasing a new Hudson car. He met his family at Port Melbourne when they returned on 24 November, but he and Edith quarrelled almost immediately.

On 28 November, for reasons unknown, he took the Hudson to drive to Sydney. Although he was a skilled driver, he lost control on a sharp bend near Warragul and the car overturned. His passenger survived, but Penleigh suffered terrible injuries and died at the scene within minutes. Fortunately for his wife, the combination of the money from his estate (including the proceeds of the sale of "The Robins", the repaired car and about 40 paintings) plus a small inheritance from her father and an annual allowance from Penleigh's father enabled her to support their sons Pat and Robin without needing to work, even during the depths of the Great Depression.

== Selected paintings ==
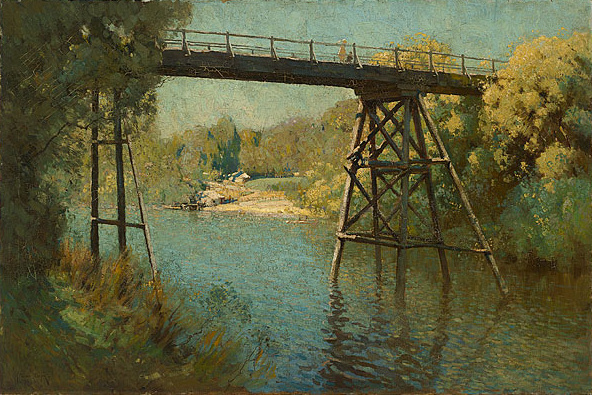
Bridge and Wattle at Warrandyte, 1914

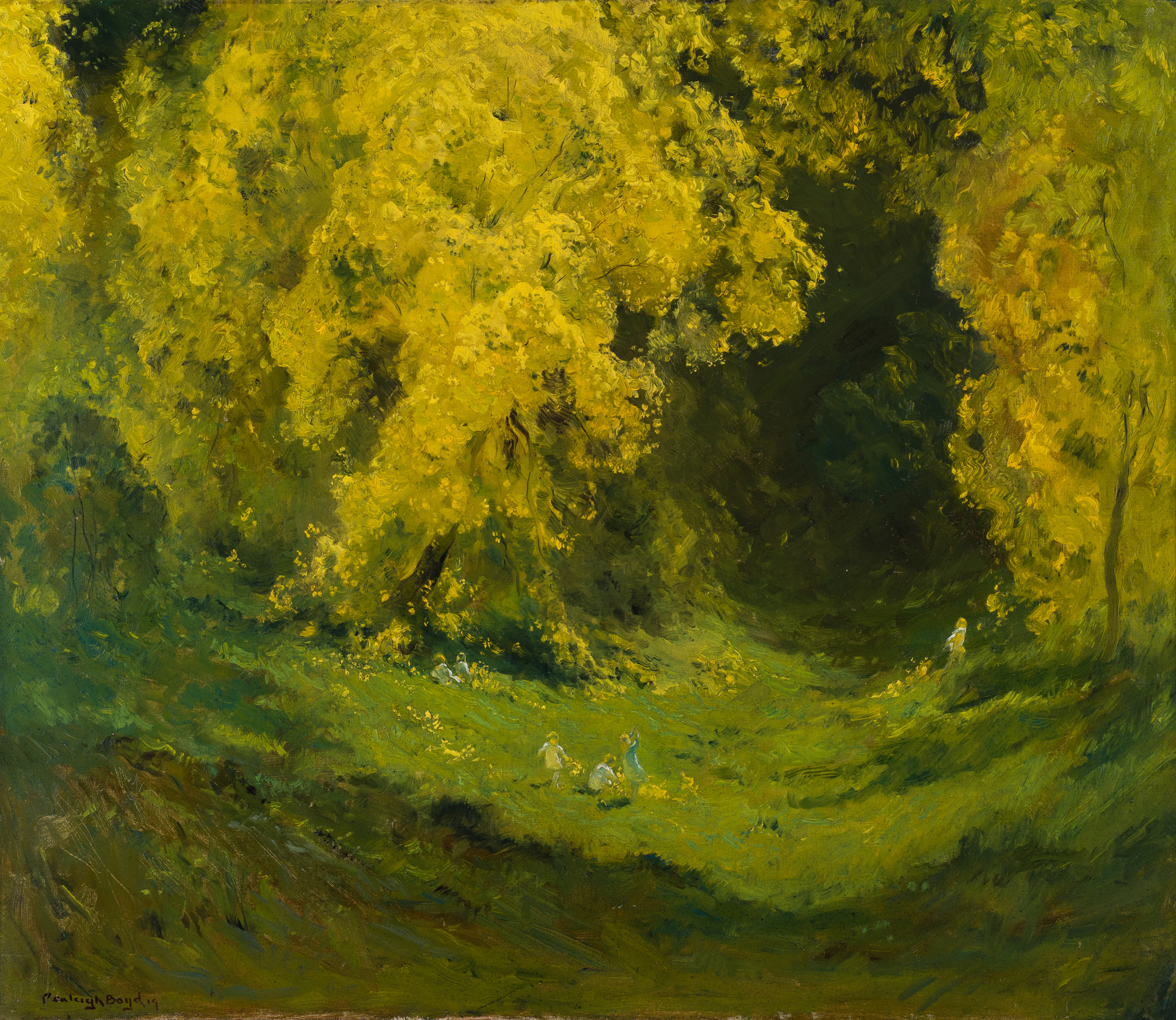
Spring Fantasy, 1919

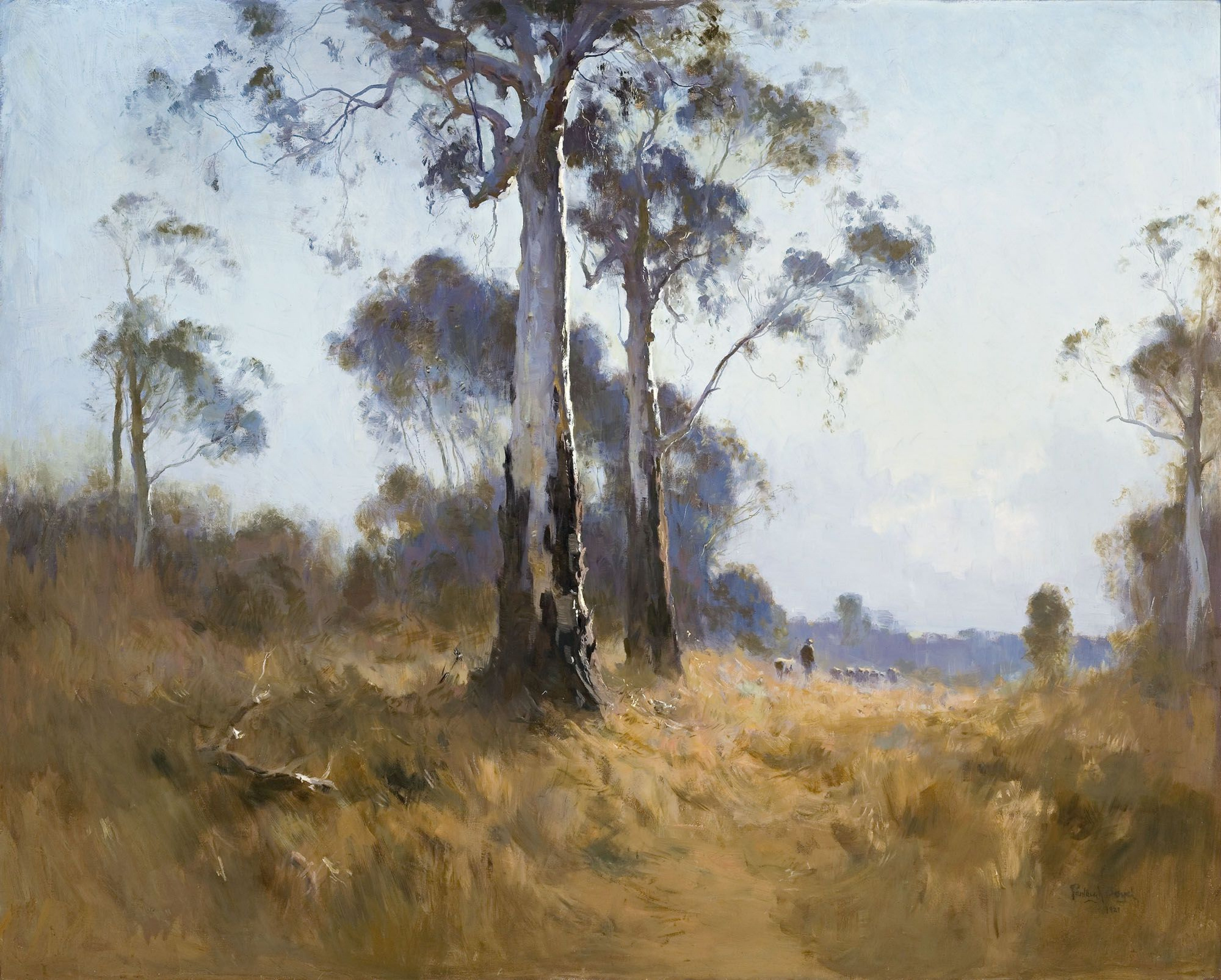
Ghost Gum at Kangaroo Flat, 1921

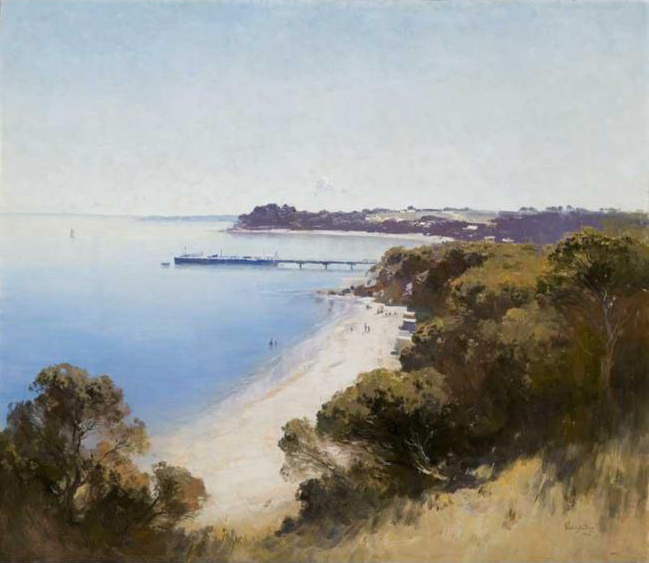
Portsea, 1921

== See also ==
- Australian art
