= Waranara Library =

Academic library

Coordinates: 33°46′26.98″S 151°6′44.74″E

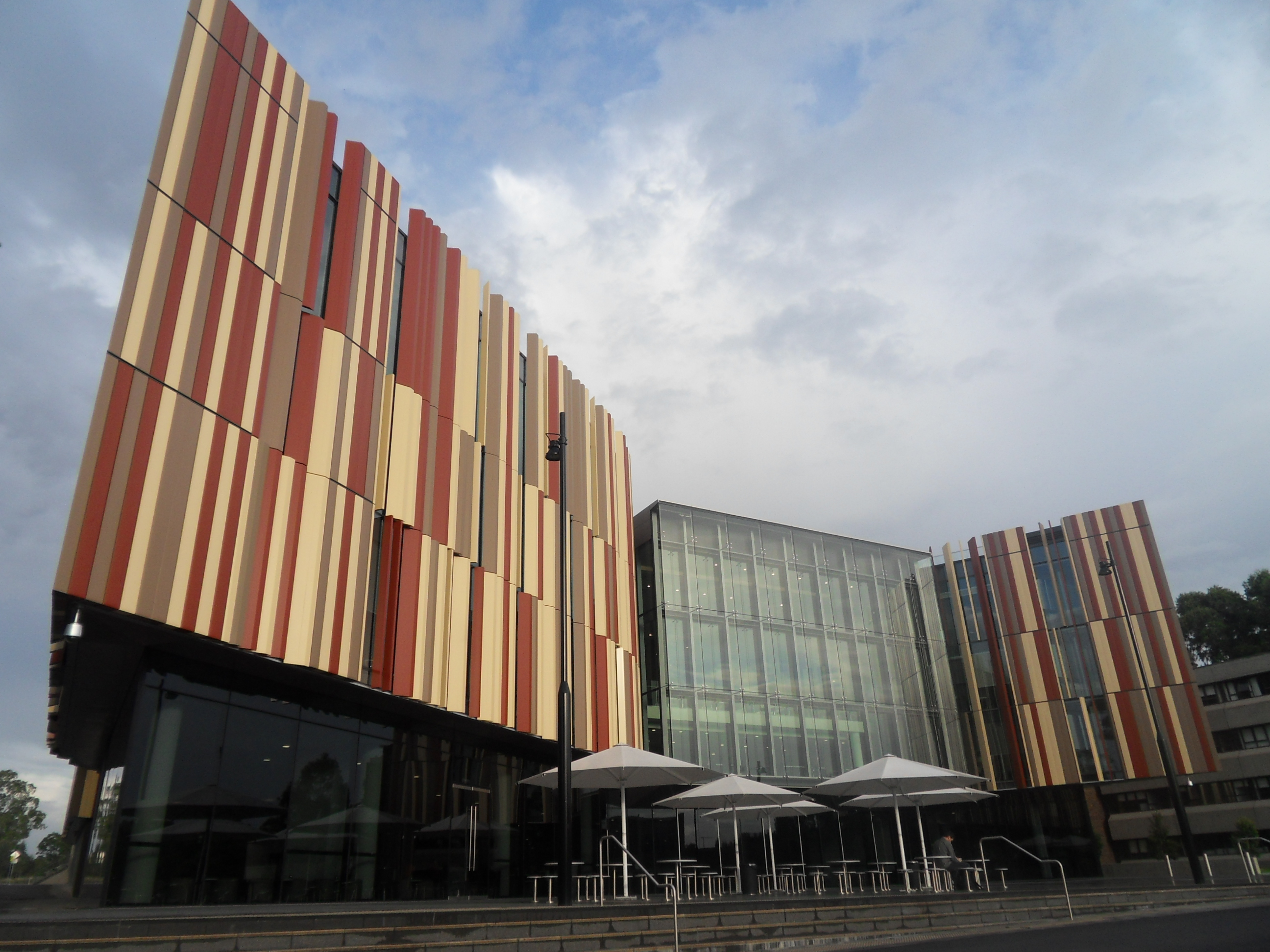
Waranara Library at Macquarie University

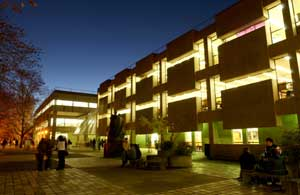
Macquarie University Old Library

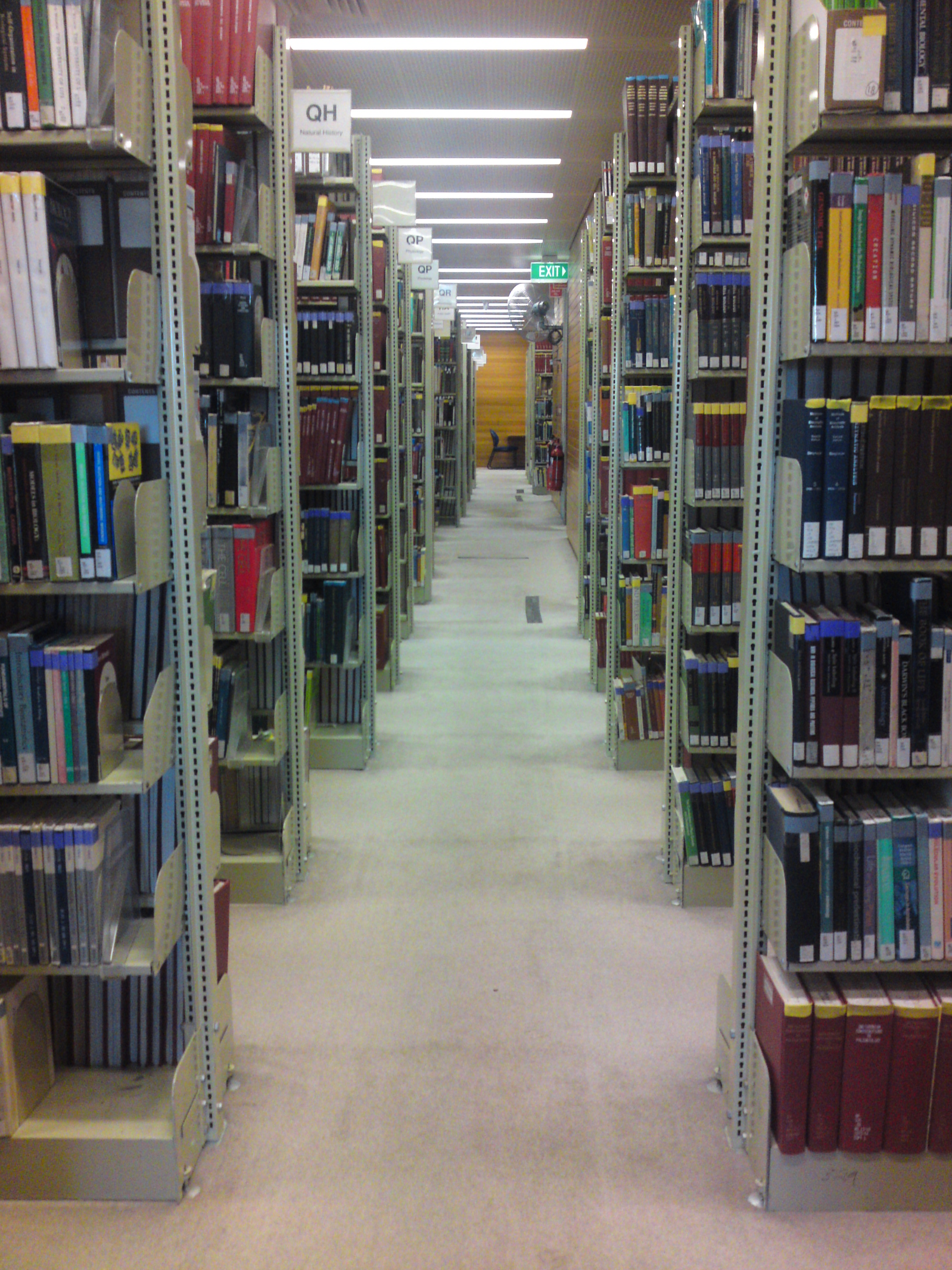
Bookshelves in the old library

Waranara Library (Dharug: "to seek"), also known as Macquarie University Library, is the campus library of Macquarie University and the largest academic library in Northern Sydney. The library holds over 1.8 million print and electronic items, including books, journals, newspapers, reports, conference proceedings, working papers, maps, Macquarie postgraduate theses, computer software, multimedia, microfilm, microfiche and additional non-print resources.

The library provides access to over 600 databases; 500,000 e-books; more than 69,000 electronic journals; books, printed resources and multimedia via MultiSearch.

== The new library ==
The new library building was opened on 25 July 2011, and was assigned building number C3C. It provides a 21st-century learning and research environment that facilitates vital interactions between people and knowledge.

The new library has over 2500 seats for group and individual study and more than 200 PCs for students.

== Automated storage and retrieval system ==
Macquarie University Library was the first university in Australia to install an automated storage and retrieval system (ASRS) in its library. The ASRS consists of an environmentally controlled vault with metal bins able to store up to 1.8 million items. Robotic cranes retrieve an item on request and deliver the item to the service desk for collection. The retrieval process takes just a few minutes.

== Lachlan and Elizabeth Macquarie Room ==
The Lachlan and Elizabeth Macquarie Room is named after Lachlan Macquarie, the fifth British governor of New South Wales. The Lachlan and Elizabeth Macquarie Room is showcased inside the entrance to the library.

The room is of the original ground floor parlour room from Lachlan and Elizabeth Macquarie's home on the Isle of Mull, Scotland. It includes all the original timber panelling, doors, windows, alcoves, shutters, and fireplace dating from the 1820s.

== History ==
Opened in 1967, Macquarie University's original library was a classic example of Brutalist architecture. It was built progressively in four stages and fully completed by 1978.

== See also ==
- List of Brutalist structures
