= William Arthur Callendar à Beckett =

Australian politician

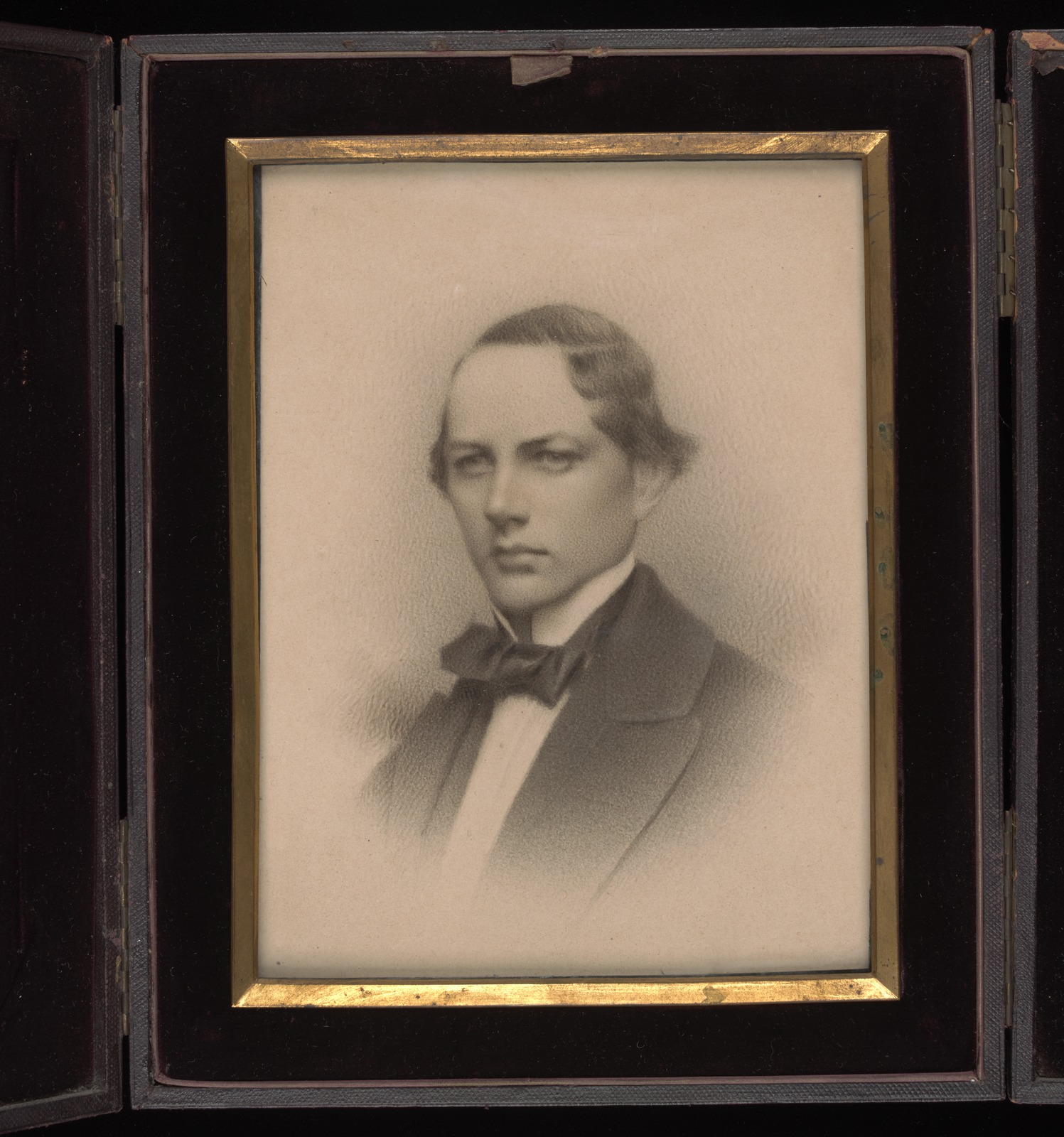
- William Arthur Callendar à Beckett, c.1860
- Born: William Arthur Callendar à Beckett; 7 July 1833; London, Middlesex, England
- Died: 16 December 1901; St Kilda, Melbourne, Victoria, Australia
- Known for: Barrister, Magistrate

William Arthur Callendar à Beckett (1833–1901) eldest son of Sir William à Beckett, was in the Legislative Council of Victoria from 1868 to 1876, and held office without portfolio in the Administration of Sir Charles Gavan Duffy from June 1871 to 10 June 1872. He was sworn in as a member of the Executive Council on 31 July 1871. He represented the first Berry Government in the Legislative Council, being a member of the Ministry without office from 7 August to 20 October 1875. He was admitted to the Victorian bar on 15 September 1875.

William à Beckett was born at Kensington on 7 July 1833, and educated at King's College London, and at Downing College, Cambridge, where he was a Fellow Commoner. He was also called to the English Inner Temple and New South Wales bars. He married, in September 1855, Emma, only child and heiress of John Mills, of Melbourne. Notably he is the father of the Australian painter Emma Minnie Boyd who married another painter Arthur Merric Boyd, to be the first members of many generations of artists, the Boyd family. à Beckett became a magistrate of the colony of Victoria in 1862, but later resided at Penleigh House, Westbury, Wiltshire.
