= Mary Nolan (artist) =

Australian painter, potter and photographer

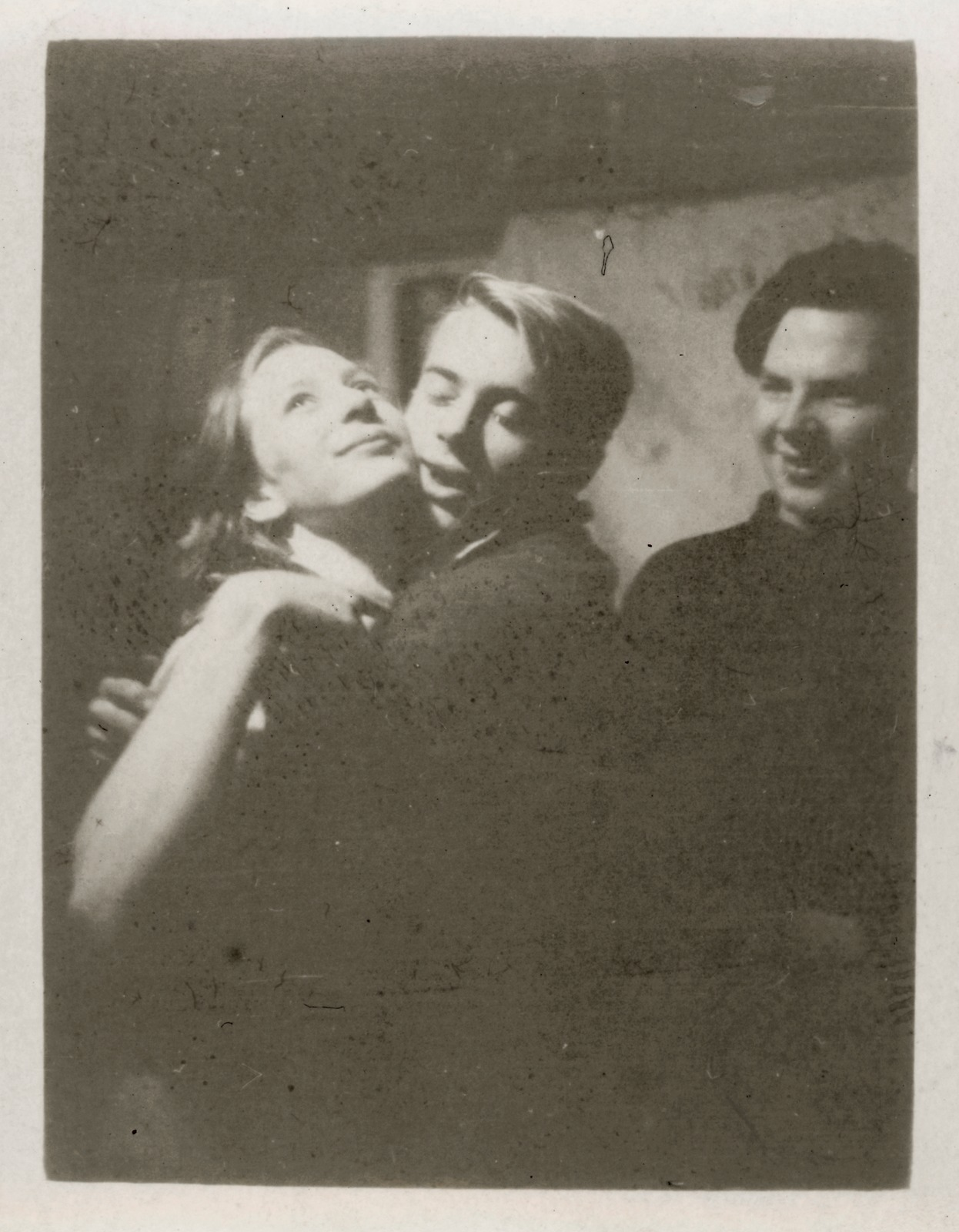
- Mary Nolan, John Perceval, and Arthur Boyd in Arthur's studio
- Born: 8 November 1926; Murrumbeena, Victoria, Australia
- Died: 6 April 2016 (aged 89)
- Known for: Painting, Photography, Pottery
- Spouse(s): John Perceval, Sidney Nolan
- Children: Matthew, Tessa, Celia, Alice

Lady Mary Elizabeth Nolan (née Boyd; 8 November 1926 – 6 April 2016) was an Australian ceramicist, painter and photographer. She is remembered for her marriage to Sidney Nolan and her work preserving his work and estate.

== Biography ==
=== Early life and first marriage ===
Mary Nolan was born in 1926 to father Merric Boyd, a potter, and mother Dorris Boyd (née Gough), a painter. Her maternal grandmother, 'Granny Gough', was a women's rights campaigner. Her paternal grandmother was the painter Emma Minnie Boyd, who exhibited alongside artists such as Arthur Streeton and Tom Roberts. The Boyd family were known for their connection to the arts, and her siblings, Lucy, Arthur, Guy and David, all went on to become artists. Mary grew up at the Boyds' "Open Country" home in Murrumbeena, then a rural suburb on the outskirts of Melbourne. From an early age, Mary was taught painting and potting, though her formal education ended at age 14 when she left school.

Growing up in the Murrumbeena circle of artists, Mary was the contemporary of artists such as Albert Tucker, Sidney Nolan, and Danila Vassilieff. One of her most well known works, Hands, was influenced by the war years in Australia, and was created when she was only sixteen years old.

In 1944, the 18-year-old Mary married painter John Perceval, with Sidney Nolan as a witness. The marriage produced four children and saw her eventually depart from painting and ceramics. In the 1950s, Perceval produced studio pottery to earn money, and had started to gain critical attention as a painter. At this time, Mary began a friendship with John and Sunday Reed. In 1963 the family moved to London, settling in Highgate, and became part of a group of Australian artists living in the city. The family moved back to Australia in 1965 where Perceval undertook a fellowship at Canberra's Australian National University. The couple's relationship suffered due to Perceval's alcoholism and psychiatric issues, and their marriage ended in the early 1970s.

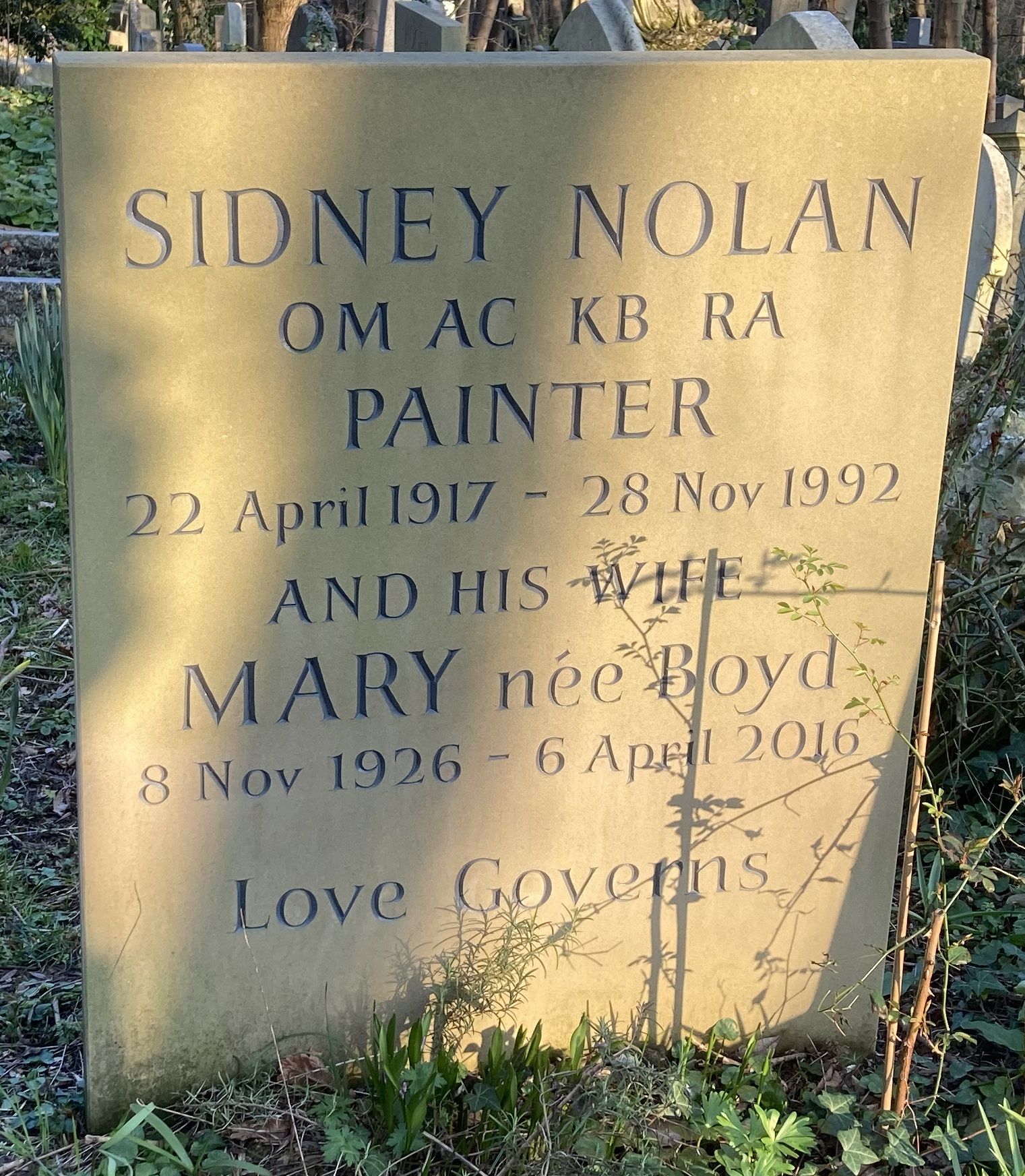
Grave of Mary Nolan in Highgate Cemetery

=== Life with Sidney Nolan ===
Mary moved back to London, living with her daughter Alice, and in 1975 relocated to a Herefordshire farmhouse,"The Ruthland", on the edge of Wales. She began a relationship, possibly romantic, with Sidney Nolan during the 1970s while his wife Cynthia was still alive. She had known Sidney from Australia and was aware of his previous relationships, including with Sunday Reed. Following Cynthia's suicide in 1976, Mary provided comfort to Sidney. The couple married in London in 1978 with her brother and sister-in-law Arthur and Yvonne as witnesses. The newly minted Nolans visited Australia for less than a month in March 1978 for Sidney's exhibition openings around the country. They also spent a week in Central Australia being followed around by a German film crew.

=== Children ===
Mary's four children with Perceval, Matthew (b. 1945), Tessa (b. 1947), Celia (b. 1949), and Alice (b. 1957) were all artists.

=== Death ===
Mary died on 6 April 2016 and she was buried with Sidney on the eastern side of Highgate Cemetery.
