= Merric Boyd =

Australian ceramicist

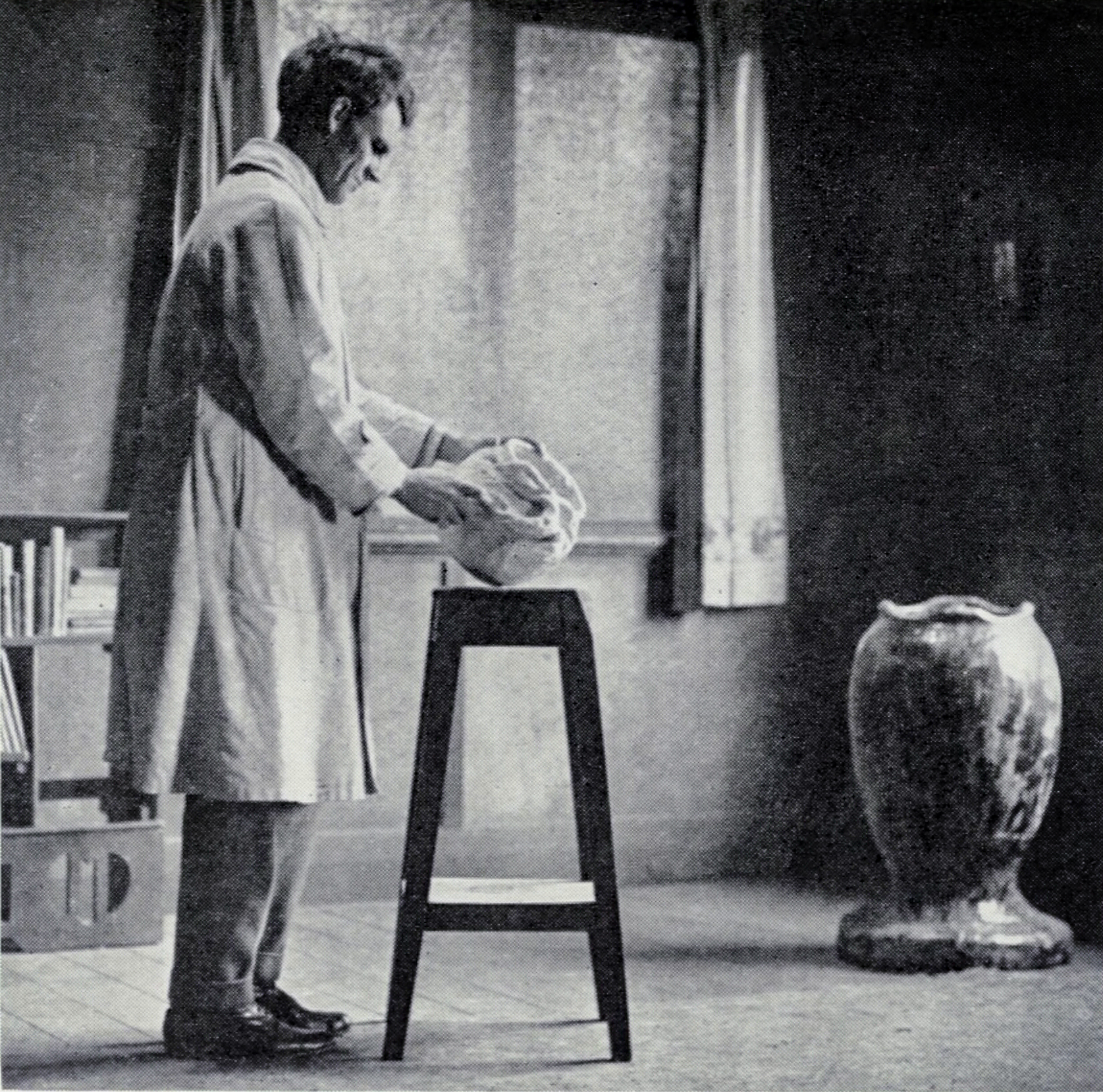
- Merric Boyd displaying an example of his work for The Home magazine at Murrumbeena 1920, photo: Pegg Clarke
- Born: William Merric Boyd; 24 June 1888; St Kilda, Victoria, Australia
- Died: 9 September 1959 (aged 71); Murrumbeena, Victoria, Australia
- Burial place: Brighton General Cemetery
- Education: National Gallery School
- Known for: Pottery
- Movement: Bernard Hall, Frederick McCubbin
- Spouse: Doris Boyd (née Gough) (m. 1915)
- Children: Arthur Boyd; David Boyd; Guy Boyd; daughters Lucy and Mary.
- Parents: Arthur Merric Boyd (father); Emma Minnie Boyd (mother)
- Relatives: Siblings: Penleigh Boyd; Martin Boyd; Helen Read

William Merric Boyd, known more as Merric Boyd (24 June 1888 – 9 September 1959), was an Australian artist, active as a ceramicist, sculptor, and in extensive chronicling of his family and surroundings in pencil drawing. He has been called the father of Australian studio pottery.

The Boyd family of many generations includes painters, sculptors, architects and other arts professionals, starting with Boyd's parents Arthur Merric Boyd and Emma Minnie Boyd. Boyd's brothers were Penleigh, a landscape artist, and Martin, a writer. He and his wife, Doris, raised the painters Arthur and David, and sculptor Guy. Their eldest daughter, Lucy, was a ceramic painter.

== Background ==
The second of five children of Arthur Merric Boyd (1862–1940) and Emma Minnie à Beckett (1858–1936), both established painters, Merric Boyd was born on 24 June 1888 in the Melbourne suburb of St Kilda, in Victoria. Arthur Merric Boyd and family were supported financially by Merric's maternal grandmother Emma à Beckett. It was Emma's fortune, inherited from her father John Mills, an ex-convict who founded the Melbourne Brewery, that allowed their family to live "comfortably". Boyd lived in Sandringham where he was educated at Haileybury College until he was eight. The family moved permanently to the family farm at Yarra Glen and Boyd attended Dookie Agricultural College with aspirations of turning his hand to farming; then he considered entering the Church of England as a clergyman, spending time studying at St John's Theological College, Melbourne; later supplying Martin Boyd with material for his award-winning 1955 novel, A Difficult Young Man.

== Career ==
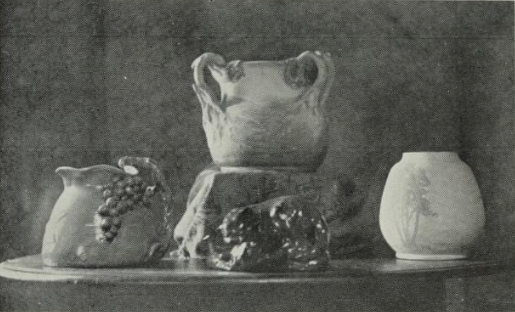
Pegg Clarke, Examples of Merric Boyd pottery in 1920, from The Home: an Australian quarterly, Vol. 2 No. 4, 1 December 1921 p. 60

In 1908 at Archibald McNair's Burnley Pottery, Boyd threw his first pot. Boyd set up a studio workshop on his home property at Murrumbeena and pottery kilns were established there in 1911 with the support of his family. He studied under Lindsay Bernard Hall and Frederick McCubbin at the National Gallery School, where he took up ceramics as a path to sculpture, but settled on pottery as his medium. He held his first exhibition of stoneware, fired in McNair Bros kiln, at the Centreway in Melbourne in 1912, and his second exhibition at Besant Lodge soon afterwards.

In 1915 he married Doris Lucy Eleanor Bloomfield Gough, a fellow student and painter, and they settled at Murrumbeena. Before enlisting for WW1, Boyd was employed by Hans Fyansch of the Australian Porcelain Works, Yarraville. Boyd joined the Australian Flying Corps but was discharged later in England before returning to Australia in September 1919. Before doing so, he undertook six months training in pottery technique at Josiah Wedgwood and Sons, Stoke-on-Trent, studying a diploma under Dr. Mellor at Stoke Technical School, and kiln construction under Mr. S. T. Wilson, former President of the English Ceramic Society.

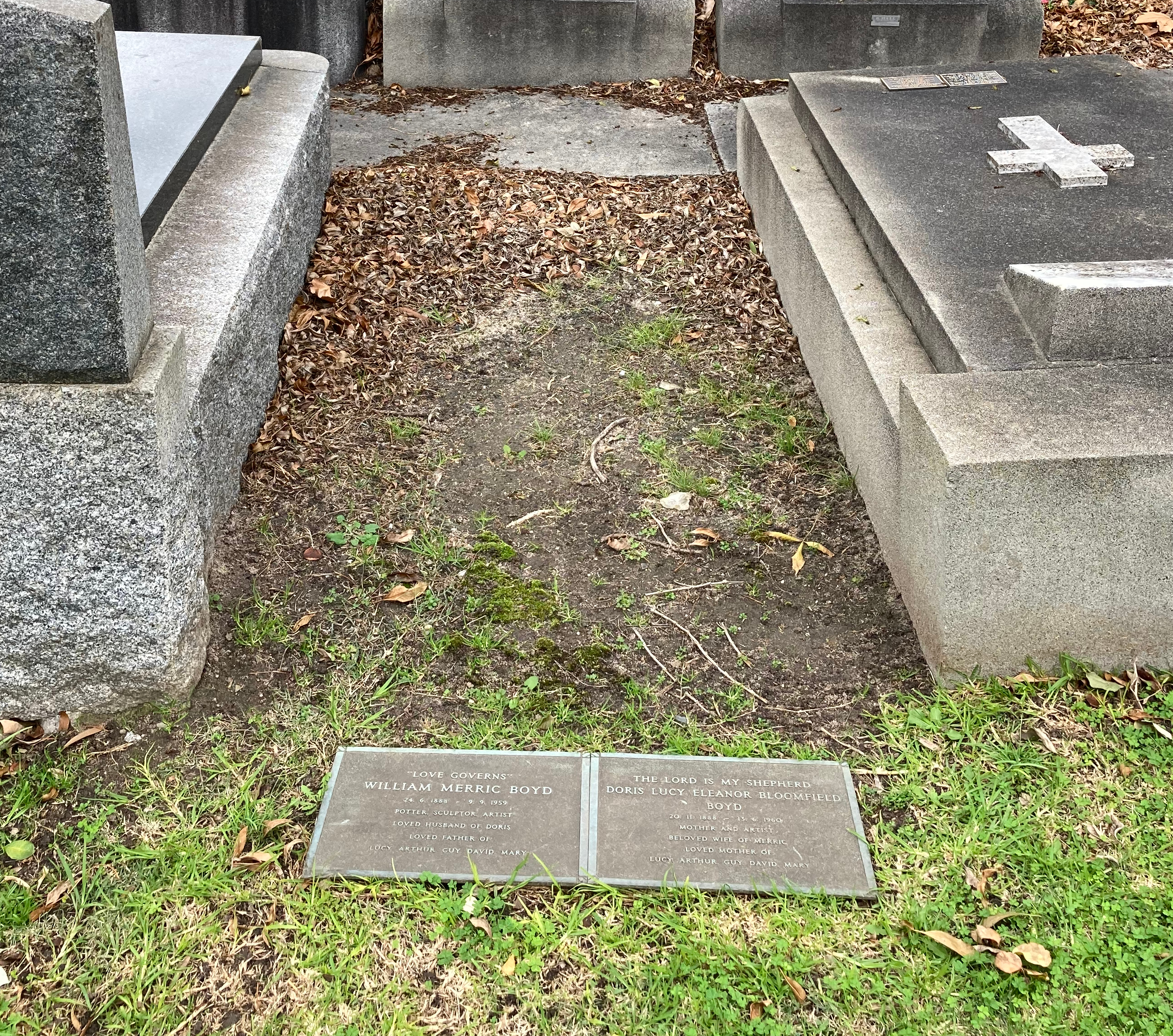
Graves of Merric and Doris Boyd at Brighton General Cemetery

Boyd's best works were produced between 1920 and 1930; mostly pieces for domestic use, often decorated by Doris, and some pottery sculptures. He and Doris often used Australian flora and fauna as decorative motifs, their concession to creating works that would sell well. The Boyd's Murrumbeena pottery was destroyed by fire in 1926. Boyd worked commercially and was able to provide for his family as he and Doris raised painters Arthur and David, and sculptor Guy and their two daughters Lucy and Mary. Mary, the youngest, married artists John Perceval, and later Sidney Nolan.

Subject to epilepsy, and somewhat of a recluse in his latter years with a strong interest in Christianity, Merric Boyd died at his home at Murrumbeena on 9 September 1959. His wife, Doris, died within the same dwelling alone nine months later. They were buried side-by-side at Brighton General Cemetery.

== See also ==
- Boyd family
- Australian art
