= Guy Boyd (sculptor) =

Australian sculptor (1923–1988)

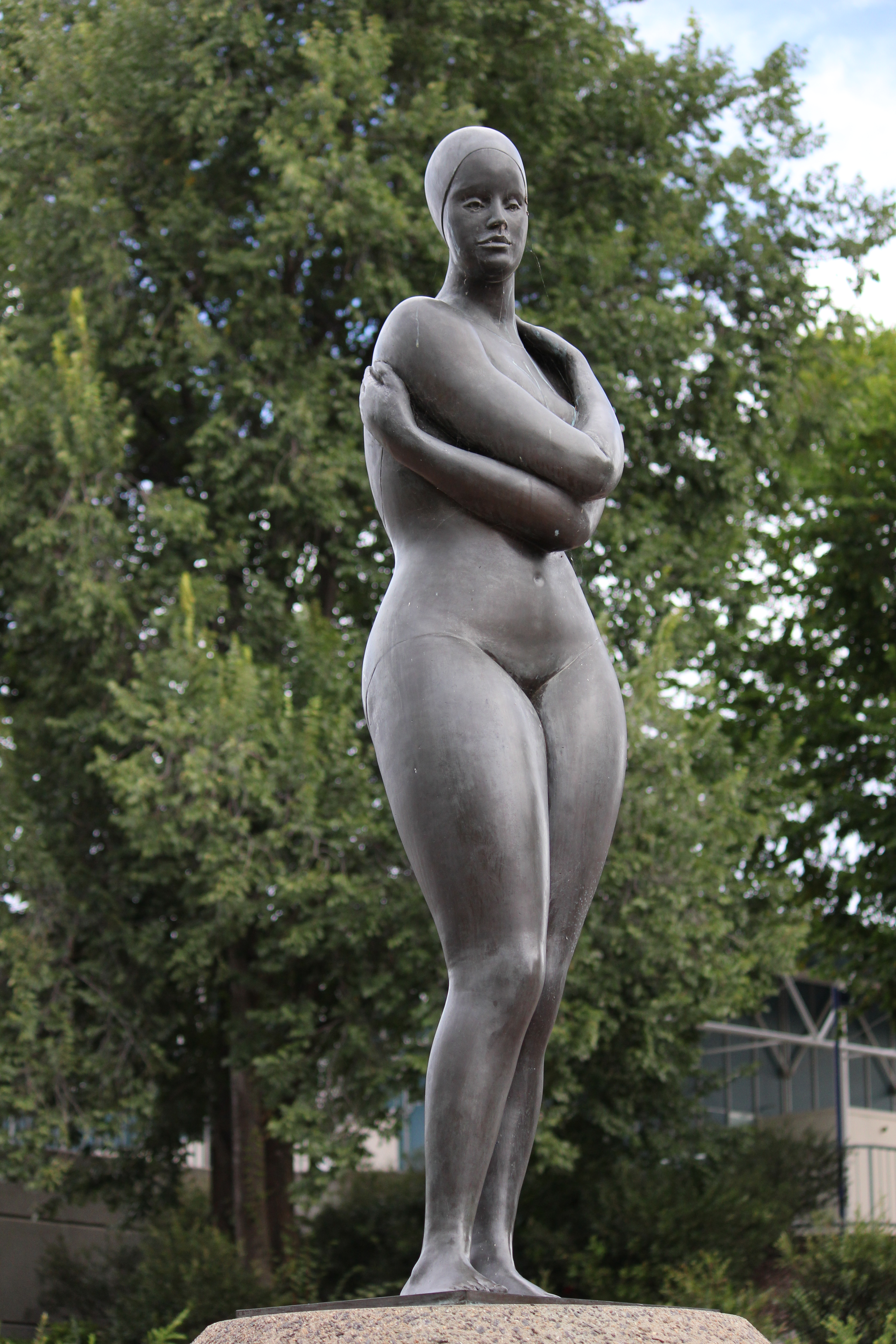
- The Swimmer at the Australian Institute of Sport, Canberra.
- Born: Guy Martin à Beckett Boyd; 12 June 1923; Murrumbeena, Victoria, Australia
- Died: 26 April 1988 (aged 64); Melbourne, Victoria, Australia
- Known for: Sculpture, pottery
- Spouse(s): Barbara Dawn Cooper (1950–52); Phyllis Nairn (1952– )

Guy Martin à Beckett Boyd (12 June 1923 – 26 April 1988) was an Australian potter and figurative sculptor noted for his ability to represent sensuality in the female nude with fluid forms. He was also active in environmental and other causes, including protesting against the damming of the Franklin River and advocating the innocence of Lindy Chamberlain.

== Background and early years ==
Born in Murrumbeena, Victoria, Guy was the third child of William Merric Boyd, potter, and his wife Doris Lucy Eleanor Bloomfield, née Gough, a painter, and thus was a member of the Boyd artist dynasty. Brother of Arthur and David, both painters, Lucy a potter, and Mary, a painter (who married first John Perceval, and then later Sidney Nolan, both artists), he grew up in his father's pottery.

The Boyd family artistic dynasty includes painters, sculptors, architects, writers and other arts professionals, and descends from Boyd's grandfather Arthur Merric Boyd, Boyd's father Merric and mother Doris, uncles Penleigh Boyd and Martin Boyd.

After the privations of the Great Depression followed by a disastrous fire at his father's pottery, where he was assistant, in 1937 Boyd found work first as a jeweller's apprentice, then in a number of jobs, including at a nuts and bolts factory and as a builder's labourer. In 1941–46 he served in the Australian Army Reserve, however as a committed pacifist he was deployed as a draughtsman in Melbourne and then at Fortuna mansion in Bendigo, before conflicts with his superiors resulted in his being posted interstate in 1944 to the 103rd Convalescent Depot, Ingleburn, where he volunteered to teach pottery to the patients. Examples of the injured combatants' work were exhibited in Sydney in 1945.

== Career ==
=== Ceramicist ===
After World War 2, Boyd worked as a potter, establishing both Martin Boyd Pottery and later Guy Boyd Pottery. These studios mass-produced a wide range of modernist objects from house-wares to decorative pieces which enjoyed strong commercial success. Iconic Australian imagery, particularly flora and indigenous motifs, feature frequently. This period of work is also steeped in the 'atomic age' aesthetics of the 1950s and early 1960s with a familiar colour palette and shapes that strongly echo Eames and others.

=== Sculptor ===
Boyd turned away from this commercial work and to a full-time career in sculpture in 1965 when he held his first solo show at Australian Galleries in Melbourne. His commissions include sculptures in both Melbourne and Sydney's international airports, Caulfield Town Hall, the Commonwealth Bank, and has pieces in the National Gallery of Victoria, Melbourne. He had exhibitions of his work in Australia, the United Kingdom, Canada, and the United States. In 1968 he won a Churchill Fellowship to study art overseas. He was recognised with a large format monograph, Guy Boyd written by gallerist Anne Von Bertouch and art historian Patrick Hutchins and published by Lansdowne Press. Later that year Guy and Phyllis migrated to Canada with their four younger children, settling in Toronto in 1976, but returned to live in Australia five years later in Sandringham, Victoria. He was appointed the Art Advisor to Deakin University in 1988.

== Technique ==
Boyd's early sculptures and reliefs were mostly in terracotta and plaster. James Gleeson, writing in the Sun-Herald, Sydney in June 1966 provides insight into Boyd's choice of sculptural medium during his transition from the ceramic industry, his method of working, and its influence on the forms he favoured:

Boyd's technique is not merely original (for that in itself is not necessarily a virtue), it is original and entirely at one with the intention of the artist. He has perfected the ideal means for saying what he wants to say, so the originality of his technique is also artistically important. First stage in the transmutation of nature into art is a wax model. This is the creative stage when the soft wax must be thumbed into a work of art that is alive with the vibrancy of nature. The next stage is the plating of the model with silver or copper, but the usual process would smooth away the subtleties of surface modelling and destroy its vitality. So the wax effigy sits in its acid bath for weeks on end and a very low charge of electricity gradually deposits a paper thin layer of metal on its surface. The wax is chemically dissolved, the shell is strengthened on the inside and finally filled with a plastic stone that will neither expand nor contract to endanger the metal skin.

Boyd also experimented with an electrolytic deposition of silver combined with a layer of copper, but abandoned that after finding that applying heated carbon tetrachloride to dissolve the wax from the metal shell was affecting his health. Boyd discontinued the electroplating with powdered granite compound infill described above in 1966, and the majority of his mature work is fine-face bronze casts using the lost wax process, in which he innovated through the admixture of silicon with wax, with editions of usually six produced in bronze and aluminium. Often a thin finish in silver is applied over the bronze or aluminium cast, oxidised to near-black then burnished lightly to reveal texture in relief; his 1971 Aboriginal Legend of Flight, commissioned for Sydney Kingsford Smith International Airport arrivals gate, after an earlier version (1969) for Tullamarine Airport, is an example. It is five and a half metres in width, modelled in clay, cast in plaster and then sand-cast in aluminium in 27 sections, coated in sterling silver over nickel and copper layers, then oxidised before being bolted together and the joins concealed. It is displayed against a black Swedish marble wall.

Of his working technique, art historian, art critic and curator Sasha Grishin noted that Boyd worked directly with his wax or clay, rather than through preparatory drawings, accepting the modelling and subtraction of material, and revelation of the unexpected, as crucial to the creative process.

== Subject matter and critical reception ==
Boyd adhered to figuration throughout his career, though he rarely worked directly from the model and preferred to rely on his memory of bodies in movement and of gestures. His subjects are mostly girls and women and for the earliest of his exhibitions of the 1960s he referred to record covers and magazine pictures of African dancers. Often figures are drawn from experience of his large family and observations of bathers at Brighton beach, with some groups of mother and child, or of lovers, along with a few portraits. Much of the work makes reference to mythology, particularly to stories of transformation.

Bernard Smith in 1965 noted that "Stance and gesture are caught lyrically and sensuously" by Boyd, and he admired the way "oxidised surfaces, burnished along the ridges, achieve a jewel-like beauty of texture".

Elwyn Lynn had a mixed reaction to Boyd's early exhibition at Bonython's Hungry Horse Gallery in a review in The Australian, 4 June 1966; "He is best in the silvery, blackened, self-contained pieces when the figure is preoccupied with some simple, inevitable gesture. Lapses are profound: one gauche bronze dancing girl must be destined for a suburban garden and a mother and child is embarrassing in execution and sentiment", but goes on to admit "facile virtuosity is countered by breaking surfaces with light catching impressionist touches [...] lissom yet awkward poses [...] delight in their skill"

Reviewing one of Boyd's last shows, at Beaver Galleries in Canberra, Sacha Grishin writing in The Canberra Times in 1987, contrasts the sculptor's Boyd family inheritance of "figurative humanism" against the prevailing abstract sculpture imitative of Anthony Caro. Describing Boyd as never having been a "fashionable sculptor" he praises his avoidance of "slick" realism and his concentration on the human figure as a "vehicle for communicating ideas", his ability to convey beauty without "sentimentalism" and to represent freedom in movement through "an exciting resolution of the arrangement of volumes within graceful floating lines".

Professor Patrick Hutchings' discussion of the sculpture in the 1979 monograph attributes Boyd's fascination with transformation and change to his inheritance of a Boyd "clan style", "a family theme, one of metamorphosis", a motif evident in a 1948 two-handled pot by his father Merric, which Guy had kept.

== Activism ==
A determined and natural leader, in 1967 Boyd founded and was President of the Brighton Foreshore Protection Committee; he was vocal in condemning inappropriate development and council corruption in the suburb, where he had settled after purchasing and restoring a house that was once his grandparents', and advocated for councillors to be paid in order to attract candidates less compromised than those who were real estate agents and property developers. His campaigns resulted in the defeat of a proposal to build a marina at Brighton and the halting of a high-pressure oil pipeline that was to be extended by Esso and BHP under Port Phillip Bay. A plaque commemorating his achievements in preservation and conservation was later erected on the beach at Brighton.

After he, Phyllis Boyd and daughters Lenore and Sally, were early involved in calls for a judicial inquiry into Lindy Chamberlain's trial which resulted in a charge of the murder of her baby daughter, they were active in drawing up a petition entitled 'A Plea for Mercy'. He became the Australian Co-ordinator of the effort and, in 1984, edited the book Justice in Jeopardy in Chamberlain's defence. In 1983, as a member of the Tasmanian Wilderness Society, Boyd lobbied against the Tasmanian State Government's plan to dam the Franklin River.

=== Death ===
Boyd died 26 April 1988 from coronary atherosclerosis and was buried with Anglican rites in Brighton cemetery. His wife, Phyllis, and their five daughters and two sons, survived him. Critic Sasha Grishin, in marking Boyd's passing, called him "one of our most significant post-war figurative sculptors".

== Exhibitions ==
=== Solo ===
- 1965: Australian Galleries, Melbourne
- 1965: Bonython Art Gallery, Adelaide
- 1966: Bonython's Hungry Horse Art Gallery, Sydney
- 1967: Australian Galleries, Melbourne
- 1967: The Johnstone Gallery, Brisbane
- 1968: Bonython Art Gallery, Adelaide
- 1968: Von Bertouch Galleries, Newcastle
- 1969: The Johnstone Gallery, Brisbane
- 1970: The Leicester Galleries, London
- 1970: Bonython Art Gallery, Sydney
- 1971: Andrew Ivanyi Galleries, Melbourne
- 1971: Von Bertouch Galleries, Newcastle
- 1971: Skinner Galleries, Perth
- 1972: Bonython Art Gallery, Adelaide
- 1972: The Johnstone Gallery, Brisbane
- 1973: Manyung Galleries, Victoria
- 1973: Von Bcrtouch Galleries, Newcastle
- 1973: Skinner Galleries, Perth
- 1974: Andrew Ivanyi Galleries, Melbourne
- 1974: Phillip Bacon Galleries, Brisbane
- 1975: Greenhill Galleries, Adelaide
- 1975: Andrew Ivanyi Galleries, Melbourne
- 1976: von Bertouch Galleries, Newcastle
- 1976: Philip Bacon Galleries, Brisbane
- 1976: Dominion Gallery, Montreal
- 1977: The Randall Gallery, New York
- 1978: Philip Bacon Galleries, Brisbane
- 1978: Retrospective: The Australian Embassy, Washington DC
- 1979: Shaw Gallery, Toronto
- 1980: The Randall Gallery, New York
- 1980: Philip Bacon Galleries, Brisbane
- 1981: von Bertouch Galleries, Newcastle
- 1981: Holdsworth Galleries, Sydney
- 1982: Philip Bacon Galleries, Brisbane
- 1983: von Bertouch Galleries, Newcastle
- 1983: Holdsworth Galleries, Sydney
- 1984: Greenhill Galleries, Perth
- 1984: Niagara Galleries, Melbourne
- 1984: Philip Bacon Galleries, Brisbane
- 1985: von Bertouch Galleries, Newcastle
- 1985: Holdsworth Galleries, Sydney
- 1985: Golden Age (David Ellis) Gallery, Ballarat
- 1986: Clarkson University, New York
- 1987: Philip Bacon Galleries, Brisbane
- 1987: David Ellis Fine Art, Melbourne
- 1987: Beaver Galleries, Deakin, Canberra
- 1988: Holdsworth Galleries, Sydney
- 1988: Greenhill Galleries, Perth

=== Posthumous solo ===
- 1989: von Bertouch Galleries, Newcastle
- 1990: Philip Bacon Galleries, Brisbane

=== Group ===
From 1945, Guy Boyd exhibited in group shows in all Australian State capitals, with representation as recently as 2012, and overseas, including Leicester Galleries, London in 1957, and at galleries in New York, San Francisco and Montreal.

== Awards ==
1968: Churchill Fellowship

== Collections and Commissions ==
- Australian National Gallery, Canberra
- National Gallery of Victoria, Melbourne
- Art Gallery of New South Wales, Sydney
- Australian National University
- University of Melbourne, Melbourne
- University of Newcastle, Newcastle
- University of Wollongong
- McClelland Sculpture Park and Gallery, Melbourne
- Colac Otway Sculpture Park
- Churchill House, Canberra
- International Airport, Melbourne
- International Airport, Sydney
- Prudential Art Museum, Toronto
- Art Gallery of Ballarat
- La Trobe University, Melbourne
- Monash University, Melbourne
- Australian Institute of Sport, Canberra
- Newcastle Art Gallery
- Museum and Art Gallery of the Northern Territory, Darwin
- Deakin University
- Australian Catholic University
- Clarkson University, New York
- Shepparton Art Museum

The bronze Lovers given to Melbourne University by Boyd and housed in the fourth floor bridge in the John Medley Building, was stolen and never been recovered. Boyd provided a replacement, a bather figure for the east garden of University House.

== Published works ==
- Boyd, Guy, ed. (1984). Justice in jeopardy: twelve witnesses speak out. Cheltenham, Vic.: Guy Boyd: distributed by Kingfisher Books. p. 207. ISBN 0-9591142-0-3.

== Bibliography ==
- Niall, Brenda (2002). The Boyds. Melbourne: Melbourne University Press. ISBN 0-522-84871-0.
- Von Bertouch, Anne; Hutchings, Patrick; Boyd, Guy Martin a'Beckett, 1923- (1976), Guy Boyd, Melbourne Lansdowne Press, ISBN 978-0-7018-0079-6
- Scarlett, Ken (1980), Australian Sculptors, Nelson
- Barbara A Rothermel (1989) The life and works of Australian sculptor Guy Boyd, 1923-1988, Thesis, M.L.S. University of Oklahoma 1989.

== See also ==
- Australian art
- Boyd family
