= Emma Minnie Boyd =

Australian artist (1858–1936)

Emma Boyd
- Born: Emma Minnie à Beckett; 23 November 1858; Collingwood, Victoria, Australia
- Died: 13 September 1936 (aged 77); Sandringham, Victoria, Australia
- Known for: Landscape painting
- Spouse: Arthur Merric Boyd
- Children: Penleigh Boyd; Merric Boyd; Martin Boyd; Helen Read
- Parents: William Arthur à Beckett (father); Emma à Beckett (née Mills) (mother)
- Relatives: Arthur Boyd; Guy Boyd (grandsons)

Emma Minnie Boyd (23 November 1858—13 September 1936), born Emma Minnie à Beckett, was an Australian artist.

Boyd exhibited publicly between 1874 and 1932. She showed with the Victorian Artists Society, the Centennial International Exhibition 1888 (Melbourne), the Royal Academy of Arts (London), and in a joint show with her husband at Como House in Melbourne in 1902, amongst other venues. Over one hundred pounds worth of artworks were sold at the 1902 exhibition and commissions were given for further copies of works sold. She had a talent for watercolour landscapes, although she painted in both watercolour and oil, and a mix of interiors, figures, portraits, still life and flower studies. She is part of the Boyd Artistic Dynasty, an Australian artist family, which began with Emma and her husband Arthur and the work that they created that influenced their children and grandchildren to pursue artistic careers.

== Early life ==
Emma Minnie Boyd, nee à Beckett was born in Melbourne in on 23 November 1858. She was the second child of her parents William Arthur à Beckett and Emma Mills à Beckett. Her mother Emma Mills à Beckett was the Heiress of the John Mills fortune. Emma Minnie Boyd was known by her second name “Minnie” so as not to be confused for her mother. Partly thanks to her mother’s fortune, Emma Minnie Boyd lived a very comfortable life with her family, growing up in Melbourne. From an early age she showed an interest in the arts, painting and drawing particularly. Her family would indulge her by posing for her early portraits. Her parents were well off and supporters of the arts. They encouraged her talents and were able to support her and give her a happy and privileged childhood. She studied at the National Gallery of Victoria School and exhibited regularly while studying.

== Marriage ==
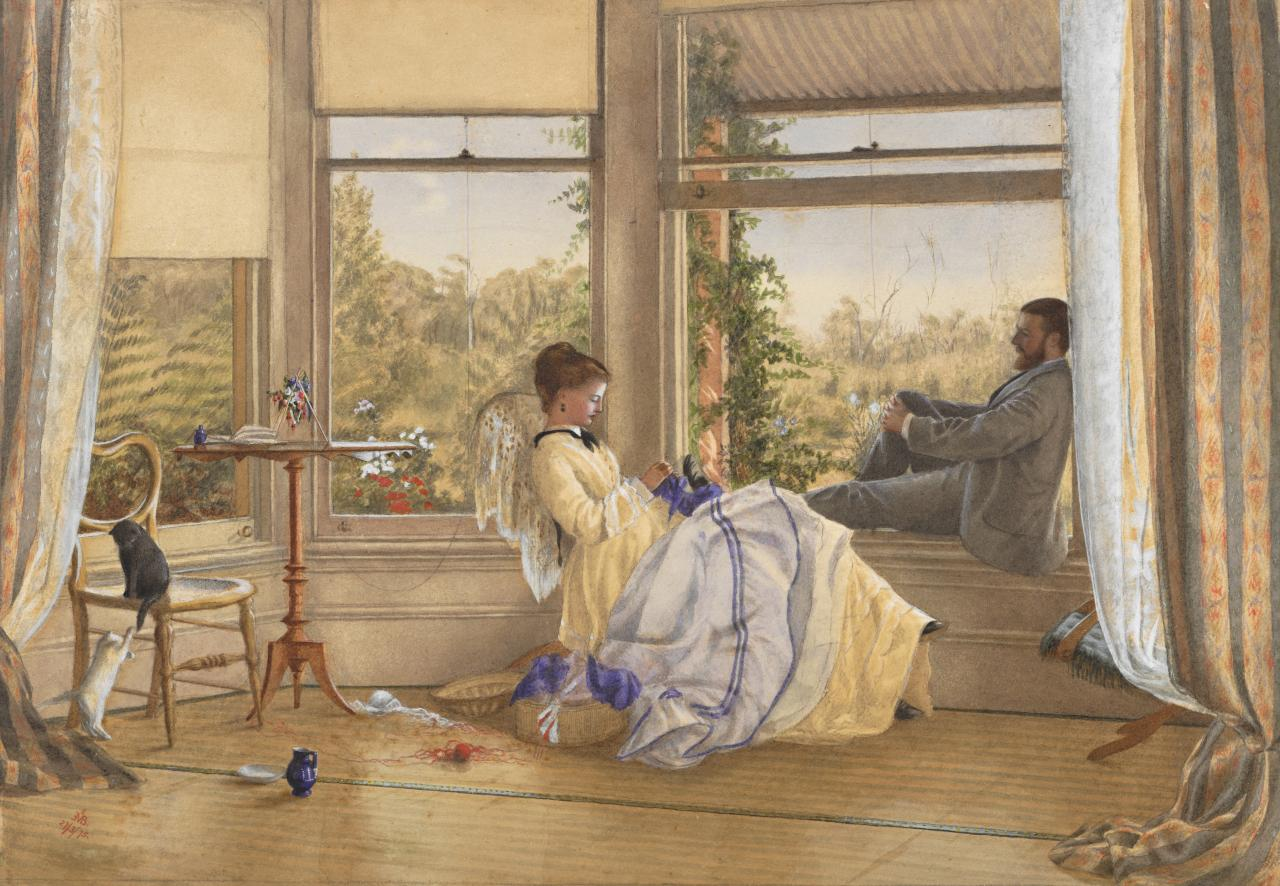
Interior with Figures, The Grange

She married Arthur Merric Boyd in 1886. He was born in New Zealand in 1862 and was the son of a military officer, he was also an aspiring artist. His family moved to Melbourne in the mid-1870s where Arthur Merric Boyd began to train as a painter but without the same familial support that his wife received from her family. They met while they were at art school together. It was fortunate for Arthur Merric Boyd that he married into a wealthy family. His own parents would have been unable to support him as making a good living as an artist, especially with his own family to look after, would have been difficult. The à Beckett's were able to give the young couple and their children the means to pursue careers in the arts.

Together Arthur and Minnie had five children, Gilbert born 1886, who was tragically killed in a fall from a horse in 1896, Merric Boyd born 1888, Penleigh Boyd 1890, Martin Boyd in 1893, and her youngest and only daughter Helen 1903. All her children were involved in the arts, including Helen who became a painter. After her marriage Emma Minnie and Arthur Merric Boyd continued to receive support from her family. They moved into one of the family homes, The Grange, where they began raising their own family. As a woman who was well off, she had nannies to help her with the children and servants to help her with the house, duties expected of women in this time. This allowed her to continue to work even after starting a family.

== Career ==
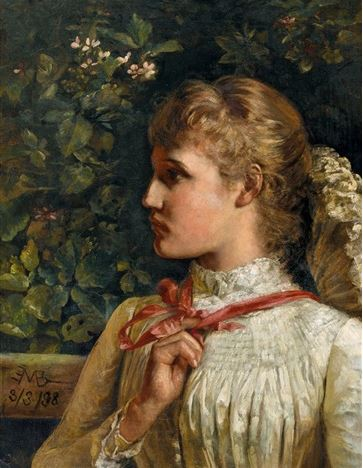
A Lassie Yet

Emma Minnie Boyd was a prolific painter and exhibited her work frequently. She was one of the more versatile Australian artists and her work was varied. She was a contemporary of Artists like Charles Conder, Arthur Streeton, Frederick McCubbin and Tom Roberts and her work was exhibited alongside theirs. Both the Boyd’s were acquainted with the artists who worked at the Heidelberg School but family and circumstance prevented them from also taking part. As a newly married couple they would be expected to set up house together and see about starting a family, it would not have been appropriate for them to be gallivanting across the countryside with a group of other painters. Because of this it is possible that both their careers could have suffered without the professional relationships and recognition the Heidelberg school achieved with the public.

Emma Minnie Boyd also worked with Louis Buvelot, with whom she shared a facility for landscape watercolour “and a cautious tonal impressionism, with its persistent echoes of the Dutch school.” In 1890 the Boyd’s went to Europe to work, with their two young sons, where their work was shown at the Royal academy of the Arts, Boyd made several works during her time there. she was a religious woman and painted many of her social conscience works overseas. The loss of family investments in the crash of the Melbourne land boom brought Emma and her husband back to Melbourne, where she taught art students in her city studio.

Her work Interior with figures, The Grange 1875 shows her talent for watercolour. Painted when she was just sixteen it is a snapshot of Australian life. The large bay window is shaded by galvanised iron typical of Australian homes of the period. The interior is relaxed, with the window opened. A young Man sits on the window ledge not quite inside or outside the room, his companion, a young woman is seated inside, sewing. There is a relaxed atmosphere with the messy sewing box and two cats playing by a chair to the left of the painting. The spatial relationship of the kittens imitates that of the man and the woman. It comments on the relaxed atmosphere and social obligations that were a part of colonial society in Australia. Even during Victorian times social standards and decorum was not as strict as it was in Britain.

She painted many watercolour landscape paintings of the Australian Bush; these works were popular with the public because the Australian landscape is quite unique to Australia and it represented a sense of national pride leading up to federation in 1901.

She died at Sandringham on 13 September 1936, survived by two of her sons and her daughter.

== Legacy ==
For many years she has been documented only as the mother of significant artists Penleigh Boyd and Merric Boyd and novelist Martin Boyd (her daughter Helen Read was also a prolific artist), and grandmother of Arthur Boyd and Guy Boyd but she was one of the most prolific and consistent women artists of her generation in Melbourne, with a career that significantly outlasted that of Jane Sutherland, for example. Emma Minnie Boyd's art was shown in its own right as works of historical and curatorial merit in the 1992–1993 touring exhibition Completing the Picture: Women Artists and the Heidelberg School, at the Heide Museum of Modern Art and elsewhere, and in a retrospective in 2004 at the Mornington Peninsula Regional Gallery.

== Selected paintings ==
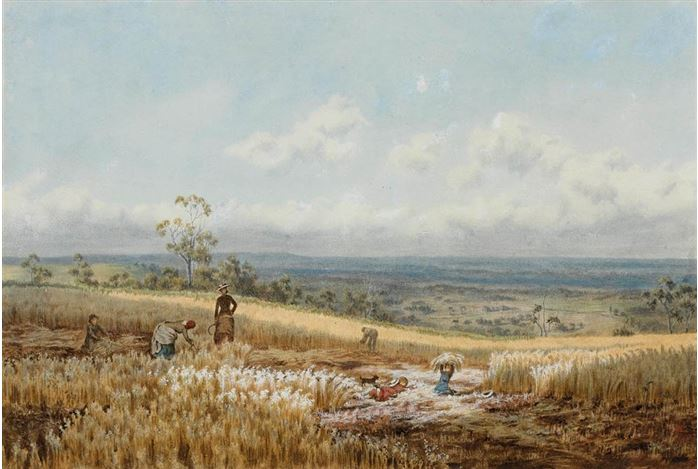
Harkaway Landscape

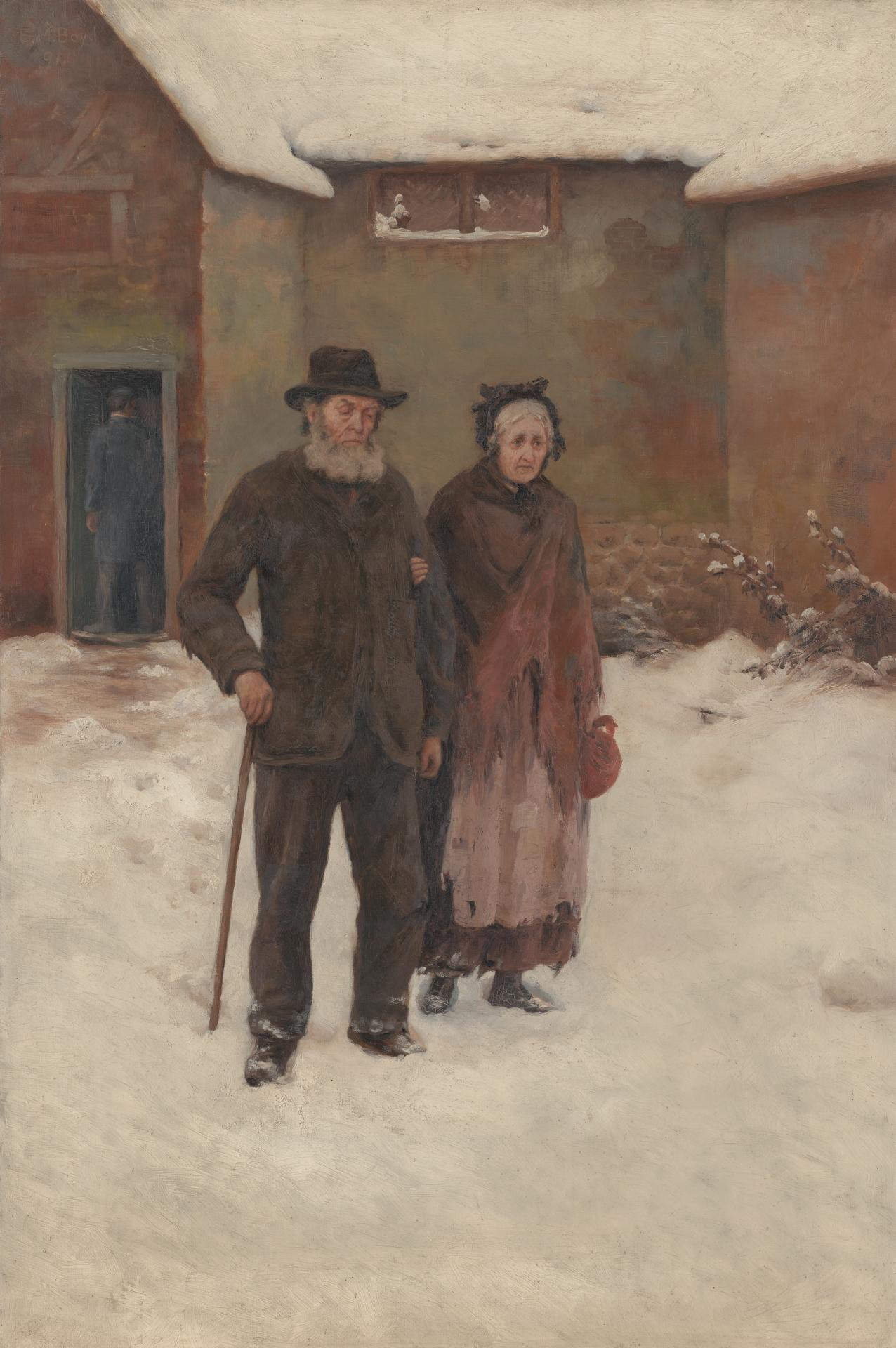
To the Workhouse

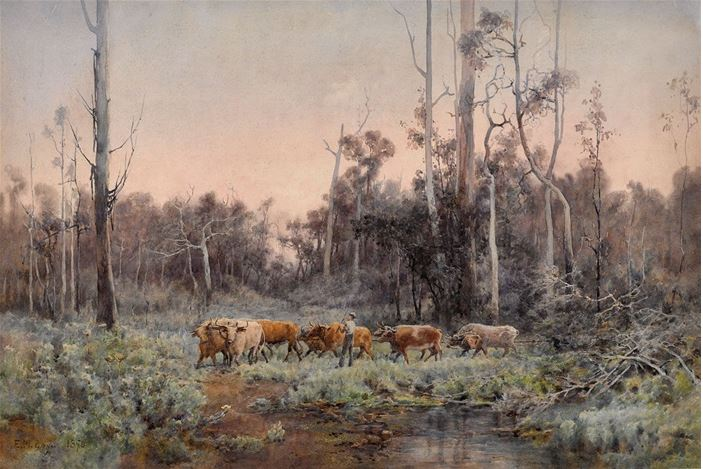
The Last Load

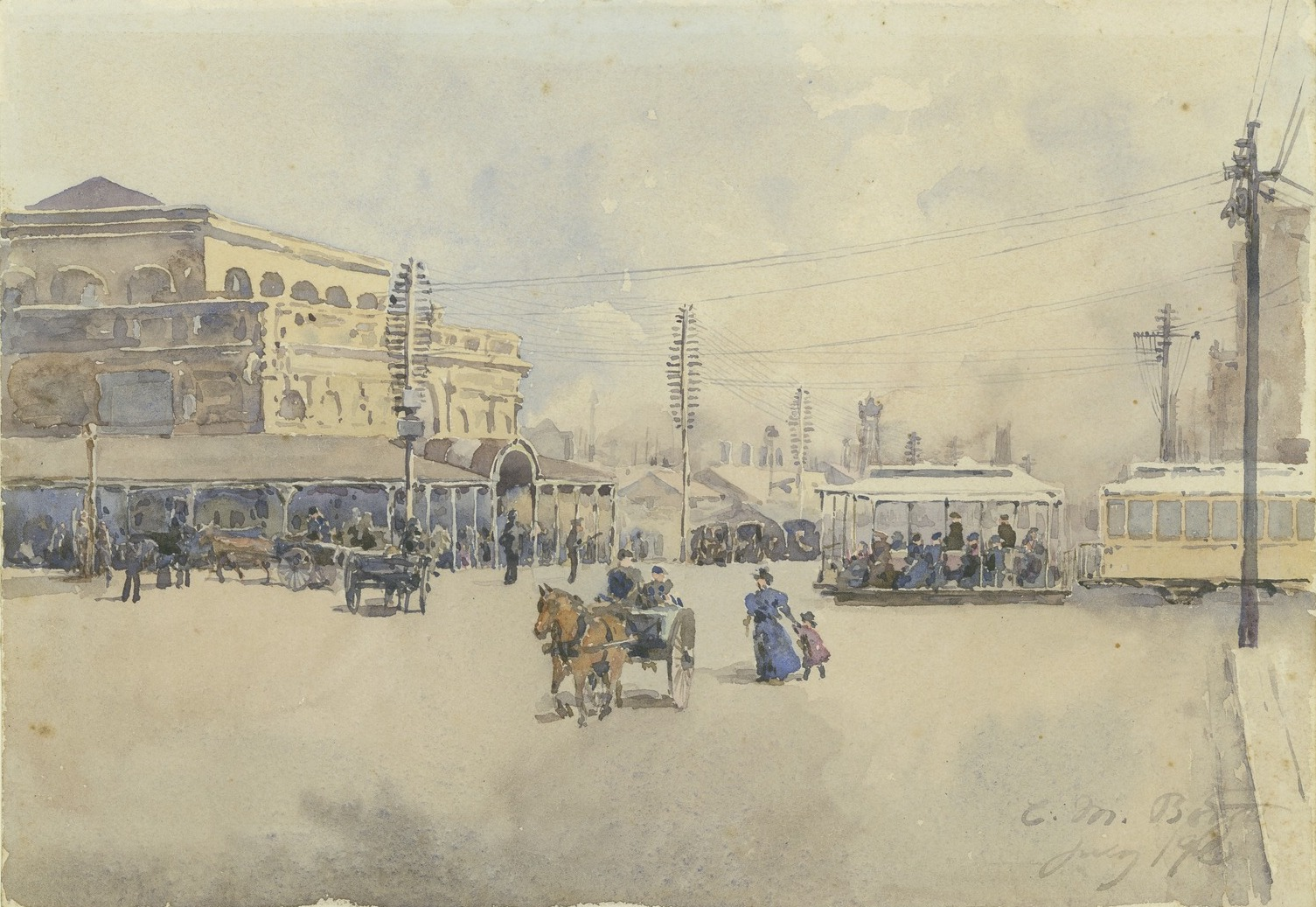
Fish market; corner of Swanston street and Flinders street
