= Arthur Merric Boyd =

Australian artist (1862–1940)

- Born: 19 March 1862; Opoho, Dunedin, New Zealand
- Died: 30 July 1940 (aged 78); Murrumbeena, Victoria, Australia
- Known for: Landscape painting
- Movement: Boyd family
- Spouse: Emma Minnie Boyd
- Children: Penleigh Boyd; Merric Boyd; Martin Boyd; Helen Read
- Parents: Captain John Theodore Thomas Boyd (father); Lucy Charlotte (née Martin) (mother)
- Relatives: Grandsons: Arthur Boyd; Guy Boyd

Arthur Merric Boyd (19 March 1862 – 30 July 1940) was an Australian painter. He and his wife Emma Minnie (née à Beckett) established a lifestyle of being artists, which many generations followed to create the popular image of the Boyd family.

== Biography ==
Boyd was born in Opoho, Dunedin, New Zealand, son of Captain John Theodore Thomas Boyd, formerly of County Mayo, Ireland, and his wife Lucy Charlotte, daughter of Dr Robert Martin of Heidelberg, Victoria. The Boyds moved to Australia in the mid-1870s, and on 14 January 1886, Boyd married Emma Minnie à Beckett, also an artist and known as Minnie, daughter of the Hon. W. A. C. à Beckett of Melbourne. In 1890, they moved to England and lived for a time at Penleigh House, Westbury, Wiltshire.

Minnie Boyd died at Melbourne on 13 September 1936 at Sandringham. Arthur Merric Boyd died on the property of his son, Merric, at Murrumbeena on 30 July 1940. Each is represented by a picture in the National Gallery of Victoria in Melbourne. They left three sons, Theodore Penleigh Boyd (1890–1923), Martin à Beckett Boyd (1893–1972), a popular writer of fiction firstly under the name 'Martin Mills' and then his own, and Merric (1888–1959), a potter, and a daughter Helen à Beckett Boyd, a painter.

== Selected paintings ==
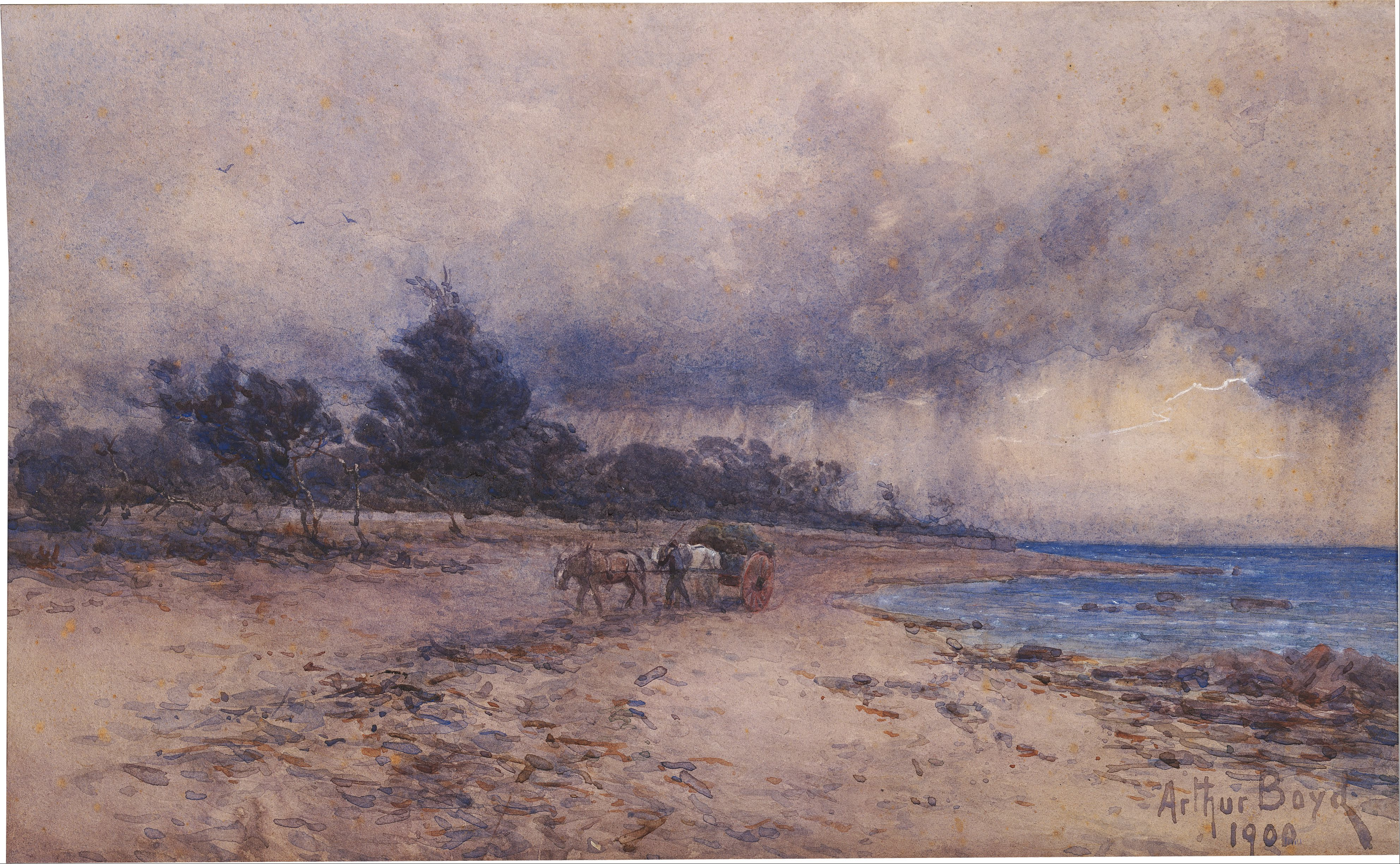
Gathering Seaweed Before the Storm, Sandringham Beach

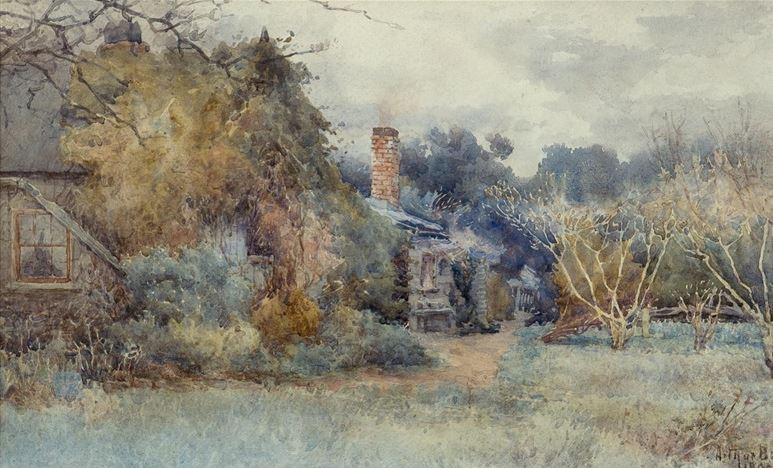
Winter Evening

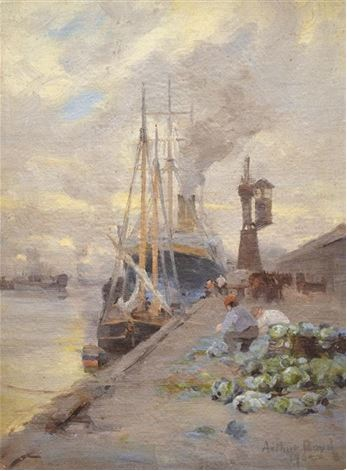
North Wharf, Melbourne

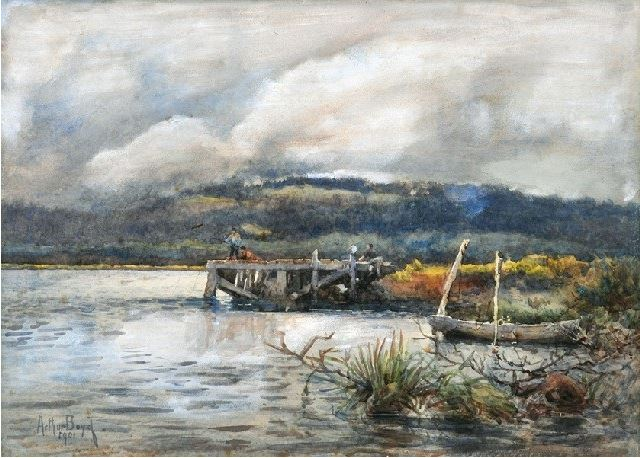
Fishing at the Jetty
