= Murrumbeena, Victoria =

Murrumbeena
- Suburb
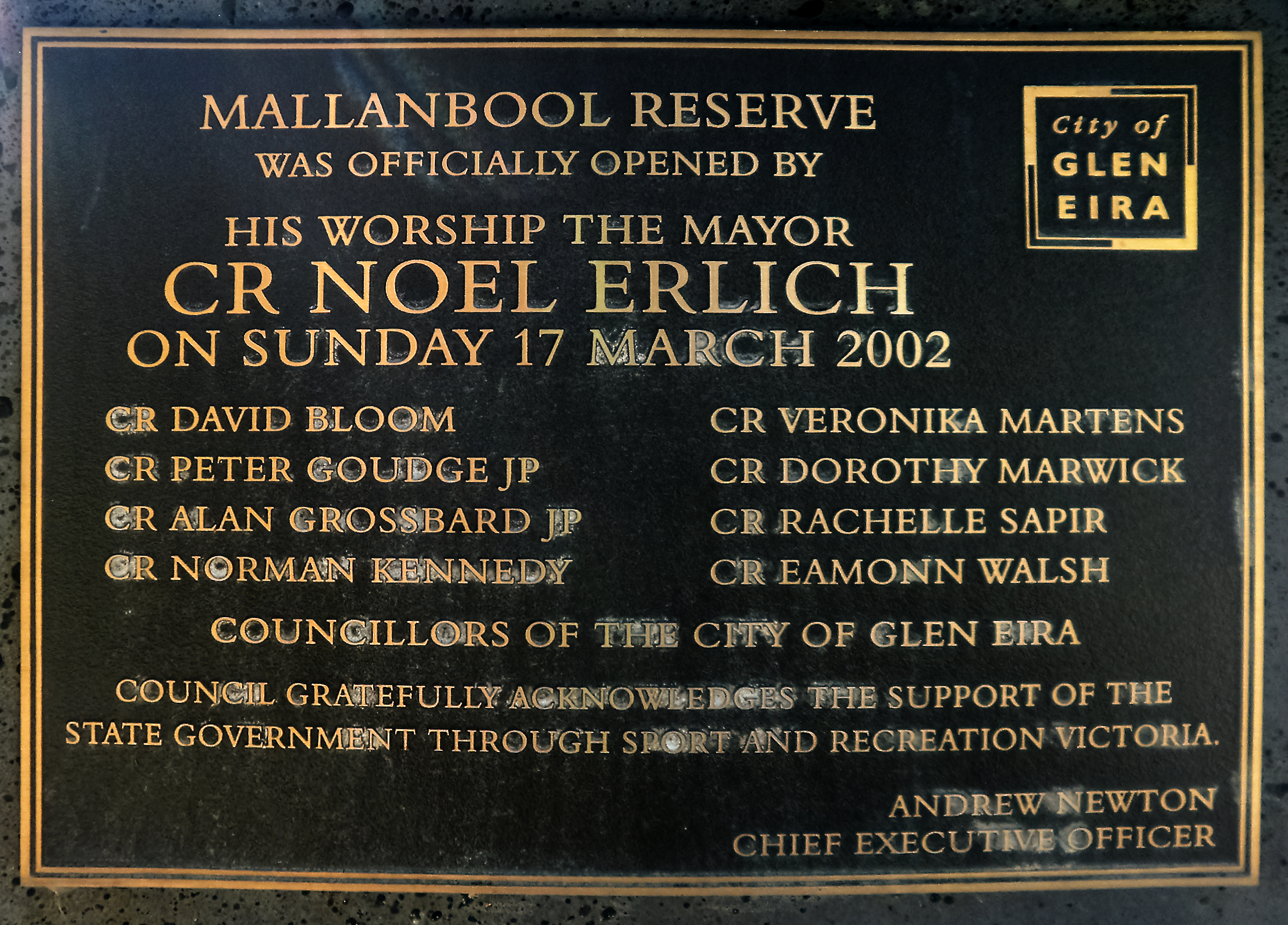
- City of Glen Eira plaque at Mallanbool Reserve, Murrumbeena

- Interactive map of Murrumbeena
- Coordinates: 37.899°S 145.072°E
- Country: Australia
- State: Victoria
- City: Melbourne
- LGA: City of Glen Eira
- Location: 13 km (8.1 mi) from Melbourne

Government
  - State electorate: Oakleigh
  - Federal division: Hotham

Area
  - Total: 2.5 km^{2} (0.97 sq mi)

Population
  - Total: 9,369 (SAL 2021)
- Postcode: 3163
Suburbs around Murrumbeena
Malvern East	Malvern East	Malvern East
Carnegie	Murrumbeena	Hughesdale
Bentleigh East	Bentleigh East	Bentleigh East

Murrumbeena (/ˌmʌrəmˈbiːnə/ MURR-əm-BEE-nə) is a suburb in Melbourne, Victoria, Australia, 13 km south-east of Melbourne's Central Business District, located within the City of Glen Eira local government area. Murrumbeena recorded a population of 9,996 at the 2021 census.

Murrumbeena is a small and coveted suburban area with parklands and artistic heritage.

It has multiple commercial zones featuring services and cafes, including Murrumbeena Village, near the train station; Poath Road; North Road; and Murrumbeena Road, near the Beauville Estate and Duncan McKinnon Reserve.

== Toponymy ==
The name "Murrumbeena" derives from the Aboriginal word "mirambena." It may have meant "land of frogs", "moss growing on decayed wood" or it may be a derivative from the name of an Aboriginal elder. The evidence for any of these etymologies is uncertain. The name was officially adopted when the Murrumbeena railway station opened in 1879.

== History ==
The Boon Wurrung, the Indigenous Australians of the Kulin Nation, are recognised as the traditional owners of the land now known as Murrumbeena.

A more in-depth look at Murrumbeena’s history and historic photos can be found at Glen Eira Historical Society's Victorian Collections page and at Murrumbeena 3163.

- 14 May 1879 – Murrumbeena Railway station opens and the name Murrumbeena is officially adopted for the settlement
- 21 September 1889 – Railway station signal box contract signed to erect by J. Brown.
- 12 May 1890 – Murrumbeena Post Office opens
- 1891 – A Murrumbeena football team competes against Oakleigh and other clubs.
- 1900 – Film segments of Soldiers of the Cross, the world's first narrative drama film presentation, are shot at Murrumbeena Girls Home.
- 1918 – Murrumbeena Football Club is formed
- 1921 – Merric Boyd opens Australia's first pottery studio at Open Country, 8 Wahroonga Crescent
- 1922 – Electrification of railway & wicket gates
- 12 May 1923 - Murrumbeena Bowls Club is formed and plays at 'The Green', a 4 rink private bowling green owned by A. W. P. Olsen, a local Real Estate Agent at 'Oakdene' 41 Murrumbeena Road
- 1930s – Fredrick Cox commences Jolliff Pottery
- 1939 – Hatton Beck and Lucy Boyd open Altamira Pottery
- 1944 – Arthur Boyd, John Perceval and Peter Herbst establish Arthur Merric Boyd (AMB) Pottery at 500 Neerim Road
- 1972 – Shortening of railway siding at station used to deliver coal and goods.
- 1972 – Schwob's Swiss Bakery expand into manufacturing, moving to premises in Murrumbeena
- 6 December 1977 – Removal of railway siding at station.
- 1989 – Boyd Park established and officially opened by the Mayor of Caulfield, Veronica Martens. Caulfield Environment Group established by local residents to rehabilitate and plant flora in park.
- 1996 – Murrumbeena Secondary College closed
- 2006 – The second Commonwealth Nations Bridge Championship held in Murrumbeena
- 2010 – The Neerim Road level crossing identified by the RACV as one of the worst for traffic congestion in metropolitan Melbourne.
- 2016 – The Victorian government announce plans for grade separation works with an elevated rail project to run through Carnegie, Murrumbeena and Hughesdale, and the relocation of Hughesdale station to within Murrumbeena
- 2018 – New elevated station opens
- 2021 – Murrumbeena Village Precinct receives Heritage Overlay

== Murrumbeena Village ==
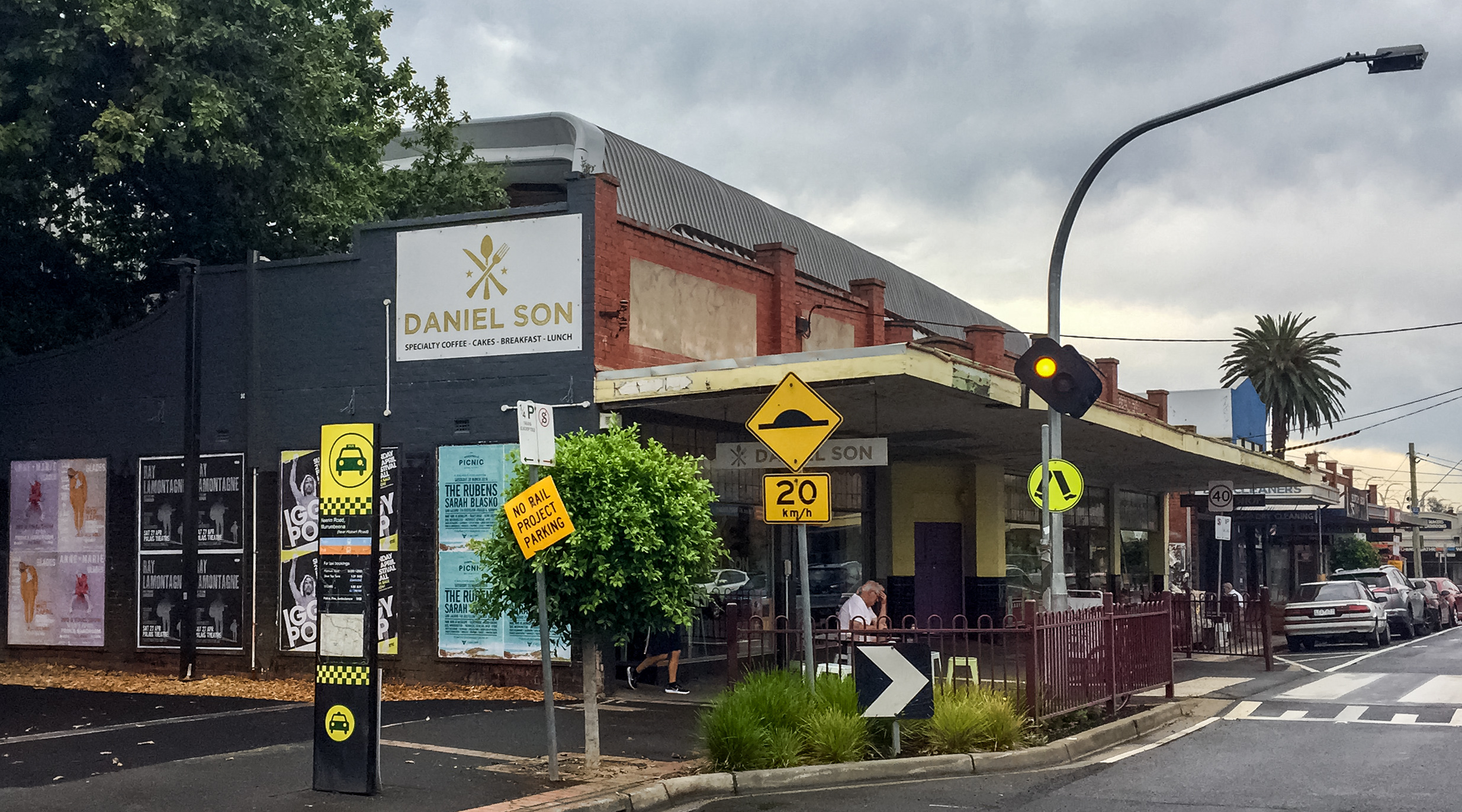
Murrumbeena Village main street (Neerim Rd)

Heritage protected Murrumbeena Village (1880s) sits on the main street of Neerim Road, the intersection of Murrumbeena Road and the railway station. The oldest building (430 Neerim Road) is a double storey Victorian era building dating from 1889. The village contains modern cafes and dining options (modern Australian, Chinese, fish and chips, Indian, pizza, Thai, Vietnamese); a wine bar; businesses including hairdressers/barbers, florist and curio/op shops; and services including a bank, post office, newsagent and pharmacy. Yoga and dance studios, and a martial arts centre also feature in this area.

Murrumbeena Village is currently undergoing a remodeling following major infrastructure upgrades during 2017–2019. Numerous street cafes, evening dining options and a wine bar have popped up alongside small businesses in fields which value the suburb's combined ease of access, walkability and village feel.

A creative market with local wares pops up fortnightly on Sundays (The Alleyway, Neerim Road) opposite the station. 'Local Sundays,' combines live music with barefoot bowls on the last Sunday of the month at the nearby Murrumbeena Bowls Club.

"Frogtopia," twin murals by local artist Anthony Breslin, feature in Attwood Lane between Neerim Road and the station.

== Transport ==
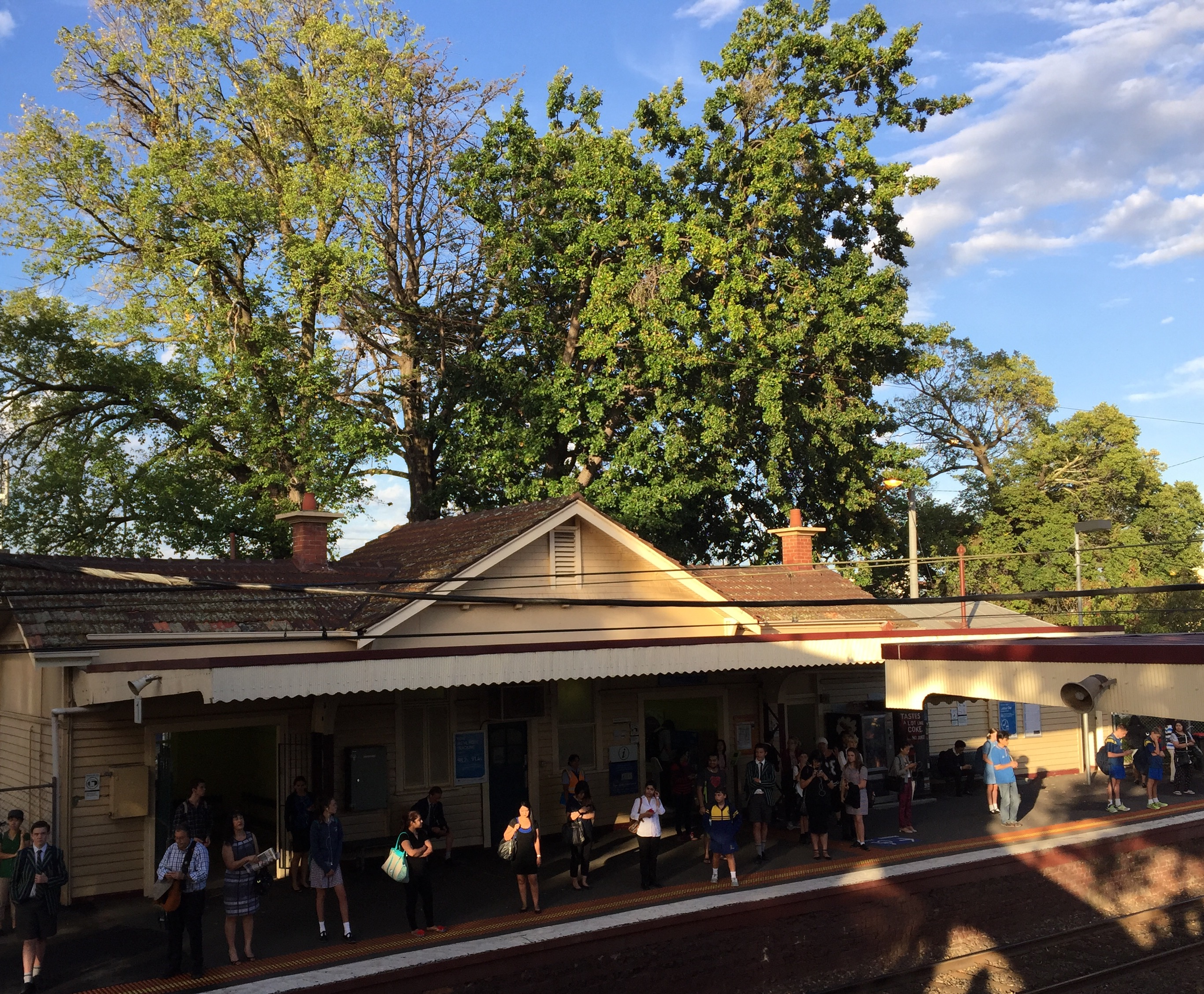
Original Murrumbeena station in 2016

Murrumbeena is a well-connected suburb with ease of access to public transport and main road arterials leading to freeways and CityLink.

The main roads delineating Murrumbeena are Dandenong Road, North Road, Murrumbeena Road and Poath Road, while Neerim Road traverses through it.

Murrumbeena railway station is a Zone 1 suburban railway station providing regular services to the city and along the Pakenham and Cranbourne lines. Most peak hour services run partially express, with only five stops between Murrumbeena and Melbourne's CBD. The popular service is well used through to late night. There are direct train connections to Monash University (Caulfield) and bus connections to Monash University (Clayton) and Holmesglen TAFE.

Upon completion of the Metro Tunnel in 2025, express city bound trains from Murrumbeena will be just 3/4 stops from Anzac (St Kilda Road)/Town Hall stations.

Murrumbeena Bus Interchange sits on Murrumbeena Road under the elevated railway station, with Bus Routes 624 and 822 traversing through it.

- Bus Route 623 stops at Dandenong Road service lane, on the northern boundary of Murrumbeena, en route from Chadstone SC to St Kilda.
- Bus Route 624 travels between Kew and Oakleigh via Malvern, Carnegie, Murrumbeena Bus Interchange, Chadstone SC and Holmesglen TAFE, and travels east and west along Neerim Road.
- Bus Route 625 travels between Elsternwick and Chadstone SC via Caulfield, Ormond, Carnegie and Oakleigh, stopping along Kangaroo Road (including Murrumbeena Park) in Murrumbeena.
- Bus Route 626 stops at Dandenong Road service lane, on the northern boundary of Murrumbeena, en route from Chadstone SC to Brighton.
- Bus Route 627 travels between Chadstone SC and Moorabbin Station via Dandenong Road service lane, predominantly stopping along Murrumbeena Road and East Boundary Road.
- Bus Route 630 travels between Elwood and Monash University (Clayton) along North Road via Ormond, Murrumbeena and Huntingdale, stopping on the southern boundary of Murrumbeena.
- Bus Route 822 travels between Chadstone SC and Sandringham via Murrumbeena Bus Interchange and Southland SC, predominantly stopping along Murrumbeena Road.
- Bus Route 900 travels Rowville (Stud Park SC) via Monash University (Clayton), Oakleigh, Chadstone SC to Caulfield/Monash University (Caulfield). It stops on Dandenong Road service lane, on the northern boundary of Murrumbeena, en route to Caulfield.

== Architecture and design ==
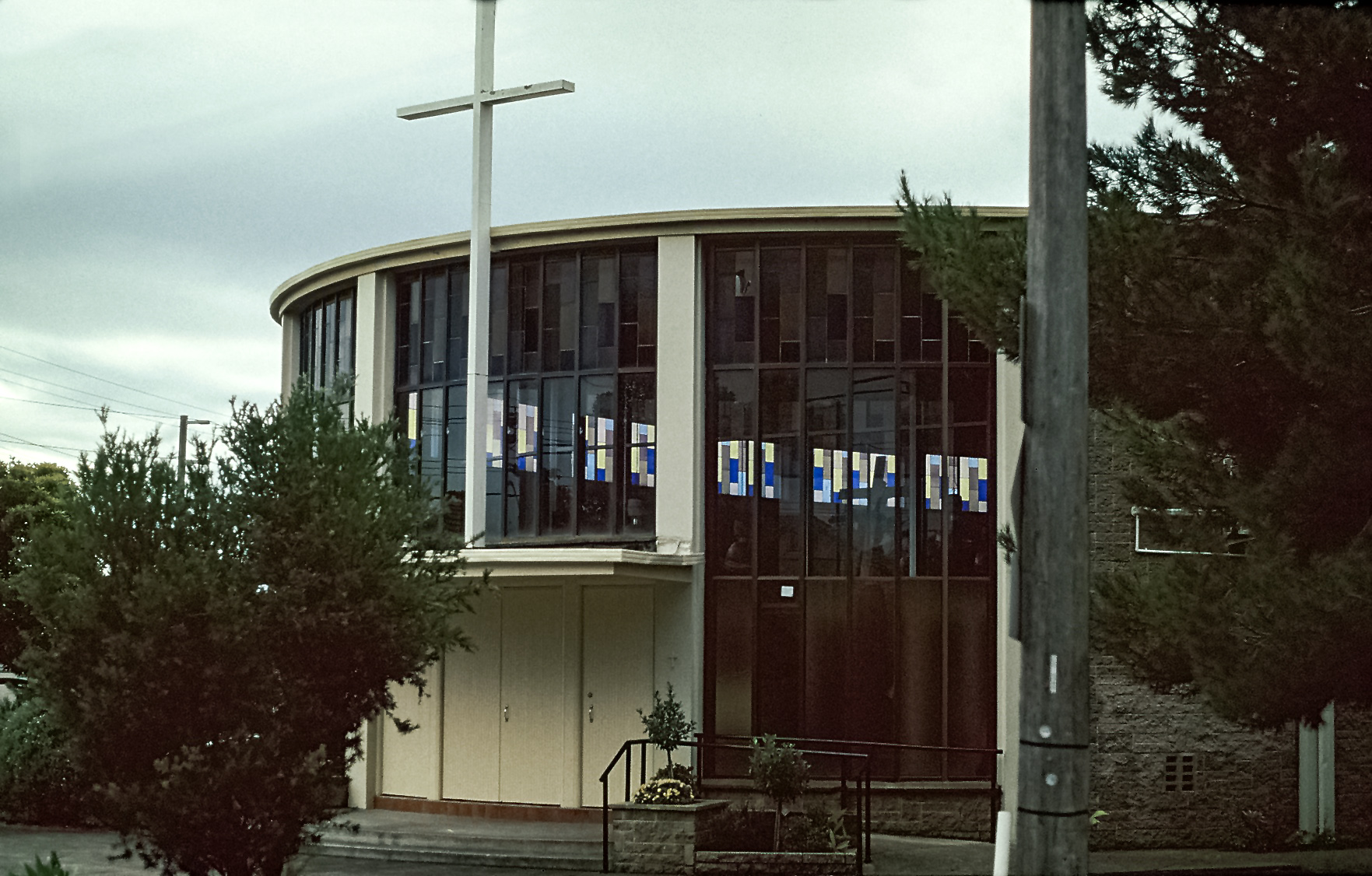
St Patricks Church Murrumbeena, a church made after the 2nd Vatican Council

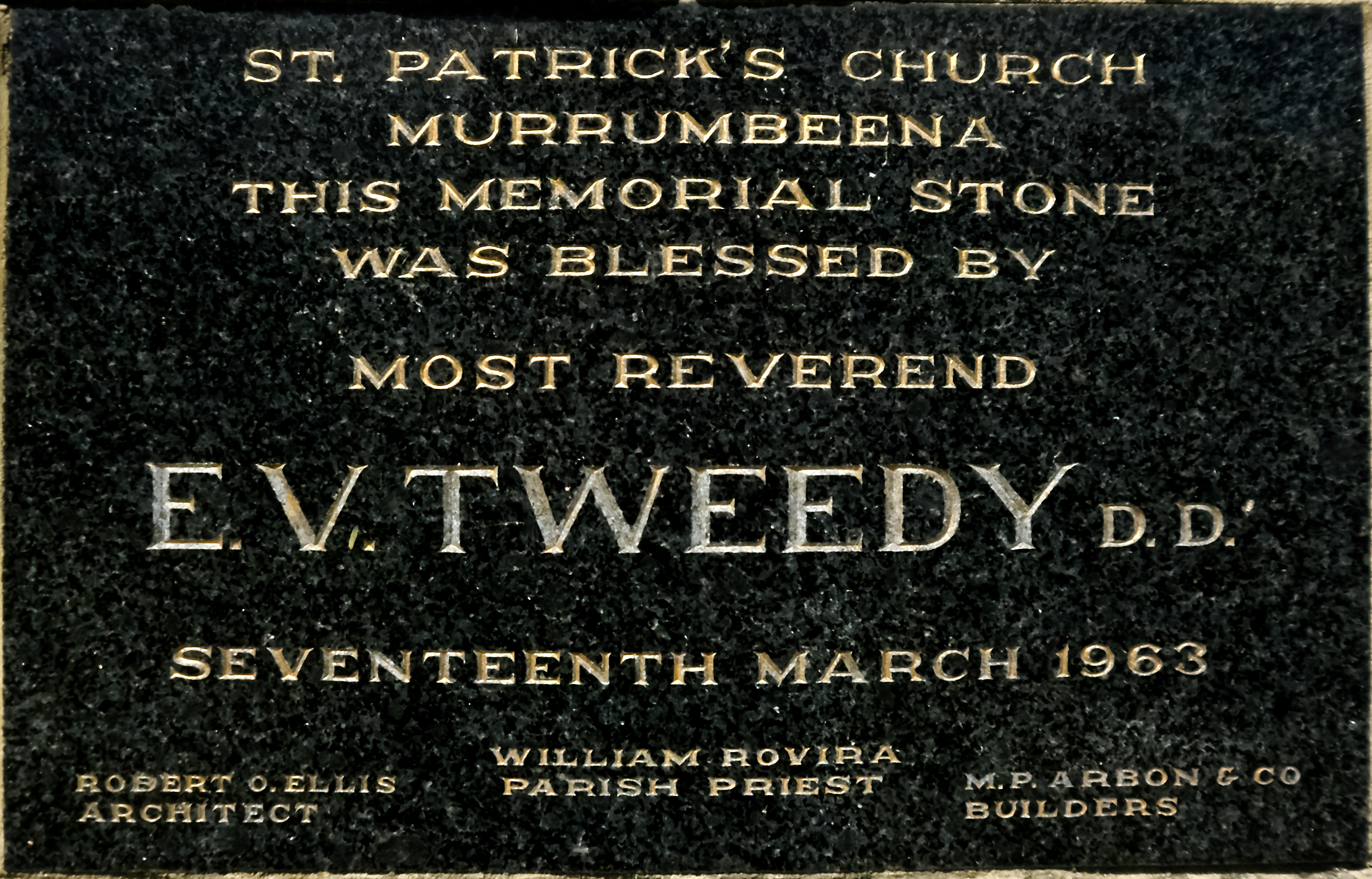
Plaque at St Patricks

Murrumbeena Village (c1880s) is heritage protected due to its brick and rendered building facades. This rejuvenating suburb, has seen a significant increase in urban density along the rail corridor and main arterials with single-level dwellings replaced by four to five-storey buildings. Outside of the main streets, Murrumbeena is a mix of predominantly single-family detached homes with small pockets of walk-up flats of up to two stories developed since the 1960s. The predominant style of the buildings in the shopping strip, station and surrounding homes are Federation and Interwar which include many magnificent examples of single story Art Deco designs.

The Victoria Heritage Database lists the following significant buildings in Murrumbeena:

- Murrumbeena Primary School in Hobart Road
- "Alnwick," 11 Railway Parade, is an early example of Queen Anne style and was built for Sir James Patterson, former Commissioner of Public Works, and Railways and Premier and Chief Secretary at the time
- ”Tralee", 4 Wahroonga Crescent, was built by painter Arthur Merric Boyd and Emma Minnie Boyd, and is a unique blend of California Bungalow and Victorian styles with ornate features
- "Urangara," 21 Omama Road
- "Croft Head" (built in 1887) at 13 Poath Rd - historically and aesthetically significant
- The Beauville Estate (built 1934–1936), built by Albert Victor Jennings, was the harbinger of planned community developments after WW1 and is listed under the National Trust due to its state heritage significance.
- The stained glass memorial windows of the Uniting Church (formerly St Giles Presbyterian) are listed in the Victorian War Memorial Register.
- Despite its listing in the Heritage Overlay, the original 1922 Murrumbeena Railway Station building (Arts and Crafts features), footbridge and associated gardens were demolished in 2017 to make way for the elevated rail project.

Other listed significant features include:

- Springthorpe Reserve Gates, in Neerim Road, is the last remnant of the Old Melbourne Hospital, founded in 1846-48 and important as the city's first public hospital.
- Andreas Svensson Pipe Organ (circa 1900–1910), in St Peter's Anglican Church at 371 Neerim Road, is the only identifiable example of the leading builder's work and retains its original pipework.
- Murrumbeena Baptist Church (1962), 44 Murrumbeena Road, ‘is aesthetically significant as an unusual example of post-WW2 ecclesiastical architecture incorporating historicist references in a modernist framework.’ Significant features of the stark post-WW2 modernist building, designed by architect Eric Lyon, include the tall hall-like structure with zigzag roof, narrow copper spirelets and a façade of angled bays to the Murrumbeena Road elevation, and rose windows with coloured glazing to the Sydney Street elevation. It was included in the City of Glen Eira Heritage Review 2020.

"Butterfly House," 38 Kangaroo Road, was designed as a template for modern sustainable design in established suburbs.

== Arts and culture ==
One of the most significant artistic groups in mid 20th-century Melbourne gathered at "Open Country", the Boyd family property in Murrumbeena. Outer Circle: The Boyds and the Murrumbeena Artists (NGV Australia 2014) presented the works created by Merric Boyd, Australia's first studio potter, Arthur Boyd, John Perceval and others at Open Country and the Arthur Merric Boyd (AMB) Pottery on Neerim Road.

In 1954–56, Arthur Boyd was commissioned to create the ceramic Olympic Pylon, known as Totem Pole, here for the Olympic Pool in Melbourne. The heritage-registered sculpture is now erected outside the Melbourne Sports and Entertainment Centre.

Colourful sculptures tower above the Murrumbeena Community Garden beds (planted with a variety of vegetables, sunflowers and Indigenous herbs) and painted furniture at Anthony Breslin's Community Art Project. The surrounding walls feature works of Breslin (including frogs) and other local artists, an extensive mural wall displays hundreds of tiles created by local primary school students, and a sustainable water garden feature sits alongside the shed. It is reached via the driveway of Murrumbeena Uniting Church, 117 Murrumbeena Road.

In 2021, Murrumbeena also became the home to a colourful 40-metre long mural on Railway Parade, The Story of Big Frog, based on Breslin's children's book, BREZANIA.

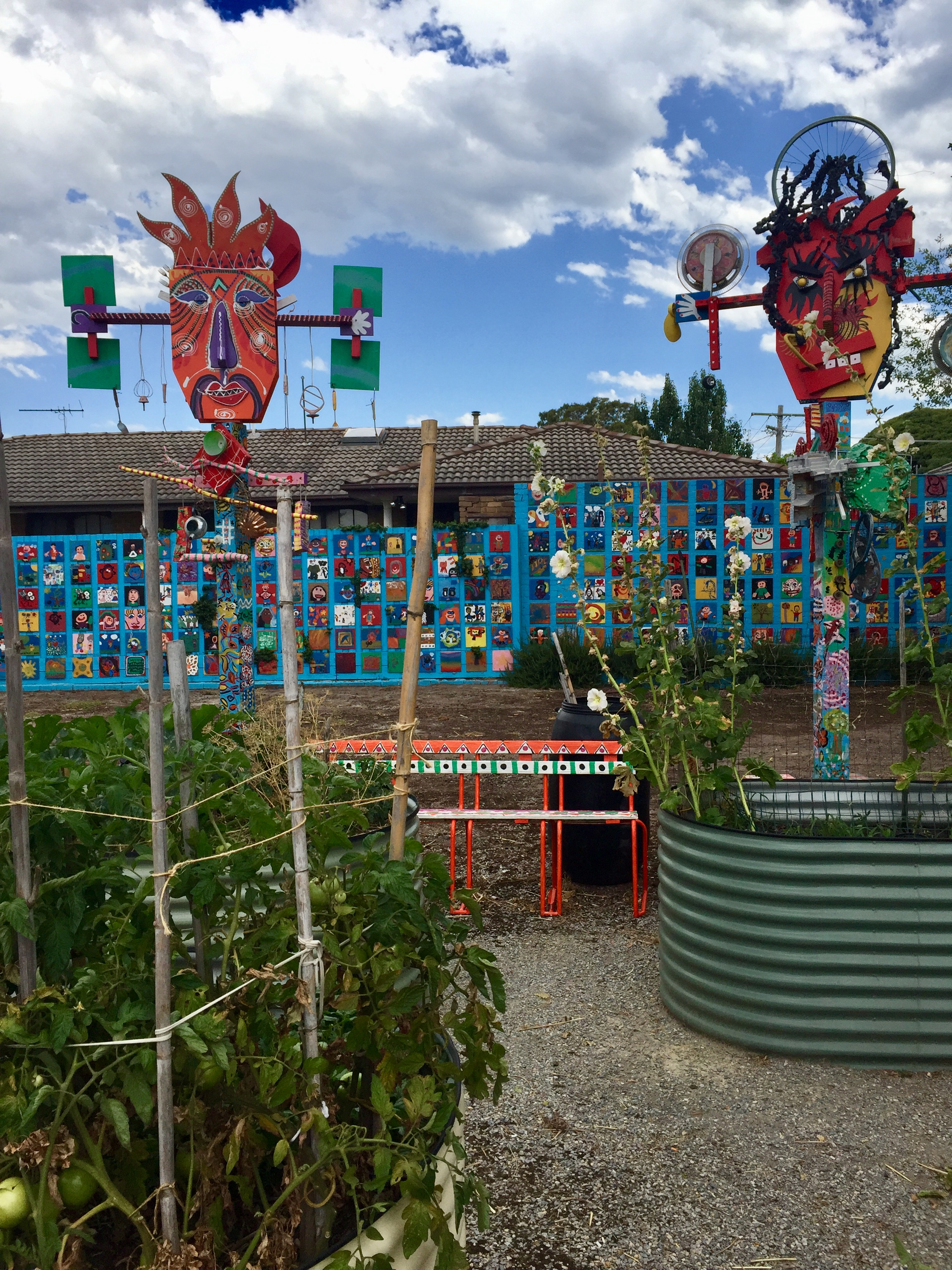
Anthony Breslin Community Art Project

== Education ==
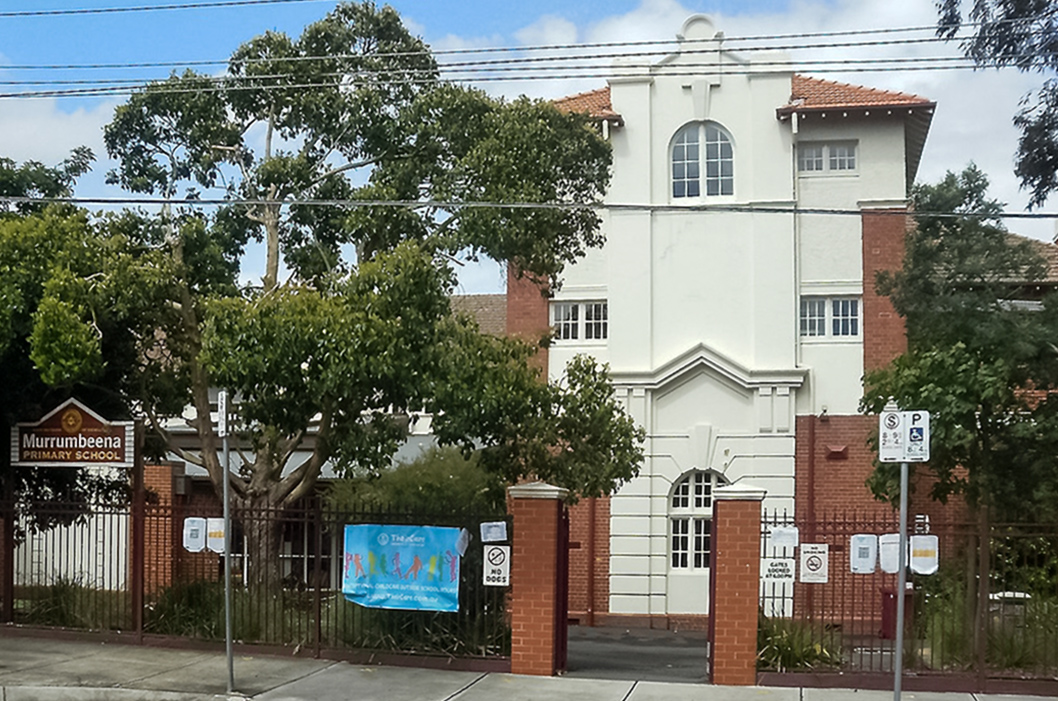
Murrumbeena Primary School

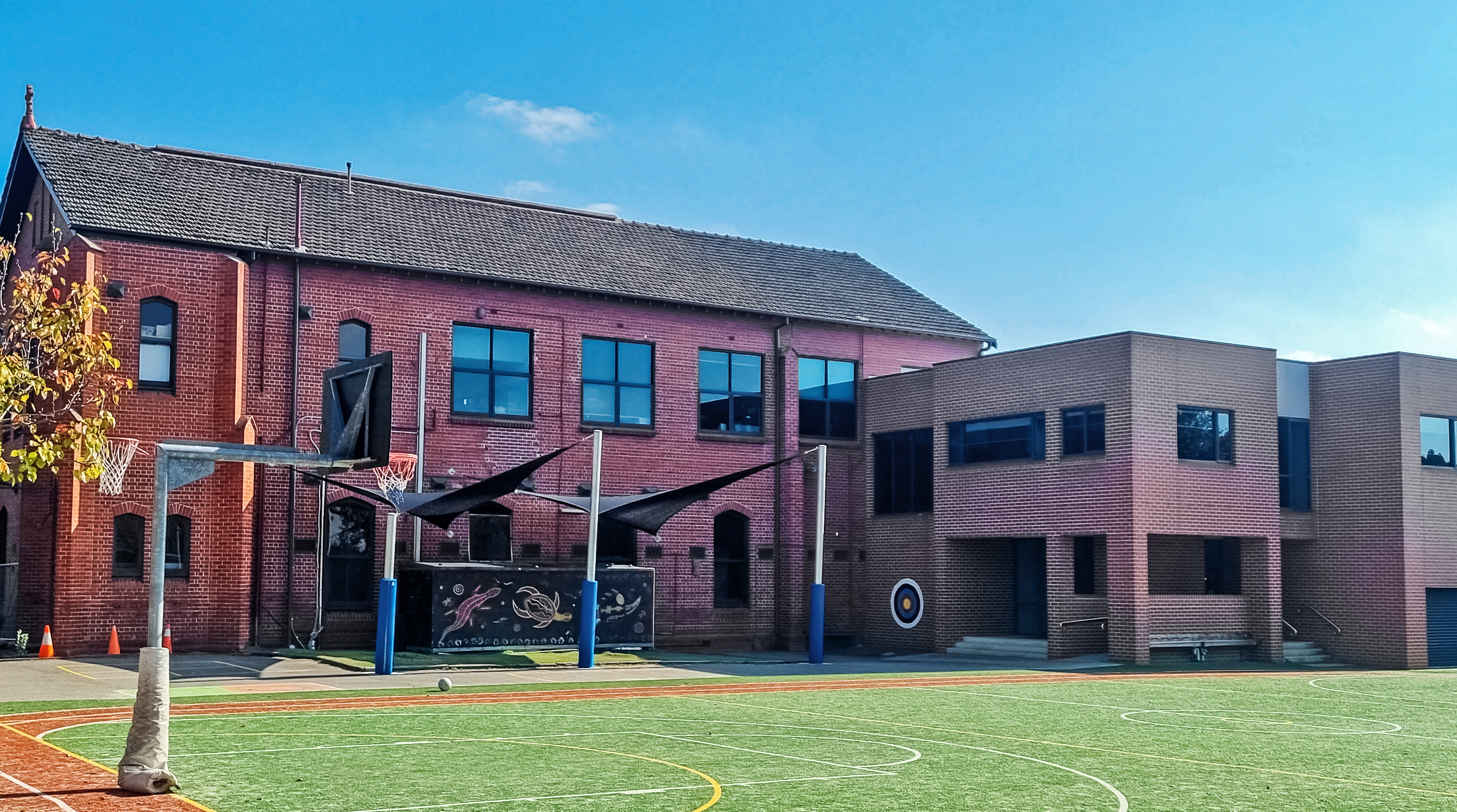
St Patricks Primary School 2024

Murrumbeena Primary School is an International Baccalaureate World School and Stephanie Alexander Kitchen Garden Program participant. The school building is on the Victorian Heritage Database due to its architectural significance. Six sculpture totem poles were created here in conjunction with ceramic artist-in-residence Ursula Dutkiewicz in 2008 Significant events in the school's history include:

- 1910 – Current site purchased
- 1917 – Current site occupied (opening with five teachers and 250 students)
- 1929 – School swimming pool built

St Patrick's Primary School is a Catholic school located next to the church of the same name.

Murrumbeena High School originally occupied a large parcel of land on the corner of Murrumbeena Road and North Road at 801 North Rd, Murrumbeena 3163, across the road from Duncan McKinnon Reserve. Significant events in its history include:

- 13 August 1974 – The school's art block was burnt down.
- 1990 – Renamed as Murrumbeena Secondary College.
- 1996 – Murrumbeena Secondary College was closed by the Kennett Government, part of a widespread closure of schools that led to a shortage of educational options within a few years. It 'merged' with Prahran High School (also closed) and Caulfield Secondary to form Glen Eira Secondary College. The site was sold to make way for a housing estate.

== Parks and recreation ==
Forming part of the Outer Circle Railway Linear Park, Boyd Park was named after the artistically talented Boyd family, and links with the Urban Forest at its northern end on Dandenong Road. The leafy park is surrounded by gum trees and has broad, open areas with a small playground and BBQ pavilion. "Open Country", a bronze sculpture by Lenore Boyd representing Merric Boyd's vision of life in early Murrumbeena, is mounted on a boulder nearby the park's Neerim Road entry. The southern end features majestic 250-year-old River Red Gum trees, a bordering post and rail fence, and some of the last remnant indigenous forest in the region, which includes endangered native orchids. Regular wildlife throughout Boyd Park includes brush tail and ringtail possums, 21 recorded native bird species (including owls and tawny frogmouth), geckos and microbats. The endangered Swift Parrot has been monitored foraging amongst the River Red Gums and winter-flowering golden wattle here and near Murrumbeena and Carnegie stations on its annual migration to Tasmania. The eastern koel, with its mournful nighttime cry, was recorded in Murrumbeena in 2022 and 2023.

At the end of the park is a mosaic pavement by artist Donna Leslie, reflecting the ecological harmony, balance and interdependence of the natural elements of our environment in a Koori design. The nearby Caulfield 9th (Murrumbeena) Scout Hall takes advantage of its park/bush environment and is the only group with an animal emblem (the frog) in the state.

The entry to Springthorpe Gardens features the original old gates of the Royal Melbourne Hospital (prior to 1860), which were presented to J. W. Springthorpe, who was a revered physician at the hospital and wrote many medical texts. The park was developed and named after him in 1934.

Murrumbeena Park on Kangaroo Road has an expansive discovery playground with dry riverbed, flying fox, climbing tower, maze, BBQ and picnic facilities. The two established ovals are predominantly used by the Murrumbeena Football Club and Cricket Club. Nearby is an off-leash dog-walking area. Murrumbeena Park Bowls Club is on the park's western boundary.

Duncan McKinnon Reserve, on the corner of Murrumbeena and North Roads, features an athletics facility, netball courts, sporting grounds and playground. The open access, 1.2 km fitness track around the perimeter includes an 'outdoor gym' with balance beam, bench, horizontal bar, jump touch, monkey bars, pull up bar, push up bar and step. Murrumbeena Relay for Life is held at the Duncan McKinnon Athletics Track annually to raise money for the Cancer Council.

Mallanbool Reserve, off Murrumbeena Road and Leila Road, is a cultural and botanical trail for visitors to learn about the original inhabitants of the area, the Kulin. Its trails connect to Packer Park.

=== Walking trails ===
The historical Boyd Walk commences in Murrumbeena Village opposite Murrumbeena Station and connects eight sites of historical significance. It tells the story of Murrumbeena's artistic heritage and local life of the Boyd family and associated artists who completed significant works in the area.

The Kulin Nation Trail through Mallanbool Reserve is an interpretive cultural and botanical trail telling the stories of the original Indigenous owners of the area.

The 17 km-long Djerring Trail, which runs under the elevated rail pylons, was completed in 2018. The leafy, shared pedestrian/bike path has exercise stations, and links Murrumbeena to Hughesdale (east) and Carnegie (west).

1000 Steps in Murrumbeena - Murrumbeena is reasonably flat apart from the dip between Murrumbeena and Hughesdale Stations. From the ground-level Murrumbeena Station to its platforms, there are 60 steps (4 flights of 15 stairs). A 1000-step challenge will require 16 full sections from bottom to top and a 17th to the end of the 3rd section. (Escalators and lifts don’t count.)

=== Cycling ===
Numerous cycling connections traverse Murrumbeena, including the 17 km-long Djerring Trail, which runs under and alongside the rail corridor from Caulfield to Dandenong.

A shared path through Boyd Park (along the Outer Circle Railway) connects to Gardiners Creek Trail on the other side of Dandenong Road then onto the Yarra Trail and Scotchmans Creek Trail. A bike repair station is alongside the path in Boyd Park.

Rosstown Rail Trail runs east–west along Murrumbeena Crescent.

The shared bike and parking lane along Murrumbeena Road runs north–south connecting to Dandenong Road and extending along East Boundary Road.

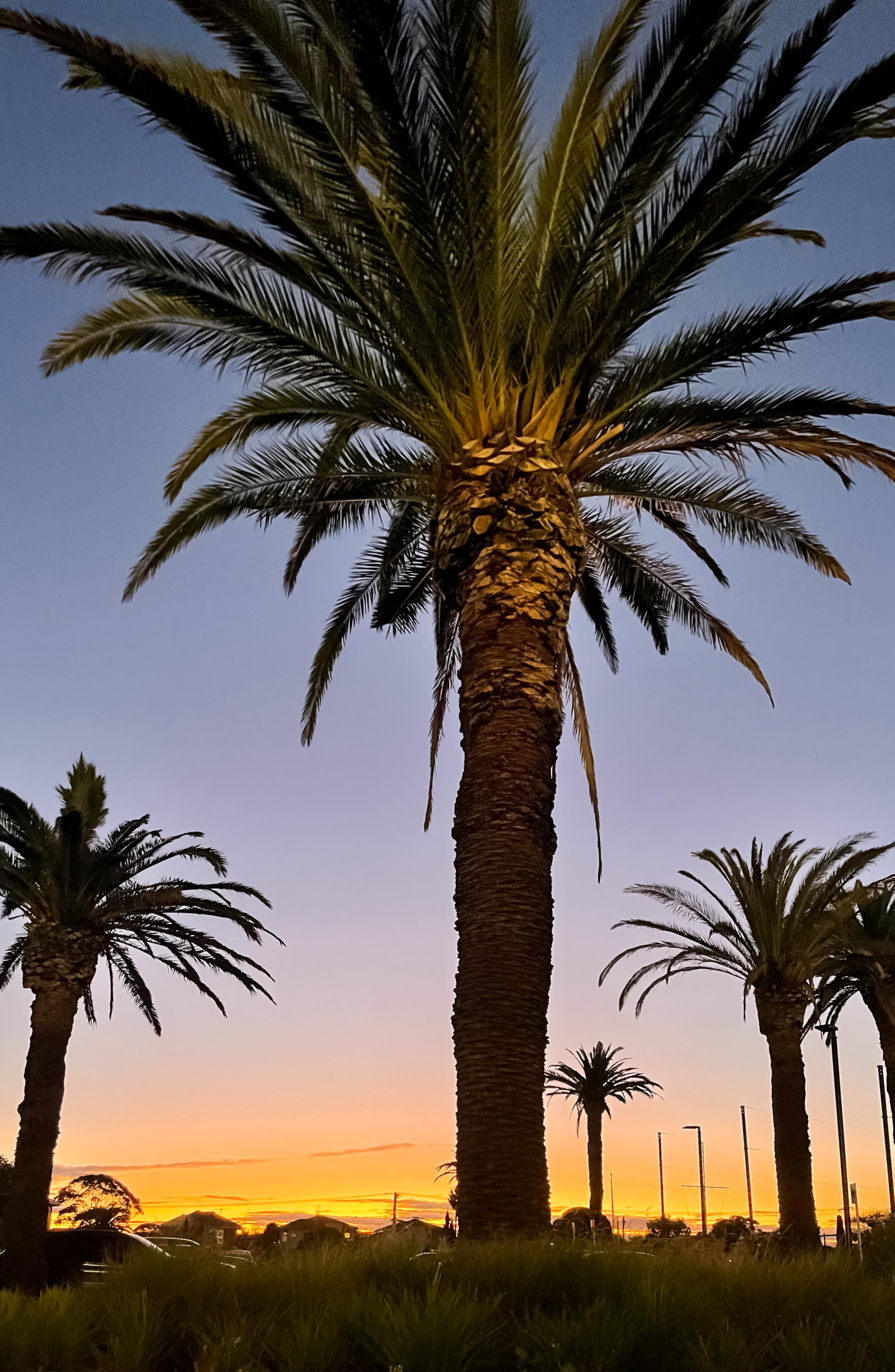
Palm trees at sunset, Murrumbeena Park

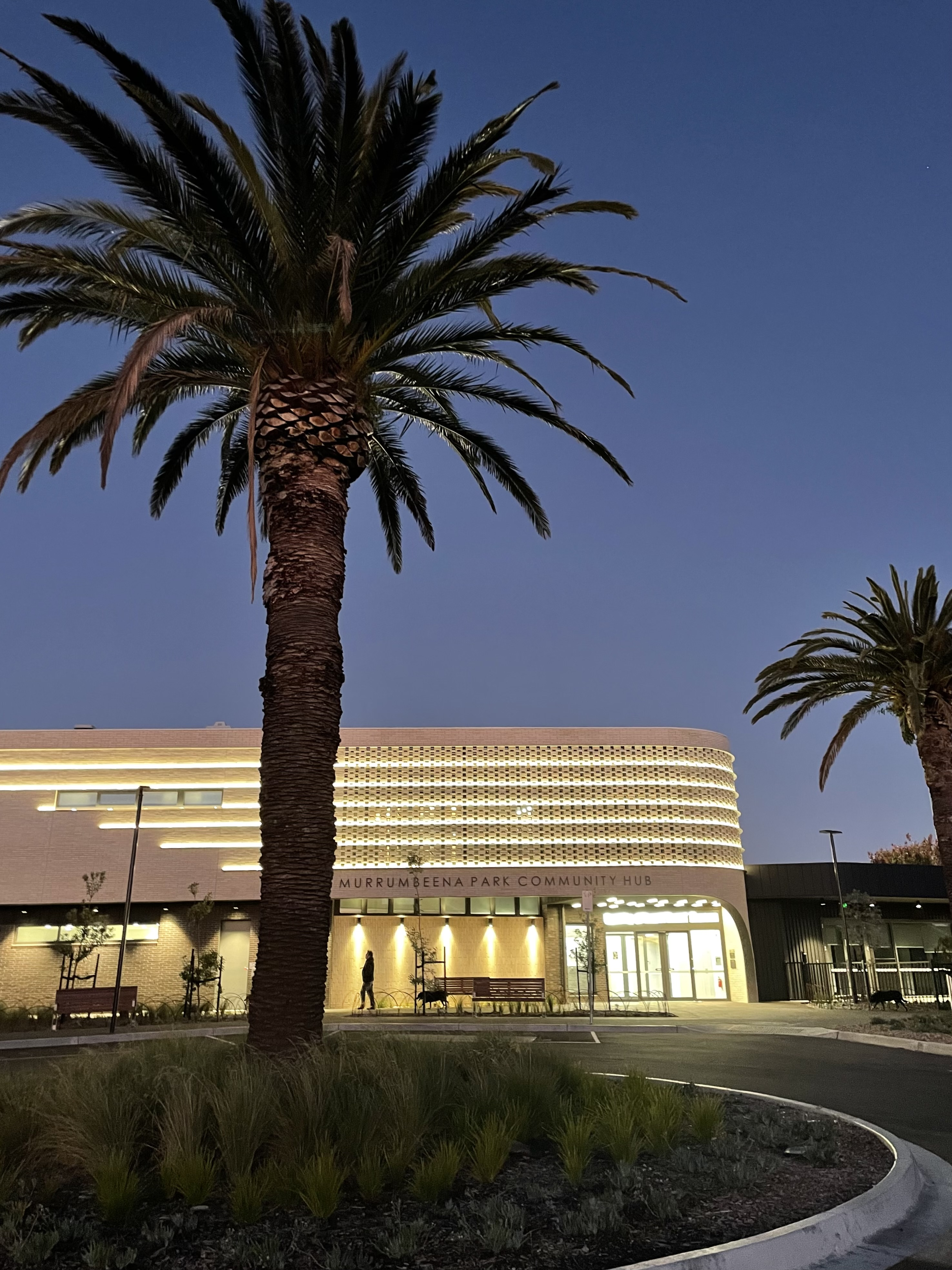
Murrumbeena Park pavilion

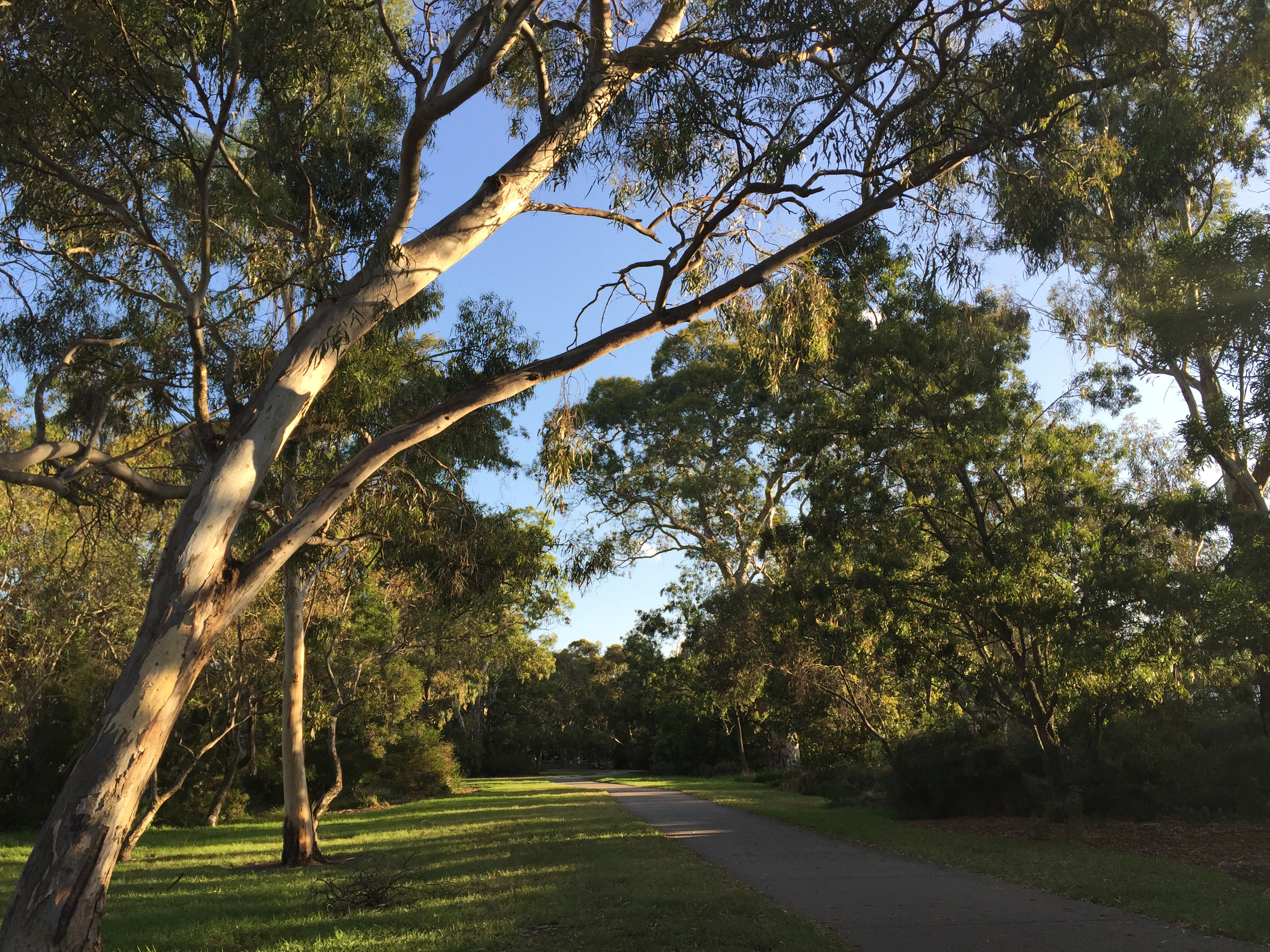
Outer Circle Railway linear park Murrumbeena

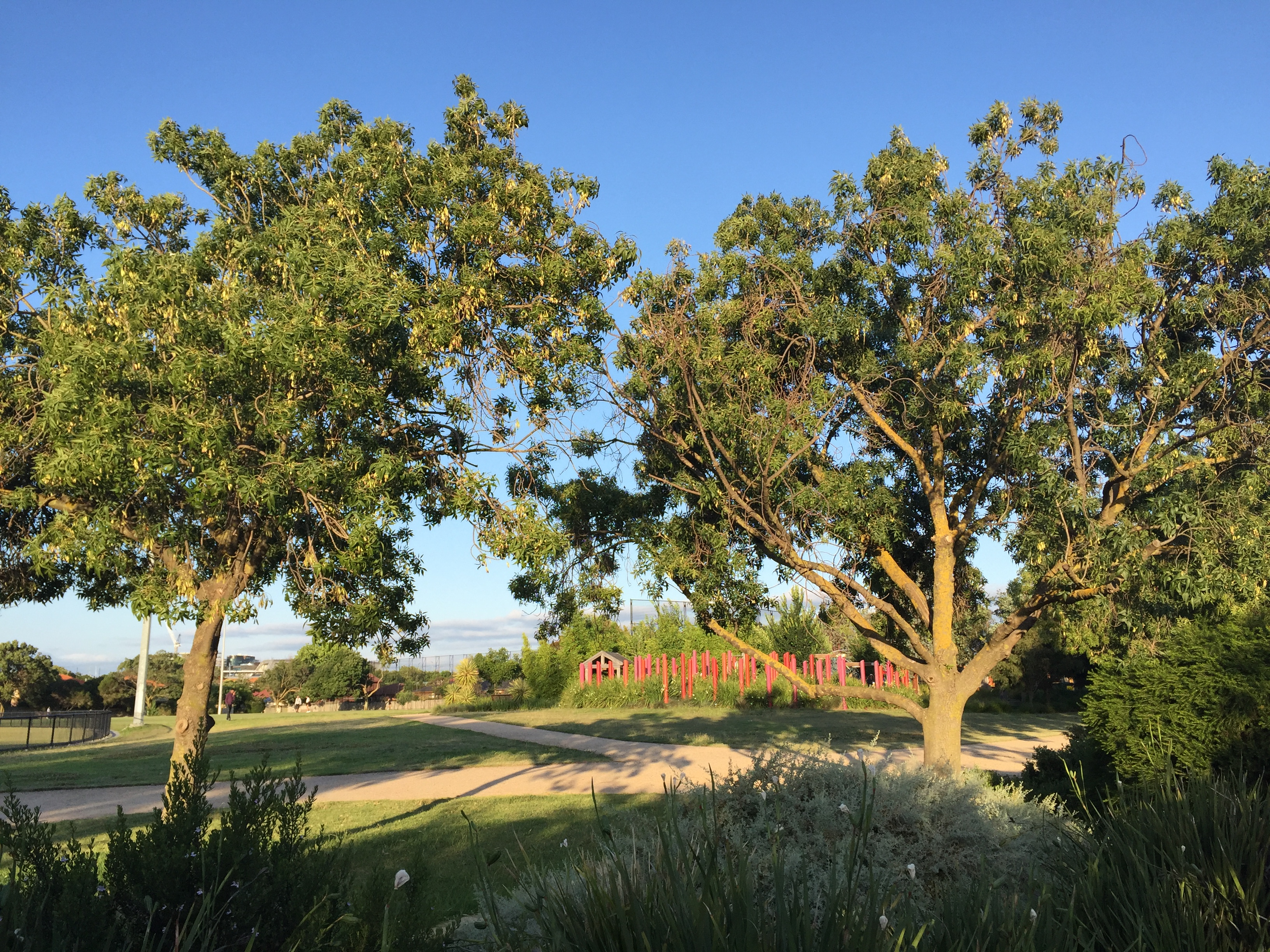
Murrumbeena Park playground and ovals

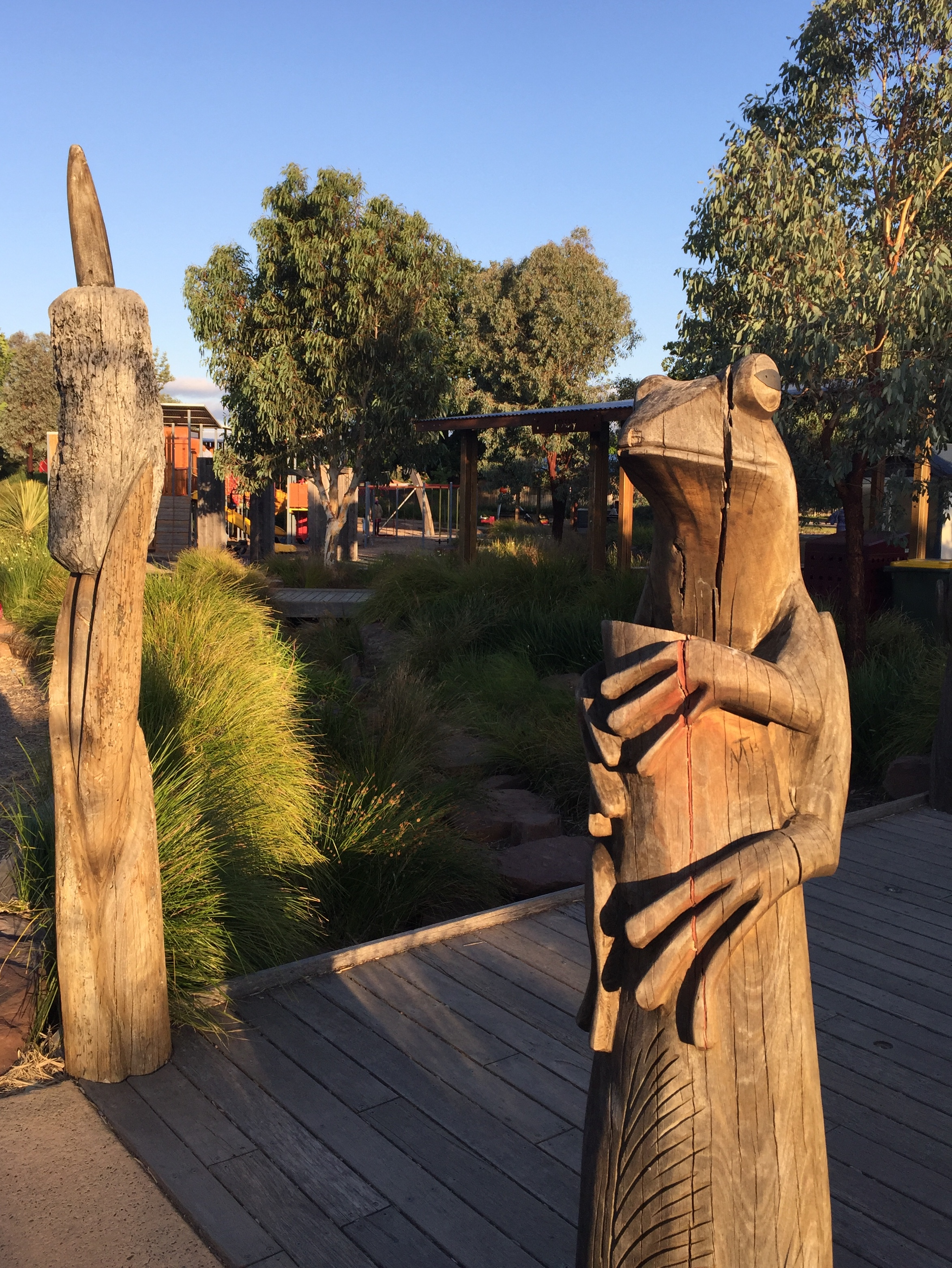
Murrumbeena Park playground

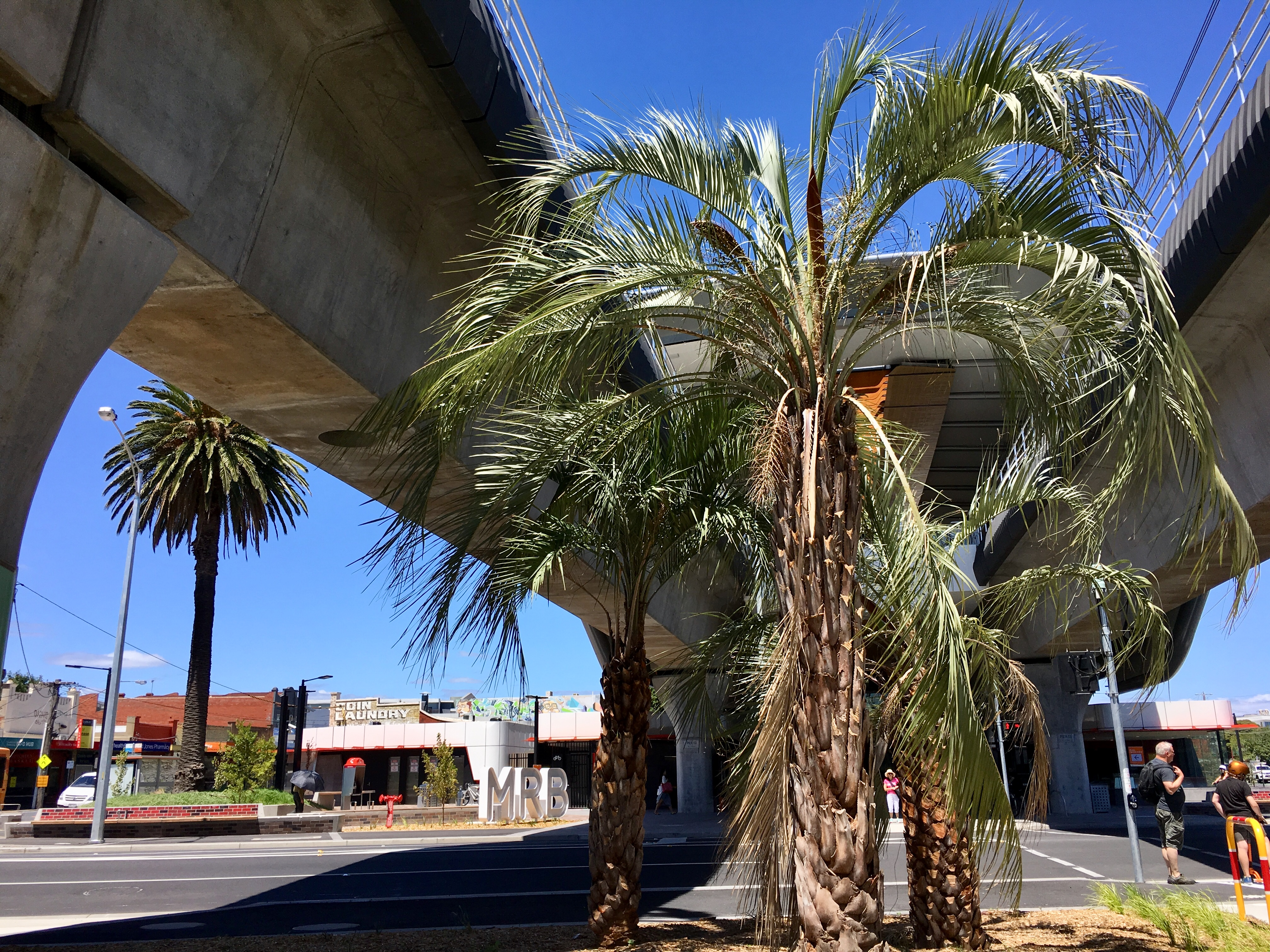
Looking toward Murrumbeena station from Djerring Trail

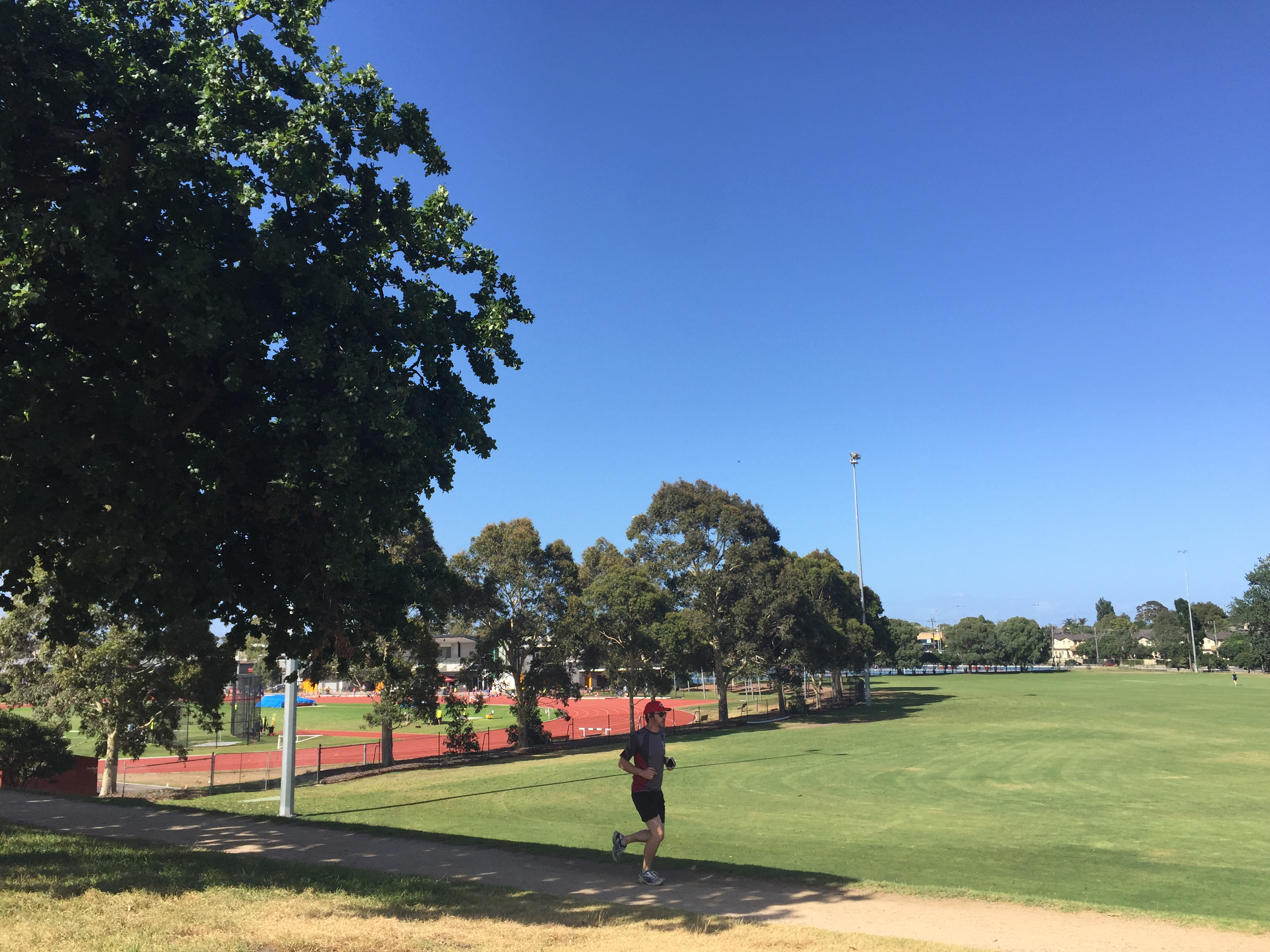
Duncan McKinnon Reserve

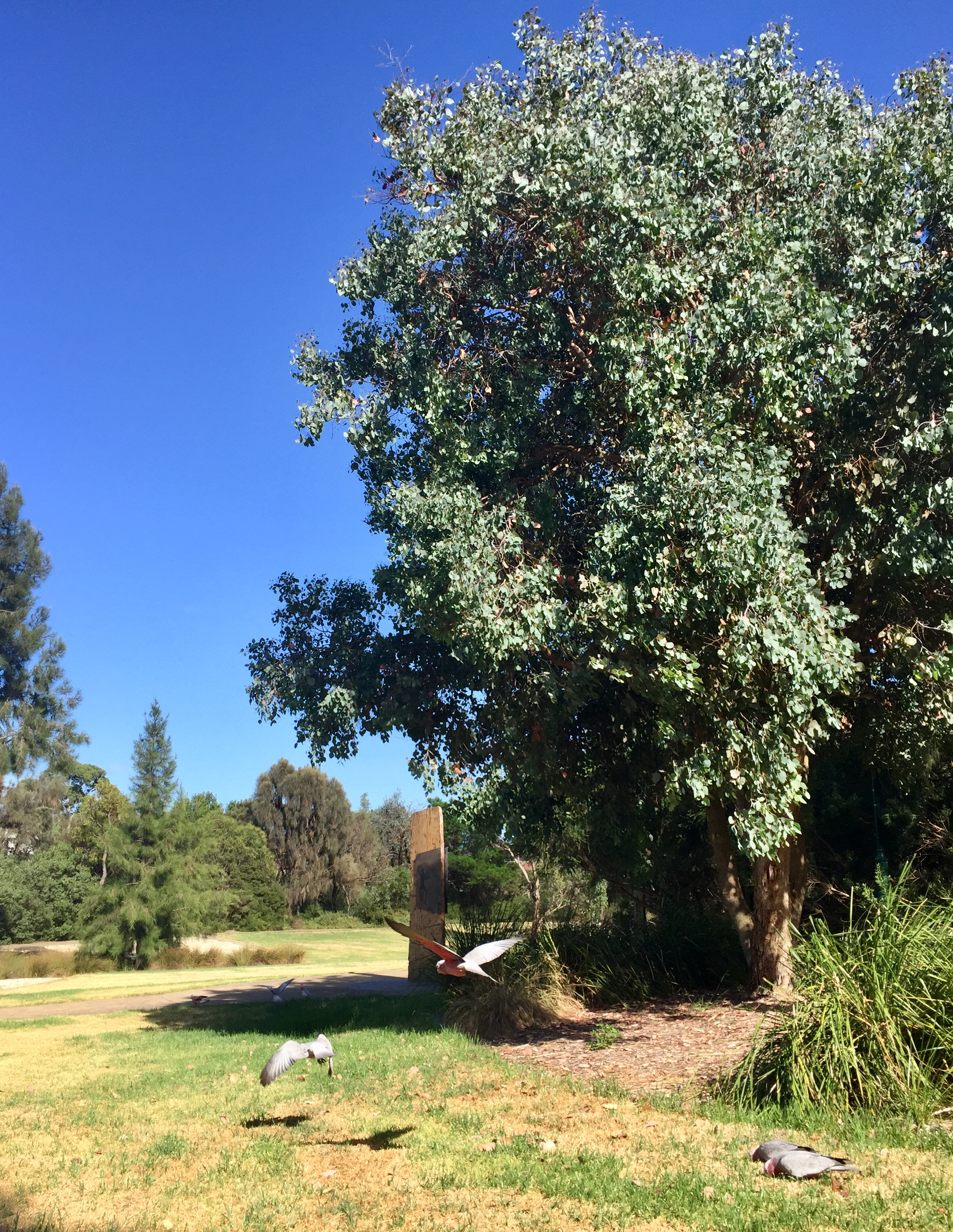
Mallanbool Reserve with galahs

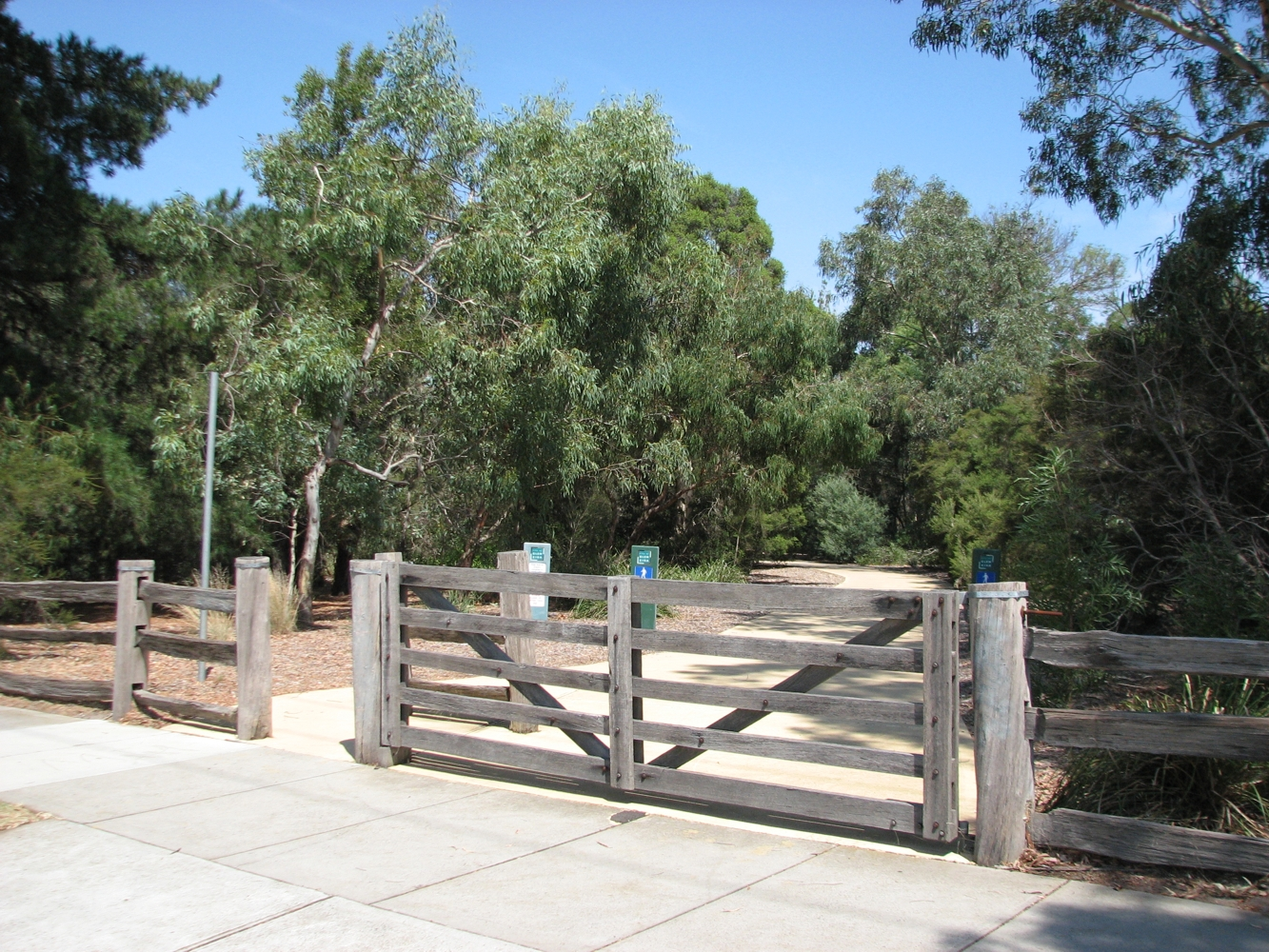
Entrance to Boyd Park which was named for the potter Merric Boyd

== Notable people ==
=== The arts ===
Through the Boyds, Murrumbeena played host to other well-known artists including John Perceval, Sidney Nolan, Hatton Beck, and Peter Herbst, Albert Tucker, Joy Hester, Yosl Bergner, Artur and Sylvia Halpern, Jean Langley and many others. Many pottery works produced in Murrumbeena are held in the National Gallery of Victoria's Australian Ceramics collection.

- Ppotter Merric Boyd (1888–1959) established a studio in Murrumbeena and produced his own distinctive style of Art Nouveau ceramics.
- Doris Boyd (née Gough (1889–1960) was a painter who studied under Bernard Hall and Frederick McCubbin at the National Gallery School, where she met husband Merric Boyd.
- Emma Minnie Boyd (1858–1936) was an experienced and prolific Australian artist and lived at 4 Wahroonga Crescent.
- Arthur Boyd (1920–1999) was one of the leading Australian painters of the late 20th Century. In 1995 he was awarded Australian of the Year and in 1999 Boyd's portrait and artwork were featured in the Australian Legends series postage stamps. One of the world's largest tapestries, a greatly enlarged version of Boyd's original painting, hangs in the Great Hall of the Australian Parliament House.
- Guy Boyd (1923–1988) was a figurative sculptor, potter and activist born and raised at Open Country. He authored Justice in Jeopardy in defence of Lindy Chamberlain, and was the subject of a book by Anne Von Burtouch and Patrick Hutchings.
- David Boyd (1924–2011) was a figurative painter, ceramic sculptor and potter, born and raised at "Open Country". He was married to Hermia Boyd and was a member of the Antipodeans group.
- Artist John Perceval (1923–2000) married Mary Boyd in 1944 and moved to Open Country, where they raised their four children. Between 1949 and 1955 he concentrated on producing earthenware ceramics and helped to establish the Arthur Merric Boyd Pottery.
- Lady Mary Elizabeth Nolan (née Boyd, also Mary Perceval, 1926–2016) was a photographer and featured in many paintings by Arthur Boyd, sculptures by Guy Boyd and the nativities of (first husband) John Perceval. She created a centre for communal art activities at The Rodd in Wales, along with husband Sidney Nolan.
- Frederick Cox (1861–1965), Murrumbeena artist and potter better known as Jolliff Influenced by the Boyd family, he is known for hand-formed pottery and his "wonderfully idiosyncratic body of work", which features in gallery collections.
- Elizabeth Fretwell (1920–2006) was an Australian soprano born and raised in Murrumbeena. She was the prima donna at London's Sadler's Wells Opera (English National Opera) through much of the 1950s and 1960s, sang before Queen Elizabeth II, joined the Australian Opera and performed at Sydney Opera House.
- John Béchervaise (11 May 1910 – 13 July 1998) was an Australian writer, photographer, artist, historian and Antarctic explorer who taught art at Murrumbeena State School.
- Jazz musician/trombonist Frank Traynor (1927–1985) opened the Melbourne Jazz Club, was once dubbed 'Australia's king of jazz,' and was born Murrumbeena.
- Mark Trevorrow, the creator of Bob Downe, the camp safari-suit wearing comic and singer was born and raised in Murrumbeena.
- Musician Nick Cave grew up in the suburb, following his early years in Warracknabeal. Local café Nature Boy, named after one of Cave's songs, is an homage to the former resident.
- TISM played their first show at the Duncan McKinnon Athletics Reserve's track club rooms on 6 December 1983.
- Singer-songwriter Vance Joy (born James Keogh) grew up in Murrumbeena.
- Suzanne Johnston, an operatic mezzo-soprano and ARIA Award winner, was born in Murrumbeena.
- Comedian, radio and TV broadcaster Libbi Gorr grew up in Murrumbeena. Her satirical character Elle McFeast emerged on ABC's Live and Sweaty (alongside Andrew Denton) in 1991.
- Radio and television presenter Ed Phillips lived in Murrumbeena.
- Eve Ash - writer, filmmaker and former director/board member of the AFI and Film Victoria - was raised in Murrumbeena. Her 2019 film Man on the Bus weaves the story of her parents' Holocaust experience and new life in the suburb.
- Brian Wise is a veteran 3RRR broadcaster and founder of Rhythms Magazine, recognised for four decades dedicated to broadcast media, particularly radio.

=== Sports ===
Many Australian Rules footballers played with Melbourne Demons and came from Murrumbeena Football Club and also grew up (or went to school) in the suburb, including Robert Flower from 1973 until 1987, Tom Flower, Ray Carr, Mark Mitchell, Howard Hollow and Ken Jungworth.

- Ellia Green is a professional Australian Rugby Union player who represented Australia in Sevens Rugby, won a gold medal at the 2016 Summer Olympics in Rio and is Australia's highest tryscorer in history. He lived in Murrumbeena while attending school.
- Wayne Walsh was recruited from Murrumbeena FC to play for Richmond (Tigers) in 1968, played for South Melbourne (Swans), then returned to the Tigers and played in the 1973/1974 Premiership teams.
- John Richmond was recruited from Murrumbeena FC to play for Richmond in the 1960s.
- Sydney Swans champion footballer Stephen Wright coached Murrumbeena Football Club from 2014 to 2018, making it to grand finals in 2015 and 2017 in the Southern Football Netball League.
- Australian Baseball League player Philip Dale coaches Australian national baseball (including Athens Olympics 2004 silver medal-winning Australian team) and resides in Murrumbeena.
- Paralympic swimming medallist Phillip Tracey was from the suburb.

=== Business and politics ===
- Sir James Patterson (18 November 1833 – 30 October 1895), was an Australian colonial politician and the 17th Premier of Victoria. He lived in Murrumbeena and was still a member of Parliament when he died from influenza.
- Bill Shorten, the Member for Maribyrnong in the Australian Parliament, grew up in Neerim Rd, Murrumbeena and attended Mass at the Good Shepherd Convent, on the current site of Chadstone Shopping Centre. He was the Leader of the Australian Labor Party and Leader of the Opposition in the Australian House of Representatives.
- Entrepreneur, owner of Australia's National Basketball League (NBL) and co-founder of internet provider Dodo, Larry Kestelman attended Murrumbeena High School.
- Gangster “Squizzy" Taylor (Joseph Theodore Leslie Taylor; 1888–1927) holed up in Emily Street for a year.

== Sport ==
The suburb has an Australian Rules football team competing in the Southern Football League with a history that can be traced back to the formation of the Murrumbeena Junior Football Club in 1918. They have junior and senior sides, including women's teams. Murrumbeena won back-to-back SFNL Women's Division 1 Premierships in 2017, 2018 and 2019.

Murrumbeena Bowls Club and Murrumbeena Park Bowls Club field teams in the Bowls Victoria Pennant competition.

Sporting clubs:

- Murrumbeena Football Club – Founded in 1918.
- Murrumbeena Cricket Club – Founded in 1910.
- Murrumbeena Bowls Club (Blackwood St) - Founded in 1923 initially at 'Oakdene' 41 Murrumbeena Rd and moved to current site in 1925.
- Murrumbeena Park Bowls Club (Gerald St)
- Glenhuntly Athletics Club, Duncan McKinnon Reserve
- Caulfield Little Athletics, Duncan McKinnon Reserve
- Murrumbeena Netball Club (MNC)
- Caulfield and District Netball Association, Duncan McKinnon Reserve
- Murrumbeena Tennis Club
- Caulfield Recreational Tennis Club, opposite Duncan McKinnon Reserve

== See also ==
- City of Caulfield – Murrumbeena was previously within this former local government area.
