= Arthur Boyd =

Australian Painter (1920–1999)

Arthur Boyd AC OBE
- Arthur Boyd
- Born: Arthur Merric Bloomfield Boyd; 24 July 1920; Murrumbeena, Victoria, Australia
- Died: 24 April 1999 (aged 78); Melbourne, Victoria, Australia
- Burial place: Brighton General Cemetery
- Known for: Visual arts, philanthropy
- Works: Bride and Nebuchadnezzar series
- Movement: Antipodeans
- Spouse: Yvonne Boyd (née Lennie)
- Children: Jamie Boyd, Polly Boyd, Lucy Boyd
- Parents: Merric Boyd (father); Doris Boyd (mother)
- Relatives: Arthur Merric Boyd, Emma Minnie Boyd (grandparents); Lucy de Guzman Boyd, David Boyd, Guy Boyd, Mary Elizabeth Boyd (siblings)
- Awards: Australian of the Year (1995)

Arthur Merric Bloomfield Boyd AC OBE (24 July 1920 – 24 April 1999) was a leading Australian painter of the middle to late 20th century. Boyd's work ranges from impressionist renderings of Australian landscape to starkly expressionist figuration, and many canvases feature both. Several famous works set Biblical stories against the Australian landscape, such as The Expulsion (1947–48), now at the Art Gallery of New South Wales. Having a strong social conscience, Boyd's work deals with humanitarian issues and universal themes of love, loss and shame.

Boyd was a member of the Antipodeans, a group of Melbourne painters that also included Clifton Pugh, David Boyd, John Brack, Robert Dickerson, John Perceval and Charles Blackman.

The Boyd family line of successive and connective artists includes painters, sculptors, architects and other arts professionals, commencing with Boyd's grandmother Emma Minnie Boyd and her husband Arthur Merric Boyd, Boyd's father Merric and mother Doris; 'She was the backbone of the family' recalls Boyd "without her, the entire family would have fallen apart", uncle Penleigh Boyd (and his son, Arthur's cousin, Robin), uncle Martin Boyd, and siblings Guy, David and Lucy. His other sister Mary Boyd, married first John Perceval, and then later Sidney Nolan, both artists. Boyd's wife, Yvonne Boyd (née Lennie) was also a painter; as are their children Jamie, Polly, and Lucy.

In 1993, Arthur and Yvonne Boyd gave family properties comprising 1,100 hectares (2,700 acres) at Bundanon on the Shoalhaven River to the people of Australia. Held in trust, Boyd later donated further property, artwork, and the copyright to all of his work.

== Early years and background ==
Boyd was born at Murrumbeena, Victoria, the son of Doris Boyd and her husband Merric, both potters and painters. Boyd's sisters Lucy and Mary were both artists as well as both of Boyd's younger brothers; David was a painter, and Guy a sculptor. After leaving school aged 14 years, Boyd briefly attended night classes at the National Gallery School in Melbourne where Jewish immigrant artist Yosl Bergner introduced Boyd to writers such as Dostoyevsky and Kafka and influenced his humanitarian values and social conscience. Boyd later spent some time living on the Mornington Peninsula at Rosebud with his grandfather, the landscape painter Arthur Merric Boyd, a primary guide to the formation of his talent. Early paintings were portraits and of seascapes of Port Phillip created while he was an adolescent, living in the suburbs of Melbourne. He moved to the inner city where he was influenced by his contact with European refugees. Reflecting this move in the late 1930s, his work moved into a distinct period of depictions of fanciful characters in urban settings.

== Career ==
=== Military service ===
Boyd (Service number V101720) was 20 when conscripted to serve in the militia from 12 May 1941 until 25 March 1944. Initially serving with the 2nd Cavalry Division, which later became the 2nd Armoured Division (Australia), Boyd was transferred to the 4th Division (Australia) for full time service, and then Army Headquarters Cartography Company. Boyd predominantly served in the Bendigo area as a cartographer. Boyd's expressionistic wartime paintings included images of disabled people and those considered unfit to serve. These works have been described as depicting "the dispossessed and the outcast".

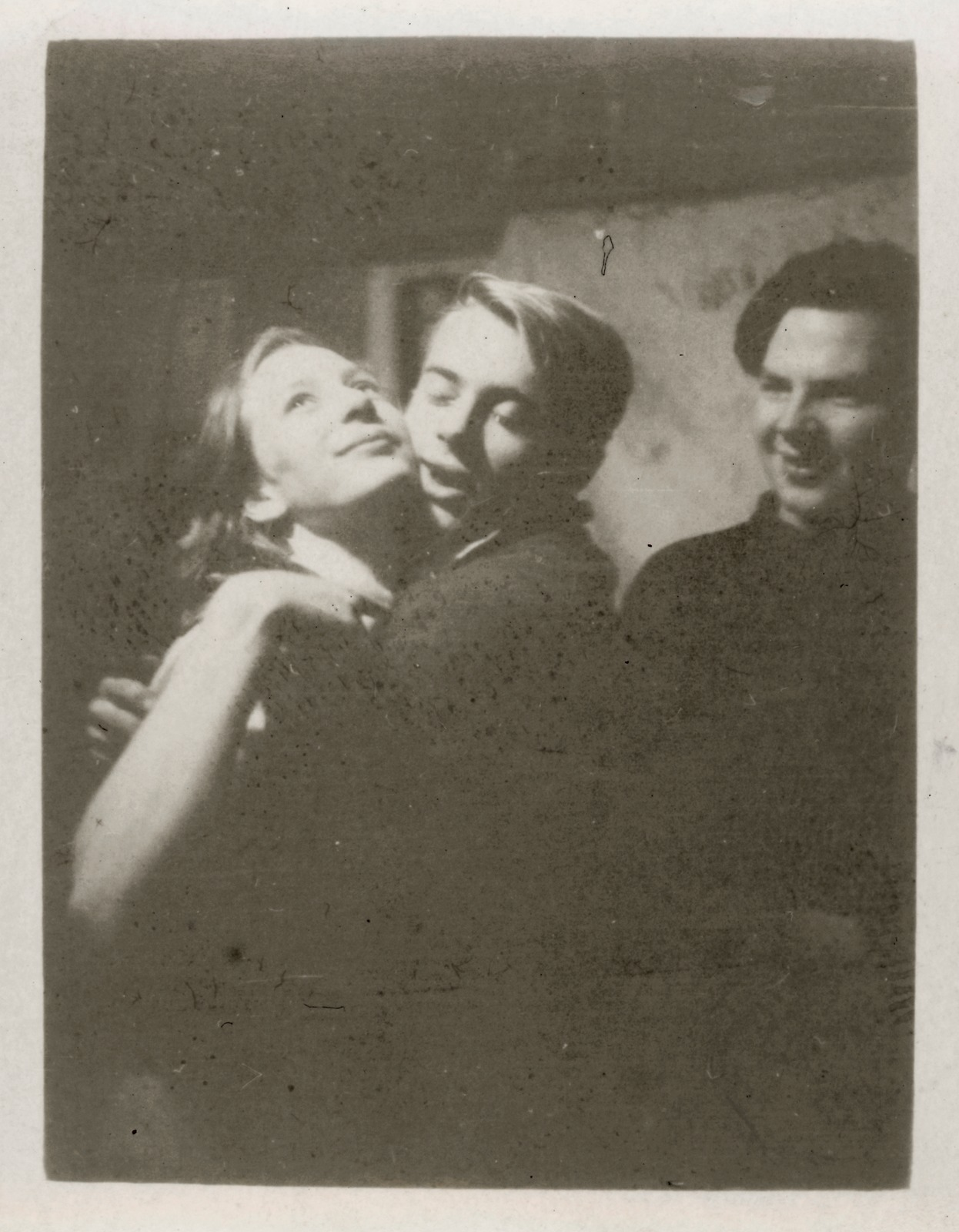
Boyd (right) in his studio in 1943 with his sister Mary and John Perceval

=== Artistic career ===
Following the war, Boyd, together with John Perceval founded a workshop at Murrumbeena and turned to pottery, a medium he associated with his father. Later came ceramic painting and sculpture. Although Boyd was close friends with Albert Tucker, Joy Hester and Sidney Nolan and the art patrons John and Sunday Reed, the modernist Heide Circle and its hierarchical structure did not beckon him overtly as his position in the Boyd family gave him the fullest identity in itself.

In the late 1940s and early 1950s, Boyd traveled to Victoria's Wimmera country and to Central Australia including Alice Springs and his work turned towards landscape paintings. During this period, perhaps his best-known work comes from his Love, Marriage and Death of a Half-Caste Bride series of 31 paintings, also known as The Bride, that imagined an Aboriginal person of mixed descent as a neglected outsider. First exhibited in Melbourne in April 1958, the series met a mixed reaction, as it did later that year in Adelaide and Sydney. Following the 1999 acquisition of Reflected Bride 1 by the National Gallery of Australia, the gallery's director Brian Kennedy commented in 2002:

The Bride paintings are among the greatest expressions of conscience by an Australian artist. Brilliantly executed and of sustained quality, Reflected Bride 1 speaks to contemporary Australia, beseeching reconciliation, understanding and a tolerant, compassionate meeting of old and new cultures.

Boyd’s paintings are not pretty, however, and carry a pervasive magical and somewhat menacing atmosphere. It is as if the figures and the landscape are one. The bride rises from the stream, an Ophelia caught by a groom whose foot hooks a tree. The bride is staring at an absurd mask-like white bride’s head which appears to glow out of the forest. This is a surreal wilderness, a strange place of nightmarish dreams.

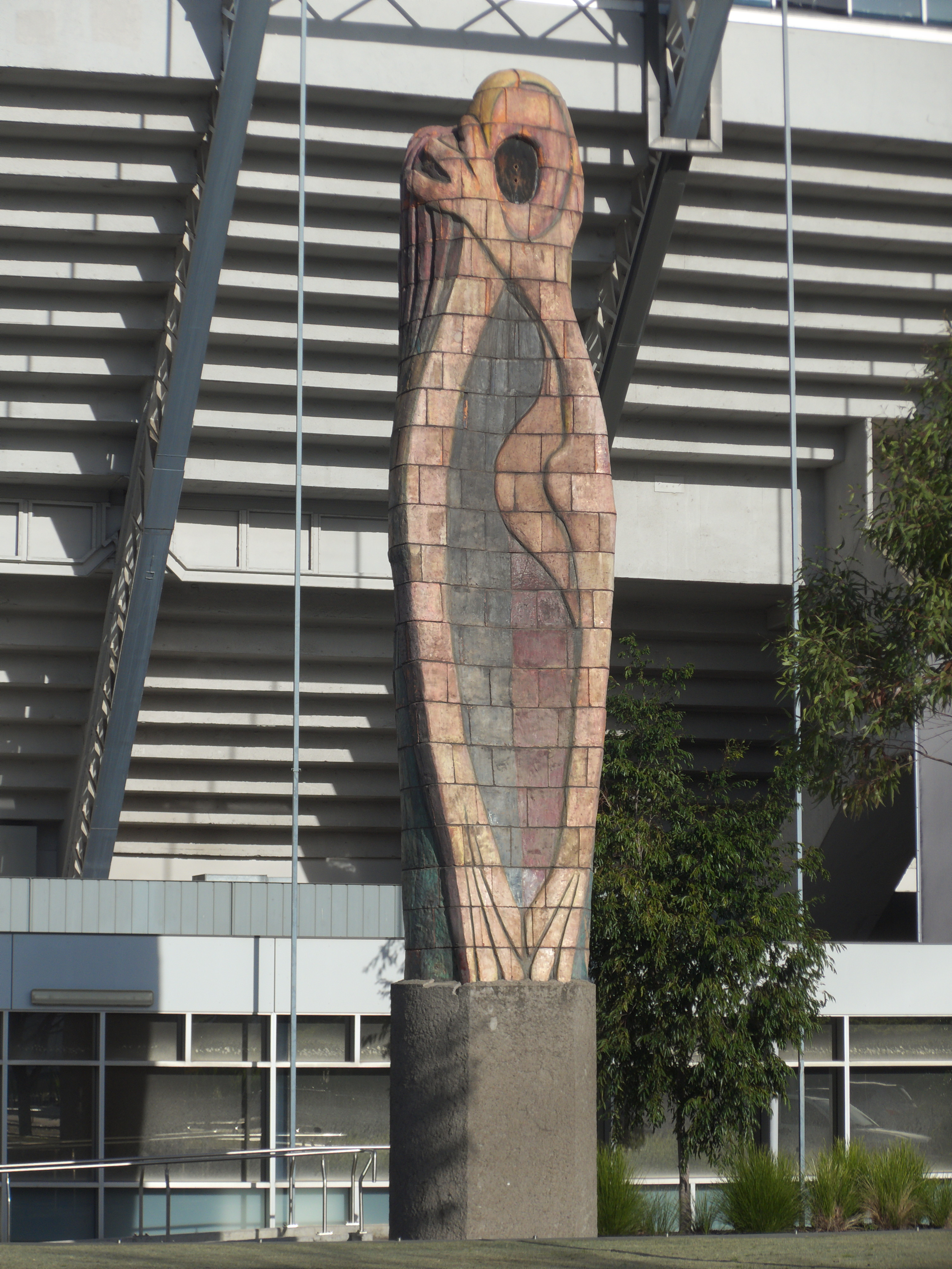
Olympic Pylon (1956)

In 1956, Boyd's ceramic sculpture 'Olympic Pylon' was installed in the forecourt of the Melbourne Olympic Swimming Pool.

=== Relocates to Europe ===
Boyd represented Australia with Arthur Streeton at the Venice Biennale in 1958, where his Bride series was well received.

He was affiliated with the Antipodeans, a group of painters founded in 1959 and supported by Australian art historian Bernard Smith, who tried to promote figurative art when abstract painting and sculpture was dominant. The group exhibited at the Whitechapel gallery in London. In 1959 Boyd and his family moved to London, where he remained until 1971. In London, he started receiving commissions for ballet and opera set designs, and, after taking up etching and returning to ceramic painting, in 1966 he began the Nebuchadnezzar series in response to the Vietnam War as a statement of the human condition. While in London, Boyd entered another distinct period with his works themed around the idea of metamorphosis.

He produced several series of works, including a collection of fifteen biblical paintings based on the teaching of his mother, Doris. Later he produced a tempera series about large areas of sky and land, called the Wimmera series.

=== Return to Australia ===
The recipient of a Creative Arts Fellowship from the Australian National University, in 1971 Boyd and his family returned to Australia as one of Australia's most highly regarded artists. In 1975, Boyd donated several thousand works including pastels, sculptures, ceramics, etchings, tapestries, paintings and drawings to the National Gallery of Australia.

In 1978, Arthur and Yvonne Boyd purchased properties and settled permanently at Bundanon on the Shoalhaven River. The following year, ABC TV and BBC TV co-produced the television documentary film, A Man of Two Worlds, based on Boyd's life and work. During the latter part of Boyd's painting career, his landscape works were based on the Shoalhaven River. At first encounter, Boyd was a little overwhelmed to paint the area; he found the scenery rugged and wild, vastly different from the landscapes he knew. But over the years, painting scenes of the Shoalhaven River and the surrounding bushland, he befriended the formidable landscape. This resulted in a significant series of paintings that are not simply landscapes but rather, a fusion of Boyd's European and Australian backgrounds.

"His Australian scapegoat paintings of the 1980s explored constructions of Australian identity in the lead up to the bicentenary of the arrival of the First Fleet in 1988. With their violent imagery and aggressive colouring they draw on archetypes of Australian military history to suggest the futility of war. In addition to painting, Boyd worked prolifically in ceramics, designed sets for the theatre, and provided illustrations for the poems of Australian poet Peter Porter."

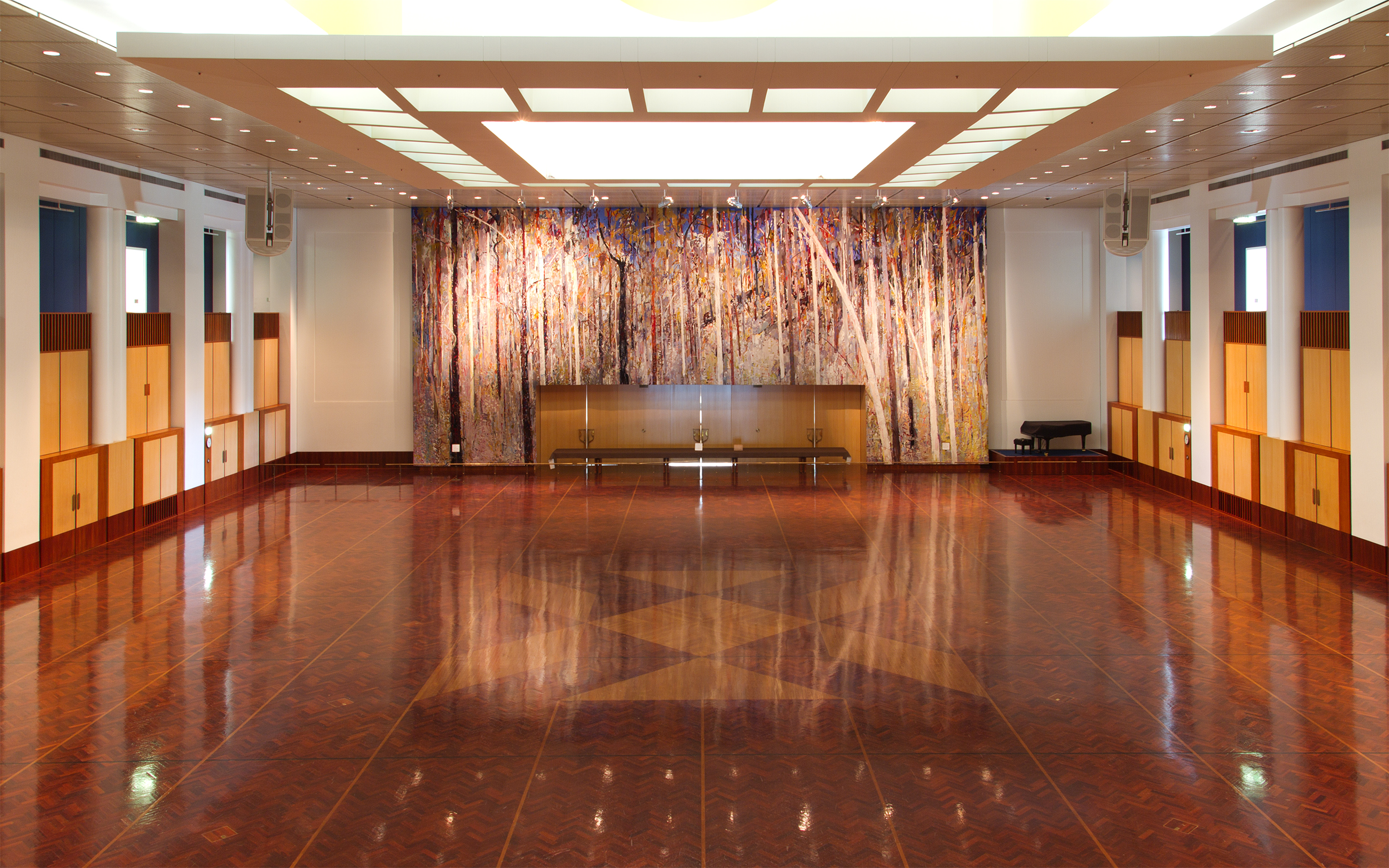
A tapestry which is a greatly enlarged version of Boyd's original painting. It is one of the world's largest tapestries and hangs in the Great Hall of the Australian Parliament House.

Boyd donated a villa in Tuscany to the Australia Council for an artist-in-residence program in 1982. In 1984, he was commissioned to design a tapestry based on the painting Untitled (Shoalhaven Landscape) for the Great Hall at the new Parliament House in Canberra. The work is one of the world's largest tapestries. Yet Boyd could not find the strength to fight for the retention of the lower rectangle ablated by the building consultants. This tapestry was produced in the Victorian Tapestry Workshop, Melbourne. He also produced sixteen canvasses for the foyer of the Victorian Arts Centre in the same year.

Boyd again represented Australia at the 1988 Venice Biennale with eight major works; and at the 2000 Venice Biennale. Boyd was commissioned to paint Earth and Fire for the cover of the 28 November 1988 Time magazine special issue dealing with environmental conservation in Australia.

=== Final years ===
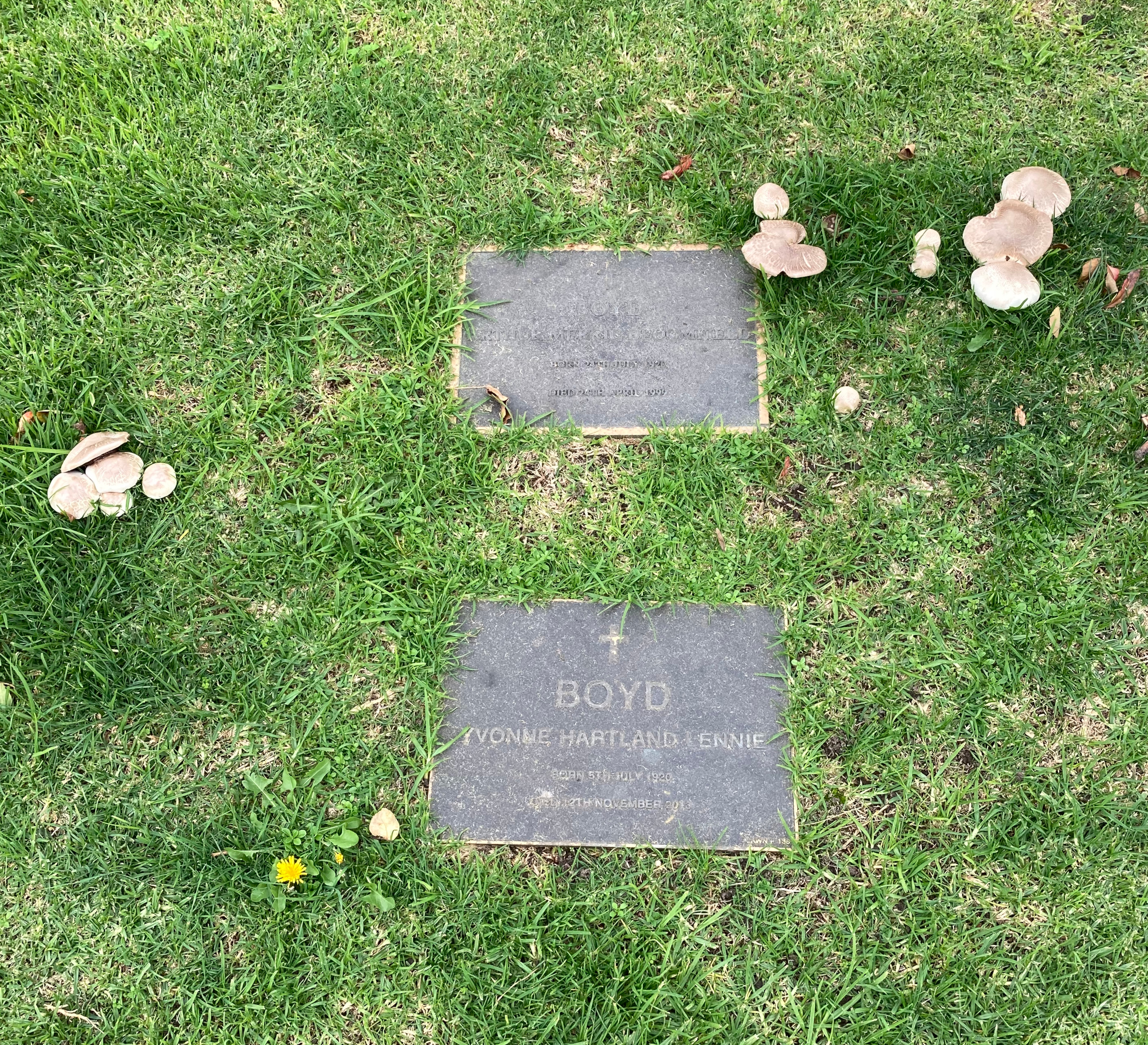
Boyd's grave at Brighton General Cemetery

A major retrospective of Boyd's work was exhibited at the Art Gallery of New South Wales in 1993.

In 1997 for the first time Boyd exhibited together with the six members of his artistic dynasty under one roof; with brothers David and Guy, son Jamie, and nieces Lenore and Tessa Perceval. The exhibition entitled the Best of Boyd comprised 80 paintings and 40 bronze sculptures. The exhibition was held in Galeria Aniela Fine Art Gallery and Sculpture Park, NSW. Documentary reviews were shown on the ABC TV Australian National News, 18 May 1997 and the ABC TV Sunday Afternoon, June 1997.

Boyd died in 1999 at 78 years of age, and was buried at Brighton General Cemetery. He was survived by his wife Yvonne, their son Jamie, and daughters Polly and Lucy.

== Bundanon Trust ==
In 1993 the Australian Government accepted the gift of Bundanon, valued at the time at A$20 million. The 1,100 hectares (2,700 acres) property owned by Arthur and Yvonne Boyd was given to the people of Australia. Located approximately 20 kilometres (12 mi) west of Nowra, the gift was entrusted to the Bundanon Trust, along with further gifts by Boyd, including copyright of all of his artwork, and several thousand works of art from five generations of Boyds, and other Australian artists. These properties provide an environment that promotes visual arts, writing, music and other performing arts, and the promotion of education and research in the arts.

=== Directors ===
Current and past directors and board members include:

- Alice Spigelman
- David Gonski
- James Spigelman
- Gene Sherman 1995–2002
- Jim Service

=== Bundanon Trust artists in residence ===
- Steve Lopes
- Josh Foley 2016
- Jennifer Joseph 2003

=== Bundanon Trust musicians in residence ===
- Marshall McGuire 2003

=== Bundanon Trust poets in residence ===
- Eileen Chong 2016

== Technique ==
Boyd was a master at manipulating elements to express himself. He developed new techniques when he was still a teenager and later changed technique depending on his preferred style, media, location and what he was depicting.

He would often use loose strokes of thickly coated brushes. He applied paint with his fingers and palm because it is quicker, while the body contact directly connected him with the painting. He believed this allowed for a greater sense of freedom and pleasure from the act of painting.

== Honours and awards ==
Boyd was appointed an Officer of the Order of the British Empire on 1 January 1970 for services to art. On 26 January 1979, Boyd was appointed an Officer of the Order of Australia for service to the visual arts. In recognition of his service to the visual arts and to the development of Australian artists and crafts people, Boyd was appointed a Companion of the Order of Australia on 8 June 1992.

In 1995, the Prime Minister announced Boyd as Australian of the Year for his contribution to Australian art and his generosity to the Australian people.

Australia Post honoured Boyd in 1998 with a series of postage stamps produced with his photo and examples of his work.

== Notable sales of works ==
- 2000: Dreaming Bridegroom I (1957) sold for A$957,000.
- 2000: Mourning Bride I (1958) sold for A$833,000.
- 2011: Frightened Bridegroom (1958) sold for A$1.2 million.
- 2012: Dry Creek Bed, Alice Springs (1953–54) sold for A$1.2 million.
- 2012: Bride Running Away (1957) sold for A$1.68 million, setting a new record for a Boyd work.

=== Selected works ===
Boyd's subjects were often mythical, realistic, malformed people and monsters, depicting a tragic drama.

- Creek near Rosebud, 1937
- The Seasons, 1944
- The Lovers, 1944
- David and Saul, 1946
- Melbourne Burning, 1946–1947
- Wimmera Landscape, 1950
- Merric Boyd, 1952
- Half Cast Child, 1957
- Moses leading the People, 1957
- Lovers with a Bluebird, 1962
- Figure supporting Back Legs, 1973
- Riversdale Bushland, 1976
- Flood receding one Winter Evening, 1981
- Bathers Pulpit Rock, 1985

== See also ==
- Australian art
- Boyd family

== Bibliography ==
- Niall, Brenda (2002). The Boyds. Melbourne: Melbourne University Press. ISBN 0-522-84871-0.
- Featherstone, Don (Producer and Director) (1985). Arthur Boyd: Figures in the Landscape (50 minutes) (Motion picture). Featherstone Productions.
