= Jim Service =

Australian company director (1933–2021)

James Glen Service
- Born: 9 February 1933; Sydney
- Died: 29 September 2021 (aged 88); Canberra, Australian Capital Territory
- Education: Newington College
- Occupation: Company director
- Title: Jim Service AO HonFAIB

James Glen Service AO (9 February 1933 – 29 September 2021) was an Australian company director.

== Early life ==
Service was born in Sydney and spent the first four years of his life in Fiji. He was educated at Newington College (1945–1949). He gained his Intermediate Certificate in 1946 and Leaving Certificate in 1948 in which he obtained First Class Honours in English. In his final year he added First Class Honours in both Chemistry and Geology. Recognition for his academic ability and diligence saw him awarded the Wigram Allen Scholarship in 1947; the Edwin & May Grainger Scholarship and the Holliday Scholarship in 1948; and the RT Baker Scholarship in 1949.

== Business career ==
Apart from two years as a jackaroo, Service worked in Sydney until he moved to Canberra in 1964 as an executive of Moteliers.

In 1981 Service founded JG Service which is a national property and development consulting company based in Canberra. The company now employs around 100 staff in Australia and New Zealand. He served as national president of the Property Council of Australia, the Building Owners and Managers Association and chairman of the Australian Building Codes Board. Service was appointed a director and chairman of ACTEW in June 1995. He was also chairman of the ActewAGL Joint Venture Partnerships Board, TransACT Communications Pty Limited, TransACT Capital Communications Pty Limited, J G Service Pty Limited and JGS (UK) Limited; deputy chairman of Australand Property Group and a director of CapitaMall Trust Management Limited.

== Community involvement ==
Service was chairman of the ACT Salvation Army advisory board and a trustee of the CFMEU Children's Healthcare Trust. He was an adjunct professor of the National Institute for Governance. He was involved in Floriade, Olympics Project 2000, the Bundanon Trust, Australia Day in the National Capital Committee, ACT Board of Health, Australian and New Zealand Health Management Network and the Duke of Edinburgh Award Scheme.

== Cultural appointments ==
Service was the chairman of the National Museum of Australia from 1996 until 1999, chairman of the Canberra Theatre Trust from 1993 until 1995 and chairman of the National Gallery of Australia Foundation from 1994 until 1996.

== Honours ==
- Queen Elizabeth II Silver Jubilee Medal (1977)
- Member, Order of Australia (1990) – For Service to the community.
- Centenary Medal (2001) – For service in developing Australia's construction industry.
- Canberran of the Year (2001) – Awarded by the ACT Government
- Officer, Order of Australia (2004) – For service to business and to the community particularly through support for arts, cultural and charitable organisations.
- Newington Medallist (2011)
- University of Canberra Honorary Doctorate (2012) – To recognise his outstanding contribution to the Canberra community through his business, voluntary and philanthropic activities
