= Melbourne Burning =

Painting by Arthur Boyd

- Artist: Arthur Boyd
- Year: 1946-1947
- Type: Oil paint and tempera on canvas
- Dimensions: 90.2 by 100.21 centimetres (35.51 in × 39.45 in)
- Location: Museum of Old and New Art; Hobart

Melbourne Burning is a 1946-1947 painting by Australian artist Arthur Boyd. It has been described as "his apocalyptic image of Melbourne burning, like a Biblical narrative in the context of the second world war". The painting has been reported to have displayed in the Perth office of Robert Holmes à Court. It was purchased by David Walsh for AUD 3.2 million. It is "one of Walsh's favourite works". The painting is the collection of the Museum of Old and New Art.
