= Brian Wise =

Australian radio presenter

Brian Wise OAM
- Occupations: Broadcaster, journalist, editor
- Years active: 1980–present
- Known for: 3RRR, Rhythms Magazine
- Awards: Order of Australia

Brian Wise is an Australian music journalist and broadcaster based in Murrumbeena, Victoria. He is best known for his program Off The Record on Australian community radio station 3RRR.

== Biography ==
Brian Wise was one of the co-founders of Monash University's 3MU student radio station in 1972, and worked as a broadcaster at Melbourne's community radio station 3PBS between 1980 and 1987, when he started hosting Off The Record at 3RRR.

Off The Record started in November 1987 and aired Sunday nights until a Saturday morning slot became available in 1989, where it has remained since. The show features Americana/roots music and interviews with local and international guests.

In 1992 Wise founded the roots music magazine Rhythms Magazine after he visited the New Orleans Jazz and Heritage Festival and noticed the city had two monthly roots music magazines of their own, while Melbourne had none. Initially he had to work other jobs to fund the magazine, and later sold Rhythms in 2005. But after stepping away for several years he took back ownership in 2018.

Between 1997 and 2003 Wise was editor for the Australian edition of the online music magazine Addicted To Noise which twice won the national ONYA Award in 1999 and 2000 for Best Online Music Magazine. He also presented dig on the Radio with Michael MacKenzie on ABC Local Radio during summer between 2003 – 2006, and was a contributor to the ABC's Dig! website.

Wise has continued to host his weekly music program Off The Record on Saturday mornings, featuring news, reviews and interviews with local and international guests. The program has been called praised as one of the most popular on 3RRR, thanks to Wise being one of the few journalists covering roots music when the program begun. A one-hour version of Off The Record is also broadcast weekly to over 45 stations on Australia's Community Radio Network via satellite.

Outside of radio, Wise worked as a teacher of screen and media studies at Holmesglen TAFE, and previously reviewed music for The Sunday Age newspaper and The New Daily.

== Awards and achievements ==
- Vanguard Award from Americana Music Association for continued commitment to the Americana genre (2018)
- Order of Australia for service to the broadcast media (2021)
