= Elizabeth Fretwell =

Australian opera singer (1920–2006)

Betty Drina Fretwell OBE (13 August 1920 – 5 June 2006), known professionally as Elizabeth Fretwell, was an Australian soprano. She was the prima donna at London's Sadler's Wells Opera (English National Opera) through much of the 1950s and 1960s.

== Early life and career ==
Elizabeth Fretwell was born in Murrumbeena, a suburb of Melbourne, on 13 August 1920. As a child, she had hoped to become a ballerina. However, she grew too big for this profession. She focussed instead on singing, taking vocal studies in Melbourne. Her operatic career began in 1950. In 1954, she sang Antonia in Offenbach's The Tales of Hoffmann before Queen Elizabeth II who was on her first tour of Australia. In order to gain greater skill, she moved to London to study under the tenor Joseph Hislop who had also coached Jussi Björling and Birgit Nilsson.

After returning to Australia she quickly started to make a name for herself, taking soprano roles in operas by Mozart and Puccini, amongst others. It was while on an Australian national tour of Tosca that she had an extramarital affair with Australian Opera's principal baritone Robert Simmons (they were later to marry), with whom she later had a son, John Simmons, now a Melbourne architect, and a daughter Geraldine 'Geri' Roggiero née Simmons now a Sydney wildlife artist. This caused a scandal in 1950s Australia so she and Simmons headed for the United Kingdom.

== Sadler's Wells ==
Once in Britain, Fretwell's first professional engagement was for Dublin's Grand Opera company. Her performances there came to the attention of Sadler's Wells and in 1955 they engaged her services as principal soprano. It was at this point she became known as Elizabeth Fretwell. Sadler's was where Fretwell's finest performances were given, and she gained rave reviews. This was no small achievement given that at that time Maria Callas was dominant on the London opera stage. From the early 1960s to 1970 she went back and forth between Australia and the UK performing. In 1965 she gave her only performances at the Royal Opera House, Covent Garden, in Aida and Il tabarro. She also performed with Scottish and Canadian companies and in North America.

== Later career and death ==
In 1969 Fretwell sang opposite Tito Gobbi in Falstaff, finally joining the ensemble of The Australian Opera in 1970. During 1973 she sang in the opening season of the Sydney Opera House. She remained a member of the Australian Opera (now Opera Australia) until her retirement. In her later career, she took on smaller roles, to give up-and-coming singers there a chance to further their careers as principal singers.

Her retirement was very low key; no one in the company knew of her impending retirement before she left. She did not want any fanfare or accolades at her last performance, and therefore only the management of the Australian Opera knew of her decision to retire in the late 1980s. She simply gave her last performance, then quietly went to her dressing room, packed up her makeup and personal belongings, and went home to her beloved house at Bayview, on the northern beaches of Sydney, and reverted to her married name of Betty Simmons. She later served on the Opera Foundation's board for a number of years.

She was appointed an Officer of the Order of the British Empire in 1977. On 5 June 2006, she died suddenly at her Bayview home, from a ruptured cerebral artery aneurysm, aged 85. She was survived by her son and daughter, and four grandchildren.
