= Jennifer Joseph =

Australian artist

Jennifer Joseph (born 1949) is a Melbourne-based artist whose work aligns closely with the aestheticism of the Abstract art movement. In 1971 Joseph received her diploma of Arts and Crafts from Melbourne Teachers' College. She went on to study Fine Art part-time at RMIT University, Australia between 1977 until 1979. Despite her foray with art school and education, Joseph considers herself essentially self-taught.

Joseph's work focuses on abstract compositions that incorporate graphite, linen, wood, acrylic paint, paper, and found objects, often integrating drawing and collage. Her artistic process involves prolonged experimentation with materials and composition before producing finished works in relatively short periods. She has stated that she works primarily at night.

== Exhibitions and collections ==
Jennifer Joseph's artistic career spans over 30 years. Joseph has been shown in prolific national and international shows including Blue Chip XVIII: The Collectors’ Exhibition, 2016, Niagara Galleries, Melbourne; Abstracting the Collection, 2004, Heide Museum of Modern Art, Melbourne; Text Art Object: Australian Contemporary Art, 2002, Conny Dietzschold Gallery, Cologne, Germany; and Decadence: 10 Years of Exhibitions at 200 Gertrude Street, Gertrude Contemporary, Melbourne. Joseph’s work is also represented in a number of private and public art collections both within Australia and internationally. These collections include the British Museum, London; the National Gallery of Victoria, Melbourne; Heide Museum of Modern Art, Melbourne; and private collections in Australia, New Zealand, USA, England and Japan.

== Awards ==
The significance of Jennifer Joseph's work has been recognised through a number of awards and grants. She received the 2003 Bundanon Trust Artist-in-Residence; the 1995 Pat Corrigan Artist Grant (NAVA); a Studio residency at 200 Gertrude Street, Melbourne between 1993 and 1995; and the 1989 Visual Arts/Crafts Board of the Australia Council Artists’ Development/Project Grant.
