= Yvonne Boyd =

Australian artist

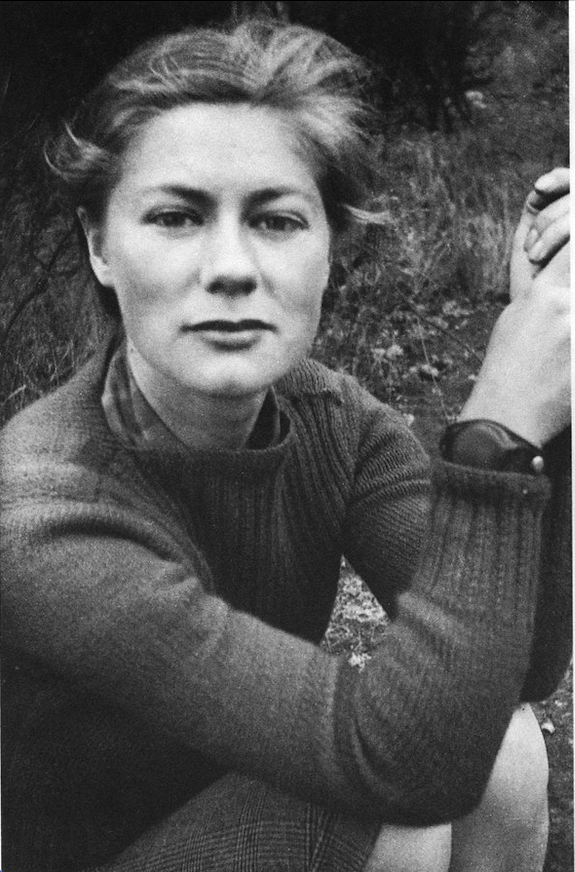
- Born: July 5, 1920; Melbourne, Victoria, Australia
- Died: November 12, 2013 (aged 93); Gisborne, Victoria, Australia
- Education: Victorian College of the Arts
- Spouse: Arthur Merric Bloomfield Boyd
- Children: Jamie Boyd, Polly Boyd, Lucy Boyd

Yvonne Boyd (born Yvonne Harland Lennie) (5 July 1920 – 12 November 2013) was an artist, art patron, philanthropist, and a member of the Boyd artistic dynasty.

== Early life ==
Born to John Lennie and Edna (Harland) Lennie, Yvonne was a talented student, educated in the private system. She went on to study at the Royal Academy (now known as the Victorian College of the Arts), and became a talented painter, winning art prizes for her drawing.

Two early works, Melbourne Tram 1944 and In Kensington c1944 reflect social realism, showing people who are disadvantaged in society.

== Biography ==
Yvonne met Arthur Merric Bloomfield Boyd in 1940 when they were attending drawing classes at the Commercial Artists Association. They married in 1945.

In November 1950 Yvonne and fellow artist John Yule held the first exhibition of the Aladdin Gallery, on the corner of Glenferrie Road and Christobel Crescent, Hawthorn. The gallery comprised a large room and a hallway in the home of Mrs Elsie Smith and her son, Martin, and aimed to address the shortage of galleries, and also to provide housewives of the district with a local gallery. The exhibition included Christmas cards, paintings and pottery.

In January 1954, decorative tiles with handpainted Aboriginal designs painted by Yvonne were being sold at Peter Bray's in Bourke Street, Melbourne for 15/- each.

The focus of Yvonne's work gradually moved from pursuing her own artistic career to supporting Arthur's. In 1993, Yvonne reflected on her earlier art career by saying, "I did study art in a sort of desultory way that one used to when I was young." Yvonne became Arthur's informal business manager, in her words, "working behind the scenes", dealing with art dealers and galleries.

She was also focused on family life, raising three children, Polly, Jamie and Lucy, all of whom became artists.

In 1993, Yvonne and Arthur Boyd gifted to the Australian people their property, Bundanon, comprising over 1,000 hectares of bush and parkland. It overlooks the Shoalhaven River, on the south coast of New South Wales.

Bundanon is an art museum and learning centre. Its collection is made up of artworks from members of the Boyd family and their contemporaries, as well as contemporary and Indigenous artworks.
