= Doris Boyd =

Australian artist (1888–1960)

- Born: Doris Lucy Eleanor Bloomfield Gough; 20 November 1888
- Died: 13 June 1960 (aged 71)
- Burial place: Brighton General Cemetery
- Education: National Gallery School
- Known for: Pottery, painting
- Movement: Boyd family
- Spouse: Merric Boyd (m. 1915)
- Children: Lucy Boyd, Arthur Boyd, Guy Boyd, David Boyd, Mary Boyd

Doris Lucy Eleanor Bloomfield Boyd (née Gough; 20 November 1888 – 13 June 1960) was an Australian artist, painter and ceramicist.

== Early life ==
Doris Boyd was the youngest of six children, born to Victorian Naval Forces Lieutenant Thomas Bunbury Gough and Evelyn Anna Walker Gough (née Rigg).

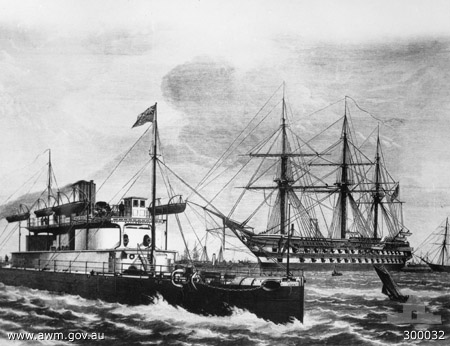
Ironclad HMVS Cerberus with training ship HMVS Nelson at a distance, Victorian Naval Force ships

Doris grew up in an unusual household, in which her mother's buoyant spirit, radical politics and Christian Science faith contrasted with her father's conservative background and temperament. Her family line ran directly back to Thomas Bunbury Gough, a Dean of Derry, brother to the great soldier Hugh Gough, the 1st Viscount Gough. Bunbury Gough was a Lieutenant in the Victorian Navy between 1885 and 1888, a high rank at the time. As Lieutenant, he was in charge of running the HMVS Cerberus when the Commander was not on board. Outside of his naval career in Victoria, he worked variously as a merchant, as an insurance agent, and as a commission agent, as did his father-in-law. Evelyn was co-proprietor of The Sun: A Society Courier.

Doris Gough studied under Bernard Hall and Frederick McCubbin at the National Gallery School where she met Merric Boyd, a fellow student and potter. Boyd came from a background of artists who collectively formed the Boyd family.

In 1915, she married Boyd, and together they raised five children: Lucy, Arthur (painter, ceramics), Guy (pottery, sculpture), David (pottery, painting) and Mary.

== Career ==
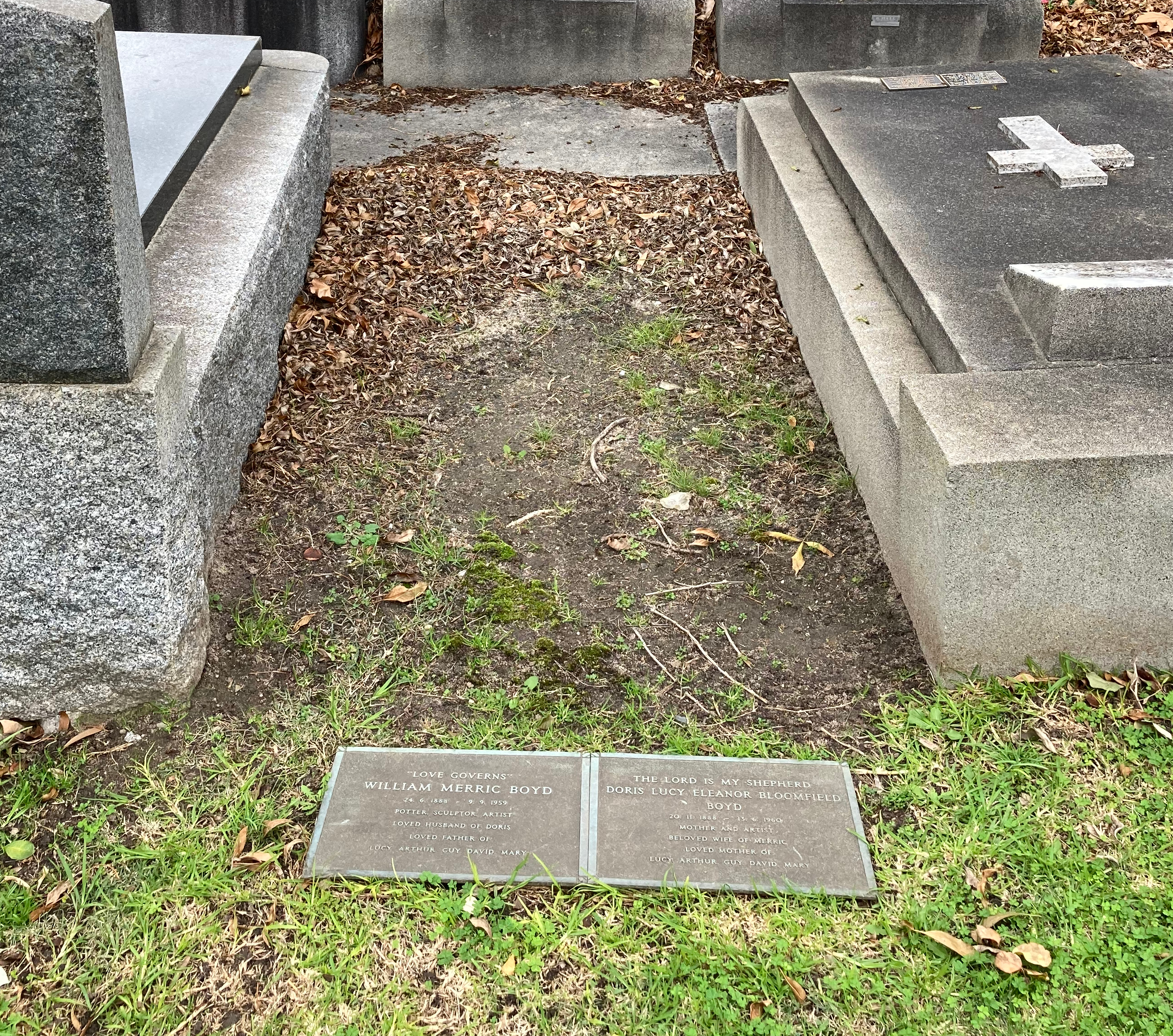
Graves of Doris and Merric Boyd at Brighton General Cemetery

Doris decorated many of Merric Boyd's works between 1920 and 1930. These were mostly pieces for domestic use, featuring Australian flora and fauna. Boyd's Murrumbeena studio and his pottery were destroyed by fire in 1926.

With a strong faith in Christian Science, Doris influenced her husband, an epileptic, to convert in his latter years. She died on 13 June 1960, nine months after Merric. They are buried side by side at Brighton General Cemetery, Caulfield South, Victoria, Australia.
