= Steve Lopes =

Australian figurative artist

- Born: 1971 (age 54–55)
- Education: University of New South Wales
- Occupation: Figurative artist
- Years active: 1991–present
- Website: https://www.stevelopes.com.au/

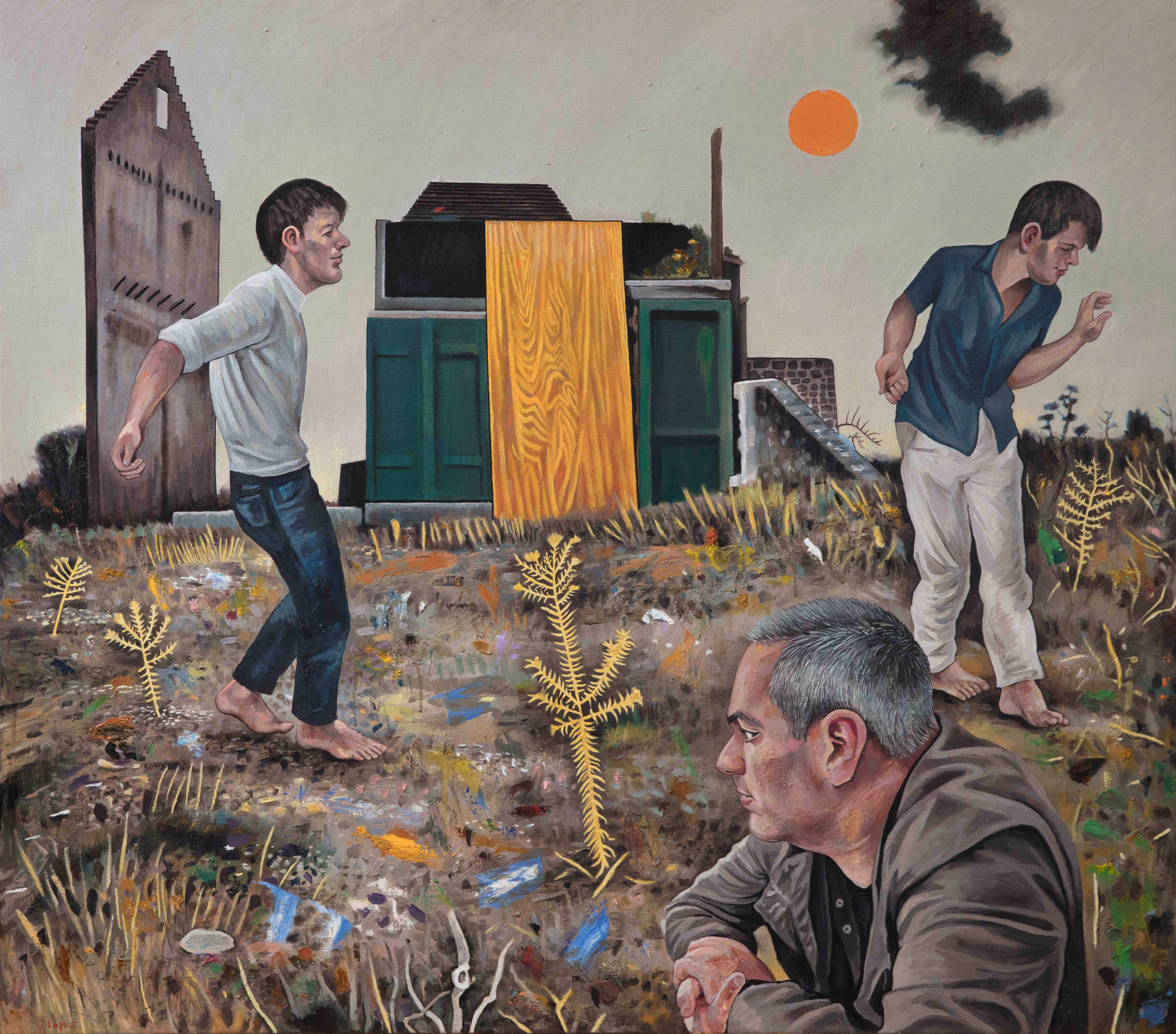

Steve Lopes is an Australian figurative artist. He has exhibited in 50 solo shows across Australia, New York, London and Hong Kong. His work is collected in the National Gallery of Australia, Federal Parliament House Art Collection Canberra, State Library of NSW, Bundanon Collection, Gallipoli Memorial Club, Time Warner Collection New York, Rolls-Royce London and public galleries and private collections around the world.

== Early life ==
Lopes studied at the University of New South Wales, Sydney, attaining a Bachelor of Arts (Fine Arts) in 1991. He studied and worked in London, and at the Art Students League, New York.

== Career ==
He has held painting residencies including Red Gate Gallery in Beijing; Bundanon Trust Studios, New South Wales; Your Friend the Enemy painting project in Gallipoli; Salient, Contemporary Artists at the Western Front; 'Lustre' Greece, Yellow Mountain, China, and Queenstown, New Zealand, through The Nock Art Foundation.

He lives and works in New South Wales, Australia.

== Awards ==
- Winner, The King's School Art Prize 2021
- Winner, Gallipoli Art Prize 2018
- Young Artist Award, Royal Institute of Oil Painters, London
- Finalist, Brett Whiteley Travelling Art Scholarship; Archibald Prize "Salon des Refuses" (10 times); Kilgour Figurative Awards, Kedumba; Parliament Plein Air Prize; Doug Moran Portrait Prize (8 times)
