= Rhythms Magazine =

Australian music magazine

- Editor: Brian Wise
- Categories: Music
- Frequency: Bi-monthly
- Total circulation: 120,000
- Founder: Brian Wise
- Founded: 1992
- Country: Australia
- Based in: Melbourne, Victoria
- Language: English
- Website: rhythms.com.au

Rhythms Magazine is a bi-monthly Australian music magazine, focusing on blues, folk, jazz, and world music, which was first published in 1992 in Melbourne.

== History ==
The magazine was founded by Brian Wise OAM in April 1992 after he visited the New Orleans Jazz and Heritage Festival and noticed the city had two monthly roots music magazines and was inspired to start his own in Melbourne.

In 2005 the magazine was purchased by Martin Jones and Verity Bee who ran Rhythms Magazine until 2016. They announced they were putting Rhythms up for sale in 2015, and it was initially sold to Australian country singer Catherine Beverley and her husband James Beverley, before Brian Wise took back ownership in 2018.

In 2007 Rhythms celebrated 15 years of publishing with a 2CD compilation 15 Years Of Rhythms. The compilation featured 38 songs by artists such as John Lee Hooker, Kasey Chambers, and Bob Dylan, and was called "a superb demonstration that great music is alive and well".

Currently, Rhythms Magazine distributes 120,000 internationally each year, and is also available digitally. It is distributed by Fairfax Media
