= Olympic Pylon =

Coordinates: 37°49′25″S 144°58′48″E

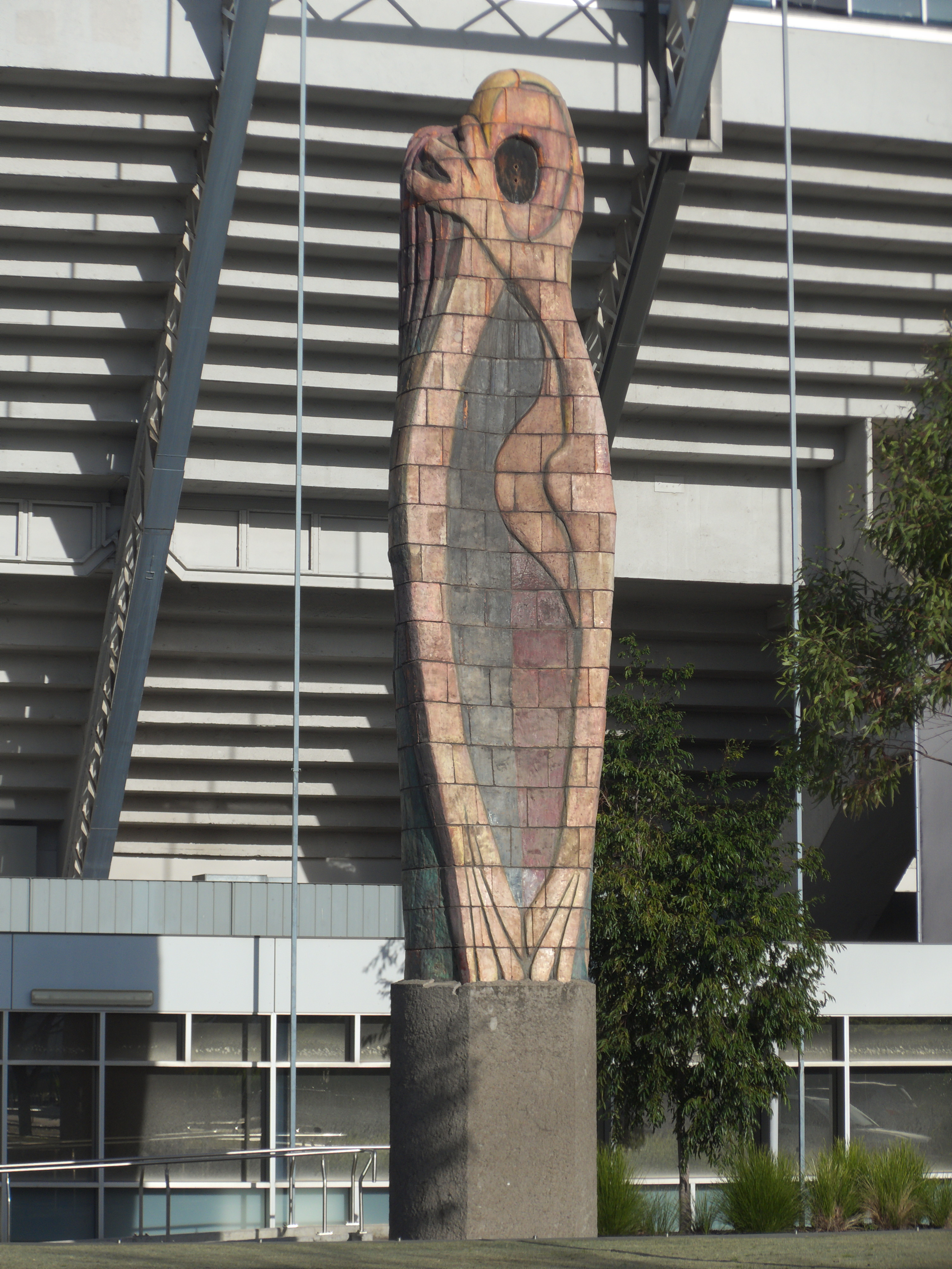
The sculpture outside the Melbourne Sports and Entertainment Centre

The Olympic Pylon is a ceramic sculpture by Australian artist Arthur Boyd, created in 1956. It was included on a non-statutory heritage list by the Victorian branch of the National Trust on 7 May 2001.
