= Sam Neill filmography =

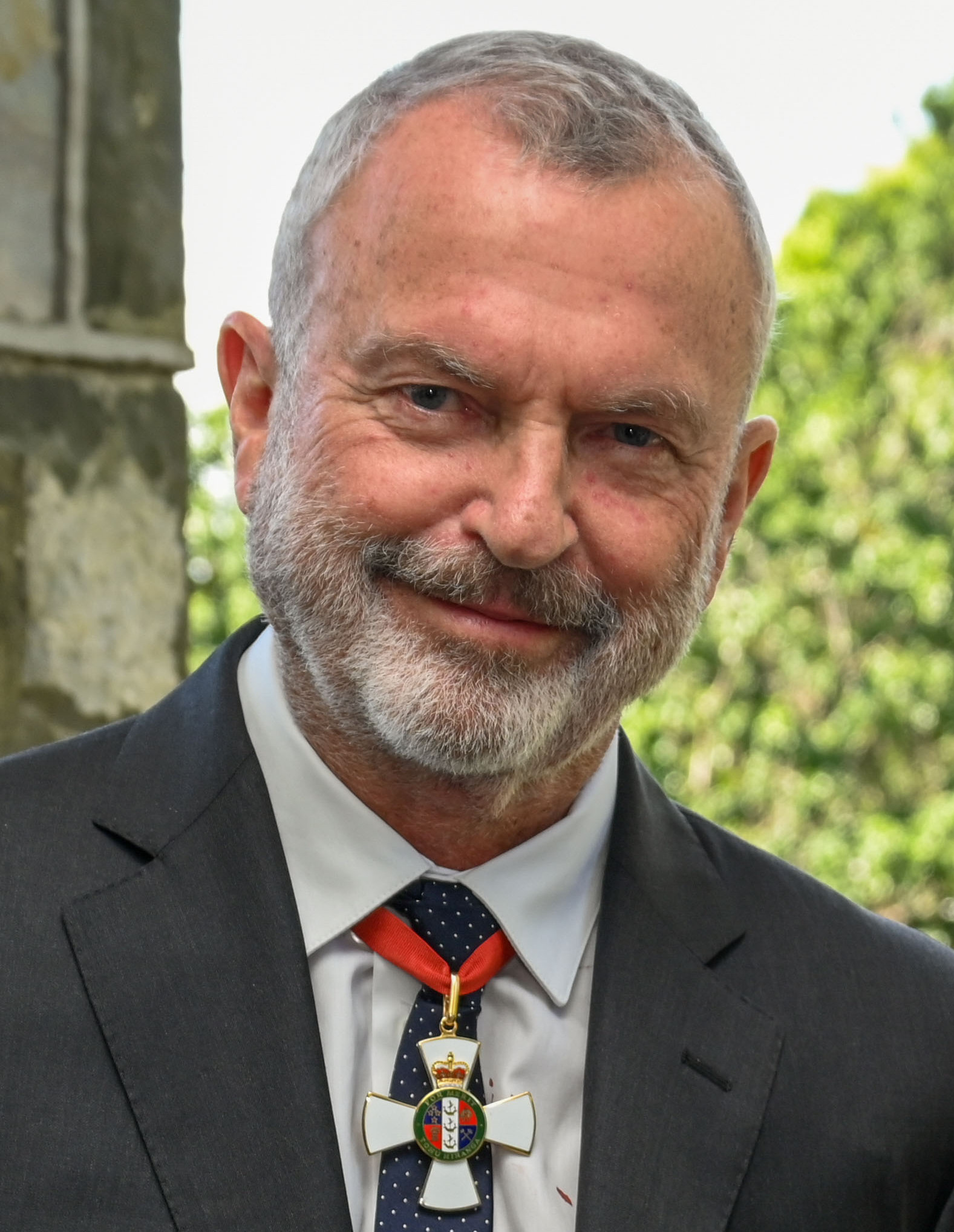
Neill in 2022

Sam Neill (14 September 1947 – 13 July 2026) was a New Zealand actor whose career in film and television spanned nearly five decades. He made his screen debut in the New Zealand television film The City of No (1971). He subsequently appeared in the short film The Water Cycle (1972) and the television film Hunt's Duffer (1973). In 1974, he wrote and directed Phone, a short film produced for the New Zealand National Film Unit.

He made his feature film debut in Sleeping Dogs (1977) and went on to appear in films including: My Brilliant Career (1979), Omen III: The Final Conflict (1981), Possession (1981), Dead Calm (1989), The Hunt for Red October (1990), The Piano (1993), Jurassic Park (1993), In the Mouth of Madness (1994), Event Horizon (1997), Bicentennial Man (1999), Jurassic Park III (2001), Thor: Ragnarok (2017), Peter Rabbit (2018), Peter Rabbit 2: The Runaway (2021) and Jurassic World Dominion (2022).

Neill also had an extensive television career, with roles in series, miniseries and television films including: Reilly, Ace of Spies (1983), Merlin (1998), The Tudors (2007–2010), Alcatraz (2012), Peaky Blinders (2013–2014), Invasion (2021–2025) and Apples Never Fall (2024). He also appeared in documentaries and provided voice performances for film and television.

During his career, Neill received nominations for: three Golden Globes, two Primetime Emmy Awards and a British Academy Television Award.

Neill was regarded as one of New Zealand's most prominent actors and was noted for the breadth of his work across film and television.

Neill died on 13 July 2026 in Sydney, Australia, aged 78.

== Film ==
Year	Title	Role	Notes	Ref.
1972	The Water Cycle	Himself	"Short"	^{[54]}
1974	Telephone Etiquette	Himself	"Short"; Directed, Written & Starred Sam Neill	^{[54]}
1975	Landfall	Eric		
1975	Ashes	Priest	"Short"	
1977	Sleeping Dogs	Smith		
1979	Just Out of Reach	Mike		
1979	The Journalist	Rex		
1979	My Brilliant Career	Harry Beecham		
1981	The Final Conflict	Damien Thorn		
1981	Possession	Mark		
1981	From a Far Country	Marian		
1982	Attack Force Z	Sergeant D.J. "Danny" Costello		
1982	Enigma	Dimitri Vasilikov		
1983	The Country Girls	Mr. Gentleman		
1985	Robbery Under Arms	Captain Starlight		
1985	Plenty	Lazar		
1986	For Love Alone	James Quick		
1987	The Umbrella Woman	Neville Gifford		
1988	Leap of Faith	Oscar Ogg		
1988	Evil Angels	Michael Chamberlain	Won – AACTA Award for Best Actor in a Leading Role	
1989	Dead Calm	John Ingram		
1989	La Révolution française	Marquis de Lafayette		
1989	Shadow of China	TV reporter	Credited as John Dermot	
1990	The Hunt for Red October	Captain 2^{nd} rank Vasily Borodin		
1990	Death in Brunswick	Carl 'Cookie' Fitzgerald	Nominated – AACTA Award for Best Actor in a Leading Role	
1991	Until the End of the World	Eugene Fitzpatrick		
1992	Memoirs of an Invisible Man	David Jenkins	Nominated – Saturn Award for Best Supporting Actor	
1992	Hostage	John Rennie		
1993	The Piano	Alisdair Stewart	Nominated – AACTA Award for Best Actor in a Supporting Role	
1993	Jurassic Park	Dr. Alan Grant		
1994	Sirens	Norman Lindsay		
1994	Country Life	Dr. Max Askey		
1994	The Jungle Book	Colonel Geoffrey Brydon		
1994	In the Mouth of Madness	John Trent		
1995	Restoration	King Charles II		
1995	Cinema of Unease: A Personal Journey by Sam Neill	Narrator	Voice; documentary; also writer and director	
1996	Children of the Revolution	Nine		
1996	Victory	Mr. Jones		
1997	Event Horizon	Dr. William Weir		
1997	Snow White: A Tale of Terror	Lord Fredrick Hoffman		
1998	The Horse Whisperer	Robert MacLean		
1998	Sweet Revenge	Henry Bell		
1999	Molokai: The Story of Father Damien	Walter Murray Gibson		
1999	Bicentennial Man	'Sir' Richard Martin		
2000	My Mother Frank	Professor Mortlock	Nominated – AACTA Award for Best Actor in a Supporting Role	
2000	The Dish	Cliff Buxton		
2000	The Magic Pudding	Sam Sawnoff	Voice	
2001	Jurassic Park III	Dr. Alan Grant		
2001	The Zookeeper	Ludovic	Won – Ft. Lauderdale International Film Festival Award for Best Actor	
2002	Dirty Deeds	Detective Sergeant Ray Murphy		
2003	Perfect Strangers	The Man		
2004	Yes	Anthony		
2004	Wimbledon	Dennis Bradbury		
2004	Colin McCahon: I Am	Colin McCahon	Voice; documentary	^{[54]}
2005	Gallipoli	Narrator	Voice; documentary	
2005	Little Fish	The Jockey		
2006	Irresistible	Craig		
2007	Angel	Théo		
2007	The Making Of 'Daybreakers'	Himself / Charles Bromley	Documentary	
2008	Dean Spanley	Dean Spanley		
2008	Skin	Abraham Laing		
2009	In Her Skin	Mr. Reid		
2009	Under the Mountain	Mr. Jones		
2009	Daybreakers	Charles Bromley		
2010	Legend of the Guardians: The Owls of Ga'Hoole	Allomere	Voice	
2011	The Dragon Pearl	Chris Chase		
2011	The Hunter	Jack Mindy	Nominated – AACTA Award for Best Actor in a Supporting Role	
2012	The Vow	Bill Thornton		
2013	Escape Plan	Dr. Kyrie		
2013	The Adventurer: The Curse of the Midas Box	Otto Luger		
2014	United Passions	João Havelange		
2014	A Long Way Down	Minister Crichton		
2015	Backtrack	Duncan Stewart		
2015	The Daughter	Walter Finch	Nominated – AACTA Award for Best Actor in a Supporting Role	
2015	MindGamers	Kreutz		
2016	Hunt for the Wilderpeople	Uncle Hec		
2016	Tommy's Honour	Alexander Boothby		
2017	Sweet Country	Fred Smith		
2017	Thor: Ragnarok	Odin Actor	Cameo	
2018	The Commuter	Captain David Hawthorne		
2018	Peter Rabbit	Mr. McGregor / Tommy Brock	Voice (for character Tommy Brock)	
2019	Palm Beach	Leo		
2019	Blackbird	Paul		
2019	Ride Like a Girl	Paddy Payne	Nominated – AFCA Award for Best Supporting Actor	
2019	Take Home Pay	Wedding Planner	Cameo	
2020	Rams	Colin		
2021	Daisy Quokka: World's Scariest Animal	Frankie Scales	Voice	
2021	Peter Rabbit 2: The Runaway	Tommy Brock	Voice	
2022	Jurassic World Dominion	Dr. Alan Grant		
2022	Thor: Love and Thunder	Odin Actor	Cameo	
2023	The Portable Door	Dennis Tanner		
2023	Assassin Club	Jonathan Caldwell		
2023	Scarygirl	Dr. Maybee	Voice	
2023	Bring Him to Me	Frank McCarthy		
2025	The Fox	The Magpie	Voice	
2027	Godzilla x Kong: Supernova †		Posthumous release	
2027	The Legend of Zelda †		Posthumous release	
2027	The Last Resort †	Gerard	Posthumous release	

== Television ==
Year	Title	Role	Notes	Ref.
1971	The City of No	"A Neighbour"	Television film	_{[54]}
1973	Hunt's Duffer	Bradley	Television film	_{[54]}
1979–1980	The Sullivans	Ben Dawson	40 episodes	
1980	Lucinda Brayford	Tony Duff	Miniseries	
1982	Ivanhoe	Brian de Bois-Guilbert	Television film	
1983	Reilly, Ace of Spies	Sidney Reilly	Miniseries; Nominated – Golden Globe Award for Best Actor – Miniseries or Television Film	
1984	The Blood of Others	Dieter Bergman	Television film	
1985	Kane and Abel	William Lowell Kane	Miniseries	
1986	Strong Medicine	Vince Lord	Television film	
1987	Amerika	Colonel Andrei Denisov	Miniseries	
1991	Fever	Eliott	Television film	
1991	One Against the Wind	Major James Leggatt	Television film Nominated – Golden Globe Award for Best Actor – Miniseries or Television Film	
1993	Family Pictures	David Eberlin	Television film	
1993	The Rainbow Warrior	Alan Galbraith	Television film	
1994	The Simpsons	Molloy	Voice; episode: "Homer the Vigilante"	
1995	Forgotten Silver	Himself	Television film	
1996	In Cold Blood	Agent Alvin Dewey	Miniseries	
1998	Merlin	Merlin	Miniseries; Nominated – Primetime Emmy Award for Outstanding Lead Actor in a Limited or Anthology Series or Movie; Nominated – Golden Globe Award for Best Actor – Miniseries or Television Film	
1998	The Games	Citytrans CEO	Episode: "Transport"	
2000	Sally Hemings: An American Scandal	Thomas Jefferson	Miniseries	
2001	Leunig Animated	Narrator	Voice; 50 episodes	
2001	Space	Himself	Host; documentary series	
2001	Submerged	Lt. Cmdr. Charles Momsen	Television film	
2002	Doctor Zhivago	Victor Komarovsky	Miniseries	
2002	Framed	Eddie Meyers	Television film	
2004	Stiff	Lionel Merricks	Television film	
2004	Jessica	Richard Runche	Miniseries; Logie Award for Outstanding Actor in a Drama Series; Nominated – AACTA Award for Best Lead Actor in a Television Drama	
2005	The Incredible Journey of Mary Bryant	Governor Arthur Phillip	Miniseries	
2005	To the Ends of the Earth	Mr. Prettiman	Miniseries	
2005	The Triangle	Eric Benerall	Miniseries; Nominated – Saturn Award for Best Supporting Actor on Television	
2006	Merlin's Apprentice	Merlin	Miniseries	
2006	Two Twisted	Mick	Episode: "Von Stauffenberg's Stamp"	
2007	The Tudors	Cardinal Thomas Wolsey	10 episodes Nominated – Gemini Award for Best Performance by an Actor in a Supporting Role in a Drama Series; Nominated – Nymphe d'Or Award for Outstanding Actor in a Drama Series	
2008–2009	Crusoe	Jeremiah Blackthorn	14 episodes	
2009	Iron Road	Alfred Nichol	Miniseries	
2009	bro'Town	Himself	Voice; episode: "To Sam with Love"	
2010	Happy Town	Merritt Grieves	8 episodes	
2010	Rake	Dr. Bruce Chandler	Episode: "R v Chandler"	
2011	Ice	Anthony Kavanagh	Miniseries	
2012	Alcatraz	Emerson Hauser	13 episodes	
2013	Harry	Jim "Stocks" Stockton	Miniseries	
2013	The Ordained	Gov. Michael Thomas Riley	Television film	^{[54]}
2013–2014	Peaky Blinders	Major Chester Campbell	12 episodes	
2014	Short Poppies	Mr. Neal	Episode: Louise Cooper	_{[54]}
2014	Old School	Ted Macabe	8 episodes	
2014	House of Hancock	Lang Hancock	Miniseries	
2015	And Then There Were None	General John Gordon MacArthur	Miniseries	
2016	Tutankhamun	Lord Carnarvon	Miniseries	
2016	New Zealand: Earth's Mythical Islands	Narrator	Documentary; Nominated – Primetime Emmy Award for Outstanding Narrator	
2016	Why Anzac with Sam Neill	Himself	Documentary; also writer and producer	
2016	Country Calendar	Himself	Episode: "Film Noir"	
2017	Julia Zemiro's Home Delivery	Himself	1 episode	
2017	Get Krack!n	Himself	1 episode	
2018	The Pacific: In the Wake of Captain Cook with Sam Neill	Himself	Documentary series	
2019	Rick and Morty	Monogatron Leader	Voice; episode: "The Old Man and the Seat"	
2020	Flack	Duncan Paulson	Episode: "Duncan"	
2020, 2023	Australian Story	Himself	2 episodes	
2021	Invasion	Sheriff Jim Bell Tyson	Episode: "Last Day"	
2022–2025	The Twelve	Brett Colby	Main role	
2024	Apples Never Fall	Stan Delaney	Miniseries	
2024	T. REX	Narrator	Documentary	
2024	The Assembly	Himself / Interviewee	Documentary	
2025	Untamed	Paul Souter	Main role	

== Video games ==
Year	Title	Role	Notes	Ref.
2015	Lego Jurassic World	Dr. Alan Grant	Archive audio from the films	
2018	Jurassic World Evolution	Dr. Alan Grant	Voice role; Return to Jurassic Park expansion	
2021	Jurassic World Evolution 2	Dr. Alan Grant	Voice role; Biosyn Dominion expansion	

== See also ==
- Cinema of New Zealand
- List of New Zealand actors
