= Jackie Woodburne =

Australian actress (born 1956)

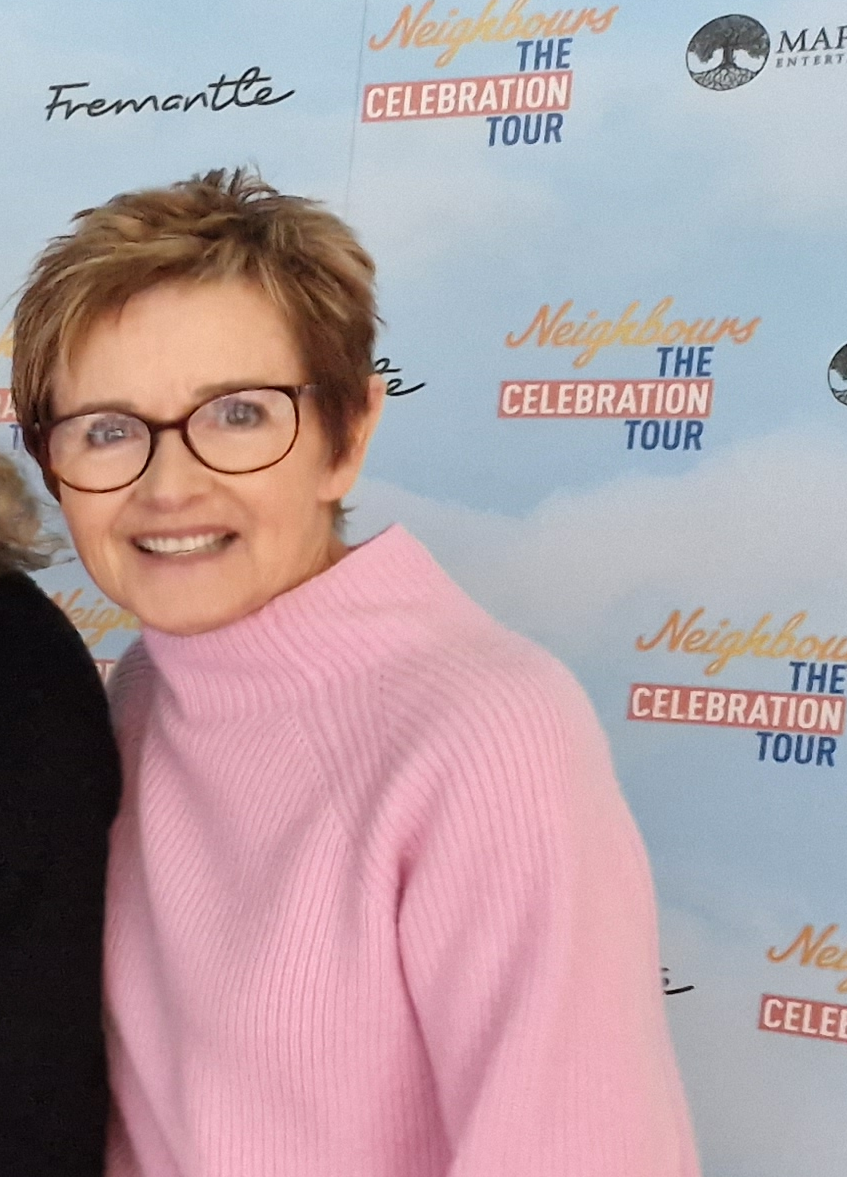
- Woodburne in 2023 at the Neighbours Celebration Tour
- Born: Jacqueline Ann Woodburne; 5 February 1956 (age 70); Carrickfergus, Northern Ireland
- Occupation: Actress
- Years active: 1980–present
- Known for: Neighbours as Susan Kennedy
- Notable work: Prisoner as Julie "Chook" Egbert; The Young Doctors as Maggie Gordon; Cop Shop as Gina Rossi; 1915 as Dianne Bendetto

Jacqueline Anne Woodburne (born 5 February 1956) is a Northern Ireland–born Australian actress, known for her numerous roles in television soap operas. After graduating from the National Theatre School, Woodburne played Maggie Gordon in The Young Doctors. She appeared in Cop Shop as Gina Rossi, and then she was cast as inmate Julie "Chook" Egbert in Prisoner. From 1994 to 2025, Woodburne played teacher Susan Kennedy in Neighbours.

In the 1980s, Woodburne appeared in multiple miniseries', including Outbreak of Love, Sara Dane, and 1915, which earned her a Logie Award nomination. By 1985, Woodburne had had a starring role in a major series on every network. Since 2014, Woodburne has starred as Dr Anastasia Black in the sci-fi comedy audio series Night Terrace.

== Early life ==
Woodburne was born in Carrickfergus, Northern Ireland. Her father was a policeman in the Royal Ulster Constabulary. She has two older siblings: John and Stephen. At the age of three, she emigrated with her family to Australia. The family assumed that her father would be able to join the Australian police on arrival, but, owing to various rules and regulations, he was unable to do so. Woodburne grew up in Frankston, Victoria and attended Forest Hill Primary School, Monterey Secondary College, and Karingal High School.

== Career ==
Woodburne was 22 years old when she decided to become an actress and enrolled in the National Theatre Drama School in Melbourne. She met friend and future Neighbours castmate Janet Andrewartha there and graduated in 1980. Woodburne played Maggie Gordon in The Young Doctors. In 1981, she appeared in the serial drama The Patchwork Hero. She also played Josie in the ABC television miniseries Outbreak of Love, which was adapted from Martin Boyd's novel of the same name. Woodburne starred in the ABC Film 1915 as Dianne Bendetto, alongside Sigrid Thornton, Scott McGregor and Scott Burgess. Woodburne said the fighting is not the only focus of the miniseries, as it shows how the lives of the women were also affected by World War I. Woodburne received a nomination for the Logie Award for Best Support Actress in a Single Drama/Mini Series for her portrayal of Dianne.

Woodburne had a starring role in a major series on every network. Her nine-month stint as Maggie in Nine Network's The Young Doctors was followed by a role in the Network Ten miniseries Sara Dane, and Seven's Cop Shop as Gina Rossi. In 1983, she made the first of three appearances in A Country Practice. She also brief made an appearance in the very first episode of Sons and Daughters, playing the iconic Pat the Rat character Patricia Dunne in flashbacks. In 1985, she guested in an episode of comedy-drama The Fast Lane, which starred her close friend and former flatmate Debra Lawrance. This marked the first time they had worked together.

Woodburne is best known for two long-running soap opera roles. In 1985, Woodburne joined the cast of Prisoner as Julie "Chook" Egbert. Woodburne described Julie as a genius, but said she suppresses her genius so she can blend in. Julie is sent to prison for theft, after taking money to send her dying mother on a holiday. Woodburne was contracted for six months and saw Prisoner as a chance to boost her career. In 1990, she auditioned for the role of Pippa Fletcher in TV soap Home and Away, the producers looking for a recast after original portrayer Vanessa Downing left the series, but she lost out the role to friend Debra Lawrance. Her second long-running role is that of Susan Kennedy in Neighbours, whom she has played since 1994. Woodburne previously played the sister of Alan Fletcher's character in Cop Shop, before they were cast as husband and wife in Neighbours.

In 2005, she was nominated for the Best Female Performance in a Soap Opera award at the international Rose d'Or television festival, but was beaten by fellow British actress Lesley-Anne Down.

In 2014 she became the lead in Night Terrace, a narrative comedy audio series in which she told David Knox of TV Tonight that she plays "basically a female Doctor Who". The series was produced by Splendid Chaps Productions, with the first season released at the end of 2014. It won the Convenors' Award for Excellence in the 2014 Aurealis Awards. A second season was released in February 2016, also starring Woodburne. Both seasons have been licensed for broadcast, with the first commencing on BBC Radio 4 Extra on Sunday 21 April 2019 as part of The 7th Dimension programming block.

Woodburne appeared in a documentary special celebrating Neighbours' 30th anniversary titled Neighbours 30th: The Stars Reunite, which aired in Australia and the UK in March 2015.

On 21 July 2025, it was announced that Woodburne would be a part of a new Australian/UK co-commissioned television series for 5 and Paramount titled Imposter.

== Filmography ==
Acting roles
Year	Title	Role	Notes
1979	Skyways	Marie Newman	Episode: "Tahitian Roulette"
1980–1981	The Young Doctors	Nurse Maggie Gordon	Main cast
1980	Cop Shop	Christie Green	Episodes: "#1.273" and "#1.274"
1981	The Patchwork Hero	Marie	Main cast
1981	Outbreak of Love	Josie Von Flugel	Miniseries
1982	Sons and Daughters	Young Patricia Dunne	Recurring role
1982	Sara Dane	Elizabeth	Miniseries
1982	1915	Dianna Bendetto	Miniseries
1983	A Country Practice	Deborah Koonig	Episodes: "A Woman's Place: Part 1 and 2"
1983	Cop Shop	Gina Rossi	Recurring role
1984	Carson's Law	Fiona Hastings	Recurring role
1984	A Country Practice	Sarah Biggs	Episodes: "Close to the Bone: Part 1 and 2"
1985	Special Squad	Sharon	Episode: "Mates"
1985	The Fast Lane	Ruth	Episode: "The Below Average Samaritan"
1985	The New Adventures of Blinky Bill	Sue	Episode: "Computer Capers"
1985–1986	Prisoner	Julie "Chook" Egbert	Main cast
1987	The Flying Doctors	Elaine Dermody	Episode: "Keeping Up Appearances"
1991	A Country Practice	Kate Bartlett	Episode: "Flying High: Part 1"
1992–1993	The Flood: Who Will Save Our Children?	Lavonda (uncredited)	Television film
1994	Law of the Land	Meg Porter	Episode: "Death Before Dying"
1994–2025	Neighbours	Susan Kennedy	Main cast
2003	Ain't Got No Jazz	Prostitute	Short film
2014	Neighbours vs Zombies	Susan Kennedy	Web series
2014–2016	Night Terrace	Anastasia Black / The Queen	Voice; radio drama
2015	Neighbours 30th: The Stars Reunite	Self	TV documentary
2016	Neighbours: Summer Stories	Susan Kennedy	Web series
2017	Neighbours vs Time Travel	Susan Kennedy	Web series
2025	Imposter	Helen O'Riley	TV mini series
