= Outbreak of Love =

Outbreak of Love may refer to:

- Outbreak of Love (novel), a 1957 novel by Australian writer Martin Boyd
- Outbreak of Love (miniseries), a 1981 Australian miniseries, based on the novel
