= When Blackbirds Sing =

1962 novel by Martin Boyd

- First edition
- Author: Martin Boyd
- Language: English
- Series: Langton Tetralogy
- Publisher: Abelard-Schuman, London
- Publication date: 1962
- Media type: Print Hardback & Paperback
- Pages: 256 pp
- Preceded by: Outbreak of Love
- Followed by: –

When Blackbirds Sing (1962) is the last novel by Australian writer Martin Boyd. It is also the last in the author's "Langton Tetralogy" (which comprises The Cardboard Crown, A Difficult Young Man, Outbreak of Love and When Blackbirds Sing).

== Plot summary ==
During World War I Dominic Langton leaves his wife and child behind in Australia and travels to England to enlist in the British army, attending officers training. While there he comes to know his English family roots for the first time and is initially seduced by the show of class and privilege. But his experiences of killing in the war gradually change his attitudes, and he finally returns to Australia a very changed man.

== Reviews ==
Although the first three Langton novels, published in the 1950s, won high praise in Britain and the USA, the much later When Blackbirds Sing (1962) was then "a critical failure".

Maurice Dunlevy, in a re-examination of the whole tetralogy after it had been re-issued in 1971 by Lansdowne Press, wrote: "Throughout his career Boyd had been wrestling with the conflict between writing a family saga in a form that might be called a schematic fable — the Jamesian novel of total relevance. The sweep required by the saga did not adapt easily to the narrow, more rigid unity of the aesthetically patterned novel and the final attempt to write the, saga as a sequence of self-contained novels was hampered by the necessity to convey the amplitude of the saga in the confines of schematic pattern. "When Blackbirds Sing" seems to be more successful because it throws out almost the whole Langton family and concentrates on the troubled consciousness and feelings of a single member, Dominic Langton, who is the hero not of a saga wedded to the novel of psychological realism, but of the latter alone."

At the centenary of the First World War, Text Publishing re-issued When Blackbirds Sing as "a masterful recreation of the vanished world of 1914, and a moving and powerful testament to the devastation of war".

Reviewing the 2014 release from Text in Southerly Shaun Bell notes: "Difficult to define in terms of genre and uneasily placed in canonical formations, the expected and characteristic nostalgia in Boyd’s treatment of a belated Anglo-Australianism aligned with British colonialism is curiously absent. The finale of four books, the novel conversely sees Boyd at his most politically engaged and focused on his own time...By the end of Boyd’s Langton novels, Dominic becomes something of a tragic figure. Grappling with surges of violent emotion, traumatising visions of the past, homesickness, ennui, and depression, Dominic is once again in danger of being torn apart by his warring emotions."

== See also ==
- 1962 in Australian literature

== Notes ==
Text Publishing re-issued the novel in 2014, at the centenary of the First World War, as part of its Text Classics series with an introduction by Brenda Niall.
