= A Difficult Young Man =

Book by Martin Boyd

- First edition
- Author: Martin Boyd
- Language: English
- Publisher: Cresset Press, London
- Publication date: 1955
- Media type: Print (hardback & paperback)
- Pages: 276 pp
- Preceded by: The Cardboard Crown
- Followed by: Outbreak of Love

A Difficult Young Man (1955) is a novel by Australian writer Martin Boyd. It is the second in the author's "Langton Tetralogy" (which comprises The Cardboard Crown, A Difficult Young Man, Outbreak of Love and When Blackbirds Sing) and it won the ALS Gold Medal in 1957.

== Plot summary ==
The novel continues the story of the Langtons, an Anglo-Australian family based in Melbourne, who have never truly come to terms with their place in Australian society. Like the first novel in the series, this book is narrated by Guy Langton and concerns the younger son Dominic, a man who ideals and actions are considered both eccentric and unacceptable to the Melbourne society of the time.

== Reviews ==
Gordon Stewart in The Argus noted that the author was now in fine company. "Few authors can cope successfully with the family saga type of sage. Miles Franklin and Henry Handel Richardson stand out among the Australians who have made the attempt. To their names can now be added that of Martin Boyd, for the sensitive appeal and literary skill of his latest novel "A Difficult Young Man." He then goes on "The entire work has an air of reality and authenticity which one associates usually only with autobiography."

Dorothy Green, writing in 1965 after the book had been re-issued, stated: "This book is a sharp and timely reminder that other values than commercial success once counted for something in our urban environment, values in no way inferior to, and in some respects superior to those be longing to the European culture with which our own is compared and contrasted. There are unmistakable signs that in this comparatively late novel, Boyd, after sitting agonised for so long on the fence that divides his two worlds has put his foot down on the southern side of it."

== Awards and nominations ==
- 1957 – winner ALS Gold Medal

== See also ==
- Merric Boyd - the article intimates that Merric Boyd might have been a model for the novel's lead character
