= Such Pleasure =

Novel by Australian writer Martin Boyd

- First edition
- Author: Martin Boyd
- Cover artist: Leslie Wood
- Language: English
- Publisher: Cresset Press, London
- Publication date: 1949
- Media type: Print (hardback & paperback)
- Pages: 367 pp
- Preceded by: Lucinda Brayford
- Followed by: The Cardboard Crown

Such Pleasure (1949) is a novel by the Australian writer Martin Boyd.

== Plot summary ==
The novel follows the life of Bridget Malwyn, the illegitimate daughter of an Irish peer and an English governess. Malwyn transforms over the course of the novel from being young and romantic through to an old disillusioned, objectionable old woman who lives in the past.

== Reviews ==
Gladys Hain in The Argus admired the choices made by the author. "Had Martin Boyd been so minded, he might have made of this story a bitter satire, attacking capitalistic society as one which gives to money the power to mould character irretrievably. He has chosen rather to make of his book a wandering, almost meandering sketch of a woman who never recovered from the taste of splendour she got when she lived with her devoted and slightly idiotic parent, an Irish peer, in his castle on the shores of a beautiful lake...Also, had Mr Boyd chosen to dig a little deeper and lay bare the emotions behind the clash between Bridget and her children, he would have written a very powerful novel. Instead, he has chosen, and perhaps wisely, to make his book a comedy of manners, and, as such, it is a highly enjoyable story."

== See also ==
- 1949 in Australian literature
