= Night of the Party =

1938 novel by Martin Boyd

- Author: Martin Boyd
- Language: English
- Genre: Literary fiction
- Publisher: J. M. Dent, London
- Publication date: 1938
- Publication place: Australia
- Media type: Print
- Pages: 319 pp
- Preceded by: The Picnic
- Followed by: Nuns in Jeopardy

Night of the Party (1938) is a novel by Australian author Martin Boyd.

== Plot outline ==
The novel tells the story of painter Gavin Leigh's marriage to Ella Barnes. Starting in the present day (when the novel was written), a chance remark by one of the couple's children takes Ella back to the time when the two met in Cornwall while on holiday. Gavin married for convenience while Ella married for control and now she finds herself with a romantic rival from the initial encounter.

== Critical reception ==
A reviewer in The Sydney Morning Herald called it "A Modern Comedy" and went on: "Martin Boyd has already proved himself a clever and amusing novelist. He has a flair for dialogue, and his manner of using it suggests he has given this important part of novel-writing technique a good deal of thought. His handling of time shifts is smooth and artistically satisfactory...Night of the Party is a compact and stimulating piece of work. Mr. Boyd, unlike many of his contemporaries, is a careful craftsman (he has something more than modern slickness), from whom in the future a novel of significance and literary value might confidently be expected."

In The Telegraph (Brisbane) the reviewer notes that Boyd is "one of the fiction writers who believe in the virtues of direct writing and concise thinking, qualities which make his books eminently readable and a good deal more thought-provoking than many a consciously clever story. Night of the Party is a thoroughly sophisticated study of half a dozen "arty" people whose modernisms are as refreshingly frank as they are clean-minded."

== See also ==
- 1938 in Australian literature

== Notes ==
Austlit notes that this novel was originally written as a play in 1937 but not published in that form.

In her book The Censor's Library: Uncovering the Lost History of Australia's Banned Books, author Nicole Moore notes that the novel was submitted to the Australian censors and "passed" in 1939. She also states, later in the book, "Until the end of the 1930s, only two other Australian books with homosexual content were referred to the LCB [Literature Censorship Board]. Australian expatriate Martin Boyd's slight novel of middle-class British family life, The Night of the Party [sic] (1938), was released. Haydon's report noted 'the author's obvious dislike for some of the conventions which regulate civilised life' and Allen described it as a 'clever sketch of the artistic nature'; neither mentioned the suspiciously camp son of a main character." The other of the two novels mentioned was The Young Desire It (1937) by Seaforth Mackenzie. Haydon and Allen were both members of the Censorship Board.
