= The 7th Dimension =

BBC's regular radio slot for science fiction, fantasy and horror

The 7th Dimension is the BBC's regular radio slot for science fiction, fantasy and horror. It is broadcast on the digital radio station BBC Radio 4 Extra at midnight (GMT in winter, BST in summer) on Saturdays and Sundays, and repeated at 4 p.m. on each weekend day. The original and still frequent host is Nicholas Briggs, but other hosts include Toby Hadoke, Natalie Haynes and Nicola Walker. Most of the programs are full cast dramatizations and the remainder are book readings. The 7th Dimension has hosted both standalone stories and serials. Most of the programs are drawn from the BBC's extensive archives and have previously been aired on other BBC stations. A few 7th Dimension shows are new commissions, such as Undone, The Spaceship and Planet B, or new acquisitions like Night Terrace. It also sometimes uses Big Finish Productions of Doctor Who.

Originally aired on BBC 7, it retained the 7 in the name when BBC 7 became BBC Radio 4 Extra.
