= The Picnic (novel) =

1937 novel by Martin Boyd

- Title page for The Picnic (1937)
- Author: Martin Boyd
- Language: English
- Genre: Literary fiction
- Publisher: J. M. Dent, London
- Publication date: 1937
- Publication place: Australia
- Media type: Print
- Pages: 314 pp
- Preceded by: The Painted Princess
- Followed by: Night of the Party

The Picnic (1937) is a novel by Australian author Martin Boyd.

== Plot outline ==
Australian Matty Westlake is descended from an old English family and when her husband dies she is determined to take her sons, Christopher and Wilfred, back to England to introduce them to their forebears. The English side of the family is completely ignorant of Australian ways and the Australians also find themselves at odds with the English.

== Critical reception ==
A reviewer in The Weekly Times found the novel "humorous" and went on: "Here we have a fine book from the pen of an Australian born author. Mr Boyd is a really witty writer. His dialogue is clever and entertaining. He has a gift for characterisation and he can evoke an atmosphere."

In The Australian Women's Weekly the reviewer appears unaware that Boyd is even Australian, but praises him nevertheless: "Mr. Boyd writes with fluency and a sure touch. He has an excellent sense of characterisation, and both his Australian and his English readers should be interested in his conclusions, even if they do not always agree with some of his basic ideas."

== See also ==
- 1937 in Australian literature
