= Sam Neill =

New Zealand actor (1947–2026)

Sir Sam Neill KNZM OBE
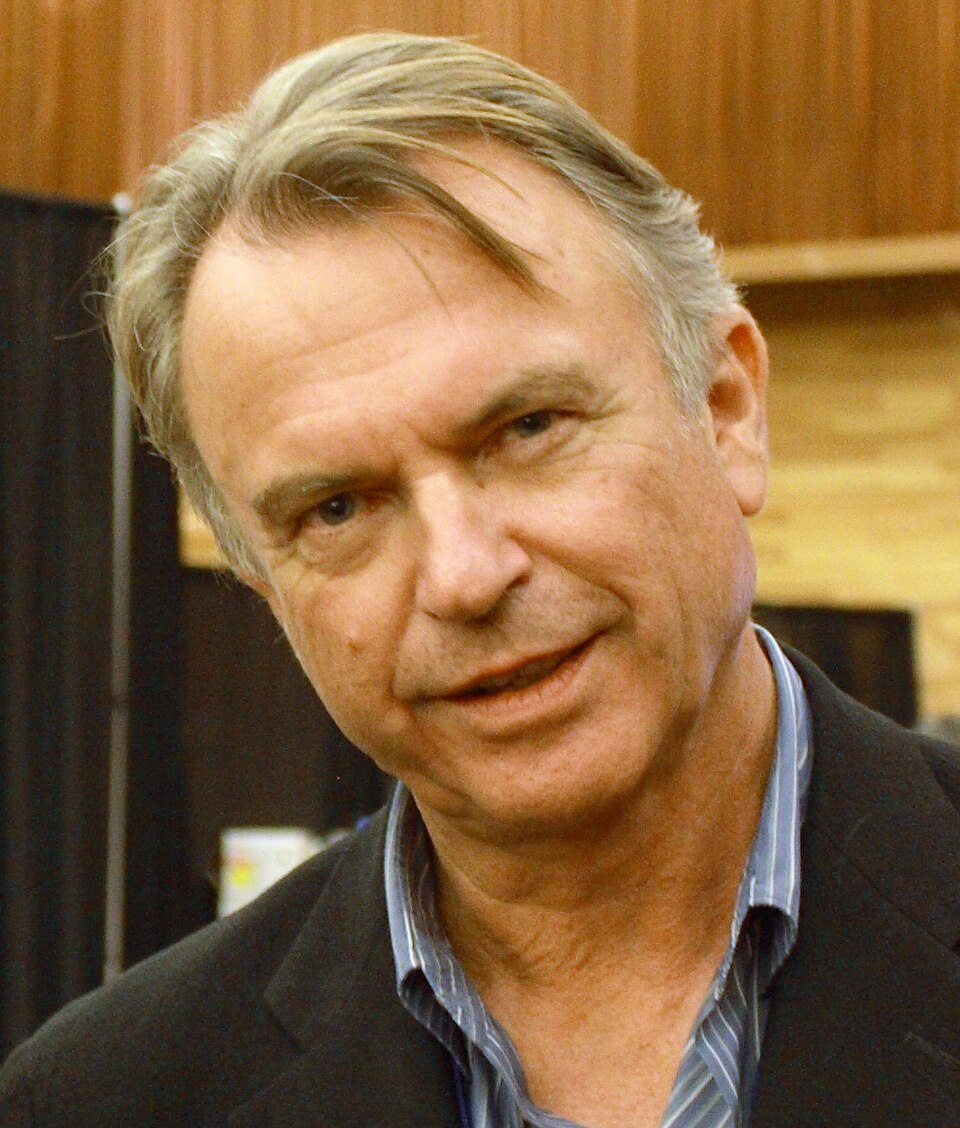
- Neill in 2010
- Born: Nigel John Dermot Neill; 14 September 1947; Omagh, County Tyrone, Northern Ireland
- Died: 13 July 2026 (aged 78); Sydney, New South Wales, Australia
- Citizenship: New Zealand; UK; Ireland
- Education: University of Canterbury (attended); Victoria University of Wellington (BA)
- Occupation: Actor
- Years active: 1969–2026
- Works: Full list
- Spouse: Noriko Watanabe (m. 1989; sep. 2017)
- Children: 4

Sir Nigel John Dermot "Sam" Neill (14 September 1947 – 13 July 2026) was a New Zealand actor. Known as a leading man in film and television, he received nominations for three Primetime Emmy Awards and three Golden Globe Awards. He was appointed an Officer of the Order of the British Empire in the 1991 Queen's Birthday Honours for services as an actor.

Born in Northern Ireland to an English mother and a New Zealand father, Neill moved to Christchurch with his family in 1954. He first achieved recognition with his appearance in the film Sleeping Dogs (1977), followed by leading roles in: My Brilliant Career (1979), The Final Conflict, Possession (both 1981), Evil Angels (1988), Dead Calm (1989), Death in Brunswick, The Hunt for Red October (both 1990), Until the End of the World (1991), The Piano (1993), In the Mouth of Madness (1994), Restoration (1995), Event Horizon (1997), The Dish (2000) and Hunt for the Wilderpeople (2016). He came to international prominence as Dr Alan Grant in Jurassic Park (1993), a role he reprised in Jurassic Park III (2001) and Jurassic World Dominion (2022).

On television, Neill portrayed Merlin in the miniseries Merlin (1998) and Merlin's Apprentice (2006), the former of which earned him nominations for the Primetime Emmy Award and the Golden Globe Award. He was also nominated for a Golden Globe for playing historic spy Sidney Reilly in Reilly, Ace of Spies (1983) and a British officer during World War II in One Against the Wind (1991). In addition, he played Thomas Wolsey in The Tudors (2007) and Major Chester Campbell in Peaky Blinders (2013–2014).

== Early life, education and early theatre work ==
Nigel John Dermot Neill was born on 14 September 1947 in Omagh, County Tyrone, Northern Ireland, to an English mother, Priscilla Beatrice Ingham, and a New Zealand father, Dermot Neill. As a result, he held three documented citizenships: Irish, British, and New Zealand. His great-grandfather, Percival "Percy" Neill, the son of a wine merchant who imported wine from France, left Belfast for Australia, where he joined a firm of merchants in Melbourne, eventually moving to New Zealand and settling in Dunedin in 1863. At the time of Neill's birth, his father was stationed in Northern Ireland, serving as an officer with the Royal Irish Fusiliers. Dermot Neill's family owned Neill and Company, later part of the listed hospitality group Wilson Neill.

In 1954, the Neill family moved to New Zealand and settled in the Christchurch suburb of Cashmere. Neill attended Cashmere Primary School and Medbury School, a private preparatory school. After a year, his parents and younger sister, Juliet, moved south to his father's home city of Dunedin. They lived at Macandrew Bay, where they were free to roam during the holidays. As a child, Neill had a stammer; during a 2004 interview on the Australian talk show Enough Rope, Andrew Denton briefly discussed this stutter, and Neill recalled how deeply it had affected him and that he often found himself "hoping that people wouldn't talk to [him]" so he would not have to answer, adding "I kind of outgrew it [but] you can still detect me as a stammerer."

He began calling himself "Sam" at school because several other boys were named Nigel, and because he felt the name Nigel was "a little effete for... a New Zealand playground". From 1961, he was a boarding pupil at Christ's College, an Anglican boys' boarding and day school in Christchurch.

He attended the University of Canterbury in Christchurch but was uncertain about a career and decided not to follow his father into the army or the family firm. He considered law, but he failed all four units in his first year. He appeared in several university productions, including playing Theseus in 1969 in A Midsummer Night's Dream, directed by Ngaio Marsh for the Canterbury University Drama Society.

Neill acted in the 1969 production by Mervyn Thompson of Marat/Sade. When it transferred to Wellington's Downstage Theatre at the end of 1969 and another actor withdrew, Neill replaced him as Jacques Roux. He described the experience as "the time of [his] life" and observed that the arts were "part of the fabric of the city" unlike in Christchurch or Dunedin. Having relocated to Wellington, he transferred to Victoria University of Wellington for a year, graduating from Victoria University with a bachelor's degree in English literature in 1970. He played Macbeth in a university production directed by Phillip Mann. He then joined Downstage as a professional actor as Pentheus in Euripides' The Bacchae, earning NZ$35 per week plus leftover food from the kitchen after the audience dinner.

== Screen career ==
=== 1971–1979: Early work in New Zealand ===
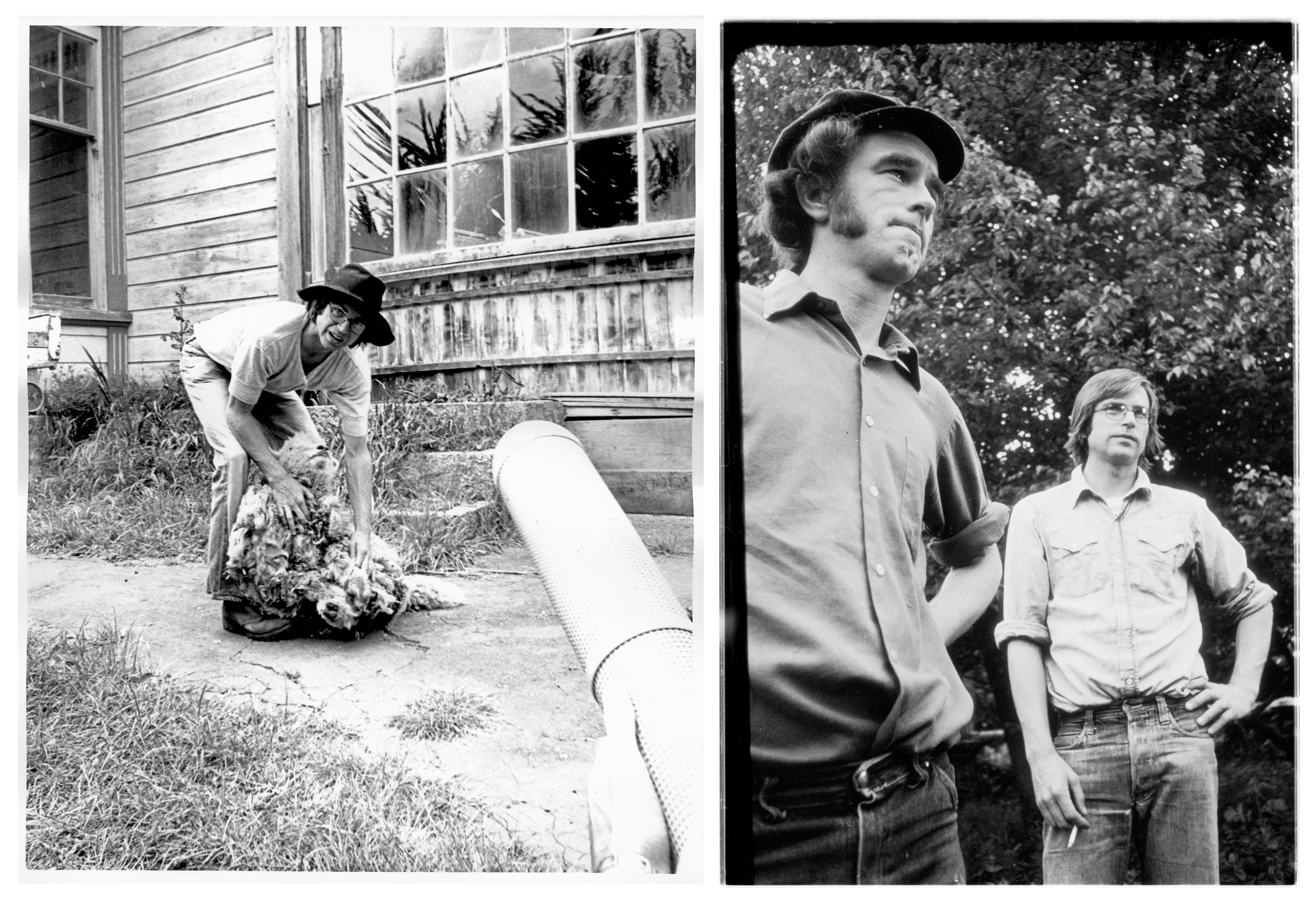
Stills from Landfall (1974)

Neill's first film was The City of No (1971), a New Zealand television film. He followed it with a short film, The Water Cycle (1972) and the television film Hunt's Duffer (1973). Neill wrote and directed films for the New Zealand National Film Unit, including Phone (1974), Flare - A Ski Trip (1977), and Architect Athfield (1977). He also appeared in Landfall (1975). His breakthrough performance in New Zealand was Sleeping Dogs (1977), the first local film to be widely screened overseas.

Neill moved to Australia, where he had a guest role in the drama TV show The Sullivans. He was the romantic male lead in My Brilliant Career (1979), opposite Judy Davis, which achieved international success. He appeared in several Australian films that were less widely seen, including The Journalist (1979), Just Out of Reach (1979) and Attack Force Z (1981), and in television productions such as Young Ramsay and Lucinda Brayford.

=== 1981–1989: Transition to Hollywood ===
In 1981, Neill won his first major international role as Damien Thorn in The Final Conflict. In the same year, he played a leading role in Andrzej Żuławski's cult film Possession.

The 1982 adaptation of Ivanhoe made Neill a local celebrity in Sweden, where the film has been broadcast on SVT every New Year's Day for four decades.

He was one of the leading candidates to succeed Roger Moore as James Bond, but the role ultimately went to Timothy Dalton. Among his Australian roles was Michael Chamberlain in Evil Angels (1988) (released as A Cry in the Dark outside Australia and New Zealand), a film about the case of Azaria Chamberlain.

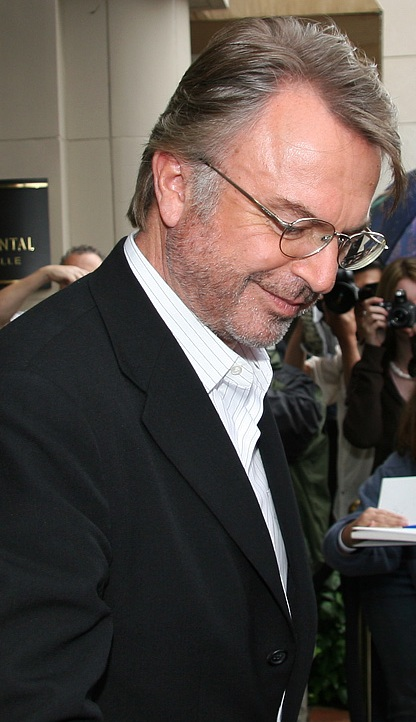
Neill at the 2008 Toronto International Film Festival

Neill played heroes and occasional villains in a succession of film and television dramas and comedies. In the UK, he gained early fame and a Golden Globe nomination for portraying Sidney Reilly in the miniseries Reilly, Ace of Spies (1983). An early American starring role was in Amerika (1987), in which he played a senior KGB officer overseeing the occupation and division of a defeated United States. His leading and co-starring roles in films included Dead Calm (1989), opposite Nicole Kidman, and the two-part historical epic La Révolution française (1989), in which he portrayed the Marquis de Lafayette.

=== 1990–1999: Leading man roles ===
Neill solidified his leading-man status with: The Hunt for Red October (1990), Death in Brunswick (1990) (in which he appeared with old friend John Clarke), Jurassic Park (1993), Sirens (1994), The Jungle Book (1994), John Carpenter's In the Mouth of Madness (1995), Event Horizon (1997), Bicentennial Man (1999), the comedy The Dish (2000) and Jurassic Park III (2001). He continued to act in New Zealand films, including: Jane Campion's The Piano (1993), Perfect Strangers (2003), Under the Mountain (2009) and Taika Waititi's Hunt for the Wilderpeople (2016).

He returned to directing with the documentary Cinema of Unease: A Personal Journey by Sam Neill (1995), which he wrote and directed with Judy Rymer.

In 1993, Neill co-starred with Anne Archer in Question of Faith, an independent drama based on a true story. In 2000, he voiced Sam Sawnoff in The Magic Pudding. In 2001, he hosted and narrated the BBC documentary series Space (titled Hyperspace in the United States). He portrayed the titular character in the 1998 miniseries Merlin and later reprised the role in Merlin's Apprentice (2006).

=== 2000–2025: Television work and final roles ===
Neill starred in the historical drama TV series The Tudors as Cardinal Thomas Wolsey. "I have to say I really enjoyed making The Tudors", he said, "It was six months with a character that I found immensely intriguing, with a cast that I liked very much and with a story I found very compelling. It has elements that are hard to beat: revenge and betrayal, lust and treason, all the things that make for good stories."

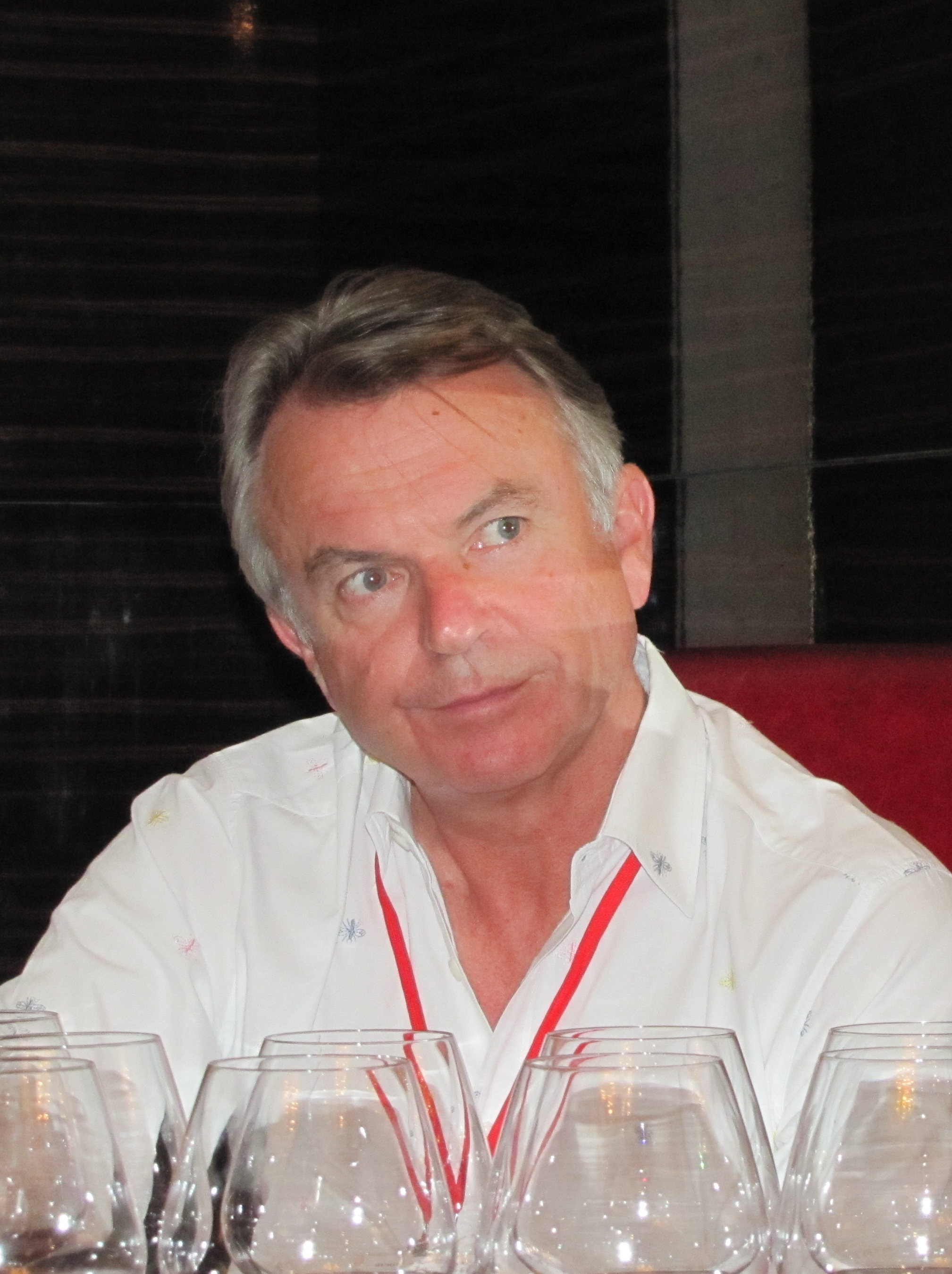
Neill at Burghound Asia in Singapore in 2011

He acted in the short-lived Fox TV series Alcatraz (2012) as Emerson Hauser. He played Otto Luger in the fantasy adventure film The Adventurer: The Curse of the Midas Box (2014). He appeared in Peaky Blinders as Chief Inspector Chester Campbell, a corrupt and sadistic policeman sent by Winston Churchill to clean up post–World War I Birmingham. In the 2015 BBC miniseries And Then There Were None, based on Agatha Christie's novel, he played General John MacArthur.

In 2016, Neill starred in the New Zealand–made film Hunt for the Wilderpeople and the ITV miniseries Tutankhamun. In 2017, he appeared in Thor: Ragnarok, portraying an actor playing Odin. He reprised the same meta‑role in Thor: Love and Thunder in 2022.

In 2018, Neill portrayed Mr. McGregor and voiced Tommy Brock in Peter Rabbit. In 2019, he was initially cast as Denis Goldberg in Escape from Pretoria, but the role was later recast. He reprised his role as Dr Alan Grant in Jurassic World Dominion, released in 2022.

In 2022, Neill appeared in the Foxtel legal drama The Twelve as Brett Colby. When the series was renewed for a second season, he was the only returning cast member. In September 2024, it was announced that The Twelve had been renewed for a third season, with Neill again returning. He was nominated for a 2025 AACTA Award for his role in The Twelve.

In June 2024, Neill was named in the cast for the Netflix drama Untamed. In April 2025, his casting in Godzilla x Kong: Supernova was announced. In May 2025, Neill was seen filming in the Philippines for the romantic comedy The Last Resort. He will appear posthumously in the live-action adaptation of The Legend of Zelda video game series slated for a 2027 release.

== Acting credits and accolades ==
Awards and nominations received by Sam Neill
Year	Organisations	Category	Nominated work	Result	Ref.
1985	Golden Globes Awards	Best Actor – Miniseries or Television Film	Reilly: Ace of Spies	Nominated	
1989	AFI Awards	Best Actor in a Leading Role	Evil Angels / A Cry in the Dark	Won	
1991	AFI Awards	Best Actor in a Leading Role	Death in Brunswick	Nominated	
1992	Golden Globes Awards	Best Actor – Miniseries or Television Film	One Against the Wind	Nominated	
1993	AFI Awards	Best Actor in a Supporting Role	The Piano	Nominated	
1993	American Television Awards	Best Actor in a Miniseries	Family Pictures	Nominated	
1993	Saturn Awards	Best Supporting Actor	Memoirs of an Invisible Man	Nominated	
1998	Online Film & Television Awards	Best Actor in a Motion Picture or Miniseries	Merlin	Nominated	
1998	Primetime Emmy Awards	Outstanding Lead Actor in a Miniseries or a Movie	Merlin	Nominated	
1998	Fangoria Chainsaw Awards	Best Actor	Event Horizon	Nominated	
1999	Golden Globes Awards	Best Actor – Miniseries or Television Film	Merlin	Nominated	
1999	Blockbuster Entertainment Awards	Favourite Supporting Actor – Drama/Romance	The Horse Whisperer	Nominated	
2000	AFI Awards	Best Actor in a Supporting Role	My Mother Frank	Nominated	
2001	Ft. Lauderdale International Film Festival	Best Actor	The Zookeeper	Won	
2001	Film Critics Circle of Australia Awards	Best Actor – Male	The Dish	Nominated	
2004	AFI Awards	Best Telefeature or Mini-Series	The Brush-Off	Nominated	
2004	AFI Awards	Best Direction in Television	The Brush-Off	Nominated	
2004	AFI Awards	Best Leading Actor in a Television Drama or Comedy	Jessica	Nominated	
2005	Logie Awards	TV Week Silver Logie For Most Outstanding Actor	Jessica	Won	
2005	Logie Awards	Most Outstanding Mini-Series / Telemovie	The Brush-Off	Nominated	
2005	New Zealand Screen Awards	Performance by an Actor in a Leading Role	Perfect Strangers	Nominated	
2005	Film Critics Circle of Australia Awards	Best Actor in a Supporting Role	Little Fish	Nominated	
2006	Saturn Awards	Best Supporting Actor on Television	The Triangle	Nominated	
2008	Gemini Awards	Best Supporting Actor in a Dramatic Series	The Tudors	Nominated	
2008	Monte-Carlo TV Festival	Outstanding Actor – Drama Series	The Tudors	Nominated	
2009	Qantas Film and Television Awards	Best Lead Actor in a Feature Film	Dean Spanley	Nominated	
2010	Qantas Film and Television Awards	Best Supporting Actor in a Feature Film	Under the Mountain	Nominated	
2010	New Zealand Screen Awards	Best New Zealand Export		Won	
2012	Film Critics Circle of Australia Awards	Best Actor – Supporting Role	The Hunter	Nominated	
2012	AACTA Awards	Best Supporting Actor	The Hunter	Nominated	
2016	AACTA Awards	Best Supporting Actor	The Daughter	Nominated	
2016	Logie Awards	Most Outstanding Actor	House of Hancock	Nominated	
2016	Australian Movie Convention	AIMC Lifetime Achievement Award		Won	
2016	Film Club's The Lost Weekend Awards	Best Supporting Actor	Hunt for the Wilderpeople	Won	
2017	Rialto Channel New Zealand Film Awards	Best Supporting Actor	Hunt for the Wilderpeople	Won	
2017	NCFCA Awards	Best Supporting Actor	Hunt for the Wilderpeople	Nominated	
2017	Primetime Emmy Awards	Outstanding Narrator	New Zealand: Earth's Mythical Islands	Nominated	
2017	Film Critics Circle of Australia Awards	Best Actor – Supporting Role	The Daughter	Nominated	
2017	AFCA Awards	Best Supporting Actor	The Daughter	Won	
2019	AFCA Awards	Best Supporting Actor	Sweet Country	Won	
2019	Film Critics Circle of Australia Awards	Best Actor – Supporting Role	Sweet Country	Nominated	
2019	New Zealand Television Awards	Best Presenter: Entertainment	The Pacific: In The Wake of Captain Cook with Sam Neill	Nominated	
2019	AACTA Awards	Longford Lyell Award		Won	
2019	The Equity Ensemble Awards	Equity New Zealand Lifetime Achievement Award		Won	
2019	Sitges – Catalonian International Film Festival	Grand Honorary Award		Won	
2020	AFCA Awards	Best Supporting Actor	Ride Like a Girl	Nominated	
2020	AACTA Awards	Best Lead Actor	Rams	Nominated	
2022	AACTA Awards	Best Lead Actor In A Drama	The Twelve	Nominated	
2023	Logie Awards	Most Outstanding Actor	The Twelve	Nominated	
2023	Logie Awards	TV Week Silver Logie For Most Popular Actor	The Twelve	Won	
2025	AACTA Awards	Best Lead Actor In A Drama	The Twelve	Nominated	
2025	Logie Awards	Best Lead Actor In A Drama	The Twelve	Won	
2026	Logie Awards	Best Lead Actor In A Drama	The Twelve: Cape Rock Killer	Won	

== Reputation and honours ==
Neill's career, which spanned over five decades, involved leading roles in both independent films and blockbusters. Considered an "international leading man", he was regarded as one of the most versatile actors of his generation. He was the recipient of the AACTA Award for Best Actor in a Leading Role, the Longford Lyell Award, the New Zealand Film Award, and the Logie Award for Most Outstanding Actor. He also received three Golden Globe and two Primetime Emmy Award nominations. He won the Silver Logie for Most Popular Actor at the 2023 Logies.

Neill was appointed an Officer of the Order of the British Empire (OBE) in the 1991 Queen's Birthday Honours, for services as an actor. In the 2007 New Year Honours, he was appointed a Distinguished Companion of the New Zealand Order of Merit (DCNZM). When knighthoods were returned to the New Zealand royal honours system in 2009, those with DCNZM or higher honours were given the option of converting them into knighthoods. Neill chose not to do this at the time, saying the title of Sir was "just far too grand, by far". However, in June 2022, he accepted redesignation as a Knight Companion of the New Zealand Order of Merit (KNZM).

Neill was awarded an honorary Doctor of Letters (Litt.D.) degree by the University of Canterbury in 2002. He was awarded the 2019 Equity New Zealand lifetime achievement award, celebrating his distinguished performance career as well as his leadership and mentoring of others in the acting industry. in 2020, he received an Arts Foundation of New Zealand Icon Award, an honour limited to 20 living recipients at any one time.

In 2026, shortly before his death, Neill was awarded as Fellow of New Zealand Winegrowers in recognition for his contribution to the country’s wine industry and promoting New Zealand wine.

In August 2026, he was posthumously awarded Best Lead Actor in a Drama at the 2026 Logie Awards for his role as Brett Colby in the legal thriller The Twelve: Cape Rock Killer. The award was accepted on his behalf by his friend and fellow actor Heather Mitchell. During the same ceremony, Neill was honoured with a dedicated tribute in the "In Memoriam" segment; the tribute was introduced by Mitchell and featured a musical performance of Crowded House's "Don't Dream It's Over" by Katie Noonan and Andrea Lam.

== Personal life ==
In his early twenties, Neill fathered a son who was placed for adoption. They were reunited in 1994. In 1980, Neill had a son with the actress Lisa Harrow, whom he had met while filming The Final Conflict.

He married makeup artist Noriko Watanabe in 1989; they had a daughter together. He also adopted Watanabe's daughter from her first marriage. They separated in 2017. Neill dated the Australian political journalist Laura Tingle from 2018 to 2021. As of 2023, he had eight grandchildren.

Neill lived in Alexandra, in New Zealand's Central Otago region, and owned a winery called Two Paddocks, consisting of a vineyard at Gibbston and two near Alexandra, all within the Central Otago wine region. His avocation was running Two Paddocks. "I'd like the vineyard to support me but I'm afraid it is the other way round. It is not a very economic business", said Neill, adding, "It is a ridiculously time- and money-consuming business. I would not do it if it was not so satisfying and fun, and it gets me pissed once in a while." He enjoyed sharing his farm exploits on social media. He named his farm animals after film industry colleagues.

He wrote a memoir, Did I Ever Tell You This?, published in March 2023.

=== Politics ===
In 2016, Neill criticised the policies of New South Wales premier Mike Baird on lockout laws and the ban on greyhound racing. He spoke positively about the premiership of Jacinda Ardern. He was a member of the Equity New Zealand trade union from 1979 until his death in 2026.

In 2025, New Zealand resources minister Shane Jones called Neill "wrong and anti-Kiwi" for his opposition to an open-cast gold mine proposed near Cromwell. Neill supported the local advocacy group Sustainable Tarras, which organised events against the mining proposal. He described Santana Minerals' proposal as "ruinous for the region". Following his death, Neill's friend Roger Donaldson said that the online abuse and hostility Neill received, starting with Jones's comments, "took its toll" on Neill and may have "undermined his health in the very end".

=== Health and death ===
In March 2023, Neill revealed that he had been undergoing chemotherapy since March 2022 after being diagnosed with stage 3 angioimmunoblastic T-cell lymphoma, a type of blood cancer, following swollen glands that were first noticed during publicity for Jurassic World Dominion. He stated that the cancer was in remission but that he would require monthly chemotherapy for the rest of his life. in April 2026, Neill said that after his chemotherapy had stopped working, he underwent CAR T-cell therapy as part of an Australian clinical trial. He also said that a recent scan showed no cancer in his body and advocated wider access to the treatment for blood cancer patients in Australia and New Zealand.

Neill died from pneumonia in Sydney, Australia, on 13 July 2026 aged 78. Many colleagues from the film industry paid tribute to him.

Neill was cremated and his ashes were scattered on his farm in New Zealand.

== Published works ==
Year	Title	Publisher	Pages	Notes
2023	Did I Ever Tell You This? A Memoir	Melbourne: The Text Publishing Company London: Michael Joseph Ltd.	400	Booktopia's Top 10 Favourite Books, 2024; ISBN 9781922790309 (Melbourne edition); ISBN 9780241648988 (London edition)
2024	Did I Ever Tell You This? A Memoir (fully revised and updated with new writing)	Melbourne: The Text Publishing Company London: Michael Joseph Ltd.	432	

== See also ==
- List of celebrities who own wineries and vineyards
