= Lucinda Brayford =

1946 novel by Martin Boyd

- 1948 US edition (publ. E.P. Dutton)
- Author: Martin Boyd
- Language: English
- Publisher: Cresset Press (UK)
- Publication date: 1946
- Publication place: Australia
- Media type: Print (hardback & paperback)
- Pages: 546 pp
- Preceded by: Nuns in Jeopardy
- Followed by: Such Pleasure

Lucinda Brayford (1946) is a novel by Australian author Martin Boyd.

== Plot summary ==
This is the story of a beautiful woman set mainly in Melbourne, Victoria and England, from the early 1900s to the Second World War.

Lucinda Vane is born into a wealthy Melbourne family. Nellie Melba appears in the novel, singing at a garden party thrown by Lucinda's mother, and is described as having the "loveliest voice in the world". Lucinda spurns the love of a distinguished family friend, Tony Duff, to marry the dashing aide-de-camp to the Governor, Hugo Brayford. Lucinda's life of ease is replaced by hardship when Hugo takes her to England just before the First World War. She then realises that her husband has married her for her money, and he has a mistress.

== Adaptations ==
Lucinda Brayford
- Based on: Lucinda Brayford by Martin Boyd
- Written by: Cliff Green
- Directed by: John Gauci
- Starring: Wendy Hughes; Sam Neill
- Country of origin: Australia
- Original language: English
- No. of episodes: 4 x 1 hour

Production
- Producer: John Gauci

Original release
- Network: ABC
- Release: 15 June 1980

This novel was adapted for a television mini-series in 1980, produced by Oscar Whitbread and directed by John Gauci, from a screenplay by Cliff Green, featuring Wendy Hughes as Lucinda, and Sam Neill as Tony Duff. BBC Radio broadcast a dramatisation by Elspeth Sandys in 2005, 2020, and 2025.

=== Cast ===
- Wendy Hughes as Lucinda Brayford
- Sam Neill as Tony Duff
- Barry Quin as Hugo Brayford
- Carol Burns as Carol Burns
- Edmund Pegge at Pat Lafranc
