= The Madeleine Heritage =

Book by Martin Boyd

- Author: Martin Boyd
- Language: English
- Genre: novel
- Publisher: Bobbs-Merrill, USA
- Publication date: 1928
- Publication place: Australia
- Media type: Print (hardback and paperback)
- Pages: 404
- Preceded by: Bangrane: a memoir
- Followed by: Dearest Idol

The Madeleine Heritage (1928) (also known as The Montforts) is a novel by Australian author Martin Boyd. It won the ALS Gold Medal in 1928.

== Plot summary ==
The novel tells the story of the "Montford" family who settled in Melbourne before the Victorian gold rush of the 1850s. The story commences with the arrival of the Montfords on the brig Chamois in Hobson's Bay near the new settlement of Port Phillip. Henry Montford, a young barrister from Lincolns Inn, has transported his family to the new colony to start a new life. Henry's brother Simon is already living in the colony, and the novel follows the reunion of the two families and their rise through the social ranks during the 1850s, and on to the turn of the century.

== Notes ==
- Austlit notes that the working title for the novel was Great Grandmother Madeleine.
- The novel is believed to be a thinly disguised history of a major Victorian family, with one reviewer in 1933 stating: "Those familiar with the social, legal and pastoral history of this State will immediately recognise in the Montfords and their connections another and real family, whose roots were planted deep in our soil. Forgotten by the present generation, these people and their type, have left their own enduring mark upon the spiritual and material characteristics of our country."

== Reviews ==
- A reviewer in The Age noted that "Australian perceptions failed to comprehend the genuine merit of this book" when it was first published. The reviewer then went on to conclude "Mr. Boyd has written, in the opinion of the present writer, a masterpiece of which can be said, in conclusion, that it is still waiting for its rightful recognition despite the fact that its first English edition was published in 1928."
- Writing on the theme of "The Englishman in Australia" in 1929 Nettie Palmer stated that "In this book the Englishman-in-Australia theme was marked to the point of nervous self-consciousness in almost every page. The author showed his English family as feeling uncomfortably English in the colonies, but uncomfortably 'colonial' when they visited England, unhappily, rootless even down to the present. It made a problem novel of a kind. But when the publishers arranged for an American edition they felt, perhaps, that such a theme was too parochial, and decided to stress the personality of that eighteenth century Frenchwoman who had been grafted on to the family tree before the book opened."

== Awards and nominations ==
- 1928 winner ALS Gold Medal
