= Outbreak of Love (miniseries) =

- Based on: novel by Martin Boyd
- Written by: Howard Griffiths
- Directed by: Oscar Whitbread
- Starring: Rowena Wallace; Tony Bonner; Sigrid Thornton
- Country of origin: Australia
- Original language: English
- No. of episodes: 3 x 1 hour

Production
- Producer: Oscar Whitbread

Original release
- Network: ABC
- Release: 15 March 1981 – 1981

Outbreak of Love is a 1981 Australian miniseries about Melbourne society just before World War I.

== Cast ==
- Rowena Wallace as Diana Von Flugel
- Tony Bonner as Russell Lockwood
- Sigrid Thornton as Anthea Langton
- Jackie Woodburne as Josie Von Flugel
- Lewis Fitz-Gerald as Captain John Wickham
- Val Lehman as Mrs Montaubyn
- John Frawley
