= Nuns in Jeopardy =

1940 novel by Martin Boyd

- Author: Martin Boyd
- Language: English
- Publisher: J. M. Dent, London
- Publication date: 1940
- Media type: Print (hardback & paperback)
- Pages: 314 pp
- Preceded by: Night of the Party
- Followed by: Lucinda Brayford

Nuns in Jeopardy (1940) is a novel by Australian writer Martin Boyd.

== Plot summary ==
A ship founders in a storm at sea and a number of survivors, including a group of Anglo-Catholic nuns, find themselves washed up on an almost deserted island. The only thing they find on the island is an empty well-stocked bungalow.

== Reviews ==
A reviewer in The Telegraph (Brisbane) found fault with some aspects of the novel but admired the craft of the author. "To put a number of women, removed A from the protection of their ecclesiastical surroundings into circumstances where even the ordinary conventions are lowered, and where temptation is deliberately placed before some of them, is not a subject worthy of any writer's steel. If the conventions are to be attacked it should be on an open ground where the contest is fair. Mr. Boyd is better employed in his character drawing, though the devices he has employed in the book make his pictures sometimes sound artificial if not fantastic. But there is plenty of insight and sympathy behind his writing and the self realisation of several of the characters is brought out with skill and strength. "

== See also ==
- 1940 in Australian literature
