= Dearest Idol =

Book by Martin Boyd

- Author: Martin Boyd
- Language: English
- Genre: Fiction
- Publisher: Bobbs-Merrill, Indiana, USA
- Publication date: 1929
- Publication place: Australia
- Media type: Print
- Pages: 284 pp
- Preceded by: The Madeleine Heritage
- Followed by: Scandal of Spring

Dearest Idol (1929) is a novel by Australian writer Martin Boyd. It was published under the author's pseudonym "Walter Beckett".

== Story outline ==
The novel is set in Europe and follows the story of a 19-year-old boy named Tony Dawson (called "Boysie" by his by Aunt Matilda). Tony and Matilda have moved to London, and Tony has left school and gone to work in a well-known bank. While working there he meets Boris and the novel explores the friendship that develops between them.

== Critical reception ==
In her PhD thesis titled "Deconstructing Martin Boyd : Homosocial Desire and the Transgressive Aesthetic", Jenny Blain notes in her introduction that "the novel's predominant focus [is] on narcissism, egoism and homosexual possibility. Tony is a monster of vanity and self-love; he also has an infantile fixation on adulation and power."

== See also ==
- 1929 in Australian literature

== Notes ==
Martin Boyd was not acknowledged as the author of this book until this was unearthed in 1977 by Brenda Niall of Monash University and Terence O'Neill of Melbourne University.
