= The Cardboard Crown =

1952 novel by Martin Boyd

- First edition
- Author: Martin Boyd
- Cover artist: Leslie Wood
- Language: English
- Series: Langton Tetralogy
- Publisher: Cresset Press, London
- Publication date: 1952
- Media type: Print (hardback & paperback)
- Pages: 256 pp
- Preceded by: Such Pleasure
- Followed by: A Difficult Young Man

The Cardboard Crown (1952) is a novel by Australian writer Martin Boyd. It is the first in the author's "Langton Tetralogy" (which comprises The Cardboard Crown, A Difficult Young Man, Outbreak of Love and When Blackbirds Sing).

== Plot summary ==
The novel follows the story of Alice Langton, as told by her grandson Guy de Teba Langton, who pieces the story together from her diaries and family gossip. Alice is trapped in a life where her happiness is a secondary consideration among the rest of the family, who make continual demands on her money. Alice moves constantly between her homes in Australia and Europe, always longing for the home she does not inhabit.

== Reviews ==
Geoffrey Hutton in The Argus noted that the author was writing a family saga of wealth and influence in Melbourne with a difference. "The prod-nosed social investigators may find some interesting sidelights here on the gilded life of the governing class in the 70's or the early affluence of East St Kilda before the parvenus flooded into Toorak. But Mr Boyd's only real interest is in the contrasting strains which appear in his oddly-mixed family and in the interaction between human frailty and unearned wealth.."

Gillian Dooley, writing in 2004 after the book had been re-issued, stated: "Boyd's subject matter is no doubt the principal reason for his neglect. By any standards, his prose is strong and luminous and his novels are beautifully crafted and immensely readable. But the late twentieth century had little patience with the scandals and vicissitudes of Anglo-Australian aristocratic families, with no apparent connections with convicts, sealers or whalers, or the indigenous people. Boyd was admittedly something of a good old-fashioned snob."

== See also ==
- 1952 in Australian literature

== Notes ==
Text Publishing re-issued the novel in 2012 as part of its Text Classics series with an introduction by Brenda Niall.
