= The Lemon Farm =

1935 novel by Martin Boyd

- Book cover for The Lemon Farm (1973 edition)
- Author: Martin Boyd
- Language: English
- Genre: Literary fiction
- Publisher: J. M. Dent, London
- Publication date: 1935
- Publication place: Australia
- Media type: Print
- Pages: 333 pp
- Preceded by: Scandal of Spring
- Followed by: The Painted Princess

The Lemon Farm (1935) is a novel by Australian author Martin Boyd.

== Plot outline ==
In a small English seaside village, Lady Davina Chelgrove leaves her husband Nigel for another, younger man. The affair proceeds towards a tragic ending. The "Lemon Farm" of the title is located in the Mediterranean and is the ideal that the two lovers aspire towards.

== Critical reception ==
A reviewer in The Sydney Morning Herald found a lot to like with the novel: "Well constructed and well written The Lemon Farm is probably the most successful novel that Mr Boyd has yet written. His portrait of Davina herself is not only attractive but firmly and consistently modelled."

In The Argus the reviewer found this a better novel that the author's previous: "The Lemon Farm is written with a firm assured touch yet with subtlety and delicacy. In the main it is tragi-comedy though it deepens into tragedy."

== See also ==
- 1935 in Australian literature
