= Scandal of Spring =

1934 novel by Martin Boyd

- Author: Martin Boyd
- Language: English
- Genre: Fiction
- Publisher: J. M. Dent, London
- Publication date: 1934
- Publication place: Australia
- Media type: Print
- Pages: 245 pp
- Preceded by: Dearest Idol
- Followed by: The Lemon Farm

Scandal of Spring (1934) is a novel by Australian writer Martin Boyd.

== Story outline ==
Set in a small English seaside village, the novel follows the story of the youth John Vazetti with lives with his parents in a cottage with tearooms attached. John falls in love with a young woman, Madge, who is visiting family in the village. Although their relatives try to push the two apart they eventually run off to London where John is arrested and imprisoned.

== Critical reception ==
A reviewer in The Courier-Mail found that this "is a book of youth, misunderstood and battered by the blindness and prejudice of the hide-bound middle-aged. Put so baldly, it sounds commonplace, but there is nothing commonplace in the beautifully-written story. It tells with that delicacy of touch that is part of Mr. Martin Boyd's charm."

In The Age, the reviewer was rather dismissive, noting: "Mr Boyd needs a bigger and better theme for the display of his literary talents."

== See also ==
- 1934 in Australian literature
