= Space (2001 TV series) =

2001 BBC documentary

- The Ultimate Journey Beyond Any Known Universe
- Also known as: Hyperspace
- Genre: Documentary
- Narrated by: Sam Neill
- Theme music composer: Ty Unwin
- Country of origin: United Kingdom
- Original language: English
- No. of episodes: 6

Production
- Executive producers: Philip Dolling & Emma Swain
- Producers: Luke Campbell & Jeremy Turner
- Running time: 206 minutes (6 episodes)

Original release
- Release: 22 July – 26 August 2001

Space (Hyperspace in the United States) is a 2001 BBC documentary which ran for six episodes covering a number of topics in relation to outer space. The series is hosted and narrated by actor Sam Neill.

== Episodes ==
No.	Title	Original release date
1	"Star Stuff"	22 July 2001
The first episode covers the origins of life and how everything is produced by the process in which stars burn their fuel.
2	"Staying Alive"	29 July 2001
This episode analyses the chances of Earth being destroyed by a black hole or asteroid.
3	"Black Holes"	5 August 2001
Episode three looks at how black holes are formed and how they behave, with potential to destroy the Solar System.
4	"Are We Alone?"	12 August 2001
Number four looks for potential homes of extraterrestrial life and the chances that humans could make contact.
5	"New Worlds"	19 August 2001
The fifth episode covers the possibility of colonising and terraforming planets both in the Solar System and beyond into deep space.
6	"Boldly Go"	26 August 2001
The final episode looks at the technologies that are being developed to further enable humans ventures into space.

== DVD releases ==
- The series was released on region 2 DVD in 2001 by BBC Video.
- In 2002, the series was released in the United States on region 1 DVD (under the alternate title Hyperspace), also by BBC Video.
