= Just Out of Reach (film) =

1979 film

Just Out of Reach is a 1979 Australian film starring Lorna Lesley and Sam Neill.

== Plot ==
Self-destructive Cathy distances herself from her cold British parents, and enters into an uncommunicative relationship with an aspiring poet.

== Cast ==
- Lorna Lesley as Cathy
- Sam Neill as Mike
- Ian Gilmour as Steve
- Martin Vaughan as Father
- Judi Farr as Mother
