= The City of No =

- Directed by: Chris Thomson
- Written by: Ian Cross
- Produced by: Chris Thomson
- Starring: Bill Johnson; Jeremy Stephens; Shirley McGregor
- Release date: August 23, 1971
- Running time: 45 min
- Country: New Zealand
- Language: English

The City of No is a 1971 New Zealand television play. It was written by Ian Cross and starred Jeremy Stephens, Shirley Gruar (née McGregor) and Bill Johnson. It also features Sam Neill in a small early role.

The City of No was filmed over a month in Wellington and Lower Hutt with production occurring in 1970. The script had been written four years earlier.

== Synopsis ==
A businessman leaves his wife for a younger woman and an old friend gets involved.

== Cast ==
- Bill Johnson as Graham Hollis
- Jeremy Stephens as Bob Gilbert
- Shirley McGregor as Carole
- Pamela Hewes
- Raeburn Hirsch
- Helen McGrath
- Sam Neill

== Reception ==
The Press's reviewer was "disappointed with it, partly because of its content, partly through production faults."
