= Night Terrace =

Science fiction radio show

- Genre: Science fiction comedy
- Running time: 28 minutes
- Country of origin: Australia
- Language: English
- Home station: BBC Radio 4 Extra
- Starring: Jackie Woodburne, Ben McKenzie and Petra Elliott
- Created by: Ben McKenzie, David Ashton, Petra Elliott, John Richards and Lee Zachariah
- Written by: John Richards, David Ashton, Ben McKenzie and Lee Zachariah
- Produced by: Ben McKenzie and John Richards
- Recording studio: Melbourne, Australia
- Original release: 21 April 2019 – present
- No. of series: 2
- No. of episodes: 17
- Website: Official Website

Night Terrace is a scripted science fiction audio comedy produced by Splendid Chaps Productions. Originally released as a paid digital download in 2014, the first two seasons have been broadcast on BBC Radio 4 Extra since 2019.

The show stars Jackie Woodburne as Dr Anastasia Black, a "science hero" whose retirement from the mysterious "D.E.P.A.R.T.M.E.N.T." is cut short when her Melbourne terrace house unexpectedly starts to travel through space and time. She is joined by student and door-to-door electricity plan salesman Eddie Jones (Ben McKenzie) and, later, fellow ex-D.E.P.A.R.T.M.E.N.T. agent Susan Denholm (Petra Elliott). The first season won the Convenor's Award for Excellence at the 2014 Aurealis Awards.

== Crowdfunding ==
Each season so far has been primarily funded through Kickstarter campaigns. Season 1 met its base funding target plus two stretch goals which allowed The Making of Night Terrace documentary and The Adventures of Eddie mini-series to be created. Season 2 met its base funding target plus one stretch goal, which allowed a Live episode to be created where backers and friends of the production became part of the episode as the live audience. Season 3 met its base funding target plus two stretch goals which allow The Night Terrace Summer Special (a digital book collection of stories, trivia and puzzles in the style of TV annuals and comic books) and a mini-series revealing the untold adventures of Sue to be made.

== Companion podcast ==
To accompany the broadcast of Night Terrace on BBC Radio 4 Extra Vaya Pashos, of the Neighbours recap podcast Neighbuzz, hosted a companion podcast (alongside Woodburne the show has had past and present Neighbours stars in guest roles). Each episode featured members of the cast and crew discussing the episode just broadcast, the show in general, and answering fan questions.

== Cast ==
=== Regular cast ===
- Jackie Woodburne – Dr Anastasia Black
- Ben McKenzie – Eddie Jones
- Petra Elliott – Sue | The Borealian Commander | Dr Housen
- David Lamb – various
- Amanda Buckley – various

=== Guest cast ===
- Adam Richard – (Discoworld)
- Alan Brough – Barry (Sound & Fuhrer)
- Andrew McClelland – The Colonel / Mr Bell (Time of Death)
- Cal Wilson – Vraxnall (Moving House)
- Celia Pacquola – (The Edification of Anastasia Black)
- Chris Taylor – The Captain (Starship Australis)
- Colette Mann – The Tea Lady (Sense & Susceptibility)
- Emily Taheny – (The Edification of Anastasia Black)
- Francis Greenslade – Morrie (Starship Australis)
- Ian Smith – Bunny (Sense & Susceptibility)
- Jane Badler – (Home) | (Things That Go Bump in the Night Terrace)
- Lawrence Leung – (Things That Go Bump in the Night Terrace)
- Louise Jameson – Marjorie (Sense & Susceptibility)
- Steven Gates – (Situational Awareness)
- Tegan Higginbotham – (Situational Awareness)
- Toby Truslove – Vraxnall (Moving House) | The Hostile Takeover Commander (The Outsourcing)
- Virginia Gay – Miss Liaina Baker (Time of Death)
- Aahmer Rahman – Tony (The Outsourcing)
- Andrew Hansen – (The Edification of Anastasia Black) | (The Retirement of Horatio Gray) | (Home Again)
- Brianna Williams – (Ancient History)
- Cate Wolfe – The Human Commander (Moving House) | Carol (The Outsourcing)
- Eryn Saunders – (The Last Hunt) | (Situational Awareness)
- Gary Russell – Charles (Sense & Susceptibility)
- George Ivanoff – (A Verb of Nouns)
- Gnarnayarrahe Waitairie – (The Last Hunt)
- Jason Tamiru – (The Last Hunt)
- John Clarke – Mr King (Sense & Susceptibility)
- Kevin Powe – (A Verb of Nouns)
- Laura Hughes – (The Edification of Anastasia Black)
- Lee Zachariah – Vraxnall (Moving House)
- Michael F Cahill – (A Verb of Nouns)
- Ming–Zhu Hii (Full Steam)
- Naomi Rukavina – The Story Teller (The Last Hunt) | (Discoworld)
- Phil Zachariah – The Hitlers (Sound & Fuhrer)
- Samantha Streeter – Voice of the Toy / SquidgyPiggy (Sound & Fuhrer)

=== Additional voices ===
- Nicholas Briggs – Moving House
- Virginia Gay – Moving House | Home
- Aahmer Rahman – Starship Australis
- Allan Carey – Sense & Susceptibility | Time of Death
- Andrew Hansen – Moving House | Ancient History
- Andrew Waddington – Starship Australis | The Outsourcing | Sense & Susceptibility
- Anniene Stockton – Time of Death | The Outsourcing
- Brianna Williams – Sense & Susceptibility | Full Steam
- Daniel Sullivan – The Outsourcing
- David Ashton – Moving House | The Outsourcing | Full Steam | A Verb of Nouns
- Glenn Greening – Starship Australis
- Graeme Callaghan – The Outsourcing | Sense & Susceptibility | Full Steam
- John Richards – Full Steam
- Karen Pickering – Moving House | Discoworld
- Kevin Powe – Home | Ancient History | The Retirement of Horatio Gray
- Kyle Threlfo – Sense & Susceptibility
- Michael F Cahill – Sense & Susceptibility
- Michael Ward – Moving House
- Richard Schipper – Sense & Susceptibility | Full Steam | The Retirement of Horatio Gray
- Sam(antha) Streeter – A Verb of Nouns | The Retirement of Horatio Gray
- Stephen Hall – Sense & Susceptibility
- Steven Petrenko – The Outsourcing
- Tony Flynn – The Outsourcing

=== Hello My Name is Eddie ===
- Ben McKenzie – Eddie Jones
- Petra Elliott – Sue
- Perri Cummings – Professor Brenda
- Noah Moon – The Time Traveller
- David Ashton – The Office Worker
- Lee Zachariah – Shop Assistant
- John Richards – Shop Assistant
- George Ivanoff – Wiliams
- Brianna Williams – Gilbert | Rebecca
- Lisa-Skye – Claudia
- Amanda Buckley – Jamie

== Episodes ==
=== Season 1 ===
Title	Original Runtime	Written By
Moving House	25:50	John Richards
Starship Australis	27:59	Lee Zachariah
Time of Death	28:50	Ben McKenzie
The Outsourcing	27:59	David Ashton
Sound & Fuehrer	27:13	John Richards
The Last Hunt	29:16	Ben McKenzie
Discoworld	28:29	Lee Zachariah
Home	30:19	John Richards

=== Season 2 ===
Title	Original Runtime	Written By
Sense & Susceptibility	25:25	John Richards
Full Steam	29:18	Ben McKenzie
A Verb of Nouns	33:27	John Richards
Things that Go Bump in the Night Terrace	26:46	David Ashton
Ancient History	28:24	Ben McKenzie
The Edification of Anastasia Black	30:47	Lee Zachariah
The Retirement of Horatio Gray	32:44	Lee Zachariah
Home Again	26:26	John Richards
Situational Awareness (Live Episode)	40:41	John Richards, David Ashton, Lee Zachariah and Ben McKenzie

=== Season 3 ===
TBA in 2026 (estimated release date)

== Bonus episodes ==
=== The Making of Night Terrace ===
Narrated and produced by Josh Kinal, this episode is 27:27 long. It features interviews with all the main cast and creators of Night Terrace.

=== Hello My Name is Eddie ===
Title	Length	Written By
The Academic Transcript of Death	03:32	Lee Zachariah, Ben McKenzie
The Awkward Small Talk of Death	05:57	Ben McKenzie, David Ashton
A Trip to the Milk Bar of Death	02:37	David Ashton
The Psychological Experiment of Death	04:36	Ben McKenzie
The Job of a Lifetime of Death	04:05	Ben McKenzie
Did You Know that You Can Save 4% of Death	04:42	Ben McKenzie, Lee Zachariah

=== Horatio's Travels ===
Title	Length	Written By
The Painting	03:00	Lee Zachariah
Relativity	02:59	Lee Zachariah
History	01:55	Lee Zachariah
The Houseguests	04:19	Lee Zachariah
Settling Down	04:05	Lee Zachariah
Messages	03:38	Lee Zachariah

=== Night Your Own Terrace ===
The Night Your Own Terrace mini-episodes were written for backers at the Night Producer or Choose-Your-Own-Night Terrace level of their Kickstarter campaign for Season 2. The backers provided the writers with personal writing prompts & all of Jackie Woodburne's lines were recorded months in advance, providing a feeling of deja vu across the episodes (both overt and covert).

Title	Length	Writers
An Echo of Socks	07:54	Tony Flynn, Ben McKenzie
Dinosaurs of Antarctica	07:36	Robin Bland, David Ashton
Habitat of Mushrooms	09:44	David Chilcott, John Richards
The Conditions of Entry	07:11	Daniel Sullivan, Ben McKenzie
The Sandwiches of Pluto	07:51	Craig Irvine, David Ashton
The Smell of Books	09:32	Samantha Streeter, John Richards

=== The Adventures of Sue ===
TBA in 2026 (estimated release date)
