= The Zookeeper (2001 film) =

2001 film by Ralph Ziman

- Directed by: Ralph Ziman
- Screenplay by: Ralph Ziman; Matthew Bishop
- Produced by: Michael Lunderskov; Michael Laursen; Gavin Poolman; Rob Langestraat; Michael Alden; Juliusz Kossakowski
- Starring: Sam Neill; Gina McKee; Ulrich Thomsen
- Cinematography: Piotr Kukla
- Edited by: Christopher Holmes; Ralph Ziman
- Music by: Nikolaj Egelund
- Production companies: Svendsen Films ApS; Apollo Films; Pavel Novy Produkce; Maborosi
- Distributed by: Bontonfilm; Eurimages; Ministi; Universal Production Partners
- Release dates: September 13, 2001 (Toronto International Film Festival); November 15, 2001 (Fort Lauderdale International Film Festival); November 15, 2001 (Czech Republic)
- Running time: 99 minutes
- Countries: Denmark; United Kingdom; Czech Republic; Netherlands
- Language: English
- Budget: $6 million

The Zookeeper is an independent 2001 drama film directed by Ralph Ziman and starring Sam Neill, Gina McKee, and Ulrich Thomsen. It was screened at the 2001 Toronto International Film Festival and the 2001 Fort Lauderdale International Film Festival.

== Plot ==
In an unspecified Eastern European country, soldiers round up the inhabitants of a village. Ten year old Zioig (Javor Loznica) is separated from his mother. While being transported in a truck, Zioig's father (Mikulás Kren) tells his son that he is a man now and that grown men do not cry. The soldiers kill the men but Zioig manages to escape.

Meanwhile, in the capital city, a former Interior Ministry official and Communist party member named Ludovic (Sam Neill) works at a zoo. He receives a letter from his estranged daughter Anna in Paris who wants to reconcile with her father. With the city under siege, Ludovic volunteers to help the Indian veterinarian (Om Puri) to look after the animals until they can safely evacuate them. Due to scarce supplies, they are forced to put the animals on rations.

Elsewhere, the orphaned Zioig is picked up by a truck carrying United Nations peacekeepers. During the journey, he jumps out of the truck while the peacekeepers are asleep and steals two boxes of supplies. Back in the capital city, Ludovic encounters the militia leader Dragov (Ulrich Thomsen) at a checkpoint. Despite lacking identity papers, Dragov lets him through because they are of the same race. Ludovic moves into the zoo and helps the veterinarian to look after the animals. Ludovic develops an attachment to a female Capuchin monkey named "Luisa."

While visiting the wolves' pen, Ludovic encounters the orphaned Zioig and tells the boy to leave. Amidst the fighting, Ludovic befriends the Vet while drinking. The Vet tells Ludovic that good men do the right thing in bad times. The following morning, Dragov and his militia visit the zoo and arrests the Vet because he is of a different race. When Ludovic protests, Dragov replies that they will let him go if he is innocent. Ludovic is forced to look after the animals alone.

The following morning, Ludovic finds the Vet strung up outside and buries him. Later, Zioig returns and forces his way into Ludovic's cabin with a gun. When the boy faints, Ludovic takes pity on him and tends to the boy's leg wound with antibiotics. After feeding Zioig, Ludovic tells him that he has to leave the next day because his presence would endanger him. Zioig complies, but later returns with a woman, who identifies herself as Zioig's mother Ankica (Gina McKee). Taking pity on them, Ludovic decides to allow Zioig and his mother to stay.

After a blood-stained Zioig returns with cigarettes taken from a man that he purportedly found dead, Ankica confides in Ludovic that she is losing touch with her son. While at the zoo's butchery, Ankica recounts her experiences in a prison camp where she was raped by a guard who used to be her neighbor. Ankica also begs Ludovic to be kind to her son in order to help him.

While Ludovic spends time with Zioig, Ankica reads through Ludovic's diaries. When Dragov and his militia return to seize the zoo's domestic animals for food, Ludovic hides Ankica inside a barn. While Dragov and one of his men Slavko (Srdjan Simeonovich) search the barn, Ludovic distracts them by giving them a lion cub as a mascot.

After the militiamen leave, Ankica kisses Ludovic out of gratitude. Ludovic comforts the distraught Zioig, who is troubled by the suffering zoo animals. When Ludovic discovers that Ankica has been reading through his diaries, he angrily orders them to leave. Zioig storms out in a fit of rage. Ludovic and Ankica eventually discover that her son has gunned down the militiaman Slavko. Ankica searches for her son but he avoids her.

Returning to the cabin, Ankica and Ludovic reconcile and develop feelings for each other. The following morning, Ludovic feeds the body of the militiaman to a lion. That night, the zoo's monkey house is hit by artillery. Ludovic tries to rescue the monkeys but they succumb to the flames, smoke, and trauma. After some argument, Ankica convinces Ludovic to leave the zoo with her and her son.

Later, Ludovic and Ankica comfort Zioig as he mourns over a wolf killed during the bombardment. Mother and son reconcile while Ludovic imparts fatherly advice to Zioig that grown men do cry. The following morning, Ludovic bids farewell the animals and prepares to leave the zoo with Zioig and Ankica. However, Ankica is killed by one of Dragov's snipers. Ludovic tends to her while Dragov and his militia drive away from the city. As UN peacekeepers enter the city and evacuate the animals, Ludovic and Zioig bury Ankica. They then depart the zoo with the orphaned wolf cub.

== Cast ==
- Sam Neill as Ludovic
- Gina McKee as Ankica
- Ulrich Thomsen as Dragov
- Om Puri as the Vet
- Marek Vašut as Yeltsov
- Javor Loznica as Zioig
- Srdjan Simeonovich as Slavko
- Arnošt Proschek as Dušan
- Mikuláš Křen as Father
- Tomás Valík as Soldier 1
- Stanislav Hybler as Soldier 2
- Hana Pastejříková as Woman at Window
- Drahomíra Fialková as Neighbor Woman
- Ilja Racek as Stanislaw
- Rudolf Jelínek as Zoo Official
- Ivo Niederle as Zoo Worker 1
- Milan Kroužil as Zoo Worker 2
- Jan Bernášek as Zoo Worker 3
- Josef Nedorost as Zoo Worker 4
- Jakob Schwarz as UN Driver
- Noel le Bon as UN Mate
- Colin Stuart as UN Soldier
- Roman Fara as Dargov's Sharpshooter
- Filip Truhlář as Newspaper boy
- Susan Caskie as TV Reporter 1
- Rianne Kooiman as TV Reporter 2

== Production ==
The Zookeeper was filmed at several locations in the Czech Republic including Brandýs nad Labem-Stará Boleslav, Doksany, Milovice, and Prague.

== Critical reception ==
The Variety reviewer Robert Koehler praised Ralph Ziman and Matthew Bishop's for exploring Sam Neill's character Ludovic. Koehler also praised Neill's portrayal of Ludvoic, whom he described as a "man who has emotionally shut down but can't stop the world from marching back in." Despite commending Piotr Kukla's lensing and Ziman's juxtaposition of explosions in the zoo scenes, Koehler criticized Nikolaj Egelund's score as a poor imitation of Lisa Gerrard's signature vocal music.

Writing for Killer Movie Reviews, Andrea Chase described the movie as "a haunting film, superbly directed, and filmed with a harsh beauty".

== Awards ==
The Zookeeper won the 2001 Fort Lauderdale International Film Festival's awards for Best Film (Ralph Ziman) and Best Actor (Sam Neill). Ziman also won the 2002 Taos Talking Picture Festival's Land Grant Award.
