= Martin Boyd =

Novelist, autobiographer

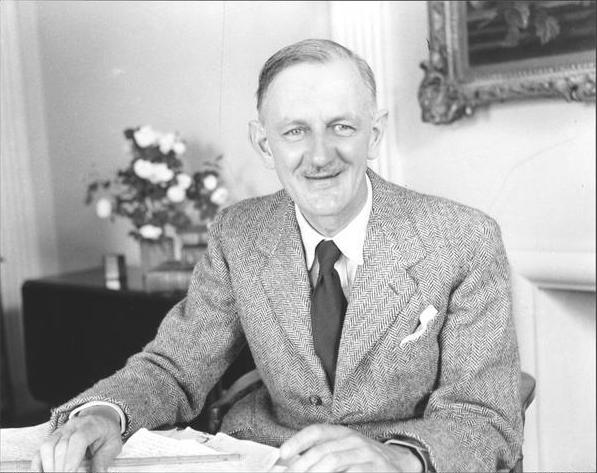
- Boyd seated at his desk in his home, "Plumstead", near Cambridge, England, 1947
- Born: Martin à Beckett Boyd; 10 June 1893; Lucerne, Switzerland
- Died: 3 June 1972 (aged 78); Rome, Italy
- Burial place: Protestant English Cemetery, Rome
- Other name: Martin Mills (pseudonym)
- Education: Trinity Grammar School, Melbourne
- Known for: Novels, autobiographies, family
- Parents: Arthur Merric Boyd (father); Emma Minnie Boyd (née à Beckett) (mother)
- Relatives: Merric Boyd, Penleigh Boyd, Helen Read (siblings); Lucy Beck, Arthur Boyd, Guy Boyd, David Boyd, Mary Nolan, Robin Boyd (Emma née Mills, grandmother)
- Awards: ALS Gold Medal – pseud. Martin Mills 1928 'The Montforts' – author; ALS Gold Medal 1957 'A Difficult Young Man' – author
- Military career
- Allegiance: United Kingdom
- Branch: British Army
- Service years: 1916-1918

Martin à Beckett Boyd (10 June 1893 – 3 June 1972) was an Australian writer born into the à Beckett–Boyd family, a family synonymous with the establishment, the judiciary, publishing and literature, and the visual arts since the early 19th century in Australia.

Boyd was a novelist, memoirist and poet who spent most of his life after World War I in Europe, primarily Britain. His work drew heavily on his own life and family, with his novels frequently exploring the experiences of the Anglo-Australian upper and middle classes. His writing was also deeply influenced by his experience of serving in World War One.

Boyd's siblings included the potter Merric Boyd (1888–1959), painters Penleigh Boyd (1890–1923) and Helen à Beckett Read, née Boyd (1903–1999). He was intensely involved in family life and took a keen interest in the development of his nephews and nieces and their families, including potter Lucy Beck (1916-2009), painter Arthur Boyd (1920–1999), sculptor Guy Boyd (1923–1988), painter David Boyd (1924–2011), painter Mary Nolan (1926–2016) – who was married to painters John Perceval and Sidney Nolan – and architect Robin Boyd (1919–1971). His nephew Guy Boyd was his literary executor.

== Life ==
Boyd's friends saw him as "[c]harming, generous, frivolous and funny". He was sensitive and private; a complex man who struggled with his identity as an Anglo-Australian, as an expatriate writer and with religious beliefs. He did not believe in the class superiority which many of his critics levelled at him; was a loyal family man and friend, yet never found a lasting romantic relationship of his own. As a writer he wrote from experience and about what he knew intimately but was never sure about himself. Throughout his life he felt like an outsider whether in Australia or Europe.

=== Childhood and education ===
Martin à Beckett Boyd was born in Lucerne, Switzerland, on 10 June 1893. He was the youngest son of Arthur Merric Boyd (1862-1940) and Emma Minnie à Beckett (1858-1936) who were both established painters. At the time of his birth, the family was travelling through Europe, supported financially by his maternal grandmother, Emma à Beckett, wife to William Arthur Callendar à Beckett. It was Emma's fortune, inherited from her father, John Mills, an ex-convict who founded the Melbourne Brewery, that allowed their family to live comfortably. He regarded this "somewhat casual birthplace as one of the factors accounting for his lifelong inability ever to feel completely at home anywhere."

Boyd lived in the Melbourne suburb of Sandringham until he was 13 when the family moved permanently to the family farm in Yarra Glen, Victoria. He had a love of books and writing from an early age, but he was also colour blind. He became the only writer in his ancient family amongst painters and artists. Brenda Niall, Boyd's biographer, comments, "His family seems to have been one of those so distinctive in character and achievement that it confers its own citizenship. Being a Boyd was more important than being an Australian: it gave him a sense of identity strong enough to bypass nationalism for civilization."

Boyd's siblings included the potter William Merric Boyd (1888–1959), and the painters Theodore Penleigh Boyd (1890–1923) and Helen à Beckett Read (1903–1999). He fondly remembered his childhood years at Yarra Glen. "[T]he Yarra, only yards away, still provides summer swimming as it did for the Boyds. The river yields cold eels that writhe and bite like snakes but make nice eating later. On the farm the Boyds had ponies, hunting, and fishing, and gorged themselves in the evenings on unlimited fruit and cream." He enjoyed his school years at Trinity Grammar School, Kew. Niall notes that "Boyd did respectably in academic work; he edited the school magazine, the Mitre; he developed a love of English poetry; and, through [his headmaster's] example, he began to consider a future as a clergyman."

After finishing school in 1912, Boyd was undecided on a career path and so commenced study for a religious vocation at St John's College, St Kilda. He did not see out the year but this was the beginning of a lifelong, but never resolved, investigation of the place of religious devotion in his life. At the suggestion of his mother, he began training as an architect at Purchas and Teague in Melbourne.

=== War experiences ===
Initially feeling no pressure to enlist, Boyd eventually signed up after hearing that some of his contemporaries at Trinity Grammar had died during the landing at Gallipoli. On the advice of his family, who thought he might not survive the rigours expected of an ordinary Australian soldier, he travelled to England and in 1916 took up a position as a commissioned officer in the Royal East Kent Regiment, known as the "Buffs". After fighting in the trenches in France for several months during 1916 and 1917, Boyd requested a transfer and was accepted into the Royal Flying Corps in 1917 where he stayed until the end of the World War I. His war experiences coloured the rest of his life, including his writing.

In the 1940s Boyd questioned following Britain into World War Two believing that Australia should look to America and Mediterranean countries for replacement ties. Even though he had served in the military, he felt a strong sense of injustice at the bombing of German cities and the killing of innocent women and children, and questioned the complicity of the Church of England in the atrocities during that time.

Michael Bardwell notes that Boyd was "a great campaigner [...] often writing letters to the press about matters he thought were of public importance." A wartime example of this activism was an incident in December 1943, which Boyd relates in his autobiography Day of my Delight, quoted by Bardwell: "A group of eminent people had drawn up a petition to end by mutual agreement the night bombing of cities, which had now become senseless massacres. I put one of the printed forms of this petition on the village notice board, and one on my gate, saying it could be signed at my house. The notices were torn off at night. . .I then put up another inscribed: "The object of this petition is to stop the murder of women and children. Will those who think this aim undesirable, please come in and explain why, instead of tearing this notice off under cover of darkness?" No one came, and a farmer's wife in the village said: "It is a pity Mr. Boyd put up those notices. It quite spoiled the Christmas spirit."

While Boyd did not see himself as a pacifist (he described his belief as 'qualified pacifism', he supported those who did. Throughout the years his consistent opposition to war included the publication of a seven-part protest pamphlet during the war in Vietnam entitled Why They Walk Out (1970). Extracts of the essay were published in Australia.

=== Life after World War One ===
Boyd returned to Australia after World War One but found he no longer fitted in. Because of his decision to join the British Army, he felt that a wedge had developed between him and his friends as their wartime experiences were different. Listless and directionless he left Melbourne in 1921 to live in London, did some newspaper work and travelled. Wearying of that world too and with the death of his brother Penleigh in 1923, Boyd again turned to religion joining an Anglican Franciscan community in Dorset. This too was a phase, however, so he left and continued on as before. For almost twenty years he lived a nomadic life, never staying long in any place and owning few possessions. He survived financially on one hundred pounds a year from his parents, a short stint as acting editor of The British Australasian, and sporadic payments from his writing. Joan Lindsay, author of Picnic at Hanging Rock, remembers her cousin Martin as a gentleman. He was a modest, free-spirited bachelor, adept at finding comfortable lodging. She remembers, "…he had always had a nose for odd and unusual pieces of furniture and queer old paintings picked up for a few pounds. During the war he had embellished his dugout in France with a large statue of his favourite Dancing Faun, dragging it from one filthy hole to another until forced to abandon it forever in the oozing mud". The image of loss in oozing mud is recreated by Boyd's character Dominic Langton who flung his Military Cross and other medals into the "clayey-yellow pond". As Boyd wrote in When Blackbirds Sing, Langton "his native Toryism was shocked at his anarchy. He realized fully the implication of what he had done". Langton's wife Helena cries "we must try to rake them out". Langton replies: "we can't. They're in the middle - I threw them there."

In 1925 Boyd's first novel, Love Gods, was published. He had found his vocation and between 1925 and 1949 he published ten novels, a volume of autobiography and a children's story.

While living in England he is recorded as having an affair with a woman. Boyd's sexuality was, and continues to be, the subject of conjecture. Illicit love, and same-sex desire, are prevailing themes in his work. A 1930s novel, The Shepherd of Admetus was rejected by publishers due to its overt homosexual narrative.

After his father's death in July 1940, his mother's inheritance was released, which gave Boyd the financial freedom to live life however he chose. The money originally came from Martin's grandmother Emma à Beckett (née Mills) and had been secured with the direct intervention of his male relatives.

Boyd delayed a return to Australia in the hope he could return a success. His motivation was not to be a disappointment to his family and he was plagued by doubts about his own achievements. After the success of Lucinda Brayford, he returned to Australia in 1948, intending to remain living in his grandfather à Beckett's home, 'The Grange', near Berwick. After three years he left again for England in 1951, disappointed by his dream of 'The Grange' and the past, ignored by the Australian literary establishment, and out of touch with his younger relatives. This wrenching departure of goodbye to his newly created life, his country and his family finds its fitful expression in the discarding of military medals to the waters, debris and mud of a dam on a later owned property in a novel written in Rome [described herein in an above paragraph].

Boyd moved to Rome in 1957 where he wrote the Langton tetralogy, frequently considered his finest work, the second autobiography, Day of My Delight, the travel story Much else in Italy and a light novel The Tea-Time of Love. Despite his literary successes, Boyd's medical expenses in the year before his death were paid by his nephews Arthur, Guy, and David Boyd. His loyalty to his family and friends was being generously repaid. Brenda Niall recounts, "A few days before Christmas 1971, Boyd was astonished to get an official letter from Canberra. The Commonwealth Literary Fund had awarded him $1000 and a life pension of $30 a week "out of regard for the part you have played in the development of the literature of Australia". This had come about because a number of his Australian friends had heard of his illness and financial difficulties; and stirred others to do something about it. Thelma Herring, Barrie Reid, Patrick White and Gough Whitlam (then Leader of the Federal Opposition and a member of the Commonwealth Literary Fund committee) were among those responsible."

=== Death ===
Martin Boyd suffered from ill health for the last decade of his life. He died of cancer on 3 June 1972 just days after being received into the Catholic Church. He is buried near the poets John Keats and Percy Bysshe Shelley in Rome's Protestant 'English cemetery'.

== Social image and views ==
The Boyd family had considerable influence which extended not only throughout the state of Victoria, where Boyd grew up, but extended to the rest of Australia and parts of Europe. They are known for their various contributions to the creative and literary arts but also had many links to the military and, through the à Becketts, to legal affairs. Martin Boyd was one such individual who greatly contributed to Australian Literature. Being from an upper-middle-class family predominantly associated with the creative arts was a fundamental influence in the development of his identity and the sense of beauty that would later influence his literary style.

With the development and refinement of this artistic flair, Boyd's novels soon gained the appreciation of many despite an inherent disinterest in Australian literature. His social comedies provided colourful characters in understandable if not relatable settings.

=== Behaviour ===
One of the defining characteristics of Boyd was his reputation as a social enigma. This can mainly be traced to the contrast between the professional aspects of his life and the socially deviant behaviour of, and rumours surrounding, his personal life.

One such behavioural trait was his inability to remain in one place for an extended amount of time, which he himself referred to as wanderlust. Throughout his life he took up residence in a variety of places throughout Australia and Europe. Because of this trait, Boyd was often considered a travelled individual, even publishing his own travel book, and extended his social influence to many of the new locations where he took up residence. However his well known wanderlust also contributed to a reputation for restlessness among his social peers and raised the issue of his inability to settle down and take a wife.

The fact he never married, coupled with rumours and reports of behaviour deviant from that expected of a gentleman and popular author in his position, began to raise questions and doubts about his sexual tendencies. The suspicions centred around his close relationships with those of the same sex; in particular, he was suspected of having an illicit relationship with a young Italian boy, Luciano Trombini.

Despite Boyd's denial and the lack of any substantial evidence, these claims fundamentally changed views of Boyd and his literature. A few of Boyd's works had already been subjected to censorship and one novel had been refused publication for its homosexual content.

However it was not until well after his death that such issues were viewed without the sense of prejudice and taboo that were common during his time. It was then that multiple papers analysing the erotic and homosexual undertones of his works were published.

=== Social views ===
Boyd was quite outspoken in his beliefs and morals. The publication of his two autobiographies, and to a lesser extent the biographies detailing his life and his novels contain his opinions and beliefs on society and the contemporary issues of the time.

One of the foremost beliefs that influenced Boyd and his works is that of religion. Despite his move towards literature, Boyd retained strong religious beliefs and morals which played a big part in many of his works. This was one of the fundamental reasons for Boyd's success, despite a disinterest in Australian literature, as his strong religious beliefs and morals resonated with the views societies had at the time. He later expressed his disdain for the adoption of purely materialistic values and the self-importance that riddled the aristocracy at the time.

Another major issue surrounding Boyd's values was his disapproval of the supposed blind patriotism encouraged during his education and military service. In his autobiographies he notes how such practices took attention from required skills and left many students disillusioned, particularly many of the young Englishmen facing the possibility of life on the street with no employment opportunities.This may in part be related to the sense of estrangement between Boyd and Australia as he found himself torn between the old world and the new one.

== Critical reception and recognition ==
In 1928 Boyd won the Australian Literature Society Gold Medal for his novel The Montforts. The novel, written under the pseudonym Martin Mills, is based on the history of Boyd's à Beckett ancestors. In 1957, he again won the ALS Gold Medal award for A Difficult Young Man, published in his own name.

Boyd wrote extensively, with early poems, autobiographical books, an essay pamphlet on modern youth, an extensive list of novels, five short stories, and articles on varying subjects, to his name. He is, however, most renowned for his novels, which were inspired, according to many critics, by his own life and family experiences. Often described as a witty author, Boyd is recognised as one of the most important Australian novelists of the 20th century although responses to his novels vary.

=== Early works ===
- Verses

The following novels were written under the pseudonym of Martin Mills, though Boyd later gave his birth name to The Montforts. First publication details given below.

- Love Gods (London, England: Constable, 1925.)
- Bangrane: a memoir (London, England: Constable, 1926.)
- The Madeleine Heritage (Indianapolis, USA: Bobbs-Merrill, 1928.) This is the American edition of The Montforts (London, England: Constable, 1928.)
- Dearest Idol (Indianapolis, USA: Bobbs-Merrill, 1929.) Published under the pseudonym Walter Beckett.

=== Later works ===
While almost all of Boyd's novels were written in England, some regard his earlier novels as less refined when compared to his later works, those being:

- Scandal of Spring (London, England: J. M. Dent, 1934)
- The Lemon Farm (London, England: J. M. Dent, 1935)
- The Painted Princess (London, England: Constable, 1936) For Children.
- The Picnic (London, England: J. M. Dent, 1937)
- Night of the Party (London, England: J. M. Dent, 1938)
- Nuns in Jeopardy (London, England: J. M. Dent, 1940)
- Lucinda Brayford (London, England: Cresset Press, 1946)
- Such Pleasure (London, England: Cresset Press, 1949)
- The Langton tetralogy which, though not published as a series during his lifetime, is now referred to as a collective:
  - The Cardboard Crown (London, England: Cresset Press, 1952)
  - A Difficult Young Man (London, England : Cresset Press, 1955)
  - Outbreak of Love (London, England: John Murray, 1957)
  - When Blackbirds Sing (London, England: Abelard-Schuman, 1962)
- Why They Walk Out (Rome, M. Boyd, 1970)

=== Unpublished works ===
- The Shepherd of Admetus
- Bitter Sauces

=== Autobiography ===
- A Single Flame (London, England: J. M. Dent, 1939)
- Day of My Delight: An Anglo-Australian Memoir (Melbourne, Victoria: Lansdowne, 1965)

=== Subject matter ===
While writing most of his novels in England, Boyd's novels frequently focus on the contrasting and conflicting realities of upper-class English and Australian societies. He tended to concentrate on the niceties and absurdities of social exchanges, instead of a greater concern with universal problems of human life.

Boyd's works do, however, reflect the two major preoccupations of his own life: a spiritual and religious concern; and, the disillusionment with and displacement from the two countries he was affiliated with, England and Australia. This is referred to by Kathleen Fitzpatrick as "the Anglo-Australian malaise". The novels explore the importance of class and social standing in England and Australia that families such as the Boyds experienced. The novel Lucinda Brayford, is a good example of this preoccupation. Biographer and critic, Brian McFarlane, writes, "...Boyd is clearly preoccupied with the way qualities of character and patterns of behavior recur in families. Sometimes, indeed, his stress on hereditary influences seems so bluntly asserted as to rob the impulses and motivations of his characters of some of their interests".

Responses to Boyd's work vary from outright hostility, to others describing his novels as "alone in Australian Literature reflect[ing] the lives of an alienated British elite…". Fitzpatrick writes, "In spite of very great gifts, which included a prose style of great flexibility and grace, Martin Boyd, the man without a country and the writer without a subject has remained a gifted amateur rather than a professional novelist", while McFarlane describes Boyd's virtues as "minor but real".

Boyd's novels are now published in the Penguin Twentieth Century Classics series, and he is described as "rubbing shoulders" with authors such as Franz Kafka. In his own time, Boyd's novels received few reviews in the Australian newspapers, and little critical attention between 1928 and 1949. While Boyd's first three novels did not sell well and led to his following three novels being rejected by publishers, his novel, The Montforts achieved critical success. Despite this, Fitzpatrick wrote in 1963, "He has a public in England, and his novel Lucinda Brayford was a bestseller in America, but his work seems to be little known in Australia...". "Martin Boyd’s work is vaguely felt, I think, to be rather immoral because it is in conflict with the Australian ethos of the moment". In The Australian Book Review, McFarlane also claims that "There has always been something grudging about the Australian response to Boyd. Perhaps he would have been more critically and commercially popular if he had not confined himself to writing about the upper-middle classes".

== Oral History ==
Boyd recounted an oral history of his life and writing in 1965 with Desmond O'Grady (interviewer). This can be found at the National Library of Australia.

== See also ==
- Charles Henry Chomley
- Boyd family
