= Outbreak of Love (novel) =

Book by Martin Boyd

- First edition
- Author: Martin Boyd
- Language: English
- Series: The Langton Tetralogy
- Genre: Literary fiction
- Publisher: John Murray
- Publication date: 1957
- Publication place: Australia
- Media type: Print
- Pages: 254pp
- Preceded by: A Difficult Young Man
- Followed by: When Blackbirds Sing

Outbreak of Love (1957) is a novel by Australian writer Martin Boyd. It is the third in the author's "Langton Tetralogy" (which comprises The Cardboard Crown, A Difficult Young Man, Outbreak of Love and When Blackbirds Sing).

== Story outline ==
The novel is concerned with the marriage of Diana and Wolfie von Flugel in the years leading up to World War I. After Diana damages a tooth on a hard piece of toast she travels to Melbourne to have it repaired. There, on Collins Street, she meets Russell Lockwood, a man from her childhood who has long admired her.

== Critical reception ==
In her essay "Much Else in Boyd : The Relationship between Martin Boyd's Nonfiction Work and his Later Novels" in Southerly magazine in 1978, Susan McKernan notes that Boyd's novels "have been regarded as shrewd social commentaries, or witty novelettes rather than novels of argument. They appear to concentrate on the niceties and absurdities of social exchange rather than the more basic and universal problems of human life. Boyd's role has often been seen as that of the social chronicler, not the committed creative artist." In particular "Outbreak of Love documents the increasing influence of the intellectual whose knowledge is based on a denial of the spiritual life and of those who enjoy power for its own sake. They are more widespread than the Cousin Hettys, Sarahs, and Bert Craigs of the earlier novels. Boyd provides us with a whole society dominated by the puritanical principles he despises."

== Television adaptation ==
A television adaptation of this novel was released in Australia in 1981. It consisted of three one-hour episodes and was written by Howard Griffiths, directed by Oscar Whitbread, and featured Rowena Wallace, Tony Bonner and Sigrid Thornton.

== See also ==
- 1957 in Australian literature

== Notes ==
The novel was re-issued in 2013 as a part of the Text Publishing Text Classics series, with an introduction by Chris Womersley.
