= Cresset Press =

British publishing company

The Cresset Press was a publishing company in London, England, active as an independent press from 1927 for 40 years, and initially specializing in "expensively illustrated limited editions of classical works, like Milton's Paradise Lost" going on to produce well-designed trade editions of literary and political works. Among the leading illustrators commissioned by Cresset were Blair Hughes-Stanton and Gertrude Hermes — The Pilgrim's Progress (1928), The Apocrypha (1929), and D. H. Lawrence's Birds, Beasts and Flowers (1930). Cresset subsequently became part of the Barrie Group of publishers, and later an imprint of the Ebury Press within the Random House Group.

== History ==
Operating from offices at 11 Fitzroy Square, the Cresset Press was founded in 1927 by Dennis Cohen (1891–1970), whose obituary in The Times details some of the company's first titles:

Bacon’s Essays, in folio, printed at the Shakespeare Head, was followed by a number of handsome éditions de luxe, of which the best known today is Gulliver’s Travels decorated by Rex Whistler. An early member of the Double Crown Club, he paid scrupulous attention to the matching of fine hand-press-work with enterprising illustrations, commissioned a number of the best wood-engravers of the day for editions of The Apocrypha or The Pilgrim’s Progress or, on a smaller scale, the elegant four-volume Herrick printed in Oxford’s Fell type, with decorations by Albert Rutherston.
When the market for books like these collapsed in the thirties, the Cresset Press turned to general publishing, matching best sellers like Nora Waln and John O’Hara with poets like Ruth Pitter and scholars like George Sansom, John Summerson and C. P. Fitzgerald. With John Howard as literary adviser the list always contained a strong component of belles lettres (the Cresset Library was a uniquely imaginative series of punctiliously edited reprints), and with James Shand of Shenval Press in charge of production Dennis Cohen’s feeling for the look of his books found a continuing if less luxurious expression.

Other prestigious authors included Carson McCullers. The Cresset Press published the British editions of all her novels and when, in 1951, McCullers spent three months in England, Cohen gave a large reception in her honour that was attended by the leading literati of the day.

=== After 1967 ===
When the publishing company's two owners retired in 1966, the Cresset Press — characterised as having "a distinguished small list" — became part of the Barrie Group of publishers (which previously comprised Barrie & Rockliff, Herbert Jenkins and Hammond & Hammond). After the take-over, Cohen and Howard continued as directors in advisory capacities, and books were produced under the imprint "Barrie and Rockliff/The Cresset Press".

Cresset is now an imprint of the Ebury Press within the Random House Group, but no titles are currently in print. The company is recorded as "non-trading", but as of March 2024 still files annual returns at Companies House.

== Book series ==
- Cresset Historical Series
- The Cresset Library
- Cresset Women's Voices
- The Fitzroy Library
- Introductions to English Literature
- Introductions to German Literature
