= Crawford (name) =

Crawford is a surname and a given name of English and Scottish origins.

== Origin ==
The surname Crawford originates from a locative name, possibly derived from a place name composed of the Old English elements crāwe, Scots Craw ("crow") and ford ("ford"). Examples of such place names include: Crawford, South Lanarkshire, Scotland, Crawford, Dorset, England, and Crawford, Lancashire, England. The surname is most probably derived from the Scottish place name. (Note: The place name is first recorded as Crauford, in about 1150.) In some cases, the surname may be a variant of Crowfoot, a surname derived from a nickname.

The surname Crawford corresponds to the Scottish Gaelic MacCreamhain, and the Irish Mac Crábhagáin.

Early examples of forms of the surname include: John de Crauford, in 1147–1160 (Scotland), Galfridus de Crauford, in 1188–1202 (Scotland), and Nicolaus de Crauford, in 1205 (England).

The given name Crawford, generally a masculine name, is derived from the surname.

== Distribution ==
As a surname, Crawford is the 289th most common name in Great Britain, with 30,292 bearers. It is most common in South Lanarkshire where it is the 5th most common surname with 3,384 bearers and in Highland where it is the 8th most common surname with 3,394 bearers. Other concentrations include Belfast (25th, 3,328), Greater Manchester (58th, 3,378), Lancashire (327th, 1,852), West Midlands (341st, 1,796) and Essex (374th, 1,722), and Yorkshire. The countries with the highest percentages of Crawford families are Canada, Jamaica, Northern Ireland, and Scotland.

1881 distribution
Country	Number	Crawford rank	Ratio/freq
Scotland	8,842	68	1: 423
England	5,794	623	1: 4,207
Wales	94	993	1: 16,685
Jersey	12	761	1: 4,324
Isle of Man	5	1,028	1: 10,854
Guernsey	2	1,834	1: 16,328

2014 distribution
Country	Number	Crawford rank	Ratio/freq
United States	181,790	139	1: 1,762
England	19,633	309	1: 2,750
Canada	15,512	239	1: 2,284
Australia	12,918	191	1: 1,824
Scotland	6,773	77	1: 783
South Africa	6,721	977	1: 8,035
New Zealand	3,839	105	1: 1,184
Northern Ireland	3,422	58	1: 526
Jamaica	2,284	193	1: 1,190
(Republic of Ireland) Ireland	983	719	1: 4,673

== People with the surname Crawford ==
=== A ===
- Aaron Crawford (disambiguation), multiple people
- Adair Crawford (1748–1795), English chemist and physician
- Alan Crawford (disambiguation), multiple people
- Alastair Crawford, English internet entrepreneur
- Alex Crawford (born 1962), British journalist
- Alexander Crawford (disambiguation), multiple people
- Ali Crawford (born 1991), Scottish footballer
- Alice Arnold Crawford (1850–1874), American poet
- Allen Crawford (born 1968), American illustrator
- Amanda Crawford (disambiguation), multiple people
- Amy Crawford (disambiguation), multiple people
- Andrea Crawford (born 1985), Canadian curler
- Andrew Crawford (disambiguation), multiple people
- Anne Crawford (1920–1956), British actress
- Anthony Crawford (disambiguation), multiple people
- Arron Crawford (born 1983), Australian cricketer
- Arthur Crawford (1835–1911), British administrator in India, municipal commissioner and collector
- Arthur Crawford (politician) (1923–1995), Australian politician

=== B ===
- Bertha May Crawford (1886–1937), Canadian singer
- Beverly Crawford (born 1963), American vocalist
- Bill Crawford (disambiguation), multiple people
- Billy Crawford (born 1982), American-Filipino singer
- Bob Crawford (disambiguation), multiple people
- Bobby Crawford (ice hockey) (born 1960), American ice hockey player
- Bobby Crawford (footballer) (1901–1965), Scottish footballer
- Brad Crawford (disambiguation), multiple people
- Brandon Crawford (born 1987), American baseball player
- Brendan Crawford (born 1990), American football player
- Brian Crawford (disambiguation), multiple people
- Broderick Crawford (1911–1986), American actor
- Bruce Crawford (born 1955), Scottish politician
- Bryan Crawford (born 1982), Canadian football player
- Bryant Crawford (born 1997), American basketball player
- Bryce Crawford (1914–2011), American scientist
- Byron Crawford, American television journalist

=== C ===
- Callum Crawford (born 1984), Canadian lacrosse player
- Cam Crawford (born 1988), Australian rugby union footballer
- Candace Crawford (born 1994), Canadian skier
- Candice Crawford (born 1986), American beauty queen
- Carl Crawford (born 1981), American baseball player
- Carl Crawford (boxer) (1935–1999), Guyanese boxer
- Carlos Crawford (born 1971), American baseball player
- Carol Crawford (1934–1982), American backgammon and bridge player
- Carol A. Gotway Crawford, American statistician
- Carole Crawford (1943–2024), Jamaican model
- Carolin Crawford (born 1963), British astronomer
- Caroline Crawford (born 1949), American singer
- Carolyn Crawford (born 1970), American politician
- Casey Crawford (born 1987), American basketball player
- Casey Crawford (American football) (born 1977), American football player
- Chace Crawford (born 1985), American actor
- Chad Crawford, American television presenter
- Chandra Crawford (born 1983), Canadian skier
- Charles Crawford (disambiguation), multiple people
- Chase Crawford (born 1996), American actor
- Cheryl Crawford (1902–1986), American theatre producer
- Chris Crawford (disambiguation), multiple people
- Christina Crawford (born 1939), American writer and actress
- Christina Crawford (wrestler) (born 1988), American professional wrestler
- Cindy Crawford (born 1966), American model
- Clayne Crawford (born 1978), American actor
- Coe I. Crawford (1858–1944), American attorney
- Col Crawford (1913–2007), Australian rules footballer
- Coleman Crawford, American basketball coach
- Colin Crawford (disambiguation), multiple people
- Corey Crawford (born 1984), Canadian ice hockey player
- Corey Crawford (American football) (born 1991), American football player
- Coutts Crawford (1817–1889), English naval officer
- Craig Crawford (born 1956), American journalist
- Craig Crawford (politician) (born 1970), Australian politician
- Cynthia Crawford, British politician
- Cyril Crawford (1902–1988), New Zealand cricketer

=== D ===
- Damion Crawford (born 1980), Jamaican politician
- Dan Crawford (1870–1925), Scottish missionary
- Dana Hudkins Crawford (1931–2025), American conservationist
- Danny Crawford (born 1953), American basketball referee
- Danny Crawford (politician) (born 1950), American politician
- Dave Crawford (coach) (1889–1974), American football and basketball coach
- Dave Crawford (musician) (1943–1988), American musician
- David Crawford (disambiguation), multiple people
- Dean Crawford (1958–2023), Canadian rower
- Dean Crawford (author), British author
- Demetrius Crawford (born 1986), American football player
- Denny Crawford (1921–2005), American football player
- Derrick Crawford (disambiguation), multiple people
- Dick Crawford (born 1933), American politician
- Dirom Grey Crawford (1857–1942), British physician
- Donald Crawford (1837–1919), Scottish politician
- Dorothy Crawford (1911–1988), Australian actress
- Dorothy H. Crawford, Scottish professor
- Doug Crawford, Canadian neuroscientist
- Douglas Crawford (1939–2002), Scottish politician
- Drew Crawford (born 1990), American basketball player in the Israeli Basketball Premier League

=== E ===
- Ed Crawford (born 1964), American singer
- Ed Crawford (American football) (1934–2017), American football player
- Edmund Crawford (1906–1977), English footballer
- Edmund Thornton Crawford (1806–1885), Scottish painter
- Edward Crawford (disambiguation), multiple people
- Edwin L. Crawford (1925–1993), American politician
- Elbert Crawford (born 1966), American football player
- Elizabeth Crawford (born 1959), American painter
- Elizabeth Crawford (historian), British suffrage researcher
- Ella D. Crawford (1852–1932), American temperance movement organizer
- Ellen Crawford (born 1951), American actress
- Emily Crawford (1841–1915), Irish journalist
- Emma Crawford (1858–1939), Australian teacher
- Emmet Crawford (1844–1886), American soldier
- Ernest Crawford (1897–1956), American bassist
- Ernie Crawford (1891–1959), Irish rugby union footballer
- Ewan Crawford (born 1941), Australian judge

=== F ===
- Fergus Crawford (1933–1985), Irish footballer
- Fiona Crawford (born 1977), Australian softball player
- Florence Crawford (1880–1954), American actress
- Floyd Crawford (1928–2017), Canadian ice hockey player
- F. M. Crawford (1883–1953), American basketball coach
- Forrest Crawford (1881–1908), American baseball player
- F. S. Crawford (1829–1890), Australian lithographer
- Francis Crawford (disambiguation), multiple people
- Frank Crawford (disambiguation), multiple people
- Fred Crawford (disambiguation), multiple people
- Freddie Crawford (born 1941), American basketball player

=== G ===
- Garry Crawford (born 1972), British sociologist
- Gary Crawford (disambiguation), multiple people
- Gavin Crawford (born 1971), Canadian comedian
- Gavin Crawford (footballer) (1869–1955), Scottish footballer
- Geoffrey Crawford (rower) (1904–1942), English rower
- Geoffrey W. Crawford (born 1954), American judge
- George Crawford (disambiguation), multiple people
- Gertrude Crawford (1868–1937), British munitions worker
- Gina Crawford (born 1980), New Zealand triathlete
- Ginnie Crawford (born 1983), American track and field athlete
- Glenn Crawford (1913–1972), American baseball player
- Grace Inez Crawford (1889–1977), American singer
- Graeme Crawford (1947–2025), Scottish footballer
- Graham Crawford (born 1967), English cricketer
- Grey Crawford (born 1951), American artist

=== H ===
- Hank Crawford (1934–2009), American saxophonist
- Harold Crawford (disambiguation), multiple people
- Harry Crawford (disambiguation), multiple people
- Hasely Crawford (born 1950), track-and-field athlete
- Hayley Crawford (born 1984), Australian footballer
- Heather Ammons Crawford, American politician
- Hector Crawford (1913–1991), Australian radio producer
- Henry Crawford (disambiguation), multiple people
- Herbert Crawford (1878–1946), Canadian politician
- Hilton Crawford (1945–2014), American football player
- Holly Crawford (born 1984), Australian snowboarder
- Homewood Crawford (1850–1936), English solicitor
- Howard Crawford (1892–1959), Canadian sports journalist
- H. R. Crawford (1939–2017), American politician and developer
- Hubert Crawford, American baseball player
- Hubert H. Crawford (1910–1985), American painter
- Hugh Crawford (disambiguation), multiple people

=== I ===
- Ian Crawford (disambiguation), multiple people
- Ilse Crawford (born 1962), British designer
- Inez Mabel Crawford (1869–1938), American socialite
- Isabella Valancy Crawford (1850–1887), Canadian poet
- Isiaah Crawford (born 1960), American academic administrator

=== J ===
- Jack Crawford (disambiguation), multiple people
- Jackie Crawford (1896–1975), English footballer
- Jackson Crawford (born 1985), American scholar
- Jak Crawford (born 2005), American racing driver
- Jalyn Crawford (born 2006), American football player
- Jamal Crawford (born 1980), American basketball player
- James Crawford (disambiguation), multiple people
- Jan Crawford (born 1965), American journalist
- Janna Crawford, American Paralympic basketball player
- Jay Crawford (born 1965), American sports journalist
- Jen Crawford (born 1964), American rugby union footballer
- Jeremy Crawford, American game designer
- Jermaine Crawford (born 1992), American actor
- Jerry Crawford (born 1947), American baseball umpire
- Jerry Crawford (lawyer) (born 1949), American lawyer and politician
- Jesse Crawford (1895–1962), American pianist
- Jessie Crawford (1828–1875), New Zealand barrack matron
- Jim Crawford (disambiguation), multiple people
- Joan Crawford (died 1977), American actress
- Joan Crawford (basketball) (born 1937), American basketball player
- Joel Crawford (disambiguation), multiple people
- Joey Crawford (born 1951), American basketball referee
- John Crawford (disambiguation), multiple people
- Johnny Crawford (1946–2021), American actor
- Johnny Crawford (ice hockey) (1916–1973), Canadian ice hockey player
- Johnson T. Crawford (1889–1955), American lawyer
- Jonathan Crawford (born 1990), Scottish footballer
- Jonathon Crawford (born 1991), American baseball player
- Jordan Crawford (born 1988), American basketball player
- Joseph Crawford (disambiguation), multiple people
- Josephine Crawford (1878–1952), American painter
- J. P. Crawford (born 1995), American baseball player
- Judy Crawford (born 1951), Canadian skier
- Justann Crawford (born 1973), Australian boxer
- Justin Crawford (disambiguation), multiple people

=== K ===
- Kamie Crawford (born 1992), American television host
- Kate Crawford, Australian writer
- Katherine Crawford (disambiguation), multiple people
- Kathryn Crawford (1908–1980), American actress
- Kathy Crawford (born 1942), American author and politician
- Katy Crawford (born 1987), American musician
- Kay Teer Crawford (1914–2001), American entrepreneur
- Keith Crawford (born 1970), American football player
- Kellie Crawford (born 1974), Australian singer and actress
- Ken Crawford (disambiguation), multiple people
- Kenneth Crawford (1895–1961), British army officer
- Kevin Crawford, Irish musician
- Kevin Crawford (scholar) (1970–2013), American scholar
- Keyron Crawford (born 2003), American football player
- Kieran Crawford (born 1983), Welsh rugby union footballer
- Kitan Crawford (born 2001), American football player
- Kizzy Crawford (born 1996), Welsh singer
- Kristopher Crawford, American physician and politician
- Kutter Crawford (born 1996), American baseball player

=== L ===
- Lady Margaret Crawford, Scottish social figure
- Larry Crawford (born 1959), American football player
- Larry Crawford (baseball) (1914–1994), American baseball player
- Latice Crawford (born 1982), American singer
- Lavell Crawford (born 1968), American comedian
- Lawrence Crawford (soldier) (1611–1645), Scottish soldier
- Lawrence Crawford (mathematician) (1867–1951), Scottish mathematician
- Lavell Crawford (born 1968), American comedian
- Leanna Crawford, American singer-songwriter
- Lectured Crawford (1842–1901), American minister
- Leigh Crawford (born 1946), Australian rules footballer
- Leland D. Crawford (1930–1993), American Marine officer
- Leo Crawford (1903–1973), Irish trade unionist
- Lester Crawford (1938–2021), American politician
- Lilla Crawford (born 2001), American actress
- Linval Crawford (1959–1992), Jamaican cricketer
- Lorin Crawford, American professor
- Lou Crawford (born 1962), Canadian ice hockey player
- Louise Crawford (born 1978), Australian actress
- Louisa Crawford (1789–1857), English songwriter
- Lynn Crawford (born 1964), Canadian chef

=== M ===
- Mairtín Crawford (1967–2004), Northern Irish poet
- Marc Crawford (born 1961), Canadian ice hockey player and coach
- Maria Crawford (1939–2023), American geologist
- Marion Crawford (1909–1988), Scottish educator
- Marjorie Cox Crawford (1903–1983), Australian tennis player
- Mark Crawford (born 1989), American football player
- Mark Crawford (playwright), Canadian playwright
- Markel Crawford (born 1994), American basketball player
- Marta Crawford (born 1969), Portuguese psychologist
- Martha Foster Crawford (1830–1909), American writer
- Martin Crawford, British author
- Martin J. Crawford (1820–1883), American politician
- Marvin Crawford (1932–2004), American skier
- Mary Crawford (disambiguation), multiple people
- Matilda Maranda Crawford (1844–1920), American-Canadian newspaper correspondent
- Matt Crawford (born 1980), American soccer player
- Matthew Crawford (born 1965), American writer
- Max Crawford (1906–1991), Australian historian
- Max Crawford (writer) (1938–2010), American writer
- Medorem Crawford (1819–1891), American soldier
- Melba Crawford, American academic administrator
- Michael Crawford (disambiguation), multiple people
- Mike Crawford (born 1974), American football player
- Morris B. Crawford (1852–1940), American physics professor
- Mush Crawford (1898–1966), American football player

=== N ===
- Narvel J. Crawford (1929–2021), American politician
- Natalie Crawford (1939–2025), American operations researcher and defense analyst
- Nathan Crawford (born 1986), Australian baseball player
- Neil Crawford (disambiguation), multiple people
- Nick Crawford (born 1990), Canadian ice hockey player
- Nicola Crawford (born 1971), English rugby union footballer
- Nigel Crawford (born 1979), Irish Gaelic footballer
- Nikki Crawford, American stage actress
- Noah Crawford (born 1994), American actor

=== O ===
- O. G. S. Crawford (1886–1957), English archaeologist
- Oliver Crawford (1917–2008), American screenwriter
- Omari Crawford, American politician

=== P ===
- Pamela Crawford (1921–1997), Australian artist
- Pat Crawford (disambiguation), multiple people
- Patricia Crawford (1928–2008), American politician
- Patricia Marcia Crawford (1941–2009), Australian historian
- Patrick Crawford (1933–2009), British army medical officer
- Patrick Crawford (soldier) (died 1614), Scottish soldier
- Paul Crawford (disambiguation), multiple people
- Paxton Crawford (born 1977), American baseball player
- Percy Crawford (1902–1960), American evangelist
- Perry O. Crawford Jr. (1917–2006), American computer scientist
- Peter Crawford (disambiguation), multiple people
- Phyllis Crawford (1899–1980), American writer
- Purdy Crawford (1931–2014), Canadian lawyer

=== Q ===
- Quinton Crawford (born 1990), American basketball coach

=== R ===
- Rachael Crawford (born 1969), Canadian actress
- Ralston Crawford (1906–1978), American artist
- Randy Crawford (born 1952), American singer
- Ray Crawford (racing driver) (1915–1996), American test pilot
- Ray Crawford (footballer) (born 1936), English footballer
- Reed Crawford (1924–2006), British milliner
- Reginald Crawford (disambiguation), multiple people
- Rex Crawford (1932–2022), Canadian politician
- Richard Crawford (disambiguation), multiple people
- Rick Crawford (disambiguation), multiple people
- Robbie Crawford (disambiguation), multiple people
- Robert Crawford (disambiguation), multiple people
- Roberta Dodd Crawford (1897–1954), American soprano
- Robyn Crawford (born 1960), American author
- Roger Crawford (disambiguation), multiple people
- Ron Crawford (born 1945), American actor
- Ronald Crawford (disambiguation), multiple people
- Rosanna Crawford (born 1988), Canadian biathlete
- Rowland Crawford (1902–1973), American architect
- Roy Crawford (1948/1949–2016), Northern Irish academic administrator
- Roy Crawford (cricketer) (1917–1996), New Zealand cricketer
- Rufus Crawford (born 1955), American football player

=== S ===
- Sadie Crawford (1885–1965), British-American performer
- Samantha Crawford (born 1995), American tennis player
- Samuel Crawford (disambiguation), multiple people
- Sara Crawford (1876–1949), American politician
- Sarah Crawford (politician), American politician
- Sarah-Jane Crawford (born 1983), English television presenter
- Sax Crawford (1881–1964), American football player
- Seymour Crawford (1944–2018), Irish politician
- Shag Crawford (1916–2007), American baseball umpire
- Shane Crawford (born 1974), Australian rules footballer
- Shane Crawford (soccer) (born 1979), Jamaican footballer
- Shannon Crawford (born 1963), Canadian rower
- Shawn Crawford (born 1978), American sprinter
- Shep Crawford (born 1970), American musician
- Sidney Crawford (1885–1968), South Australian businessman
- Sidney Crawford (footballer) (1887–1979), Scottish footballer
- Sidnie White Crawford (born 1960), American professor
- Sonya Crawford, American journalist
- Sophia Crawford (born 1966), English actress
- Stanley Crawford (1937–2024), American writer
- Stanton Crawford (1897–1966), American academic administrator
- Steven Crawford (disambiguation), multiple people
- Stewart Crawford (1913–2002), British diplomat
- Stevie Crawford (born 1974), Scottish footballer
- Stuart Crawford (born 1981), Scottish squash player
- Sue Crawford (born 1967), American politician
- Susan Crawford (disambiguation), multiple people

=== T ===
- Tad Crawford (born 1984), Canadian football player
- Tammy Crawford (born 1974), Canadian soccer player
- Tarleton Perry Crawford (1921–1902), American missionary
- Terence Crawford (born 1987), American boxer
- Terence Crawford (actor), Australian actor
- Terrayne Crawford (born 1945), American actress
- Terri Crawford, Canadian musician
- Theo Crawford (1911–1993), British pathologist
- Therese Crawford (died 1970), Australian murder victim
- Therese Crawford (born 1976), American volleyball player
- Thom Crawford, Australian singer-songwriter
- Thomas Crawford (disambiguation), multiple people
- T. J. Crawford (c. 1877–1955), Scottish-born Canadian organist, conductor, and composer
- Tom Crawford (disambiguation), multiple people
- Tracey Crawford (born 1970), British radio presenter
- Tristan Crawford (born 1982), American-Australian baseball player
- Truman Crawford (1934–2003), American music arranger
- T. Stephen Crawford (1900–1987), American chemical engineer
- Tyrone Crawford (born 1989), Canadian football player

=== V ===
- Vernon Crawford (born 1974), American football player
- Vernon D. Crawford (1919–1994), Canadian professor
- Victoria Crawford (born 1986), American model and professional wrestler
- Victor Crawford (1932–1996), American politician and lawyer
- Vincent Crawford (born 1950), American economist
- Virginia Mary Crawford (1862–1948), British suffragist
- Vivian Crawford (1879–1922), English cricketer

=== W ===
- Walt Crawford, American writer
- Walter Crawford (1894–1978), Australian cricketer
- Wayne Crawford (1947–2016), American actor
- Wesley Crawford (1901–1961), American raceway driver
- Wilf Crawford (1915–1993), Scottish rugby union footballer
- William Crawford (disambiguation), multiple people
- Willie Crawford (1946–2004), American baseball player

=== X ===
- Xavier Crawford (born 1995), American football player

=== Y ===
- Yunaika Crawford (born 1982), Cuban hammer thrower

== People with the given name Crawford ==
- Crawford Allan (born 1967), Scottish football referee
- Crawford Anderson (1848–1930), New Zealand politician
- Crawford Ashley (born 1964), English boxer
- Crawford Baptie (born 1959), Scottish footballer
- Crawford Barton (1943–1994), American photographer
- Crawford Blagden (1881–1937), American football player
- Crawford Beveridge, Scottish businessman
- Crawford Boyd (born 1952), Scottish footballer
- Crawford Chamberlain (1821–1902), British-Indian Army officer
- Crawford Dunham (1965), American craftsman
- Crawford Fairbrother (1936–1986), Scottish high jumper
- Crawford Findlay (1871–??), Scottish rugby union footballer
- Crawford Gates (1921–2018), American composer
- Crawford Goldsby (1876–1896), American outlaw
- Crawford Gordon Jr. (1914–1967), Canadian industrialist
- Crawford Greene (1884–1959), English politician
- Crawford Greenewalt (1902–1993), American chemical engineer
- Crawford Hallock Greenewalt Jr. (1937–2012), American archaeologist
- Crawford Grimsley (born 1967), American boxer
- Crawford Henry (born 1937), American tennis player
- Crawford Ker (born 1962), American football player
- Crawford Kerr (1902–1950), British athlete
- Crawford Kilian (born 1941), Canadian novelist
- Crawford Logan, British actor
- Crawford Long (1815–1878), American surgeon
- Crawford Nalder (1910–1994), Australian politician
- Crawford Martin (1916–1972), American politician
- Crawford McCullagh (1868–1948), Irish politician
- Crawford Merkel (1906–1987), American bobsledder
- Crawford Mims (1933–2001), American football player
- Crawford Mitchell (1908–1976), Northern Irish artist
- Crawford Palmer (born 1970), American basketball player
- Crawford F. Parker (1906–1986), American politician
- Crawford Pasco (1818–1898), Australian naval officer
- Crawford Somerset (1895–1968), New Zealand teacher
- Crawford Symonds (1915–2000), Australian cricketer
- Crawford R. Thoburn (1862–1899), American missionary
- Crawford Howell Toy (1836–1919), American scholar
- Crawford Vaughan (1874–1947), Australian politician
- Crawford Wethington (1904–1994), American musician
- Crawford Young, Switzerland-based American lutenist and musicologist

== Fictional characters ==
- Crawford, a.k.a. The Gauntlet, a recurring villain of the Disney animated series Teamo Supremo
- Lana Crawford, in the soap opera Neighbours
- Mr. Crawford, a character from the American sitcom Herman's Head
- Henry Crawford, in the novel Mansfield Park
- Stella Crawford, in the soap opera EastEnders
- Miss Stephanie Crawford, the neighbourhood gossip in the novel To Kill a Mockingbird

== See also ==
- Earl of Crawford, title of Scottish nobility created in 1398
- Clan Crawford, Scottish clan
- Crawford (disambiguation), other things named Crawford
- Governor Crawford (disambiguation), a disambiguation page for governors surnamed "Crawford"
- Justice Crawford (disambiguation), a disambiguation page for justices surnamed "Crawford"
- Senator Crawford (disambiguation), a disambiguation page for senators surnamed "Crawford"
