= Katherine Crawford =

Katherine Crawford may refer to:

- Katherine B. Crawford (born 1966), an American historian
- Katherine Crawford (1970s actress)
- Kathryn Crawford (1908–1980), or Katherine Crawford, or Kitty Moran, an American actress of the 1920s and 1930s
- Katherine, a child victim of the Crawford family murder

== See also ==
- Kate Crawford, an Australian writer, composer, producer and academic
- Kathy Crawford (born 1942), an American author, business owner, and politician
- Katy Crawford (born 1987), an American Christian musician
