= Richard Crawford =

Richard or Rick Crawford may refer to:

- Richard Crawford (music historian) (1935–2024), American music historian
- Richard Crawford (director), British theatre director and actor
- Richard Crawford (American football) (born 1990), American football cornerback
- Richard Crawford (golfer) (born 1939), American golfer
- Richard Crawford (sport shooter) (born 1934), American Olympic sport shooter
- Rick Crawford (racing driver) (born 1958), American stock car racing driver
- Rick Crawford (politician) (born 1966), U.S. representative from Arkansas
- Rick Crawford (cycling), American cycling coach
