= Ian Crawford =

Ian Crawford may refer to:

- Ian Crawford (astrobiologist) (born 1961), professor of planetary science and astrobiology
- Ian Crawford (cricketer) (born 1954), English cricketer
- Ian Crawford (economist), professor of economics
- Ian Crawford (footballer) (1934–2007), Scottish football player and coach
- Ian Crawford (musician) (born 1989), American musician from Auburn, Washington
- Ian Crawford (admiral) (born 1930), see List of Australian admirals

== See also ==
- Iain Crawford (1928-2016), Scottish archaeologist
