= Edward Crawford =

Edward Crawford may refer to:

People

- Ed Crawford (born 1964), American lead singer of Firehose, also known as "ed fROMOHIO"
- Ed Crawford (American football) (1934–2017), American college athlete and NFL player
- Edward F. Crawford (attorney) (1919–1975), American lawyer and politician from New York
- Edward F. Crawford (businessman) (born 1938), American businessman and former U.S. Ambassador to Ireland
- Edward James Frederick Crawford (c. 1809–1880), South Australian brewer

Fictional characters

- Edward Crawford (EastEnders), of the BBC soap opera EastEnders

== See also ==
- Edward Crawford Magrath (1881–1961), English-born Australian politician
- Edward Crawford Turner (1872–1950), American lawyer
