= Robert Crawford =

Robert Crawford may refer to:

== Politicians ==
- Robert Crawford (died 1706), MP and governor of Sheerness
- Robert Wigram Crawford (1813–1889), British East India merchant, governor of the Bank of England and Liberal Party MP, 1857–1874
- Robert Crawford (Canadian politician) (1834–1897), member of the 1st Council of the Northwest Territories for Qu'Appelle from 1886 to 1888
- Robert Fitzgerald Crawford (died 1895), British general, father of Robert Copland-Crawford
- Robert Crawford (Antrim politician) (1847–1946), Ulster Unionist Party member of the Northern Ireland Parliament (MP) for Antrim then Mid Antrim
- Robert Lindsay Crawford (1868–1945), Irish Protestant politician and journalist
- Bob Crawford (Florida politician) (born 1948), Florida commissioner of agriculture
- Robert Stewart Crawford (1913–2002), British diplomat

== Sportspeople ==
- Robert Copland-Crawford (1852–1894), played for Scotland in the first international football match (son of Gen. Robert Crawford)
- Robert Crawford (Cambridge University cricketer) (1869–1917), English cricketer
- Bob Crawford, Scottish footballer, see List of Bury F.C. players (1–24 appearances)
- Robert Crawford (footballer) (1886–c. 1950), Liverpool footballer
- Bob Crawford (athlete) (1899–1970), American long-distance runner
- Bobby Crawford (footballer) (1901–1965), Scottish footballer
- Bob Crawford (ice hockey) (born 1959), Canadian ice hockey player
- Bobby Crawford (ice hockey) (born 1960), American ice hockey player
- Robbie Crawford (footballer, born 1993), Scottish footballer for Charleston Battery
- Robbie Crawford (footballer, born 1994), Scottish footballer for Livingston

== Writers ==
- Robert Crawford (Australian poet) (1868–1930), Australian poet
- Robert Crawford, pen-name of Hugh C. Rae (1935–2014), Scottish novelist and thriller writer
- Robert Crawford (Scottish poet) (born 1959), Scottish poet, scholar and critic

== Other people ==
- Robert H. Crawford (died 1942), American founder of Acme Markets
- Robert W. Crawford (general) (1891–1981), U.S. Army general
- Robert MacArthur Crawford (1899–1961), composer who wrote the U.S. Air Force song
- Robert Wilson Crawford (1906–1995), American parks and recreation professional
- Robert Crawford (composer) (1925–2012), Scottish classical composer, who worked with Ilona Kabos
- Bob Crawford (photographer) (1939–2015), American photojournalist
- Robert Hugh Crawford (died 1930), horse judge and businessman in South Australia
- Robert Crawford (psychiatrist) (1941–2021), New Zealand psychiatrist
- Robert L. Crawford Jr. (born 1944), American television actor and film producer
- Robert Crawford (historian) (born 1945), director of the Imperial War Museum

== See also ==
- Robert Crawford Johnson (1882–1937), English inventor of the cube teapot
