= Roger Crawford =

Roger Crawford may refer to:

- Roger Crawford (tennis) (born 1960), American tennis player
- Roger Crawford (politician) (born 1952), member of the Minnesota House of Representatives
- Roger Crawford (activist) (born 1948), author and fathers rights activist
