= Joel Crawford =

Joel Crawford may refer to:

- Joel Crawford (director), American story artist and film director
- Joel Crawford (politician) (1783–1858), American politician, soldier and lawyer

== See also ==
- Joseph Crawford (disambiguation)
