= Ken Crawford =

Ken Crawford may refer to:

- Ken Crawford (American football) (1898–1957), American football player
- Ken Crawford (baseball) (1894–1976), Major League baseball player
- Ken Crawford (astrophotographer), American astrophotographer
- Sir Kenneth Crawford (1895–1961), British Army general
- Kenneth G. Crawford (1902–1983), American journalist for PM newspaper and Newsweek magazine
