= Alan Crawford =

Alan Crawford may refer to:

- Alan Crawford (Australian rules footballer) (1916–1988), Australian rules footballer
- Alan Crawford (English footballer) (born 1953), English footballer and manager
- Alan Pell Crawford (born 1953), American author and journalist
- Allan Crawford (music publisher) Australian music publisher who formed the sales and programming company for Radio Atlanta

== See also ==
- Allen Crawford (born 1968), author and illustrator
