= Thomas Crawford =

Thomas or Tom Crawford may refer to:

== Politicians ==
- Thomas Crawford (Canadian politician) (1852–1932), Canadian politician
- Thomas Crawford (Australian politician) (1865–1948), Australian senator
- Thomas Crawford (Wisconsin politician) (born 1952), Wisconsin politician
- Thomas Hartley Crawford (1786–1863), U.S. congressman from Pennsylvania
- Thomas H. Crawford (1803–1871), Louisville mayor
- Thomas Simpson Crawford (1875–1976), Australian politician

== Sportspeople ==
- Tom Crawford (Australian footballer) (1879–1964), Australian footballer
- Tom Crawford (English footballer) (born 1999), English footballer
- Tom Crawford (cricketer) (1910–1979), Kent cricketer

== Other ==
- Thomas Crawford of Jordanhill (1530–1603), Scottish military strategist and Provost of Glasgow
- Thomas Crawford (sculptor) (1814–1857), American sculptor from New York
- Thomas Jackson Crawford (1812–1875), Scottish minister and professor of divinity
- T. J. Crawford (Thomas J. Crawford, c. 1877–1955), Scottish-born Canadian organist, conductor, and composer
- T. Stephen Crawford, American chemical engineer
- Thomas Jefferson Crawford, a member of the Crawford family of the White Mountains
- Thomas Crawford, conductor and artistic director of the American Classical Orchestra
- Tom Crawford (mathematician), British mathematician and YouTuber
- Thom Crawford, Australian alternative music singer and songwriter
