= Senator Crawford =

Senator Crawford may refer to:

== Members of the United States Senate ==
- Coe I. Crawford (1858–1944), U.S. Senator from South Dakota from 1909 to 1915
- William H. Crawford (1772–1834), U.S. Senator from Georgia from 1807 to 1813

== United States state senate members ==
- Bob Crawford (Florida politician) (born 1948), Florida State Senate
- James J. Crawford (1871–1954), New York State Senate
- Joel Crawford (politician) (1783–1858), Georgia State Senate
- John L. Crawford (died 1902), Florida State Senate
- Michelee Crawford (born 1983), Nevada State Senate
- Sandy Crawford (born 1957), Missouri State Senate
- Sarah Crawford (politician) (born 1980/81), North Carolina State Senate
- Sue Crawford (born 1967), Nebraska State Senate
- Theophilus Crawford (1806–1877), Iowa State Senate
- Victor Crawford (1932–1996), Maryland State Senate
- William Crawford (judge) (1784–1849), Alabama State Senate

== See also ==
- Robert Sharman-Crawford (1853–1934), Northern Irish Senator from 1921 to 1934
