= Steven Crawford =

Steven, Stephen, Steve or Stevie Crawford may refer to:

- Steve Crawford (Pennsylvania politician) (born 1959), chief of staff for former Pennsylvania Governor Ed Rendell
- Steve Crawford (baseball) (born 1958), American baseball player
- Stevie Crawford (born 1974), Scottish footballer
- T. Stephen Crawford (1900–1987), American chemical engineer
- Stephen Crawford (politician), Canadian politician
