= Gary Crawford =

Gary Crawford may refer to:

- Gary William Crawford (1953–2020), American writer
- Gary Crawford (politician) (born 1960), Canadian politician
- Gary Crawford (actor) in Police Academy (TV series)
- Gary Crawford (skier) (born 1957), Olympic skier

== See also ==
- Garry Crawford (born 1972), sociologist
