= Reginald Crawford =

Reginald Crawford may refer to:

- Reginald Crawford (died 1307), Scottish knight
- Reginald Crawford (cricketer) (1882–1945)

== See also ==
- Barns of Ayr
- Clan Crawford
- Crawford (surname)
