= Aaron Crawford =

Arron or Aaron Crawford may refer to:

- Arron Crawford (born 1983), Western Australian cricketer
- Aaron Crawford (Canadian football) (born 1986), CFL long snapper
- Aaron Crawford (American football) (born 1997), NFL defensive tackle
- Aaron Jamal Crawford (born 1980), American basketball player
- Aaron Crawford, American drummer with post-hardcore band Flee the Seen from 2003 to 2009
