= Brian Crawford =

Brian Crawford may refer to:

- Brian Crawford (footballer) (born 1978), Scottish football striker
- Brian Crawford (politician) (1926–2004), Australian politician
