= Robbie Crawford =

Robbie Crawford may refer to:

- Robbie Crawford (footballer, born 1993), Scottish footballer for Charleston Battery
- Robbie Crawford (footballer, born 1994), Scottish footballer for Greenock Morton

== See also ==
- Robert Crawford (disambiguation)
