= Hugh Crawford =

Hugh Crawford may refer to:

- Hugh Crawford (politician) (born 1941), Michigan politician
- Hugh Crawford (sheriff) (1195–1265), Sheriff of Ayrshire, Chief of Clan Crawford and Lord of Loudon Castle
- Hugh Adam Crawford (1898–1982), Scottish painter
- Hugh Alexander Crawford (1873–1951), Michigan politician
- Hugh Archibald Crawford (c. 1824–1881), South Australian businessman
- Hugh Ralston Crawford (1876–1954), engineer and architect in Australia and the United States
- Hugh Crawford (1813 ship)

== See also ==
- Crawford (name)
- Crawford (disambiguation)
