= Ronald Crawford =

Ronald Crawford may refer to:

- Ronald Crawford (soccer), South African football player
- Ronald Crawford (water polo) (1939–2015), American water polo player
- Ronald Crawford (racewalker) (1936–2018), Australian racewalker
- Ron Crawford (born 1945), American actor and artist
- Sir Ronald Crawford, Scottish knight who may have been hanged at the Barns of Ayr
