= Alexander Crawford =

Alexander Crawford may refer to:

- Alexander Crawford (cricketer) (1891–1916), English cricketer
- Alexander Crawford (sailor) (1842–1886), American sailor
- Alexander Hunter Crawford (1865–1945), Scottish businessman

== See also ==
- Alex Crawford (born 1962), British journalist
- Alexander Crawfurd, 16th-century Scottish shoemaker
