= Frank Crawford (disambiguation) =

Frank Crawford (1870–1963) was an American college football coach and later a professor of law.

Frank Crawford may also refer to:

- Frank Crawford (Australian rules footballer) (1887–1943), Australian rules footballer
- Frank Fairbairn Crawford (1850–1900), British Army officer and first-class cricketer
- Frank Linke-Crawford (1893–1918), Austro-Hungarian military aviator of mixed Austro-Polish (Galician) and British heritage
- Vivian Crawford (1879–1922), English cricketer, known as "Frank" during his playing career
