= Alexander Crawford (cricketer) =

English cricketer

Alexander Basil Crawford (24 May 1891 – 10 May 1916) was an English cricketer who played first-class cricket for Warwickshire in the Championship-winning side of 1911 and for Nottinghamshire in 1912. He was born at Coleshill, Warwickshire and died in the fighting of the First World War at Laventie and Richebourg, France.

== Cricket career ==
Crawford was a tall lower-order right-handed batsman and a right-arm fast-medium bowler. He played second eleven cricket for Nottinghamshire in 1909 and 1910, he was picked for Warwickshire, for whom he had a birth qualification, for the match against the Indians in 1911 and, having made an unbeaten 24 in his only innings, batting at No 10, he took six second-innings wickets for just 36 runs, which proved to be the best bowling return of his brief career. He then appeared in six further Championship matches, four of them won by Warwickshire on their way to their first Championship title, in which he contributed no outstanding figures, but useful runs and wickets, though he bowled a lot of no-balls as well.

In 1912, instead of playing for Warwickshire, Crawford turned out instead in around half of Nottinghamshire's games – he was qualified for the county through residence. Regarded by his new county less as a bowler and more as a batsman, he had one day of success, making 51 against the Australians in a game won by the county. Wisden Cricketers' Almanack noted that "Crawford hit with great power"; in its Nottinghamshire notes for the season, however, Wisden was rather dismissive of Crawford, saying that he was "just a hard hitter and nothing more". He did not play any further county cricket after 1912.

== Outside cricket ==
Crawford's father was a former army medical doctor who settled at Skegby, Nottinghamshire. Crawford went to school at Oundle School and then qualified as a solicitor; he practised at Boston, Lincolnshire. On the outbreak of war in 1914, he joined the Lincolnshire Regiment as a private, accepting a commission with the Sherwood Foresters six months later and then transferring to the West Yorkshire Regiment, where he was a captain at the time of his death. His obituary states that he was 6 ft 4in tall and was also a rugby player for Nottingham Rugby Club.
