= Vernon D. Crawford =

American university president (1919–1994)

- Crawford, c. 1967
- Born: February 13, 1919; Amherst, Nova Scotia
- Died: September 27, 1994 (aged 75)
- Education: Mount Allison University, Dalhousie University, University of Virginia
- Scientific career
- Fields: physics
- Workplaces: Georgia Institute of Technology

Vernon D'Orsay Crawford (February 13, 1919 - September 27, 1994) was a professor, dean, and later interim president at the Georgia Institute of Technology from March 1969 to August 1969, and later chancellor of the University System of Georgia from 1979 to 1985.

== Early life and education ==
Crawford was born February 13, 1919, in Amherst, Nova Scotia. His father was a schoolteacher.

He earned his Bachelor of Science degree in physics from Mount Allison University in 1939. He then earned his Master of Science degree from Dalhousie University in 1944. Finally, he earned his Ph.D. in physics at the University of Virginia in 1949.

He became a naturalized citizen of the United States in 1953.

== Career ==
Crawford taught at Mount Allison University from 1937 to 1949.

Crawford was a professor, dean, and later interim president at the Georgia Institute of Technology from March 1969 to August 1969. He was chancellor of the 34-campus University System of Georgia from 1979 to 1985.

He was a member of the American Physical Society.

== Awards and memberships ==
Crawford was a member of the honorary societies of Sigma Xi, Sigma Pi Sigma, and Phi Kappa Phi, Omicron Delta Kappa, and The ANAK Society at Georgia Tech. He received an honorary degree from Mount Allison University in 1975.

Partly due to their status as benefactors of Georgia Tech, the pool at the Georgia Tech Campus Recreation Center is named in honor of Vernon and his wife Helen.

== Personal life ==
Crawford was married to Helen Avison. They had two daughters, Dell and Lynn.

Crawford was chairman of the board of Literacy Action in Atlanta. He was a member of the Georgia Coalition for Excellence in Mathematics Education.

Crawford died of cancer on September 27, 1994, in his home in Atlanta, Georgia at the age of 75.
