= Neil Crawford =

Neil Crawford may refer to:

- Neil Crawford (cricketer) (born 1958), English cricketer
- Neil Stanley Crawford (1931–1992), politician and jazz musician from Alberta, Canada
