= Brad Crawford =

Brad Crawford may refer to:

- Brad Crawford (American football) (1955–2023), American football defensive back and inductee of the College Football Hall of Fame
- Brad Crawford (Canadian football) (born 1987), Canadian football defensive back
