= Peter Crawford =

Peter Crawford may refer to:

- Peter Crawford (filmmaker), British filmmaker, author, photographer and lecturer
- Peter Crawford (basketball) (born 1979), Australian international basketball player
- Peter Crawford (Australian politician) (born 1949), politician from New South Wales
- Peter Crawford, pre-Civil War politician from Georgia and father of Georgia governor George W. Crawford
- Peter Crawford, 13 times UK spearfishing champion
- Peter Crawford (land surveyor) (1818–1888), Scottish-born land surveyor and pioneer in the Pacific Northwest.
