= Maria Crawford =

American geologist

Maria Luisa (Weecha) Crawford was an American geologist/petrologist. She was born on July 18, 1939, in Beverly, Massachusetts, and died on November 4, 2023, in Haverford, PA Obituary. In 1960, Crawford received a bachelor of arts degree in geology from Bryn Mawr College, located in Pennsylvania. 5 years later, she received her doctorate degree from the University of California at Berkeley, where she met her husband, William Crawford. Shortly after graduating, Crawford became employed by Bryn Mawr College in the department of geology. Throughout her career, she had a wide range of interests. She was known to be one of the first scientists to use the electron micro probe on metamorphic rocks. Crawford has also been interested in lunar petrology and geochemistry. In this field, she researched the crystallization of lava that seemed to fill craters on the moon.

== Personal interests ==
Maria Luisa Crawford first became interested in geoscience after taking an introductory geology class to fill her science option requirement at Bryn Mawr College. This sparked interest led her to dedicate her life to the geoscience field. In 1960, Crawford took a year off between her undergraduate and graduate studies in which she travelled to Norway. This introduction to travel began a lifelong passion that led her to study in the remote areas of Alaska and British Columbia. Upon her return to graduate school Crawford met her husband, fellow geologist, William A. Crawford. The two married while in graduate school and worked together, teaching geology, at Bryn Mawr. Despite retiring from Bryn Mawr College in 2006, Crawford has remained an active member of the geoscience community. Her passion for travel and geology motivates her to continue working with school groups and undergraduate students. Today she often travels with student groups to many different countries to study geology.

Crawford is also an advocate for women in science. She and her husband founded the Crawford Field Camp Scholarship, awarded by the Association of Women Geoscientists to women pursuing careers in geoscience. Being one of few women in her field, she recognizes the difficulty of working in a male-dominated profession and uses her experience to mentor and open doors for young women.

== Education ==
As previously mentioned Maria Luisa Crawford first attended Bryn Mawr College in Pennsylvania, where she took a geology class as an option but realized she really enjoyed it, so she eventually switched her major to geology. In 1960, Crawford graduated with a Bachelor of Arts degree in geology from Bryn Mawr College. In 1960–1961, she did a Fulbright Fellowship at the University of Oslo in Norway before she began her graduate studies. While in Norway, she also worked for a museum and helped with mineralogical studies. Crawford enjoyed graduate school mostly because she was able to learn and focus on metamorphic petrology. In 1965 she received her doctorate from the University of California, Berkeley. Shortly after, she became a geology professor at Bryn Mawr College and in 1985–1992 and was named the William R. Kenan Jr. Eminent Professor of Geology.

== Career ==
In her 40 year long career, Maria Luisa Crawford wrote 68 separate articles in various journals. Her area of research changed several times throughout her career. However, the majority of Crawford's work centered around gaining an understanding of past geological processes related to Earth's crust. There was a period of time when Crawford became very interested in lunar petrology. She was involved in the study of several Moon rocks that had been retrieved during the Apollo missions. By studying these rocks she was able to determine that sometime in the Moon's history large meteorites struck its surface causing flood lavas. The work she did with lunar rocks is still mentioned in lunar studies to this day.

Later in her career she was involved in the ACCRETE study conducted in Alaska and British Columbia. This study was a shift from the lunar petrology she had worked on previously. This time she was studying continental collision. This research was part of a larger study which detailed how a series of collisions between fragments of continents can build an entirely new continent. Overall, the geological community accepted and praised the ACCRETE study.

Another major area of research that Crawford took on was the geology of the Pennsylvania Piedmont. She conducted a series of tests on the rocks in the area with the help of several graduate students. In 2002, she became involved in a project that combined the expertise of geoscientists and computer scientists. This project was given the name GEON; its goal was to create a database that would combine geological data from several other unaffiliated databases. At the time, geologists had to search through several databases and then combine this information together in order to conduct their research. This project was thought to have the potential to entirely change how geoscientific research was done. Crawford was given a National Science Foundation grant because of the role she played in the GEON project.

Maria Crawford was also an environmental science and geology professor at Bryn Mawr College for a period of time. She began with the college in 1965 when she was hired to be an assistant professor. It wasn't until 1979 that she earned a position as a full-time professor. While at Bryn Mawr College she began research on the evolution of convergent continental margin orogenic belts; she retired from this position in 2006. She was also notably a member of the Association of Women Geoscientists during her time as a professor; as part of this association she received the Outstanding Educator Award.

== Awards and honors ==
- 1992 Professor in Science and Environmental Studies
- 1988 Association for Women Geoscientists Foundation, Outstanding Educator Award
- 1988 National Science Foundation Visiting Professorship
- 1985-92 William R. Kenan Jr. Professorship
- 1993-98 MacArthur Fellowship
- 1960 Woodrow Wilson Fellowship

== Works ==
- "A bimodal volcanic–plutonic system: the Zarembo Island extrusive suite and the Burnett Inlet intrusive complex". Lindline, Jennifer, Crawford, W.A. and Crawford, M.L., Canadian Journal of Earth Sciences, v. 41, p. 355-375.
- "Using incongruent, equilibrium hydration reactions to model latter-stage crystallization in plutons: examples from the Bell Island tonalite, Alaska". Beard, J.S., Ragland, P.C., and Crawford, M.L. Journal of Geology, v. 113, 589–599.
- "Reactive bulk assimilation: A model for crust-mantle mixing in silicic magmas". Beard, J.S., Ragland, P.C., and Crawford, M.L. Geology: v. 33, 681–684.
- "105 million years of igneous activity, Wrangell, Alaska, to Prince Rupert, British Columbia". Crawford, M.L., Crawford, W.A. and Lindline, J. Canadian Journal of Earth Sciences, v. 42, p. 1097-1116.
- "Paleomagnetism of Late Jurassic to mid-Cretaceous plutons near Prince Rupert, British Columbia". Butler, R.F., Gehrels, G.E., Hart, W., Davidson, C. and Crawford, M.L. In: Haggart, J.W., Enkin, R.J., Monger, J.W.H., eds., Paleogeography of the North American Cordillera; evidence for and against large-scale displacements. Geological Association of Canada Special Paper, vol. 46, pp. 171–200, 2006
