= Amanda Crawford =

Amanda Crawford may refer to:

- Amanda Crawford (footballer) (born 1971), association football player for New Zealand
- Amanda Crawford (sprinter) (born 1999), American born, Grenadian sprinter
