= Brian Crawford (footballer) =

Scottish footballer

Personal information
- Date of birth: 27 July 1978 (age 48)
- Place of birth: Lanark, Scotland
- Position: Striker

Team information
- Current team: Larkhall Thistle F.C. (manager)

Senior career*
Years	Team	Apps	(Gls)
2000	Cumbernauld United		
2000–2002	Clyde	42	(18)
2002–2003	Stenhousemuir	39	(15)
2003–2005	Stranraer	22	(6)
2005–2007	Shotts Bon Accord		
- Forth Wanderers
- * Club domestic league appearances and goals as of 17:38, 8 January 2009 (UTC)

Brian Crawford (born 27 July 1978) is a Scottish former football striker.

Crawford began his career with junior side Carluke Rovers, before moving to Fauldhouse United and then to Cumbernauld United. Crawford's good form saw him earn a move to the senior game, joining Clyde in December 2000. He has made 42 appearances in total for the Bully Wee, scoring 18 goals. He joined Stenhousemuir in May 2002. This was followed by a spell at Stranraer, before he returned to the juniors, signing for Shotts Bon Accord in 2005. He scored 32 goals in 26 games but unfortunately in September of that year he had cruciate injury and was out for the best part of a year. He returned after this time out only to sustain the same injury which effectively ended his career at the age of 27.
