= Crawford R. Thoburn =

American clergyman

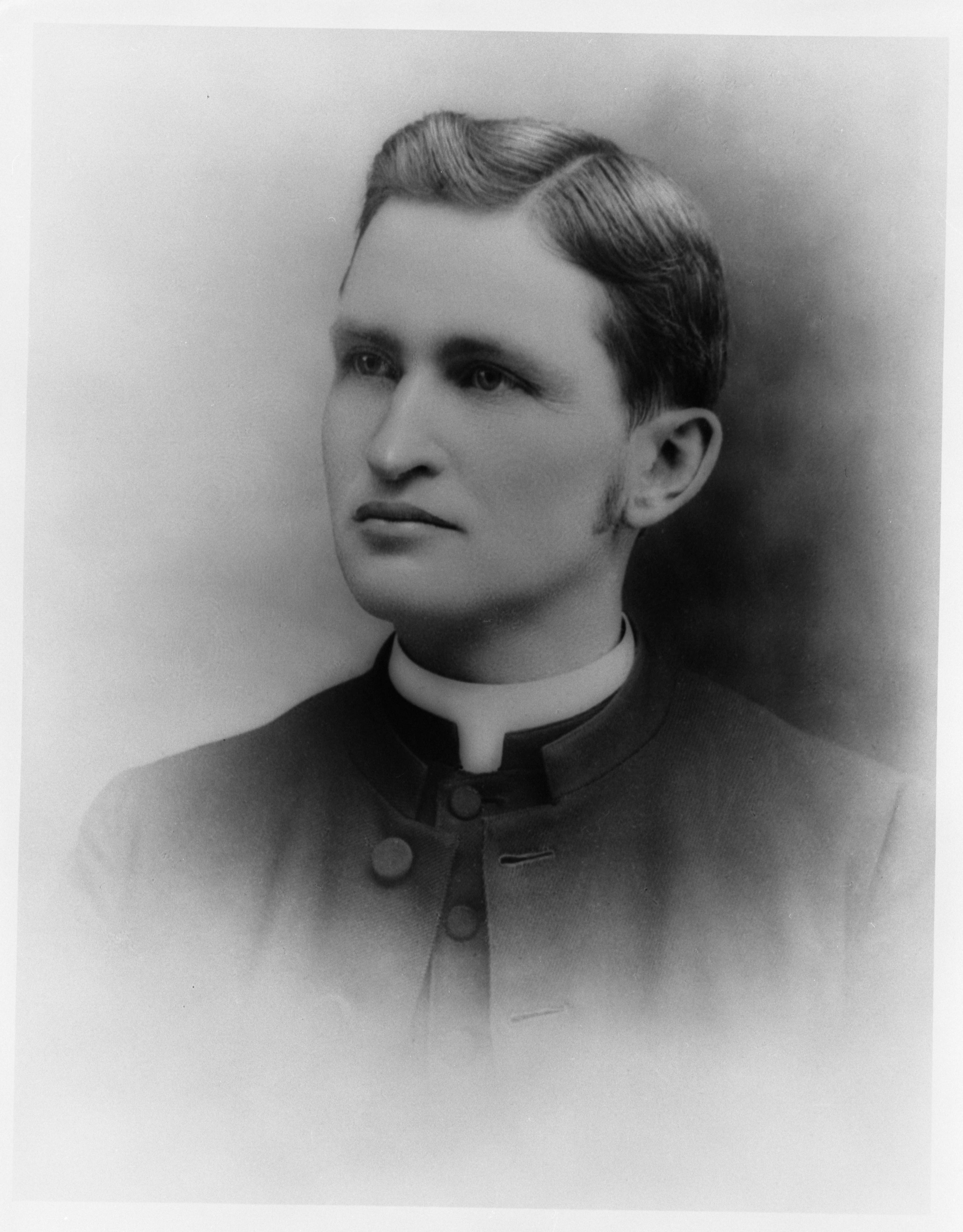
Portrait of Crawford Thoburn President Chancellor 1892-1898

Crawford Rockwell Thoburn (1862–1899) was an American Methodist minister and missionary.

== Early life ==
Reverend Crawford Rockwell Thoburn was born in Nainital, India in 1862 to Bishop James M. Thoburn and Minerva Rockwell Thoburn. His mother died shortly after his birth, and Thoburn’s father, Bishop Thoburn, returned to America when Crawford Thoburn was about a year old, leaving him with grandparents Dr. Rockwell and his wife, in Evanston, Illinois. After the death of his grandparents, Thoburn was cared for by an Uncle, James Wilson, in Bellaire, Ohio.

== Early career ==
Thoburn attended Allegheny College and graduated in 1885. After graduating, Thoburn entered the Methodist Conference and in 1886, he was sent to India as a missionary, where he was stationed at Bombay.

== Career in the Northwest ==
After less than three years, Thoburn returned from India in poor health, and worked for a time recruiting in Kansas before joining the Puget Sound Conference. After several years in the conference, he was chosen to be the Chancellor of Puget Sound University (now University of Puget Sound), in Tacoma, Washington. Thoburn served as the head of the university from 1892-1898. When the school was consolidated with the University of Portland, Thoburn moved to Portland but only stayed on as the Chancellor for another 8 months before accepting the pastorate of Centenary Church in Portland.

== Family ==
Thoburn married Adelaide Spencer Bennett on April 3, 1889 in Hutchinson, Kansas. Adelaide Bennett had previously been a schoolmate in Meadville, PA, and the couple had four children at the time of Thoburn’s death.
