= Sonya Crawford =

Korean-born former broadcast journalist

Sonya Crawford Bearson is a Korean-born former broadcast journalist who worked for ABC News as a special-events anchor and correspondent in Washington, D.C. from 2002 until 2007.

== Early life ==
Born in Seoul, South Korea, the daughter of American missionary Dave Crawford and Korean Sue Hong, she grew up in Seoul before studying at Stanford University where she obtained a bachelor's degree in political science and communication.

== Career ==
She worked as a television reporter for Korean Broadcasting System (KBS), covering the 1988 Summer Olympics in Seoul and later as a reporter for Seoul Broadcasting System covering the 1992 Summer Olympics in Barcelona, Spain.

From 1993 to 1994 she was a reporter and assistant producer on Public Radio International's Marketplace, which she followed by three years as Associate Producer of Dateline NBC in Los Angeles. In 1999 she worked for reporter and substitute anchor for NBC's KNBC-TV in Los Angeles. In November 2001 she started at ABC news as Washington-based correspondent, where she worked until leaving to raise a family in June 2007.

Major events covered by Sonya Crawford include the 2004 Republican National Convention, the funeral of US President Ronald Reagan, the Iraq War, the funeral of Pope John Paul II and the election of his successor Pope Benedict XVI.

== Other activities ==
She was a national board member of the Asian American Journalists Association and was on the board of directors of Lionshare, a Christian organization. In 2005, she married Darren Bearson, the executive director of a Christian discipleship ministry.
