= Samuel Crawford =

Samuel or Sam Crawford may refer to:

- Samuel J. Crawford (1835–1913), U.S. Army general and third Governor of Kansas
- Samuel W. Crawford (1829–1892), U.S. Army surgeon and general
- Samuel Crawford (Illinois politician), 19th century Illinois state representative
- Samuel Crawford (jurist) (1820–1860), American jurist
- Sam Crawford (1880–1968), American baseball Hall of Fame outfielder
- Sam Crawford (basketball) (born 1970), American basketball player
- Sam Crawford (pitcher) (1892–?), American pitcher and manager in baseball's Negro leagues
- Rusty Crawford (1885–1971), Canadian ice hockey player
