= Dean Crawford (author) =

British author

Dean Crawford is a British author of action and adventure, science fiction and thriller books.

He intended to qualify as a fighter pilot in the Royal Air Force, but failed the sight test, and worked as a graphic designer before leaving the industry to write novels. He spent fifteen years writing full-time before his first successful book, Covenant, was published in 2011. He signed a three-book contract with US publishers Simon & Schuster, but subsequently set up his own independent publishing company Fictum Limited, through which he has released over thirty self-published novels.

== Books (with first publication dates) ==
=== Ethan Warner series ===
1. Covenant (11 November 2011)
2. Immortal (8 May 2012)
3. Apocalypse (8 November 2012)
4. The Chimera Secret (18 July 2013)
5. The Eternity Project (19 December 2013)

=== Atlantia series ===
(writing under the pen-name of D.C.Ford)

1. Survivor (31 March 2014)
2. Retaliator (6 June 2014)
3. Aggressor (19 September 2014)
4. Endeavour (20 November 2014)
5. Defiance (17 April 2015)

=== Ethan Warner and Nicola Lopez series ===
(a continuation of the Ethan Warner series, but published by Fictum Limited)

1. The Nemesis Origin (3 February 2015)
2. The Fusion Cage (1 June 2015)
3. The Identity Mine (7 August 2015)
4. The Black Knight (26 October 2015)
5. The Extinction Code (2 May 2016)
6. The Genesis Cypher (21 October 2016)
7. The Atlantis Codex (8 June 2017)
8. The Disclosure Protocol (3 May 2018)
9. Vanishing Point (13 November 2018) – a prequel novel
10. Event Horizon (1 May 2019)

=== Old Ironsides series ===
1. Old Ironsides (1 February 2016)
2. Titan (14 July 2016)
3. Predator (27 February 2017)

=== Power Reads Series ===
- Altitude (18 July 2017)
- Deadline (3 February 2018)
- Revolution (19 December 2013)
- Eden (24 July 2013)
- Stone Cold (10 March 2015)
- Holo Sapiens (21 November 2013) – a.k.a. After Life

=== Alya Fox series ===
- Alya Fox and the Mirror of Souls (23 February 2018)

=== Tyler Griffin series ===
- First Strike (23 August 2018)

=== Children's novels ===
- Soul Seekers (29 January 2015)

=== Non-fiction ===
- Blockbuster (2016)
