= Fred Crawford =

Fred Crawford or Frederick Crawford may refer to:

- Fred Crawford (Alabama politician), Alabama Secretary of State in 1989
- Fred Crawford (American football) (1910–1974), American football player
- Fred L. Crawford (1888–1957), American politician
- Freddie Crawford (born 1941), basketball player
- Sir Frederick Crawford (colonial administrator) (1906–1978), British colonial administrator
- Frederick C. Crawford (1891–1994), American industrialist and philanthropist
- Frederick H. Crawford (1861–1952), Ulster Unionist Council agent who organised the Larne gun-running operation in 1914
