= Colin Crawford =

Colin Crawford may refer to:

- Colin Crawford (academic) (born 1958), American academic and law-school administrator
- Colin Crawford (mountaineer) (1890–1959), British mountaineer
- Colin Crawford (politician) (fl. 21st century), Northern Irish politician
- Col Crawford (1913–2007), Australian rules footballer
