= Fergus Crawford =

Irish footballer

Personal information
- Date of birth: 1934
- Place of birth: Dublin, Ireland
- Position: Left-back

Youth career
- 1950–1951: Bulfin United

Senior career*
Years	Team	Apps	(Gls)
1951–1959	St Patrick's Athletic	57	(1)
1959–1961	Limerick	28	(0)

International career
	League of Ireland XI	13	(0)
- * Club domestic league appearances and goals

Fergus Crawford (1934–1985) was an Irish professional footballer. Crawford was brought up on the Phibsboro Road in Dublin, Ireland, in the shadow of Dalymount Park.

== Career ==
Crawford's football career started when he was instructed by the local constabulary to stop playing football on the roads. The local Phoenix Park provided a safer place to kickabout and he was soon spotted there by scouts from Bulfin United, a feeder club for St Patrick's Athletic. Crawford soon moved on to St.Patricks and whilst there he achieved several major honours including LFA President's Cup, FAI Intermediate Cup, two League of Ireland winners medals (1954–55 and 1955–56), and an FAI Cup runners up medal in 1954.

He played many times for the League of Ireland XI in games that at that time were regarded as the equivalent of full internationals. After a 1952 game against the Football League XI, when as a 19-year-old he marked Stanley Matthews, he received excellent reviews for his mature performance and refusal to be drawn to the tackle. Matthews himself heaped praise upon the young Crawford.

He was picked for the full international squad on more than one occasion but did not receive a full international cap despite having "warmed the bench", most notably against Yugoslavia in 1955. He was incredibly unlucky in that regard as at that time only one substitution was allowed.

Crawford founded the Professional Footballers Association of Ireland with the help of the legendary English footballer Jimmy Hill during the 1950s. This association remains active today in promoting the welfare of Irish soccer players.

Following a contractual dispute with St.Pats that kept him out of football for almost two years he returned to League of Ireland football for the 1959 - 1960 season with Limerick F.C. This was despite offers from big English clubs including Arsenal. It proved a great move for Limerick as, for the first of only two times in their history, they won the League championship.

Crawford is fondly remembered by many soccer fans as a cultured and lightning fast fullback, regarded by many to the best Irish player in that position never to play a full international. He lived quietly in his native Dublin following the end of his career and died at home aged 51 in Dublin in August 1985 following a long illness and in the presence of his family.
