= Chris Crawford =

Chris Crawford may refer to:

- Chris Crawford (basketball, born 1975), American professional basketball player with the Atlanta Hawks from 1997 to 2005
- Chris Crawford (basketball, born 1992), American professional basketball player
- Chris Crawford (game designer) (born 1950), American computer game developer
- Chris Crawford (dancer), American dancer and professional cheerleader
- Christopher Crawford (tennis) (1939–2012), American tennis player

== See also ==
- Christina Crawford (born 1939), American actress
