= Richard Crawford (director) =

British theatre director and actor

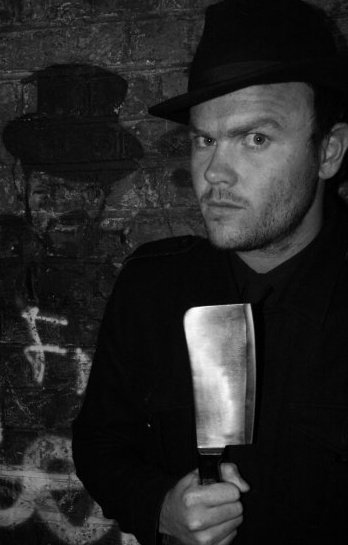
- Richard Crawford directing Edward Scissorhands in 2010
- Born: Scotland, United Kingdom
- Occupation(s): Theatre director, actor
- Notable work: Reservoir Dogs, Edward Scissorhands, Freakazoid, Hamlet, Redemption Room, The Great Gatsby

Richard Crawford is a British theatre director and actor known for the Secret Theatre Project. His productions are typically site specific and immersive. He is credited for pioneering immersive theatrical productions such as Reservoir Dogs in London, Fight Club in Hong Kong and Edward Scissorhands in New York.

== Career ==
Recent career highlights include The New York Secret which he wrote and directed and opened in Singapore in 2024, with Vogue Magazine stating "The evening feels less like a theatre production, and more like a specially themed night at the club—the biggest testament, perhaps, to Secret Theatre’s approach to immersion. As the line between theatre and nightlife blurs, it’s easy to forget you’re in a play, and instead just let loose and enjoy a spectacular night out." His 2021 live online cinematic experience Redemption Room, which won Best Virtual experience at the SCAR Awards.

Lifestyle Asia previewed the show "The story goes: Six disgraced celebrities — in true Black Mirror-style — faces the live, virtual-studio audience as they seek redemption for their so-called ‘crimes’ — from sexual harassment and the consumption of illicit drugs to lying, cheating and other behaviours that warrant cancellation. To be ‘redeemed’, the celebrity must confront — in accordance to the audience's votes — their greatest fear — be it spiders, ghosts or Ouija boards. An evil entity disrupts the evening. Chaos ensues.

Crawford wrote and directed the show which was well received across the world, with chief culture critic from The Guardian Arifa Akbar stating the show "delivers a satisfying adrenaline high" Nick Curtis at London's Evening Standard was especially impressed stating "Less than a week ago I wrote off online games that pretend to be “immersive theatre experiences” as a waste of time. Now here comes this thrillingly macabre mashup of horror film, gameshow and Zoom meeting, to prove me wrong. If you want something different and genuinely hair-raising, I can wholeheartedly recommend Redemption Room. Even if it does mean facing a critic's worst fear: eating my words."

The show was also a success in Australia and America with Sydney based culture critic Kate Herbert stating "You can’t escape the Dark Entity in Redemption Room, a wild, hilarious and, by the end, scary live and interactive theatre experience." New York critic Ryan Davis agreed stating "Redemption Room combines the clever premise of horror movies like Anonymous Killers and Circle, and effectively rivals other online scare fests like Host with sheer theatricality and impressive stagecraft.

He is the Artistic Director of the Brooklyn Studio Lab, a collective of film and theatre artists based in Willamsburg, New York, and he is also a founding member of The New York Rebel Film Club.

== Productions ==
In 2022 Crawford wrote and directed a new immersive theatrical experience, Nights at Studio 54 which ran for a record breaking 3 months in Hong Kong. The production was set on the last night of the infamous club and included many celebrities of the era. Crawford had expressed "“It’s a dream of mine to travel back to Studio 54—I have been obsessed with that particular time in New York for a while and have always wanted to create a show set in that era,”

In 2022 Crawford adapted, directed and acted in The Great Gatsby in the Spanish capital Madrid, his first production in Spanish. The production was one of the first signature immersive productions to take place in the city and was a critical success with La Razon stating "“What Secret Theatre has achieved is not just a representation of the work of F.Scott Fitzgerald. It is in fact, a pioneering way of doing theatre in Spain, and one that places the city at the forefront of culture.”

In 2021 Crawford adapted, directed and starred in Secret Theatre's immersive, site specific The Great Gatsby in Hong Kong. The production opened to much hype in the city, featured as Vogue Magazine's show to see, and Tatler Magazine's event of the quarter. The production went on to sell out in record time for the city and became the most successful International production in 2021.

He directed the Brooklyn Studio Lab's world premiere of Edward Scissorhands in New York in 2010.

In 2015 Crawford produced and directed the world stage premier of SE7EN (Deadly Sins) in London and Hong Kong. The production featured on the front cover of Time Out

2015 also saw the Crawford-produced Secret Studio Lab Romeo and Juliet on a secret Island in London. Evanesce, was written and directed by Crawford and performed in a disused police station in London in 2015.

In 2018 he signed up to open a new production in Singapore.

The production in Singapore went on to become the Singapore Tatler Magazine Number 1 show getting rave reviews from publications such as Honeycombers, "Here's the takeaway: the Secret Theatre Project is one wild ride you won't want to miss."

His production, Project Mayhem, opened in London and Hong Kong in 2017, described by the Londonist as "an enjoyable, high-energy hit of dystopian underworld" and the South China Morning Post stated "Secret Theatre will deal a brutal body blow to any preconceptions you may have about a night out at the theatre with its latest Hong Kong production, Project Mayhem a show that will leave you sweating for more."

Crawford took the Scissorshands helm in New York, saying "There's a mystique around this project" Describing the project in an interview with the New York Times he said "It's not Broadway, It's everyone pitching in and doing their bit for the love of the art, really." The production had mixed reviews, Show Business Weekly stated that "despite Crawford's valiant attempt at engaging the audience, however, Edward Scissorhands is simply a story better told on film than on stage." Free Willamsburg, on the other hand, lauded the production stating "What's cool then is you aren't just watching another re-enactment of a storyline hashed out over years of rebuttals, but a first-time staging, done by friends, not for money or fame, but led by their passion for the stage, and perhaps spooked themselves by the tragic story of the underdeveloped stranger with scissors for his hands."

After Edward Scissorhands, Crawford opened his third play in three years, Diary of a Sociopathic Freakazoid, where "Writer/director/actor Richard Crawford and his international band of performers who comprise the Brooklyn Studio Lab are performing Diary of a Sociopathic Freakazoid in Hollywood after a successful premiere at New York's View Theatre." In an interview with Amy Tofte at the LA Bitter Lemon Magazine, Crawford explained the move to Hollywood, ""I like the theatre scene in LA because it's underground and you're doing something that isn't necessarily commercially appealing to everyone," Crawford says. "The people who do it here really want to fucking do it. It reminds me of Edinburgh."

The show described as "a relentless exploration of the mind of a twenty something sociopath and his family and friends in Manhattan, a theatrical experience that will explore and express the mind of a sociopath using theatrical, musical and installation elements," was well received in LA and was nominated for best International play. Notoriously tough LA Weekly critic Bill Raden singled the show out as one of the highlights of the Hollywood theatre offerings stating, "By the end of this unrelentingly Dostoyevskian descent into vice, self-abasement, caddishness and appalling personal betrayal, Dominic (Crawford) successfully sweeps such emotional encumbrances from his life with a fierce and frightening finality. A hilariously scathing serenade to the all-consuming self-absorption of the artistic ego."

In 2013 Crawford returned to London and collaborated with fellow New York Strasberg alumnus Brooke Johnston and co-directed Shakespeare's Hamlet with a Method influence at The Drayton Theatre in Kensington. London Theatre profiled the production "Set in the swinging sixties with Mad Men era costumes expect the sex, drugs, and rock and roll indicative of the period," This controversial take on Hamlet proved highly successful with Timeout giving it a 4/5 star average stating "I found this Hamlet to be fresh, lively and provocative." London Hot Hot Magazine also praised the productions risky modern take with critic Cameron Yorke stating "Whether or not you have a passion for Hamlet, this production will have you riveted throughout the entire performance with its connection to today's lifestyle and above all is a thoroughly enjoyable, witty Show.!"

In July 2013 Crawford became the artistic director of Secret Theatre London and adapted and directed the London stage premier of Quentin Tarantino's Reservoir Dogs. The production aimed to help charities including Shelter and Save The Wild Tigers, journalist Emma Stone stated in an interview with Crawford "The commitment and passion Richard speaks of his production with is a breath of fresh air amidst a climate dominated by profit and recession, with the ever increasing cuts to arts funding marring the potential of original British theatre."

The production of Reservoir Dogs split critics, with Dominic Maxwell at The Times stating "Sell the sizzle not the steak," and The Stage noting "Crawford's dialogue is punchy enough but his adaptations defuse the power of Tarantino's blistering script." whilst Everything Theatre stated the production was "Edgy and exciting. Tarantino is a big name to live up to, and this production does him justice." The production quickly sold out and gained a cult following and a five star average user rating with Time Out.

2014 saw Crawford open his play Freakazoid in May at The Proud Archivist in London as part of Secret Theatre. The production, which was site-specific in an East End art gallery where you watched the artist have a personal breakdown as performance art, sold out and gained a 5-star review in Punk Art London, who stated "It was refreshing and remarkable for a production company that has previously performed Reservoir Dogs and Edward Scissorhand’s would choose to take a risk with new material. The topics hit raw nerves. Highly relatable and disturbingly spot on, the ending cuts deep." The raw nerves caused some audience members to walk out, with Miista Magazine stating "we can see he why Crawford’s work is compared to the likes of Bret Easton Ellis. In this case it drew more parallels with Less Than Zero but his style is as eerie and entertaining as the American writer’s. The show was not to everyones taste with critic Anna Forsyth describing the show as "Unsubtle. This might sound odd, but the most subtle acting and story (and my favourite parts of the show) came from trans prostitute Nadia, a six foot something wonder in heels."

After a site-specific production of Hamlet at Garricks Temple in London in July 2014, co-directed by Richard Crawford and Brooke Johnston, the production, originally performed at The Drayton Theatre in London in 2013, transferred to Edinburgh for the Fringe Festival in August 2014. The production gained 4 stars from Edinburgh Spotlight who expressed "Secret Theatre’s Hamlet boasts a very natural performance and it earns its stars for a fresh take on the play, and the energy and interactive connection of its direction and most of its performers." Three Weeks also praised the production and the performances giving it 4 stars and stating "All of the cast do an excellent job, with the actor playing Hamlet delivering a mesmerising performance. " Audience Fringe reviews were also very positive with Cristina Olsson writing "One of the best Hamlet I have seen! Brilliant!"

In 2016 Crawford adapted, produced and directed Hell Hath No Fury at Dusk Till Dawn a Tarantino-inspired immersive, site-specific vampire thriller that opened in London and then transferred to Hong Kong that year. The show opened with a lot of buzz, selling out quickly in both cities, with Timeout giving it a 5-star review and stating, "The wildly successful Secret Theatre project returns to Hong Kong! Touted as one of the city’s best (or worst) kept undercover cultural events last year, 2015’s production saw a production of Seven out on Lamma Island. As the location and theme of this year’s production is secret until the purchase of your ticket, you’ve got to pay out to find out!" The production again pushed the boundaries of immersive theatre, with cult commentary Typewriter stating "They totally turn the table over with this year’s production, which is a transfer of their original production done in London a few months ago. An immersive piece really successfully done with a gripping structure and acquired aesthetic taste. I finally can see the brilliant skills of Mr Crawford’s directions. Everything is designed closely to the venue, from the play structure to the design of the costumes and the use of lighting."

In 2016 Crawford also wrote, produced and directed Code 2021, an immersive futuristic court room drama at The Town Hall Hotel in London. London's evening standard previewed the production in Top 5 Autumn London shows, as did Buzzfeed including the production in its "cultured as fuck" section. West End Wilma highlighted the importance of the production stating "This was the absolute epitome of ‘immersive’ theatre, relying heavily on the input of an audience, without whom the production would be impossible to operate. As the drama played out, it was fascinating to observe how the twists and turns of the plot inspired mounting participation and passion from members of the audience, forcing us to confront our own moral and ethical viewpoints. It revealed the complexities of the justice system, and the challenges involved with sentencing a defendant. It was deeply satisfying to walk away from a piece of theatre feeling challenged, both intellectually and emotionally."
