= Derrick Crawford =

Derrick Crawford may refer to:

- Derrick Crawford (defensive lineman) (born 1979), American football defensive lineman
- Derrick Crawford (wide receiver) (born 1960), American football wide receiver
