= Francis Crawford =

Francis Crawford may refer to:

- Francis Chalmers Crawford (1851–1908), Scottish stockbroker and amateur ornithologist
- Francis Edward Crawford (1870-1947), Canadian politician and municipal public servant
- Francis Marion Crawford (1854–1909), American novelist
- Francis Crawford of Lymond, fictional central figure of The Lymond Chronicles book series by Dorothy Dunnett
