= Amy Crawford =

Amy Crawford may refer to:

- Amy Crawford (musician), from Brooklyn, NY
- Amy Crawford (Nitro Girl), dancer who performed as A.C. Jazz in World Championship Wrestling
