= Jessie Crawford =

Jessie Crawford (4 June 1828–2 December 1875) was a New Zealand barrack matron.

== Biography ==
She was born in Glasgow, Lanarkshire, Scotland. She was responsible for the women's immigrant barracks in Dunedin 1862–1875, during a period of intense government sponsored female immigration to New Zealand. Her task was to be responsible for the immigrant women until they could leave the barracks for marriage or employment, thereby functioning as an employment agent. She was unique in her position, as all other women in her office was employed only as a complement to their husband's, while she had her own office as such.

She died on 2 December 1872.
