= Justin Crawford =

Justin Crawford may refer to:

- Justin Crawford (American football) (born 1995), American football running back
- Justin Crawford (Australian footballer) (1977–2022), Australian rules footballer
- Justin Crawford (baseball), American baseball player
