= Grey Crawford =

American conceptual artist

Grey Crawford (born August 9, 1951) is a conceptual artist. He was born, lives and works in Los Angeles, California.

== Early life and education ==
Born in Inglewood, Los Angeles County, Crawford grew up in a small community in Claremont in the neighborhood of hard-edge painter Karl Benjamin as well as the painter John McLaughlin who lived not far away in the Dana Point beach area.

Crawford started his classical training in photography at the Rochester Institute of Technology in New York in 1972, where he had close contact with Betty Hahn, Nathan Lyons, Michael Bishop, and Les Krims, among others.

He returned to California as a graduate student in 1975 to continue his studies at the Claremont Graduate School. Lewis Baltz had just departed the faculty but the influence of his neutral photographic documentation practice was still very noticeable. Besides, artists from a variety of disciplines were active during these years in Claremont as teachers and visiting lectures, like Michael Asher, Mowry Baden, Michael Brewster, Judy Fiskin, Robert Irwin, James Turrell, Leland Rice, Paul Soldner, Harrison McIntosh, John Mason, and Ed Moses.

== Work ==
Since the 1970s Grey Crawford produced an extensive body of work, embodying aspects from different disciplines and media in his photographic series.

His oeuvre has rarely been exhibited in the last forty years and is just beginning to be the subject of art historical research. It was not until 2017 that his Umbra series (1975-78), in which he worked a masking technique in the darkroom to incorporate basic geometric shapes in his Southern California landscapes, was first rediscovered and presented to the public, making it a subject of critical attention. This was followed by the display of the series El Mirage (1976-79) and Chroma (1978-84). Since then his works have been published in several books and have been incorporated in the collections of the Getty Museum and the Albright-Knox Art Gallery.

== Publications ==
- Finding Bones, Published by Kehrer Verlag, Heidelberg 2017, Introduction by Timothy Persons, Essay by Lyle Rexer.
- El Mirage, Published by Hatje Cantz, Berlin 2018, Introduction by Timothy Persons, Essay by Lyle Rexer.
