= Ronald Crawford (soccer) =

South African footballer

Personal information
- Full name: Ronald Crawford
- Date of birth: c. 1910
- Place of birth: South Africa
- Position: Right back

Senior career*
Years	Team	Apps	(Gls)
	St Johnstone	0	(0)
1930	Thames	3	(0)
1931	Rotherham United	3	(0)
	Vale of Atholl	0	(0)
- * Club domestic league appearances and goals

Ronald Crawford (born c. 1910; date of death unknown) is a South African former football player who played as a right back for Thames and Rotherham United in the Football League. He also played for St Johnstone and Vale of Atholl in Scotland.
