= Katherine B. Crawford =

American historian

- Born: 1966 (age 59–60)

Academic background
- Education: BA, 1988, Columbia University; PhD, 1997, University of Chicago
- Thesis: Regency government in early modern France: gender substitution and the construction of monarchical authority (1997)

Katherine "Katie" B. Crawford (born 1966) is an American historian. She is the Cornelius Vanderbilt Professor of Women's and Gender Studies and History at Vanderbilt University.

== Early life and education ==
Crawford was born in 1966. She earned her BA from Columbia University, PhD at the University of Chicago before accepting a Harper Postdoctoral Fellowship for two years.

== Career ==
Upon ending her fellowship, Crawford accepted a position in Vanderbilt University's history department. She wrote her first book in 2004 called Perilous Performances: Gender and Regency in Early Modern France, which focused on how the French monarchy adapted to women rulers when the appointed King was unfit to serve. She discussed how the political environment shifted as women moved from a place of passiveness to ruling a patriarchal society. Her second book was published a few years later in 2007 as part of the New Approaches to European History series, and was titled European Sexualities, 1400-1800. The book was aimed at undergraduates and focused on many aspects of gender and sexuality such as; marriage and family, religion and sexuality, science and medicine, crime and social control, and deviancy and the culture of sex. Following the publication of her second book, Crawford was awarded the 2008 Jeffrey Nordhaus Award for Excellence in Undergraduate Teaching.

In 2010, Crawford published her third book The Sexual Culture of the French Renaissance, through the Cambridge University Press. The book focused on sexuality during the French Revolution. Seven years later, she was promoted to the Cornelius Vanderbilt Professor of Women's and Gender Studies and History at Vanderbilt.
