= Leigh Crawford =

Australian rules footballer (1946–2026)

Personal information
- Born: 19 April 1946
- Died: 27 April 2026 (aged 80)
- Original team: Sunshine (VFA)
- Height: 199 cm (6 ft 6 in)
- Weight: 89 kg (196 lb)
- Position: Ruck

Playing career
Years	Club	Games (Goals)
1974 — 1975	Geelong	31 (6)

Leigh Crawford (19 April 1946 – 27 April 2026) was an Australian rules footballer who played for Geelong in the Victorian Football League (now known as the Australian Football League). He died on 27 April 2026, at the age of 80.
