= Mary Crawford =

Mary Crawford may refer to:

- Mary Ann Crawford (1901–1988), American architect
- Mary Caroline Crawford (1874–1932), American author, social worker, and suffragist
- Mary Crawford Fraser (1851–1922), née Mary Crawford, Italian-born American writer
- Mary Crawford (politician) (born 1947), Australian politician
- Mary M. Crawford (1884–1972), American surgeon
- Lady Mary Lindsay Crawford, see Crawford Priory
- Pseudonym of David DeCoteau (born 1962), American film director and producer

== Fictional characters ==
- Mary Crawford (Mansfield Park), in Jane Austen's 1814 novel, Mansfield Park
- Mary Crawford, in the US science-fiction TV series Taken
- Mary Crawford, in the 1978 comedy film The One and Only

== See also ==
- Nora Mary Crawford (1917–1997), New Zealand policewoman
