= Louisa Crawford =

- Born: 27 September 1789; Lackham House, Wiltshire
- Died: 29 December 1857 (aged 68)
- Occupation: Songwriter
- Notable work: "Kathleen Mavourneen"
- Spouse: Matthew Crawford
- Parents: George Montagu; Ann Courtenay

Louisa Matilda Jane Crawford (née Montagu; 27 September 1789 - 29 December 1857) was an English songwriter. She wrote the lyrics to the popular song "Kathleen Mavourneen" which was set to music by English composer Frederick Crouch.

== Life and work ==
Crawford was born to Ann Courtenay (d. 1816) and George Montagu (1753–1815) of Lackham House, in Wiltshire. Montagu was an army officer and naturalist, known for his pioneering Ornithological Dictionary of 1802 and for species such as Montagu's harrier, named for him. Crawford was related to nobility on both sides of her family; her mother was the niece of John Stuart, 3rd Earl of Bute, and her father was the son of Henry Montagu, 1st Earl of Manchester. She had five siblings; George Conway Courtenay (b. 24 June 1776), James, Frederic (d. 16 May 1811), Eleonora, and John. Three of her brothers died in conflicts abroad; James became a prisoner of war in France, John was killed whilst serving in the Royal Navy, and Frederic fell at the Battle of Albuera.

In 1798, Montagu left his family and moved to Kingsbridge in Devon to live with his mistress Elizabeth Dorville, wife of John Dorville and daughter of Georg Wolff, with whom he had four more children. Upon the death of Crawford's uncle, James Montagu, the family estates, including Lackham House, were left to her brother George rather than her father. The ensuing lawsuit between the pair resulted in huge debts which cost the family the estate. Crawford wrote of the affair in The Metropolitan Magazine in 1835, 'The thoughtless extravagance of youth, and the unwise conduct of mature age, caused the estates to be thrown into chancery.'

In 1822, Crawford married Matthew Crawford of Middle Temple, a barrister. After her marriage she first began to earn an income through song-writing and poetry. She was quite prolific and a collection of her papers in the archives at the University of Edinburgh contains a few hundred handwritten poems and songs, although she received little recognition in her lifetime. Much of her work appeared, often anonymously, in magazines and journals, was sold to music publishers, and was set to music by composers Samuel Wesley, Sydney Nelson, and others.

== "Kathleen Mavourneen" ==
The song "Kathleen Mavourneen" appeared in 1837 and became popular during the American Civil War. The Irish soprano Catherine Hayes (1818–1861) learned the song while training in Dublin. It became her signature tune during concerts, and she sang it for Queen Victoria and over 500 royal guests during a performance at Buckingham Palace in June 1849. The song gained popularity with American audiences as a direct result of Hayes' international concert tours between 1851 and 1856. The song also plays a prominent role in Michael Shaara's American Civil War historical novel The Killer Angels and its film adaptation Gettysburg.

Crawford, however, gained little recognition for the song's success. Her name has been incorrectly cited as Annie, Julia, and Marion in connection with the song, and Crouch was also frequently erroneously credited as the author of the lyrics. Amongst Crawford's papers is a poem titled, 'On hearing Miss Catherine Hays [sic], sing Kathleen Mavourneen!' which reads:

"Oh! Sing again sweet maiden sing

That lovely strain which first I heard

When this lone heart was in its spring

And throbb'd to every tender word

Yes! Mem'ry brings those hours again

When seated by her side alone

I bow'd me to the melting strain

And Dermot's woes seemed all mine own.'

== Death ==
Crawford died in 1857, of unknown causes, although Matthew refers to a long affliction of heart disease supplemented by attacks of bronchitis in an 1846 letter.
