= Paul Crawford =

Paul Crawford may refer to:

- Paul Crawford (academic) (born 1963), English academic and writer
- Paul Crawford (composer) (born 1947), Canadian composer, radio producer, organist, and music educator
- Paul Crawford (jazz musician) (1925–1996), American jazz musician, music arranger, and music historian
