= Emily Crawford =

Irish journalist (1841–1915)

- Born: Emily Johnstone; 31 May 1841; Dublin, Ireland
- Died: 30 December 1915 (aged 74); Bristol, England

Emily Crawford (31 May 1841 – 30 December 1915) was an Irish journalist.

== Life ==
Emily Crawford was born Emily Johnstone, probably in Dublin, on 31 May 1841. Although some sources state her year of birth as 1831 and place of birth as Edgeworthstown, as her father was from Longford. She was the daughter of the landowner, Andrew Johnstone, and his American wife, Grace (née Martin). Crawford was educated at home in her youth. She and her mother moved to Paris in 1857 following the death of her father and ensuing financial difficulties. While there she attended the Sorbonne. When a letter she had written to a friend was seen by a magazine editor, she was recruited to write for the London Morning Star regularly. Through this work and contributions to other papers, her novel approach to journalism and unconventional style became very popular with the readers. By 1864, her future sister-in-law noted that she was "a literary lady and wonderfully clever making £400 a year with her pen!!"

In 1864, she married George Moreland Crawford who was the Paris correspondent of The Daily News. The couple went on to have three sons and a daughter. The couple collaborated on dispatches, most significantly during the 1870–1871 Franco-Prussian War. They took the risky journey to Tours having placed their children in safety. In Tours they stayed with the troops for a number of months. Crawford interviewed the leaders of the Paris Commune in 1871, and that May was the only journalist to gain access to the Versailles debate which saw the French government defeated. As she had nothing to write with, she memorised the events and met her husband at midnight. They worked through the night so that The Daily News was the first to report on it. Amongst her friends was the French statesman, Adolphe Thiers, who allowed her to use his private telegraph for her dispatches. She wrote about his career after his death in 1877. Crawford wrote for a number of English and American publications on a wide range of subjects, including Truth and New-York Tribune.

Her husband died in 1885 following a wasp-sting to an artery, which saw Crawford taking over as The Daily News Paris correspondent, holding the position until 1907. She wrote a book on Queen Victoria, Victoria, queen and writer was published in 1903. She was a member of the Cobden Club. She was nominated for the Légion d'honneur but wanted her son Robert to receive it instead. Crawford died in Bristol on 30 December 1915, having been evacuated from Paris by her son that year.
