= Patrick Crawford (soldier) =

Scottish soldier

- Died: 1614; Isla, Scotland
- Occupations: Soldier, settler

Patrick Crawford (died 1614) was a Scottish soldier who settled, and became a landowner, in Ireland.

In 1608 Crawford commanded a force of Scottish troops at Strabane and Lifford who following Sir Cahir O'Doherty's Burning of Derry, helped defeat what became known as O'Doherty's Rebellion. For his service, he was awarded 1,000 acres of land near Kilmacrennan in County Donegal, qualifying as a servitor. There was some resentment of land been given to Crawford and another Scot William Stewart ahead of English and Irish veterans of the Nine Years' War, but they received the backing of James I.

In 1614 Crawford led a force to suppress a rebellion on the isle of Isla off the Scottish Coast, and was killed during fighting there.

== Bibliography ==
- Bardon, Jonathan. The Plantation of Ulster. Gill & MacMillan, 2012.
- Bradley, Jim & Dooher, John. The fair river valley: Strabane through the ages. Ulster Historical Foundation, 2000.
