= Edmund Thornton Crawford =

Scottish painter

- Born: 7 June 1806; Dalkeith, Scotland
- Died: 27 September 1885 (aged 79); Lasswade, Scotland

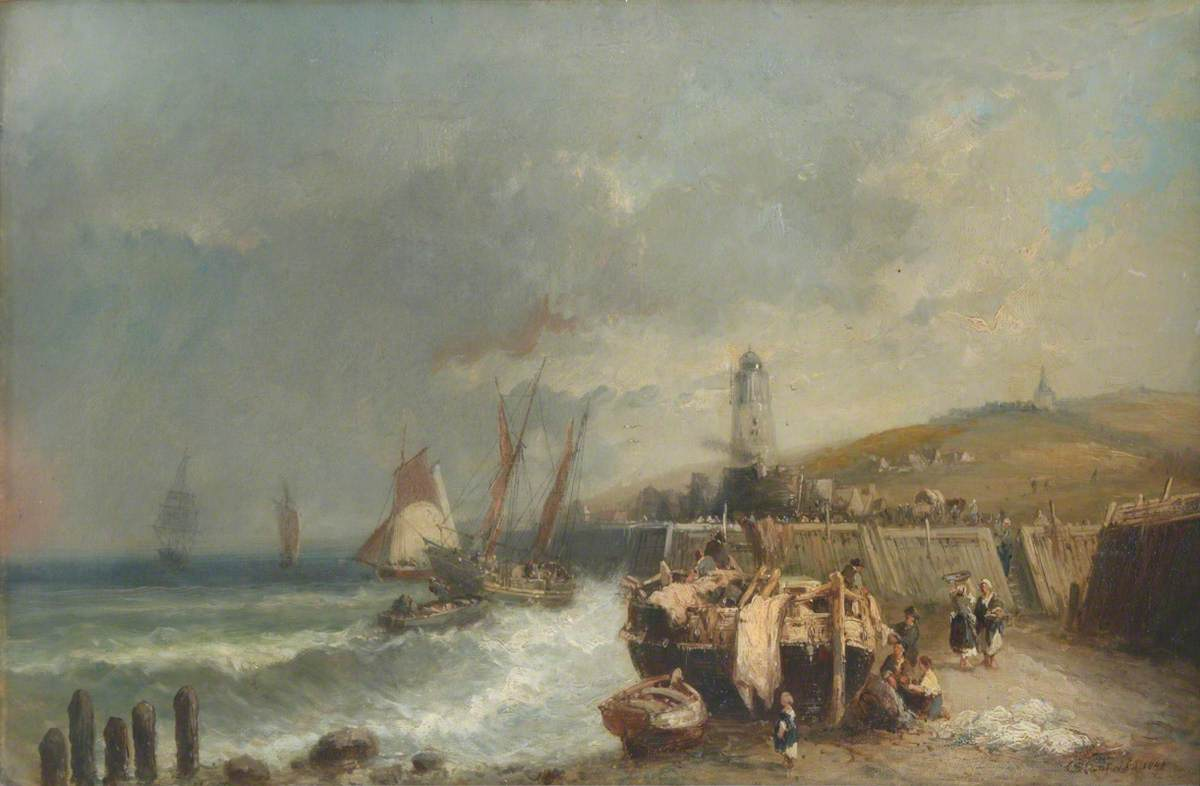
Edmund Thornton Crawford, Seascape

Edmund Thornton Crawford RSA (7 June 1806 – 27 September 1885) was a Scottish landscape and marine painter.

== Early life and education ==
Crawford was born at Cowden, near Dalkeith, in 1806. He was the son of a land surveyor, and when a boy was apprenticed to a house-painter in Edinburgh, but having evinced a decided taste and ability for art, his engagement was cancelled, and he entered the Trustees' Academy under Andrew Wilson, where he had for fellow-students David Octavius Hill, Robert Scott Lauder, and others. William Simson, who was one of the older students, became his most intimate friend and acknowledged master, and from their frequent sketching expeditions together Crawford imbibed many of the best qualities of that able artist.

== Career ==
His early efforts in art were exhibited in the Royal Institution, and his first contributions to the annual exhibition of the Royal Scottish Academy appeared in 1831, two of these being taken from lowland scenery in Scotland, and the third being the portrait of a lady. Although not one of the founders of the academy, Crawford was one of its earliest elected members. His name appears in the original list of associates, but having withdrawn from the body before its first exhibition, it was not until 1839 that he became an associate. Meanwhile, he visited the Netherlands, whither he went several times afterwards, and studied very closely the Dutch masters, whose influence in forming his picturesque style was seen in nearly all that he painted.

The ample materials which he gathered in that country and in his native land afforded subjects for a long series of landscapes and coast scenes, chiefly, however, Scottish; but it was not till 1848, in which year he was elected an academician, that he produced his first great picture, 'Eyemouth Harbour,’ and this he rapidly followed up with other works of high quality which established his reputation as one of the greatest masters of landscape-painting in Scotland. Among these were a 'View on the Meuse,’ 'A Fresh Breeze,’ 'River Scene and Shipping, Holland,’ 'Dutch Market Boats,’ 'French Fishing Luggers,’ 'Whitby, Yorkshire,’ and 'Hartlepool Harbour.' He also painted in water-colours, usually working on light brown crayon paper, and using body-colour freely. He practised also at one time very successfully as a teacher of art. The only picture which he contributed to a London exhibition was a 'View of the Port and Fortifications of Callao, and Capture of the Spanish frigate Esmeralda,’ at the Royal Academy in 1836. The characteristics of his art are those of what may be termed the old school of Scottish landscape-painting. This was not so realistic in detail as the modern school, but was perhaps wider in its grasp, and strove to give impressions of nature rather than the literal truth. In 1858 Crawford left Edinburgh and settled at Lasswade, but he continued to contribute regularly to the annual exhibitions of the academy till 1877, maintaining to the last the high position he had gained early in life. He was at one time a keen sportsman with both rod and gun.

== Death ==
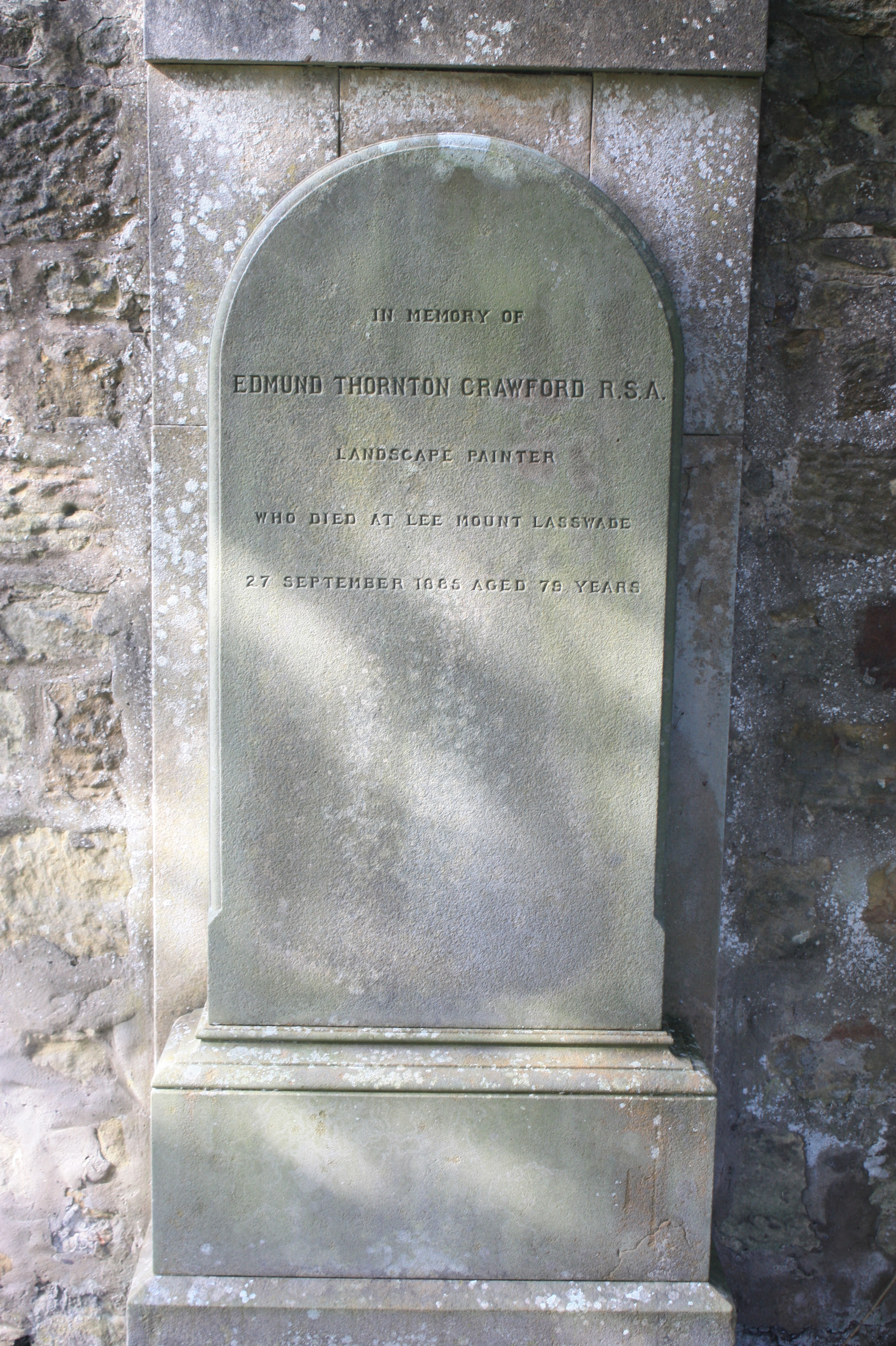
The grave of Edmund Thornton Crawford, Dalkeith Cemetery

He died at Lasswade on 27 September 1885, after having for many years suffered much and lived in the closest retirement. He was buried in the new cemetery at Dalkeith. A 'Coast Scene, North Berwick,’ and 'Close Hauled; crossing the Bar,’ by him, are in the National Gallery of Scotland.

He is buried in Dalkeith Cemetery against the west wall.
