= Rick Crawford (cycling) =

American cycling coach

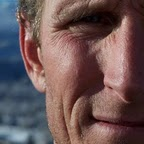
Rick Crawford

Rick Crawford is an American endurance sports coach based in Durango, Colorado. He has coached endurance athletes including Lance Armstrong, Levi Leipheimer and Willow Koerber, and managed elite/pro level cycling programs, including coaching the Fort Lewis College cycling team.

== Career ==
Crawford started his coaching career guiding a young Lance Armstrong through his first paces as a professional triathlete. Chann McRae was the next prodigy to be influenced by Coach Crawford's counsel. After retiring from his own professional athletic career in 1992, Crawford started coaching full-time, boosting the careers of Todd Wells, Levi Leipheimer, Chris Wherry into the limelight. Shonny Vanlandingham and Jamie Whitmore earned XTERRA world championships under Crawford's tutelage. Willow Koerber credits Crawford for rescuing her career and taking her to the top of the world MTB rankings. Tom Danielson continues to improve under Crawford's watchful care. Olympic Biathlon twins Lanny and Tracy Barnes are now working directly with Crawford.

Rick was head coach for the Mercury–Viatel program during its heyday as a top-ranked Division 1 professional cycling program in 2001. He built a collegiate cycling dynasty at Fort Lewis College, leading them to ten national championships and the number one ranking over an eight-year stint. Crawford co-founded the TargeTraining Professional Cycling Team, co-directing and managing the team. He was also involved with professional cycling outfit Team Type 1 in its formative years, and was instrumental in constructing the team's mission statement and management structure, handled all coaching and assisted in directing duties. Crawford was the coach/DS for the Bahati Foundation Pro Cycling Team and was progenitor of the RealCyclist Pro Cycling Team.

Crawford is now a staff member with the Chipotle Development Pro Cycling Team, Garmin–Cervélo's feeder squad. In December 2012, he was fired from his position as a coach at the Colorado Mesa University when he became apparent that he was involved in doping numerous cyclists, including Levi Leipheimer.

== Other work ==
Crawford is involved in research at his physiology lab, the Durango Performance Center, in Durango, Colorado in conjunction with cardiologist/exercise physiologist Dr. Bruce Andrea. Crawford is also working on the Dryside Velodrome Project in Durango that hopes to bring a velodrome to the town.

== Clients ==
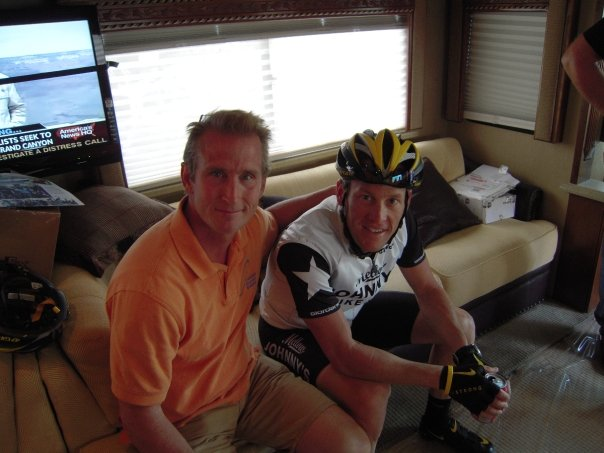
Rick and Lance Armstrong

- Lanny Barnes – Olympic Biathlon
- Tracy Barnes – Olympic Biathlon
- Tom Danielson – Road Cycling (Garmin–Cervélo)
- Willow Koerber – Mountain Bike Racing (Trek World Racing)
- Shonny Vanlandingham – XTERRA Triathlon (Luna Chix)
- Todd Wells – Mountain Bike Racing, Cyclocross (Specialized Factory Team)
