= Anthony Crawford =

Anthony Crawford may refer to:

- Anthony Crawford (bassist) (born 1981), American musician, producer and songwriter
- Anthony Crawford (musician, born 1957), American multi-instrumentalist, singer and songwriter
- Anthony Crawford (lynching victim), African American man who was killed by a lynch mob in South Carolina in 1916
- Shep Crawford (Anthony Schappel Crawford, born 1970), American R&B and gospel musician, songwriter, and record producer
