= Crawford Symonds =

Australian cricketer

Personal information
- Born: 15 February 1915; Adelaide, Australia
- Died: 20 July 2000 (aged 85)
- Source: Cricinfo, 28 September 2020

Crawford Symonds (15 February 1915 – 20 July 2000) was an Australian cricketer. He played in four first-class matches for South Australia in 1945/46.

== See also ==
- List of South Australian representative cricketers
