= Susan Crawford =

Susan Crawford may refer to:

- Susan Fletcher Crawford (1863–1918), Scottish etcher
- Susan J. Crawford, American judge and senior Pentagon official, the convening authority for Guantanamo military commissions 2007–2010
- Susan M. Crawford (born 1965), American judge and member of the Wisconsin Supreme Court
- Susan P. Crawford (born 1963), American professor of law at Harvard Law School

== See also ==
- Sue Crawford (born 1967), American politician from Nebraska
