= The Udal =

Archaeological site on North Uist, Scotland

Coordinates: 57°40′57″N 7°19′41″W

Wheelhouse and further building, seen in 2015

The Udal is an archaeological site on North Uist, Outer Hebrides, Scotland. Historic Environment Scotland lists the site as Coileagan An Udal and gives Rubha an Udail as an alternative name. It is on the western side of the now-uninhabited Ard a' Mhorrain peninsula on the north coast of North Uist, north of the township of Sollas. Excavation, principally the work led by Iain Crawford between 1963 and 1994, has shown evidence of 5,000 years of use of the site, with remains preserved under drifted sand but vulnerable to marine erosion.

== History ==
A 1469 charter from James II of Scotland, granting North Uist to the Clan MacDonald of Sleat, mentions the Udal, in a Gaelic spelling, as one of two settlements on the Aird a'Bhorrain peninsula, the other being Veilish, each assessed at one half-penny. The township of Udal was the home of the local tacksman, who collected the rents from a group of neighbouring townships. Remains of five houses from this period have been identified. Udal appears to have been deserted by 1685, around the time of a series of sand-blows which devastated much arable land in the Western Isles.

== Chronology ==
A paper presented to the Comhairle nan Eilean Siar, the Council of the Western Isles, in 2010 provides a concise summary of the main "events, remains and objects at Udal", from which the following is extracted.

The earliest evidence found of human activity is Neolithic, with a line of stones and an upright stone which some consider to resemble a great auk, and a shaft containing quartz pebbles and capped by a whale vertebra. Later Neolithic stages show houses similar to those at Skara Brae, including one with evidence of clay being worked on the site.

Bronze Age or Beaker period remains include "about 70 pits with no obvious function", having been refilled soon after they were cut, along with "giant" post holes and a standing stone. Later Bronze Age finds included a well-preserved human skeleton, and a joint burial of a human and a deer.

From the Iron Age were found several wheelhouses and a souterrain, painted pebbles and painted pottery, stone cremation platforms with remains of human and animal cremated bones, and a field system for arable crops.

A group of houses known as jelly baby houses (from their shape resembling the sweet) were dated to between AD 300 and AD 800.

The Vikings left evidence of building in turf, which decayed but left a characteristic mauve colour in the sand. Ceramics from this period included a type of flat dish, probably used for baking bread, named as Udal Platter Ware. There were finds of very high quality bone combs and dress ornaments.

A longhouse dated to around AD 1200 to AD 1250 "bridged the little known gap of knowledge between the Vikings and the Later Medieval period", and stood to the height of its gable.

The tacksman's township, with evidence of five houses, was recorded in documents until 1685 and then buried in 15 metres (49 ft) of blown sand. The settlement had moved to Grenitote.

From the 18th and 19th centuries there were kilns for drying kelp and remains of sheilings, and from the 19th to 20th century a saw pit for sawing timbers from wrecked ships.

== Archaeology ==
Traigh Udal in 2012

Drifting sand and machair have preserved evidence of occupation of the peninsula over millennia, but parts of the site are now vulnerable to erosion from the sea or have already been lost. A unusually high perihelion tide in 1974 scoured away sand deposits to reveal hitherto-unknown archaeological evidence. There is evidence of occupation of the site in the neolithic period, the Bronze Age, and the Iron Age; a Viking longhouse and later use through to an early 20th-century saw-pit. Because of this 5,000-year span the site has been described as "one of the most important archaeological sites not only in the Western Isles but also in the United Kingdom", revealing "a long history of change and adaption that is unique in the Western Isles - and perhaps anywhere else in the world".

=== Early work ===
The Proceedings of the Society of Antiquaries of Scotland for 1912 record that "donations to the museum and library" included gifts from Arthur Campbell-Orde of "Fragments of Pottery from the sandhills at Udal, North Uist" (described in detail), "Four Hammer-Stones from Udal", and "Four Bone Implements, ... one a bone needle 1⅞ inches in length, from Udal"; and from Erskine Beveridge of "Miscellaneous objects from the sandhill sites at Udal" including items of stone, bronze, steatite, antler-horn and ceramic. John Graham Callander (Note: John Graham Callander (1873-March 1938) was a Scottish archaeologist and director of the National Museum of Antiquities of Scotland. A pen sketch portrait of him by James Smith Richardson is held by the Wellcome collection and his obituary appeared in The Orkney Herald on 23 March 1938.) visited in 1914 for the RCAHMS, published in 1928 under the title "Earth-houses (ruined), Udal".

=== Crawford's work ===
Iain Crawford began fieldwork on The Udal in 1963, with his wife Harriet Crawford. His excavation concentrated on three sites within the peninsula, known as Udal north, Udal south, and RUX6 (one of six numberered sites at Rubha an Udail X). Crawford, with some 500 student volunteers over the years, excavated every summer season from 1963 to 1994. The work received support from Historic Scotland and the Russell Trust. His work has been described as "one of the largest rural excavations ever dug in Scotland" and "one of the longest archaeological projects undertaken in the British Isles".

== Post-excavation developments ==
Crawford published six documents on the work, in 1994-1996. In 2002 he agreed to allow the digitisation of some of his material by GUARD at Glasgow University, but within a few years he could no longer collaborate due to ill health and he moved to a care home in 2008.

Crawford's archive and collection of material from the excavation is now in the ownership of Comhairle nan Eilean Siar, the Council of the Northern Isles. A 2015 update by Mark Hall noted that "The latest phase of post-excavation research on the smallest site (RUX6) of the Udal, North Uist has just recommenced" and that "Teasing the story from hand-written, pre-computerised notes is not easy, but enough of the evidence remains to interpret the story and the accompanying finds and samples." The book Life on the Edge: The Neolithic and Bronze Age of Iain Crawford’s Udal, North Uist, edited by Beverley Ballin Smith, was published in 2018 by Archaeopress (ISBN 978-1-78491-770-8 and online). As of 2026 the material is stored on the Scottish mainland, pending further research.

A digital walking tour of the peninsula has been created in a collaboration between the council, the North Uist Development Company, and Comann Eachdraidh Uibhist a Tuath (CEUT, North Uist Historical Society).

== Iain Crawford ==
Iain A. Crawford (spelled Ian in some sources) was born in Glasgow in 1928. He attended Glasgow Academy and, after military service from 1947 to 1949, gained a BA and a postgraduate diploma at Christ's College, Cambridge. From 1960 to 1969 he was a research fellow at Edinburgh University's School of Scottish Studies, and from 1969 to 1974 was Director of Studies at Cambridge. From 1963 to 1994 he conducted excavations at The Udal. He published "Contributions to a history of domestic settlement in North Uist" in Scottish Studies in 1965.

His last publication was a chapter on wheelhouses for In the Shadow of Brochs, a 2002 festschrift for Euan MacKie. The editor recalls "His paper is an extraordinary contribution, and as we later found out some of the information was inaccurate, but nevertheless we kept it. It had been a long time since he had written anything ... His writing style, including his choice of words, was somewhat unusual and like him, was unique and eccentric. With hindsight, I was glad that we published his paper."

Crawford was married first to Harriet and then to Imogen, who survived him. He moved to a care home in 2008 after a long illness and died in 2016.
