= Andrew Crawford =

Andrew Crawford may refer to:

- Andrew Crawford (actor) (1917–1994), British actor
- Andrew Crawford (neuroscientist) (born 1949), British neuroscientist
- Andrew Crawford (entrepreneur) (born 1971), Irish entrepreneur
- Andrew Crawford (dancer), Australian dancer
- Andrew Crawford (knight), 13th–14th century Scottish knight
- Andy Crawford (footballer, born 1967) (born 1967), footballer and coach, mostly in the US
- Andy Crawford (footballer, born 1959) English footballer
