= Hubert H. Crawford =

- Born: Hubert Horace Crawford; September 22, 1910; Tuscaloosa, Alabama, U.S.
- Died: January 11, 1985 (aged 74); Utica, New York, U.S.
- Education: Albright Art School
- Occupation: Painter
- Spouse: Vera Jane Patterson

Hubert Horace Crawford (September 22, 1910 – January 11, 1985) was an American painter originally from Tuscaloosa, Alabama. He had many artistic talents. He played the violin. He also was a woodworker and designed furniture. He also designed and built his own powerboat, and it is believed that he was the first African American yachtsman in Buffalo. He was also a member of Michigan Avenue Baptist Church and Michigan Avenue YMCA.

== Early life ==
Crawford was born September 22, 1910, in Tuscaloosa, Alabama. In 1917, he moved with his family to Buffalo, New York. He spent his days in Buffalo and he graduated from the Albright Art School. He grew up during the time of the Harlem Renaissance, which had made an impact of his career later on in life. In high school, Crawford took a Saturday morning painting class at the Albright Art Gallery. He received a one-year scholarship to the Albright Art School, and he graduated in 1932. Eventually, he married a woman named Vera Jane Patterson.

== Career ==
Crawford was a painter and made many murals throughout his lifetime. Due to the fact that he lived through the Harlem Renaissance, he was chosen to do a mural for a popular jazz nightclub in Buffalo, called the Moonglow. It was a nightclub aimed towards African Americans. He painted a mural on the inside and outside of The Moonglow.

In 1939, the US Army hired Crawford to paint a mural in remembrance of World War I in the Officers Club Building of Fort Niagara State Park. The mural was 28 feet long but 20 feet high. The mural pays tribute to the Battle of Cantigny, the first battle that was led and fought by only Americans. In 1940, Hubert was hired to create a mural for the American Negro Exposition in Chicago. The mural was to honor the 75th anniversary of the Emancipation Proclamation.

Crawford worked with many different types of arts. He also created graphic arts and cartooning. He became a professor at the University of Buffalo.

== Death ==
In 1940, Crawford's life took a turn for the worse. He was in the attic of his home when he fell from the third-story window. He suffered much trauma from the fall, and it left him impaired for the remainder of his life. He resided at the Buffalo Psychiatric Center. He continued to create works while he was there, but his other works were not remembered the way they used to be. In 1977, he was moved to a senior center in Hamburg, New York. On January 11, 1985, Crawford died in a nursing home in Utica, New York.

== Artist legacy ==
After Crawford's death, his work seemed to have been forgotten. In an article in The Buffalo News, Robert Emerson, executive director of Old Fort Niagara said "He was well known in the 1930s but is forgotten today." His mural in the Officer's Club was restored by SUNY Buffalo State’s Art Conservation Department. Emerson hopes to make Crawford's name well known again, and he had plans to display his mural of the Battle of Contigny in a side room at Fort Niagara with other artifacts to remember the World Wars.
