= Pat Crawford (disambiguation) =

Pat Crawford may refer to:

- Pat Crawford (1933–2009), Australian cricketer
- Pat Crawford (baseball) (1902–1994), American baseball player
- Pat Crawford Brown (1929–2019), American actress
