= Lady Margaret Crawford =

Lady Margaret Crawford was the mother of the Scottish patriot William Wallace, and mentioned as a daughter of Hugh Crawford by Blind Harry. Born Dunfermline and final resting place grounds of Dunfermline Abbey marked by a plaque under a tree. Harry mentions Wallace's parentage in his poem The Wallace.
