= Ian Crawford (cricketer) =

English cricketer

Personal information
- Full name: Ian Cunningham Crawford
- Born: 13 September 1954 (age 72); Bristol, England
- Batting: Right-handed
- Bowling: Right-arm off break

Domestic team information
- Years: Team
- 1975–1978: Gloucestershire

Career statistics
Competition	First-class	List A
Matches	5	2
Runs scored	104	0
Batting average	14.85	0.00
100s/50s	0/1	0/0
Top score	73	0
Balls bowled	294	–
Wickets	3	–
Bowling average	58.00	–
5 wickets in innings	0	–
10 wickets in match	0	–
Best bowling	1/18	–
Catches/stumpings	5/–	1/–
- Source: Cricinfo, 30 July 2011

Ian Cunningham Crawford (born 13 September 1954) is a former English cricketer. Crawford was a right-handed batsman who bowled right-arm off break. He was born in Bristol.

Crawford made his first-class debut for Gloucestershire against Glamorgan in the 1975 County Championship. He made 4 further first-class appearances, the last of which came against the touring New Zealanders in 1978. In his 5 first-class matches, he scored 104 runs at an average of 14.85, with a high score of 73. This score came against Oxford University in 1978. With the ball, he took 3 wickets at a bowling average of 58.00, with best figures of 1/18. He made his List A debut in the 1978 John Player League against Derbyshire. He made a further List A appearance against the same opposition later that season in the Benson & Hedges Cup. He batted once in this format and was dismissed for a duck in this only innings.
