= Governor Crawford =

Governor Crawford may refer to:

- Coe I. Crawford (1858–1944), 6th Governor of South Dakota
- Frederick Crawford (colonial administrator) (1906–1978), Governor of Uganda from 1957 to 1961 and Governor of the Seychelles from 1951 to 1953
- George W. Crawford (1798–1872), 38th Governor of Georgia
- Samuel J. Crawford (1835–1913), 3rd Governor of Kansas
