= Roger Crawford (tennis) =

American tennis player

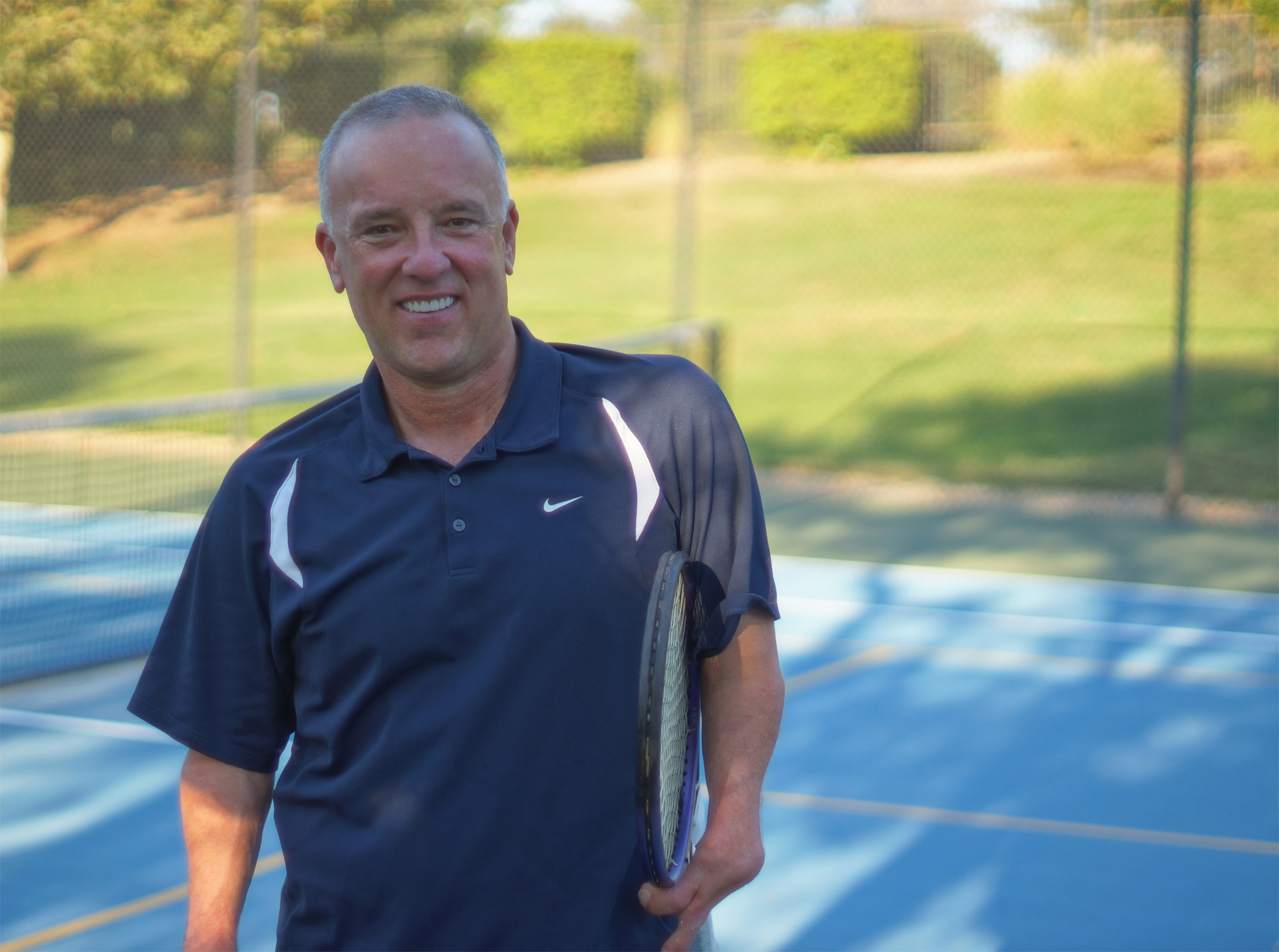
- Born: October 8, 1960 (age 65)
- Education: Loyola Marymount University
- Occupations: Motivational speaker, author, professional tennis player
- Notable work: Think Again; How High Can You Bounce; Playing From The Heart
- Website: www.rogercrawford.com

Roger Crawford (born October 8, 1960) is a tennis player and a motivational speaker. He was the first Division I college athlete to compete with a disability affecting all four limbs. Crawford was born with ectrodactyly, and only has three fingers; one on his right and two on his left. He is also missing his left leg and some toes on his right foot. Sports Illustrated has recognized Roger as "One of the most accomplished, physically challenged athletes in history!" He's also the recipient of the ITA Achievement Award, presented by the International Tennis Hall of Fame.
