= Michael Crawford (disambiguation) =

Michael Crawford (born 1942) is an English actor and singer.

Michael Crawford may also refer to:

- Michael Crawford (historian) (born 1939), British numismatist and ancient historian
- Michael Crawford (cricketer) (1920–2012), English cricketer
- Michael Lindsay Coulton Crawford, Royal Navy submariner
- Mike Crawford (born 1974), former NFL and XFL linebacker
- Michael Crawford (politician) (born 1982), a member of the Illinois House of Representatives
- Michael Crawford, Canadian NDP candidate for the riding of Kamloops—Thompson—Cariboo in the 2008 Canadian federal election
- Michael Crawford, a character from the soap opera The Young and the Restless
