= Kristopher Crawford =

American physician and politician

Member of the South Carolina House of Representatives from the 63rd district
- In office 2006–2014

Personal details
- Born: 1969 (age 56–57) Anderson, Indiana
- Party: Republican
- Education: The Citadel, Medical University of South Carolina
- Profession: Physician

Kristopher "Kris" Crawford (born 1969) is an American emergency room physician, businessman, and former politician. He currently serves as the director of emergency services at Mountain View Regional Medical Center.

Previously, Crawford served as a Republican in the South Carolina House of Representatives being elected to SC District 63 in 2006, 2008, 2010, 2012, and 2014.

== Early life and education ==
Crawford was born in 1969 in Anderson, Indiana. He graduated from The Citadel in 1992 with a degree in biology, and earned his M.D. from the Medical University of South Carolina in 2001. He completed a family medicine residency at McLeod Regional Medical Center between 2001 and 2004. He served on Governor Sanford's Task Force on healthcare.

== Medical career ==
After completing his residency, Crawford began his private practice at Crawford Medical, LLC and also began working as an ER Staff Physician in Dillon, South Carolina for McLeod Medical Center Dillon. He served at this position from 2004 to 2005 and joined Lake City Community Hospital in 2005 subsequently became Emergency Medical Director until 2009. In 2010, he was named as the interim-medical director of Guardian Healthcare and again in 2011, he was named as regional medical director at EmCare, where served until 2018. He served as Emergency Medical Director at Medical University of SC at Lancaster for American Physician Partners. He then relocated to a new role with American Physician Partners at Mountain View Regional Medical Center in Las Cruces, New Mexico where he currently practices. During his tenure at Mountain View, Crawford was promoted to Regional Medical Director for Arizona, New Mexico, and Texas, where he managed the transition of services at his hospitals when American Physician Partners filed bankruptcy in 2023.

In 2010, Crawford was charged with failing to file seven state tax documents, which he attributed to a miscommunication with his tax accountant. After a mistrial due to a hung jury in April 2012, he was re-tried and convicted, receiving a $10,000 fine.

== Political career ==
Crawford was elected to the South Carolina General Assembly in 2006. He served on the Labor, Commerce and Industry and Rules committees. During his tenure, Crawford introduced South Carolina Telemedicine Reimbursement Act (SCMA), which authorized physicians and health care providers to ask for fee for the telemedicine services provided in a certain manner through phone, fax and electronic mail.

In 2013, Crawford introduced a bill proposing to shift the licensing of midwives in South Carolina from the Department of Health and Environmental Control (DHEC) to the Department of Labor, Licensing and Regulation (LLR), aligning it with the regulation of other medical professionals. He advocated for the bill as a safety measure and included a provision requiring obstetrician supervision of all midwife-assisted deliveries. However, the bill faced opposition from 2,000 mothers and citizens who were concerned it would effectively ban home births. In response to the backlash, Crawford expressed his support for home births and considered amending the bill.

Crawford introduced a bill, H.4795, aimed at curtailing unconstitutional surveillance by the National Security Agency (NSA). The legislation prohibited governmental support or assistance to federal agencies in collecting electronic data for warrantless spying. In 2014, he successfully passed another bill that legalized the use of cannabis oil for treating epilepsy, provided that the patient has a prescription or is participating in a clinical trial.

Previously, Crawford had shown support for Mike Pence and subsequently Governor Chris Christie of New Jersey, aiming to draft them into the 2012 U.S. presidential election and praising their leadership. When Christie did not run, Crawford shifted his support to Newt Gingrich in the Republican presidential primary. Gingrich ultimately carried South Carolina in the Republican presidential primary.
