= Kenneth Crawford =

British Army general (1895–1961)

General Sir Kenneth Crawford KCB MC
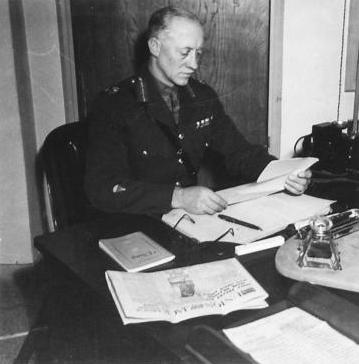
- Lieutenant-General Crawford in 1946
- Born: 25 June 1895; Colombo, Ceylon
- Died: 5 March 1961 (aged 65); Hove, Sussex, England
- Military career
- Allegiance: United Kingdom
- Branch: British Army
- Service years: 1915–1953
- Rank: General
- Service number: 10226
- Unit: Royal Engineers
- Commands: British Forces in Greece (1946–1947); Army Gas School (1940)
- Conflicts: First World War; Second World War
- Awards: Knight Commander of the Order of the Bath; Military Cross

General Sir Kenneth Noel Crawford, KCB, MC (25 June 1895 – 5 March 1961) was a British Army officer who reached high office in the 1940s.

== Early life and education ==
Crawford was born in Colombo, Ceylon, the son of Henry Leighton Crawford of the Ceylon Civil Service. He was educated at Clifton College and the Royal Military Academy, Woolwich. He was an active rugby player, and played for the army in 1921.

== Military career ==
Crawford was commissioned into the Royal Engineers in February 1915 and went on to serve in the First World War, being awarded the Military Cross in 1919.

Attending the Staff College, Camberley, from 1929 to 1930, Crawford also served in the Second World War, joining the British Expeditionary Force to France in 1939. He became director of chemical warfare for the Home Forces in 1940, was appointed deputy adjutant-general in 1942, and director of air at the War Office in 1943.

After the war, Crawford was made general officer commanding British Forces in Greece. In 1947 he was appointed deputy chief of the Imperial General Staff and, in 1949, he became controller at the Ministry of Supply. In 1952 he was made chairman of the Royal Ordnance Factories Board of Management; he retired in 1953.

Crawford was also Chief Royal Engineer from 1958 to 1961.

== Personal life ==
In retirement, Crawford joined the boards of several companies, including Edwin Dank (Oldbury) Ltd., Westland Aircraft, and Penmen and Company, Ltd. He was president of the Army Rugby Union, from 1948 to 1953.

In 1921, Crawford married Doris Margaret Parker, daughter of Joseph Parker of the Indian Civil Service, with whom he had two sons and a daughter.

== Bibliography ==
- Crawford, Kenneth Noel. (1954) Problems of weapon development in the cold war

Military offices
Preceded by Sir Sidney Kirkman	Deputy Chief of the Imperial General Staff; 1947–1949	Succeeded by Sir John Whiteley
Honorary titles
Preceded by Sir Edwin Morris	Chief Royal Engineer; 1958–1961	Succeeded by Sir Frank Simpson
