= Victor Crawford =

American lawyer and politician

Member of the Maryland Senate
- In office 1969–1983

Member of the Maryland House of Delegates
- In office 1967–1969

Personal details
- Born: Victor L. Crawford; April 19, 1932 Richmond, Virginia, U.S.
- Died: March 2, 1996 (aged 63) Johns Hopkins Hospital, Baltimore, Maryland, U.S.
- Cause of death: Throat cancer
- Party: Democratic
- Education: Hargrave Military Academy; University of Maryland, College Park; Georgetown University Law Center
- Profession: Politician, lawyer

Military service
- Allegiance: United States
- Branch/service: United States Army
- Years of service: 1952–1955

Victor L. Crawford (April 19, 1932 – March 2, 1996) was an American lawyer and politician.

Born in Richmond, Virginia. Crawford went to Hargrave Military Academy and the Washington, D.C. public schools. Crawford served in the United States Army from 1952 to 1955. In 1958, Crawford received his bachelor's degree from the University of Maryland and his law degree from Georgetown Law Center in 1960. He was admitted to the Maryland bar in 1960 and lived in Chevy Chase, Maryland. Crawford served in the Maryland House of Delegates from 1967 to 1969 and was a Democrat. He then served in the Maryland Senate from 1969 to 1983. Crawford died from throat cancer in the Johns Hopkins University Hospital in Baltimore, Maryland.
