= Crawford family murders =

1970 killing of Australian family

- Therese, Katherine, James, and Karen Crawford, circa 1969
- Date: 1-2 July 1970
- Location: 136 Cardinal Road, Glenroy, Victoria, Australia 37.698896°S 144.930003°E (approximate)
- Cause: Bludgeoning; Electrocution
- Motive: Unknown. Possible financial gain and/or rage
- Participants: Elmer Kyle Crawford
- Deaths: Therese Crawford (35); Katherine Jane Crawford (12); James William Crawford (8); Karen Jean Crawford (6)
- Burial: Fawkner Memorial Park, Merri-bek, Victoria
- Convicted: Unapprehended

The Crawford family murders took place at the family's home in July 1970 at the Crawford home in Glenroy, Victoria, Australia. Pregnant mother Therese Crawford and her three children were murdered, their bodies being discovered on 2 July in the family car, located at the bottom of a cliff at Loch Ard Gorge in Port Campbell. The husband, and father of the children, Elmer Kyle Crawford (b. May 1930), is the prime suspect in the murders and has not been seen since.

== Investigation ==
Two weeks before the murders, Elmer Crawford, an employee of the Victoria Racing Club (VRC), and his pregnant wife Therese drafted new wills that left a considerable fortune to Elmer in the event of his family's death. At the time of the murders, the couple had three children: Katherine Jane (aged 12), James William (aged 8), and Karen Jean (aged 6). It is believed by investigators that the impending arrival of their fourth child and Therese's mental state were the triggers for the murders. Another factor could have been the theft of goods by Elmer from the VRC.

A July 1971 coroner's inquest found that Elmer, who had emigrated from Ireland in 1951, murdered his wife and three children at the family's home in Cardinal Road, Glenroy. Elmer had constructed an electrocution device, using a 15-metre (49 ft) length of electrical lead and alligator clips, which he attached to his wife's ears while she slept before electrocuting her. He then battered Karen to death, presumably using the hammer found in the car, and electrocuted both Katherine and James.

Crawford's 1956 Holden FE sedan is winched to the top of Loch Ard Gorge on the afternoon of 2 July 1970

Elmer then loaded the blanket-wrapped bodies, along with a motorbike, fuel cans, rifle and hose, into the family's Holden FE sedan (with registration number HKU-061). He then drove them 240 kilometres (150 mi) to Port Campbell, where he connected the hose from the exhaust to the driver's side window before pushing the car over the cliff edge in an effort to frame his wife by making the crime look like a murder-suicide. To aid the vehicle's movement, he had also laid a stone pathway across a drainage ditch in front of the vehicle.

== Search ==
Elmer, who was last seen in his driveway on the day of the vehicle's discovery, has been missing since the murders, although he was reportedly spotted in 1994 in Western Australia by an acquaintance. A reward of A$100,000 was offered in 2008 for information leading to his arrest. In July 2010, Victorian Police announced that they were, in conjunction with the FBI, attempting to identify a man, via facial recognition technology, who died in 2005 in San Angelo, Texas, United States, whom they believed to be Elmer. The man had no fingerprints and carried multiple identity documents. It was announced on 27 August 2010 that comparison of DNA from a Crawford blood relative ruled out any connection to the body in the US.

== Media ==
An episode of Sensing Murder titled "Almost Perfect" which aired on 30 May 2006 featured the crime. Detailed investigation in Greg Fogarty's 2011 book, Almost Perfect: The True Story of the Crawford Family Murders, takes a close look at the case from the perspective of someone who lived in the same street at the time of the crime. The case was also detailed in a 2016 episode of Felon True Crime Podcast and in episode 290 of Casefile true crime podcast.

== See also ==
- Cold case
- Crime in Australia
- Familicide
- List of fugitives from justice who disappeared

== Cited works and further reading ==
- Fogarty, Greg (1997). Almost Perfect: The True Story of the Brutal, Unsolved Crawford Family Murders. Bloomington: Penon Publishing. ISBN 978-1-450-28516-2.
- Ford, Justine (2015). Unsolved Australia: Terrible Crimes, Incredible Stories. Sydney: Pan Macmillan Australia. ISBN 978-1-743-53436-6.
