= Stewart Crawford =

British diplomat (1913–2002)

Sir Robert Stewart Crawford GCMG CVO (27 August 1913 – 11 October 2002, Oxfordshire), known as Stewart Crawford, was a British diplomat.

== Background ==
Crawford was the son of Sir William Crawford, founder of the advertising agency W. S. Crawford Ltd.

== Education ==
After five years at Gresham's School, Holt, Norfolk, he spent a term at University of Tübingen before going up to Oriel College, Oxford, where he took a First in Philosophy, Politics, and Economics.

== Career ==
- 1936: Joined the Air Ministry as a civil servant
- 1940-1946: Private Secretary to the Chief of Air Staff
- 1946-1947: Assistant Secretary, Control Office for Germany and Austria
- 1954-1956: Counsellor, British Embassy, Norway
- 1957-1959: Counsellor, later Minister, British Embassy, Baghdad
- 1959-1960: Deputy UK Delegate to Organization for European Economic Co-operation
- 1961-1965: Assistant Under Secretary, Foreign Office
- 1966-1970: UK Political Resident, Persian Gulf
- 1970-1973: Deputy Under-Secretary of State, Foreign and Commonwealth Office
- 1973-1974: Chairman, Committee on Broadcasting Coverage
- 1976-1984: Member of BBC General Advisory Council

== Family ==
Crawford married Mary Katharine Corbett, daughter of Eric Corbett. They had four sons and one daughter.

== Honours ==
- Companion of the Order of St Michael and St George, 1951
- Commander, Royal Victorian Order, 1955
- Knight Commander of the Order of St Michael and St George, 1966
- Knight Grand Cross of the Order of St Michael and St George, 1973
