= Joseph Crawford =

Joseph or Joe Crawford may refer to:

- Joey Crawford (born 1951), American basketball referee
- Joe Crawford (basketball) (born 1986), American basketball player
- Joe Crawford (baseball) (born 1970), American baseball player
- Joseph Crawford (trade unionist) (1910–?), British trade unionist
- Joseph Crawford (academic) (1994-), Australian academic and entrepreneur
- Joseph Edmund Crawford (1877–1964), Ontario political figure
- Joseph H. Crawford Jr. (born 1932), American science fiction collector
- Buddie Petit (1890–1931), American musician born Joseph Crawford
- Black Hawk (lacrosse) (or Joe Crawford), a Canadian lacrosse player on the Mohawk team in the 1904 Olympics
