= Arron Crawford =

Australian cricketer

Personal information
- Full name: Arron Wesley Crawford
- Born: 29 September 1983 (age 43); Midland, Western Australia
- Height: 1.94 m (6 ft 4 in)
- Batting: Left-handed
- Bowling: Left-arm fast-medium
- Role: Bowler

Domestic team information
- Years: Team
- 2008/09: Western Australia
- FC debut: 10 October 2008 Western Australia v New South Wales
- Last FC: 21 November 2008 Western Australia v Victoria

Career statistics
Competition	First-class
Matches	3
Runs scored	8
Batting average	–
100s/50s	0/0
Top score	6*
Balls bowled	413
Wickets	7
Bowling average	31.85
5 wickets in innings	0
10 wickets in match	0
Best bowling	3/36
Catches/stumpings	2/–
- Source: CricketArchive, 13 October 2011

Arron Crawford (born 29 September 1983) is an Australian cricketer who played for Western Australia. He made his debut in October 2008, replacing the injured Ben Edmondson.
