= Katy Crawford =

American Christian musician (born 1987)

- Also known as: Katy Crawford
- Born: Katlyn Marie Crawford; August 13, 1987 (age 39); Dallas, Texas, U.S.
- Genres: Worship, Christian pop
- Occupations: Singer, songwriter
- Instrument: Vocals
- Years active: 2015–present
- Website: katycrawfordmusic.com

Katlyn Marie "Katy" Crawford (born August 13, 1987) is an American Christian musician, who primarily plays a style of contemporary worship music and Christian pop music. She has released three musical works, Pour Te louer (2015), an extended play, Our Love Story (2016), a studio album, and Closer (2017), an extended play.

== Early life and background ==
Crawford was born, Katlyn Marie Crawford, on August 13, 1987, in Dallas, Texas, the daughter of Pastor Ronald William Crawford and Deborah Ruth Madden, where she was raised with an elder sister, Kelly Beth Crawford. Her father is the head pastor of The Father's Church in Dallas, Texas. As an adolescent, she made frequent trips to Europe, especially France, where she learned the French language on these missionary trips with her father. She received her baccalaureate in French from Southern Methodist University in 2009, before going on to earn her masters degrees in both French and Secondary Education from University of North Texas in 2011, where her graduate thesis was France and the United States: Borrowed and Shared National Symbols. Crawford is a French teacher at Bishop Lynch High School.

== Music career ==
Her music recording career started in 2015, with the French-language extended play, Pour Te louer. While her second release was an English-language studio album, Our Love Story, released on July 15, 2016. Her most recent release, Closer, an extended play, was released in late 2017.

== Discography ==
- Pour Te louer (2015, EP)
- Our Love Story (July 15, 2016, LP)
- Closer (2017, EP)
