= Garry Crawford =

British sociologist

- Born: Wolverhampton
- Scientific career
- Fields: Sociology, Leisure Studies, Cultural Studies, Game studies
- Institutions: University of Salford

Garry Crawford is a British sociologist.

His interests in fans, audiences, and consumption have led Garry Crawford to publish on a wide range of subjects including cultural studies, cosplay, gender, leisure, classical music, and, most notably, sports fans and video game culture.

Garry Crawford works at the University of Salford, where he is a professor of Cultural Sociology and Lead Professor for the Social Sciences. He established and was the first Director of the University of Salford Digital Cluster, which the British governments’ Department for Business Innovation and Skills (BIS) report Higher Ambitions described as "a forum and centre of excellence, which combines and leads on high quality research, academic enterprise and teaching in areas of informatics, digital media, and new and convergent technologies".

He is a member of the British Sociological Association and the Leisure Studies Association. He was the first review editor for, and helped found and establish, the journal Cultural Sociology. He also co-created and was the first editor of the school-focused website Discover Sociology. He is a member of the University of Salford's Connected Lives Research group.

Garry Crawford is a Fellow of the Academy of Social Science and a Principal Fellow of the HEA.

== Sports Fan Studies & Early Career ==
Garry Crawford began his academic career as a researcher at the Sir Norman Chester Centre for Football Research at the University of Leicester, where he worked as a researcher and consultant on several projects, such as Asians Can't Play Football. Following this, his doctoral research (at the University of Salford) and subsequent early publications focused on British ice hockey, its history, and supporters.

His first book Consuming Sport (2004) was the first book to offer a detailed consideration of how sport is experienced and engaged with in the everyday lives, social networks, and consumer patterns of its followers which Martin Johnes in the International Journal of the History of Sport described as "a very important contribution to the field of sports studies".

Sports fan culture is an area where Garry Crawford continues to work and publish, such as his edited collection with Stefan Lawrence on Digital Football Cultures (2019).

== Game Studies ==
Another area where Garry Crawford has made significant and important contributions to is the study video game culture. Significantly, his early work here focused most notably on sports video games, but beyond this his work expanded to explore the sociology of video games in his book Video Gamers (2012), and then (with Daniel Muriel) the growing social and cultural significance of video game culture in their book Video Games as Culture (2018). Video Games as Culture not only considers contemporary video game culture, but also explores how video games provide important insights into the modern nature of digital and participatory culture, patterns of consumption and identity formation, later modernity and contemporary political rationalities.

Closely connected to this is his work on cosplay culture, and in particular his book with the practicing artist David Hancock Cosplay and the Art of Play. This book offers an introduction to cosplay as a subculture and community built around playful spaces and everyday practices of crafting costumes, identities, and performances. This book draws on new and original ethnographic research with cosplayers, but moreover, also employs more innovative arts-led practice research.

== Selected publications ==
- Cosplay and the Art of Play (2019) (with David Hancock)
- Digital Football Cultures (2019) (edited with Stefan Lawrence)
- Video Games as Culture (2018) (with Daniel Muriel)
- Introducing Cultural Studies (Third Edition) (2017) (with Brian Longhurst, Greg Smith, Gaynor Bagnall and Michael Ogborn)
- Video Gamers (2012)
- Online Gaming in Context: The Social and Cultural Significance of Online Gaming (2011) (edited with Victoria K. Gosling & Ben Light)
- Theorising the Contemporary Sports Supporter (2010)
- The Sage Dictionary of Leisure Studies (2009) (with Tony Blackshaw)
- Introducing Cultural Studies (Second Edition) (2008) (with Brian Longhurst, Greg Smith, Gaynor Bagnall and Michael Ogborn)
- Consuming Sport: Sport, Fans, and Culture (2004)
