= Allen Crawford =

American artist & illustrator

Allen Crawford is an artist, illustrator, designer, and writer.

Crawford and his wife Susan founded the design and illustration studio Plankton Art Co. in 1996. Their studio's most notable project to date is the collection of 400 species identification illustrations that are on permanent display at the American Museum of Natural History’s Milstein Hall of Ocean Life in New York.

Under the pseudonym “Lord Breaulove Swells Whimsy”, Crawford wrote, designed, and illustrated The Affected Provincial’s Companion, Volume One (Bloomsbury 2006), which was optioned for film by Johnny Depp’s production company, Infinitum Nihil.

Crawford's second book, Whitman Illuminated: Song of Myself (Tin House Books), is an illustrated, hand-lettered, 256-page edition of Walt Whitman’s iconic poem, was released in 2014. It has won numerous awards, including Best of Show in the 3x3 Illustration Annual No.12 and a Gold Medal from the Society of Illustrators.

His most recent book is A Wild Promise: An Illustrated Celebration of the Endangered Species Act (Tin House 2023).

== Bibliography ==
- The Affected Provincial's Companion Vol. I (2006)
- Whitman Illuminated: Song of Myself (2014)
- A Wild Promise: An Illustrated Celebration of the Endangered Species Act (2023)
