= Eddie Crawford =

American football player (1934–2017)

No. 21
- Positions: Defensive back, end

Personal information
- Born: July 25, 1934; Jackson, Tennessee, U.S.
- Died: July 9, 2017 (aged 82); Tupelo, Mississippi, U.S.
- Listed height: 6 ft 3 in (1.91 m)
- Listed weight: 185 lb (84 kg)

Career information
- High school: Central Merry (TN)
- College: Mississippi
- NFL draft: 1956: 13th round, 153rd overall pick

Career history
- New York Giants (1957)

Career NFL statistics
- Receptions: 2
- Receiving yards: 40
- Interceptions: 1
- Stats at Pro Football Reference

Edward Slater Crawford III (July 25, 1934 – July 9, 2017) was an American professional football player who played for the New York Giants of the National Football League (NFL). He played college baseball, basketball, and football at the University of Mississippi.

Crawford served as the head coach of the Ole Miss Rebels basketball team from 1962 to 1968.

Crawford died of Alzheimer's disease in 2017.
