= T. Stephen Crawford =

American chemical engineer (1900–1987)

Thomas Stephen Crawford (1900–1987) was an American chemical engineer known for his research in coal, coal tar and coal gasification. He served as dean of the college of engineering at the University of Rhode Island between 1945 and 1968, and namesake of Crawford Hall at the university.

== Biography ==
T. Stephen Crawford was born in the village of Linton-on-Ouse, near Durham, England on 14 January 1900 to John and Sarah Jane Crawford. John Crawford was employed as a coal miner in the Durham region until he and his whole family immigrated to America in 1913 aboard the RMS Lusitania. The family settled in Kingwood, West Virginia. Upon graduation from high school in 1918, Crawford began his career following his father by working as a coal miner in Elkins Mine No. 4 near Kingwood. He took his B.S. in chemistry at West Virginia University in 1925, and went on at the same institution to earn his master's degree in chemistry in 1927. He earned his Ph.D. in chemical engineering from the Columbia University in 1931. Crawford married Charlotte Sibert Grayson in 1930, and they had one daughter, Phyllis Lenore (Crawford) Grdenick (b. 1940).

Crawford began his professional career as a chemical engineer with the Socony-Vacuum Oil Company in 1931. Five years later in 1936, he joined the engineering faculty at Rhode Island State College; he became dean of the college in 1945 and served in that capacity until his retirement in 1969. In 1952 Crawford was one of three engineering educators to be selected as a year-long participant in the Year-in-Industry program sponsored by the DuPont Chemical Company, and he was named "Engineer of the Year" in 1964 by the Rhode Island Society of Professional Engineers. He was a charter member and first president of the Rhode Island Section of the American Society of Chemical Engineers in 1953, and from 1958 to 1959, he was the chairman of the engineering division of the National Association of State Universities and Land-Grant Colleges.

== Community service and legacy ==
Crawford was an active member of the community in South Kingstown, serving as president of the Tavern Hall Club in 1943. He served as the organist at the Episcopal Church of the Ascension in Wakefield, Rhode Island for 47 years and served 18 years on the board of trustees of South County Hospital. In 1963, the chemical engineering building at the University of Rhode Island was named Crawford Hall in his honor.
