= Johnstone Gallery =

Commercial art gallery operating in Brisbane 1951–1972

Coordinates: 27°26′49.42″S 153°02′10.73″E

The Johnstone Gallery was a private gallery located in the suburb of Bowen Hills in Brisbane, Queensland, Australia co-owned by Brian Johnstone and his wife, Marjorie Johnstone (née Mant). It was the leading Brisbane commercial gallery exhibiting contemporary Australian art from 1950 until 1972.

== History ==
=== Establishment ===
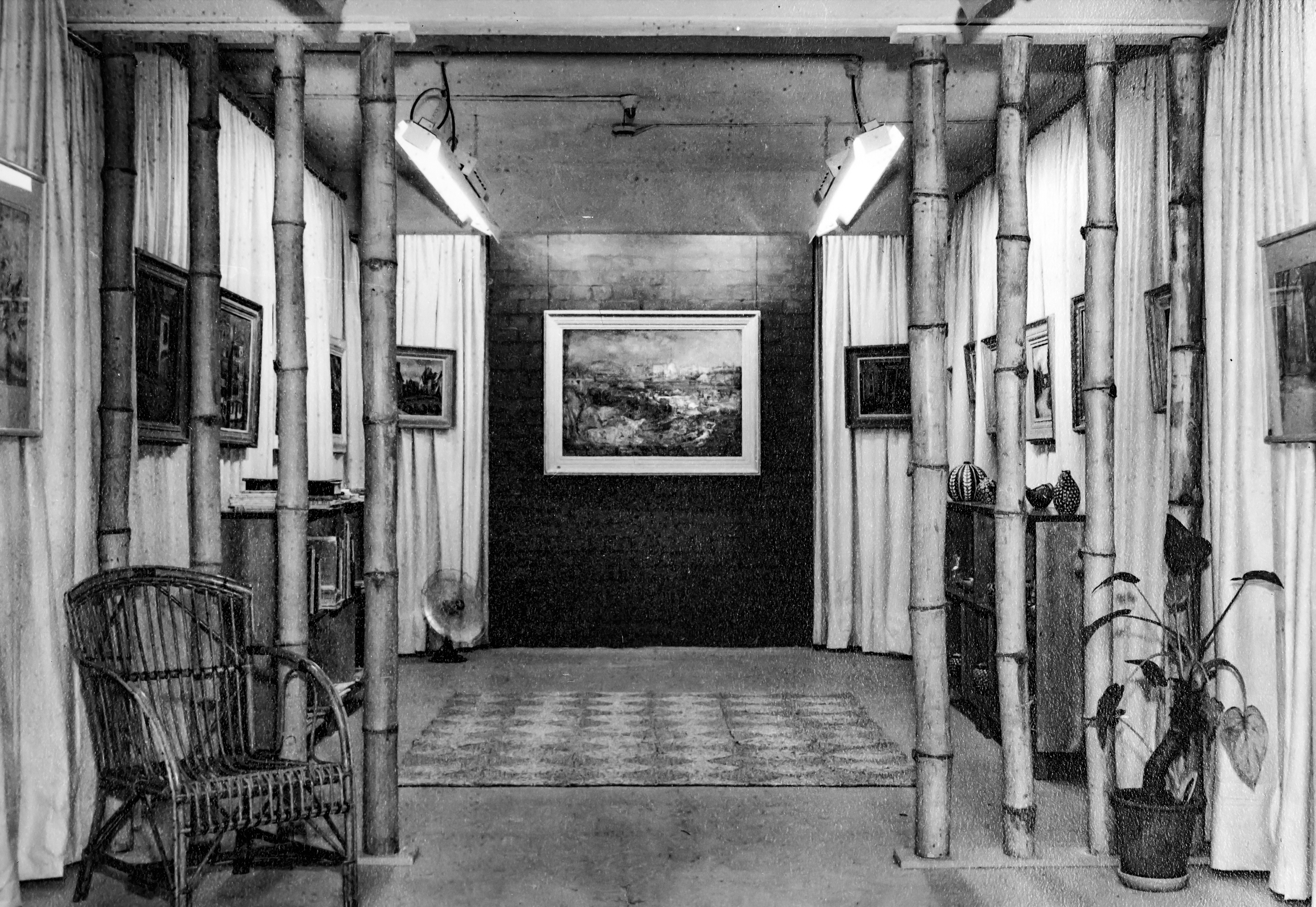
Interior of the Johnstone Gallery at the Brisbane Arcade

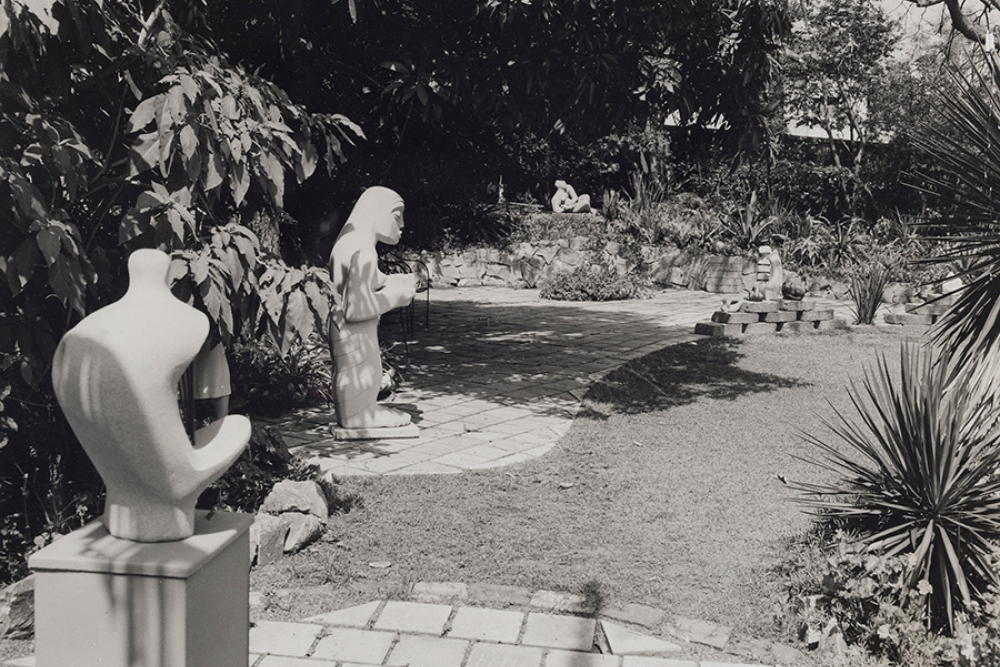
Johnstone home garden in Cintra Rd in Bowen Hills, 1952, the final site of The Johnstone Gallery

Brian Johnstone ran Marodian Gallery at 452 Upper Edward Street, Spring Hill, during 1950–1951 in a gallery at the rear of Hugh Hale's interior decorating shop. The partnership terminated when Hale criticised an Arthur Boyd exhibition. Johnstone Gallery then moved to the basement of the Brisbane Arcade, into what had been an air-raid shelter, from 1952 to 1957 before it was permanently sited at 6 Cintra Road, Bowen Hills in 1958 in a purpose-built space in a sub-tropical rainforest setting. There, owners Brian and Marjorie Johnstone showed most major Australian artists of the period, including Sir Sidney Nolan, Robert Dickerson, Lawrence Daws, Margaret Olley (whose 1962 exhibition sold out at the opening for £3000, then a record for an Australia woman artist), Charles Blackman, Ray Crooke, John Coburn, Arthur Boyd, Donald Friend, Laurence Hope and others in post-war Brisbane which had few visual art offerings beyond Queensland Art Gallery.

=== Theatre ===
The sub-tropical rainforest garden was also the stage for theatre, including a production by Twelfth Night Theatre, then situated in inner city Wickham Terrace, of Aristophanes' Lysistrata with the set and costumes designed by Quentin Hole, 24–27 April 1962. With plans from 1966 to establish a unique suburban artistic precinct in Brisbane the couple formed a committee to permanently establish what would become the new location of Twelfth Night Theatre. Prior to the commencement of building it, a production of Under Milk Wood by Dylan Thomas was staged in a tent on the site. Construction began in 1969 and the theatre opened in February 1971 under the direction of Joan Whalley, with two productions, A Flea in Her Ear by Georges Feydeau and The Rose and the Ring a musical based on the fireside pantomime written by William Makepeace Thackeray. The Johnstones were delighted, as Brian wrote to Sidney Nolan:

"...with the new half-million dollar theatre next door, the establishment is now nicely rounded off, so perhaps one of these days Marjorie and I will be able to play ladies and gentlemen of the art world!"

The theatre continues under the directorship of Gail Wiltshire.

== Legacy ==
Johnstone Gallery closed in December 1972, and the gallery buildings have since been demolished and the rainforest gardens lost to the development of townhouses. Following the closure Brian Johnstone operated an art consultancy for a few years.

In 1994, after her death in 1993, the estate of Marjorie Johnstone bequeathed the Johnstone Gallery Archive to the State Library of Queensland. The collection features 26 bound volumes of scrapbooks, gallery files, printed exhibition catalogues, correspondence, photographs, and is a major resource for provenance research of Australian artworks and artists. Photographer Arthur Davenport recorded many of the artworks and gallery installations from 1964 to 1972, which can be seen in the State Library of Queensland's Arthur Davenport collection. The State Library has also produced a series of digital stories and oral histories with many of the artists and gallery owners who were associated with the Johnstone Gallery - John White, Philip Bacon, Victor Mace and artists Nevil Matthews, Margaret Olley, Laurence Daws, Ray Crooke, Roy Churcher, Betty Churcher, Robert Dickerson and Max Hurley.

The Johnstone Gallery Archive was added to UNESCO's Australian Memory of the World Register in 2021.

== Exhibitions ==
- 1952, Laurence Hope
- 1961, 14–30 Nov; Donald Friend
- 1962, February; William Peascod
- 1962, 28 April-10 May; 50 Drawings of old Brisbane, Kenneth Jack
- 1962, September; Fred Jessup
- 1962, October; Adrian Feint
- 1962, November; Margaret Olley
- 1962, December; John Coburn
- 1963, 28 July–; Moya Dyring
- 1963, August; Francis Lymburner
- 1963 13–28 Aug; Yulgilbar 1863-1963 and other paintings, Donald Friend
- 1964, 28 Feb-25 March; Arthur Boyd, Charles Blackman, Lawrence Daws
- 1964 14–22 April; Paintings by Shay Docking
- 1964, 13–25 June; Paintings and drawings by Mervyn Moriarty
- 1964, 14–29 July; James Gleeson
- 1964, 18–30 July; Peter Kennedy
- 1964, August; New Guinea paintings Ray Crooke, Baillieu Myer commission for 1964.
- 1964, 18 Sept-7 Oct; Recollections of Raratonga, Henry Bell
- 1964, 30 Oct- 19 Nov; Gordon Shepherdson downstairs in Gallery F
- 1964, 30 Oct- 19 Nov; John Åland
- 1964, 15 Nov-2-Dec; Brian Seidel
- 1964, 6–24 December; Alex Leckie
- 1965, 8–23 June; Paintings by June Stephenson
- 1965, 21 Sept-6 Oct; Ken Reinhard
- 1965, 12–27 Oct; Michael Kmit
- 1966, 4–21 September; Alice in Wonderland, Charles Blackman
- 1967, 21 March–5 April: Rosemary Ryan
- 1967, 25 July-9 August, Arthur Boyd
- 1967, 17 Oct-1 Nov; Paintings by Lawrence Daws
- 1968, 14–26 Oct; Leaves from a New Guinea Sketch Book and other paintings by Margaret Olley
- 1969, 30 March-12 April; The Dolley Pond Church of God with signs following suite and other paintings by Lawrence Daws
- 1969, 30 March-12 April; People in miniature series, Ann Graham
- 1969, 22 June–5 July; A homage to Breughel, Manet, Daumier, Picasso, Degas, Rembrandt, Goya, Renoir, Robert Dickerson
- 1969, 13 July-2 August; Documenta espirita, Ignacio Marmol
- 1969, 10–23 August; Arthur Boyd
- 1969, 23 Nov-20 Dec; Sculpture by Guy Boyd
- 1969, 23 Nov-6 Dec; Laurence Hope
- 1970, 4–26 Sept; The 1913 mining disaster, paintings by Lawrence Daws
- 1970, 2–24 Oct; Paintings by Margaret Olley
- 1970, 30 Oct-21 Nov: An Experience of Paris: park, cathedral, city. Charles Blackman
- 1971, 9–31 July; Dust, Sidney Nolan
- 1971, 6–28 Aug; The Professionals and other people, Robert Dickerson
- 1972, 6–29 Sept; Anatomy of a Relationship, Lawrence Daws
- 1972,1–20 Oct; Homage, Margaret Olley
