= Rosemary Ryan (artist) =

Australian woman artist (1926–1996)

- Born: Rosemary Elizabeth Chesterman; 10 October 1926; Tasmania, Australia
- Died: 19 September 1996 (aged 69); Melbourne, Australia
- Education: National Gallery of Victoria Art School 1950-51, George Bell School 1950-52, Chelsea Polytechnic 1954–55
- Known for: Painting
- Movement: Hard Edge, Pop Art
- Spouse: Patrick Ryan
- Children: 2

Rosemary Ryan (10 October 1926 – 19 September 1996) was a mid to late twentieth-century Australian painter

== Early life and training ==
Born Rosemary Elizabeth Chesterman on 10 October 1926 in Tasmania, she was the only child of parents Thelma and Rupert Chesterman. Rosemary's mother died when she was five years old and her father remarried. The family moved to Melbourne in 1937 when she was eleven years old and where she was educated at St Catherine's in Toorak, where printmaker Barbara Brash, was a contemporary, both following Sunday Reed's earlier attendance.

Studying Humanities at Melbourne University she met German-born 24-year-old journalist Patrick Ryan. They married in 1949 and lived in Williams Road, South Yarra. They were remembered by members of the Boyd family as "delightful young things". (Note: an allusion to bright young things) Through her studies she developed a keen interest in art and enrolled at the National Gallery of Victoria Art School in 1950-1, and at the same time at George Bell's private school (whose classes she'd occasionally joined when she was a child) continuing there until 1952.

In August 1952 Patrick's father Rupert Sumner Ryan, grazier and Federal Liberal MP for Flinders since 1940, died leaving his property Edrington near Berwick and personal estate valued at £163,520 (worth over A$6m in 2021). Though largely estranged from his parents, Patrick as the only son inherited the majority of the legacy, selling his share of Edrington to his aunt Maie, wife of then Minister for External Affairs (later Governor-General) Richard G. Casey. The couple soon sailed for England, where Rosemary studied at the Chelsea Polytechnic 1954–55. There she showed two works in the Australian Artists’ Association (AAA) exhibition at Imperial Institute Art Gallery, London in 1956.

== Exhibiting artist ==
After their return to Melbourne the Ryan's son Domenic and daughter Siobhan were born before 1960, when Rosemary began regularly exhibiting her paintings in a series of solo shows held every two or three years until 1993.

Patrick joined Tim Burstall in forming Eltham Films as producer of its first film The Prize, which was awarded at the 1960 Venice Film Festival In 1969 the couple joined Burstall at the Moscow Film Festival for the showing of Two Thousand Weeks, Rosemary being its art director and Patrick the writer and producer. She also worked on scenery for at least one episode of Burstall's children's television program Sebastian the Fox. Son Domenic was inspired to become a filmmaker at age nine.

Early in her career Ryan experimented with using a spray gun in an approach to Pop Art, but consolidated her imagery in fin-de-siècle and Edwardian Australian idylls with a gentle feminist edge. Her friend Charles Blackman, one of whose Alice in Wonderland series she purchased in 1957, was an influence on her style, as was another close associate the naïve artist Mirka Mora, for whom in 1958 Rosemary helped decorate the Mora's Balzac restaurant for its opening, applying copper leaf across the ceiling.

She became known through exhibitions at John Reed's 1958–initiated Museum of Modern Art Australia, at the South Yarra Gallery, Australian Galleries, Powell Street Gallery and Libby Edward Galleries. In 1971 Rosalind Humphries reprised the historic 9 x 5 Impression Exhibition held at Buxton's Galleries in 1889, in her own eponymous Armadale gallery, and Ryan was among artists Charles Bush, Charles Blackman, Arthur, David and Hermia Boyd, John Brack, Ray Crooke, Noel Counihan, William Dargie, Asher Bilu, Lawrence Daws, William Frater, Robert Grieve, Louis Kahan, Daryl Lindsay, Mirka Mora, John Olsen, John Perceval, Clifton Pugh, Michael Shannon, and Brett Whitely who responded to Humphries' challenge to create a painting on nine-by-five inch cigar-box lids. By 1974 her works were selling at L’exposition gallery in Sydney for A$150–A$600 (a value of A$1,316.00–A$5,262.00 in 2021).

In 1979 Ryan painted the bodywork of Melbourne No.8 tram as an early contributor to the project ‘Transporting Art’ undertaken between 1978-1983 in which 16 older but still operating trams were decorated by artists and designers including Clifton Pugh, Mirka Mora, Howard Arkley, Gareth Sansom and Erica McGilchrist.

As remembered by Susan McCulloch, to prepare for her 1983 solo exhibition at Zanders Bond Gallery Ryan held a barbecue for 30 friends on the banks of the Yarra in November 1982, where they posed for her Australian version of Seurat’s La Grande Jatte, and Manet’s Dejeuner sur l’herbe.

The theme of another exhibition, in 1990, was the book Picnic at Hanging Rock by Joan Lindsay with whom Ryan was an acquaintance. Of the show Louis Montague remarked “Ryan has created a series of picnic vignettes. The naïve style of these recent works captures the Australian bush with the sort of youthful charm that this natural monument so often inspires.”

== Reception ==
Some early praise came when Ryan showed at the Victorian Artists' Society spring exhibition while still studying with George Bell in 1952, when The Bulletin picked out her Two-dimensional Still Life as "possibly the best of the abstractions."

Ryan's first solo show of 23 oil paintings at South Yarra Gallery in 1963 was attended by 250 visitors and launched a conspicuous career, with a positive review from an unnamed Age newspaper critic who wrote;

To classify Rosemary Ryan would be difficult: she is a sophisticated painter who adopts a primitive style and has a watchful eye for shop windows, children's games and family ceremonies. Her exhibition at the South Yarra Gallery has a note of fresh and unselfconscious observation and a lot of carefully camouflaged technical skill. She can organise a composition, whether it is a group of children playing in a garden, or a complicated view of women looking into a shop window in Chapel Street. Occasionally she probes more deeply, but her preoccupation is the observation of people, gossiping or eating or shopping, and she paints them with humanist directness.

Art historian and critic Bernard Smith in The Age reacted positively to her next show there 9 months later;

Rosemary Ryan's exhibition (South Yarra) is the surprise of the week. Victorian keepsakes, family albums, cameos and old photographs of young soldiers who went away to the wars are suggested in scumbled paint, rose-violet and acid-green, to evoke in Proustian fashion the quality of events half-remembered, half-forgotten. In Lost Race, a lush tropical garden submerges the colonial family and its Calvinistic high-mindedness as surely as the jungle submerged the ruins of Angkor Wat. It is a theme central to the Australian experience, and writers like Henry Handel Richardson, Martin Boyd, Margaret Kiddle and Patrick White have made much of it. It is clearly central to Rosemary Ryan's personal experience, also, and this is what gives her show an authentic quality. And it is technically of interest to see the pop practice of disparate imagery being put to a coherent purpose. instead of being lost among incoherent ambiguities.

In 1966 Smith identified Ryan’s contribution to the Georges Art Prize Diffusion as ‘outstanding’, in equal billing with works by Fred Williams, Louis James and Jacqueline Hick;

“Rosemary Ryan's Diffusion is an allegory on continuity and change; a kind of painting difficult to bring off. But this succeeds even if the personal meaning remains elusive. In the background is a recollection of Furse's Diana of the Uplands (a young woman alfresco with hounds on a moorland path) and William Butterfeld parsonage beyond: in the foreground, a young mother with two children, one advancing off-focus into blaze of sinister light. At left, a pattern of sea-shells. The surface, a fine, pleasant enamel. Refreshing to find an artist for whom life retains sanctity. Easier and much more tempting to treat it as a dirty joke.

In November that same year she was the subject, with Charles Reddington and Robert Jacks, of Anne Pickburn’s ABC radio program Perspective on “The "hard-edge" painters” on 3AR.

Ann Galbally however, in reviewing Ryan’s 1971 show at Australian Galleries, notes her deliberate imitation of old photographs and Victorian albums to evoke nostalgic sentiment; “What with smiling aviators, picnics in the bush, family parties and songs in the rain, life couldn't be sweeter, or sicklier,” and Maureen Gilchrist is ambivalent about her “cute tricks with old master themes,” in her solo show at Powell Street Gallery in 1976, asking, “Where does the artist stand in relation to her content? Does she, or does she not, condemn woman as objects? Who knows?

In a 1991 article advertising the sale of Ryan’s house of 20 years, 16 Gore Street, Fitzroy, Rhonda Dredge (daughter of artist Margaret Dredge) describes her as a ‘nostalgia artist’.

In 2006, McCulloch's New Encyclopaedia of Australian Art describes her paintings as having; "poetically evoked memories of country life in Australia in pre-WWII times and occasionally allegorical scenes."

== Later life ==
Ryan was active in the National Gallery of Victoria’s Women's Association and in 1987 was the subject of a portrait photograph made at Glenogle by Joyce Evans. Her husband Patrick died 15 Jul 1989.

She died 19 September 1996 in South Yarra, survived by her daughter Siobhan and her son Domenic, who remembered "She was a loved daughter, a selfless mother, a generous friend, a witty conversationalist, a wonderful host, sometimes a stern matriarch and a caring grandmother." She is interred at Mount Macedon cemetery, 15 km south of Hanging Rock, the subject of her penultimate solo exhibition.

== Exhibitions ==
- 1952, October: Victorian Artists' Society spring exhibition. Victorian Artists' Society gallery, East Melbourne
- 1956, from 3 March: Australian Artists' Association exhibition, opened by Sir Thomas White, Australian High Commissioner. Imperial Institute Art Gallery, London
- 1958, October: Contemporary Art Society, Museum of Modern Art Australia, Melbourne
- 1963, July: solo show South Yarra Gallery
- 1965, March: solo show South Yarra Gallery
- 1965, 22–30 May: A unique exhibition of avant-garde art. Latchford Showroom, Foveaux Street, Surry Hills, New South Wales
- 1966, February: Georges Art Prize
- 1966–7: Gallery A. Summer exhibition 66, Australian paintings drawings watercolours sculpture. Gallery A
- 1967, 21 March–5 April: Rosemary Ryan, Johnstone Gallery, Brisbane
- 1969, from 24 March: with Richard Reardon, John Martin, Edward Kidson-Lord and Christopher White; Charity show to raise funds for Home for Unmarried Mothers, opened by Professor Vincent Buckley. Pink Pussy Cat Bistro, Cardigan Street, Carlton
- 1971, May: Australian Galleries (solo)
- 1971, to 23 October: The New 9X5 Impression Exhibition. Rosalind Humphries Galleries, 984 High Street, Armadale
- 1976, 30 March–20 April: solo Rosemary Ryan, Powell Street Gallery, 20 Powell st South Yarra
- 1978, 15–22 April: Recherche de Temps Perdu, opened by Professor Manning Clark. Anna Simons Gallery, Forrest
- 1978, to 30 August: Recherche de Temps Perdu. Leveson Street Gallery, North Melbourne Galleries
- 1983, October: Paintings by Rosemary Ryan, Zanders Bond gallery, Armadale
- 1990, February: Picnic at Hanging Rock: Rosemary Ryan. Libby Edwards Galleries, South Yarra
- 1993, 9–26 November: A [sic] recherche du temps perdu: Rosemary Ryan. Libby Edwards Gallery, South Yarra

== Bibliography ==
- McCulloch, Alan McCulloch, Susan McCulloch, Emily McCulloch-Childs. The New McCulloch's Encyclopedia of Australian Art. 4th Edition, Aus Art Melbourne & The Miegunyah Press, 2006. Page 852
- Germaine, Max. Artists and Galleries of Australia, Volumes 1 & 2, Third Edition. Craftsman Press, Sydney, 1990. Page 595
- Germaine, Max. A Dictionary of Women Artists of Australia. Craftsman House, Sydney, 1991. Page 396
- Australian Prints + Printmaking, a database listing printmaking artists from Australia, New Zealand and the Pacific region based on the print collection of the National Gallery of Australia.
