= Geoff Cartwright =

Australian actor

Geoff Cartwright is an actor, director, award-winning audio book reader, poet, author and high school teacher.

== Career ==
Cartwright is notable for his recurring role as Dr. Rob Bowen in the Australian drama All Saints, and for his roles in White Collar Blue, Water Rats and Murder Call.

In 1996 Cartwright won a TDK Australian Audio Book Award for his narration of Tim Winton's The Riders.

Cartwright is also notable in the live theatre scene, in both Brisbane and Sydney. Formerly an English & Drama teacher at a Catholic college on the Northern Beaches of Sydney, he was also the artistic director of the Rough Hewn Theatre Troupe, which called the Star of the Sea Theatre, Manly as its home. Geoff directed numerous Rough Hewn productions, offering a stepping stone opportunity to many young actors who have since studied at and graduated from prestigious drama schools in Australia and abroad. He now resides in Queensland and is actively involved in Calanthe Poetry.

== Filmography ==
=== Films ===
Year	Title	Role	Type
1969	Age of Consent	Newsboy	Feature film
1996	Whipping Boy	Pathologist	TV movie

=== Television ===
Year	Title	Role	Type
1984	Special Squad	Dusan Narros	Episode 29: "Killer"
1987	Sons and Daughters	Doctor	Episode 870
1988	A Country Practice	Clem Barker	Season 8, episode 6: "Learning the Lessons: Part 2"
1989	Rafferty's Rules	Carl Jensen	Season 5, episode 4: "In for a Penny"
1990	Fresh Start		Episode: "Mick"
1992	G.P.	Andrew Mason	Season 4, episode 30: "A Question of Survival"
1992	Police Rescue	Drunk Driver	Season 2, episode 7: "Sugar"
1994	Sky Trackers	Photo Journalist	Season 1, episode 15: "Tree's a Crowd"
1996	Water Rats	Chris Walsh	Season 1, episode 15: "Eyewitness"
1997	Home and Away	Peter	Episode 2224
1997	Murder Call	Ted Heffernan	Season 1, episode 12: "Wages of Sin"
1998–99	All Saints	Dr. Rob Bowen	Seasons 1–2, 8 episodes
2002	White Collar Blue	Colin Meredith	Episode 10

== Theatre ==
=== As actor ===
Year	Title	Role	Venue / Co.
1978	Flight Path	Understudy	SGIO Theatre with Queensland Theatre
1978	When We Are Married	Fred Dyson	SGIO Theatre with Queensland Theatre
1978	Don't Piddle Against the Wind, Mate	Phillip Sutton	SGIO Theatre with Queensland Theatre
1978	Point of Departure	Mathias	SGIO Theatre with Queensland Theatre
1978–79	Clowneroonies	The Great Weevil	Valley Uniting Church Hall, Fortitude Valley, SGIO Theatre with Queensland Theatre
1978	King Lear	Knight / Servant	SGIO Theatre, Brisbane, Seymour Centre, Sydney with Queensland Theatre & Australian Elizabethan Theatre Trust
1979	The Coroner's Report / The Flaw	The Man / Husband	TN! Theatre Company
1979	Christie in Love	Christie	TN! Theatre Company
1979	Taurua of Tahiti	Tuiterai	ABC Radio Brisbane
1979	Miracles	Father Davidson	ABC Radio Brisbane
1979	Happy End	Dr Nakamura	Twelfth Night Theatre, Brisbane with TN! Theatre Company
1979	Travesties	Henry Carr	Twelfth Night Theatre, Brisbane with TN! Theatre Company
1979	The Les Darcy Show	Father Coady	Twelfth Night Theatre, Brisbane with TN! Theatre Company
1979	The Man Who Came to Dinner	Richard Stanley	SGIO Theatre with Queensland Theatre
1980	The Threepenny Opera	Narrator / Filch / Rev Kimble / Smith	Twelfth Night Theatre, Brisbane with TN! Theatre Company
1980	Alex, or, the Automatic Trial		Twelfth Night Theatre, Brisbane with TN! Theatre Company
1980	The Playboy of the Western World	Christopher Mahon	SGIO Theatre with Queensland Theatre
1980	Waiting for Godot	Estragon	Cement Box Theatre, Brisbane with TN! Theatre Company
1980	Outside Edge	Understudy	SGIO Theatre with Queensland Theatre
1980	Candida	Eugene Marchbanks	SGIO Theatre with Queensland Theatre
1980	Crushed by Desire	Inspector Corcoran	SGIO Theatre with Queensland Theatre
1981	Hamlet	Hamlet	Twelfth Night Theatre, Brisbane
1981	The Choir	Colin	Cement Box Theatre, Brisbane with TN! Theatre Company
1981	Skitz 'n' Frenzy		Twelfth Night Theatre, Brisbane with TN! Theatre Company
1981	Crossing Niagara	Carlo	Marian Street Theatre, Sydney
1981	Every Burglar Has a Silver Lining / La Veniexiana		Seymour Centre, Sydney
1981	Once Upon a Mattress	Jester	Marian Street Theatre, Sydney
1982	Saturday Sunday Monday	Federico, Giulianella'a fiance	SGIO Theatre with Queensland Theatre
1983	Macbeth		Phillip Street Theatre, Sydney with Peter Williams Productions
1984	An Act of Settlement		Sydney Opera House with Australian Elizabethan Theatre Trust for Sydney Festival
1984	Isadora		Universal Theatre, Melbourne with TG Williams Productions
1985	Woyzeck		Wayside Theatre, Sydney
1987	Desdemona and Othello		Sydney Opera House with Grin and Tonic for Sydney Festival
1988	Measure for Measure		Opera Theatre, Adelaide, Playhouse, Perth, Seymour Centre, Sydney with Associated Artists
1988	Hard Times		Ensemble Theatre, Sydney
1989	A Doll's House		Ensemble Theatre, Sydney
1989	Arms and the Man		Playhouse, Newcastle with Hunter Valley Theatre Company
1990	Simpson, J. 202		Ensemble Theatre, Sydney
1990	The Ring Cycle		Cremorne Theatre, Brisbane with QPAC
1991	Kurtz		Crossroads Theatre, Sydney
1991	Marina: Journey to the End		Seymour Centre, Sydney with Carnivale
1992	Murder by Misadventure		Marian Street Theatre, Sydney
1993	The Caretaker		Lookout Theatre, Sydney
1994	Zima Junction		Studio 202, Kelvin Grove
1994	Dancing at Lughnasa		Suncorp Theatre with Queensland Theatre
1999	Eyes to the Floor	Superintendent Naylor	Star of the Sea Theatre, Sydney with Rough Hewn Theatre Troupe
1999–2000	Face to Face		Ensemble Theatre, Sydney, Riverside Theatres Parramatta, Playhouse, Canberra, Bruce Gordon Theatre, Wollongong
2000	Seven Stories		Stables Theatre, Sydney with Ensemble Theatre
2001	Men of Honour		Ensemble Theatre, Sydney
2001	A Conversation		Ensemble Theatre, Sydney
2009	Macbeth	King Duncan	Star of the Sea Theatre, Sydney with Rough Hewn Theatre Troupe
2023	Under Milk Wood		Zamia Theatre with Tamborine Mountain Little Theatre (also director)

=== As director ===
Year	Title	Role	Venue / Co.
2007	Look! Out There Beyond the Waves	Director	Star of the Sea Theatre, Sydney with Rough Hewn Theatre Troupe
2008	The Virtuous Burglar	Director	Star of the Sea Theatre, Sydney with Rough Hewn Theatre Troupe
2008	Phaedra	Director	Star of the Sea Theatre, Sydney with Rough Hewn Theatre Troupe
2009	Tartuffe	Director	Star of the Sea Theatre, Sydney with Rough Hewn Theatre Troupe
2010	Our Country’s Good	Director	Star of the Sea Theatre with Rough Hewn Theatre Troupe
2011	The Taming of the Shrew	Producer	Star of the Sea Theatre, Sydney with Rough Hewn Theatre Troupe
2012	A Clockwork Orange	Director	Star of the Sea Theatre, Sydney with Rough Hewn Theatre Troupe
2013	The Fantasticks	Director	Star of the Sea Theatre, Sydney with Rough Hewn Theatre Troupe
2015	Miss Julie	Director	Star of the Sea Theatre, Sydney with Rough Hewn Theatre Troupe
2015	Jigsaws	Director	Star of the Sea Theatre, Sydney with Rough Hewn Theatre Troupe
2017	Parramatta Girls	Director	Star of the Sea Theatre, Sydney with Rough Hewn Theatre Troupe
2017	Write Young Women	Director	Rough Hewn Theatre Troupe
2019	Eyes to the Floor	Director / Set Designer	Star of the Sea Theatre, Sydney with Rough Hewn Theatre Troupe
2019	Morning Sacrifice	Director	Star of the Sea Theatre, Sydney with Rough Hewn Theatre Troupe
2023	Under Milk Wood	Director	Zamia Theatre with Tamborine Mountain Little Theatre
	The Crucible	Co-Director	Stella Maris College, Sydney
