= John Rigby (artist) =

Australian artist

John Thomas Rigby (9 December 1922 – 18 October 2012) was an Australian artist known for his tropical and bush landscapes, genre and portraits.

Rigby was born in Brisbane with most of his schooling in one-teacher country schools in the Palen Creek and Glass House Mountains areas where his father worked in saw mills. It was while living adjacent to the Glass House Mountains that he began to show an interest in art. By 1937, he had enrolled in art at the Brisbane Central Technical College and towards the end of that year, he was accepted into classes conducted by Brisbane artist Caroline Barker.

In the late 1930s, Rigby began work with a sign-writing company and then with an advertising agency. In March 1942, he enlisted with the Australian Military Forces serving with the 101 Australian Anti-Tank Regiment (later renamed the 101 Australian Tank Attack Attack Regiment) and then 1st Australian Army Intelligence. He served in Australia, New Guinea and New Britain before leaving the Army in September 1946 and commencing freelance commercial art and producing cartoon strips for The Sunday Mail in Brisbane.

Between 1948 and 1950, Rigby undertook a Diploma in Fine Art at the East Sydney Technical College during which time he and fellow art student Jon Molvig became close friends. He returned to Brisbane and commercial art as well as conducting art classes and having his first solo art exhibition at the Johnstone Gallery in 1954.

Rigby won the Italian Government Travelling Art Prize in 1955 and travelled to Italy for nearly a year and then spent part of 1957 in Britain before returning to Australia in early 1958. Later that year, he won the Women's Weekly Art Prize for Portraits, Australia's richest art prize at the time. He subsequently won many other prizes including the Sulman Prize for 1962. During his career, he had 24 portraits selected for hanging in the Archibald Prize, 24 in the Wynne Prize and 21 in the Sulman Prize. He was commissioned for various portraits, including Chancellors of universities.

John Rigby was a Trustee of the Queensland Art Gallery from 1969 to 1987 and Officer-in-Charge of Fine Art at the Queensland College of Art between 1974 and 1984. He received an honorary doctorate from Griffith University in 1994 for services to the arts and was made an honorary member of the Royal Queensland Art Society in 2001 and a Companion of the Queensland Academy of Arts and Sciences in 2003. He was the subject of a comprehensive book "John Rigby: Art and Life" launched by the Queensland Art Gallery in 2003. In 2004, the Museum of Brisbane held a special survey of his portraits spanning some 50 years.
