= Joyce Scott =

Australian artist

Joyce Scott FRSASA
- Born: Joyce Ellen Mottershead; 4 December 1938
- Education: BEd, GradDipEd(Art), DipDesign(Ceramics)
- Notable work: In the National Gallery of Australia Collection
- Awards: 3 International, 2 Australian

Joyce Scott FRSASA 'is an Australian artist working in drawing, oil painting and ceramics.' 'She has held ten independent exhibitions, is represented internationally and has received five awards.' 'Scott, née Mottershead, was born in Poynton, Cheshire, England in 1938 and migrated with her family to Adelaide, South Australia in 1951.'

== Highlights ==
Joyce Scott studied ceramics ‘in the early 1970s under the tutelage of Milton Moon, a dynamic teacher’. She '... received a Diploma of Design, Ceramics and a Graduate Diploma of Education (Art) from the Adelaide College of Art, and later qualified for a Bachelor of Education from the South Australian College of Advanced Education.' In 1976, Scott was made a Fellow of the Royal South Australian Society of Arts.

'A long-running relationship between the artist and Greenhill Galleries commenced with her first exhibition in 1974.' Art Critic Ivor Frances reported in a newspaper review, Pottery is Exciting, that ‘The [exhibition] pottery is large and sculptural, subtly coloured in harmonious glazes .. Joyce Scott has overcome many of the firing problems which occur in making large, light ceramic articles .. [and] the glazes crawl and break into fractured earth colours, browns and greens, all over the surface.’

'In awarding ... [Scott] first prize for the 1974 Carillion City Festival Ceramics Award, judge Kenneth Hood, then Curator of Decorative Arts and Senior Curator at the National Gallery of Victoria, described her entry as of "exceptional quality" and said: "Joyce Scott was clearly a potter of major talent ... [who] manages to combine a feeling of massiveness with a sense of lightness, even elegance, and the combination of the two is exceedingly satisfying .. The pot springs up from its small base and its almost circular contour is modified and altered in one or two places in the most subtle way. The whole pot was covered with a glaze which has considerable variation of tone and colour".'

As a young artist and teacher, Scott was engaged in the political transformations of the 1970s. The United Nations declared 1975 to be International Women’s Year, with conferences and celebrations held worldwide, including a broad programme of events in Adelaide, South Australia. As part those activities, Scott participated in an exhibition of women artists held at the Adelaide Festival Centre.

Later that year, Scott took part in a delegation of Australian potters as guests of the People's Republic of China. The party of 10, led by Australian Potter Ivan McMeekin and accompanied by Diplomat Geoffrey Marginson, spent 35 days studying pottery techniques in urban and regional settings. This delegation formed part of cultural exchanges consequent to the opening of diplomatic relations between the two countries in 1972.

Scott held her first major exhibition outside her home state at Solander Gallery, Canberra, Australian Capital Territory. Rowland Richardson, Head, North Adelaide School of Art, reviewed the opening in the Spring 1978 edition of Pottery in Australia. He wrote that ‘The forms are mainly hand built with dry or matt "earth" glazes sprayed on. The sun, usually seen as a negative form, is often surrounded with a lattice of clay depicting the shimmering, radiating heat. A sun which bakes dry the landscape, but is still very much at the centre of it. However, the more recent work has a totemic feel to it. It is stronger, more geometric, and is decorated with a formal engobe pattern. [Joyce Scott] is a thoroughly professional artist, sketching a lot, determinedly independent and unaffected by fashions. I believe she is one of the few ceramic artists who have been able to imbue their work with a uniquely Australian feel.’

'As part of an ongoing relationship with the political left, in the early 1980s Scott donated artwork to exhibition fundraisers of the Australian Labor Party.' A personal letter of appreciation from the then Leader of the Opposition, John Bannon, records her contribution.

Subsequently, '... in 1983, the late John Bannon, then Premier of South Australia, opened an exhibition of Scott’s ceramics at Bonython Art Gallery.' 'The exhibition was reviewed by Stephen Skillitzi in the Spring 1983 edition of S.A. Crafts. Skillitzi, then Lecturer in Charge of Ceramics at the South Australia School of Art, praised the 'intrinsic warmth and richness of clay, amber and black oxides, and white glaze are fused into composites that are bold in their simplicity and yet rich in their delicate detail of applied brushed and incised textural patterns and line and soft torn clay slab additions.’ After surveying a number of individual artworks, Skillitzi concluded ‘These strongly conceived yet delicately executed and cogent statements in stoneware underline Joyce Scott’s gradual refinement and maturation into a ceramic artist with significant vision.’

Wild Grass was the title of Scott’s first drawing exhibition. A review of the exhibition by the prominent art critic Neville Weston in The Advertiser newspaper said ‘Joyce Scott’s [1985 drawing] exhibition at Greenhill Galleries .. suggests that the landscape feel, which has always been a strong feature of her ceramics, is no longer pot bound … it is an exciting exhibition.’ In correspondence to the artist about the exhibits, Australian painter and 'master of contemporary landscape' Geoff Wilson magnanimously observed 'you show the same fascinating ease with your drawings as with your ceramics. I wouldn't dare tackle such complex subjects.' He further commended Scott on the 'rewarding success' of selling all exhibited works.

'During the late 1980s and early 1990s Scott lectured in the School of Art and Design Education at the University of South Australia.' 'She coordinated Units in Sculpture, Clay, Glaze Technology, Visual Research and Core Studies across all years of the Graduate Programme.'

‘In 1986 and ’89 her work gained international recognition, and among her achievements she received two Honourable Mentions in the form of certificates presented for outstanding achievement at [both] the First and Second International Ceramics Contests in Nagoya, [Mino], Japan. Her work has since been acquired by a number of state and international art museums’ said Dr Noris Ioannou. 'Japanese pottery and porcelain is acknowledged as the world’s finest and Scott amplified her international recognition with an Honorable Certificate, Silver Prize at the 1988 International Pottery Exhibition of The Japanese Pottery Association, Tokyo.'

The August 1989 edition of Craft Arts International was fronted by Scott’s work and carried a four-page feature article on her ceramics by Dr Doug Boughton, the then Head of the School of Art and Design Education, South Australian College of Advanced Education. Boughton described ‘Each piece [as] uncompromising in its "earthiness", a feeling created through the glowing warmth of the earth reds, burnt oranges, and yellow ochres which appear to shimmer across the surfaces almost like the illusion of a mirage on a desert landscape. Stain and glaze are used on clay with a sensitivity and authority that would seem to be more the province of a painter than a ceramist. It is not a surprise that Joyce Scott regards the flat areas of her pieces as a "canvas of clay" on which she works her magic with variations of tone and intensity of hue.’ Boughton quoted the artist as saying: "I am endeavouring to produce a series of forms and images influenced and inspired by the Australian landscape. I want to celebrate the vitality of the land, and uncover a different reality. This involves a two-way vision, looking outward, and looking inward at the essence of life.’’’

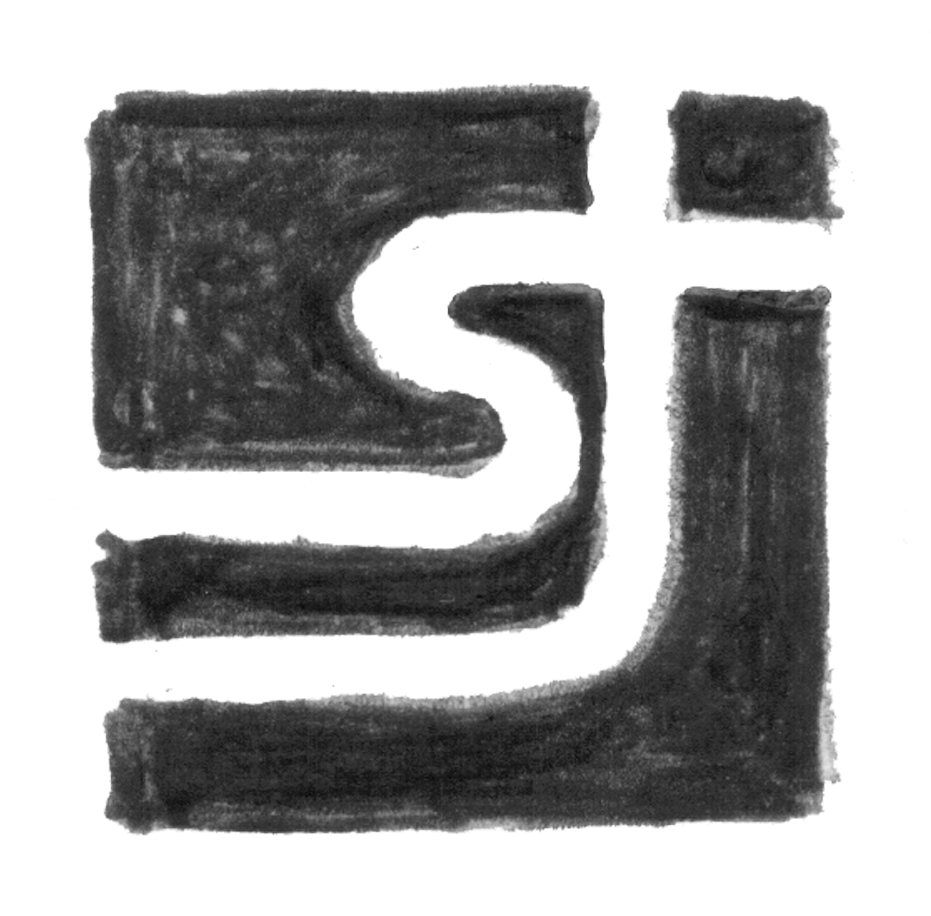
Joyce Ellen Scott's potter's mark

The 1995 edition of Craft Arts International published a second feature article on Scott by historian and freelance writer Dr Noris Ioannou. In this article, entitled Eye of the Sun, Dr Ioannou said ‘Scott‘s work is a joyous celebration of sun, life and the fecundity of the South Australian Landscape. Her large, abstracted, slab-built vessels seem to rise from a primeval base to suggest stylised natural terrain; alternatively, the forms suggest microcosmic views of the placental womb. Whatever the imagery implies, the central idea is that of birth, regeneration, and fertility.’ He continued ‘Underpinning her evocative imagery is the concept of containment, as symbolised by the principal form of her work, the vessel. For Scott, the vessel represents the earth, the timelessness of nature and the heavens. The metaphor of the vessel as the earth also extends to its representation of human life, both individual and collective. Earth, material culture, and human life are therefore interlinked and symbolised through the fired clay vessel. As such, Scott, through her ceramic sculptures, is essentially exploring the universal human condition. Above all, however, it is the balance of this fragile planet — both the life on it, as well as the inner equilibrium which each and every person seeks to achieve - that she especially seeks to symbolise in her new sculptures.’

== Awards ==
1974	First prize	Adelaide University Union Bookshop
1974	First prize	Bathurst Carillion City Festival, NSW
1986	Honorable Mention for outstanding achievement	First International Ceramics Contest, Mino, Japan
1988	Honorable Certificate, Silver Prize and plague	1988 International Pottery Exhibition, The Japanese Pottery Association, Tokyo
1989	Honorable Mention for outstanding achievement	Second International Ceramics Competition, Mino, Japan

== Represented ==
Scott's work is represented in the:

- National Gallery of Australia
- Rockhampton Art Gallery
- Bathurst Regional Art Gallery
- Adelaide College of the Arts and Education
- Artbank, Australia
- Arts Council of Bunbury
- Museum of Contemporary Ceramics, Grottaglia, Italy
- South Australian Studio Potters Collection
- Jupiters Hotel and Casino
- Hyatt Regency, Adelaide
- And private collections in Australia, the United Kingdom, New Zealand, Italy, Japan and the United States.

== Exhibitions ==
=== Independent ===
Between 1974 and 1993, Scott held nine ceramics exhibitions:

- Greenhill Galleries, SA, 1974
- Greenhill Galleries, SA, 1976
- Solander Galleries, ACT, 1978
- Greenhill Galleries, SA, 1980, Opened by Dr Gregor Ramsey, Director, ACAE
- Bonython Gallery, SA, 1983, Opened by the Hon. John Bannon, Premier, SA
- Holdsworth Gallery, NSW, 1986
- Greenhill Galleries, WA, 1987
- Greenhill Galleries, SA, 1988, Opened by Sir Rupert Hamer, KCMG
- Kensington Gallery, SA, 1993, Opened by Patti Warashina, USA Artist

In 1985 she presented Wild Grass, an exhibition of drawing at Greenhill Galleries, SA, opened by Dr John Skull, Dean, SACAE.

=== Group ===
Joyce Scott has exhibited in numerous invitation exhibitions in all Australian States. These include:

- Mitchell Regional Art Gallery, Bathurst, New South Wales, 1974
- International Women’s Year, Festival Theatre, Adelaide, South Australia, 1975
- The International Bendigo Award, Victoria, 1976
- Fringe Festival, Halmaag Gallery, 1976
- Australian Craft, touring Australia and abroad, 1978
- Twelve South Australian Potters, Potters Society, Sydney, New South Wales, 1978
- Ceramics Conference Exhibition, Sydney, New South Wales, 1978
- Modern Masters Caltex Award, Royal Society of Arts, Adelaide, South Australia, 1978
- Festival Craft Exhibition, Queen Victoria Museum and Art Gallery, Tasmania, 1981
- 10th Anniversary Exhibition, Greenhill Galleries, 1982
- National Ceramics Conference Exhibition, Greenhill Galleries, Adelaide, South Australia, 1983
- Darling Downs National Ceramics Award, Queensland, 1984
- Autumn Drift, Museum and Art Gallery of the Northern Territory, 1984
- Kensington Gallery, South Australia, mixed media exhibition, 1990
- Adelaide Festival of Arts, Kensington Gallery, South Australia, 1998
- An Old Salt, Oil painting; Salt of the Earth, SALA Festival and the Royal South Australian Society of Arts, Winter 2015
- The Innocent, Oil painting; Point of View, Royal South Australian Society of Arts Gallery, Spring 2015
- Sounds of Silence, Pencil on cartridge; Monochromatic, Royal South Australian Society of Arts Gallery, Summer 2015/16
- Sheppie on a Persian Rug, Oil painting; Out of the Box, Royal South Australian Society of Arts Gallery, Fringe/Autumn 2016
- Let's Go, Oil painting; Rainy Days, Royal South Australian Society of Arts Gallery, Autumn 2016
- Memories, Oil painting; Captured Moments, SALA Festival and the Royal South Australian Society of Arts, Spring 2016
- Premonition, Oil painting; Caring For Our Planet, 7th Solar Art Prize, Royal South Australian Society of Arts, 2016
- The Young Violinist, Oil painting; Proud To Be 160, RSASA Anniversary Exhibition, Artworks by Significant Past Members, 2016 opened by His Excellency the Honourable Hieu Van Le AC Governor of South Australia
- Adelaide Remembers, Oil painting; Authentic Adelaide, Adelaide Town Hall, RSASA, 2016 opened by The Lady Mayoress Genevieve Theseira-Haese, Adelaide City Council
- Imagine If This Was You, Oil painting; Imagine, RSASA, 2017
- Graduation, Oil painting; Winds of Change, RSASA, 2017
- Gypsy and Sheppie, Oil painting; Wet, Wild & Woolly, RSASA, 2017
- For Ever, Oil painting; New Life, RSASA, 2017
- Turquoise and Gold, Ceramics ; A Family Affair, RSASA, 2017
- Tranquility, Oil on Board; A Walk in the Park, RSASA, Summer 2018

== Publications ==
=== International ===
- The Masters of Modern Ceramics 1986, Faenza, Italy
- La Ceramica Moderna, Italy, 1987
- Heat Wave, ʼ88 International Pottery Exhibition, Tokyo
- 2^{a} Biennale Internazionale Di Ceramica Contemporanae
- Ceramic Landscapes, Crafts Arts International, 1989
- Whirl Wind, 2nd International Ceramics Competition, Mino, Japan, 1989
- Eye of the Sun, Crafts Arts International, 1995

=== Australian ===
- Pottery in Australia:
  - Greenhill Galleries, 1974
  - Festival of Arts Exhibition, 1976
  - Solandar Gallery, 1978
  - Night Eclipse, 1980
  - Daybreak, 1980
  - Festival Craft Exhibition, 1982
  - Bonython Exhibition, 1983
  - Olive Earth, 1987
  - Greenhill Galleries, 1987
  - Capturing the Wonder of Nature's Lifecycle, 1995
- Force Intensified, Australian Crafts, 1977
- Artists and Galleries of Australia and New Zealand, 1979
- Potters' Directory & Information Book, 1981
- Cameo Reflections, S.A. Crafts, 1983
- Clay Statements, Australian Contemporary Ceramics, 1985
- Craft Australia: year book 1984
- Ceramics in South Australia 1836-1986, from Folk to Studio Pottery, 1986
- Adelaide Festival of Arts ʼ88, Art and Australia, 1987
- International Mino Exhibition, Japan, Craft Australia, 1987
- South Australian Ceramic Inglewood Award 1988
- Craft Arts Magazine, Annual Buyers' Guide Supplement 1988-89
- Artfile, 1992
- Kalori, Royal South Australian Society of Arts, 2016, Cover page and feature article
- Members Sketchbook II, Royal South Australian Society of Arts, 2016, Two page survey
- A Visual History: The Royal South Australian Society of Arts, 1856-2016, Volume One
- A Visual History: The Royal South Australian Society of Arts, 1856-2016, Volume Two, Two page entry
