= Laurence Hope (artist) =

Australian artist from Sydney (born 1927)

- Laurence Hope at 34, photographed by James Brian McArdle at Beaumaris on 28 May 1961
- Born: 9 March 1927; Sydney, Australia
- Died: 3 February 2016 (aged 88); London, England
- Occupation: Artist

Laurence Hope (9 March 1927 – 3 February 2016) was an Australian artist from Sydney who is best known for his Lover, Dreamers and Isolates paintings.

== Early years ==
Laurence Hope was raised in an artistic environment, his parents, Norman and Gertrude Hope, were practicing artists who met at Brisbane Technical College in the 1920s. His father ran a successful illustration and printing business and from early age Hope would undertake commercial artistic assignments for the family business.

He had a stable early family life with his parents and older brother Norman, living first in Dee Why and then moving to Seaforth during the depression years. His local primary school in Seaforth brought him into contact with a young Charles Blackman, with whom he was to form a close friendship many years later. Hope later attended East Sydney Technical College and quickly developed a mature style from an early age leading to success in a number of art awards, most notably the national Sun Youth Art Prize in 1940 for the painting Sydney Orchestra.

== Australian years ==
In 1944 at the age of 17 Hope left home and travelled to Brisbane. Penniless, he spent a number of nights sleeping rough before meeting the poet Barrett Reid who took him to stay at his parents, this was the start of a lifelong friendship. A string of temporary jobs followed to help facilitate his art which remained largely concerned with depicting the dispossessed and vulnerable in society.

Intellectually Hope aligned himself with the Barjai Group, a collection of writers and poets led by Barrett Reid, and with members including Barbara Patterson and Charles Osborne. Later, in 1945 along with Pamela Seeman and Laurence Collison, he formed the Miya Studios with the aim of providing exhibition space for young artists with common goals. Laurence Hope exhibited at their annual exhibition during the life of the Studios from 1945 to 1949. During this time he became re-acquainted with Charles Blackman, the two travelled, painted and lived together over a number of years. Blackman credited Hope with helping him adjust to life as an artist during this time.

On a hitchhiking trip with Barrett Reid in 1947 he was introduced to John and Sunday Reed who were to become lifelong supporters of his art. Though them Hope became acquainted with many of the influential avant-garde in the Melbourne art scene such as Joy Hester, Sidney Nolan, Arthur Boyd and John Perceval.

In the late 40s and early 50s Hope travelled widely around Queensland working in a range of odd jobs and painting vivid jungle, urban and figurative images. During this time he had a number of successful solo exhibitions in Brisbane at the Moreton Gallery and Johnstone Gallery.

In 1953, he moved to Melbourne where he met Georges Mora and Mirka Mora and was adopted into their family eventually becoming godfather to their second son William Mora. He appeared in a number of exhibitions at Mirka's studio, including a solo show in 1954. He also helped re-establish the Contemporary Arts Society. During his time in Melbourne he met with a significant network of artists who matched his own ideas of true originality born of imagination, including Danila Vassilieff, John Percival, Arthur Boyd, Jean Langley and Robert Dickerson. In 1962 Laurence collaborated with Perceval and Mirka Mora on murals Aspendale Fricassee and Balzac Fricassee by Ross Crothall and Mike Brown of the Annandale Imitation Realists'. By this time he had moved to painting mainly with oil on board, rather than his earlier work which tended to be watercolour and gouache on paper. This coincided with him increasingly focusing his energies on exploring the isolation and loneliness of the human condition, a subject he had explored since his teenage years and has continued to return to throughout his life. His 'collective paintings of Lovers, Dreamers and Isolates depict the mood and temperament of individuals concealing more significant emotions'.

== Later years ==
Hope moved to England in 1963, after travelling widely across Europe. There he met up with expatriate friends – Charles Blackman, Barbara Blackman, John Perceval, Arthur Boyd and Barry Humphries and exhibited at Clytie Jessop's Kings Road Gallery. During that time he even turned to acting, appearing in the Philippe Mora film Trouble in Melopolis alongside Germaine Greer. For the next five years Hope continued to travel widely across Europe, Asia and the Americas. These trips influenced his painting which became more 'dramatic, vivid and colourful', he began to paint on a larger scale 'incorporating monuments, temples and even mythological creatures' from Cambodia and Mayan civilisations.

During this time he continued to have a number of major exhibitions including a retrospective at the Holdsworth Galleries in Sydney and the Commonwealth Art Gallery in London. In 1977 his exhibition Opal the Rainbow Gem at the ICA in London featured Cibachrome prints, and acrylic paintings made from them, of the gemstone taken at magnifications of up to x5400 through a microscope.

In 1972 he had a son, Danton, by his partner Marna Shapiro. This led to him painting an extensive collection of baby fantasy paintings reflecting this new period in his life. In 1989 he married Wendy Shaw and his painting became more personalised and intimate.

In 2002 Hope had a major retrospective exhibition at the Heide Museum of Modern Art in Melbourne touring to the Sir Hermann Black Gallery at the University of Sydney and the Customs House Gallery, University of Queensland.

Laurence Hope is represented in a large number of public and private collections, including the National Gallery of Australia, National Gallery of Victoria, Art Gallery of South Australia, Queensland Art Gallery, Heide Museum of Modern Art and University Art Museum – University of Queensland.

Hope died in London on 3 February 2016.
