= Antipodeans =

Australian modern art group

- Poster for the Antipodeans Exhibition
- Notable work: The Antipodean Manifesto
- Style: Modern
- Movement: Figurativism

The Antipodeans were a collective of Australian modern artists, known for their advocacy of figurative art and opposition to abstract expressionism. The group, which included seven painters from Melbourne and art historian Bernard Smith, was active in the late 1950s. Despite staging only a single exhibition in Melbourne in August 1959, the Antipodeans gained international recognition.

The group's members were Charles Blackman, Arthur Boyd, David Boyd, John Brack, Robert Dickerson, John Perceval, and Clifton Pugh, with Smith compiling. The group's stance was controversial at the time, with some viewing it as a conservative reaction against international art trends. Despite this, the Antipodeans' influence extended beyond Australia, with their works included in a 1961 exhibition at the Whitechapel Gallery in London.

== History ==
The Antipodeans group consisted of seven modern Melbourne painters and the art historian Bernard Smith, who compiled The Antipodean Manifesto in 1959, a declaration fashioned from the artists' comments as a catalogue essay to accompany their exhibit. Albert Tucker, not associated with the group, had begun exhibiting a series in a similar figurative style titled Antipodean Head in Europe in 1957. Member John Perceval exhibited a ceramic sculpture Antipodean Angel, a laughing figure standing on its hands, at Terry Clune Gallery in Sydney in May 1959.

The artists were Charles Blackman, Arthur Boyd, David Boyd, John Brack, Robert Dickerson, John Perceval and Clifton Pugh. They were all Melbourne-based, save Dickerson, who was from Sydney. In 1959 none were direct members of the Heide Circle that had maintained its importance with the Melbourne Branch of the Contemporary Art Society (CAS) since the early 1940s, though Sunday and John Reed championed the group. Three were Boyd family members and all were fraternal painters of some stature working within their maintained styles of realistic imagery. Notably, though Perceval showed there in 1958, they did not exhibit in the CAS's own gallery (directed by Reed from 1958 as the Museum of Modern Art Australia), as the Society opposed the show, but chose instead to use the premises of the rival Victorian Artists' Society, long a bastion for cultural conservatism in Melbourne.

The Age, in its 'News of the Day' greeted their emergence;

For the layman mystified by most modern art, the exhibition by a newly formed group called the Antipodeans, which opens at the Victorian Artists' Society rooms tomorrow, holds out real promise. The Antipodeans a group of seven Melbourne artists and one University Fine Arts lecturer have joined forces in a protest against the work of many of their contemporaries. The artists in the group are [joined by] the lecturer Mr. Bernard Smith (who is also their chairman) [ . . . ] To Illustrate the group's Idea, Mr. Smith showed us a copy of the group's manifesto, a strongly worded two page document which, we feel, is bound to provoke some argument somewhere."

The article quotes Smith, who opened the show on Tuesday 4 August 1959, explaining their raison d'être as a stand against "abstract and non-figurative art, which is dazzling young artists everywhere," and that they had chosen the name Antipodeans because it "signifies where we live, but avoids any national overtones in the word Australian. It also links us with the European tradition."

== The Antipodean Manifesto ==
The Antipodean Manifesto was a reaction to the considerable public success of the museum exhibition, The New American Painting, an authoritative survey of abstract expressionism organised by New York's Museum of Modern Art, which was touring Europe over 1958–59. The Australian painters feared that American abstraction was becoming the new orthodoxy, and that intolerance towards the modernist figurative art they practiced was increasing internationally.

Their manifesto therefore warned against the uncritical adoption by artists of overseas fashion, American abstract expressionism in particular. The manifesto took its central stand on the cardinal importance of the image:

[T]he image, the recognisable shape, the meaningful symbol, is the basic unit of [the artist's] language... It is born of past experience and refers back to past experience — and it communicates. It communicates because it has the capacity to refer to experiences that the artist shares with his audience.

== Critical reception ==
The manifesto was seen by some local artists and critics at the time as a statement in favour of conservatism and reaction, and as a call to isolate Australia from international art. Their case was not helped by the fact that they were all enjoying some commercial success, as against their immediate rivals (the local abstractionists Roger Kemp, Leonard French, Inge King and George Johnson).

The Age critic Arnold Shore in his contemporaneous review framed the group as "anti-abstract painters who believe that art should express ideas" and condemned their "ideas" as "obscure," "comic-strip" and "badly painted," singling out Blackman as the only one "to endow his ideas with a sense of existence and their presentation with subtleties of art form," and considered Perceval's ceramics superior to his paintings of Williamstown as a "perpetual regatta of colour." He dismissed Arthur Boyd's Bride series as "quaint," David Boyd's work as "grotesque cartooning," John Brack's as "illustrative distortion," Dickerson's as reaching "tragic depths," and concluded that Pugh had lost himself in painting his Rape of Europa.

== Legacy ==
Nevertheless, with the assistance of British museum director Kenneth Clark, works by group members were included in a 1961 exhibition entitled Recent Australian Painting at the Whitechapel Gallery in London (alongside that of Jon Molvig, Albert Tucker, Sidney Nolan, Fred Williams and others). They felt vindicated by their inclusion in this exhibition, which established that contemporary Australian painting had a well-founded national identity. In the months after the Antipodeans exhibition, Boyd, Perceval and Blackman all moved to London, and established successful exhibiting careers on the European scene.

The Antipodeans were a Melbourne movement. In 1961, a group calling themselves the Sydney 9 — which included the Australian abstract artists Hector Gilliland, Carl Plate, Leonard Hessing, Stan Rapotec, John Olsen, Robert Klippel, Clement Meadmore and Bill Rose — held an exhibition of paintings and sculpture to counter the Antipodeans group. The group also recruited a young critic, Robert Hughes, to oppose the stance of Bernard Smith.

In 1999, the now internationally known art movement Stuckism was founded, which among other preceding art movements draws on the principles of The Antipodeans.

== See also ==
- Sydney Charm School
- Paris School
- New York School
- Art of Australia
- Stuckism in Australia
