= Andrew Blackman =

Australian actor

- Born: 2 August 1965 (age 60); Brisbane, Queensland, Australia
- Occupations: Actor; theatre director and producer; dramatic performer interpreter
- Years active: 1987-present
- Known for: A Country Practice

Andrew Blackman (born 2 August 1965) is an Australian born actor, producer, and director he is best known for his role as Dr. Harry Morrison in TV series A Country Practice and briefly in Neighbours, as well as founding the Complete Works Theatre Company (CWTC) in Melbourne in 1999.

== Early life and education ==
Blackman was born in Brisbane, Queensland and began acting at the age of seven in the play Dark of the Moon, staged by the Queensland Theatre Company.

He attended Dakabin State High School, where he performed in a high school musical production called Teen. He went on to study at Kelvin Grove College of Advance Education where he received an Associate Diploma in Performing Arts, received the Elizabeth Bequest Scholarship with TN! Theatre Company, and performed two seasons of Shakespeare with the Grin & Tonic Theatre Troupe. He was then accepted into Sydney's National Institute of Dramatic Art (NIDA) where he further honed his craft. He graduated in 1990.

== Career ==
Blackman played the role of Dr. Harry Morrison in long-running medical series A Country Practice from 1991 to 1994, and Don Fry in multi-award winning children's series Mortified from 2006 to 2007. He also appeared in the Logie Award-winning show Utopia and the Stan original series Bloom.

Other television credits include police drama Blue Heelers, legal series Halifax f.p., long-running soap opera Neighbours, drama House Husbands, crime series Underbelly: Squizzy, Law of the Land, The Doctor Blake Mysteries, Winners & Losers, Satisfaction and miniseries Barracuda. He also appeared in the 1987 thriller film Frenchman’s Farm.

Blackman founded the Complete Works Theatre Company (CWTC) in Melbourne in 1999, where he holds the role of Artistic Director. He has directed and produced numerous stage productions, including Medea, A Man for All Seasons, Romeo and Juliet, A Midsummer Night’s Dream, Macbeth, Cosi, Summer of the Seventeenth Doll, Othello, Oedipus Rex, Richard III, and Hamlet. He has also starred in a number of Australian theatre companies' productions, including Macbeth, The Taming of the Shrew, A Midsummer Night's Dream, Othello and The Woman in Black.

== Personal life ==
Blackman is married to Caroline Williams, who is also his business partner. They share children and live in the inner Melbourne suburb of Fitzroy.

== Filmography ==
=== Film ===
Year	Title	Role	Notes
1987	Frenchman's Farm	John Mainsbridge	Feature film
1996	The Birds Do a Magnificent Tune		Short film
1998	Hurrah	Emerson	Feature film
2015	Foetal Position	James	Short film
2025	Ostrich	Joseph	Short film

=== Television ===
Year	Title	Role	Notes
1991–1994	A Country Practice	Dr Harry Morrison	266 episodes
1995	The Feds: Suspect	Ponytail	TV movie
1996	Halifax f.p.	Stephen Audrey	1 episode
1996; 1999	Law of the Land	James Forster	3 episodes
1996–2004	Blue Heelers	Joel Willis / Lloyd Ryan / Warwick Janssen	4 episodes
1997	State Coroner	David Hubbard	2 episodes
1998–1999	Neighbours	Mike Healey	32 episodes
2001	Crash Zone	Phil Godwen	1 episode
2001	Dogwoman: The Legend of Dogwoman	Mac (Paul) McDonald	TV movie
2001	Stingers	Lewis Craig	1 episode
2003	Legacy of the Silver Shadow	Atomic Clock	1 episode
2006–2007	Mortified	Don Fry	26 episodes
2008	Valentine's Day	Tony Cosgrove	TV movie
2008	Rush	Geoffrey	1 episode
2008	Satisfaction	Tom	1 episode
2009	The Saddle Club	Vince Bernouli	1 episode
2009	City Homicide	Scott Cousins	1 episode
2012	Miss Fisher's Murder Mysteries	Roderick Gaskin	1 episode
2012	Winners & Losers	Tom Shields	5 episodes
2013	Wentworth	Oliver Donaldson	1 episode
2013	Underbelly	Judge Woinarski	4 episodes
2013	The Doctor Blake Mysteries	Miles McLaren	1 episode
2014	House Husbands	Hugh	4 episodes
2016	Barracuda	Mr Taylor	Miniseries, 3 episodes
2017	Newton's Law	Lars Svensson	Miniseries, 1 episode
2018	Superwog	Foster Dad	1 episode
2019	Utopia	Bruce Dennis QC	1 episode
2020	Bloom	Martin	3 episodes
2023	Warnie	Malcolm Speed	Miniseries, 2 episodes

== Stage ==
=== As actor ===
Year	Title	Role	Notes
1972	Dark of the Moon		Queensland Theatre Company
1987	Desdemona and Othello		Sydney Opera House with Grin and Tonic
1993	A Christmas Carol		Concert Hall, Brisbane with Orford Productions International
	Vulture Culture		TN! Theatre Company
	Raise the Titanic		TN! Theatre Company
	Ship of Fools		TN! Theatre Company
	As You Like It	Orlando	Grin and Tonic Theatre Troupe
	The Woman in Black	Kipps	Victorian Arts Council
1996	Kid Stakes	Roo	Playhouse, Melbourne, Gold Coast Arts Centre with MTC
	Icarus	Icarus	Tasmanian New Music Festival
	A Midsummer Night’s Dream	Theseus	Grin and Tonic Theatre Troupe
	Macbeth	Macduff	Grin and Tonic Theatre Troupe
1996	Over the Top With Jim	Jackie / Brother Basher	Queensland Conservatorium with Queensland Performing Arts Trust for Brisbane Festival & tour
1996	Witches I and II		Woolloongabba with Grin and Tonic
1997	Big Hair in America	Jerry / Coach	Universal Theatre, Melbourne for MICF
1997; 1998	The Taming of the Shrew	Lucentio	Royal Botanic Gardens Melbourne with Australian Shakespeare Company, Adelaide Festival
2001	The Treadmill	Willowhite / Aspinal / Rumkovsky	Melbourne Athenaeum, Carlton Courthouse
2002	The Aunt's Story	Frank / Wetherby	Playhouse, Melbourne, Belvoir Street Theatre, Sydney, Playhouse, Brisbane with MTC
	Extinction		CWTC
	Much Ado About Nothing		CWTC
	The Longest Memory	Mr. Whitechapel	CWTC
2007	Shadow Passion	Robert Harrow	Chapel Off Chapel, Melbourne
2007	A Midsummer Night's Dream	Oberon	Theatre Works, Melbourne with The Preferred Play Company & CWTC
2011; 2014–2015	Walking with Dinosaurs − The Arena Spectacular	Huxley	North America / Australia / New Zealand tours with Creature Entertainment
	The Women of Troy	Poseidon / Menelaus	CWTC
	You Are the Blood	David Boden	Spinning Plates
2022	The Heartbreak Choir	Standby Peter	Southbank Theatre, Melbourne & Online with MTC
2023	Death of a Salesman	Uncle Ben	The Bowery, St Albans, The Drum, Dandenong, Chapel Off Chapel, Melbourne, Melbourne suburban tour, VIC & NSW regional tour
2025	And Then There Were None	Standby	CWTC

=== As director / adaptor ===
Year	Title	Role	Notes
2005	Off the Canvas	Writer / Director	Regional Arts Victoria
2007	Macbeth	Director	Melbourne with CWTC
2007–2010	A Man for All Seasons	Director	University of Melbourne, Westside Performing Arts Centre, Mooroopna, The Capital, Bendigo, Mildura Arts Centre, Drum Theatre, Dandenong with CWTC
2008	Othello	Adaptor	Victorian regional tour with CWTC
2008	All the World's a Stage	Adaptor	Victorian regional tour with CWTC
2008	Richard III	Director / Producer	CWTC
2008; 2012; 2020	Romeo and Juliet	Director	CWTC
	Cubbies Theatre Project	Director / Coordinator	Men of Steel
2009–2011	Poetry Alive!	Writer / Director	The Song Room
2011	Monkey Fights the Water Dragon	Producer / Director	Knox Festival with CWTC
2012; 2020	Macbeth	Director	CWTC
2012	Phat Poetry	Director	CWTC
2012	The Crucible	Director	CWTC
2013	Cosi	Director	CWTC / QUT
2013	Monkey – The Journey to the West	Co-writer	Arts Centre Melbourne
2013; 2014	Whores and Weeping Women	Director / Dramaturge	The Butterfly Club, Melbourne, Downstairs at the Maj, Perth with CWTC
2013; 2016	Summer of the Seventeenth Doll	Director	CWTC
2015–2016	Medea	Director	University of Melbourne with CWTC
2016	Encountering Conflict	Director	Tour with CWTC
2019	The Women of Troy	Director	CWTC
2022–2023	The Crucible / The Dressmaker	Director	CWTC
	Hamlet	Director / Producer	CWTC
	Oedipus Rex	Director / Producer	CWTC
	Without So Much as Knocking	Director / Producer	CWTC
	Federation Express	Director / Producer	CWTC
	The Word Superb	Director / Producer	CWTC
	A Midsummer Night’s Dream		CWTC

== Awards ==
Year	Work	Award	Category	Result
2003	Love Letters from a War	AFI Awards	Open Craft Award: Non-Feature Film	Nominated
2004	Love Letters from a War	New York Festival	International TV Programming Silver World Medal: Docudrama	Won
2019	Utopia Season 4	AACTA Awards	Best Comedy Program	Nominated
