= Vitaly Gzell =

Russian-Australian architect

Vitaly de Gzell (1908-1977) was a Russian-Australian architect, who practised in Queensland in the modernist tradition.

== Early life ==
Vitaly de Gzell was born on 21 December 1908 in Harbin, China to Russian parents, Alexander Gzell and his wife. He was their only child. They emigrated to Australia in 1925 and Vitaly became an Australian citizen in 1935. Alexander Gzell was a furniture maker after emigrating to Australia.

Gzell completed his education in Brisbane and then proceeded to undertake a Diploma in Architecture from the Brisbane Central Technical College, graduating in 1933.

== Career ==
Gzell began work as a draughtsman with Godfrey A. Blackburne after his graduation. He was not yet a British citizen. Gzell was made a partner in 1934 with the firm going by the name Blackburne & Gzell architects. Each architect served in the military during World War II.

They dissolved their partnership in 1953 and Gzell operated his own architectural firm from 1953-1974. He was also a keen furniture maker who displayed his works in the homes he designed.

== War Service ==
He served in the Australian Army during World War II, demobilising with the rank of Major.

== Notable designs ==
Work as Blackburne & Gzell

- Dunk Island Tourist Resort (1935)
- Schureck home, Eblin Drive, Hamilton (1936)
- 54 Highland Terrace, St Lucia (1936)
- Bellevue Court, Clayfield (1937)
- Mathers House, Holland Park (1937)
- Dorchester Inn, Spring Hill (1938)
- Remodelling of Christie's Cafe, 217-219 Queen Street, Brisbane (c.1938) - it features Gzell's gazelle motif.
- Read Press Building, Fortitude Valley (1939)
- Hinda aka Rialto Lodge, Coorparoo (1940)
- Estia Court, Highgate Hill (1940)
- Alexia House, Spring Hill (1940)
- Gzell's home, 25 Aston Street, Toowong (1946–47)
- Chester Estate No. 2 at Mt Gravatt (10 houses) (1948)

Work as sole architect

- 11 Tarcoola Street, St Lucia (1957)
- 7 Herbert Street, Toowong (1957)
- The Mawby Residence, Langside Road, Hamilton (1958)
- ‘Lumeah’, Bina Avenue, Indooroopilly (1959)
- 421 Brookfield Road, Kenmore Hills (1965)
- Twelfth Night Theatre, Bowen Hills (1969)
- 12 Burgess Street, Kings Beach

== Later life ==
In his later years Gzell was well known for hosting art exhibitions and concerts in his home, Usonia (now demolished). This home had been designed for presentation to prospective clients.

== Awards and memberships ==
- President, Twelfth Night Theatre
- Founding member, Brisbane Symphony Orchestra
- Fellow of the Royal Australian Institute of Architects, 1961

== Personal life ==
Gzell married Lorna Martin in 1936. He died on 17 April 1977. They had three children, Barbara, Ian and Julie.

== Legacy ==
Correspondence relating to his architectural work is located in the University of Queensland Fryer Library.
