= Caroline Barker (artist) =

Australian artist

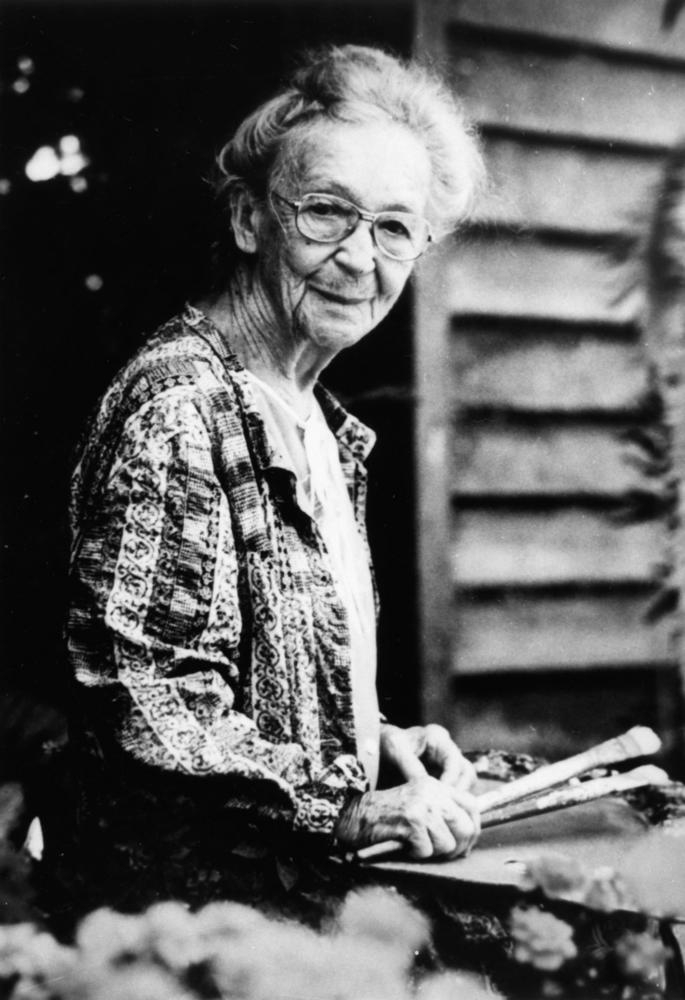
Caroline Barker seated holding paintbrushes, circa 1980

Caroline Barker MBE (1894–1988) was an Australian artist. She is best known for her portraits and still life. The Museum of Brisbane (formerly Brisbane's Civic Art Gallery) holds a large collection of her works.

== Early life ==
Caroline Barker was born on 8 September 1894 in Ascot Vale, Melbourne, Victoria, Australia.

She commenced her art studies at the art school at the Melbourne Art Gallery (now the National Gallery of Victoria) where she studied painting with Bernard Hall and drawing with Frederick McCubbin. There she was awarded second prize for her monochrome painting in 1917, which provided her with a year's free tuition, enabling her to complete her studies in 1919.

Due to her father's ill-health, the family relocated to Brisbane in Queensland in 1920. From 1921 to 1922, Barker became an art teacher at the Ipswich Girls Grammar School, saving her money in order to continue her studies in England.

She continued her studies at the Royal Academy of Arts in Piccadilly, London under Frederick Cayley Robinson and Charles Sims, where she also studied anatomy and the chemistry of painting, and then at the Byam Shaw School of Art under Vicat Cole. During this period her works were added to the collections of the Royal Academy, the Walker Art Gallery in Liverpool, the Paris Salon and the Byam Shaw.

== Artist career ==
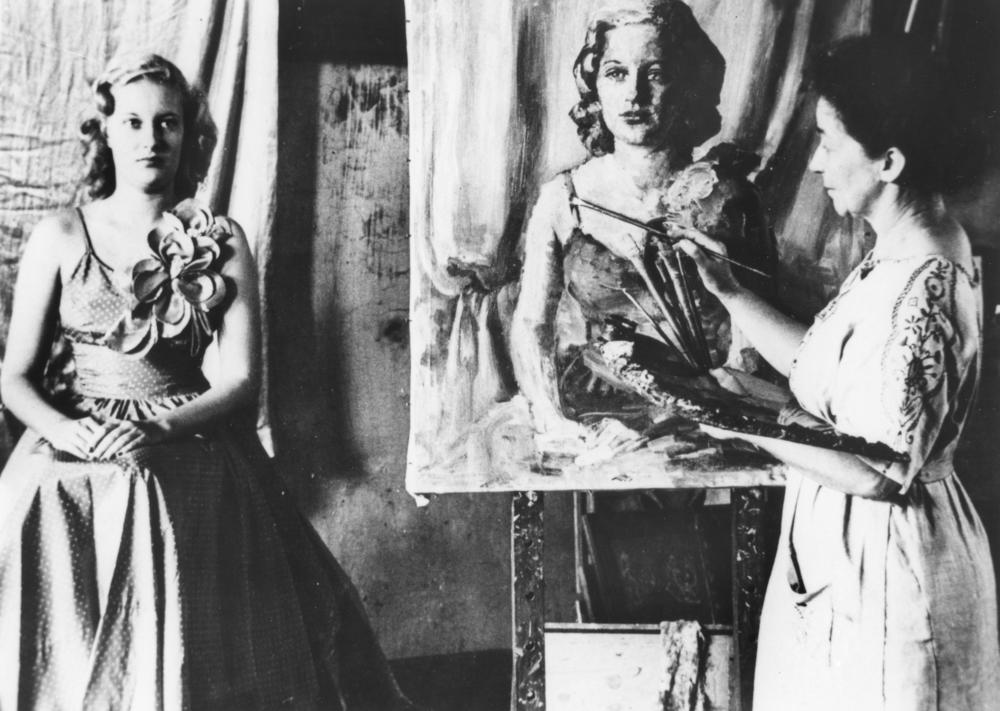
Portrait of Rhonda Kelly by artist Caroline Barker, 1942

Barker returned to Brisbane in November 1926. Initially she worked in the studios of Vida Lahey and Daphne Mayo before establishing her own studio in George Street.

In 1928, Barker painted a portrait of Lord Mayor of Brisbane William Jolly in his mayoral robes and exhibited it at the Royal Queensland Art Society (RQAS). Charles Herbert Gough was so impressed by the work that he initiated a public subscription to purchase the portrait as a gift for the mayor from the citizens of Brisbane. As Jolly was a popular mayor, the public were generous in their donations and the portrait was presented to the mayor in December 1928.

Barker joined the RQAS that year and mainly exhibited there from 1928-1987. She served on the committee almost continuously from 1928 -1973 and was Vice-President for many years. She was made a Life Member in 1964.

Two of her works were used by The Queenslander newspaper for their colour covers, one of poinsettias in 1930 and another of gerberas and bougainvillea in 1931.

Barker taught art at a number of schools including Somerville House (1935-1946), Loreto College Coorparoo, Clayfield College, and St Margaret's Anglican Girls' School and at her own home. Her students include many notable artists including:

- Margaret Cilento
- Betty Churcher (née Cameron)
- Dorothy Coleman
- Lola McCausland
- Margaret Olley
- John Rigby
- Hugh Sawrey
- Gordon Shepherdson

== Later life ==
Barker died on 23 July 1988 at South Brisbane.

== Awards ==
- Member of the Order of the British Empire for services to art, 30 December 1978

== Gallery ==
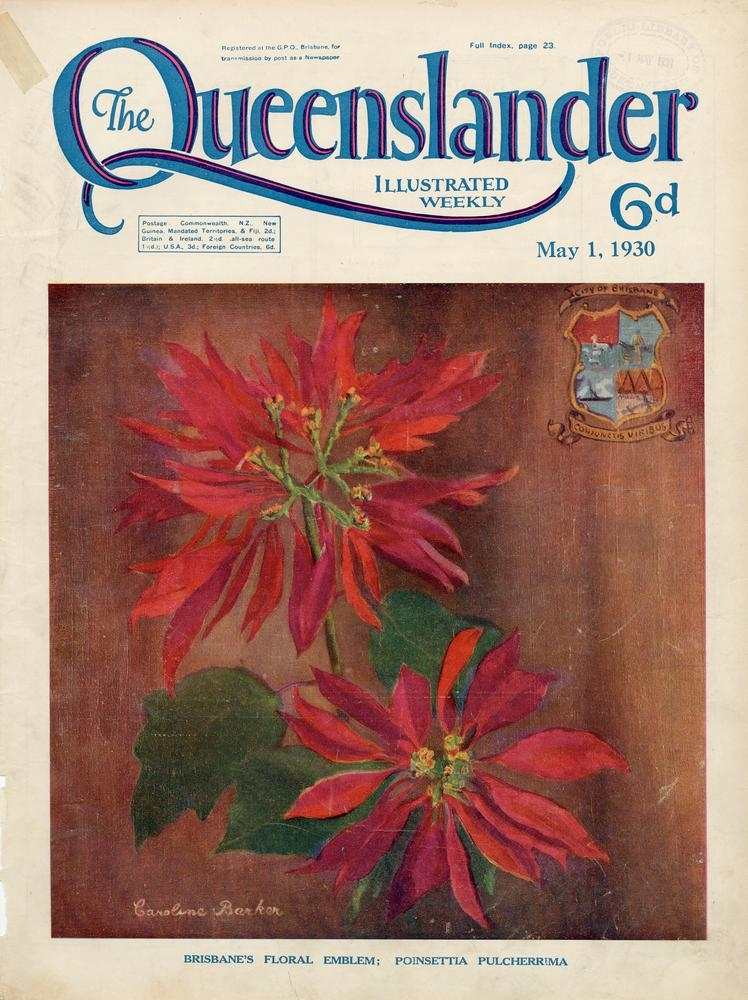
Illustrated front cover from The Queenslander 1 May 1930

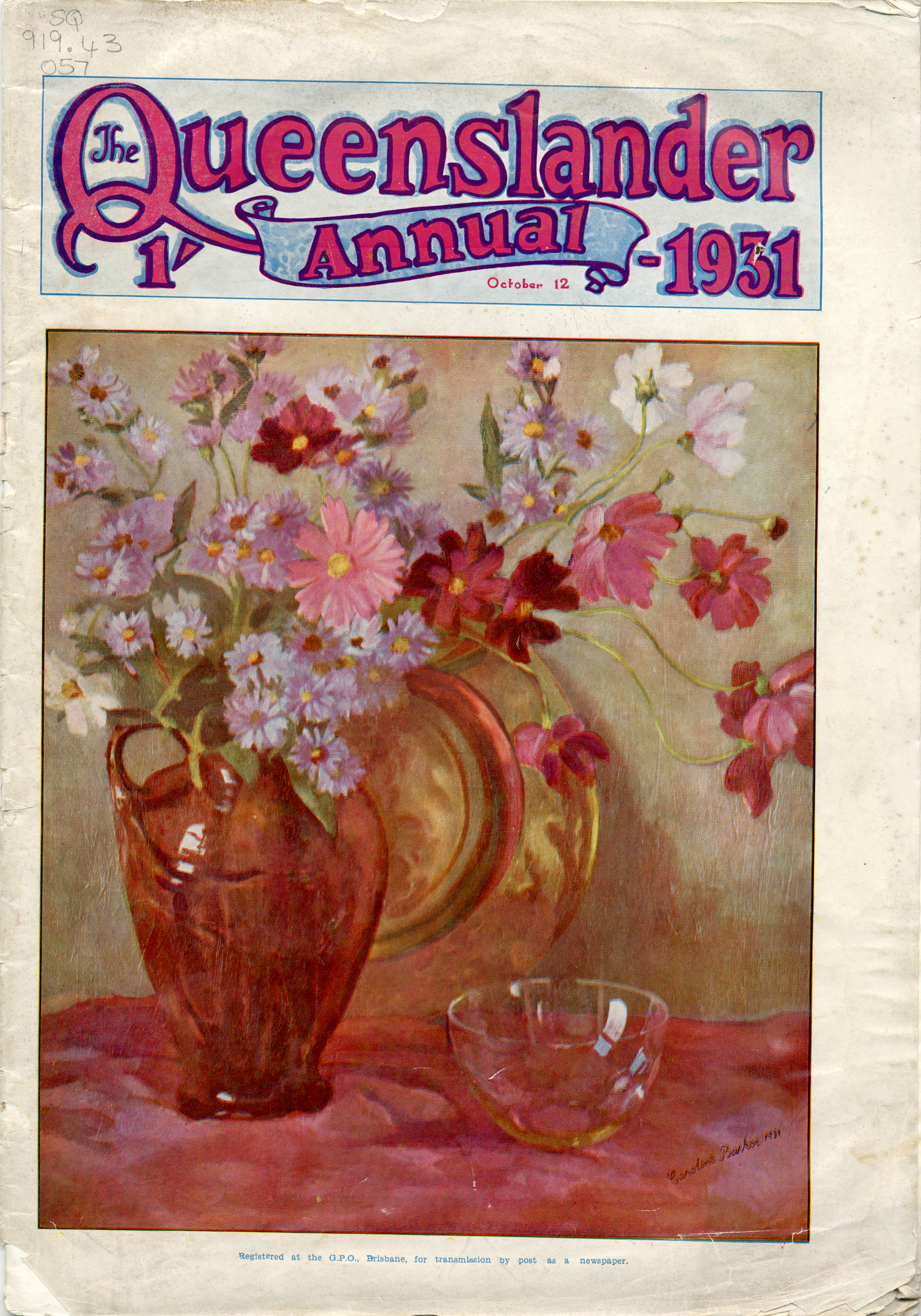
Illustrated front cover from The Queenslander annual October 12, 1931
