= Jon Molvig =

Australian painter

Helge Jon Molvig (May 27, 1923 – May 15, 1970) was an Australian artist, considered a major developer of 20th century Australian expressionism. He was born in the Newcastle, New South Wales suburb of Merewether.

== Career, influence and reception ==
Portraits of Molvig by artist John Rigby hung as part of the Archibald Prize in 1953 and 1959, and Molvig himself won the Archibald in 1966 with a portrait of painter Charles Blackman. He won other prizes including the 1955 and 1956 Lismore Prize, 1961 Transfield Prize (for "City Industrial"), 1963 Perth Prize ("The Family"), 1965 David Jones Prize ("Underarm Still Life"), 1966 Corio Prize ("The Publican"), and 1969 Gold Coast Prize ("Tree of Man X").

During the late fifties and early sixties, Molvig held weekly, informal life drawing classes that became central to the Brisbane art scene at the time. He mentored emerging artists such as John Aland, Andrew Sibley, Gordon Shepherdson, Mervyn Moriarty, Joy Roggenkamp, Hugh Sawrey and many others. Otte van Gilst became Molvig's student in 1958 and moved in with him in January 1960. They married in August of 1963.

Molvig was an accomplished portrait painter, painting fellow artists Charles Blackman, John Rigby, Joy Roggenkamp, Russell Drysdale and Barry Humphries as well as many privately commissioned portraits including of Paul Beadle, Sir Charles Moses, Sir Percy Spender, Clem Jones and Dr. Scougall. His self-portrait is part of the Queensland Art Gallery collection.

Molvig's art was celebrated at Queensland Art Gallery from September 2019 to February 2020 in a major retrospective called Maverick. The opening featured a speech by van Gilst and attended by Molvig's family.

== Central Australian imagery and symbolism ==
Molvig became renowned in 1958-1959, when he painted his "Centralian" series after traveling through central Australia. The series incorporating Australian Aboriginal symbolism in his own interpretation of the Australian landscape. Later, his "Pale Nudes" series (1964) again showed the influence Australian Aboriginal art had on Molvig, and this symbolism was further distilled in the "Tree of Man" series (1968), which was painted when he was seriously ill and perhaps considering his own mortality.

Molvig's work was concerned with humanity and its follies, and he invented symbols and a particular "style" to suit the subject he was painting. This is very evident in his "Eden Industrial" series from 1962, images of Adam and Eve in an industrialized Garden of Eden, with heavily textured surfaces achieved by burning layers of paint with a blowtorch.

Molvig died in Princess Alexandra Hospital, South Brisbane, Queensland after an unsuccessful kidney transplant.

Awards
Preceded by Clifton Pugh	Archibald Prize; 1966 for Charles Blackman	Succeeded by Judy Cassab
