= Australian Stockman's Hall of Fame =

Coordinates: 23.4441°S 144.2747°E

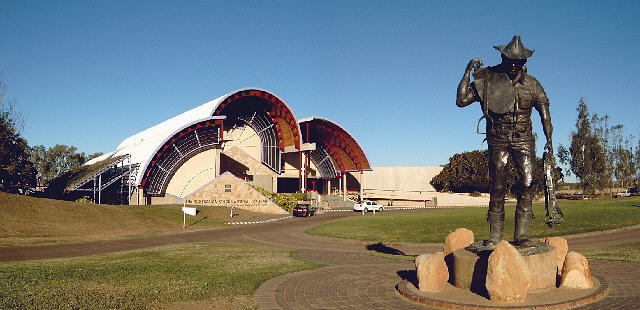
- Australian Stockman's Hall of Fame behind the bronze statue of a stockman called The Ringer
- Established: 29 April 1988
- Location: Longreach, Queensland, Australia
- Type: Hall of fame
- Founder: Hugh Sawrey
- Website: www.outbackheritage.com.au

The Australian Stockman's Hall of Fame is a museum located in Longreach, Queensland, Australia, which pays tribute to pioneers of the Australian outback. The centre is also dedicated to Australian stockmen who have shown bravery and courage.

The founder of the Hall of Fame was artist Hugh Sawrey, a well-known painter and former stockman, who had the name registered in 1974, put up the initial funding, and enlisted supporters. His vision was to create a memorial to the explorers, overlanders, pioneers and settlers of outback Australia. This dream was shared by other outstanding Australians, including the legendary R. M. Williams.

Longreach was chosen as the location because of its historical role as a stock route junction and because of its current transport links. The original information centre, a sandstone cottage built by R. M. Williams, complete with hand adzed timber and black marble floors, was restored to its original character and now houses the Hall of Fame's growing library collection.

The structure was designed by Sydney architect Feiko Bouman and provides 2,500 square metres (27,000 sq ft) of usable floor space.

== History ==
In 1980, an architectural design competition was announced by the Royal Australian Institute of Architects. Construction began in July 1985. The Australian Stockman's Hall of Fame was opened by Queen Elizabeth II, Queen of Australia on 29 April 1988.

In 2009, as part of the Q150 celebrations, the Australian Stockman's Hall of Fame was announced as one of the Q150 Icons of Queensland for its role as a "location".

In 2021, the museum reopened after a three-year makeover that cost $15 million. The museum now features an interactive, choose-your-own-adventure-style experience using headsets and smart devices.

== Displays ==
Gold medals once belonging to legendary sheep shearer Jackie Howe are on display.

A restored Beechcraft Queen Air plane hangs from the ceiling in a display about the Royal Flying Doctor Service.

== See also ==
- List of museums in Queensland
- List of halls and walks of fame
