= Robert Dickerson =

Australian artist (1924–2015)

Robert Dickerson AO
- Born: Robert Henry Dickerson; 30 March 1924; Hurstville, New South Wales, Australia
- Died: 18 October 2015 (aged 91); Nowra, New South Wales, Australia
- Style: Chiaroscuro figurativism
- Movement: Antipodeans

Robert Henry Dickerson AO (30 March 1924 – 18 October 2015) was an Australian figurative painter and former member of the Antipodeans group of artists. Dickerson is one of Australia's most recognised figurative artists and one of a generation of influential artists who include Ray Crooke, Charles Blackman, Laurence Hope, Margaret Olley and Inge King.

== Professional artist ==
Dickerson was a self-taught artist who refused to go to art school. His art has been described as angular and high contrast chiaroscuro and executed in a range of materials including paint, pastels, charcoals and other graphic media.

The inspiration for his art came from everyday life and he drew on the themes of loneliness, vulnerability and isolation. Lone characters with long noses and whimsical, often averted eyes featured heavily of his work. He said it is "the same style I've always used", and did not intend to change it.

In November 1955, art patron John Reed published an article in Ern Malley's Journal (Vol 2) which described Dickerson's work as containing "a new sense of beauty, a new truth". But his break as a professional artist came in 1954 when the National Gallery of Victoria purchased his work Man Asleep On The Steps. In 1959 he joined Charles Blackman, David Boyd, John Brack, Bernard Smith, Arthur Boyd and Clifton Pugh to form the Antipodeans—a group of figurative artists making a statement opposing abstractionism in their day. According to the former deputy director of the National Gallery of Victoria, Frances Lindsay, members of this group continue to be 'productive and innovative after many decades of practice.

== Early life ==
Robert Dickerson was born in 1924 and grew up in Sydney during the 1930s Depression era. By the time he was 14 he was working in a factory while he trained as a boxer. He toured for four years with the Jimmy Sharman Boxing Troupe. "Boxing was purely about money. I was earning 16 shillings (A$1.60) working a 44-hour week and could make two to five pounds (A$4 to A$10) if I won a fight. Minutes in the ring seemed like years, but you cope with what you have to and we needed the money—badly."

Dickerson took up drawing at the age of five, mainly aeroplanes and warships. Later the people in streetscapes became his subject matter. He joined the Royal Australian Air Force as a guard and continued to sketch in his spare time. Inspired by Somerset Maugham's novel The Moon and Sixpence he spent the time painting island children using tent canvas and camouflage paint.

Back in Australia he resumed a life of poverty. By the age of 30, he was married with three small children. He shovelled coal to provide for the family, painting at weekends. Later the family lived in a caravan. He continued to find time to paint and, by the end of the 1950s, his work was being noticed.

He turned professional at 35 when he won £100 (equivalent to £2,094 in 2025) in the 1957 Australian Women's Weekly fridge decorating competition. A small fortune then, the prize allowed him to buy more art materials and extend his techniques. Until then he had used whatever materials were available.

In the mid-1960s Dickerson remarried, had two more children and, despite a drinking problem, continued to paint. The marriage lasted eight years, with three more years fighting for custody of their children. He moved to Brisbane, showing at Johnstone Gallery, travelled, exhibited—at times in London, returned to Sydney and finally settled at Nowra, New South Wales.

In 2013 he was awarded an AO for his outstanding contribution to the visual arts and community service to the many charities he supported.

He painted full-time, bred race horses, and lived with his third wife Jennifer, who was also his business manager. His passion for breeding and racing horses was recognised when he was appointed artist-in-residence at Moonee Valley Racing Club for the 2001–02 season. He had several children and stepchildren, 17 grandchildren and five great-grandchildren. He died of cancer on 18 October 2015.

== Bibliography ==
- Robert Dickerson – Against the Tide, Jennifer Dickerson, Pandanus Press, 1996; reprinted, Queen Street Fine Art, 2004.
- Anthologies, see Dickerson Gallery
