= TN! Theatre Company =

The TN! Theatre Company (1979–1991) was a theatre company in Brisbane, Queensland, Australia.

== History ==
The TN! Theatre Company had its roots in the Twelfth Night Theatre Company which was established in 1936 by Rhoda Mary Felgate. The company established its own theatre building in Bowen Hills in 1971, but the costs of operating the theatre lead to conflicts between artistic and commercial considerations, leading to a decoupling of the premises and the performing arts aspects of the organisation in 1979. The TN! Theatre Company was the resultant performing company which would lease premises as it required for performance.

The TN! Theatre Company formed an alliance with the Brisbane College of Education and used its performance space (the former Fortitude Valley Methodist Church) in Brookes Street, Fortitude Valley. In 1986, the TN! Theatre Company entered into a 10 year lease of the Princess Theatre in Woolloongabba. However, financial difficulties resulted in the closure of the company with its last performance in 1991.

The University of Queensland Fryer Library holds a substantial collections of records of the company.
