= Hugh Sawrey =

Australian painter (1919–1999)

Hugh David Sawrey, CBE (born in Forest Glen, Queensland 1919, died Benalla Victoria, 1999) was an Australian artist and the founder of the Australian Stockman's Hall of Fame, Longreach. Sawrey was an artist whose prolific output of paintings, and drawings of the Australian landscape and its people contributed in a profound way to the preserving of the memory of times and places in Australian history that were in danger of being overlooked and lost to posterity. Throughout his long career, he experienced firsthand events that shaped Australian identity in the 20th century and documented through his work many of the characters that lived in this period.

== Early life ==
His father, a teamster died when Hugh was only three years old. Together with his mother and older brother Alan, Hugh moved to Brisbane in the early 1930s. However, he left school when he was 15 and began working in outback Queensland to assist his family during the Great Depression. He worked a multitude of jobs from droving to shearing, travelling extensively throughout the interior of Queensland, the Northern Territory and Western Australia.

== Military service ==
He enlisted in the Army during World War II and served in the 1st Anti Tank Regiment, a Militia unit, attaining the rank of lance bombardier before transferring to the Royal Australian Air Force. He subsequently served with No. 20 Squadron RAAF, which operated Catalina flying boats in New Guinea. After his discharge at the end of the war Sawrey used his service pay to buy a mob of cattle which he ran on a small property on the Darling Downs with his mother.

== Return to Australia ==
In the following twenty years Sawrey went droving in Queensland to augment the tough years on the farm. It was in this period that he began to paint, not only small works around the campfire at night, but murals on the walls of several southwest Queensland pubs. Sawrey excelled in his murals and larger works commissioned for public spaces, with possibly the finest being "Quilty's mob", a very large framed work first commissioned to hang in the Red Bull Steakhouse in Noosa Heads in 1972.

Many of Sawrey's works were in the small town of Kogan on the Darling Downs, as he often painted murals on local buildings to pay his bills. He first visited the town after he returned from World War II, seeking work on cattle stations. In Kogan, he found encouragement for this art as well as inspiration from the rural area. He painted murals for the lounge of the Kogan Hotel and the ceiling of the Kogan post office.

In August 1950, Sawrey married Betty. However, they argued over her dog and Betty left Sawrey in November 1950. They were divorced in November 1954.

== Success as an artist ==
In 1964, Sawrey moved to Brisbane to become an artist full-time and he set up his first studio in the Royal Hotel in Queen Street, Brisbane. He studied under Brisbane artist Caroline Barker. His first dealers were Keith Moore, and later Jack Murphy of The Grand Central Gallery Brisbane, Julian Stirling, Southern Cross Gallery Melbourne and John Cooper, Eight Bells Gallery, Surfers Paradise. Later he was represented by Jim Elder Fine Art in Adelaide.

In 1964, Sawrey met and married his wife Gill on the Gold Coast.

== Stockman's Hall of Fame ==
Sawrey exhibited widely throughout Australia and in 1979 was selected as one of two Australian artists to represent Australia in "The Horses of the World" exhibition at the Tryon gallery, London, the world's foremost sporting gallery. Sawrey was also the founder and a former chairman of the Australian Stockman's Hall of Fame at Longreach. During the mid 1970s many hall of fame conceptual meetings between Sawrey and RM Williams were held at Jack Murphy's Grand Central Gallery in Brisbane. Sawrey with the assistance of Jack Murphy and Lester Padman of Boolarong press in Brisbane donated several print runs of some of his famous paintings for sale to assist in the building of the hall of fame

== Exhibitions and collections ==
In his long career Sawrey was awarded several art prizes including the Queensland Industries Fair Gold Medal and in 1989 he was appointed a CBE for services to the arts.

His work was exhibited in most of Australia's major galleries and also in London at the Tryon Gallery, following introduction of his work there by his Brisbane dealer Jack Murphy. This introduction took him onto the world stage, and caused the Tryon directors to list him in the top ten horse painters of the world. His work is represented in important public and private collections including the following collections in Australia: the Queensland Art Gallery, the Robert Holmes à Court Collection, the Sir Rupert & Lady Clarke Collection, the Lady Fairfax Collection the Robert Nesen Collection, and the National Museum of Australia. The State Library of Queensland also holds a significant collection of personal items, letters, catalogs, clippings and photographs covering his career.

Overseas collections include the Dunedin Public Art Gallery in New Zealand, the Australian Embassy in Paris; Rothschild Collection, Paris; the Lord T. Remnant Collection in the United Kingdom; King Ranch, Texas, USA and the Mitsubishi Collection in Japan.

== Legacy ==
In 2009, a documentary was made about Sawrey, titled Banjo Paterson with a Paintbrush. On 3 October 2009, the documentary premiered at the Art at Kogan festival in the presence of the Governor of Queensland, Penelope Wensley.

Sawrey is commemorated in Kogan with a sculpture and walkway. The sculpture titled Bush Friendship is on the Kogan-Condamine Road (27.0404°S 150.7614°E) and features Sawrey with his friend Nelson "Darkie" Dwyer, the former publican in Kogan. It is a lifesize sculpture in bronze and depicts the two men sitting across a table from one another, playing cards (as they often did). The sculpture forms part of the Hugh Sawrey Walk of Fame, which was funded by the Queensland Government as part of the Q150 celebrations. A sculpture of a horse with a rugged stockman on his back and the whip cutting up above his head (themes that Sawrey often painted) forms the entrance to the Kogan Community Centre.
