= Barbara Blackman =

Australian writer and arts patron (1928–2024)

Barbara Blackman AO
- Barbara Patterson with her husband artist Charles Blackman (pictured near there wedding, in 1952.
- Born: Barbara Patterson; 22 December 1928; Brisbane, Queensland, Australia
- Died: 4 October 2024 (aged 95); Canberra, Australian Capital Territory, Australia
- Occupations: Writer; poet; librettist; arts patron; artist model; radio personality; interviewer
- Notable work: All My Januaries: Pleasures of Life and Other Essays; Glass after Glass: Autobiographical Reflections; Portrait of a Friendship: The Letters of Barbara Blackman and Judith Wright
- Spouse: Charles Blackman (1952–1978)
- Children: 3

Barbara Blackman AO (née Patterson; 22 December 1928 – 4 October 2024) was an Australian writer and essayist, poet, librettist, radio broadcaster and interviewer, artist, artist's model and activist and philanthropist, who was a patron of the arts and a cultural polymath.

She was married to artist Charles Blackman from 1952 and 1978, who was best known for his Alice in Wonderland paintings, and she featured as an artist model for Blackman.

Blackman was known for her several memoirs and letter writings, and as an arts patron was a noted philanthropist, who in 2004, donated $1 million to a number of Australian music organisations, including Pro Musica, the Australian Chamber Orchestra, the Australian National University's School of Music and the Stopera Chamber Opera Company. In 2006, she was awarded the Australian Contemporary Music Award for Patronage, and was honoured with the Order of Australia (AO)in 2012.

== Early life ==
Blackman was born as Barbara Patterson in Brisbane, Queensland on 22 December 1928 with her twin sister, Coralie Hilda, who died 16 days later. Three years later her father, W.H. (Harry) Patterson, died and her mother, Gertrude Olson Patterson, was able to support them both by working as an accountant. She attended Brisbane State High School where she developed what was to be a lifelong love of music, particularly Shostakovich. She also developed an early interest in writing, and was the youngest member of a group of writers called the Barjaj Group, which included Pamela Crawford, Judith Wright and Thea Astley. She had poor eyesight from an early age and in 1950, aged 21, was diagnosed with optic atrophy. Her vision deteriorated rapidly and she became completely legally blind.

Blackman became an artist's model who was in high demand by many leading modernist artists in Australia such as Clifton Pugh and Fred Williams, and appears in many of Charles Blackman's works, including his Alice In Wonderland series of paintings.

== Writings and broadcasting ==
=== Work and interests ===
Blackman lived a self-described unconventional life according to her autobiography. In a documentary film about her, Seeing From Within, released in 2017, Blackman states, "I could not have lived a conventional life, as I could not have picked up the rules".

She exhibited a wide range of intellectual interests and abilities. For example, she wrote the libretto for Peter Sculthorpe's Eliza Surviva (an opera that was never completed because of difficulties between him and his collaborator, Patrick White), an autobiography, and a humorous book of verse. Blackman's work is highly valued, as evidenced in the collection of correspondence between Blackman and her friend, the poet Judith Wright, published in 2007, and in the list of numerous resources written by her and about her that has been collected in the Australian Women's Register. Nevertheless, Blackman has maintained a humble attitude about her intellectual pursuits, saying, "I go with the angels and they know more than we do." She said "I told them what I wanted and they showed me the way."

She was a notable as a blind activist and pioneer of radio for printed handicap and was a member of the Blind Citizens's Committee Society since 1976. Herself launching into broadcasting in the early 1980's, she recorded 149 oral history programs for the National Library of Australia, The Barbara Blackman Collectionincluded interview's with personality's associated with several genres with the arts, primarily the visual arts including painters, sculptures, potters and others, but also with writers, actors, musician's, theatre directors, architects, medical researchers, occupational therapists and ophalmologists. The interviews where conducted locally in all states of Australia, as well as in Britain and Italy between 1982 and 1989. Blackman was awarded the Australasian Sound Recording Association's Award for Excellence in Broadcasting and was considered as a significant record of "20th Century Art History".

== Personal life and death ==
She married the Australian artist Charles Blackman, in 1952, whom she had met in 1949, at his 21st birthday and they lived in Melbourne, supported by her income as an artist's model and from the blind pension and his earnings as a kitchen hand, most of which went to pay for costs associated with maintaining Charles' studio. They divorced in 1978, after having been married 27 years, after Charles' alcoholism had escalated over their marriage which she described as "one of the great marriages, which lasted as long as possible, and a bit longer". with Charles Blackman she had three children Auguste and Christabel, both of whom became artists and or authors, and Barnaby (died 2021).

Blackman later married Frenchman Marcel Veldhoven and moved with him to a retreat on the South Coast of NSW. When this relationship ended in March 2002, she moved to Canberra, where Adrian Keenan, a former music teacher who once resided with the Blackman's became her carer.

Blackman, was brought up as Christian and was an admirer of different cultures and religions, in her later years she was interested in Jungian philosophy. Apart from her blindness, she had been partially deaf and bedridden in her last 12 years. She died at Clare Holland House in Canberra on 4 October 2024, at the age of 95.

== Recognition ==
Blackman was appointed Officer of the Order of Australia (AO) in 2012 for "distinguished service to the arts and to the community, as a supporter of artistic performance, through philanthropic contributions, and as an advocate for people who are blind and partially sighted."

Nigel Thomson's portrait of Blackman won the Archibald Prize in 1997.

== Published works ==
- Certain Chairs, published by Viking Press
- Barbara and Charles Blackman Talk About Food (Taylor, John), published by Rigby, a division of Houghton Mifflin Harcourt
- Glass after Glass : Autobiographical Reflections, Penguin Books/Viking, 1997 ISBN 0140260331/ISBN 0670872725
- All My Januaries: Pleasures of Life and Other Essays, University of Queensland Press, 2016, ISBN 9780702254178
- Portrait of a Friendship: The Letters of Barbara Blackman and Judith Wright (Bryony Cosgrove), published by The Miegunyah Press, a division of Melbourne University Press
