= Joan Whalley =

Australian actress, teacher and artistic director (1927–2021)

Joan Whalley OAM
- Born: Joan Agnes Whalley; December 1927; Charters Towers, Queensland, Australia
- Died: 27 August 2021 (aged 93); Beerwah, Queensland, Australia
- Occupations: Theatre director, stage actress, teacher

Joan Agnes Whalley, OAM (December 1927 – 27 August 2021), was an Australian actress, teacher and artistic director of Twelfth Night Theatre in Bowen Hills, Brisbane, from 1962 to 1976.

== Early years ==
Whalley was born in December 1927 and went to school at Blackheath College in Charters Towers where she gained her Queensland Senior Certificate. Rhoda Felgate, MBE, a visiting examiner in Speech and Drama and also artistic director of Twelfth Night Theatre in Brisbane, had seen considerable ability in Whalley as a young student acting in college plays. Whalley went on to study Speech and Drama through Trinity College, London and for a time was a teacher at her old school. Knowing the standard of Whalley's teaching, Felgate invited her in 1950 to come to Twelfth Night Theatre, beginning in 1951 as a teacher and student. In an interview in 1978, Whalley commented on the period,

"I was attending classes and teaching private pupils ... Every night when I finished teaching I would go to an acting class, a mime class or a fencing class .."

Whalley also commented on her first directing experience at Twelfth Night Theatre,

"The first play I directed ... In those days we had one act play competitions in the theatre, which I believe is a very good things for directors ... the first year I won."

Whalley went on to study a course in theatre production later in the 1950s at the London Actors Studio, a training institution that placed emphasis on a new acting style advocating realism and scorn for inhibitions.

== National Institute of Dramatic Art ==
In 1958, Whalley attended a drama school at the University of New South Wales. Robert Quentin, who had noted Whalley's success as a director of Waiting for Godot by Samuel Beckett and also the Queensland Centenary Pageant in 1959, invited her to lecture in voice for two years at the National Institute of Dramatic Art in Sydney as part of its foundation staff.

== Twelfth Night Theatre and other roles ==
Whalley succeeded Rhoda Felgate, MBE, who had founded the company in 1936, as artistic director at Twelfth Night Theatre. Starting in 1962 Whalley presented an extremely large range of productions, both period and modern, and was a strong advocate for Australian Theatre. Her production of King Lear by William Shakespeare in 1966 was commended by theatre critic, Bob Hart, who commented in the Brisbane 'Courier Mail',

"Director Joan Whalley has done a tremendous job with 'Lear', and has made full use of her cast."

As artistic director, she was not afraid to push established boundaries. One such case was the staging of Norm and Ahmed by Australian playwright, Alexander Buzo in 1966. The play is about racial bigotry and ends with Norm using offensive language attacking Ahmed. After the use of the offensive material, Queensland Police rushed on to the stage and arrested actor, Norm Staines and carted him off to the Brisbane Watch-house. Local Brisbane actors rallied to his defence and raised the bail monies and Staines continued performing until the end of the season. The case came to trial before the Magistrates Court. Staines was eventually convicted and fined, but on appeal to the Supreme Court was cleared. The police appealed the decision before the High Court who found there was no case to answer. Whalley commented on the fiasco stating,

"The judgement of the Full Court is a judgement in favour of theatre in Brisbane. Theatre belongs to the people, and symbolises the feelings and actions of the people. If theatre is to be a true picture of humanity, actors must be able to say what is said in true life, and in the circumstances of life."

Whalley taught well-known Australian actors, such as Judith McGrath, Sigrid Thornton, Penny Downie, Rowena Wallace, Russell Kiefel, Carol Burns. Michael Caton, Brian Blain and Rex Cramphorne.

Apart from being artistic director of Twelfth Night Theatre, Whalley was also an accomplished actor. Before Twelfth Night Theatre was forced to give up its theatre at Gowrie Hall, purchased in 1956, in Wickham Terrace in central Brisbane due to its impending demolition to make way for the Turbot Street Expressway, Whalley appeared in the lead role in Hedda Gabler by Henrik Ibsen.

In 1970, Whalley directed 'Looking Glass on Yesteryear' by playwright Jill Morris, staged before The Queen in the Brisbane City Hall as part of the Captain Cook bicentenary celebrations. Among the cast were budding performers and future drama teachers Sigrid Thornton, David Logan and Katy Morris, all students of Whalley.

Whalley was responsible for the building of Twelfth Night Theatre complex at Bowen Hills, which opened in 1971. The Brisbane Courier-Mail featured a full-page spread for the grand opening of "Twelfth Night's new $350,000 theatre complex at Bowen Hills".

Prior to the opening of the theatre, she directed a successful production of Under Milk Wood by Dylan Thomas in a tent where the theatre now stands.

Whalley was also a foundation member of the Queensland Theatre Company's board and major contributor to the theatrical community in Brisbane. Whalley sat on the Theatre Board for the Australian Council for the Arts, the State Board of the ABC, and the Board of the New Moon Theatre Company in Townsville.

For many years Whalley directed the Lord Mayor of Brisbane's Christmas in Storyland Pantomime at the Brisbane City Hall.

== Honours ==
On 10 June 2002, Whalley was awarded the Medal of the Order of Australia by Queen Elizabeth II. The citation read: "For service to the performing arts as an actor, teacher, director, artistic director and administrator."

== Later life and death ==
After leaving her position at Twelfth Night Theatre, Whalley maintained an active interest in theatre. For a time she held the position of Director of the Eastern Region of the Queensland Arts Council.

Whalley died on 27 August 2021, aged 93 in a nursing home in Beerwah, Queensland

== Personal life ==
Joan Whalley was married to the late Stuart Benson.
