= Twelfth Night Theatre =

Theatre in Brisbane, Australia

Coordinates: 27°26′50.24″S 153°2′18.06″E

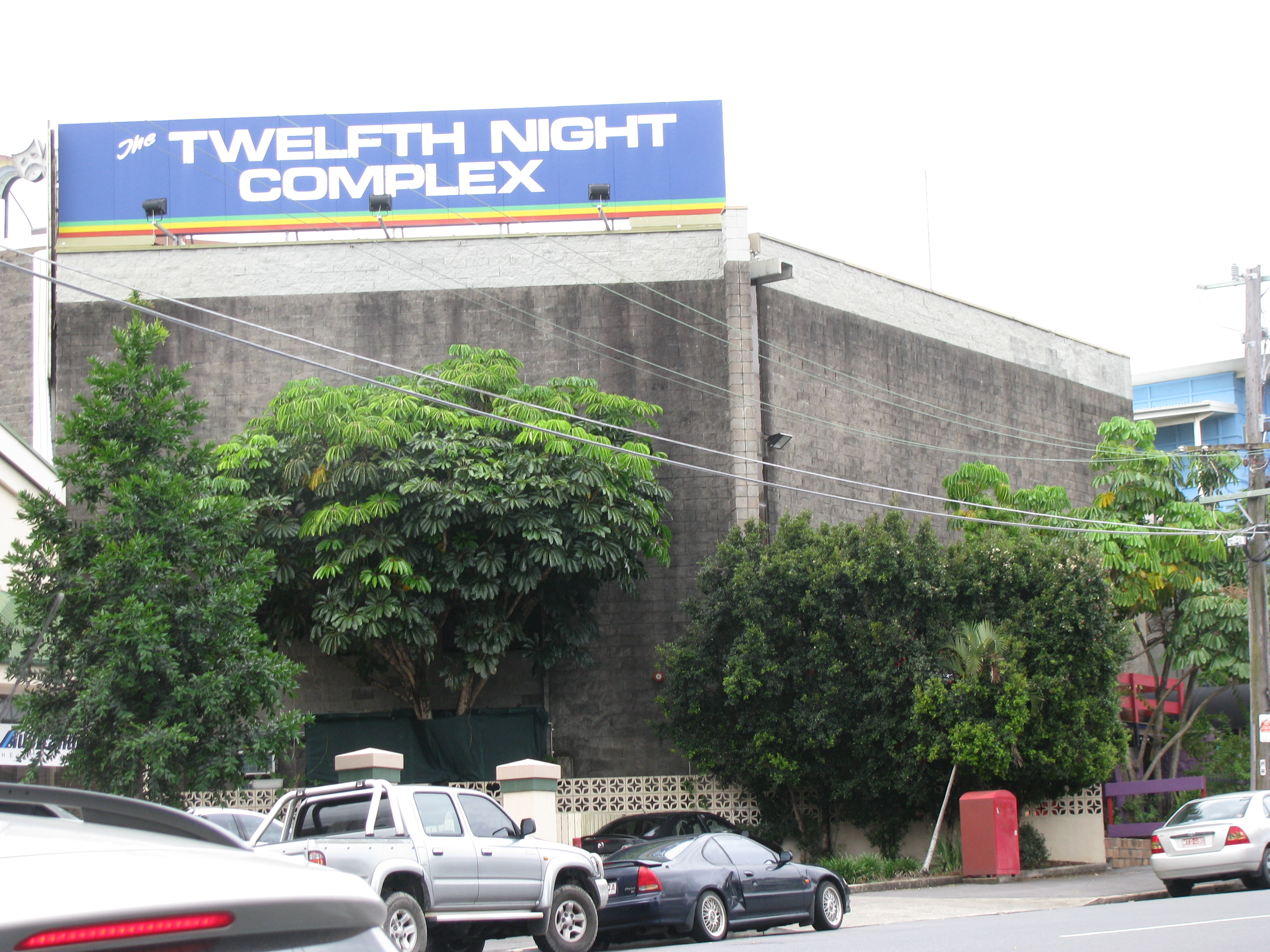
Twelfth Night Theatre

The Twelfth Night Theatre is an established Australian entertainment venue located in Bowen Hills, in Brisbane, Queensland. Many notable actors, both international and Australian, have performed there.

The Twelfth Night Complex includes the main theatre and a smaller basement area which used to home dinner theatre as of 2022 due to managerial differences.

== History ==
=== Founding in the 1930s ===
The Twelfth Night Players was an amateur group founded by Rhoda Mary Felgate who had directed many plays for the Brisbane Repertory Theatre Society. That society was for advanced performers and she believed that with her teaching skills she could found a new company for a company of improving amateurs who could perform important plays. When it started performing the company consisted of only a dozen or more actors. In the first three years of Twelfth Night Theatre the company staged 21 different plays. In 1937 Stanley Hildebrandt and Lorna Forbes were in the cast of Shakespeare's Twelfth Night.

In the 1940s the company performed many new plays which Felgate was able to source including John Van Druten's I Remember Mama, Shaw's 1939 play In Good King Charles's Golden Days and the eponymous Gas Light. In 1948 the company found its first location on Wickham Terrace where it occupied two floors; the upper for play rehearsal and the lower for teachers. In 1955 Rhoda Felgate became a Member of the Most Excellent Order of the British Empire. In the following year the company obtained a church hall on Wickham Terrace named Gowrie Hall which became their small theatre. Felgate appeared in I Remember Mama before retiring from the company in 1962, but continued her association as its Patron. Joan Whalley was the artistic director of Twelfth Night Theatre from 1962 to 1976.

Twelfth Night Theatre was relocated to its present location following the demolition of its former building due to the construction of the Turbot Street Bypass in 1971. The land was sold in 1966 by Brian Johnstone and Marjorie Johnstone, who also owned the adjacent Johnstone Gallery.

Funds for the purchase were raised by the theatre, the Johnstones and the Myer family. The location of the new theatre designed by Vitaly Gzell, next door to the Johnstone Gallery in Cintra Road, Bowen Hills, was part of the Johnstones' attempt to create a cultural enclave embracing both performing and visual arts for Brisbane.

Notable production staged in the gardens of the Johnstone Gallery by Twelfth Night Theatre of productions included Aristophanes' Lysistrata, held between 24 April and 27 April 1962, with the set and costumes designed by Quentin Hole.

The 1967 program for the Johnstone Gallery included plans for a modern theatre at Cintra Road, Bowen Hills, which was to be linked to the gallery by gardens. The Johnstones anticipated a joint audience, and encouraged gallery clients to also become members of the theatre.

Prior to the commencement of the building of the theatre, a production of Under Milk Wood by Dylan Thomas was staged in a tent on the site of the future theatre. Twelfth Night Theatre operated its offices for a time in a house in Abbotsford Road which backed on to the future Theatre land.

Construction work commenced at the new site on 14 November 1969. In 1970, Johnstone Gallery openings were changed from the traditional Sundays to Friday evenings, due to the unexpectedly prompt completion of the theatre. Nonetheless, the theatre did not open until February 1971. The Johnstones were delighted, as Brian wrote to Sidney Nolan:

"...with the new half-million dollar theatre next door, the establishment is now nicely rounded off, so perhaps one of these days Marjorie and I will be able to play ladies and gentlemen of the art world!"

The Twelfth Night Theatre Club made headlines when it opened just before the theatre on 12 February 1971. The theatre club's "12 to 12 license was the first granted under provisions written into the liquor acts in a review last March". There was also significant for women in these new provisions, as suggested in "Sylvia's Woman to Woman" column:

"The official opening of the Twelfth Night Theatre Club on Tuesday night was the most exciting event of the week. It's cozy and intimate and snugly positioned in the basement of the soon-to-be-completed Twelfth Night Theatre complex at Bowen Hills... It's a club where women share equal status with men (at least we've made it in one field, girls) and it's the first place I've been in where I've been able to front up to the bar, order a drink from Barman Eddy, pay for it myself and still feel feminine..."

The Johnstones had loaned "magnificent pictures and sculptures" to the Club premises as an indication of their support.

Twelfth Night Theatre opened with two productions: A Flea In Her Ear by Georges Feydeau directed by Joan Whalley and The Rose and the Ring based on the work of William Makepeace Thackeray. The latter production was directed by Bill Pepper, former Head of Voice at the National Institute of Dramatic Art, NIDA, Sydney. Noted designer, Gloria Ida Logan worked on the production.

Among many other productions, a highlight was Guess Who's Coming to Dinner starring Frank Thring and Joan Whalley supported by a strong local cast. Whalley also directed the production.

In June 1972, however, Marjorie's failing health forced her resignation from the Twelfth Night Theatre Committee. Despite this, she continued to support the theatre and its work, as evidenced in the 1994 memorial to her by later owner Gail Wiltshire.

For years Twelfth Night Theatre had run a successful Junior Theatre Workshop, a training ground for many later successful actors. Tutors including such talent as June Finney, Judith McGrath and Carol Burns.

The building of Twelfth Night Theatre at Bowen Hills was a brave and enormous undertaking. Due to the cost of the new building, Twelfth Night Theatre Company, which was initially established as an amateur theatre company under foundation artistic director Rhoda Felgate in 1936, was forced to turn professional in a bid to gain financial support from both the Queensland and Australian governments. However, sufficient funding was not forthcoming and as a result, the theatre was sold to the State Government. Rather than seeing the theatre as a considerable cultural asset for the people of Brisbane, the Queensland government simply sold the theatre, in what can only be seen as a very short-sighted policy, to recoup monies spent. Queensland had no professional theatre company until the establishment of the Queensland Theatre Company in 1969. Considerable praise should be given to the role of Twelfth Night Theatre in the theatre history of Brisbane and Queensland. The current owner, Gail Wiltshire wrote of the deplorable state of the theatre building:

"When I moved into Twelfth Night Theatre in 1977, the challenges were enormous, almost impossible - a debt of $1.3 million, a vandalised theatre. I kept thinking of the women in my past - the long sea journey, the dray, the babies buried in small wooden coffins, the house with a mud floor. Nothing was too difficult. But then I had an immediate source of inspiration - Marjorie Johnstone. How I loved that amazing woman. She gave me courage. She pulled no punches about human nature. There are the good ones and the duds. Sometimes bastards. She was right.'"

at the end of 1976, the original Twelfth Night Theatre Company folded. In 1979, the successor group, TN! Theatre Company was spun-off to operate solely as a performing company that would lease whatever premises as required for performance. In 1986 it took a 10-year lease of the Princess Theatre in Woolloongabba, and its last performance was in 1991 due to financial difficulties.

=== Later years ===
Twelfth Night Theatre is the only privately owned theatre in Australia, owned by Ken and Gail Wiltshire. It is not controlled by any commercially funded or government organisation and receives no public grants from either the Queensland State or Australian federal governments.

The Twelfth Night Theatre continues as a contemporary theatre and has attracted over a number of years various British comedies starring such well-known actors as John Inman from the long-running television series, Are You Being Served, Gorden Kaye and Sue Hodge from Allo Allo. Other commercial productions have included Blithe Spirit by Noël Coward starring Rowena Wallace and June Salter.

In 2007, an Australian season of Allo Allo was staged starring actors from the original British television series, Gorden Kaye, Guy Siner and Sue Hodge.

Stagedoor Dinner Theatre has run dinner theatre shows in the basement theatre for seven years.

== Notable performers ==
Australian actors, who have appeared at the theatre, include:

- Tony Bonner
- Carol Burns
- Claire Crowther
- Penny Downie
- Jon English
- Beverly Langford
- Judith McGrath
- June Salter
- Sigrid Thornton
- Frank Thring
- Rowena Wallace
- Kate Wilson

== Selected recent productions ==
Year	Production	Author	Director	Cast
1995	Same Time, Next Year	Bernard Slade		Karl Howman and Penny Cook
1996	Only When I Laugh	Eric Chappell		Geoffrey Hughes, Tony Bonner, Kimberly Joseph
1997	Run for Your Wife	Ray Cooney	Peter Williams	Max Gillies and Gorden Kaye
1998	Noises Off	Michael Frayn	Peter Williams	Jon English, Max Gillies, Katy Manning, Chelsea Brown, Bruce Samazan, Cathy Godbold, Simon Burvill-Holmes. Lisa Broadby, Brian Cahill, lynette Pelgrave
1999	A Passionate Woman	Kay Mellor	Dan Crawford	Geoffrey Hughes, Linda Robson, Paul Mercurio
2000	Don't Dress for Dinner	Marc Camoletti	Peter Farago	Dennis Waterman, Jon English, Sue Hodge, Tottie Goldsmith, Lisa Broadby, Ron Reeve
2001	Are You Being Served?			John Inman, Jon English, Joan Sydney, Tony Bonner, Lucky Grills, Ron Haddrick
2002	It Runs in the Family	Ray Cooney	Peter Farago	Gorden Kaye, Judy Cornwell, Robert Coleby, Sue Hodge, Lucky Grills, Katy Manning, Chris Betts, Jason Gann, Elaine Cusick, David Clendinning, Lisa Broadby
2003	Bedside Manners		Peter Farago	John Inman, Jon English, Chris Betts, Dragitsa Debert, Lisa Broadby
2004	Dad's Army			Chris Betts, Jon English, Steven Tandy, Tony Alcock, Sheila Bradley, Lee Young, David Knijnenburg
2005	Run for Your Wife	Ray Cooney	Peter Farago	Chris Betts, Andrew Booth, Karen Crone, Steve Haddan, Tony Alcock, Steven Tandy, Lisa Broadby, David Knijnenburg
2007	Menopause The Musical			
2007	Respect - A Musical Journey of Women			
2007	'Allo 'Allo!	David Croft and Jeremy Lloyd	Peter Farago	Gorden Kaye, Sue Hodge, Guy Siner, Katy Manning, Steven Tandy, Chloe Dallimore, Jason Gann, Chris Betts, David Knijnenburg, Karen Crone, Lisa Broadby, Peter Cossar
2007	Carousel	Richard Rodgers and Oscar Hammerstein II	Tony Alcock	Scott Irwin, Katrina Retallick, Dale Pengelly, Nicci Hope, Karen Crone, Jason Gann, Kate Peters, David Knijnenburg, Michael Butler, James Brown, Nick Jelicic (Vacic), Rebecca Elise Lamb
2009	The 39 Steps	Patrick Barlow (based on the novel by John Buchan)	Maria Aitken	Mark Pegler, Jo Turner, Drew Forsythe, Helen Christinson, Octavia Barron Martin

== Books and Archival Information ==
- Sweeney, Brian (1986). Sweeney on Sweeney. Canberra: Clouston and Hall.
- Wiltshire, Gail (1994). Picnic At Hanging Rock. Brisbane: Twelfth Night Theatre.
- Johnstone Gallery Archives. Brisbane: State Library of Queensland. 1968–1971.
- Thackeray, William Makepeace (1971). The Rose and The Ring. Brisbane: Twelfth Night Theatre Company.
