= Neville Weston =

Australian-British figurative painter

Neville Weston (1936 – 2017) was a figurative painter, academic and writer. Based in Australia for many years, before relocating to the United Kingdom in 2005 he held a number of Australia's top academic posts in the field of performing and visual arts, as well as working as an art critic across numerous publications.

As a painter his work is represented in major collections internationally. His role as a key player in the Liverpool avant-garde art scene has been noted in the Tate Liverpool's 2007 exhibition Liverpool - Creative Centre of the Universe. During his time in Liverpool (1960–1975) he was closely associated with artists including Adrian Henri and Keith Arnatt.

== Academia ==
Born in Birmingham, UK in 1936, he studied painting, drawing, and lithography at Stourbridge School of Art, 1952–1956 (awarded National Diploma in Design) before attending the Slade School of Fine Art, University College London, 1956, 1957, 1958 (awarded University of London Diploma in Fine Art). At the Slade he was a student of William Coldstream, Claude Rogers, Lucian Freud and Ernst Gombrich. Weston also attended the Courtauld Institute of Art history and studied under Anthony Blunt and Douglas Cooper.

He was a lecturer at Liverpool College of Art 1961–1965, teaching drawing and painting, and then principal lecturer and head of school at University of Manchester Colleges of Education division, Padgate College of Education (1965–1975).

His first association with Australia came with a visiting fellowship at the Australian National University Humanities Research Centre, Canberra, 1975. In 1977 he relocated to Australia to teach Art History and Theory, South Australian School of Art, University of South Australia before moving to Perth to become Dean of School of Visual Art., Western Australian Academy of Performing Arts, Edith Cowan University, Perth. 1991–2001 then Adjunct Professor, Curtin University of Technology, 2001–c.2010 and Professor at James Cook University, Townsville teaching painting and art history.

Weston wrote extensively about Australian art, was art critic on The Advertiser in the 1980s, contributed to Art and Australia, and was the biographer of leading Australian artist Lawrence Daws.

== Works ==
He was a founding member of W.E.B.A. Group, Liverpool, Designers and Consultants in colour, mural decoration, exhibition design, display and typography. The other members were John Edkins, Arthur Ballard and Keith Arnatt. Between 1963 and 1966 we fulfilled several commissions for Liverpool architects, including several major sculpture works, as well as ephemeral pieces for exhibitions, fashion shows and music/dance events.

He continued to exhibit actively and has had pieces included in the Royal Academy Summer Show 2006 and at Adam Street Club 2007. His last major exhibition was for the Threadneedle Prize, at the Mall Galleries, London in September 2010. Sadly bad health over the following years slowed him, prior to his death in March 2017. His work is viewable online at nevilleweston.co.uk .

== Books ==
His books include:

- 'Franz Kempf: Graphic Works'. Wakefield Press, Adelaide 1984.
- 'In the Public Eye: Art in Public Places in Australia'. Visual Arts Board of the Australia Council, Sydney, 1983.
- 'Lawrence Daws'. AH and AW Reed, Sydney, 1982.
- 'Kaleidoscope of Modern Art', George Harrap, London.. Revised edition, 1978, first edition, 1968.
- 'The Reach of Modern Art', Harper and Row, New York, 1970
- 'Kaleidoscop der Modernen Kunst. Bertelsman Kunst Verlag, Gutersloh, 1970
