= Rhoda Felgate =

Australian speech and drama teacher and theatre director

Rhoda Felgate MBE
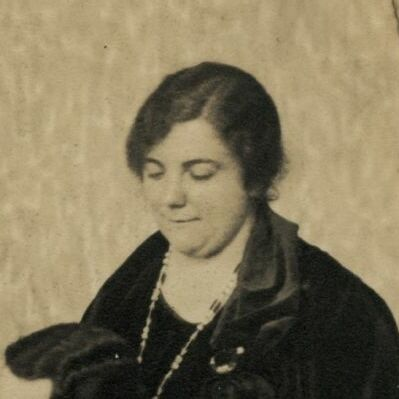
- in 1932
- Born: Rhoda Mary Felgate; 31 July 1901; Stoke Newington, England
- Died: 14 September 1990 (aged 89); Auchenflower, Queensland, Australia
- Occupations: Theatre director, drama and speech teacher, actress and theatre director
- Known for: Founder of Twelfth Night Theatre
- Successor: Joan Whalley

Rhoda Mary Felgate MBE (31 July 1901 – 15 September 1990) was an English Australian theatre founder and director, speech and drama teacher and actress. She founded the Twelfth Night Theatre in Brisbane, Queensland in 1936.

== Biography ==
Felgate was born in Stoke Newington, England in 1901. Her parents were Alice Maude (born Willson) and her husband Gordon Felgate and they emigrated to Australia while she was still a baby. Her father travelled as a company representative. They made their home in Brisbane in 1910 where she attended Brisbane Girls Grammar School.

The Twelfth Night Players was an amateur group founded by Felgate. It was named "Twelfth Night" because it intended to perform of the twelfth night of every month. Felgate had directed many plays for the Brisbane Repertory Theatre Society. A society that was for advanced performers. Felgate believed that, with her teaching skills, she could found a new company for improving amateurs who would perform important plays. When it started performing, the company consisted of only a dozen or more amateur actors.

The Twelfth Night company first performed in March 1936 at the Empire Chambers. In the first three years of the company, it staged 21 different plays including works by the British playwrights J. M. Barrie, A. A. Milne and J. B. Priestley.

Felgate travelled abroad in 1939 and in 1947. In the 1940s Twelfth Night Theatre performed many plays new to Australia which Felgate was able to source including John Van Druten's I Remember Mama, Shaw's 1939 play In Good King Charles's Golden Days, Krasna's 1944 play Dear Ruth and the eponymous Gas Light.

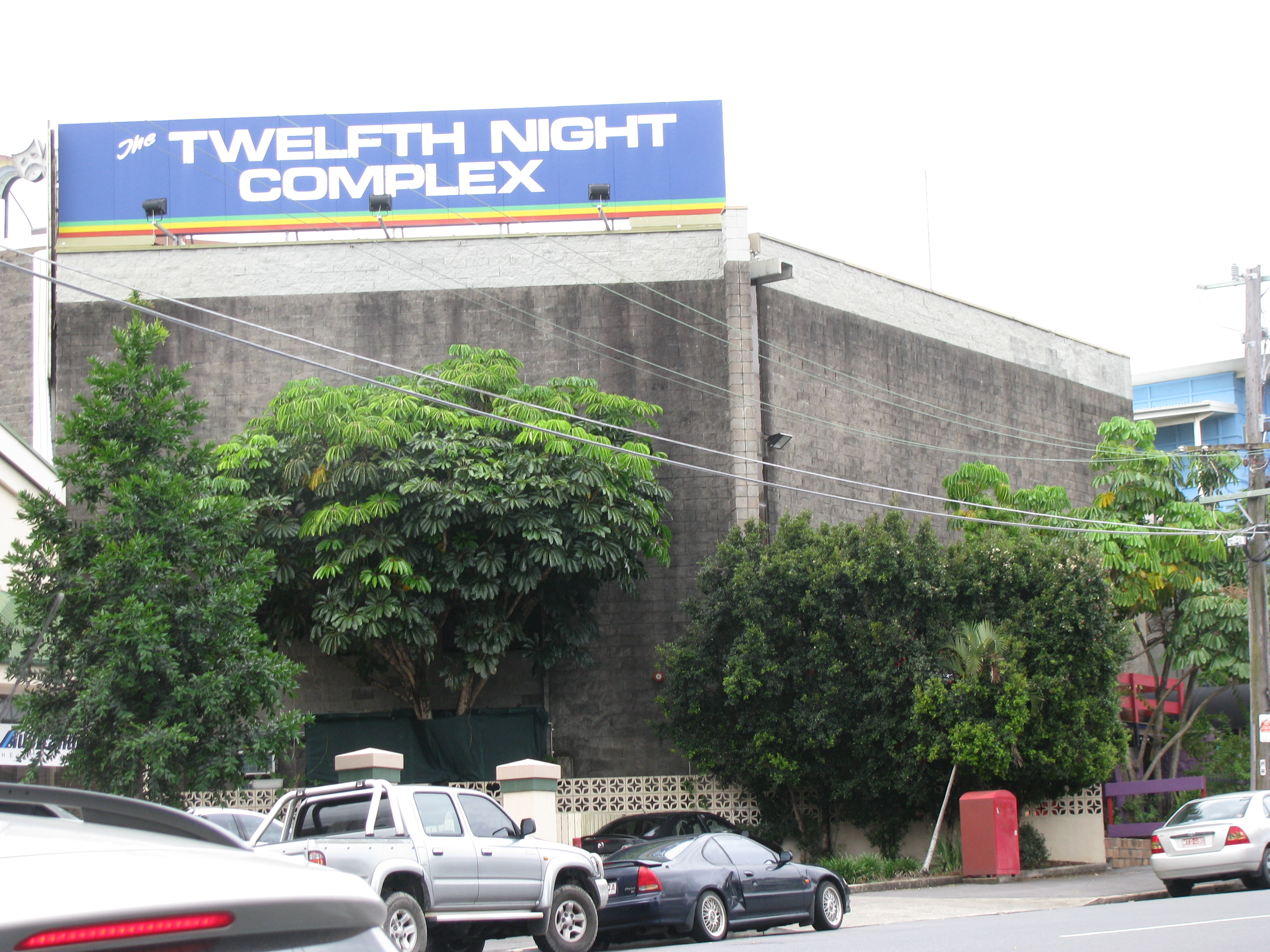
Twelfth Night Theatre (Brisbane, Queensland) in 2010

In 1948 the company found its first location in a large building on Wickham Terrace where it occupied two floors; the upper for play rehearsal and the lower for teaching. In 1955, Felgate became a Member of the Most Excellent Order of the British Empire. In the following year the company obtained a church hall on Wickham Terrace named Gowrie Hall which became their small theatre. Felgate appeared in another showing of I Remember Mama before retiring from the company in 1962. She continued her association as its Patron while Joan Whalley took over as the artistic director of Twelfth Night Theatre.

Felgate died on 15 September 1990, aged 89 in Auchenflower, Queensland.
