= Ray Crooke =

Ray Crooke AM
- Born: Ray Austin Crooke; 12 July 1922; Auburn, Victoria, Australia
- Died: 5 December 2015 (aged 93); Palm Cove, Queensland, Australia
- Education: Swinburne University of Technology
- Spouse: June Bethel (m. 1951; died 2013)
- Awards: Archibald Prize; 1969 George Johnston

Ray Austin Crooke AM (12 July 1922 – 5 December 2015) was an Australian artist known for his landscapes. He won the Archibald Prize in 1969 with a portrait of George Johnston.

== Early life ==
Ray Crooke was born in Auburn, Victoria in 1922. He spent time in Townsville, Cape York and other parts of northern Australia joining the Australian Army during World War II, service number VX88344 between August 1941 and July 1946.

== Career ==
After the war, he enrolled in Art School at Swinburne University of Technology and later travelled to New Guinea, Tahiti and Fiji. In 1949 he travelled to the Torres Strait, returning to Melbourne in 1951 to marry June Bethell. A diary of his time in the Torres Strait is held by the State Library of Queensland.

His portrait of the novelist George Johnston won the Archibald Prize in 1969, and the University of Queensland owns three of Ray Crooke's portrait paintings: Portrait of Xavier Herbert (1977), Portrait of Professor Emeritus Sir Zelman Cowen, (1919–2011), Vice-Chancellor 1970–1977 (1977) and Portrait of Sadie Herbert (1980). However, he is not known usually for portrait painting. He is known for serene views of Islander people and ocean landscapes, many of which are based on the art of Paul Gauguin. He was responsible for the dust-jacket for Poor Fellow My Country by Xavier Herbert.

During the sixties, the Crooks lived in Sydney and Melbourne, making regular trips to Thursday Island, New Guinea, Cape York and Fiji. He frequently exhibited his work at the Johnstone gallery in Brisbane and the Macquarie Galleries, Sydney. For Crooke, the Johnstone Gallery was pivotal to his success, beginning with his first solo exhibition there in 1960, and continuing, largely unabated, ever since. His Island Journal is dedicated "to the memory of Brian and Marjorie Johnstone", an indication of their influence on his life as an artist.

His painting The Offering (1971) is in the Vatican Museum collection. Many of his works are in Australian galleries.

"North of Capricorn" was an Australian touring retrospective exhibition in 1997 organised by the Perc Tucker Regional Gallery (Townsville), initiated and curated by Grafico Topico's writer and curator Sue Smith.

He was made a Member of the Order of Australia in the 1993 Australia Day Honours, "in recognition of service to the arts, particularly as a landscape artist".

Crooke died on 5 December 2015 at the age of 93.

Awards
Preceded by William Edwin Pidgeon	Archibald Prize; 1969 for George Johnston	Succeeded by Eric Smith
