= Charles Blackman =

Australian artist (1928–2018)

Charles Blackman OBE
- Born: Charles Raymond Blackman; 12 August 1928; Sydney, Australia
- Died: 20 August 2018 (aged 90); Sydney, Australia
- Education: East Sydney Technical College
- Occupation: Painter
- Known for: Alice in Wonderland series
- Political party: Antipodeans
- Spouse(s): Barbara Patterson; Genevieve de Couvreur; Victoria Bower
- Children: 6

Charles Raymond Blackman OBE (12 August 1928 – 20 August 2018) was an Australian painter, noted for the Schoolgirl, Avonsleigh and Alice in Wonderland series of the 1950s. He was a member of the Antipodeans, a group of Melbourne painters that also included Arthur Boyd, David Boyd, John Brack, Robert Dickerson, John Perceval, and Clifton Pugh. He was married for 27 years to author, essayist, poet, librettist and patron of the arts Barbara Blackman.

== Early life and initial success ==
Blackman, born 12 August 1928 in Sydney, left school at 13 and worked as an illustrator with The Sun newspaper while attending night classes at East Sydney Technical College (1943–46) though was principally self-taught. He was later awarded an honorary doctorate. He came to notice following his move to Melbourne in the mid-1940s, where he became friends with Joy Hester, John Perceval and Laurence Hope as well as gaining the support of critic and art patron John Reed. His work met critical acclaim through his early Schoolgirl and Alice series, the latter Blackman's conception of Lewis Carroll's most famous character. For some time while painting the Alice series, Blackman worked as a cook at a café run by art dealer Georges Mora and his wife, fellow artist Mirka Mora.

In 1959 he was a signatory to the Antipodean Manifesto, a statement protesting against the dominance of abstract expressionism. The manifesto's adherents have been dubbed the Antipodeans Group.

Blackman's own work is associated with dreamlike images tinged with mystery and foreboding. In 1960 he and his family lived in London after Blackman won a Helena Rubenstein travelling scholarship, settling in Sydney upon his return five and a half years later. In 1970 he moved to Paris, when awarded an atelier studio in the Cité internationale des arts. He lived there for a year at the same time as John Coburn, and subsequently returned often, as Paris was for him a lasting source of inspiration.

After 27 years of marriage, Blackman divorced his wife Barbara in 1978, largely because of his alcoholism. He married the young artist Genevieve de Couvreur, a 19-year-old friend of his children. She divorced him after eight years, as his alcoholism grew deeper, and in 1989 he married a third wife, Victoria Bower, whom he also later divorced. He had six children, Auguste, Christabel, Barnaby, Beatrice, Felix and Axiom, most of them artists and musicians in their own right.

== Later life ==
Blackman's accountant and close friend, Tom Lowenstein, set up the Charles Blackman Trust to manage his affairs. Lowenstein periodically sold off Blackman's works to pay his expenses. He lived with dementia in a rented home in Sydney. On 20 August 2018, a week after his 90th birthday, he died in the aged care facility he moved into earlier that year.

== Recognition ==
Blackman was appointed an Officer of the Order of the British Empire (OBE) for services to Australian art in 1977.

A portrait of Blackman by Jon Molvig won the Archibald Prize in 1966.

In August 2010, the Blackman Hotel opened in St Kilda Road, Melbourne. It features 670 digitally reproduced fine art prints by Blackman.

Ursula Dubosarsky's novel The Golden Day was directly inspired by Blackman's 1954 painting Floating Schoolgirl, which is in the collection of the National Gallery of Australia in Canberra.

== See also ==
- Australian art
