= Lawrence Daws =

Australian painter and printmaker (1927–2025)

- Born: 25 December 1927; South Australia, Australia
- Died: 8 October 2025 (aged 97)
- Occupations: Painter, printmaker
- Known for: Landscape painting, computer-generated prints

Lawrence Daws (25 December 1927 – 8 October 2025) was an Australian painter and printmaker, who worked in the media of oil, watercolour, drawing, screenprints, etchings and monotypes.

== Life and career ==
In the 1980s he started making computer prints, and was possibly the first established Australian painter to use this medium.

His subjects are often landscapes, including deserts, of Tasmanian forests and the tropical rainforests of Queensland.

Daws grew up on the Fleurieu Peninsula in South Australia, and from 1970 until 2010, lived by the Glasshouse Mountains at Beerwah on the edge of a Queensland rainforest, where many of his best-known works were created.

In the 1960s he lived and exhibited in London in solo shows and with other Australians, including Brett Whiteley.

From 1977 he was a Trustee of the Queensland Art Gallery and was responsible for acquiring some major paintings for the gallery, including a major painting by Victor Pasmore.

A biography of Daws was published in 1982, written by Neville Weston.

Griffith University, Brisbane, and University of the Sunshine Coast, Queensland have awarded honorary doctorates to Daws.

In 2016 Lawrence Daws was interviewed in a digital story and oral history for the State Library of Queensland's James C Sourris AM Collection. In the interview Daws talks to Bettina MacAulay, a Brisbane Art Valuer about his life, his paintings and computer generated prints, and how his interest in philosophy, literature and psychology has influenced his work.

Daws died on 8 October 2025, at the age of 97.

== Exhibitions ==
Adelaide Festival, Feb-March 2008 – Major retrospective Drawings, Prints, 1947–2007

== Collections ==
- Art Gallery of NSW
- National Gallery of Victoria
- The Tate, London
- Ipswich Art Gallery
- Exhibition and artist ephemera held by the State Library of Queensland
- QAGOMA
