= James Crawford =

James Crawford may refer to:

== Politics ==
- James Crawford (Australian politician) (1870–1916), barrister and member of the Queensland Legislative Assembly
- James Crawford (Canadian politician) (1816–1878), Canadian businessman and MP for Brockville, 1867–1872
- James Crawford (trade unionist) (1896–1982), Scottish trade unionist
- James J. Crawford (1871–1954), New York state senator
- James Sharman Crawford (1812–1878), Member of Parliament for County Down, 1874–1878
- James W. Crawford Jr. (born 1937), Democratic member of the North Carolina General Assembly
- James Adair Crawford, civil servant of the British Empire

== Sports ==
- James Crawford (Burnley footballer) (fl. 1902–1904), Scottish footballer, played for Burnley F.C.
- James Crawford (footballer, born 1877) (1877–?), Scottish footballer for Sunderland
- James Crawford (footballer, born 1904) (1904–1976), Scottish footballer, played for Queen's Park F.C., Scotland and Great Britain
- James Crawford (American football) (born 1994), American football player
- James Crawford (basketball) (born 1960), American basketball player in the National Basketball League of Australia
- James Crawford (alpine skier) (born 1997), Canadian alpine skier

== Other ==
- James Crawford (lawyer) (1808–1863) was an Edinburgh lawyer and Deputy Assembly Clerk.
- James Crawford (playwright) (1908–1973), Australian playwright and journalist
- James Crawford (jurist) (1948–2021), Australian legal academic
- James Coutts Crawford (1760–1828), Royal Navy officer
- James Coutts Crawford (1817–1889), scientist, explorer, and New Zealand public servant
- James Chamberlain Crawford (1880–1950), American entomologist
- James Harvey Crawford (1845–1930), founder of Steamboat Springs, Colorado
- James "Sugar Boy" Crawford (1934–2012), American rhythm and blues singer

== See also ==
- Jim Crawford (disambiguation)
