= James Craufurd =

James Craufurd may refer to:

- James Craufurd, Lord Ardmillan (1805–1876), Scottish judge
- James Craufurd (British Army officer) (1804–1888), British general

== See also ==
- James Crawford (disambiguation)
