= Pamela Crawford =

Stage designer (1921-1997)

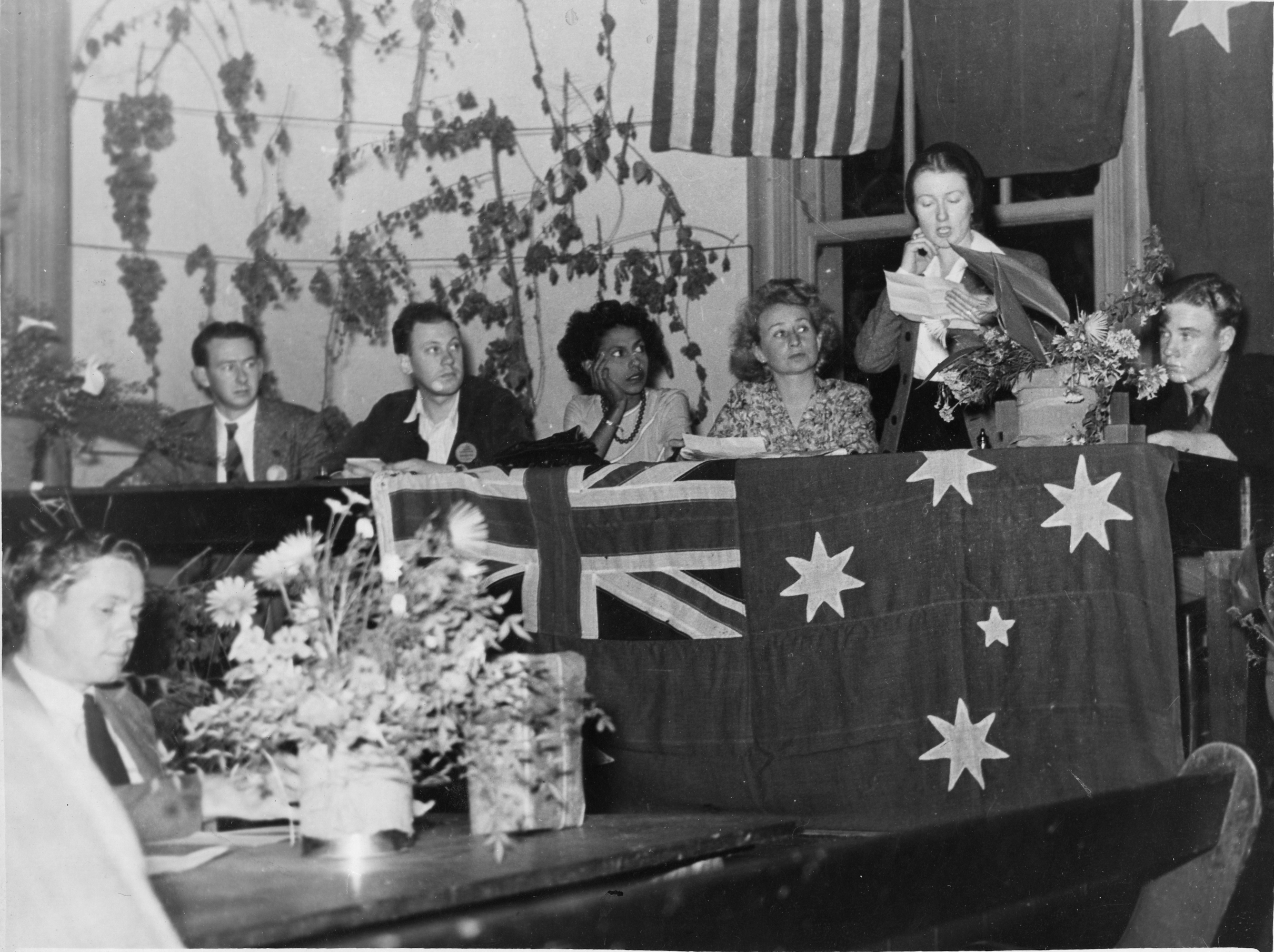
- Crawford addressing Youth Charter Conference in 1949
- Born: Pamela Mary Seeman; 1921; Brisbane, Australia
- Died: 5 May 1997 (aged 75–76)
- Occupations: Artist, stage designer
- Spouse: James Crawford

Pamela Mary Crawford (née Seeman, 1921–5 May 1997) was an Australian artist and stage designer married to the English-born Australian dramatist, James Crawford.

Crawford was involved in the radical art and literary movements of Brisbane's 1940s. She was a member of the Barjai group which published the radical youth art magazine Barjai. This magazine was edited by Barrett Reid and Laurence Collinson and published between 1943 and 1947. Barjai magazine described itself as 'a meeting place for youth'. Crawford was also involved in the establishment of the Miya Studio.

In 1988, she donated a large collection of artworks from the Miya Studio to the University of Queensland.

== Early life ==
Pamela Seeman was born in Brisbane in 1921. In 1942, Crawford entered the Central Technical College in George Street, Brisbane, as a full-time student. She had been unable to do so earlier due to a family illness. Once she completed the introductory course, she began studying fashion as theatrical design was not offered. Crawford later transferred into Industrial Drawing under John Appleyard. Crawford was still attending some classes in 1945; however, she left college before she was awarded her diploma.

== Career ==
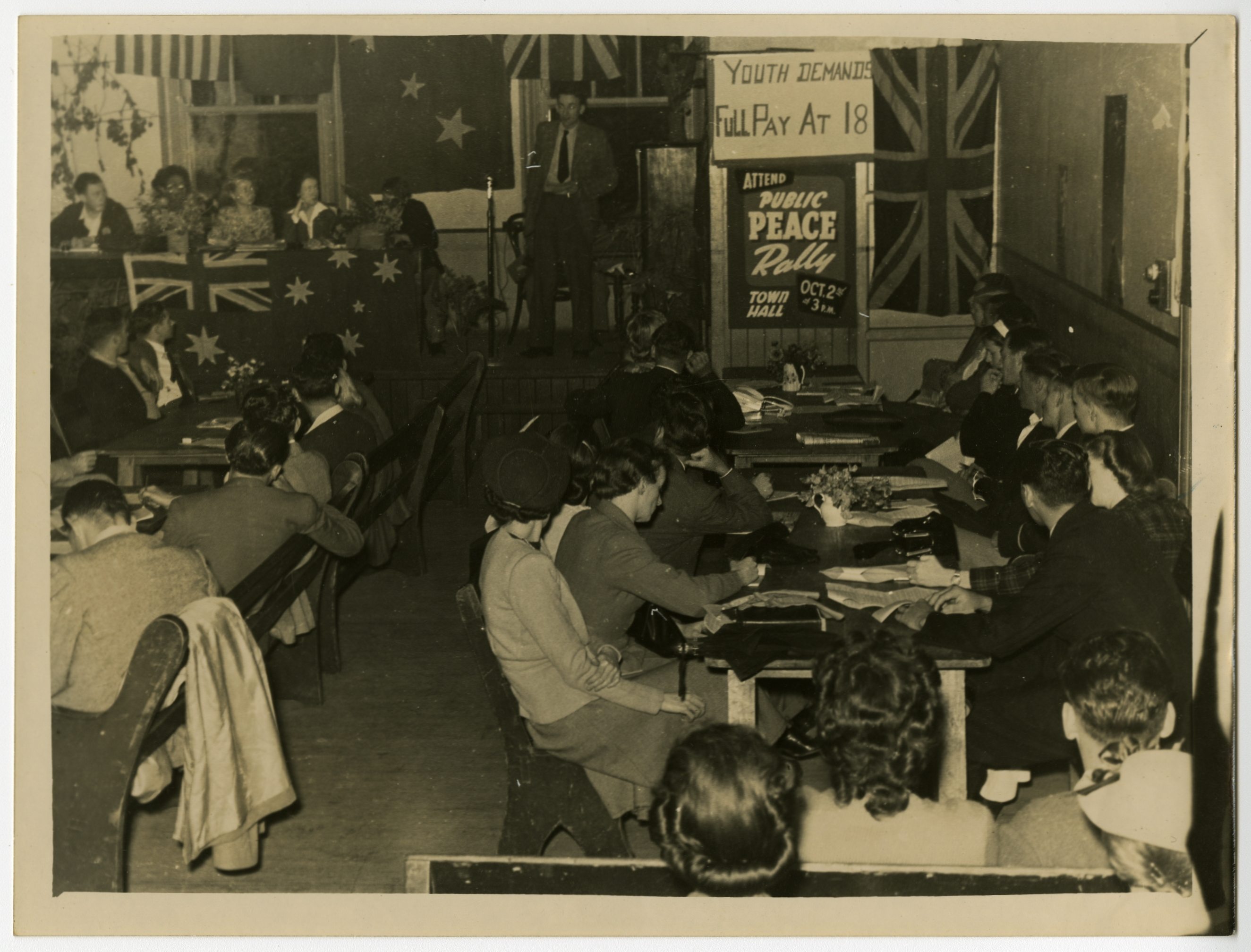
View across Youth Charter Conference. Delegates towards stage.

The Barjai magazine was created at Brisbane State High School by Barrett Reid, Laurence Collinson and Cecil Knopke in 1943. Barjai was the Aboriginal word for 'meeting place'. The aim of the Barjai was to allow adolescents to express themselves about experimental art and literature. However, Headmaster Waddle prohibited the newspaper from the school; Reid sold the Barjai on the path outside.

The magazine continued outside of school and by 1944, the Barjai group held fortnightly meetings in the Australasian Catholic Assurance building at Queen Street, Brisbane. By this stage the Barjai group had grown considerably. Writers included people like Thea Astley, Laurence Collinson, Barret Reid, Barbara Patterson (known as Blackman), Pat O'Rourke and Vida Smith (known as Horn). Artists, such as, Pamela Seeman, Joy Roggenkamp and Laurence Hope also joined the magazine. This group was further joined by associate writers, Judith Wright, James Devaney, Jack McKinney and Val Vallis. The Barjai had an audience of around three hundred people and more than fifty people contributed poetry, stories, essays and artworks.

The Miya Studio was formed in 1945 as a break-away from the more conservative Royal Queensland Art Society when the parent body disapproved of the direction of the Younger Artist's Group (YAG). Indeed, this group had been established by Crawford (then Seeman), Laurence Collinson, Joy Roggenkamp, Laurence Hope and Cecil Knopke. There was no government funding at that time for independent art schools and budding artists needed a studio to express their passion. The Miya studio was different from other artist groups as the artists painted with radical intent, rather than for a record of achievement. Crawford became the secretary-treasurer for the Miya Studio in March, 1946.

The Miya Studio operated between 1945 and 1949 and had grown out of the Barjai group. Studio members organised art exhibitions and other events, such as, public lectures held by emerging intellectuals and writers of the day. The first major exhibition was in 1946, held at the Banquet Hall of Hotel Canberra. The artworks from the exhibition included Crawford's paintings Ivory Tower and Shadow Partners. The Miya artists' style was loosely based on Expressionism. This style was highly advanced in the Brisbane art scene during this period. An art critic who had visited the exhibition stated that Crawford was one of the most promising artists in the show. Most critics, however, were dismissive of the modernist work of the group. Joanne Watson's brief history of the Barjai group, published in Overland (2004) records Crawford as saying: '"Most Modern art was regarded by the art establishment as an unlovely aberration that would go away if ignored." Her nude study, alongside Laurence Collinson's antiwar painting drew police attention at Finney's Gallery in 1948.'

In September 1949, Pamela Crawford spoke at the Youth Charter Conference held in Trades Hall, Brisbane. This conference was held to expose the enemies of the Youth in order to allow Youths to have a better life. One hundred and fifteen delegates from 47 organisations participated in the conference.

Crawford attended art classes of Caroline Barker and Miss Birkbeck whose studios were in Brisbane. However, these teachers were not progressive artists of the 1950s. Like many young Brisbane artists of the period, Crawford attended lectures held by Dr. Gertrude Langer. Langer, a Viennese art historian who had fled the rise of Nazism in Germany, had become influential in the development of the Arts in Queensland and was a central figure for Miya Studio artists. Langer also offered her support to the Barjai group. Crawford stated that she was educated on many topics during these lectures, such as, the Impressionists and the Fauves. Crawford's photographs appeared in edition twenty of the Barjai.

Barjai magazine and Miya studio members frequented the Pink Elephant Cafe which gained the reputation in Brisbane as a meeting place for the unruly. It was not uncommon for police raids to occur on the suspicion that alcohol trading was apparent.

In the late '40s, Crawford began spending a lot of time with a radical society called the New Theatre Club. Consequently, the Miya Studio began to merge with this radical club. The New Theatre Club stood for "Peace, Freedom and Cultural progress". This amalgamation was named the Artists group of the New Theatre, which formally constituted in June, 1949. The Miya Studio group officially ended in 1950. Crawford was elected the first chairman of the new art society. Through this association, Crawford began stage designing and in 1952, she illustrated costume sketches for Jim Crawford's play the Bushland Picnic.

== Personal life ==
Crawford married the playwright and Communist Party member, James Crawford (Jim) on 22 December 1949. Crawford was influenced by Jim's political philosophy and may also have become a member of the Communist Party. The marriage inspired her to unite her artistic and theatrical passions.

The couple settled on Tamborine Mountain after buying several acres of land.

== Later years and death ==
Crawford became a member of the Queensland Women's Historical Association in 1977. The association was founded in 1950 with the mission to preserve historical sites around Queensland, Northern New South Wales, France and Great Britain. One of the historical sites that the association worked towards saving was Meigunyah house, Brisbane, built in 1886.

In 1988, Crawford donated a series of artworks (including around fifty of her own works) from the Miya Studio to the University of Queensland. This series of artworks allowed the University of Queensland to hold an exhibition dedicated to the young Brisbane artists who lived during the 1940s. This exhibition, titled "Young Turks and Battle Lines", was the first exhibition to explore this aspect of the city's cultural history.

Crawford died on 5 May 1997.
