= Jim Crawford =

Jim or Jimmy Crawford may refer to:

== Entertainment ==
- Jimmy Crawford (drummer) (1910–1980), American jazz drummer of the swing era
- Jimmy Crawford (British singer) (1937–2024), British pop singer in the 1960s
- Jimmy Crawford (Home and Away), a fictional character on the Australian soap opera Home and Away
- Jim Stormdancer né Crawford, developer of Frog Fractions

== Sports ==
- Jim Crawford (American football) (1935–2018), American football player for the Boston Patriots
- Jim Crawford (baseball) (born 1950), former baseball player
- Jim Crawford (footballer) (born 1973), Irish footballer
- Jim Crawford (racing driver) (1948–2002), Scottish auto racing driver
- Jim Crawford (runner), American track athlete and medalist in athletics at the 1971 Pan American Games
- Jimmy Crawford (racing driver) (1944–2007), NASCAR Cup Series driver
- Jim Crawford (sprinter), winner of the 1974 distance medley relay at the NCAA Division I Indoor Track and Field Championships

== Others ==
- James W. Crawford Jr. (born 1937), known as Jim, Democratic member of the North Carolina General Assembly
- Jim Crawford (playwright) (1908–1973), Australian playwright and journalist

== See also ==
- James Crawford (disambiguation)
