= Church of Our Lady of Victories, Bowen Hills =

Our Lady of Victories Church
- Church of Our Lady of Victories
- White Temple of Peace
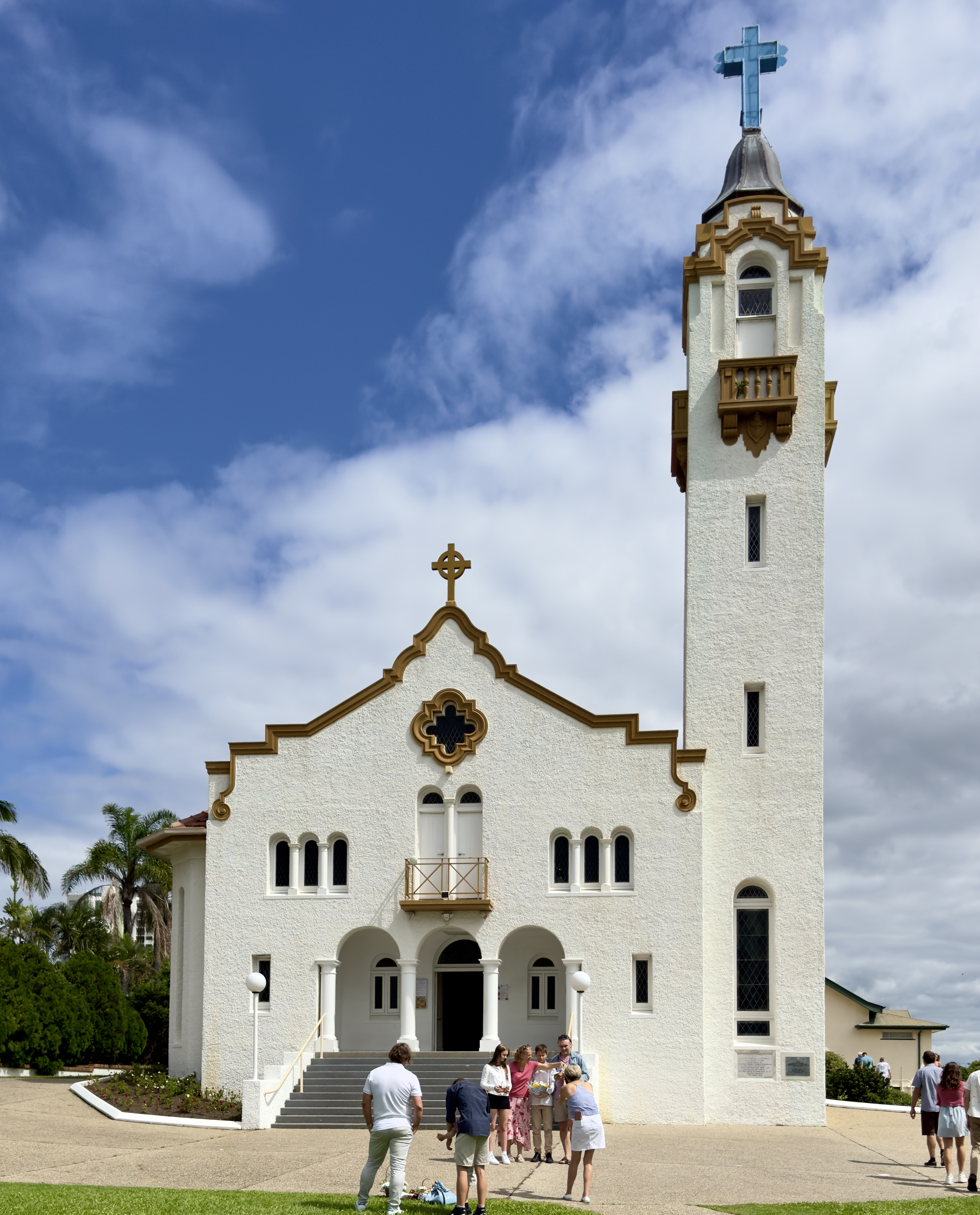
- Our Lady of Victories Church, 2013
- Our Lady of Victories Church
- 27°26′46″S 153°02′26″E
- Address: 29 Cintra Road, Bowen Hills, City of Brisbane, Queensland
- Country: Australia
- Denomination: Roman Catholic
- Website: bowenhillsparish.org.au

History
- Status: Church
- Founded: 24 August 1919
- Founder(s): Apostolic Delegate, Bishop Bartolomeo Cattaneo
- Dedication: In memory of the Queensland Catholic Sailors and Soldiers who fought and died in World War I
- Consecrated: 26 April 1925 by Archbishop James Duhig

Architecture
- Functional status: Active
- Architect: Hall & Prentice
- Architectural type: Church
- Style: Spanish Mission
- Years built: 1919–1962
- Construction cost: £9435

Specifications
- Materials: Reinforced concrete

Administration
- Archdiocese: Brisbane
- Parish: Bowen Hills

Clergy
- Priest(s): Fr Grzegorz Gawel, S.Chr.

Queensland Heritage Register
- Official name: Our Lady of Victories Catholic Church, White Temple of Peace
- Type: State heritage (built)
- Designated: 11 November 1996
- Reference no.: 601585
- Significant period: 1910s–1920s, 1950s (historical); 1920s, 1960s (fabric) ongoing (social)
- Significant components: Tower, views from, confessional, church, stained glass window/s, views to, shrine, furniture/fittings

Our Lady of Victories Church is a heritage-listed Roman Catholic war memorial church at 29 Cintra Road, Bowen Hills, City of Brisbane, Queensland, Australia. It was designed by Hall & Prentice and built from 1919 to 1962. It is also known as White Temple of Peace. It was added to the Queensland Heritage Register on 11 November 1996.

== History ==
Our Lady of Victories Church was constructed by the Roman Catholic Archdiocese of Brisbane in 1924–25 as a Memorial to Roman Catholic soldiers and sailors who fell during World War I. The church was designed by prolific Brisbane architects Messrs Thomas Ramsay Hall and George Gray Prentice.

Our Lady of Victories was the first church built for the newly created Bowen Hills parish during a period of unprecedented growth in building stock of the Roman Catholic Church in Queensland after James Duhig was appointed as archbishop in 1917. Duhig had served as coadjutor archbishop to his aging predecessor, Archbishop Robert Dunne since 1912, and it was from this time that Duhig planned immense growth within the church. This growth was manifest by the large number of churches, schools, convents and presbyteries built increasing the church's presence in Queensland. In the 16 years between 1912 and 1928 over 100 Roman Catholic churches were constructed in the Brisbane Archdiocese.

In November 1917 Duhig purchased part of an old estate known as Folkstone belonging to William Perry. In 1866 Perry bought the property which contained an early 1860s timber bungalow thought to have been built for a Mr Keand. The property initially belonged to James Gibbon who acquired a deed of grant from the New South Wales Government over the land in 1857. After acquisition by the Perry family numerous changes were made to the bungalow, and it was given the name Folkstone. The Perry family were well known in Brisbane as ironmongers since 1860 and a building, Perry House, at the corner of Albert and Elizabeth Streets in Brisbane still bears the family name. In about 1912 the bungalow was destroyed by fire and subsequently the block was sub-divided, allowing the Archbishop to purchase the land and propose the construction of a church in the newly created parish.

The foundation stone for the memorial church was laid on 24 August 1919 by the Apostolic Delegate, Bishop Bartolomeo Cattaneo "to the Glory of God and in memory of the Catholic Sailors and Soldiers of Queensland who fought and died in the Great European War 1914–1919". A publication detailing the development of the Catholic Church in Queensland, Catholic Progress 1912–1919, contained a lengthy article on the Soldiers Memorial Church at Bowen Hills then in planning stages. The article was illustrated with plans and elevations of a large brick and cement Gothic church featuring an enormous tower and spire extending some 38 metres (124 ft). The plans were drawn by Messrs Hall and Prentice. The reason for the alteration in building design is unknown; though obviously the Spanish mission building constructed was much less expensive than the elaborate and massive building initially intended for the site.

The church which was eventually blessed and opened on 26 April 1925 by Archbishop Duhig was constructed by H. Cheetham costing £9435, which included £400 for the architects, Messrs Hall and Prentice. The church, called Our Lady of Victories Church, was designed in a manner incorporating many Spanish mission elements, a style of influence and popularity in Australia during the inter-war period. Popularised by movies from Hollywood during the 1920s and 1930s, the Spanish mission style was inspired by picturesque Californian Spanish missions. Many of the external details on the Bowen Hills church suggest a strong influence of this style, most obviously in the baroque parapeted gables, groups of round-headed arched openings, textured stucco render and several semi-octagonal projections. The interior of the church does not exhibit the strong stylistic intention apparent externally.

Hall and Prentice formed when TR Hall formed a partnership with GG Prentice in 1919. The partnership was responsible for several notable examples of Spanish mission inspired architecture in south-east Queensland. Examples include two bathing pavilions (1934) and a surf life saving club (1936) at Southport and Breffney, a large house in Clayfield (1929). The Spanish mission style was used for other Queensland churches, thought to be an appropriate style for sub-tropical weather and an appropriate use of what was an ecclesiastical inspired style. Churches with Spanish Mission features include St Peters Roman Catholic Church in Rockhampton (c. 1937); Our Lady of the Chain Roman Catholic Church, Mareeba (1936) designed by VM Brown; Holy Trinity Church at Woolloongabba (1930) designed by Chambers and Ford and St Anne's at Kalinga, designed in 1934 by Hennessey and Hennessey.

When the church was opened, Our Lady of Victories was regarded as unique. The report in a local Catholic newspaper, The Age, regarded "its mission type of architecture...the first of its kind in Australia". The report continued on to describe the large electrically illuminated cross which surmounted the tower, as a perpetual light commemorating the armed forces of World War I. Many other details in the church manifested its intention as the principal Roman Catholic war memorial in Brisbane; the coloured glass panels depicting the First Australian Imperial Force (AIF) symbol of the rising sun; and an honour roll at the base of the tower (since removed).

The first parish priest appointed to Bowen Hills was Reverend Father ES Barry, a former Armed Forces chaplain. In 1920 land, also part of the Perry Estate, was purchased adjacent to the church block by James Duhig for the construction of a presbytery. A school was constructed to the north west of the church, the foundations stone for which was laid on 18 September 1921 by Duhig.

It is suggested that the Bowen Hills parish was never particularly large and this was a principal reason explaining why Archbishop Duhig handed the church and parish over to the Polish Community in Brisbane in 1955. In October of that year Franciscan Brothers of the Capuchin Order in Australia were appointed to the parish of Bowen Hills and undertook to provide services in both English and Polish, a tradition which continues in 1996.

The Polish community remains at the church and has made very little changes to the building fabric. A shrine to Our Lady of Czestochowa was erected near the altar in 1962 to commemorate 1000 years of Christianity in Poland (966–1966). A memorial plaque was attached to the eastern facade of the building in 1980 to honour the "memory of 14 000 Polish Prisoners of War massacred by Soviet Forces at Katyn and elsewhere in USSR in 1940." Another cairn memorial was moved recently from the Polish Community Centre in Capalaba to the southern side of the building, commemorating Polish soldiers who fought during World War.

== Description ==
Our Lady of Victories Catholic Church is sited near the apex of Bowen Hill, overlooking the Brisbane River. It is on a large site incorporating a presbytery to the east and a school and scout hall to the west. The church addresses both Roche and Boyd Streets.

The building is essentially rectangular in plan, running east–west, with shallow transepts toward the western end of the north and south facades. Semi-octagonal recesses are found as small entrance vestibules on the transept ends, as the sanctuary and vestry of the church, as altar recesses in the side chapels flanking the principal altar and in a baptistry toward the eastern end of the southern facade. The burnt-orange terracotta-tiled roof is generally gabled with hips to the polygonal projections. The building is constructed from re-inforced concrete the exterior is rendered with textured stucco, except to mouldings which are smoothly rendered.

Dominating the building visually is a large square planned tower abutting the eastern end of the northern facade. The tower, which extends for 27 metres (90 ft) has long narrow rectangular openings on its shaft and shallow balcony-like sections of concreted balustrading supported on decorative moulded corbels. These balconies are found on each of the four sides and are accessible by door openings on the top level of the tower. Heavy mouldings define the upper limits of the tower above which is a bell shaped cupola roof clad with copper sheeting and surmounted by an illuminated Latin cross.

The principal eastern facade faces the Brisbane River, looking toward the bend where the Bulimba and Hamilton Reaches converge. The elevation is symmetrically composed and defined by a decorative parapeted gabled, where a moulded capping follows the curves and notches of a Cape Dutch gable outline. Featured on the elevation are several groups of round headed arched openings; a porch/loggia is formed by a recess separated from a wide concrete stairway by an arcade of three arched openings supported on large cast iron columns; centrally located on the facade above this is a doubled arched opening with a lightly framed Juliet balcony flanked by groups of three arched window openings. Centrally placed near the apex of the parapet is a large diamond mullioned "rose" window. Surmounting the apex of the gable is a masonry Latin cross.

The north and south facades have five evenly spaced round headed arched openings separated by shallow smoothly rendered pilasters. The windows are composed from two strips of four top-hinged hoppers filled with diamond mullioned glass, above which is placed a semi circular window glazed with a leadlight panel depicting a rising sun. The transepts of the church, on the north and south facades feature similar, but smaller, versions of the eastern parapeted gable. Doorways are formed in the semi-octagonal recesses centrally located on the transepts. Long round-headed arched openings are found on the octagonal projection and flanking this, on the face of the transept end.

The western facade has two parapeted gable walls, one slightly smaller in front of a larger version, defining the chancel space. The smaller gabled wall is abutted by a single storeyed semi-octagonal projection housing the vestry.

The porch on the eastern facade houses a recessed porch and the walls of the porch have been smooth rendered and scribed with ashlar stonework joints. The double entrance door of timber is surmounted by a semi-circular fan light of leadlight depicting the rising sun and cross.

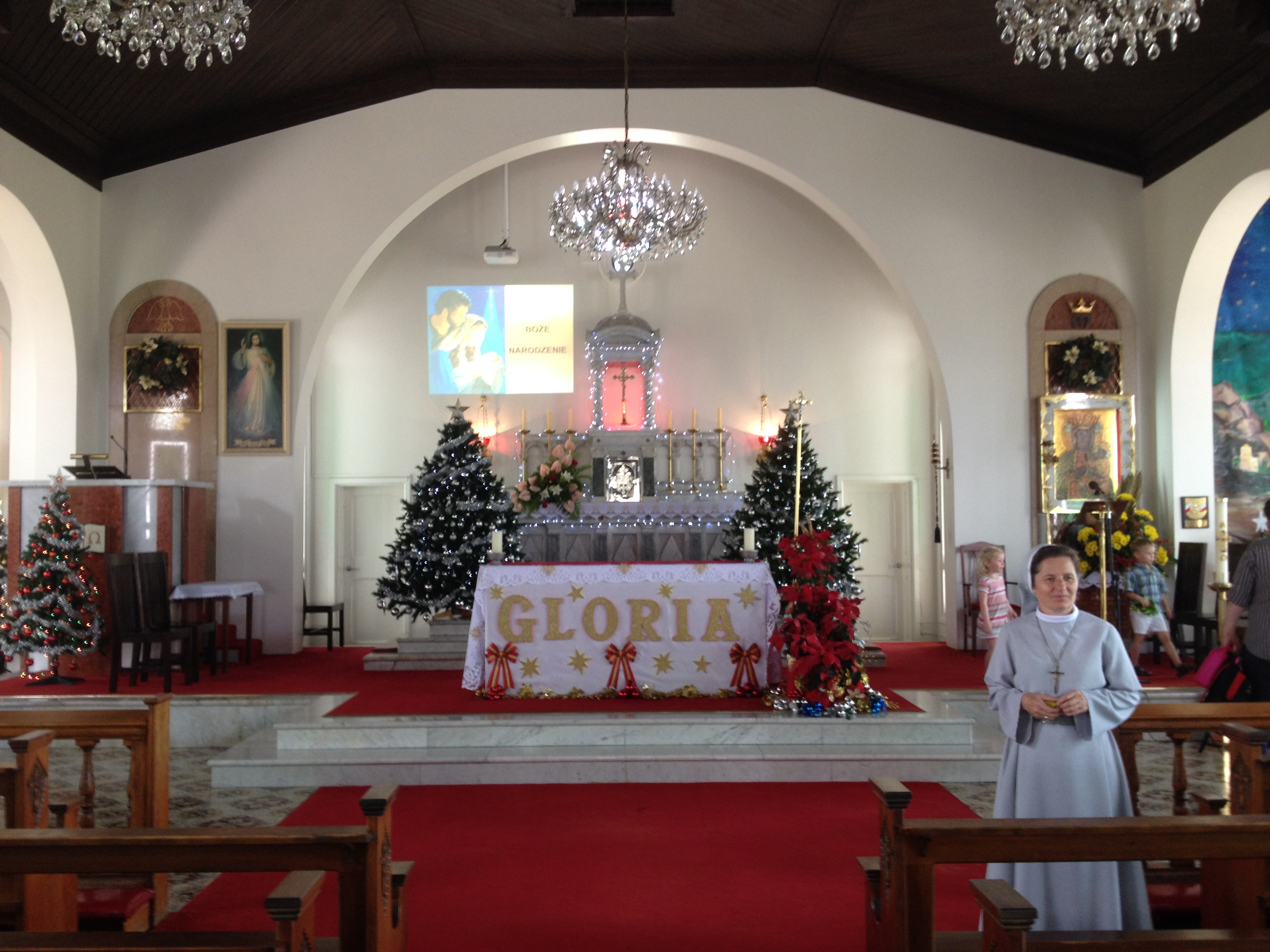
Timber pews facing the altar, 2013

Internally, the church does not reflect the Spanish mission dictum influencing the design of the exterior. The interior has a concrete floor with sections of ceramic tile and carpeting added more recently, the internal walls are plaster rendered. The ceiling, which is diagonally timber boarded in alternating sections, rakes downward on the long sides of the building. The internal layout is very simple, with timber pews facing toward an altar area comprising a low marble platform on which a marble altar table. Behind this in the chancel with a marble high altar. The shallow chancel is side lit by long round-headed arched windows, and separated from the body of the church by a large round headed arched opening and smaller double arched openings separating the transepts.

To the north and south of the entrance doors are two small rooms, the southern one a former baptistery and to the north the base of the tower. Inside the tower is a steep open tread timber stair which leads to a top floor where four door openings give access to shallow balconies. The timber stair also gives access to a gallery, supported on cast iron columns, which lines the eastern, rear face of the interior of the Church. Provision is given off the gallery for access to the small Juliet balcony on the eastern facade of the building.

The arched window openings which line the north and south walls of the church are housed in arched recesses, in the spandrels of which sit the corbelled supports of the timber ceiling joists. The windows are glazed with diamond mullioned glass in varying shades of blue and green forming geometric patterns.

Notable fittings in the church include the marble high altar, confessional boxes, stations of the cross, a shrine to Our Lady of Czestochowa and statues in the side altar recesses. The high altar is of white marble with green marble detailing and is centrally placed within the chancel below a "rose" window glazed with coloured glass depicting a crown and cross within a circle surmounted by a fleur-di-lis. Two timber confessional boxes are found at the rear of the church. These are separated into three small rooms with a small perforated timber panel with sliding closing panel in the two internal connecting walls. The timber framed stations of the cross are surmounted by a broken pedimented entablature similar to those which surmount the two confessional boxes.

== Heritage listing ==
Our Lady of Victories Catholic Church was listed on the Queensland Heritage Register on 11 November 1996 having satisfied the following criteria.

The place is important in demonstrating the evolution or pattern of Queensland's history.

Our Lady of Victories Church demonstrates the Catholic ethos of utilising prominent Brisbane sites with landmark buildings in a time of Church expansion during the early tenure of Archbishop Duhig who sought to increase the presence of the Catholic Church in Brisbane. The church is a memorial to Catholic soldiers and sailors and demonstrates the widespread construction of memorials after World War I. The building, which has been managed by the Polish community in Brisbane for many years, also demonstrates the influx of European migrants after the Second World War.

The place demonstrates rare, uncommon or endangered aspects of Queensland's cultural heritage.

The building is a rare example of a Catholic church built as a war memorial to World War I. Many features of the church reflect this initial purpose including glazing, memorial plaques and an illuminated cross surmounting the tower.

The place is important in demonstrating the principal characteristics of a particular class of cultural places.

The building is an example of a Catholic church built during the "golden years" of the church in Brisbane as a prominent landmark, designed with in the stylistic canon of Spanish Mission architecture.

The place is important because of its aesthetic significance.

Our Lady of Victories Church has aesthetic value; it is a well composed building with Spanish mission elements which contribute to its picturesqueness. It is a prominently sited landmark in Brisbane.

The place has a strong or special association with a particular community or cultural group for social, cultural or spiritual reasons.

The building, which has been managed by the Polish community in Brisbane for many years, also demonstrates the influx of European migrants after the Second World War.

The Church has strong associations with the Catholic Church community in Brisbane, particularly Polish Catholics who have managed the building for about 40 years.

The place has a special association with the life or work of a particular person, group or organisation of importance in Queensland's history.

Our Lady of Victories Church demonstrates the Catholic ethos of utilising prominent Brisbane sites with landmark buildings in a time of Church expansion during the early tenure of Archbishop Duhig who sought to increase the presence of the Catholic Church in Brisbane. The church is a memorial to Catholic soldiers and sailors and demonstrates the widespread construction of memorials after World War I.

The church is strongly associated with Archbishop Duhig, who bought the site initially and planned the construction of a church in the newly created Bowen Hills parish.
