= Miegunyah =

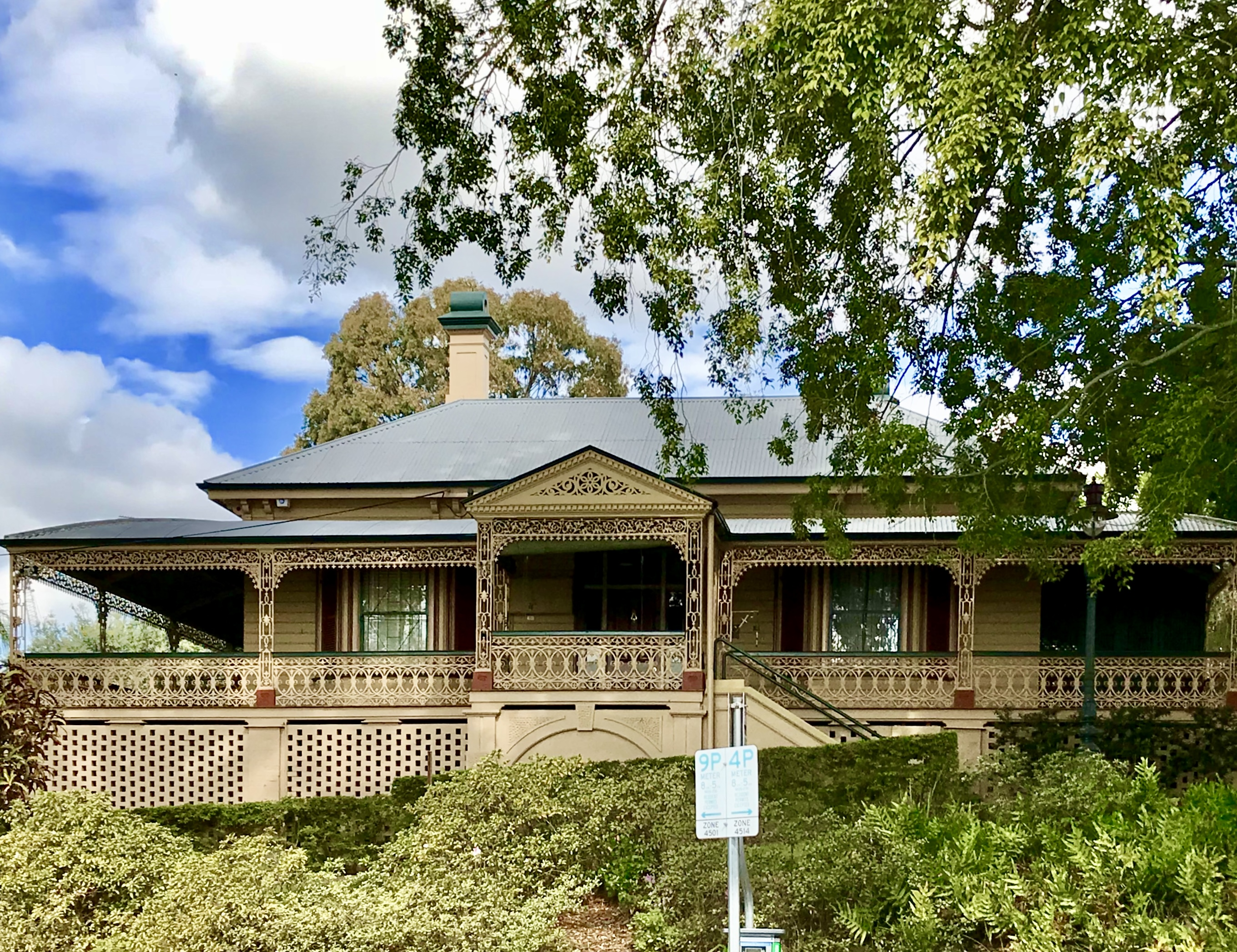
- Miegunyah, 2014

- Location within Queensland Location within Australia
- 27.4455°S 153.0414°E
- Location: 35 Jordan Terrace, Bowen Hills, Queensland, Australia

History
- Design period: 1870s–1890s (late 19th century)
- Built: c. 1885

Queensland Heritage Register
- Official name: Miegunyah, Beverley Wood
- Type: state heritage (landscape, built)
- Designated: 21 October 1992
- Reference no.: 600055
- Significant period: 1885–
- Significant components: residential accommodation – main house, garden/grounds, stables

Miegunyah is a heritage-listed detached house at 35 Jordan Terrace, Bowen Hills, Queensland, Australia. It was built c. 1885. It was also known as Beverley Wood. It was added to the Queensland Heritage Register on 21 October 1992. It is now home to the Queensland Women’s Historical Association and operated as a late 19th century period historic house museum.

== History ==
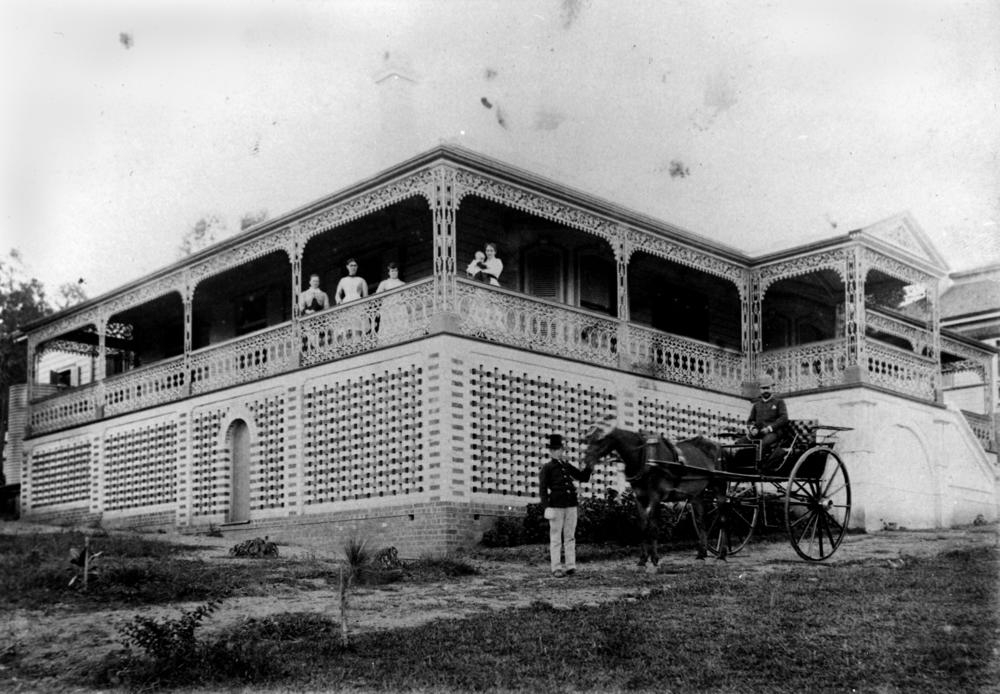
Verandahs at Miegunyah, 1886

This single-storeyed timber residence was built around 1885 on land owned by William Perry, a successful ironmonger and merchant who lived at nearby Folkestone. Perry had bought the land in 1875, and the house was occupied by his adult sons Herbert and George who built the business premises Perry House in the Brisbane CBD. Herbert's wife was Leila Elizabeth Markwell, grand-daughter of George Edmondstone.

Leila Perry died in 1920 and Herbert Perry died in 1922. Miegunyah remained in the Perry family until 1926.

During World War II, the house was requisitioned by the Australian Government. It was used by the Z Special Unit as they prepared and debriefed from Operation Jaywick, an attack on Japanese ships in Singapore Harbour in 1943.

There were several changes of ownership through to 1966. The house was saved from demolition by the Queensland Women's Historical Association, who by 1967 had raised sufficient funds to acquire the building. They refurbished the house and later opened it as a house museum dedicated to the pioneer women of Queensland. The interior has been partly returned to its original layout and colour scheme.

== Description ==
Miegunyah is a single-storeyed timber house (c.1885) surrounded by a verandah with cast-iron balusters, wide filigree posts and valances. Bay windows at the front do not extend to the hipped roof, which is in corrugated iron.

Entry is via a projecting gabled portico with a fretwork pediment. The house is highset at the front with brick piers and honeycomb brick infill. The stairs and portico base are in solid masonry ornamented in classic detail including arches with keystones.

The exterior of the timber stables at the rear has been conserved while the interior has been altered to provide caretaker accommodation.

== Heritage listing ==
Miegunyah was listed on the Queensland Heritage Register on 21 October 1992 having satisfied the following criteria.

The place is important in demonstrating the evolution or pattern of Queensland's history.

Miegunyah demonstrates the principal characteristics of a substantial single storeyed 1880s residence, including stables and garden. The fine quality of the residence exhibits particular aesthetic characteristics valued by the community.

Miegunyah is significant for the association between the building and the Perry family, prominent Brisbane merchants and also with the work of the Queensland Women's Historical Association.

The place is important in demonstrating the principal characteristics of a particular class of cultural places.

Miegunyah demonstrates the principal characteristics of a substantial single storeyed 1880s residence, including stables and garden.

The place is important because of its aesthetic significance.

The fine quality of the residence exhibits particular aesthetic characteristics valued by the community.

The place has a special association with the life or work of a particular person, group or organisation of importance in Queensland's history.

Miegunyah is significant for the association between the building and the Perry family, prominent Brisbane merchants and also with the work of the Queensland Women's Historical Association.
