= Queensland Women's Historical Association =

Historical society in Brisbane, Australia

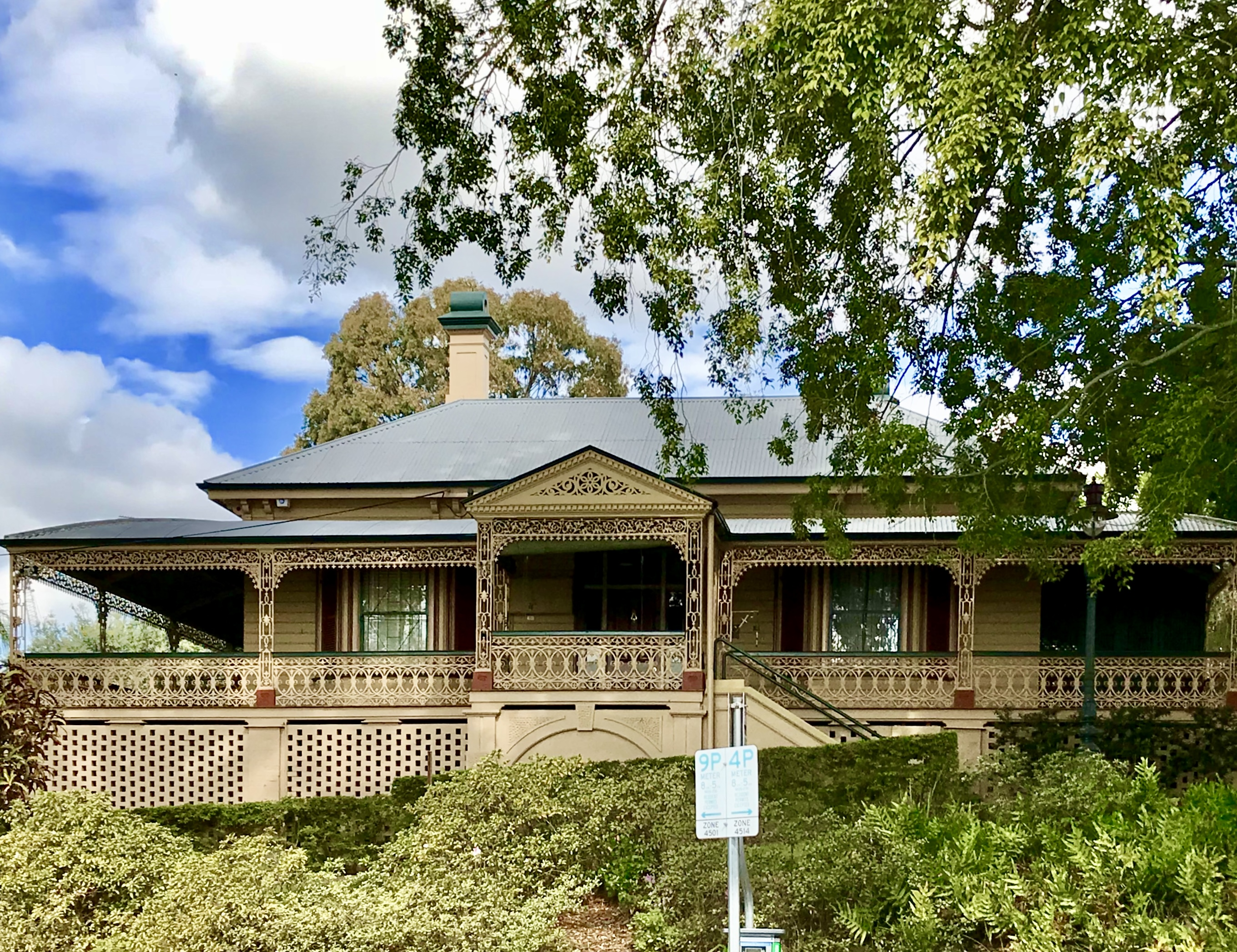
Miegunyah House in Bowen Hills, Queensland

The Queensland Women's Historical Association is a historical society in Brisbane, Queensland, Australia which studies the history and heritage of Queensland, including its pioneer families and the contribution made by women. The Association is headquartered at the heritage-listed house Miegunyah in Bowen Hills.

== History ==
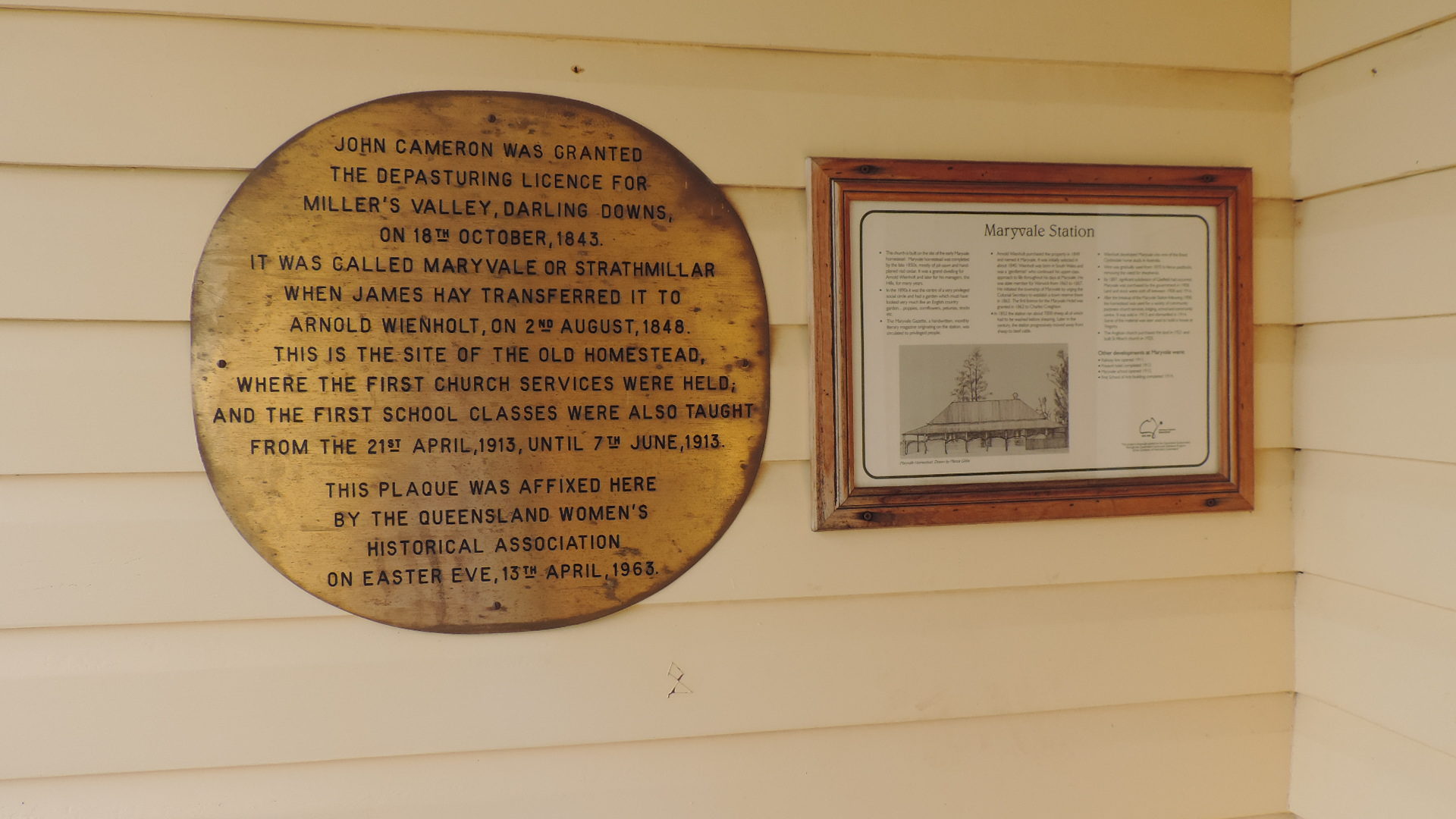
Plaque placed by the QWHA at St Alban's Anglican Church, Maryvale in 1963

The association was established in Brisbane in April 1950 as the Women's Historical Association. Its headquarters were at the heritage-listed Newstead House. In 1957 it was renamed the Queensland Women's Historical Association. From 1960 to 1983 the Association placed plaques to commemorate historic sites associated with Queensland's history.

In 1966, Newstead House was to be converted into a museum so the Association required new headquarters. At the same time, a nearby historic house Miegunyah (then called Beverley Wood) in Bowen Hills was about to be demolished. Through an appeal to members, the Association raised the funds for a deposit to buy Miegunyah to restore it to its former glory, and to fulfil the goal to have a Folk Museum dedicated to the pioneer women of Queensland and to display their collection of Queensland artefacts.

== Current activities ==
The Association continues to restore and maintain Miegunyah, which is open to the public as a museum and a venue for talks, exhibitions and social events. The Association maintains a library and archive and publishes books.

== Plaques ==
Some of the plaques placed by the QWHA include:

- the monument at Lake Moogerah to the women of the Fassifern District
- the Cactoblastis Memorial beside Myall Creek, Dalby commemorating the introduction of the Cactoblastis insect that helped eradicate the highly invasive prickly pear from Queensland farmland

== Collection policy ==
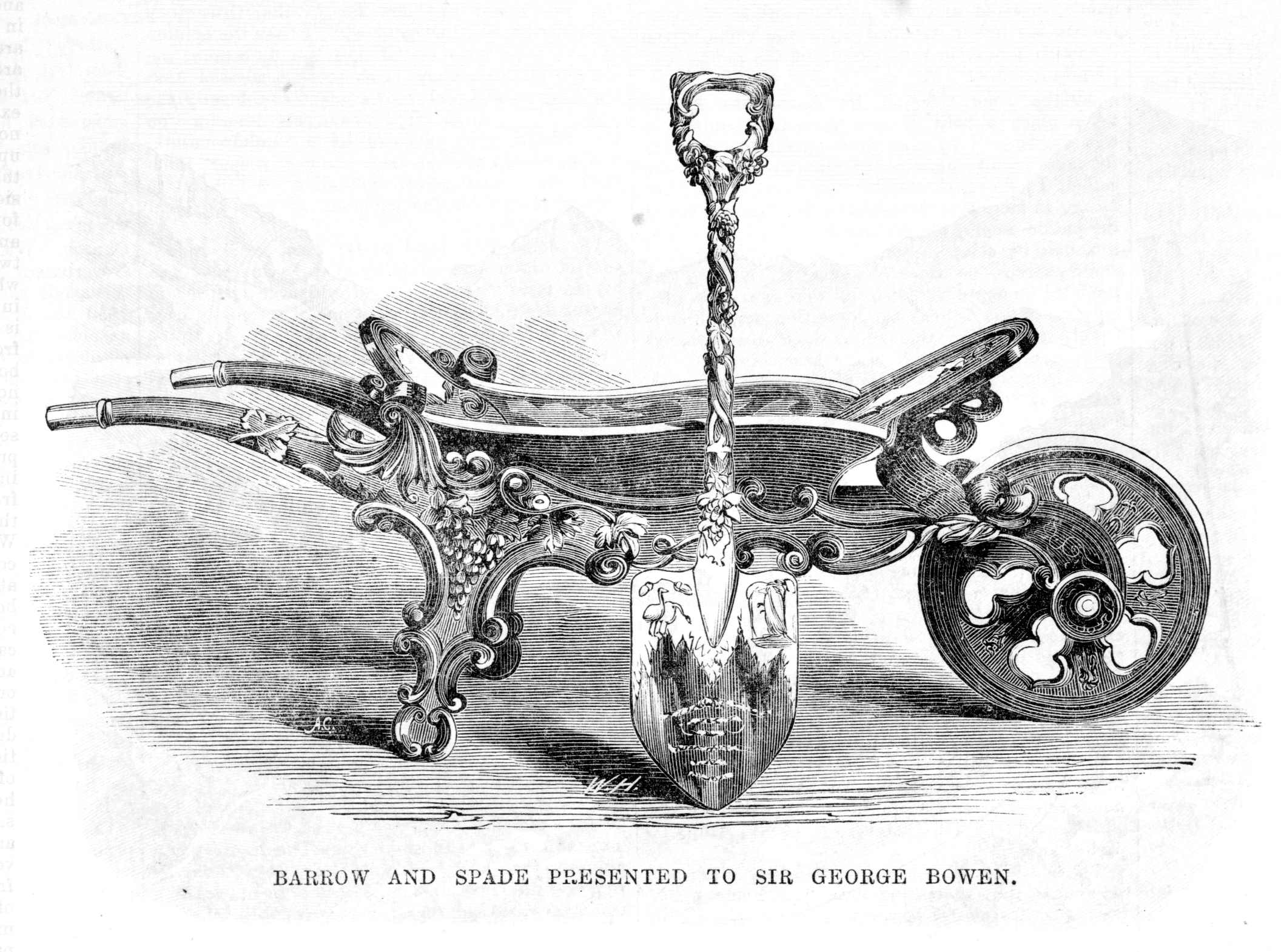
Barrow and silver spade presented to Sir George Bowen, 1865

In the absence of a well-defined collection policy, over the years the Association acquired via donations a number of items in its collection that did not fit its primary mission to collect and preserve women's history, often to save precious artefacts which might otherwise have been lost in the absence of other collecting organisations. Following the establishment of a collection policy and a review of the collection in 2016, it was decided some original items should be donated to more appropriate collections.

In 1964, Roma Browne, granddaughter of the first Queensland Governor, George Bowen, donated a silver spade to the QWHA. Bowen had used this spade to turn the first sod of the Queensland Northern Railway at Rockhampton on 27 September 1865 and had been presented with the spade as a souvenir of the occasion. In 2018, the Association donated it to the State Library of Queensland.

Also in 1964, Mrs Vernon Alford donated a parian ware vase to the Association. It is believed to be a favourite wedding present of Mrs Louis Hope of Ormiston House. In 2018, it was donated to the Ormiston House Museum.

== Published works ==
Published works of the Association include:

- Queensland Women's Historical Association (1970), A history of Kangaroo Point, Queensland Women's Historical Association
- Queensland Women's Historical Association (1998), Body, mind and soul : recalling the unsung carers of the community : the bush nurses, teachers and pastoral workers, Queensland Women's Historical Association, ISBN 978-0-9590271-7-4
- Cazalar, Lorraine; Queensland Women's Historical Association (2010), A family, their business, their houses : the Perry family of Brisbane, Queensland Women's Historical Association Inc, ISBN 978-0-9578228-2-5
- Queensland Women's Historical Association (2010), The Matildas : short biographies of Queensland women past and present, The Queensland Women's Historical Association, ISBN 978-0-9578228-3-2
- Hacker, D. R. (Diana R.); Spinaze, M. P. (Murray P.); Queensland Women's Historical Association (2012), A place, a purpose and a plaque : pioneer sites of Brisbane, Queensland and overseas, Queensland Women's Historical Association, ISBN 978-0-9578228-5-6
