= James Crawford (Burnley footballer) =

Scottish footballer

Personal information
- Full name: James Crawford
- Place of birth: Stirling, Scotland
- Position: Centre forward

Senior career*
Years	Team	Apps	(Gls)
1902–1904	Burnley	45	(4)
- * Club domestic league appearances and goals

James Crawford was a Scottish professional footballer, who played as a centre forward for Burnley in the early 1900s. He served in the Royal Navy during the First World War and he was aboard HMS Majestic when it sank, killing him.
