= William Perry (Queensland businessman) =

Australian politician

The Hon William Perry
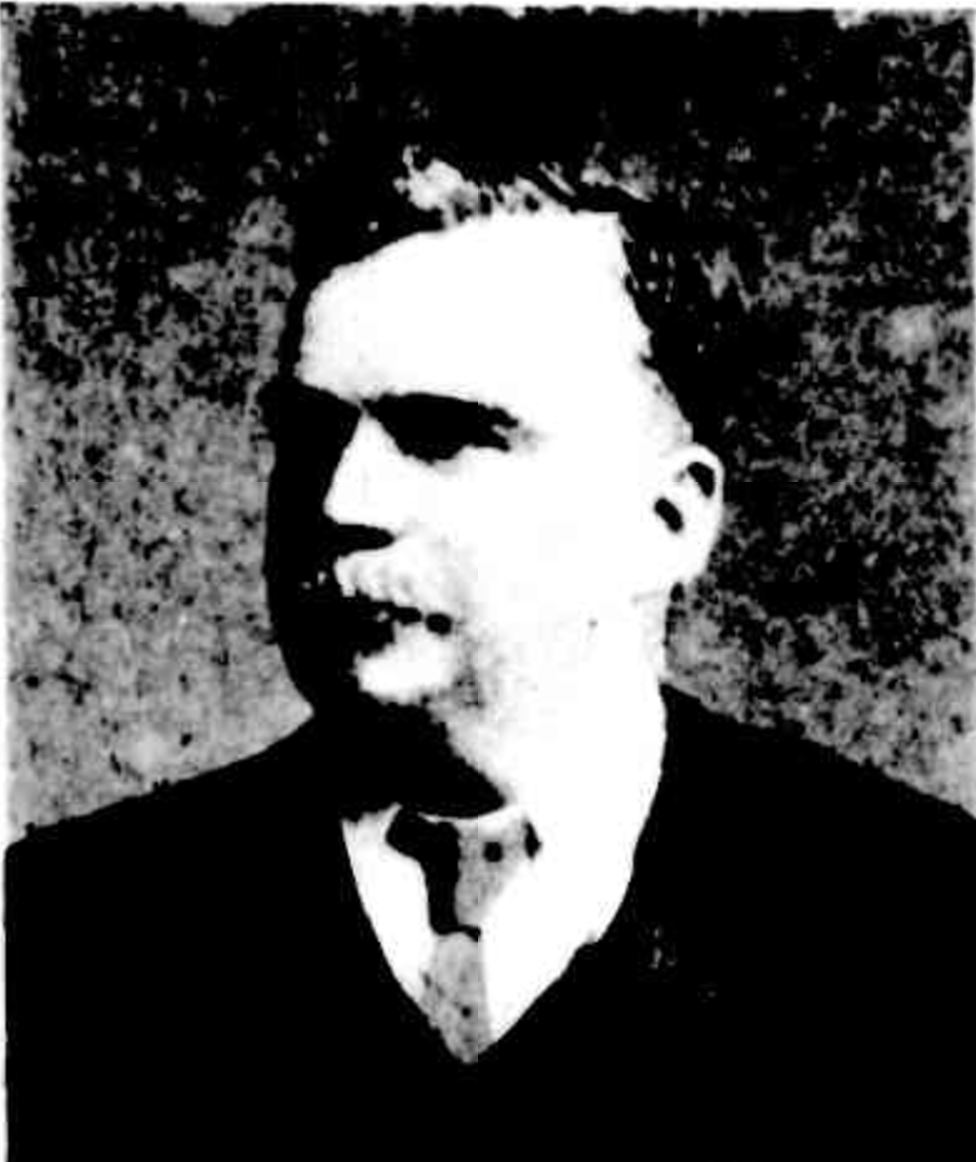

Member of the Queensland Legislative Council
- In office 22 September 1890 – 11 June 1891

Personal details
- Born: William Perry; 9 August 1835 Sydney, New South Wales, Australia
- Died: 11 June 1891 (aged 55) Brisbane, Queensland, Australia
- Resting place: Toowong Cemetery
- Spouse: Anne Harcourt (d.1917)
- Occupation: Ironmonger, Company director

William Perry (1835–1891) was a business man and politician in Brisbane, Queensland, Australia. He was a Member of the Queensland Legislative Council.

== Early life ==
William Perry was born in 1835 in Sydney, New South Wales, the son of William and Louisa (née Dodd).

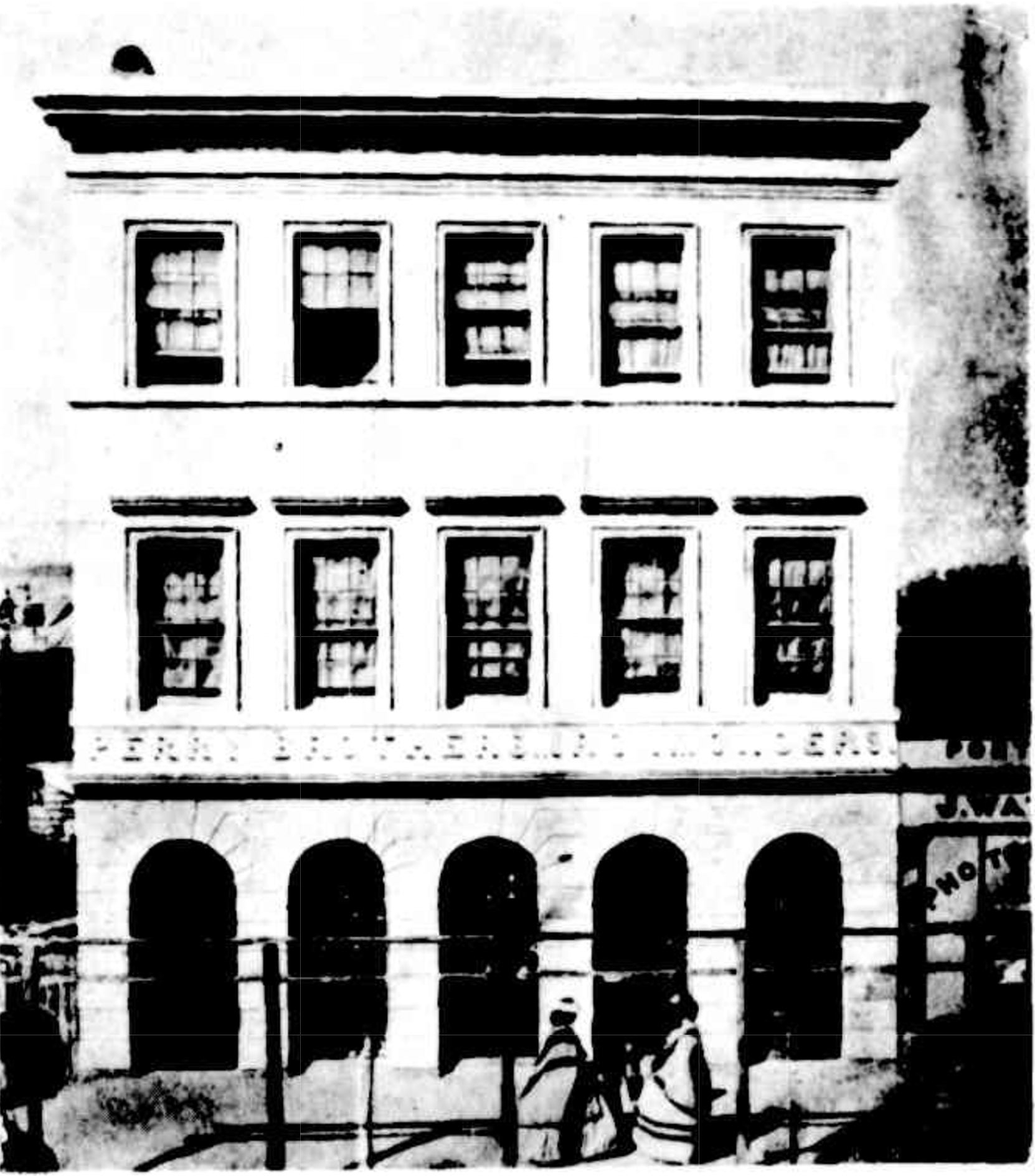
Original Perry Brothers store, Queen Street, circa 1860

== Business life ==
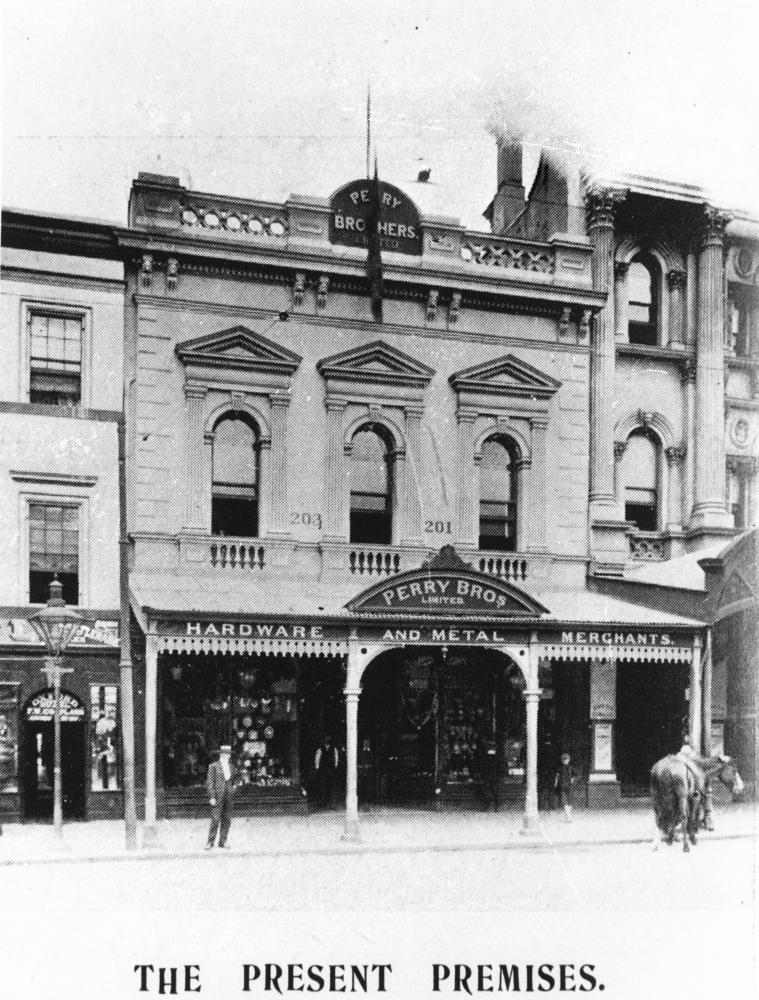
Perry Brothers Ltd, Queen Street, 1906, the previous 1860s building is immediately to the left

In June 1860, William Perry moved to Brisbane with his brother George to establish a hardware business; their brother Frederick later joined them. In August 1860, the Perry Brothers opened their business in Queen Street (where the Wintergarden Centre is in 2014). Business was successful and in 1865 they built new premises next door which they later extended back to Elizabeth Street. In 1876 his brother in law, Henry James Harcourt (1820–1909), also an Iron Monger, helped the business and "between the death of the late Mr. W Perry and the advent of his sons into the firm acted in a very responsible way in the business". His sister-in-law was married to Thomas Peate, of Smith, Peate & Co. Sydney.

== Politics ==
William Perry was appointed as a life member of the Queensland Legislative Council on 22 September 1890. He served until his death on 11 June 1891.

== Personal life ==
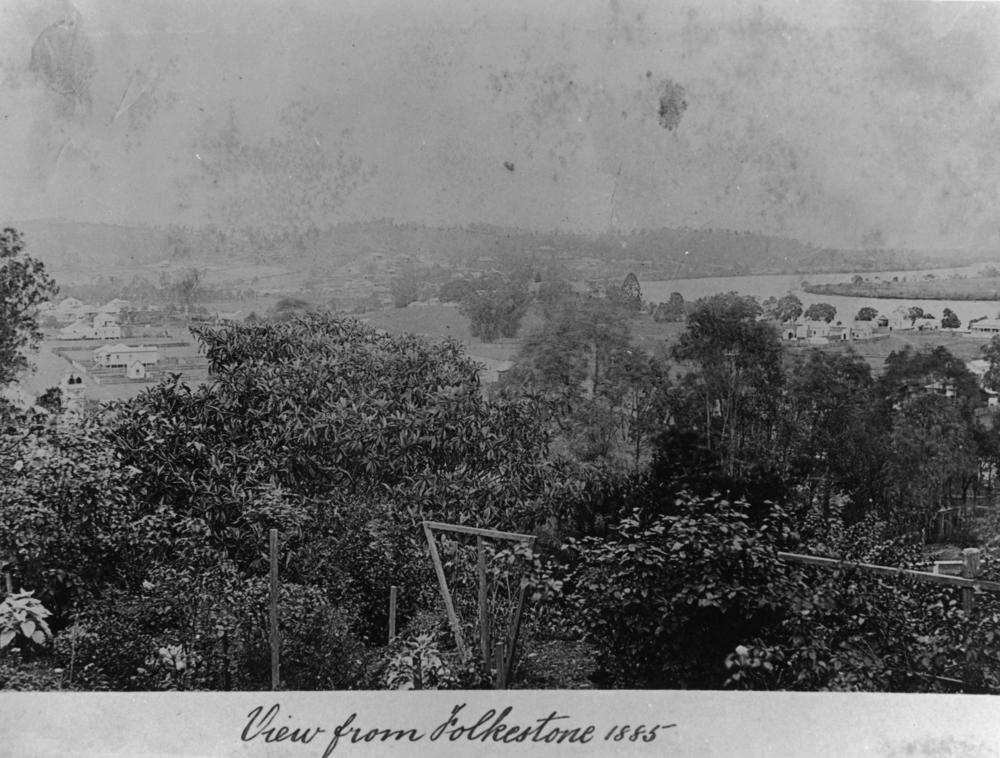
View across to the Brisbane River from Folkestone, 1885

William married Ann/Anne/Annie (1834–1917), the daughter of Birmingham Brass founder, William Harcourt, at St Phillip's Church, in Sydney on 22 February 1862. William Perry built the house Miegunyah at Bowen Hills (also then known as Newstead) as a house for his sons; Miegunyah was lower on the hill from his own home Folkestone.

In April 1891, William Perry purchased Harlaxton House in Toowoomba as a summer residence after the death of its previous owner Francis Thomas Gregory.

== Later life ==
On 11 June 1891, Perry died suddenly at his home Folkestone at Bowen Hills aged 55 years. He was buried in Toowong Cemetery the following day (12 June 1891).

== Legacy ==
Perry Park is named after William Perry. Perry had used the land as his family cattle and horse paddock.

The house Miegunyah that Perry built was added to the Queensland Heritage Register in 1992.

Harlaxton House which Perry owned was added to the Queensland Heritage Register in 1992.
