= Bowen Hills =

- Suburb
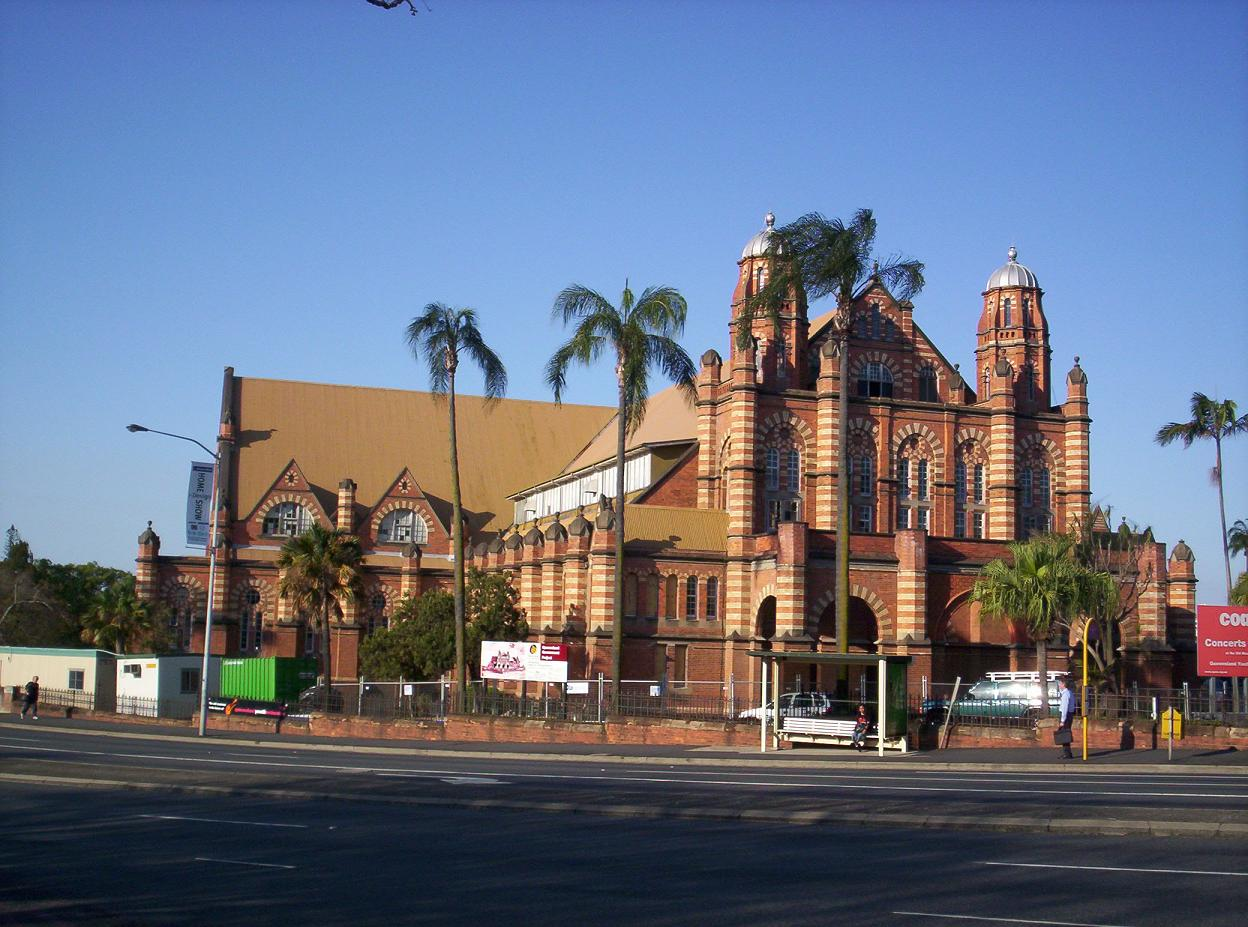
- The Old Museum

- Interactive map of Bowen Hills
- Coordinates: 27.4433°S 153.0361°E
- Country: Australia
- State: Queensland
- City: Brisbane
- LGA: City of Brisbane (Central Ward)
- Location: 3.2 km (2.0 mi) NNE of Brisbane CBD

Government
  - State electorate: McConnel
  - Federal division: Brisbane

Area
  - Total: 1.7 km^{2} (0.66 sq mi)
- Elevation: 22 m (72 ft)

Population
  - Total: 4,898 (2021 census)
  - Density: 2,880/km^{2} (7,460/sq mi)
- Time zone: UTC+10:00 (AEST)
- Postcode: 4006
Suburbs around Bowen Hills
Windsor	Albion	Albion
Herston	Bowen Hills	Newstead
Spring Hill	Fortitude Valley	New Farm

Bowen Hills is an inner north-eastern suburb in the City of Brisbane, Queensland, Australia. In the 2021 census, Bowen Hills had a population of 4,898 people.

== Geography ==
Bowen Hills is 3.2 kilometres (2.0 mi) by road from the Brisbane CBD.

Mayne is a neighbourhood within the north of the suburb (27.45°S 153.0333°E).

Montpelier is a hill (27.4474°S 153.0405°E) rising to 49 metres (161 ft) above sea level.

There are a number of railway lines passing through the suburb, including the long-distance North Coast railway line, a number of Brisbane suburban lines, and the Exhibition Loop railway line. Railway stations within the suburb are:

- Bowen Hills railway station, serving passengers on the suburban lines (27.4451°S 153.0376°E)
- Exhibition railway station in the centre of the Brisbane Exhibition Grounds, serving staff and patrons (27.4496°S 153.0318°E).
- Mayne Depot railway station, serving the Mayne railway yard (27.4411°S 153.0367°E)
- Mayne Junction railway station, now closed (27.4426°S 153.0377°E)

== History ==
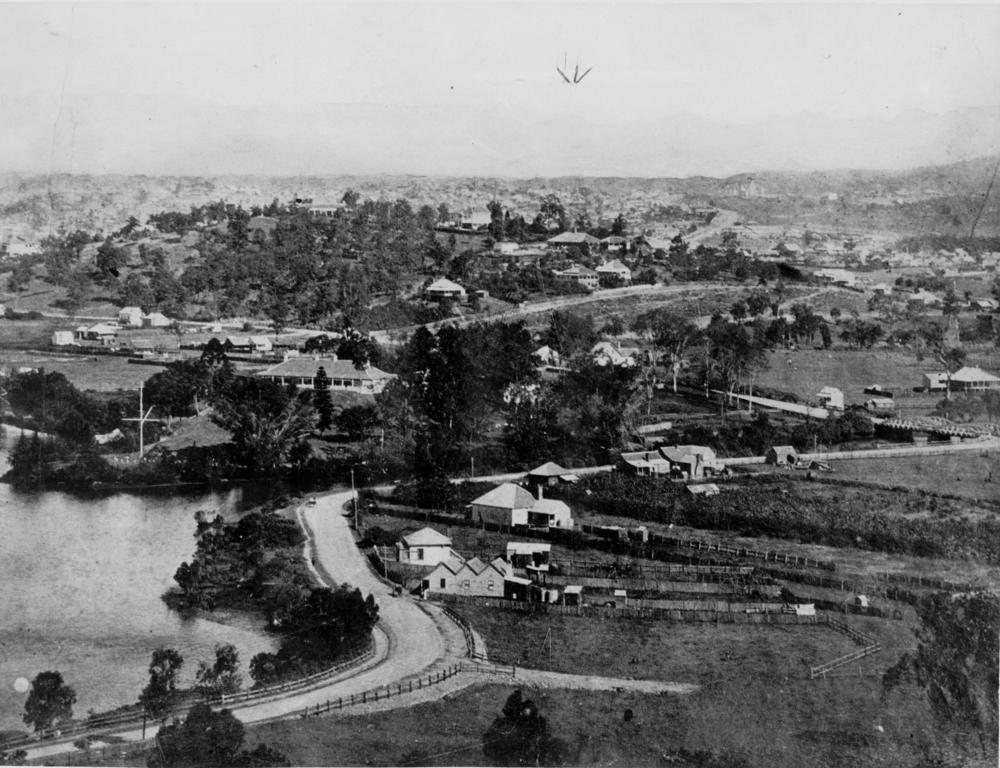
View of Bowen Hills c. 1883

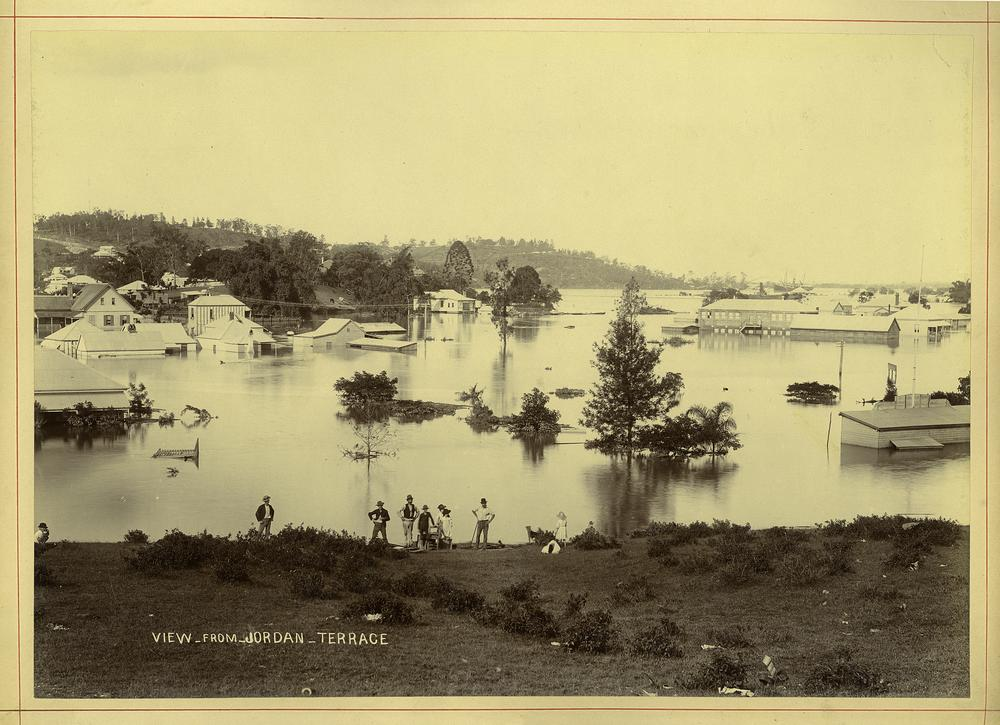
Suburb in flood, 1893

Before white settlement Bowen Hills was occupied by the indigenous Chepara people including the Brisbane, Ipswich and southern Jagera people. The higher parts were named Barrambin meaning windy place because they caught the breezes. It was one of the main campsites for the region, part of the Spring Hill, City area, where on occasions 700 to 1000 people were camped, including Brisbane locals, groups from Ipswich, the Tweed Valley, Wivenhoe, Rosewood, Logan, Stradbroke, North Pine and beyond.

The area now occupied by the grounds of the Brisbane Exhibition Ground and Royal Brisbane and Women's Hospital was named Walan (Woolan), meaning Bream (fish). The area of the present main Ekka oval was a "great fighting ground for the blacks". Barrambin was an important location for "kippa-ring" or initiation ceremony. Tribes from the coast would travel here to have their "kippa's" (young men) initiated. Early European settlement named the area beside Gilchrist Avenue York's Hollow.

The suburb was named after Queensland Governor Sir George Ferguson Bowen.

The locality of Mayne is named after alderman Patrick Mayne.

The Queensland Acclimatisation Society occupied Bowen Park in 1862, the area later known as the RNA Exhibition Grounds and home to the Brisbane Ekka, although part of it still remains as parkland.

In 1866 Bowen Hills was defined as a postal district. Settlement increased in the 1870s. A post office was opened in 1878. The train station was opened in 1882.

In 1886, William Perry, a local businessman, built Miegunyah House. The gracious Victorian era home remains intact today as a museum hosting historical talks and themed exhibitions.

Our Lady of Victories' Primary School opened on 13 November 1921 and closed in 1966.

From 1924 until the 1970s, the Queensland Branch of the Australasian Trained Nurses Association (ATNA) operated a home for retired invalid members at 'Pymore', Mallon Street.

In the mid-twentieth century Bowen Hills was well known as the location of the Cloudland dance hall. Cloudland's domed structure on top of a hill was a prominent landmark on Brisbane's northside. Cloudland was controversially demolished in 1982 to make way for an apartment development.

From 1950 until 1972, owners Brian and Marjorie Johnstone operated the Johnstone Gallery in Cintra Road, Bowen Hills. The gallery was the driving force behind building an appreciation of contemporary Australian art in Brisbane and beyond, arguably Australia's most famous commercial gallery of the time. Owners Brian and Marjorie Johnstone created a focal point of Brisbane's cultural and social life, with their Sunday exhibition openings featuring leading Australian artists such as Sir Sidney Nolan, Robert Dickerson, Lawrence Daws, Margaret Olley, Charles Blackman, Ray Crooke, Arthur Boyd, Donald Friend, Laurence Hope. Their collection documenting the success of their gallery is now held by the State Library of Queensland and in 2021 it was added to UNESCO's Australian Memory of the World Register.

In the 1960s, Queensland Newspapers built its headquarters at Campbell Street Bowen Hills having previously operated out of Adelaide Street.

Bowen Hills Special School opened in January 1986 and closed on 11 December 1987.

In the 2010s, a number of new residential apartment complexes were constructed in the area, with a range of retail outlets built to cater to Brisbane's growing population.

== Demographics ==
In the 2016 census, Bowen Hills recorded a population of 3,226 people, 45.6% women and 54.4% men. The median age of the Bowen Hills population was 30 years of age, 8 years below the Australian median. 49.0% of people were born in Australia. The next most common country of birth was New Zealand at 3.9%. 59.5% of people spoke only English at home. Other languages spoken at home included Mandarin 4.8% and Spanish 3.2%. The most common response for religion was No Religion at 38.3%.

In the 2021 census, Bowen Hills had a population of 4,898 people.

== Heritage listings ==
Bowen Hills has a number of heritage-listed sites, including:

- O'Connell Terrace: Bowen Park
- 23 Boyd Street: Cintra House
- 29 Cintra Road: Our Lady of Victories Catholic Church
- 35 Jordan Terrace: Miegunyah
- 480 Gregory Terrace: Old Museum Building
- 574 Gregory Terrace: Brisbane Exhibition Ground

== Education ==
There are no schools in Bowen Hills. The nearest government primary schools are Brisbane Central State School in neighbouring Spring Hill to the south-west, Ascot State School in Ascot to the north-east, and New Farm State School in New Farm to the south-east. The nearest government secondary schools are Kelvin Grove State College in Kelvin Grove to the west and Kedron State High School in Kedron to the north.

== Amenitites ==
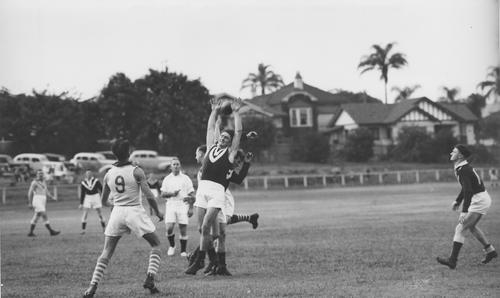
Taringa vs Wests Australian rules football match at Perry Park, Bowen Hills in the 1930s

The Twelfth Night Theatre, with live theatre, is in Bowen Hills. Many well-known actors have appeared in plays at the Twelfth Night Theatre, including Derek Fowlds, John Inman, Jon English and Drew Forsythe.

The Old Museum, in Gregory Terrace, Bowen Hills, was the former location of the Queensland Museum until the museum's move to the Queensland Cultural Centre during the 1980s. The building is now home to the Queensland Youth Orchestras and provides rehearsal and performance space for many other community music and arts groups.

A major feature on the Brisbane calendar of events, the Royal Queensland Show (the Ekka), is held each year at the Brisbane Exhibition Grounds at Bowen Hills.

Bowen Park is a small public pleasure garden with a long history dating back to 1863.

Perry Park Stadium is a sports ground, mostly used for soccer.

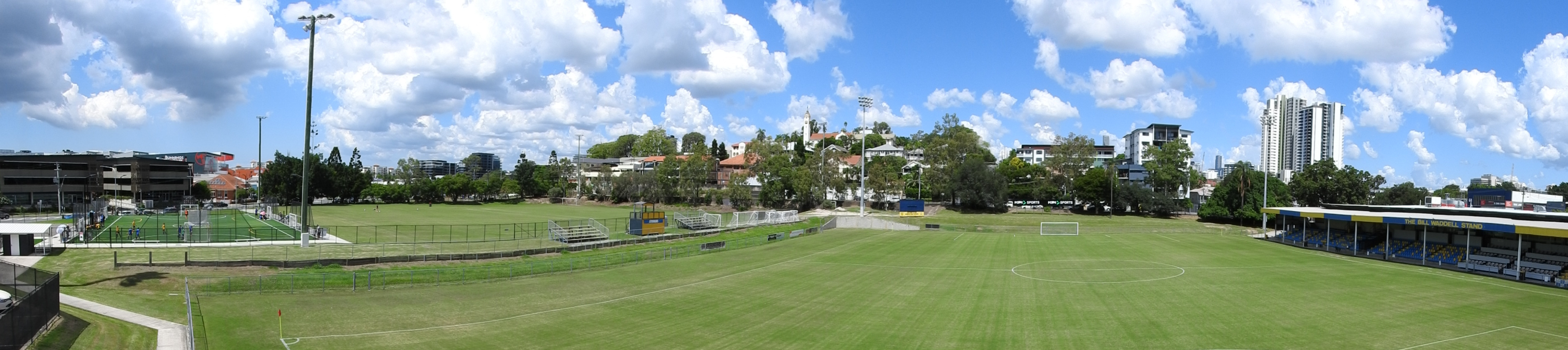
Panorama view of Bowen Hills from east to south from Perry Park, Bowen Hills (2021)

There are a number of parks in the area:

- Booroodabin Recreation Reserve (27.4447°S 153.0427°E)
- Bowen Bridge Rd Park East (27.4445°S 153.0298°E)
- Bowen Park (27.4488°S 153.0298°E)
- Cowlishaw Street Park (27.4481°S 153.0419°E)
- Jeays Street Park (27.4487°S 153.0365°E)
- Perry Park (27.4435°S 153.0400°E)

== Transport ==
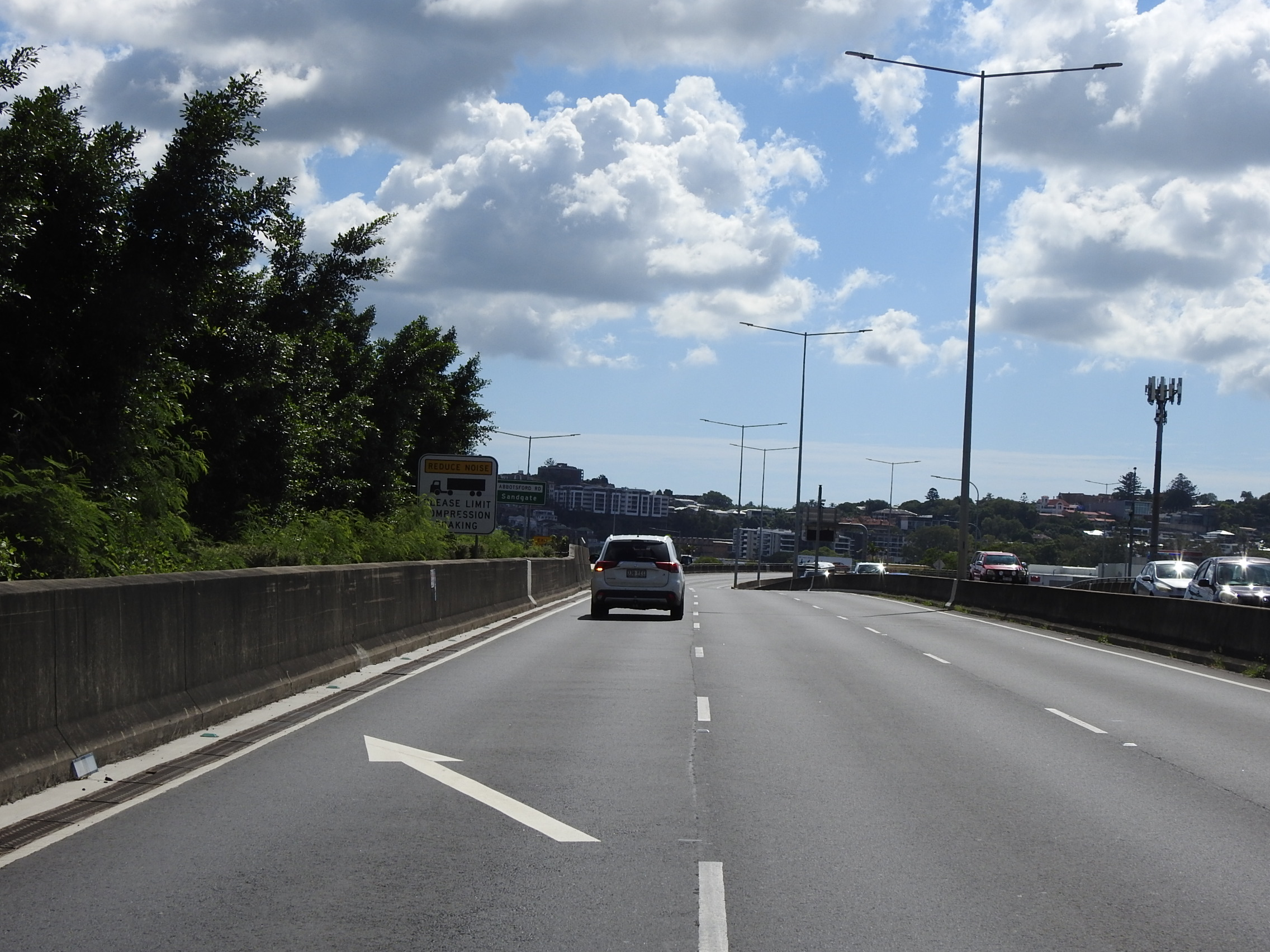
Inner City Bypass (2021)

By train, Bowen Hills station is also one of Queensland's busiest railway stations with all Queensland Rail City network services on all lines, including express trains, stopping there; many services in peak periods terminate at Bowen Hills. Bowen Hills is home to a large Queensland Rail maintenance and stabling depot.

By road, The TransApex infrastructure plans for Brisbane has several interconnections in Bowen Hills. The Clem Jones Tunnel, Airport Link Tunnel and Inner City Bypass all have an entry/exit point in Bowen Hills and connect with each other at a spaghetti intersection.

== Economy ==
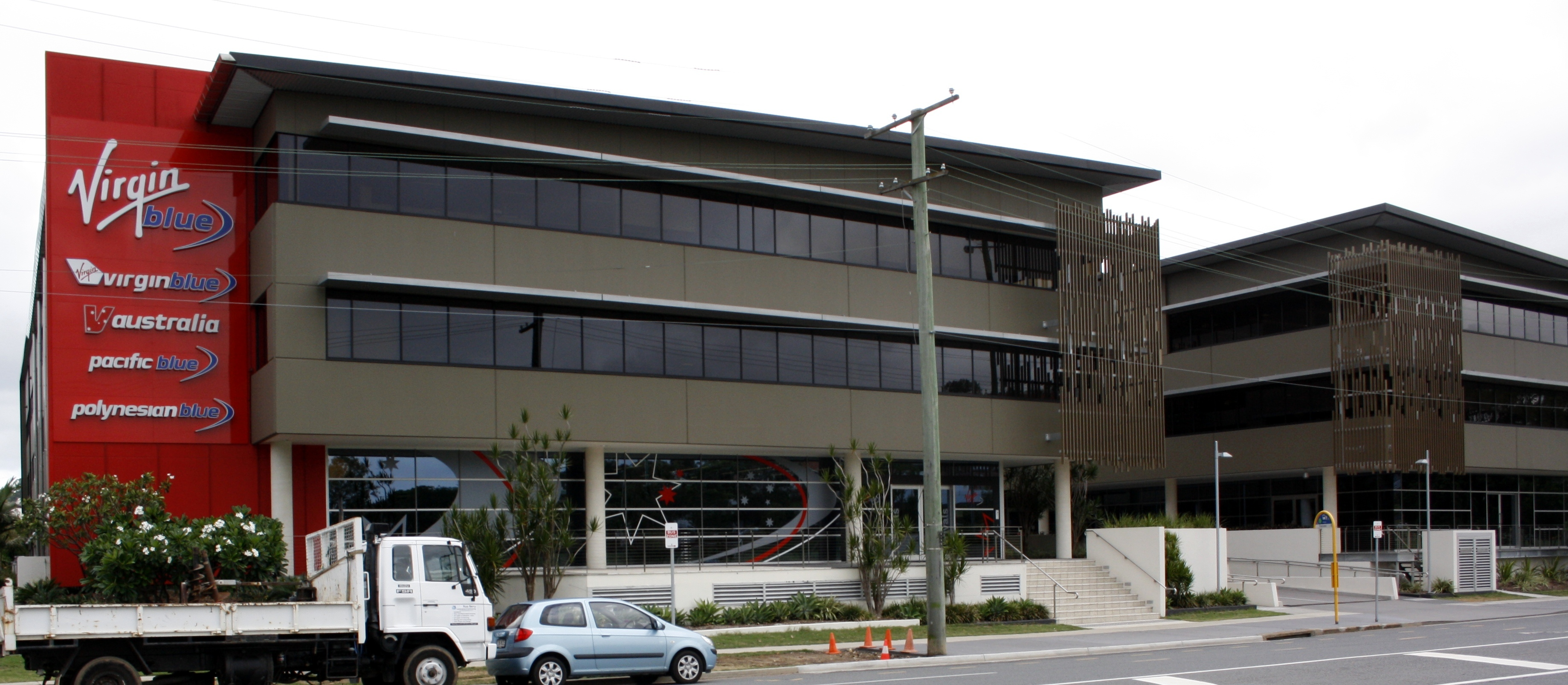
Virgin Village, the past Virgin Australia Holdings head office in Bowen Hills

Virgin Australia Holdings, including Virgin Australia; and associated airlines Virgin Australia International Airlines (formerly V Australia) and Virgin Samoa (formerly Polynesian Blue); had their head office in Virgin Village in Bowen Hills until September 2020, when it was moved to South Brisbane. In 2008 1,000 employees had worked at Virgin Village, which opened on 17 October 2008. In addition Sunstate Airlines, which operates under the QantasLink banner, has its head office in Bowen Hills.

The headquarters of Brisbane's two newspapers, The Courier-Mail and The Sunday Mail, are located on Campbell Street, Bowen Hills.

There are a growing number of retail outlets trading from and primarily catering to residents in the developing urban renewal area.
