= James Crawford (footballer, born 1877) =

Scottish footballer

Personal information
- Date of birth: 1874
- Place of birth: Leith, Scotland
- Height: 5 ft 6 in (1.68 m)
- Position: Winger

Senior career*
| Years | Team | Apps | (Gls) |
| 1895–1896 | Rangers | | |
| 1896–1897 | Abercorn | | |
| 1897–1898 | Reading | | |
| 1898–1900 | Sunderland | 55 | (4) |
| 1900–1901 | Derby County | 42 | (1) |
| 1901–1903 | Middlesbrough | 24 | (1) |
- * Club domestic league appearances and goals

James Crawford (1874 – 1949) was a Scottish professional footballer who played as a winger for Sunderland.
