= Jim Crawford (playwright) =

Australian playwright (1908–1973)

James Crawford (6 February 1908 – 11 November 1973) was an Australian playwright and commentator who wrote political plays, feature articles for newspapers and was very involved in many social and political groups. He was best known for his plays Rocket Range and Billets and Badges. Crawford wrote twenty-four plays and twenty-one skits which are known about. Some of the plays were turned into radio dramas. Crawford also wrote numerous newspaper articles in relation to political and social problems at the time which led him to be well respected in the community.

Possible photo of James Crawford. Found in Fryer Library Collection UQFL301. Box 9, Folder 4

Crawford was born in Manchester, England, in 1908 and arrived in Australia in 1924. As a playwright, Crawford was influenced by William Shakespeare and Christopher Marlowe. He was also greatly influenced by the Communist Party of Australia and the ideals it stood for. In an article written by Crawford about Elizabethan Theatre he wrote that "In the Elizabethan Theatre, Marlowe spoke with the voice of the radical intellectual. Shakespeare spoke with the voice of the people." From the themes of the plays written by Crawford it is clear he has tried to emulate both Marlowe and Shakespeare.

Crawford was an important member of the Roving Reds Revue Company, New Theatre Club and Realist Writers Group. He also made contributions to several other groups. Crawford also spent time in the Army Services after marrying Ursula Hills in 1938. After his divorce from Ursula, Crawford married Pamela Crawford (née Seeman) in 1949. Crawford continued writing right up until his death at Greenslopes Hospital on 11 November 1973.

== History ==
=== Early years ===
James Crawford was the son of John 'Oakden' Potter, a civil engineer, and Janet Keer, who was originally from the island of Arran. He was born in Manchester, England on 6 December 1908 as John Oakden. Crawford was the youngest of the family with four other brothers and sisters. Crawford's mother died when he was eleven years old, leaving his eldest sister to run the household, as Crawford's father travelled for work. Whilst attending a school in Manchester, Crawford began to develop an interest in Shakespeare which he was taught to perform instead of reading it out aloud.

In 1924 Crawford finished up at his grammar school with the intention of traveling. At the young age of 16 he found himself on a ship destined for Australia, and arrived on its shores in 1924. Crawford had originally intended to travel to Canada, however, his father suggested Australia because of the warmer climate. Crawford described his younger self as a "starry eyed idealist". Once in Australia, Crawford worked as a stockman on a cattle station known as 'Kamileroi'. For the next five years, he worked as a station hand in the Gulf Country. Working in the Gulf Country alongside the Indigenous Australian people and seeing the brutal way in which they were treated spurred Crawford's passion for equal rights. His empathy for the Indigenous Australians can be seen in this quote taken from an interview, "the Aborigine has always been a very good, humane person". Crawford's first brush with the law was because he gave meat (intended for white people) to Aboriginal stockmen while he worked as a butcher. He considered himself lucky as he was not thrown in gaol but given a warning by the police. He used this personal experience as inspiration for his plays. With the intention of travelling around Australia, Crawford undertook menial work to make the necessary money. Although his time working and travelling around Australia was an experience, Crawford stated "you wouldn't get me back there".

Crawford left for New Zealand in 1929 and stayed there until 1932. His intention was to travel to South America and then head back to England, but when boarding a ship that was supposedly going to Valparaíso, it landed in Australia. Australia was going through the depression which forced Crawford to join the unemployed bagman.

=== Career, writing, associations ===
During 1932, Crawford joined the Unemployed Workers Movement, which was active in protests in Cairns and participated in riots in Mackay. While unemployed and living at the 'Bagman's Camp' in Victoria Park, Brisbane, he gave lectures on William Shakespeare to his unemployed acquaintances. Whilst based at the camp Crawford was introduced to The Communist Manifesto and after reading and agreeing with its political standpoint joined the Communist Party of Australia in 1934. Jim regarded himself as a socialist and was very impressed by Engels' work which was the Origin of the Family and Private Property and the State (1984). These inspirations gave Jim knowledge about Aboriginal law and society. Crawford also studied the science of Marxism and Leninism.

Jim Crawford helped found the Roving Reds Revue Company with fellow bagmen. The group was also known as The Proletarian Players. The Roving Reds Revue Company was described as the most sectarian group that had ever existed in Australia. This group was created for two purposes; to raise money for the Unemployed Workers' Movement and also to criticise the Australian establishment in every possible way. However, this theatrical group only lasted for a short while due to the competition with the Student Theatre. Crawford originally wanted to become an actor, however, being told he was superior in playwriting he began writing for the company. Yet, Crawford stated that he was chosen to become the playwright for the Roving Reds as he was known to "quote the second soliloquy of Hamlet" while drunk. Crawford travelled on his bike around Australia to explain the reason for the Proletarian Revolution. His travels gained him the nickname the 'Anarchy Bull-Bearing Bum' . While travelling, he had various jobs such as working on cotton farms in Callide Valley (Queensland), cutting wood for bakers' ovens in New South Wales, milking cows and packing tomatoes.

In 1935, Crawford went to Melbourne where he stayed for eleven years, excluding the five years he spent in war service. He was involved in groups during his time in Melbourne such as the Left Book Club, the Victorian Communist Party, The Unity Theatre and the Worker's Voice, which was the forerunner of the Victorian Guardian. During pre-war period, the Worker's Voice had the largest circulation of any Communist Party paper in the Southern Hemisphere. During the years he worked as a journalist, Crawford passionately helped to expose the struggles of the times. For example, he helped to expose the spy mission of the German naval submarine commander, Count von Luckner also known as the 'Yachtsman adventurer'. Luckner was a Nazi who travelled around the world spying for Adolf Hitler. Due to his participation in the 'No Scrap Iron for Imperialist Japan' demonstrations in Melbourne, Crawford spent two days in the jail cell that Ned Kelly was incarcerated in just before he was hung. Alan Marshall and Crawford interviewed Hewlett Johnson, The Red Dean of Canterbury, together for the Worker's Voice. The Red Dean, also known as Dr Hewlett Johnson, was the dean of Canterbury in 1931 and has been described as "one of the most famous men in the world". Marshall noted Crawford as being an outstanding journalist and one of the best at the Worker's Voice.

On 8 August 1939, Crawford married Ursula Mary Hill using his birth name John Oakden-Potter.

While working at the Victorian Guardian newspaper, he wrote a weekly column under the name Jim Crawford. In 1940, he adopted the name 'Jim Crawford' by deed poll as he became well known through his weekly column. In the same year, Crawford had to go underground when the Australian Government outlawed the Communist Party. Because the Victorian Guardian Newspaper wrote about Communist issues, it was also prohibited. Crawford wrote illegal newspapers in Communist follower's basements. His friend Cecil Sharpley used to deliver the supplies. As Crawford was still involved with the illegal newspaper he was continuously on the run from the police. Towards the end of the war he discovered that Sharpley was the one who exposed his involvement with the newspaper. It was only when the Soviet Union entered the war that the ban on the Communist Party was lifted and the paper became legalised. However, due to the censorship of the war period, the paper had reduced in size.

On 21 January 1942, Jim Crawford enlisted in the Australian Army Medical Corps. Crawford wanted to enlist earlier but he had not been medically fit. When Crawford grew tired of peeling spuds he was discharged in September and worked as a stoker in the Royal Australian Naval Reserve, serving aboard mine-sweepers guarding the B.H.P steel works at Whyalla. While working as a stoker, Crawford founded a Worker's study group. Crawford also spoke at War Loan Rallies. At one rally he spoke on a platform with future Australian Prime Minister, Harold Holt, who shouted Crawford to a double whisky after his speech. Jim was charged with mutiny for organising to stop work of naval stokers until they were paid trade union rates. They stood firm and gained the Union rates they were after, however, Crawford was transferred to New Guinea to the Naval Depot HMS Ladava. In 1944, he experienced the bombing by the Japanese in New Guinea. He also served aboard an Icelandic fishing trawler converted to minesweeper HMS Beryl. While working on the minesweeper Crawford had to shovel coal into the furnace. This coal shovelling had caused permanent damage to Crawford's lungs and he developed emphysema. In January 1945, he was discharged from the navy with a pension as he was suffering from a duodenal ulcer. Once discharged from the navy, he arrived back in Melbourne and wrote for large newspapers, such as the Sporting Globe and the Melbourne Guardian. He worked for the Melbourne Guardian for ten years, writing mostly about political issues.

The separation of the war had caused damage to his relationship with his wife and he divorced Ursula, in 1946. During the latter part of 1948, Jim worked with the Queensland Guardian in Brisbane on a temporary basis. He lived in Brisbane for the rest of his life. In 1948, Crawford got a serious case of pneumonia and was given up for dead. However, he managed to pull through and got married six months later to Pamela Mary Seeman on 22 December 1949. Pamela was an artist, and once married they bought several acres of rainforest on Tamborine Mountain and settled on the mountain.

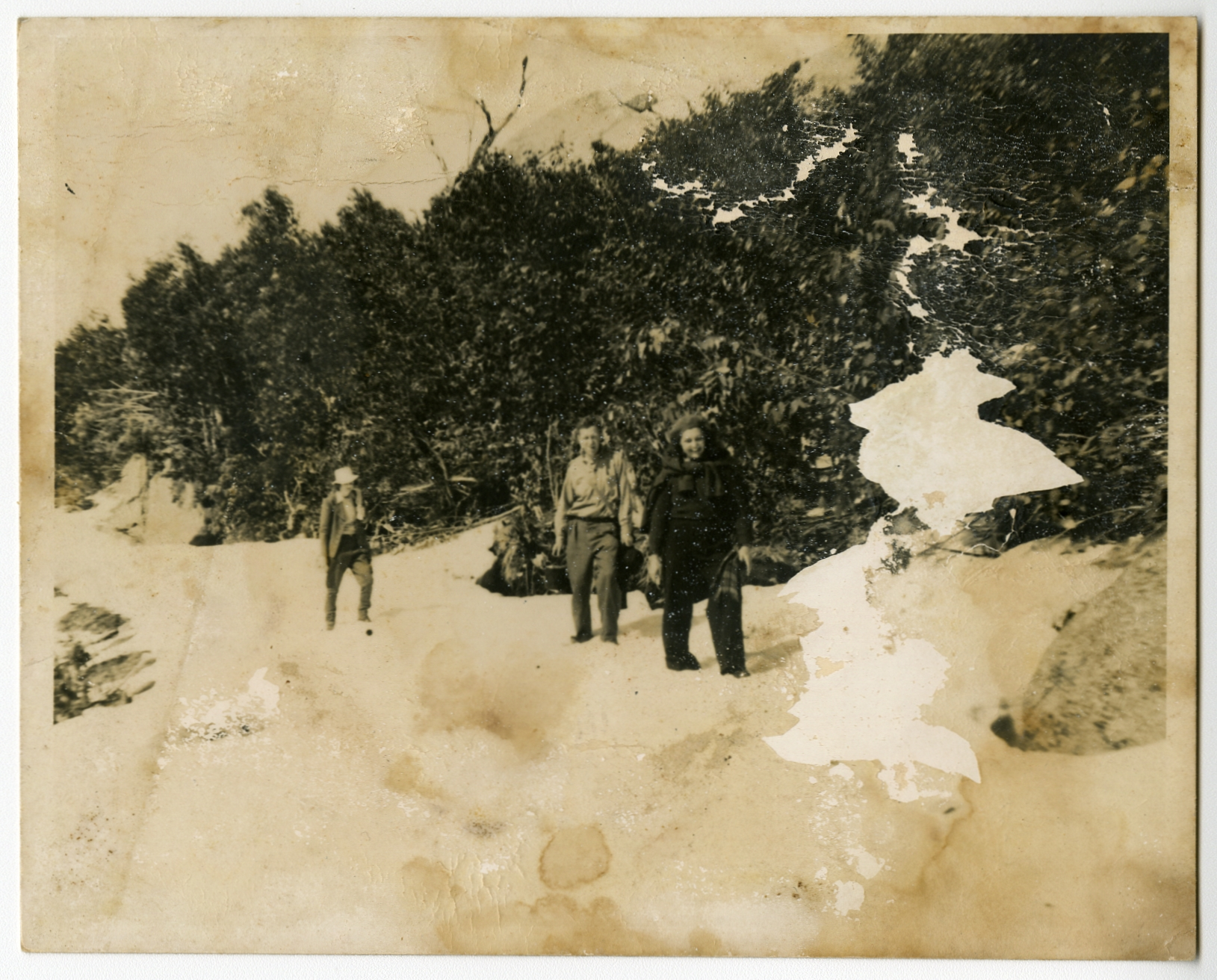
Possible photo of James and Pamela Crawford. Found in Fryer Library Collection UQFL301. Box 9, Folder 4.

It was during this time that Crawford began writing for the theatre. Throughout his lifetime, Crawford wrote around seventeen plays. In addition to his plays, he wrote several short stories, such as, Pipers All and The Bottle. He was described as a controversial left-wing journalist with his plays being described as propagandist. His first play was a one-act called Welcome Home.

His second play was Rocket Range which explored the unfair treatment of Aboriginals in Central Australia. Rocket Range was first produced in Melbourne in 1947 and afterwards the Sydney New Theatre. This play received awards and entered the British Drama League Festival in 1947. Crawford wrote several plays in support for Aboriginal Rights but Rocket Range would become the most well known and the most controversial. The play was entered into the British Drama League Festival in 1947 and although the play received a score of 75 out of a possible 100 it was thrown out for being 'ideological propaganda'. The play received 10/10 for Stage Presentation, 40/40 for Acting and 25/30 for Overall Production. However, the play received no marks under the section 'Choice of Play' and festival adjudicator Mr Harvey Adams had the following comments to make about the reasons behind the plays zero score:

'From the point of view of 'theatre' there was no reason either to write or produce this play. As Adjudicator I am not concerned with either the authors or the society's object in presenting it. It was obviously designed to 'tilt at the windmill' and it falls very short of its mark. The authors intentions appear to advocate that Australian civilisation is not only wrong but in extremely bad taste.'

The Adjudicator then goes on to compare the intentions of the play to that of 'the spirit of the Chartist Riots Chartism and continued,

'Just as looms came to take their rightful place in modern advancement, so will all future inventions and developments in science, and no puny, pinchbeck efforts, having their roots bugged in the swamps of sentimental ignorance will be able to item their advance toward the betterment of mankind. I cannot but feel that this play has been chosen for presentation for not other reason than ideological propaganda and as such, I have no opinion but to throw it out of what is designed as a 'Theatrical' Festival.'

Despite this, the play was well received later in 1953 in the Ipswich Play Festival. In 1957, the Rocket Range was banned at a play reading held at the Municipal Library Hall (Brisbane) for being too 'political'.

In 1947, Jim Crawford also wrote a play Refugee which addressed the issues around antisemitism. During the late 1940s Crawford wrote Uneasy Stages, Miner's Right, and Frame-Up. Crawford wrote another three-act play called Governor's Stables which was entered into the Theatre Council of West Australia's playwriting competition in 1951. It won the first prize which was one hundred and fifty pounds. Of all the Australian male playwrights produced at the New Theatre only Jim Crawford and another playwright, Dick Diamond, author of Reedy River had their plays performed in Sydney and more than one production.

Jim Crawford wrote for the Junior Youth League of Queensland to perform at a Youth Carnival in Sydney. He wrote a one-act play called Bushland Picnic, in 1952, and afterwards, he wrote another one-act children's play called The Man-eating Clock. In March 1953, Crawford wrote a one-act play the People's Paper for the Land Guardian Festival. This play contrasted the reporting of events in Progressive newspapers and the capitalist press.

At the end of 1953, Crawford went to Townsville for several months to assist in reporting for the Guardian newspaper on the very successful North QLD Rank and File Worker's convention. The Playwrights Advisory Board sponsored a playwriting competition in 1955 and Crawford entered a three-act play. This play was titled The Wit to Woo and was about a hospitalised patient who had a dream of finding a hard working life. Crawford wrote another play for the Ipswich Drama Festival of 1956 called They Passed this Way. It was about the old Windmill cum Observatory on Wickham Terrace, Brisbane and was performed in Brisbane by New Theatre. Jim wrote several radio features about this time, The Avenging Ghost of Campbell Town and The Celebrated Mr Barrington with various successes.

=== Later years and death ===
In Crawford's later years he continued to write plays. For the Queensland Peace Committee, Crawford wrote A Most Important Letter!, in 1962. In the same year, he wrote a three-act play called The Colour of His Money. In 1963, he wrote three plays, Shakespeare at Cedar Creek and A Little Bird Told Me for the Junior Youth League and Under the Bunya for the Wattle Dance Group. In 1969, Crawford created a play titled the Billets or Badges for the Queensland Centenary celebrations. This play was about the famous Tramways Strike in Brisbane during 1912 and made quite an impact among the audience. The last full-length play that Jim Crawford wrote was The Cavern and the Tavern. Jim Crawford died on 11 November 1973 of myocardial infarction in the Greenslopes Respiration Hospital. He had no children but was survived by his wife, Pamela. Crawford was known for his good humour which was aimed at the enemies of the workers.

== Style and influence ==
Jim Crawford was a Realist writer and a part of the National Council of Groups. He was associated with many other playwrights in Australia at the time, who were both Communists and playwrights. Crawford's political interests were his biggest influences and his career as a journalist gave him access to the latest political news stories and contemporary feelings on issues such as Aboriginal rights, women's rights and the rethinking of Capitalist ideas.

Crawford's life on a cattle station was the inspiration for his short sketch/play 'The Cattle King' as well as other pieces that explored the treatment of Aboriginals. He also drew inspiration from contemporary socio-political issues such as nuclear testing at Woomera ('Rocket Range') and the 1912 Tramway Strike in Brisbane (Billets and Badges). He also took an interest in the Beatnik culture which arose in the US and which spread to Australia in the sixties as their values reflected some of the socialist values and goals of the local Communist Party. This became the inspiration for 'The Ice Age Delinquents'.

Crawford was deeply influenced by the work of William Shakespeare and Christopher Marlowe. His articles which appeared in Queensland Guardian and The Tribune shows Crawford to have had historical and textual knowledge of the work of these two artists. Crawford endeavoured to write work that was politically and socially engaging and to write work that had a positive influence on the audience.

== Plays ==
Title	Production Detail	Notes/Synopsis
Welcome Home	One Act, Three Scenes	The themes of this play centred on ex-service men returning home from the war and the post war housing shortage. First produced by Melbourne New Theatre Group on Flinders Street and was a curtain raiser for Fountains Beyond by George Landen Dann. (1946)
Rocket Range	One Act, Three Scenes	Explored the impact of Capitalism on Aboriginal society. The play discovers the problems that a rocket range at Woomera, Australia had on the Aboriginal population. It was first produced by the Sydney New Theatre from 14 March to 6 April 1947. Originally entered into British Drama League's Festival of that year and the adjudicator gave the production full marks for stage presentation and acting. (1947)
Refugee	Three Acts	Themes explored in Refugee include background of big business, national chauvinism and anti-Semitism. Written in Melbourne in 1947 and first produced by the Eureka Youth League 13 November 1949. (1947)
Miner's Right	Three Acts	Humanitarian and Industrial problems on the coal fields are the underlying themes of this play believed to have been drafted in Melbourne and finished in Brisbane. First produced by Brisbane Unity Theatre and staged at the Princess Theatre on 11 November 1948. (1948)
Uneasy Stages	Three Acts	First titled: All The World's a Stage. A satire of Bourgeois control of the theatre, Uneasy Stages was written whilst Crawford was in Melbourne some time in 1948. The play's first public reading was by the New Theatre Group in Brisbane on 31 October 1949. (1948)
Frame up	Three Acts	Themes included pimps and the Labour movement. Written in Brisbane in 1949 with no production. (1949)
The Governor's Stables	Three Acts	The writing of this play was inspired by the Commonwealth Jubilee Celebrations of 1951 and was entered in the West Australian Theatre Councils play writing competition receiving first prize. It later went on to be produced at several theatres. (1951)
Bushland Picnic	One Act	Written as part of Queensland's contribution to the Youth Carnival for Peace and Friendship held in Sydney from 15 to 23 March 1952. Essentially the play is a children's play with a peace theme. (1952)
The Man Eating Clock	One Act	'Man should be the master of the machine, not the machine mastering man' was the message of Crawford's The Man Eating Clock. It was written not long after Bushland Picnic. (1952)
Worker's Paper	One Act	The play was a sidelight on the different methods and conclusions of the workers press as well as the bosses press. It was commissioned by Queensland Guardian Newspaperfor the Guardian Festival held on 20–22 March 1953. (1953)
The Wit to Woo	Three Acts	A comedy about a character that gets himself admitted to hospital on false pretence; to look for a wife among the hard working nurses. Play was written in the early part of 1955 for entry in the Play Writers Advisory Board 'Sir Edward Hallstrom' Play Competition of 1955. When submitting the play he used the pen name John Wolley which was used on several occasions when submitting manuscripts. Eventually this play was turned into a radio play. (1955)
The Avenging Ghost of Campbell Town		Also written under the pen name John Wolley. Was made as a radio feature and went to air August 1955. (1955)
They Passed This Way	One act	Concerned the early origins of the Brisbane Observatory, originally a windmill for grinding grain mostly worked by treadmill by convicts. Captain Logan used it as a gallows. Originally written for entrance into the Ipswich Drama Festival in 1956 and performed for a couple of weekends in 1957 in Brisbane. (1956)
Billets or Badges	Three Acts	Billets or Badges was written as the Brisbane New Theatre's contribution to Queensland's Centenary in 1959. The story is set against the background of the Tramway Union for the right to wear their union badge, a subplot evolving around women's rights. Theme of the play is the struggle for free trade unionism and women's rights, which culminated in the great Tram Strike of 1912 when forty-three trade unions covering 21,000 unionists joined in a general strike in defence of unionism. This play was staged at the Enoggera Memorial Hall on Monday, 23 November at 8pm.
List of songs from the musical		• 'The Wearing of the Badge' – Reprinted from the 'Worker' of March 1912. Sung to the tune of "The Wearing of the Greens." • "It's a Union for you and for me" – From "The Workers of the World Are New Awakening" by Richard Brazier. Sung to the tune "In the Shade of the Old Apple Tree" • "The Banks Are Made of Marble" • "The Ballad of the Swagman" – Words by Jim Crawford, Music by John Bellamy (musicals musical director) • "Emma Miller" – From an old poem, music by John Bellamy • "Once A Little Maiden" – Sung to the tune of "After the Ball" • "A Little Bit off The Top" – Sung to a variation on a popular tune. • "Love Duet – Happy When We're Married" – words by Jim Crawford, music by John Bellamy. • "It's Nice To Be A Lady" – words by Jim Crawford sung to the tune of "See Me Dance The Polka"
Party Pageant		Capitalist Narrator and Communist Party Narrator giving opposing views on passages of history. It was written to commemorate the 40th Anniversary of the Australian Communist Party. Commissioned by the Queensland State Committee for the Australian Communist Party and presented at the Brisbane Trades Hall on Saturday, 29 October 1960. (1960)
Greased Lighting		Written under pen name Darby Pike and was entered in the Sir Thomas White memorial short story competition in February 1962. (1962)
The Celebrate Mr Barrington		Written under pen name John Wolley. Mr Barrington was known in his day as the Prince of Pickpockets. Sent away to Australian Broadcasting Commission and British Broadcasting Corporation but were both returned. Mr Wolley retired after this.
A Most Important Letter	One Act	Peace themed play, involving various archetypal characters from the past. They appear to call for the preservation of life and to warn of the total destruction which would result from Thermo Nuclear War. A Most Important Letter was commissioned as part of Disarmament Week – Sunday 5–11 August 1962. The first performance was held on Thursday 2 August at Harriers Hall, Stones Corner, Brisbane (For Stone's Corner Peace Group) with performance following on 4 August played at Kurilpa Hall, West End (for West End Peace Group). It was also staged at Enoggera Memorial Hall on Thursday 18 October 1962 sponsored by the Union of Australian Women Enoggera Branch; For the Queensland Peace Committee. Brisbane New Theatre Club next produced A Most Important Letter ona program with a play by Soviet Playwright Konstantin Simonov titled The Fourth for four performances – 9/10 November, 16/17 November 1962 at the Social Services Hall, Bertwich Street Fortitude Valley. (1962)
Under the Bunya		This play was commissioned in the later part of 1963 by the Wattle Dance Group for their end of year concert. The proceeds from the short play were to defray costs of sending students to the National Summer Dance School of the Association of Australian Dancers to be held in Sydney in January 1964. It was staged at the All Saints Hall on Saturday 2 November 1963. The play is woven around the theme of school children rehearsing songs and dances for the school concert. (1963)
A Little Bird Told Me		A children's play about the importance of protecting wildlife. Written first half of 1964 and sent under the non-de-plume of "Wonga" to the competition for a one-act play sponsored by the New South Wales Gould League of Bird Lovers. The theme of the play, which had to be suitable for school children, was to emphasise the necessity of protecting Australian birds and their natural habitat. The original idea for 'A Little Bird Told Me' was first prompted in mid-1963 when a request came from the organisers of the International Children's Day for a pageant type play for children of varying age; a different form of celebration that for that years International Children's Day was adopted. Play was sent away by the playwright but nothing more was heard from them. (1964)
Shakespeare at Cedar Creek	One Act	Commissioned in April 1964 by the Junior Eureka League for a performance to celebrate International Children's Day. This coincided with Crawford's articles which were written to commemorate the 400th birthday of William Shakespeare.
The Cavern and the Tavern/The Ice Age Delinquents		Crawford writes in an introduction for the play that it was started in April 1964 with the intent of entering it into the Mary Gilmour May Day Play Competition of that year. However, he was unhappy with idea and the format as it would not be standard time for a three-act play. It was abandoned then for the time being and when the closing date of the competition was extended to the end of May, Crawford wrote The Colour of His Money and entered it instead. The Cavern and The Tavern was rewritten in 1968 and was close to being finalised although Crawford was still unhappy about the ending of the play. He decided that Act One could in fact be a play in its own right and so took it and titled it 10,000 B.C or The Ice Age Delinquents: A Rumination in One Act. 'It is simply a mild satire on true-blue Conservatives who, throughout all recorded history, at least, have always attacked innovations, but finished up by making use of them after they had previously failed to suppress them.' (Introduction, Box 1 Folder 2) The play takes place between 10,000 BC and 6,000 BC in a cave in France (not unlike Le TroisFreres in France) and explores these themes as two young ice age rebels, Big Ears and Bentneck revolt against the constant, stereotypical dancing of the highly respectable Buffalo Fertility Dance. (1964–1968)
The Cruize of The 'Tryer'		A radio feature comedy written January 1970 and sent to various radio stations – commercial ABC and BBC under the pen name 'Walter Egan' (Egan was the maiden name of the playwrights maternal grandmother, a pen name used previously) and also 'John Wolley' (Wolley was the maiden name of the playwrights paternal grandmother) The Cruize of the Tryer was a nautical send-up of sea-farers on a voyage to the South Seas to observe the transit of Venus, this radio farce was suggested by the more serious celebrations planned for the Bi-Centenary of Captain Cooks voyages. No record of productions.
The Cattle King		An expansion of an earlier sketch (or skit) called 'The Jackeroo' or 'The New Chum'. Two Aboriginal men rescue a rather stupid white man. This sketch – 'The Cattle King or Our Bettahs' was performed by Nindethana Theatre, (Aboriginal Theatre) with other sketches, songs etc., at Melbourne University during March 1972; also performed at Monash and Canberra Universities. Later parts of this Aboriginal Review called 'Jack Charles is up and Fighting' were televised by the ABC in a program titled "Prospect". In the early part of 1973 the ABC made a television version of Basically Black with members of the National Black Theatre (Nindehana Theatre) and used the sketch 'The Cattle King' as part of Basically Black for showing in the later part of 1973.

== Sketches ==
Title	Notes/Synopsis
The Jackasses	A short skit about a bet the station cook wins from two smart shearers.
Droving Sketch	A short sketch about Jackie the Aboriginal, an offsider who took a rise out of his drover boss.
Profit Sharing	A sketch written mid-1946. Was produced as part of a Revue and called "Coming Our Way". It was staged by Melbourne New Theatre. Theme – conversation between a Mr BailyouUpp, his son Master Richard, and his butler Jeeves about his boss's idea of sharing the profits.
The Ambassadress' Dress	Comedy sketch written in Melbourne in 1947. Characters suggested by Eva Perón. Sherlock Holmes and Dr Watson themed. Focused on the search for a lost, stolen or strayed ball gown. In Brisbane 1968 this skit was retitled "The Case of the Film Star's Dress" and the leading character changed to a 'Sex Symbol of Filmdom'. Along with several others, this skit was given, in answer to their request, to the Tribe, the performing troop of Foco Club.
Heil Holloway	1948 for Melbourne New Theatres Mobile Theatre. A recent re-enactment by the Victorian parliament of the Essential Services Act, aiming to outlaw strikes. This sketch was later played in Brisbane under the title 'Heil Hanlon' and the Essential Services Act changed to the Anti-Picketing Act.
Diamond Cut Diamond	An 'in house' skit written for one of the New Melbourne Theatres summer schools. A comedy about locals and guests attending the school. (1948)
Re-Union	A shirt sketch with a background of banning overtime in the railways.
Forty Hour Wait	Sketch about Trammies and impact of working broken shifts. The effects included tramway man and family life. Possibly written from author's experience of working on the Melbourne Tramways around 1950. It could also be based on the Brisbane Tramways of 1951. Was performed by Brisbane New Theatre Contact Group.
What about it, Ned?	(Ned refers to one Edward Hanlon, premier of QLD during the early 1950s.)Better known as "The Box of Matched". Theme – The need to pressure Labour Government to control prices and profits. Was performed by Brisbane Contact Theatre Group in late 1952.
The Recruit	A dramatization of a traditional naval joke about a new recruit from Woolloomooloo, who does NOT mistake a marine 'object' for a Bondi Tram. This skit was produced from a Brisbane social, where Woolloomooloo became the Valley and the Bondi tram ran to Moorooka etc. (1950)
It's Nice To Be A Lady	A sketch written in 1966 to introduce the song from 'Billets or Badges' written for the Queensland Centenary 1959
Bus Stop Sketch	Discussion between three women about the need for equal pay. Written for the Union of Australian Women. (1960)
Seven Ages of Woman	A song to the tune of 'The Jolly Mermaid'. Written for the Union of Australian Women at their request to present at 1961 International Women's Day. (1961)
The Remedy	A short sketch written in October 1961 as part of Communist Party campaign in the Federal election of 1961. To be performed by members of New Theatre at rallies and socials etc. Theme – Get monopoly off our backs.
The Good Oil	Written at request from the QCP. Performed by NT. Theme – American control of Australian Petrol distributing Industry (1962)
No Hope in Dope	First titled The Doctor in The House. A satire about the dangers of taking brand name 'pep pills' and 'rejuvenation tablets' flogged by Pharmaceutical Companies. Requested and performed for International Women's Day Committee. First production staged by New Theatre at IWD Celebrations on Saturday, 9 March 1963. Waterside Workers Hall, Brisbane.
Wharfie Skits	Written in the 1940s, these skits were inspired by the lives of Brisbane 'wharfies' or Wharf workers.
Too Cold To Think	Written for the BBC as a radio skit. No record of what the skit was about.
Party Playlet	Commissioned by the Communist Party. No record of what the skit was about.
Hidden Poverty	Performed on 8 September 1947, this skit was written for a Communist Party social at the request of a Mr J. Penbenthy.

== The Roving Reds Revue Company ==
The Roving Reds was a performing theatre group formed in Brisbane in 1933. Many of the performers, playwrights, musicians and production team were gathered from the unemployment camps set up in several parks around Brisbane. Crawford, otherwise known as 'Anarchy, the Ball-Bearing Bum', was the scriptwriter for the Roving Reds, as well as one of the founding members of the group. Most of the plays' themes centred on the social and political problems associated the depression and war. The topic of Soviet Russia and their workers' state was also popular with the militant unemployed. The play, The Metro Ticket Trial was quite a popular production as the theme of the play was about the 'contemporary press attacks on all aspects of Soviet life'.

The main aim of The Roving Reds was to provide funding to the 'Wobble You Em' or more formally known as the Unemployed Workers' Movement. As time went on the group's name changed to The Proletarian Players and were considered similar to the other worker's drama groups established in other states. Eventually The Proletarian Players disappeared as each member moved onto more pressing things. The Roving Reds also known as The Proletarian Players is seen to be the starting point for a lifelong commitment to working class theatre for Crawford.

== New Theatre Club ==
The New Theatre movement started in America in the late 1920s. It was motivated by the depressed economic climate which resulted in widespread unemployment, more people on welfare and evictions of those who could not pay their rent. Most of the pieces performed where agit prop which attempted to capture social reality. When New Theatre groups were formed in Australia (beginning mainly as Worker's arts groups) they continued using agit prop in their plays. They were also committed to developing the highest possible theatrical standards as well as to introduce it to the Australian people by infusing theatre into cultural groups in all industries, organisations and districts. Active participants in the groups were a mix of communists, members of the Labor Party and political unaligned who wanted to be actively involved in the group.

"Can you imagine living in the thirties, without a job, without a good square meal, without a bed to stretch out on, just drifting without a purpose? And then (imagine this too) somebody shows you that life has a purpose. That's what New Theatre offered in the late thirties." This was a selling point for many who had no job, no food and no roof over their heads. To make a stand and try to reclaim what is theirs through political and socially fuelled theatre presentations. Crawford was a homeless bagman, interested in theatre and experience at writing and producing plays through his work for the Roving Reds (AKA The Proletarian Players). It was only natural that Crawford should find his home with in the New Theatre society.

Crawford's first play to be performed by a New Theatre group was Welcome Home by the Melbourne branch in 1946. The views held on social and political problems by the New Theatre group aligned with Crawford's. Some the topics covered by other New Theatre writers included racial discrimination, war and peace, unemployment and other social problems. Some themes of Crawford's plays include the impact of military armament testing on Aboriginal society (Rocket Range), post war housing shortages (Welcome Home) and political commentary plays (Frame Up) just to name a few. Many plays were written to be entered into competitions on behalf of the New Theatre club. Crawford continued working with the New Theatre group for many years and wrote many plays that were performed by them.

== Involvement in political and social movements ==
As well as being an active playwright, Jim Crawford was very interested in social and political movements that affected the wellbeing and rights of others. Crawford was very active in his quest for equality and fairness, attending many conferences and writing articles for newspapers and magazines. Many of Crawford's stage and radio plays included themes of the battler fighting against the establishment; people trying to gain rights, as well as issues within society which he thought may need attention from a larger audience. Joe Harris, a follow Communist Party member, outlined the aim of a progressive writer in a letter of correspondence between himself and Crawford in regards to the manuscript of Billets or Badges: "It will be agreed that the task of progressive writers is to use art as a weapon in the working class struggle. Helping to defeat employing class ideas – helping to bring correct methods of struggle before the working class and so on". The fundamental ideology in Crawford's work is emphasised in this and hence Crawford worked in alliance with a number of groups in order to help provide the working class with equal opportunities.

=== Communist Party ===
With a strong belief in supporting the needs of the working class, Crawford was actively involved in the Communist Party of Australia (CPA). The party was formed in Sydney in October 1920, following the Russian Revolution. While the CPA never made a significant political challenge to the social order already established in Australia, it did however make an imprint on the trade unions, and help to establish and pioneer social movements. Crawford also contributed to the Eureka Youth League (EYL), which is an organisation associated with the CPA. According to the EYL constitution its objective was to unite all young fighters for socialism, to work and fight for a socialist Australia. Crawford also wrote the play called Refugee, which the EYL held a production for. The production was reported on in an article published on 11 November 1949. Crawford's participation in the CPA is highlighted by his invitation to the party's 40th anniversary celebration. Furthermore, the invitation reveals the ideology of the CPA where it says, "The Communist Party of Australia is a working class Party, having no interests separate and apart from those of the working class". Crawford also wrote a short sketch titled "The Remedy" in 1961, which was to be performed by New Theatre Club at their rallies, as a part of their election campaign.

=== Union of Australian Women ===
The Union of Australian Women was first started in Sydney in August 1950 and spread to other states quite quickly. In 1956 it was decided that a national organisation would be formed uniting each state branch. Many of the founding members included those who were communists, Australian Labor Party supporters, Christian activists and Members of the New Housewives Association. The main goals of the Union of Australian Women included "improving the status of women and children, disarmament and a halt to nuclear testing and mining, equal distribution of wealth, increased welfare services, equal pay for Indigenous Australians, abortion law reform, and opposition to the White Australia policy." Crawford also wrote the sketch titled "Bus Stop Sketch" for the Union of Australian Women, which is a discussion between three women about unequal pay.

=== Brisbane Realist Writers Group ===
The Realist Writers Group was a collective of writers, usually communists but also composed of left wing supporters and established in Australia in 1944. The first collective began in Melbourne and the movement spread to Brisbane in 1950, then to Sydney in 1952, Perth in 1960 and Newcastle in 1963. In 1960 a National Council of Groups was established to internationally link the branches with groups in New Zealand, Canada, the US and countries under communist rule. The Realist Writers intentions were defined by their constitution as 'literary organizations of the working class movement... to carry forward the revolutionary and democratic traditions of Australian literature'. The first published journal came from the Melbourne branch titled Realist Writer and appeared quarterly from March 1952 to April 1954 when it was incorporated into Overland. The first two issues were edited by Bill Wannan and by Stephen Murray-Smith for the next seven. Noteworthy contributors included David Martin, Frank Hardy, Laurence Collinson, John Manifold, John Morrison, Eric Lambert and Katharine Susannah Prichard. A version of the Realist Writer appeared from the Sydney branch in renewed form in 1958 edited by Frank Hardy and from 1960 appeared three times a year until the groups began to disintegrate in the 1970s. When the National Council of Groups was formed in 1960 the Realist Writer came under its responsibility. In 1964 the name was changed to The Realist! and from 1962 to 1970 was edited by Ray Williams. Its contributors included Len Fox, Wilma Hedley and Ron Tullipan.

Jim Crawford became a councillor for the National Council of Groups. On 2 February 1965 Ray Williams wrote to Crawford that after having conversations with Bill Sutton and Wilma and Lauria Hedley he had become aware of Crawford's career as a playwright and to his knowledge had already written 25 plays. Mr Williams invited Crawford to contribute to The Realist! as both a journalist and a playwright. "We should be most grateful if you should write an article for us – on any topic that suits you... Furthermore, I see no reason why we could not publish a portion of one of your plays, say an Act or a few scenes, at least." Crawford agreed to this and went on to also write reviews for other playwrights such as Mary Gilmore as well as write as a freelance journalist. Crawford was also chosen as one of the Queensland representations on the editorial board and the list was published in the Realist Writers magazine, issues 8 - March 1962.

=== Aboriginal rights ===
Crawford experienced first hand the working conditions of the Aboriginal people during the time he lived in Western Queensland, the gulf country and the Northern Territory. Lowenstein recalls an interview held with Crawford in which he describes working on cattle stations in Australia. He described to the interviewer how the cattle industry is built upon the torment and cruelty towards millions of animals, and of the exploitation of Aboriginal labour. However without the Aboriginal labour they would not have been able to run the stations. The Government had control over the Aboriginal people and forced them to work for free as well as forcing them to remain on the stations. After witnessing such injustice first hand, Crawford became involved in movements defending the rights of Aboriginal people. He wrote a number of articles predominantly for the Queensland Guardian regarding the rights of Indigenous Australians. His articles focused on a conference in Cairns on 1–2 December 1962, which Crawford attended. The conference was called together by the Cairns branch of the Aboriginal and Torres Strait Island Advancement League in order to create equal working conditions for Aboriginals.

== Bibliography ==
- "James Crawford" The Australian Dictionary of Biography
- Arrow, Michele. Upstaged: Australian Women Dramatists in the Limelight at Last., Sydney: Currency Press, 2002. Print.
- Brand, Mona. "A writer's thirty-six years in radical theatre: New Theatre's formative years 1932-1955 and their influence on Australian drama." Australian drama 1920-1955: papers presented to a conference at the University of New England, Arimdale, 1–4 September 1984. Arimdale: University of New England, 1986. 1–8. Print.
- Casey, Maryrose. Creating Frames: Contemporary Indigenous Theatre. St Lucia: University of Queensland Press, 2004. Print.
- Crawford, Jim. "Fighting program on key demands." Queensland Guardian[Brisbane] 12 Dec. 1962: 5. Print.
- Crawford, Jim. "Marlowe's Voice in Elizabethan Theatre." Queensland Guardian, Brisbane. 21 Oct. 1964: 4. Print.
- "Eureka Youth League." Reason in Revolt – Source Documents of Australia Radicalism Reason in Revolt Project, 7 Dec. 2004. Web. 14 May 2012.
- 'Eureka Youth League production of Refugee newspaper clipping', Papers of Jim Crawford, UQFL301, Box 2, Folder 2, Fryer Library, University of Queensland Library.
- Hatherell, William. "The Changing Face of Radicalism". The Third Metropolis. Brisbane: University of Queensland Press, 2007. 155–187. Print
- Healy, Connie, Crawford, James (Jim) (1908–1973), National Centre of Biography at Australian National University, n.d. Web, 2012. 29 March 2012
- Healy, Connie. Defiance: Political Theatre in Brisbane 1930-1962. Mount Nebo: Boombana Publications, 2000. Print.
- Jim Crawford, 'Jim Crawford biographical information', Jim Crawford Collection, UQFL 301, Box 3, Folder 1, Fryer Library, University of Queensland Library.
- Jim Crawford, 'Letter to Mary Murnane', Jim Crawford Collection, UQFL 301, Box 5, Folder 2, Fryer Library, University of Queensland Library.
- Joe Harris, 'Letter to Jim Crawford', Jim Crawford Collection, UQFL301, Box 3, Folder 6, Fryer Library, University of Queensland Library.
- Jim Crawford, 'List of plays by Jim Crawford', Jim Crawford Collection, UQFL 301, Box 1, Folder 1, Fryer Library, University of Queensland Library.
- Jim Crawford, 'Communist Party of Australia, invitation to Jim Crawford to the Party's 40th anniversary', Papers of Jim Crawford, UQFL301, Box 1, Folder 7, Fryer Library, University of Queensland Library.
- Jim Crawford, 'Papers; Realist Writers Group 1965 – 1970', Papers of Jim Crawford, UQFL301, Box 3, Folder 13, Fryer Library, University of Queensland Library.
- London Review of Books. To the End of the Line: Ferdinand Mount, London Review of Books, n.d. Web, 2011. 26 May 2012.
- Lowenstein, Wendy and Morag Loh. The Immigrants. Melbourne: Hyland House, 1977.
- Lowenstein, Wendy. Weevils in the flour. An Oral record of the 1930s depression in Australia. Melbourne: Hyland House, 1978. Print.
- Marshall, Alan. Alan Marshall's Battlers. Melbourne: Hyland House, 1983. Print.
- Notes on the history of New Theatre Australia. 2nd ed. Sydney: New Theatre Australia, 1959. Print.
- "Obituary Jim Crawford – Playwright of the Working Class." Socialist Party of Australia. 1 Feb. 1974: 7. Print.
- Parsons, Philip. Companion to Theatre in Australia. Sydney: Currency Press Ltd, 1995. Print.
- Piffard, Frederick. "Shifting Scenes." New Theatre Review. Sept/Oct 1946: 3. Print.
- Spotlight (National), 7.1 (June 1959) p. 7
- "Union of Australian Women." The Australian Women's Register. The University of Melbourne, and National Foundation for Australian Women, n.d. 2010. Web. 16 May 2012 http://www.womenaustralia.info/biogs/AWE0106b.htm
- Wilde, William H, Joy Hooton, and Barry Andrews. "Realist Writers Groups" Oxford Reference Online. 14 May 2012.
