= Wahine =

Wahine, the Hawaiian and Māori word for woman, can mean:

== People ==
- Alapaiwahine, Princess of the Island of Hawaii
- Kamauliwahine, “queen” (Aliʻi Nui) of Molokai
- Keākealaniwahine, a High Chiefess of the Island of Hawaii

== Goddess ==
- Kihe-Wahine, a Polynesian goddess

== Government ==
- Mana Wahine Te Ira Tangata, a New Zealand political party from 1998 to 2001

== Sports ==
- A female surfer
- A member of the University of Hawaiʻi at Mānoa's ladies sports teams, the Hawaii Rainbow Wahine

== Vessels ==
- Wahine (ship), any of several ships named Wahine
  - TSS Wahine (1913–51), a New Zealand inter-island ferry that also served in World War I and World War II
  - TEV Wahine, a 1966-built New Zealand inter-island passenger ferry that foundered in Wellington Harbour in 1968

== See also ==
- Vahine no te vi (Woman of the Mango), a painting by Paul Gauguin
- Wangaratta Wahine, a song by The Captain Matchbox Whoopee Band
