= Robert Stone =

Robert or Rob Stone may refer to:

== Medicine ==
- Robert King Stone (1822–1872), physician who served U.S. president Abraham Lincoln during the American Civil War
- Robert Spencer Stone (1895–1966), Canadian-American pioneer in radiology, radiation therapy and radiation protection
- Robert Stone (physician, born 1922) (1922–2016), American physician and director of the National Institutes of Health

== Music ==
- Robert Stone (composer) (1516–1614), English composer
- Robert J. Stone (1944–2009), Canadian music entrepreneur
- Rob Stone (businessman) (1968–2024), American music, media and branding executive
- Rob Stone (rapper) (born 1995), American rapper

== Sport ==
- Robert Stone (cricketer) (1749–1820), English amateur cricketer
- Robert Stone (rugby league) (1956–2005), Australian rugby league player for St. George Dragons
- Robert Stone (sprinter) (born 1965), Australian sprinter
- Robert Stone (wrestler) (born 1983), American professional wrestler
- Rob Stone (sportscaster) (born 1969), American sports commentator
- Robert Stone (basketball) (born 1987), Australian basketball player

== Others ==
- Robert Stone (attorney) (1866–1957), American attorney, speaker of the Kansas House of Representatives in 1915
- Robert Stone (British Army officer) (1890–1974), British general
- Robert Stone (silversmith) (1903–1990), English silversmith
- Robert Granville Stone (1907–2002), American philatelic scholar
- Robert L. Stone (1922–2009), American businessman, chief executive of The Hertz Corporation
- Robert Stone (novelist) (1937–2015), American author and journalist
- Robert Stone (trail guide writer) (born 1951), writer of hiking books
- Robert Stone (director), British-born American documentary director
- Rob Stone (actor) (born 1962), American actor and director
- Robert Stone (architect) (born 1968), American architect
