= Eric L. Stewart =

Australian artist (1903–1970)

Eric Lewis Stewart
- The Legend of the Everlasting Water, c. 1965
- Born: 1907; West Hotham, (Note: Now North Melbourne.) Victoria
- Died: May 19, 1970 (aged 62–63); St Leonards, New South Wales
- Occupations: Painter, night watchman
- Years active: c. 1950-1970
- Known for: Aboriginal legends rendered in the style of folk expressionism
- Notable work: The Lazy Goannas; Legend of the Everlasting Water

Signature
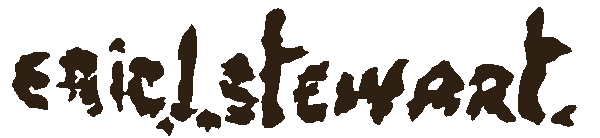

Eric Lewis Stewart (1907–1970) was an Australian outsider painter from Melbourne. Described as an “exile from any arts community”, he worked prolifically but in obscurity, painting privately in his own home while working as a night watchman. His merit was recognised posthumously by the Australian painter Clifton Pugh, who discovered his paintings in a junk shop and subsequently organised exhibitions for the late artist. Stewart was self-taught but was regarded by critics as an aberration in genre of naïve art, with some noting his works were more visually aligned with expressionism. Although he was not Aboriginal, Stewart's work drew primarily on Australian Aboriginal mythology.

== Biography ==
Little is known about the life of Eric L. Stewart. He was born in 1907 in Melbourne. (Note: Victorian Births Deaths and Marriages Register. Some sources state a birth year of 1903) Accounts described him as a quiet, uneducated and jovial man. Over the course of his life he held a range of trades, including farmer, butcher, bricklayer and wood merchant. In 1935 he married his partner Elvira, and the couple had three daughters. They lived in the vicinity of Hughesdale.

During the 1940s, Stewart suffered from tuberculosis and spent around five years in a sanatorium. While there, he developed an interest in Aboriginal mythology, from books he encountered in the hospital library. He was encouraged to attend art classes at the sanatorium but declined, saying that he knew more about painting than the instructor. A feature article in Art & Australia suggested that Stewart became intensely absorbed in the mythology, describing him as “completely captured” by the subject to the extent that he would withdraw into his studio, a simple shed at the back of his house, and “almost lose touch with the outside world of wife, children and suburbia”. He worked prolifically and is estimated to have produced around five hundred paintings. Many were presumed lost, discarded, or sold for their frames alone. Apart from meagre private sales, Stewart did not attempt to exhibit his work in public during his lifetime.

According to his daughters, Stewart was employed as a night watchman with the Postmaster-General's Department in Hughesdale for several decades. He continued working until only months before his death. On medical advice, he and his wife relocated to Woy Woy, New South Wales. Stewart died from complications related to a blood disorder on 19 May 1970 at Royal North Shore Hospital in Sydney.

== Posthumous discovery ==
Several of Stewart's works were discovered by artist Clifton Pugh in a junk shop in Echuca, Victoria in early 1972. He had been accompanying the Victorian Labor Party leader Clyde Holding on a regional campaign tour. Pugh and Holding filled the government car with Stewart's dust-covered paintings.

Pugh publicly declared the unknown artist Eric L. Stewart to be a “primitive genius” in an article in Melbourne's The Age, expressing a desire to find him and help him. Pugh subsequently spent considerable time trying to locate him through print and broadcast media. Believing Stewart to be a country Victorian Aboriginal artist, Pugh traveled extensively and without success trying to follow up on leads.

Clifton Pugh had a raised profile at the time, having just won his second Archibald Prize for his portrait of Gough Whitlam. More of Stewart's paintings emerged following Pugh's publicity. It transpired that a Melbourne auction house had sold hundreds as a job lot, some months before Stewart's death in 1970, and that they were already widely disseminated. A short-term spike in private art market interest for Stewart's paintings coincided with the media attention.

News of Stewart's identity and death was revealed by one of his daughters, who contacted the newspaper The Sun following the publicity. Pugh expressed regret that Stewart had died in obscurity, but nevertheless proceeded to organise an exhibition of his works at Melbourne's Powell Street Gallery, opening in March 1972, and a second exhibition at Sydney's Macquarie Galleries in November 1972.

== Work and influences ==
Most of Eric Stewart's surviving paintings were of subjects drawn from Aboriginal cultural practices, hunting, mythology and Dreamtime narratives. According to naïve art broker Bianca McCullough, he initially attempted to conform to traditional painting conventions, until he was given a diagnosis of terminal illness around 1967. From then on his painting approach became highly individualistic.

Stewart did not seem to paint for an audience aside from himself. Perhaps this lack of concern for the art market helps to explain why such expressive paintings were initially discovered in a second-hand shop.

— Retrospective of Australian naïve art (2004)

Stewart was not Aboriginal, and the limited biographical information published at the time of his rediscovery did not indicate what his connection was to the subjects he painted. Handwritten notes on the reverse of Stewart's paintings indicate that his references on Aboriginal mythology came from published sources, including Myths and Legends of the Australian Aborigines (1930) by William Ramsay Smith, (Note: Myths and Legends of the Australian Aborigines drew heavily on material compiled by David Unaipon, Australia’s first published Indigenous author, who was not credited in the original publication.) Brown Men and Red Sand (1948) by Charles Mountford, and Aboriginal Myths and Legends (1966) by Roland Robinson. The standard reference McCulloch's Encyclopaedia of Australian Art describes Stewart as an “interpreter” of Aboriginal legends rather than a practitioner of Aboriginal art.

Stylistically, Stewart used a rich impasto and a palette of subtle earth colours. His compositions were complex and fluid, characterised by sweeping brushstrokes and interlocking curved forms. Stewart's paintings were found in poor condition due to their technical limitations. Canvases were poorly stretched, poorly primed, and he worked with non-professional paints that became clogged during application and cracked as they dried.

== Critical appraisal ==
Although Stewart's subject matter drew on Aboriginal mythology, critics did not consider his visual style to be derived from Aboriginal art. Alan McCulloch observed that Stewart's stylistic confidence appeared too developed for him to be considered a true naïve painter. James Gleeson compared his painting methods to European expressionism, while Patrick McCaughey described them as “folk expressionism”. Poet and arts writer Barrie Reid noted possible affinities with Gauguin and speculated whether Stewart may have had any awareness of, or contact with, Australian modernist Danila Vassilieff.

Critics also observed a psychological intensity in Stewart's paintings. McCaughey characterised them as “agitated” and “hard-going”; a release of a “visual maelstrom”. Reid described the works as “quite powerful and demanding”, while a recent retrospective of Australian naïve art noted their “raw” and “expressive intensity”. McCulloch felt they were “highly charged with emotional content”, while Rodney Milgate described them as “gut proclamations” that were “sensitive to the point of pain”. By contrast, Donald Brook felt they were the “clumsy” and “muddy” paintings of Aboriginal legends by an old odd-job man, of which future owners will have to explain to their puzzled guests.

== Exhibitions ==
- Paintings by the late Eric L. Stewart (1972) Village Art, Toorak.
- Eric L. Stewart (1972) Powell Street Gallery, Melbourne.
- Eric L. Stewart (1972) Macquarie Galleries, Sydney.
- The Innocent Eye - an exhibition of work by naive painters (1976) Benalla Art Gallery, Benalla.
- Raw and Compelling. Australian Naive Art - the continuing tradition (2004) Swan Hill Regional Art Gallery, Swan Hill (touring).

== Collections ==
Works by Eric L. Stewart are held in the permanent collections of the, National Gallery of Australia, La Trobe University and the University of Melbourne.
