= Wangaratta Wahine =

Studio album by The Captain Matchbox Whoopee Band
- Released: 1974
- Recorded: Armstrong Studios, Melbourne
- Genre: Blues / Rock / Jazz
- Length: 42:04
- Label: Image Records
- Producer: Ern Rose

The Captain Matchbox Whoopee Band chronology
Smoke Dreams (1973)	Wangaratta Wahine (1974)	Australia (1975)

Wangaratta Wahine is the second album by Australian band The Captain Matchbox Whoopee Band, released in 1974. It was recorded at Armstrong Studios in Melbourne, and the cover art was by Australian artist Michael Leunig.

== Track listing ==
Side one
No.	Title	Length
1.	"Blues My Naughtie Sweetie Gives To Me"	3:08
2.	"Lovesick Blues"	4:07
3.	"Half A Moon (Is Better Than No Moon)"	3:12
4.	"Jug Band Music"	3:55
5.	"Wait For Me Juanita"	4:48
6.	"Top Hat"	3:41

Side two
No.	Title	Length
1.	"If Youse A Viper"	2:54
2.	"That's What The Bird Said To Me"	1:54
3.	"Wangaratta Wahine"	5:33
4.	"Flamin' May"	2:53
5.	"Your Feet's Too Big"	2:45
6.	"Hernando's Hideaway"	3:14

== Charts ==
Chart (1975)	Peak position
Australia (Kent Music Report)	14

== Personnel ==
- Mic Conway: vocals, washboard, phonograph, horn, ukulele, jug
- Jim Conway: harmonica, kazoo, whistles, vocals
- Fred Olbrei: violin, vocals
- Dave Flett: bass, vocals, harmonies, ukulele
- Geoff Hales: drums, washboard, tap dancing
- Jim Niven: keyboards
- Mick Fleming: banjo, mandolin
- Jon Snyder: guitar
