= Aubrey Gibson =

Australian businessman

- Born: Aubrey Hickes Lawson Gibson; 4 May 1901
- Died: 26 March 1973 (aged 71)
- Occupation: businessman
- Known for: art collection and patronage

Aubrey Hickes Lawson Gibson (4 May 1901 – 26 March 1973) was an Australian businessman, arts patron and art collector. Born and educated in Melbourne, Gibson became a successful businessman in the city, establishing his own company, A.H. Gibson Industries, which was listed on the stock exchange in the 1950s. He was also a director of other major manufacturers and distributors, including Volkswagen Australasia and Hoover Australia.

Gibson is notable for his services to the arts. He maintained a substantial private art collection. He was a founding director of the Australian Elizabethan Theatre Trust and of the National Trust of Australia, and deputy-chairman of the National Gallery of Victoria.

== Personal ==
Gibson was born on 4 May 1901 in Kew, Melbourne. The third child of Scottish business manager John Gibson and English born wife Ellen née Lawson, he was schooled at Melbourne Grammar and the University of Melbourne. He briefly studied art at the National Gallery of Victoria drawing school, but concluded that art was not his vocation. He said of that time that "with little resistance I allowed myself to be guided into commercial fields".

He married twice, with children from both marriages. His first wife was Marjorie Isabel Kimpton, whom he married in Melbourne on 3 February 1930, and with whom he had a daughter and a son. They were later divorced, and on 19 September 1947 in Colombo he remarried to Gertrude Jean Balfour, with whom he also had a son. Gibson lived in Hopetoun Rd, Toorak, Victoria for much of his life, but toward the end of his career he maintained a residence in Arthur Circle, Forrest in Canberra.

Gibson died on 26 March 1973, survived by his second wife and a child of each of his marriages.

== Professional career ==
Gibson pursued a successful business career. He worked as a salesman for Hoover products. In January 1933 he established his own company A.H. Gibson (Electrical), which was a distributor of electrical appliances and parts. He also spent some time working in New York. His company became A.H. Gibson Industries Ltd, and was listed on the stock exchange from 1949 to 1959, during which period he was chairman and managing director. Gibson also held other directorships, most notably of Volkswagen Australasia from 1961 to 1967 and Hoover Australia from 1964 to 1970. An active member of Victoria's wider business community in the 1940s, he was President of the Electricity and Radio Federation of Victoria (1947–1949) and President of the Institute of Sales and Business Management (1946–1949).

Gibson's business interests were complemented by other activities, including farming land at Berwick, Victoria.

Gibson was active in what is now the army reserve. He was made a lieutenant in the Melbourne University Rifles in 1922, and by the time of World War II had risen to the rank of major in the reserves. Seconded to the Second Australian Imperial Force on 13 May 1940, Gibson served in Australia and in the middle east (1940–1942), where he performed adjutant and quartermaster-general duties. He was made a lieutenant-colonel in the Reserve of Officers on 13 May 1945, and was made honorary colonel when placed on the retired list in 1951.

== Collecting and commissioning works of art ==
The cover of Gibson's only book, The Rosebowl, illustrates his interests in the arts

Although his career as an artist was fleeting, Gibson's career as a patron and lover of art was lifelong. In the 1950s and 1960s Gibson made major contributions to the arts in Australia, both as a collector and a patron of arts organisations. He acquired the works of some of Australia's most highly regarded artists, such as Russell Drysdale, Albert Tucker and John Brack. Other artists well represented in his collection included Noel Counihan, John Passmore, Clifton Pugh, Arnold Shore and Clive Stephen.

As a collector, Gibson's tastes were eclectic. At the same time as acquiring paintings by "the younger Australian painters" of his time, he was also collecting antique English silver. This led one writer to exclaim of his collection that "it must surely cover more ground than almost any other private one in this country". Toward the end of his life the collection included over 560 items from artists of over 30 countries. His fascination with silver also led him to spend time during a visit to Europe in 1952, learning from the British silversmith Robert Stone how silverware was made. This was an experience recounted in Gibson's only book The Rosebowl, so named because of a commission Gibson sought of Stone.

The Rosebowl was an account of a trip around the world taken by Gibson and his wife in 1951. It described his visits to cultural institutions and contained ruminations on cultural collections policy. Reflecting on the damage caused by World War II to cultural artifacts, art and architecture, he advocated a wide distribution of works of art around the world, to afford them greater protection. He was to have an opportunity to pursue these views in later roles with the National Gallery of Victoria.

The silver rosebowl was one of a range of works commissioned by Gibson. Others included three portraits of himself: one by Manx artist Bryan Kneale, one by Australian artist Noel Counihan, and a sketch by Archibald Prize-winning artist Louis Kahan, this last being in the University of Melbourne's Clem Christesen collection.

== Gibson and the arts in Australia ==
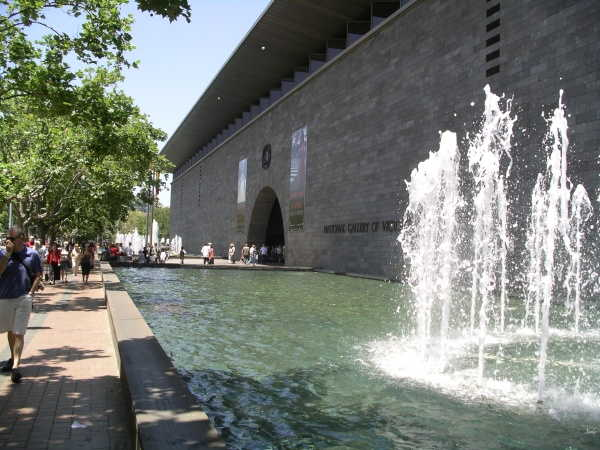
The National Gallery of Victoria building, the design and construction of which was commissioned during Gibson's membership of the Board of Trustees

Gibson actively supported many Australian arts organisations. He was director of the Australian Elizabethan Theatre Trust at its foundation in 1954, as well as being its Victorian chairman from 1955 to 1967, and president from 1968 to 1971. The Trust was instrumental in the foundation of major Australian arts institutions including Opera Australia, orchestras in Sydney and Melbourne, and the National Institute of Dramatic Arts.

Gibson was variously trustee, treasurer and deputy chairman of the National Gallery of Victoria (NGV) in the period 1956 to 1964. The NGV was Australia's oldest public gallery, its acquisitions largely funded by the massive but dwindling Felton Bequest. Gibson was one of several new faces brought to the Gallery's board at a critical time: the Victorian government had announced a decision to build a new National Gallery in Melbourne, and governance of the existing institution was undergoing significant upheaval. Gibson was reported to be "always a man of strong opinions", bringing a robust and blunt character to some of the meetings of the Gallery's trustees. The trustees were concerned that the substantial resources of the institution's rich Felton Bequest were not being applied effectively to ensure the representation of contemporary schools of art in the Gallery's collection.

Seeking to directly support the NGV, Gibson financed the purchase of works by and for the Gallery, as well as making his personal collection available for exhibition. He provided a donation in 1962 allowing the NGV to purchase the Clement Meadmore sculpture Duolith III. Gibson purchased Tom Roberts' major painting Coming South, for $20000, presenting it to the NGV in 1967. A selection from Gibson's extensive personal collection was presented as an NGV exhibition in 1969.

Gibson played many other roles in the arts, through societies of artists, of collectors, and through boards of which he was a member as a result of his involvement with the Australian Elizabethan Theatre Trust. These included Deputy Chairman of the Melbourne Theatre Company from 1960 to 1968.

He was a foundation member of the National Trust of Australia (Victoria) in 1955, and co-founded the Society of Collectors of Fine Arts.
