= The Captain Matchbox Whoopee Band =

Australian jug band

- Also known as: Soapbox Circus; Matchbox; Captain Matchbox Reignited
- Origin: Melbourne, Victoria, Australia
- Genres: Jug band; pop; jazz
- Years active: 1969–1980; 2010–2012
- Labels: Image; Festival; Mushroom
- Past members: see #Members
- Website: captainmatchbox.com

The Captain Matchbox Whoopee Band, also known as Soapbox Circus or Matchbox, were an Australian jug band formed in 1969. It centred on Mic Conway ("Captain Matchbox") on lead vocals, washboard and ukulele; and his brother, Jim Conway, on harmonica, kazoo and vocals. They issued four studio albums, Smoke Dreams (June 1973), Wangaratta Wahine (late 1974), Australia (November 1975) and Slightly Troppo (1978), before they disbanded in September 1980. The Conway brothers reformed the group in 2010 as Captain Matchbox Reignited and disbanded again two years later.

In October 2010, Smoke Dreams was listed in the book, 100 Best Australian Albums.

== History ==
=== 1969-1973: Formation & Smoke Dreams ===
The Captain Matchbox Whoopee Band were formed in Melbourne in 1969 as a jug band by Mic Conway on lead vocals, washboard and ukulele; his brother, Jim Conway on harmonica, kazoo and vocals; Mick Fleming on banjo, mandolin, guitar and vocals; Dave Hubbard on guitar; David Isom on guitar and vocals; Jeffrey Cheesman on guitar and vocals; Inge de Koster on violin; and John McDiarmid on tea-chest bass and flute. David Isom, Jeffrey Cheesman, Inge de Koster and John McDiarmid were later replaced by Peter Inglis on guitar and vocals; Jim Niven on piano; and Peter Scott on tea chest bass.

Inspired by early jazz recordings and jug band music they heard on reel-to-reel tapes and 78s as teenagers, the Conways formed the Jellybean Jug Band while secondary students at Camberwell High School. After they left school, in 1969, they formed the Captain Matchbox Whoopee Band, which grew from an underground art school band to a national icon, with film and television appearances and regular appearances in the charts. Australian musicologist, Ian McFarlane, opined, "one of the most unusual aggregations ever assembled in Australia, [they] played jug-band blues enlivened with sideshow entertainment and vaudeville lunacy." They also played live at the T. F. Much Ballroom, run by John Pinder.

During 1971 they appeared as themselves in Tim Burstall's comedy feature film, Stork. They signed with Image Records and issued their debut single, "My Canary Has Circles Under His Eyes" (written by Jack Golden, Ted Koehler and Edward Pola), which is a cover version of Irish-born English band leader, Debroy Somers' 1931 original. Captain Matchbox's version reached No. 35 on the Go-Set National Top 40 in November 1972. Their follow up single, "I Can't Dance (Got Ants in My Pants)" (April 1973), did not chart.

The Captain Matchbox Whoopee Band's debut album, Smoke Dreams (June 1973), reached the Go-Set Australian Albums Top 20. McFarlane observed that it consisted entirely of "1930s and 1940s jazz, blues and jug-band standards." It was also released in the US via ESP-Disk label, in the DynaQuad quadraphonic format. AllMusic's reviewer, arwulf arwulf, rated it at four-and-a-half stars out of five and explained, "this frowsy little group specialized in popular novelty, jazz and blues songs dating from the 1920s and '30s, whipping themselves into a frenzy over vintage delights."

In November 1973 the group's line-up was the Conway brothers, Fleming and Niven with Dave Flett on electric bass, slide dobro, backing vocals and ukulele (ex-Lipp and the Double Dekker Brothers); Geoff Hales on drums and washboard; and Fred Olbrei on violin and vocals. Jon Snyder joined on guitar early in the following year.

=== 1974-1975: Wangaratta Wahine & Australia ===
The Captain Matchbox Whoopee Band released a second studio album, Wangaratta Wahine (late 1974), which was produced by Ern Rose at Armstrong Studios. It had a cover illustration by Australian cartoonist, Michael Leunig. It provided the singles, "Your Feets Too Big" (early 1974), "Hernando's Hideaway" (July 1974) and "Wangaratta Wahine" (1974). Basil of Tharunka caught their performance in early May 1974, he felt, "[the group] epitomised the 20s, Prohibition and flappers... [with their] cunning combination of the camp, the serious, the brilliant, the hilarious, did once again what they do better than any other band in the country: entertain their audience unrelentingly."

They appeared in one of the December 1974 episodes of the ABC's new music show "Countdown", performing "Hernando's Hideaway". In March 1975 the group appeared on ABC-TV's pop music show, Countdown, to perform the latter single. The track is an original, written by Mic Conway and Flett. Tony Wright of The Sydney Morning Herald, in June 2013, lamented the modification of the Hume Highway and its bypass of the city of Wangaratta; he recalled how, "Wangaratta and its highway culture was captured forever by the marvellously whacky [group]... The title song, held together by a wailing mouth organ, was dedicated to a waitress in a late-night roadhouse restaurant ('My Wahine in Wang'). I'm pretty sure I visited the very same roadhouse, for a plastic palm tree is described within the lyrics, though who could be sure? There were roadhouses like that all up and down the Hume once." In August 1975 the album peaked at No. 14 on the Kent Music Report Albums Chart.

During 1975 Fleming and Hales left and were replaced by Chris Worrall (ex-The Pelaco Brothers) on guitar and Manny Paterakis on drums. The group were signed to Mushroom Records and released their third album, Australia, in that year. McFarlane found, "it was an entertaining mix of originals and covers." Tony Catterall of The Canberra Times noticed that one way the group, "maintains total absorption is by pretending to be a band of brilliant musicians justifiably despatched to a lunatic asylum and which plays at the next-door sleazy nightclub, which the other inmates also attend... It's hard to pick favourites but the title track is a gem: full of pomp and cracked trumpets blaring after its military beat, and both an ocker's anthem and the first impressions the archetypal, Crass Texas Millionaire has of Australia."

In December they supported Skyhooks on that group's In the Heat of the Night Tour, after which Catterall surmised the Captain Matchbox Whoopee Band, "is unlikely to reach the sales position of the Hooks, [but] it too is a proven winner."

=== 1976-1980: Name changes, Slightly Troppo and break up ===
In 1976 the group continued through line-up changes first with Olbrei, Paterakis and Worrall replaced by Jack Sara, Graeme Isaac and Gordon McLean, respectively. Soon after Niven left to form a rock band, the Sports.

The group were renamed the Soapbox Circus, and were incorporated into the Australian Performing Group (APG). Flett left, while Rick Ludbrook on guitar and saxophone and Peter Muhleisen on bass guitar joined the line-up to record a live album, The Great Stumble Forward (1976). They performed in a musical theatre play, Smackin' the Dacks, at the Pram Factory Front Theatre, Carlton from 17 November to 24 December 1977. The musicians were the Conway brothers, Ludbrook, McLean and Muhleisen joined by Tony Burkys and Colin Stevens.

By 1978 the band were renamed Matchbox with the Conway brothers, Ludbrook, McLean, Muhleisen, Burkys on guitar (ex-Original Battersea Heroes) and Stephen Cooney on guitar (ex-Phil Manning Band), who was soon replaced by Louis McManus (ex-Bushwackers). The musical theatre component, Soapbox Circus, were incorporated into Circus Oz. Matchbox issued a studio album, Slightly Troppo (1978), which delivered two singles. The Canberra Times' Luis Feliu felt, "There seems to be more emphasis on polish compared with previous material; more of that Matchbox spirit and wit, send-ups as usual (less hard-core political though – the cause seems to be lost)." He claimed, "[they are] by far the best good-time jug band in Australia, which leads me to point out that it's a truly resilient band, having covered so many campuses and rock venues throughout Australia."

Matchbox appeared in Burstall's feature film, Dimboola (1979), performing the track, "The Sheik of Araby. By mid-year the line-up of the Conways, McManus and Muhleisen had been joined by Chris Coyne on saxophone and flute, Eric McCusker on guitar and Robert Ross on drums (ex-Manning). They performed "a more rock-oriented sound." A truck crash while on tour in 1979 ruined the band financially and emotionally and, after paying off their debts, they disbanded in September 1980. Their final single, "Juggling Time", had been released early in 1980 which was recorded by Matchbox Band with the line-up of the Conways, Coyne, McCusker, McManus, Muhleisen and Ross.

=== 1990-present: Reformations ===
In 1994, The band performed at the Continental hotel in Melbourne, which was recorded and received a limited released on cassette.

The band reformed in 1996 for the Port Fairy Folk Festival, and again in 2010 under the name "Captain Matchbox Re-Ignited" for the Woodford Folk Festival, with shows at Bluesfest and Sydney and Melbourne. Members: Mic Conway, Jim Conway, Jeremy Cook, Don Hopkins, Phil Donnison, Cazzbo Johns, Jess Green and George Washingmachine. In October 2010, Smoke Dreams (1973) was listed in the book, 100 Best Australian Albums.

=== 1980-represent: Solo ventures ===
Mic Conway continued to record and perform regularly, both as a solo artist and with his National Junk Band. Jim Conway worked on many musical projects and became a sought-after session and backing musician, however due to the onset of multiple sclerosis, his health (but not his playing) was significantly affected and in early 2014 he retired.

Chris Worrall was the founding guitarist of Melbourne-based pub rockers, the Bleeding Hearts, in 1976, and joined Paul Kelly & the Dots in February 1979. Manny Paterakis was the founding drummer in Mike Rudd & the Heaters in 1979. Eric McCusker joined Mondo Rock on guitar in April 1980. Three ex-members went on to play with political rockers, Redgum: Gordon McLean was studio drummer from 1978 to 1979, Dave Flett played bass guitar from 1980 to 1983, and on his departure Stephen Cooney joined on bass guitar, didgeridoo and banjo from 1984 to 1985. Louis McManus joined Adelaide-based reggae rockers, No Fixed Address, on guitar in 1984. Peter Inglis joined the original Skyhooks in 1973.

== Discography ==
=== Studio albums ===
List of albums, with Australian chart positions
Title	Album details	Peak chart positions
Title	Album details	AUS
Smoke Dreams	Released: June 1973; Format: LP; Label: Image (ILP-724)	20
Wangaratta Wahine	Released: November 1974; Format: LP; Label: Image (ILP-744)	14
Australia	Released: 1975; Format: LP, Cassette; Label: Mushroom Records (L 35723)	-
Slightly Troppo	Released:1978; Format: LP, Cassette; Label: Mushroom Records (L 36579)	-

=== Live albums ===
List of albums
Title	Album details
The Great Stumble Forward (by the Soapbox Circus and the APG)	Released: 1976; Format: LP; Label: Mushroom Records (L 36245); Note: Live stage show recording featuring members of The Captain Matchbox Whoopee Band and The Australian Performing Group.
Live at the Continental	Released: 1994; Format: Cassette; Label: Captain Matchbox Whoopee Band; Note: Recorded Live at the Continental, Greville St Prahran on 27 October 1994
Reignited Tour - Live at Ormond Hall 2011	Released: 1 May 2020; Format: Digital download, streaming, CD (limited); Label: Ian Bowles, Black Box Records/ MGM Distribution; Note: Recorded Live at Ormond Hall, 2011

=== Compilation albums ===
List of albums
Title	Album details
Makin' Whoopee	Released: 1976; Format: LP; Label: Image (ILP-4915)
The Best of Captain Matchbox Whoopee Band	Released: 16 March 2018; Format: CD, Digital download, streaming; Label: Image, Sony Music Australia (19075827872)

=== Extended plays ===
List of EPs
Title	Album details
Matchbox Madness	Released: 1974; Format: LP; Label: Image (IEP-4)

=== Singles ===
List of singles, with Australian chart positions
Year	Title	Peak chart positions	Album
Year	Title	AUS	Album
1972	"My Canary Has Circles Under His Eyes"	33	Smoke Dreams
1973	"I Can't Dance (Got Ants in My Pants)"	-	Smoke Dreams
1974	"Your Feets Too Big"	-	Wangaratta Wahine
1974	"Hernando's Hideaway"	-	Wangaratta Wahine
1974	"Wangaratta Wahine"	-	Wangaratta Wahine
1976	"Australia"	-	Australia
1977	"If I Can't Have Anna in Cuba (I Think I'll Si-Esta in Spain)" (by Soapbox Circus)	-	The Great Stumble Forward
1978	"Sleep" (by Matchbox)	-	Slightly Troppo
1980	Juggling Time" /"Dirty Money" (by Matchbox band)	-	non album single

=== Other appearances ===
- "Roll that Reefer", "The Prefect", "Out in the Suburbs" on A Reefer Derci by Various Artists (1976)

== Members ==
- Jim Conway – lead vocals, harmonica, kazoo, whistles (1969–80, 1996, 2010–12)
- Mic Conway – vocals, washboard, phonograph, horn, ukulele, jug (1969–80, 1996, 2010–12)
- Mick Fleming – vocals, lead guitar, banjo, mandolin (1969–73)
- David Hubbard – vocals, guitar (1969–73)
- Bruce McNicol - harmonica, kazoo, washboard, piano, vocals, guitar (1969 - 71)
- R Inglis – vocals, guitar (1969–73)
- Tony Dunn, primary jug (1969–72)
- Jim Niven – keyboards, piano, pedal organ (1969–76)
- Peter Scott – tea-chest bass, jug (1969–73)
- Dave Flett – vocals, electric bass, backing vocals, ukulele, slide dobro (1973–76)
- Geoff Hales – drums, washboard, tap dancing (1973–75)
- Fred Olbrei – vocals, violin (1973–76)
- Jon Snyder – guitar (1974)
- Manny Paterakis – drums, washboard (1974–76)
- Chris Worrall – banjo, mandolin, guitar, vocals (1975–76)
- Graeme Isaac – drums, washboard (1976–77)
- Rick Ludbrook – guitar, saxophone, vocals (1976–78)
- Gordon McLean – banjo, mandolin, guitar, drums, vocals (1976–78)
- Peter Muhleisen – bass guitar (1976–80)
- Jack Sara – violin, vocals (1976)
- Colin Stevens – mandolin, blues harp (1976–77)
- Tony Burkys – guitar, bouzouki (1978–79)
- Stephen Cooney – guitar (1978)
- Louis McManus – guitars, fiddle, mandolin, banjo (1978–80)
- Chris Coyne – saxophone, flute (1979–80)
- Eric McCusker – guitar (1979–80)
- Robert Ross – drums (1979–80)
- Peter Martin – guitar (1980)
- Jeffrey Cheesman – vocals, guitar
- Inge de Koster – violin
- Dave Isom – vocals, guitar
- John McDiarmid – tea-chest bass, jug, flute
- Jeremy Cook, Don Hopkins, Phil Donnison, Cazzbo Johns, Jess Green, George Washingmachine (2010)

Credits
