= Wahine (ship) =

Wahine may refer to two ships of the Union Steam Ship Company of New Zealand:

- TSS Wahine (1913–51), a New Zealand inter-island ferry that also served as a minelayer in World War I and as a troopship in World War II
- TEV Wahine (1966–68), a New Zealand inter-island ferry that foundered at the entrance to Wellington Harbour in 1968 with the loss of 53 lives.
