= Hazel Edwards =

Australian author

Hazel Edwards OAM
- Born: 1945 (age 80–81); Melbourne, Victoria, Australia
- Occupation: Novelist
- Writing career
- Notable awards: 2009 ASA Medal

Hazel Edwards (born 1945) is an Australian author of children's literature. She was awarded the Australian Society of Authors' ASA Medal in 2009.

== Early life and education ==
Melbourne-born and based, Hazel Edwards attended Ashburton Primary and Camberwell High School, graduating in 1961.

== Career ==
After working in a bank and studying at night, Edwards entered Toorak Teachers' College. She taught at Westall High School and was invited to lecture at Frankston Teachers' College while studying at Monash University at night. Later she lectured in children's literature and psychology at Toorak Teachers' College, and the Institute of Early Childhood Development, then became a freelance author-lecturer after the publication of 'General Store' (1977) and There's a Hippopotamus On Our Roof Eating Cake (1980) which toured nationally with Garry Ginivan productions as 'Hippo Hippo the Musical' (2016).

As 2001 Australian Antarctic Division writer, awarded the Antarctic Fellowship, Edwards travelled to Casey Station, Antarctica on the Polar Bird. Literary output based on her experience includes Antarctica's Frozen Chosen (a young adult eco-thriller), Antarctic Writer on Ice (her expedition diary), Antarctic Dad (a picture book), Right or Wrong (a play co-written with fellow author Goldie Alexander), Grandma Leaps the Antarctic (an Auslan-signed DVD) and Antarctic Closeup, a National Museum initiative.

Edwards was a 2012 National Year of Reading Ambassador, and has been a director on the Australian Society of Authors’ board.

In 2010, Edwards wrote the young adult novel f2m; the boy within with co-author Ryan Kennedy about transitioning from female to male. In 2018, she launched her book Like Me about a child involved in the Yarra Plenty Regional Library's literacy program "Doggy Tales". Her 2016 novel Hijabi Girl, co-written with Ozge Allan, is about a diverse group of school friends in modern Australia, and has been turned into a musical puppet show.

== Awards and honours ==
- 2009 ASA Medal (Australian Society of Authors)
- 2013 Order of Australia Medal for services to literature
- 2017 YABBA Graham Davey citation for mentoring young readers and writers
- 2018 Edwards appointed Patron of Society of Women Writers; Victoria https://www.swwvic.org.au
- 2022 Distinguished Alumni for Education, Monash University

== Published works ==
=== Cake Eating Hippo series ===
- There's a Hippopotamus on our Roof Eating Cake (1980)
- My Hippopotamus is on our Caravan Roof Getting Sunburnt (1989)
- Hey Hippopotamus, Do Babies Eat Cake Too? (1992)
- Look, There's a Hippopotamus in the Playground Eating Cake (1994)
- Guess What? There's A Hippopotamus on the Hospital Roof Eating Cake (1997)
- Our Cake Eating Hippo Plays : Four Plays (1997)
- Hand Me Down Hippo (2004)
- Hooray! There's a Hippopotamus on Our Roof Having a Birthday Party (2010)
- Ho!Ho!Ho! There's a Hippopotamus on Our Roof Eating Christmas Cake (2018)

=== Antarctica-related works ===
- Antarctic Dad Kipas Books re-issue 2018
- Antarctica's Frozen Chosen
- Antarctic Writer on Ice
- Right or Wrong? Plays that make you think
- Antarctic Closeup in Making Tracks series

=== YA Novel ===
- Wasted? (2024)

=== Works in collections ===
The National Centre for Australian Children's Literature has a finding aid for Edwards, which includes a detailed bibliography.

- Lu Rees Archives (University of Canberra)
- Astrid Lindgren Memorial Award (ALMA)
