= Clifton Pugh =

Australian artist

Clifton Pugh AO
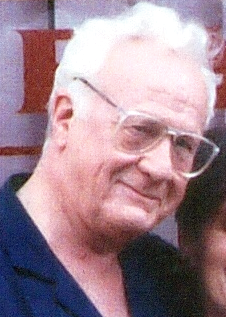
- Pugh in 1989
- Born: Clifton Ernest Pugh; 17 December 1924; Richmond, Victoria, Australia
- Died: 14 October 1990 (aged 65); Prahran, Victoria, Australia
- Years active: 1941−1990
- Known for: Painting, Printmaking
- Awards: Officer of the Order of Australia; Archibald Prize 1965, 1971 and 1972

Clifton Ernest Pugh AO (17 December 1924 – 14 October 1990) was an Australian artist and three-time winner of Australia's Archibald Prize. One of Australia's most renowned and successful painters, Pugh was strongly influenced by German Expressionism, and was known for his landscapes and portraiture. Important early group exhibitions include The Antipodeans, the exhibition for which Bernard Smith drafted a manifesto in support of Australian figurative painting, an exhibition in which Arthur Boyd, David Boyd, John Brack, Robert Dickerson, John Perceval and Charles Blackman showed; a joint exhibition with Barry Humphries, in which the two responded to Dadaism; and Group of Four at the Victorian Artists Society Gallery with Pugh, John Howley, Don Laycock and Lawrence Daws.

Pugh was made an Officer of the Order of Australia (AO) in the 1985 Australia Day Honours List for service to Australian art. In 1990 he was appointed as the Australian War Memorial's official artist at the 75th anniversary celebrations of the Gallipoli landing.

== Early life ==
Pugh was born in Richmond, Victoria, one of three, to English-born Thomas Owen Pugh, an assistant mechanical engineer, and Adelaide born wife Violet Odgen (née Cook). Both Pugh's parents were amateur painters, and as a young man during the 1940s Pugh attended evening classes at the Swinburne Technical College to study cartoon drawing. Two years later, whilst living in Adelaide, he took evening classes in life drawing at the South Australian School of Arts and Crafts.

Pugh served with the Australian Imperial Force in New Guinea during World War II and with the British Commonwealth Occupation Force in Japan after the war. A group of Japanese soldiers surrendered to the unit with which Pugh was fighting during a lull in fighting. On receiving orders to proceed, Pugh (and possibly others) tortured, shot and killed them. This incident and the guilt he felt affected his attitude to war (he became a pacifist) and his painting.

== Career ==
After serving in World War II, with the financial support of the Commonwealth Rehabilitation Training Scheme, Pugh returned to Melbourne and enrolled in the National Gallery of Victoria Art School.

Pugh was heavily influenced by German Expressionism. He read Sheldon Cheney's The Story of Modern Art (1941) while recuperating in hospital in New Guinea during World War II. Pugh's primary influence was Wassily Kandinsky: "I can see Kandinsky in everything I do." His training at the National Gallery School gave him a strong foundation in drawing and he learned the tonal painting technique, but when he took his teacher William (Bill) Dargie to see Sidney Nolan's Kelly and Dargie's attitude was dismissive, Pugh left the school to develop his own ideas.

In 1951 Pugh bought 15 acres (61,000 m^{2}) of bushland near Cottles Bridge, 50 kilometres (31 mi) northeast of Melbourne, which he named Dunmoochin. Pugh at first camped on the site, then built a wattle-and-daub shack.

Artists, potters and others also settled at the site. In order to protect and jointly control the area they formed the Dunmoochin Artists Co-operative with a constitution of 13 articles. It was not a commune in any sense of the word except that the titles were communally held. When the co-operative eventually disbanded each member took a section of the land. Artists who worked or resided at Dunmoochin have included Rick Amor, Frank Hodgkinson, John Howley, Helen Laycock, Peter Laycock, Mirka Mora, Kevin Nolan, John Olsen, John Perceval, Alma Shanahan, Albert Tucker, Frank Werther, Fred Williams and Peter and Chris Wiseman.

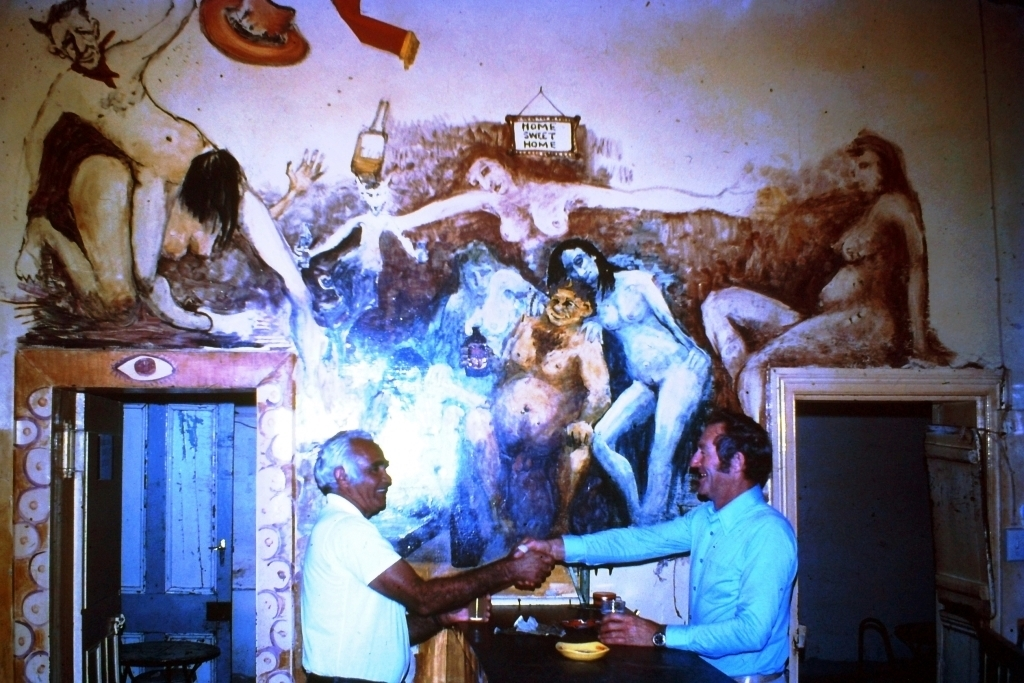
Clifton Pugh mural in the bar of the Family Hotel, Tibooburra. The borrowed effects are found in the works of Norman Lindsay and the outstretched arms of the central figure is a recurring motif in Arthur Boyd's paintings. 1976

Pugh travelled across the Nullarbor Plain to Perth in 1954 then the Kimberley in 1956. These journeys led to radical changes in his style. Pugh encountered indigenous Australian art for the first time and began utilizing incision, cross-hatching and collage. The work inspired by these journeys was part of the Group of Four Exhibits in 1955 and 1956.

In 1959 Pugh wrote to Bernard Smith:

Art must be indigenous...arising out of the environment and background of a particular place and time. This could be nationalistic but I prefer to call it geographical art. For instance, Chinese and Mexican art reflect the background and the 'soul' of the country but are also universal... I therefore believe very much in the development of an Australian art – it is the only truth for us to express to the rest of the world.

Close observation of nature and its cyclical and savage rhythms became a constant theme in Pugh's painting.

Pugh held his first solo show in 1957 at the Victorian Artists Society Gallery, where he displayed landscapes and portraits. The show was well received by critics. Col. Aubrey Gibson, chairman of the National Gallery, was an early patron, as were a group of businessmen led by David Yencken and the businessman Andrew Grimwade. Pugh joined the stable of the Sydney art dealer Rudy Komon. Komon paid his artists a stipend, balanced against sales of their work, and this generosity made them very loyal, as it gave them stability and freedom from daily money worries.

Pugh had consistent official support in the crucial early stages of his career. His inclusion in the 1961 Whitechapel and 1963 Tate exhibitions of Australian art gave him international exposure. In 1966 Komon arranged a one-man show for Pugh at the Artists' Guild Gallery in St Louis in the United States; The Commonwealth Institute staged a retrospective of his work in 1970. He was represented in London by Andre Kalman, who showed him in 1975, 1976, 1977 and 1979, and with the Athol Gallery on the Isle of Man.

The Historic Memorials Committee bought his 1964 portrait of the Governor-General Lord De L'Isle and his 1972 portrait of Gough Whitlam. In 1972, Pugh raised the profile of the previously unknown naive artist Eric L. Stewart after discovering his paintings in a junk shop while on an ALP campaign tour, and subsequently organised posthumous exhibitions for him.

Pugh's fame as an artist grew in the 1970s following the print publication of two radio plays by Ivan Smith: Death of a Wombat and Dingo King, both of which featured Pugh's drawings and paintings.

=== Printmaker ===
Pugh worked with the printmaker Stanley Hayter for three months in Paris in 1970. He brought Hayter’s oil viscosity printing technique back to Australia the same year. Pugh and John Olsen purchased an etching press and operated it at Dunmoochin. In 1971 Pugh invited Frank Hodgkinson to move to Dunmoochin and Pugh's "enthusiasm proved to be a major stimulus for Hodgkinson's printmaking."

=== Politics and art ===
Pugh chaired the Victorian ALP Arts Policy Committee from 1971, and Gough Whitlam appointed Pugh to the Australia Council for the Arts in 1973. Pugh made public his disagreements with Council chairman H C "Nugget" Coombes who refused to implement the policy Pugh and his fellow committee members had crafted and then taken through the processes of the Victorian and Federal ALP conferences to become official ALP arts policy. Pugh resigned from the Council in 1974. In 1981 as Whitlam launched Pugh's biography at Realities Gallery, he joked about having to make his speech in front of his nemesis Sir John Kerr in a controversial portrait painted by Pugh in 1975; "I'll have you know I had nothing to do with the placing of the exhibit."

=== Protanope colour vision deficiency ===
Pugh's brother and grandnephew had protanope colour vision deficiency and it is probable that he did on biographical, gene pedigree inheritance and other grounds (such as failing the colour vision test when endeavouring to enlist in the Navy).

== Personal life ==
Portrait of a Woman (Marlene Pugh) 1956, oil on hardboard

Pugh married three times: to June Byford, Marlene Harvey and Judith Ley. Pugh had two sons with Marlene, Shane and Dailan.

Pugh became a pacifist during World War II, while on active service, and retained this position during the Vietnam War. He joined the Labor Party to campaign for the end of Australia's involvement in that War. The marriage to Marlene ended in 1969, they divorced in 1971. In 1970 Pugh met Judith. He became very well known, as he and Judith used his status as a painter to improve that of the ALP. They did this in order to ensure the election of the ALP as Pugh was an anti war activist. They separated in 1980 and divorced in 1981. He lived for some years with Adriane Strampp, who trained as a painter.

=== Death and legacy ===
Pugh returned to painting full-time after his experience with the Australia Council, and despite suffering three heart attacks and minor ischaemic episodes, continued to paint and make prints until his fatal heart attack in 1990. Pugh established the Dunmoochin Foundation which now forms part of his legacy, and provides residences for artists in his bush property.

Pugh also donated Dunmoochin land to the Victorian Conservation Trust (now Trust for Nature) in 1989. Two plants of national significance have been recorded on this land.

== Archibald Prize winning works ==
- 1965 – R A Henderson
- 1971 – Sir John McEwen
- 1972 – The Hon E.G. Whitlam

== Documentary films featuring Clifton Pugh ==
- Painting People (Commonwealth Film Unit, directed by Tim Burstall)
- Bird and Animal (Eltham Films)
- Four Painters (ATV Channel 0, Melbourne)
- See It My Way (ABC Channel 2, Sydney)
- The Diamantina (De Montignie Media Productions)
- A Fragile Country
- Australian Story: Children of the Brush Part 1 (ABC Channel 2, Sydney )

Awards
Preceded by Not awarded (J. Carrington Smith, 1963)	Archibald Prize; 1965 for R. A. Henderson	Succeeded by Jon Molvig
Preceded by Eric Smith	Archibald Prize; 1971 for Sir John McEwan; 1972 for The Hon. E. G. Whitlam	Succeeded by Janet Dawson
