= Camberwell High School =

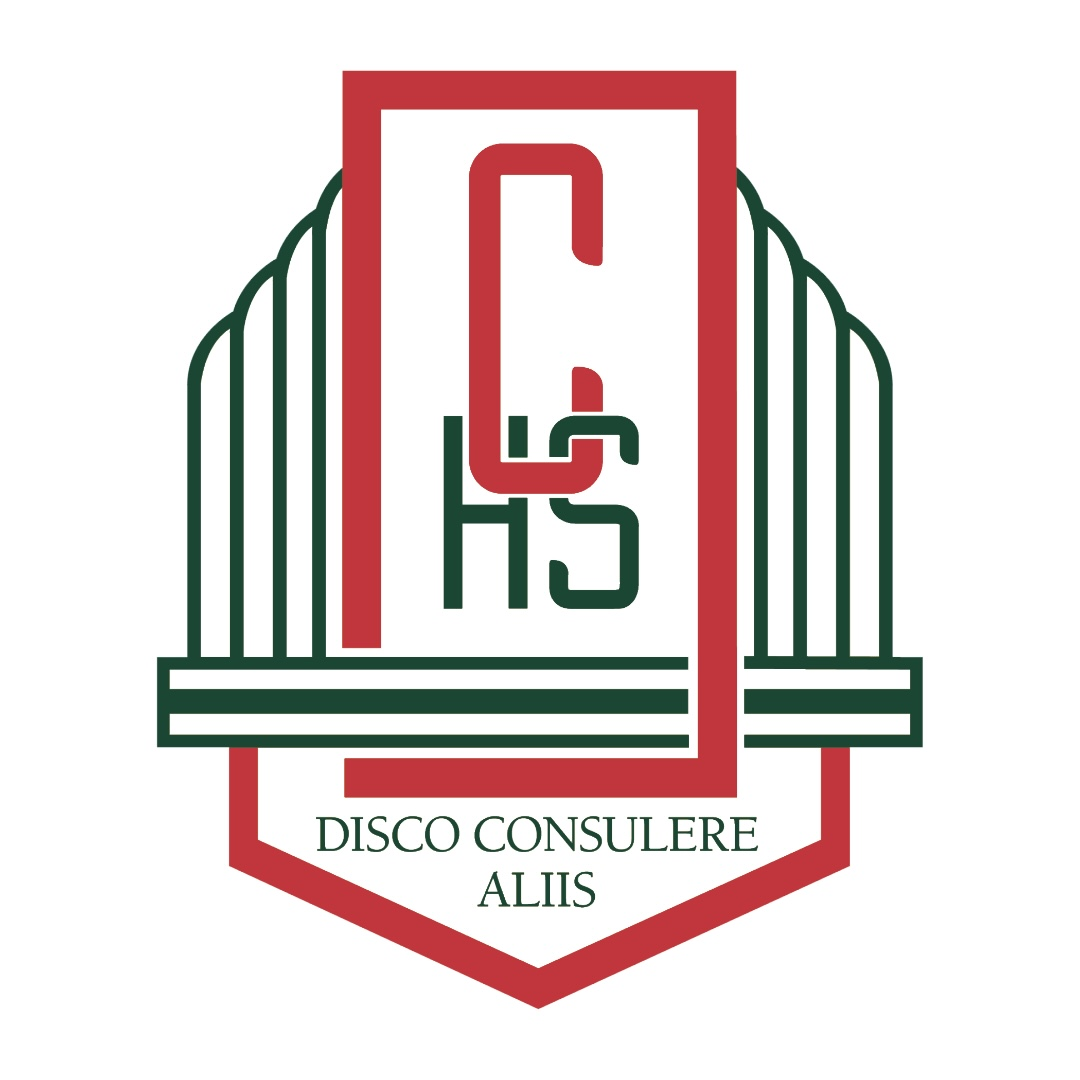

Location
- Canterbury, Victoria; Australia; 37°49′50″S 145°04′24″E

Information
- Type: Public
- Motto: Latin: Disco Consulere Aliis (Learning to be considerate of others)
- Established: 1941
- Principal: Ellie McDougall
- Years: 7–12
- Gender: Co-education
- Enrollment: Approx. 1000
- Colours: Green and red
- Yearbook: Prospice
- Publications: Bi-weekly newsletter
- Website: www.camhigh.vic.edu.au

Camberwell High School is a government-funded, government run, co-educational high school for years 7 to 12, located on Prospect Hill Road in Canterbury, a suburb of Melbourne, Victoria, Australia.

Camberwell High School is located on a 3.2-hectare site in Canterbury, which lies about twelve kilometres from Melbourne's Central Business District.

Its school zone includes the affluent suburbs of Ashburton, Camberwell, Canterbury, Surrey Hills, Hartwell, Burwood, Hawthorn and Hawthorn East.

The school is next to Riversdale Park and the East Camberwell Tennis Club. It is accessible via the 70 tram on Riversdale Road, Riversdale railway station on the Alamein line, and several bus stations of the bus route 612 on Prospect Hill Road

The school has multi-storeyed cream brick buildings, and extensive facilities. The school opened in 1941, with over 350 students – as of 2024, Camberwell High School has a total enrolment of 953, with a gender ratio of 69% male to 31% female.

== Facilities ==
The school is made up of several buildings. The double-storey A building is the centre of school administration, containing the administration office, the principal's and vice-principal's offices, the staff room, and the Brereton Library, as well as several classrooms. This is the oldest building in the school, with the façade constructed in the 1940s.

Adjacent to the A building is the assembly hall, which was renovated in 2015. This hall contains a stage with backstage areas that are connected to an underground toilet and change-room block. The hall also has theatrical lighting facilities which are accessible from the ceiling. In 2017 a student suffered a neck injury after he fell 10 m (32 ft 9.70 in) while adjusting lighting fixtures in this ceiling area.

The B Building is the centre of arts and technology, containing media and photography spaces, art rooms, and woodworking spaces. Below the B building is the music centre, containing practice rooms and a soundproofed recording studio. In the same building is the VCE centre.

The C building is parallel to the A building, and is three storeys high. The D building is adjacent to the C building, and contains the school's drama centre. Renovation on these two buildings was funded by the Victorian state government and began in 2018.

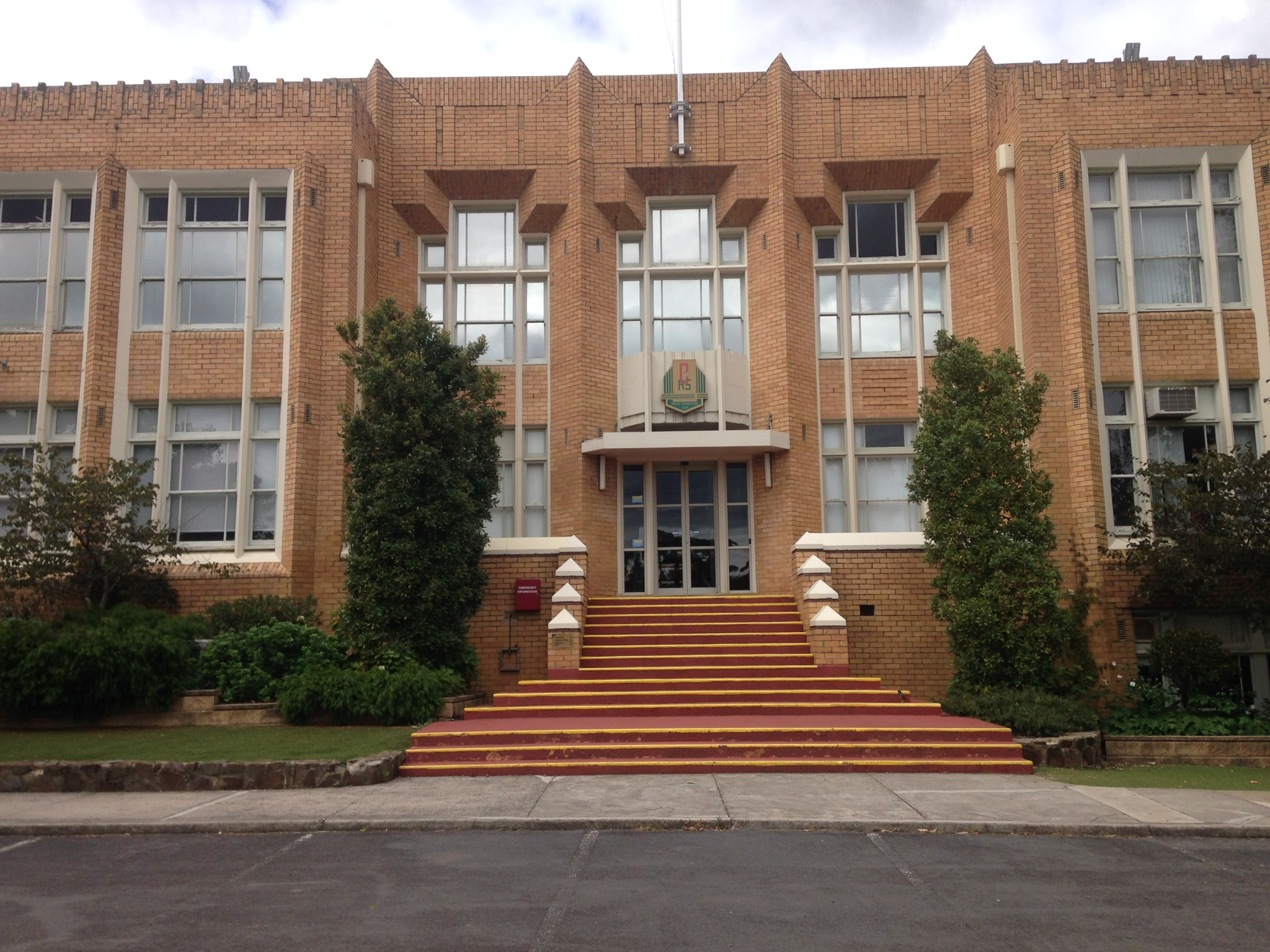
Main entrance Camberwell High School

In 2011 the school commenced construction of a new building, the E building, housing a theatrette and extensive media and IT facilities. This building has an "open learning" floor plan with only two classrooms in the building having separate doors. The centre was completed in late 2012 and was renamed from the "Innovation centre" to the "Enterprise centre". The school also has a sports hall, a large oval, and several basketball courts. In 2018, the oval's surface was changed from authentic grass to synthetic grass.

== Notable alumni ==
- David Bridie, musician
- Marie Collier, opera singer
- Jim Conway, musician
- Mic Conway, musician
- Hazel Edwards, author
- Elliot Goblet, comedian
- Lindsay Kline, cricketer
- Peter Knights, Australian rules footballer
- Tommy Little, comedian
- Tilly Lucas-Rodd, Australian rules footballer
- Robert Manne, lecturer of politics
- Dannii Minogue, singer, actress, TV personality, The X Factor UK and Australia's Got Talent judge
- Kylie Minogue, pop singer, songwriter, actress and The Voice coach
- Brian Naylor, Channel 9 news presenter
- Hudson O'Keeffe, Australian rules footballer
- Dennis Sindrey, ska musician
- Will Sparks, musician
- Robert Stone, basketball player

== House system ==
Similar to most Australian schools, Camberwell High School has its own house system. The names of the houses are named for World War II Generals, army officers, and Political Leaders: reflecting the time at school was built.

Houses
Name	Colour	Mascot
Churchill	Yellow	Tiger
Montgomery	Red	Phoenix
Macarthur	Green	Crocodile
Roosevelt	Blue	Dolphin

== Camberwell High Ex-Students Society ==
Camberwell High has an integral ex-students society also known as "C.H.E.S.S", a collective of ex-students who support the current students through mentorship, awards and financial support. The ex-students society hosts several events throughout the year to connect current and ex-students along with teachers and principals current and previous.

== Films and television ==
Knowing, a 2009 movie featuring Nicolas Cage, was filmed at Camberwell High School which was converted into the set for William Dawes Elementary, Lexington, Massachusetts circa 1959.

Former principal Elida Brereton has appeared in the Australian television comedy series Summer Heights High playing the beleaguered principal Mrs Murray.

The Australian television series The Worst Year Of My Life - Again! was filmed at Camberwell High School in 2013.

In early 2016, the Australian film Emo the Musical was filmed at Camberwell High School.

The Australian TV series The Sullivans used several locations in the local area for external shots of the residences, shops, parks and schools of the main characters, which included the grounds of Camberwell High School.

The Australian TV series Prank Patrol used the school grounds to film the episode "Internet Crash".
