= Junk shop =

Shop selling cheap second-hand goods

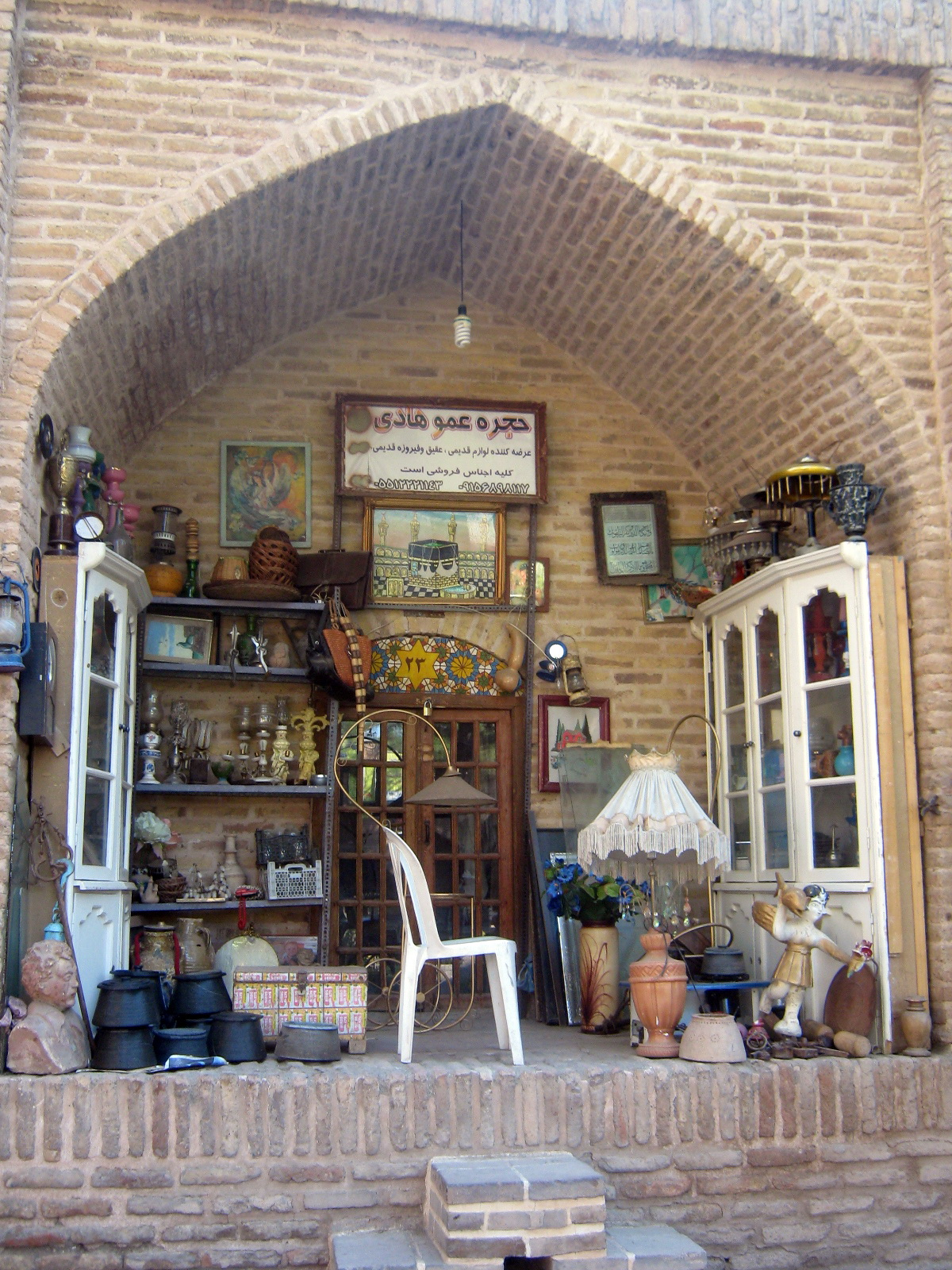
A junk shop in Caravanserai of Nishapur, Iran.

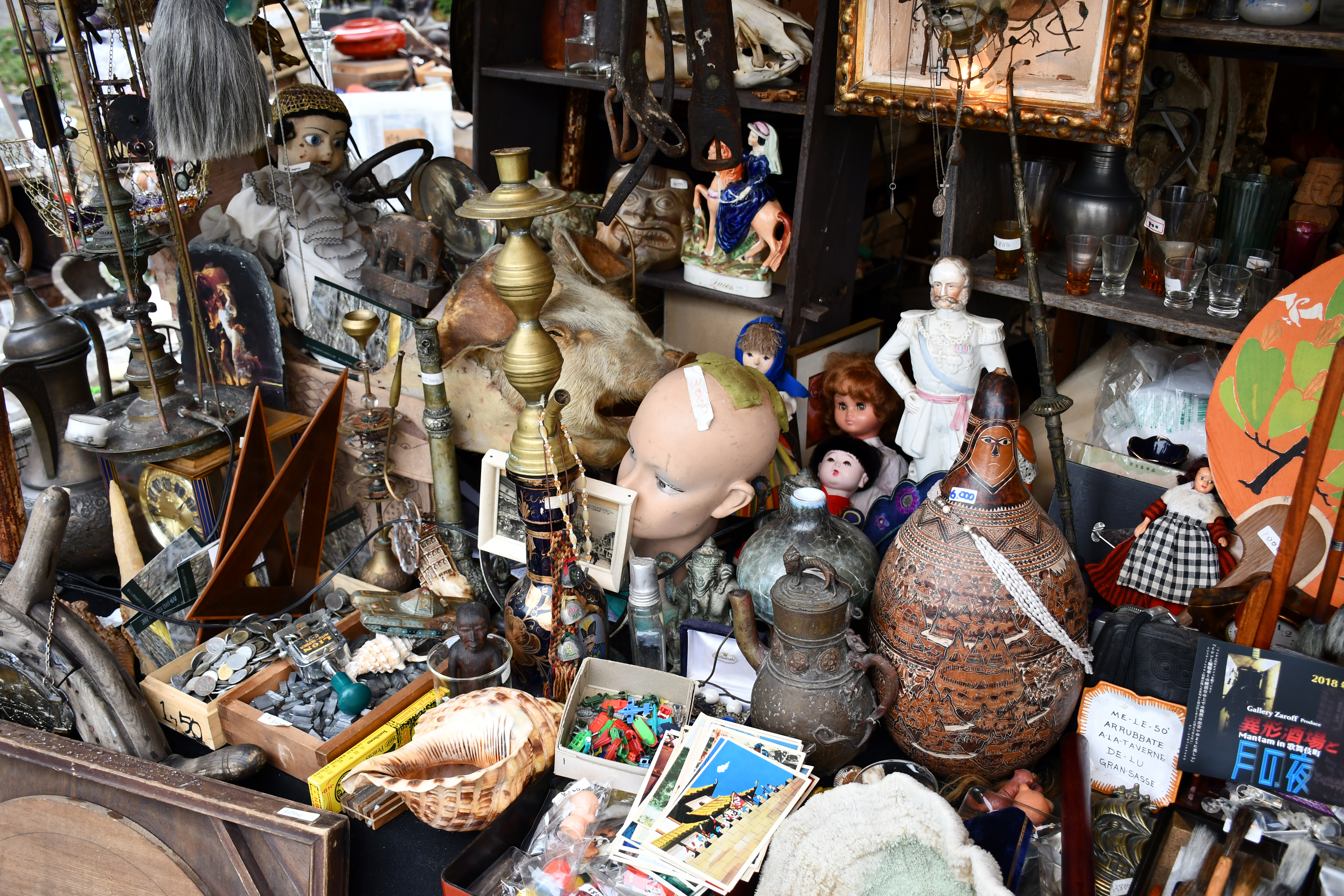
A junk shop of Ueno Park, in Tokyo (Japan).

A junk shop is a retail outlet similar to a thrift store which sells mostly used goods at cheap prices. A low-quality antique shop may border on being a junk shop. Shoppers who frequent junk shops are often referred to as "junkers", "pickers", "bargain hunters", "rummagers", etc.

== Pop culture ==
=== Reality television ===
Junk shops are often showcased in such reality television shows as American Pickers, Canadian Pickers (known as Cash Cowboys outside of Canada), and Ghost Town Gold.

=== Junkshop glam ===
Junkshop glam (less commonly referred to as junk shop glam) is a nuanced music genre term coined in the early 2000s by former Buzzcocks bassist Tony Barber and Lush bassist Phil King. Junkshop glam describes the nearly forgotten vinyl records of 1970s glam rock bands whose unsuccessful records had limited release, virtually no airplay, and have thus been relegated to the cheap record bins and often overlooked record stacks found in junk shops, charity shops, thrift stores and the like. With the resurging interest in vinyl records, such obscure glam rock records can command high prices among avid record collectors and even band members themselves looking to fill missing releases in their own discographies.

== See also ==
- Bric-a-brac
- Car boot sale
- Charity shop
- Flea market
- Thrift store
