= Robert Stone (trail guide writer) =

American author, photographer, and publisher

Robert Paul Stone
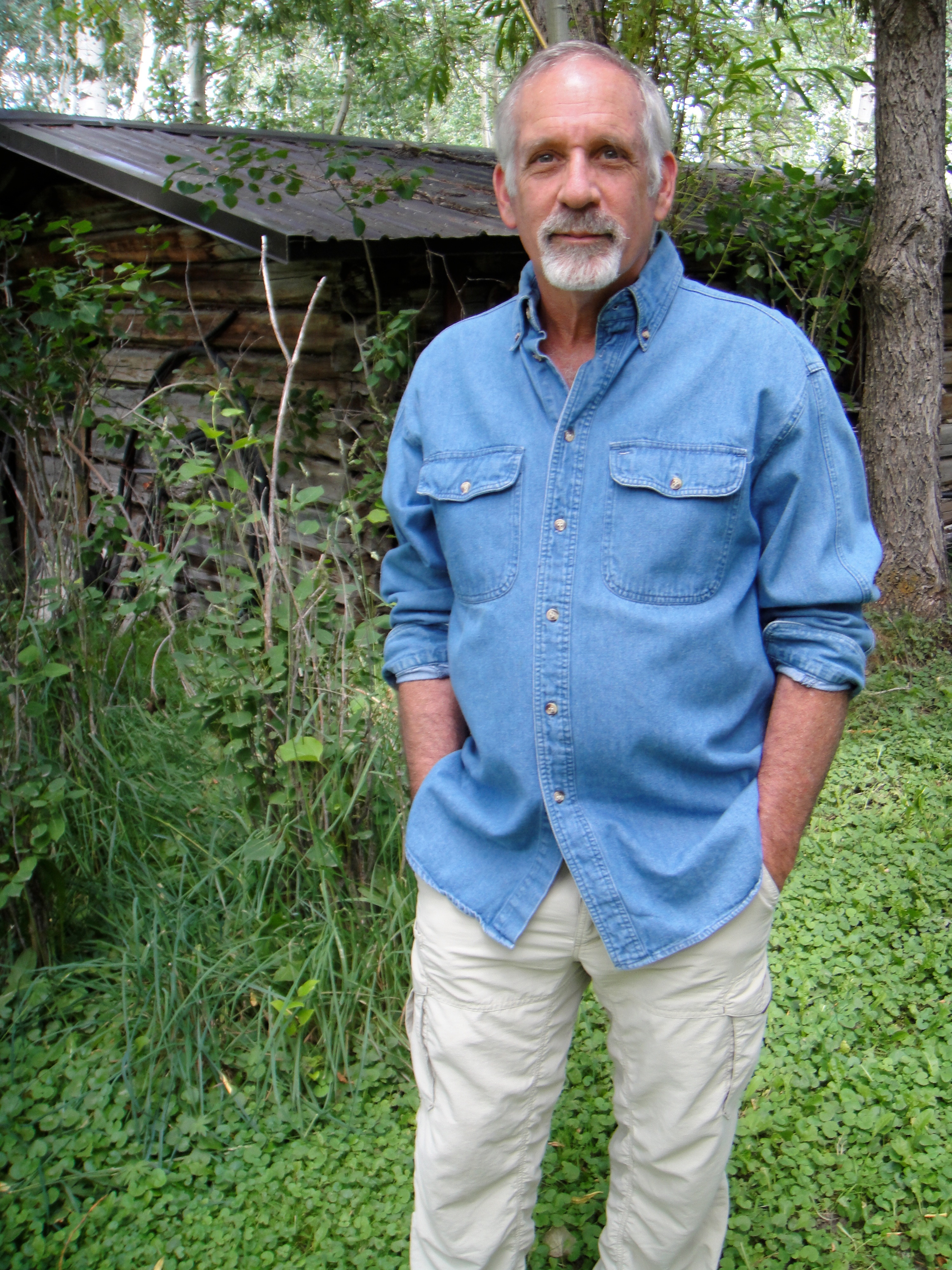
- Stone on his Montana property in 2014
- Born: March 10, 1951 (age 74); Los Angeles, California
- Occupation(s): Author, Photographer, Publisher
- Years active: 1991 - Present
- Known for: Day Hike Books Series
- Website: http://dayhikebooks.com/

Robert Paul Stone (born March 10, 1951) is the author, photographer, and publisher of the trail guide series Day Hike Books. Since 1991, Stone has hiked every trail in the Day Hike Book series, covering thousands of miles of trails throughout the western United States and Hawaii. He has self-published more than 30 hiking guides in the series, many of them in their third, fourth, fifth, or sixth editions. Stone summers in the Rocky Mountains of Montana and winters on the California Central Coast.

== Career ==
Stone was born in Los Angeles in 1951. In 1981, he relocated to Red Lodge, Montana, where he started his own real estate business. In 1991, he began to write, publish, market, and distribute local trail guide booklets for Red Lodge and Yellowstone National Park. The pamphlets were so successful that in 1992, he struck a distribution deal for future books with ICS Books, a major publishing house. Subsequently, Stone left the real estate industry and devoted himself full-time to researching, writing, and publishing substantial trail guides. In 1997, ICS was bought out by Globe Pequot Press, who continued to distribute his books. Presently, he self-publishes and is distributed through National Book Network. Stone has written, revised, and published 31 guides for trails in Montana, Wyoming, Colorado, Arizona, California, and Hawaii, 20 of them currently in print and as eBooks. Stone frequently updates his books, seeking new trails and improvements of previous editions.

== Writing style ==
Stone writes for everyone, from the novice to the veteran hiker, with day hikes ranging from half a mile to 12 miles in length. Trail guides for each hike include an informational summary, detailed instructions of location and directions to the trailhead, a concise description of each hike, distance of the trail, approximate length in time of the hike, elevation gain, exposure, level of difficulty, whether dogs are allowed, reference to pertinent USGS maps, and specific interlinking maps. Each book contains a well-organized Table of Contents and a comprehensive Index. Stone's writing style is simple and direct. His descriptions are clear and precise, so as not to confuse the reader. He aims to get hikers on the trail and keep them from getting lost.

== Recognition ==
Stone is a Los Angeles Times Best Selling Author. Various professional outdoor writers groups have repeatedly honored him with organizational awards: He is an author of the Bay Area Travel Writers (BATW), an award-winning author of the Northwest Outdoor Writers Association (NOWA), an active member of the Outdoor Writers Association of America (OWAA), an author of the Outdoor Writers Association of California (OWAC), and an author of the Rocky Mountain Outdoor Writers and Photographers (RMOWP).

== Works ==
- Day Hikes In Denver, Colorado, 1st Edition, 1995, ISBN 0-9640232-4-5
- Day Hikes In Aspen, Colorado, 1st Edition, 1996, ISBN 1-57342-003-4
- Day Hikes On St. Martín, 1st Edition, 1996, ISBN 1-57342-005-0
- Day Hikes In Boulder, Colorado, 2nd Edition, 1997, ISBN 1-57342-007-7
- Day Hikes In Steamboat Springs, Colorado, 2nd Edition, 1997, ISBN 1-57342-008-5
- Day Hikes In Summit County, Colorado, 2nd Edition, 1997, ISBN 1-57342-009-3
- Day Hikes Around Lake Tahoe, 1st Edition, 1997, ISBN 1-57342-014-X
- Day Hikes In Sequoia And Kings Canyon National Parks, 1st Edition, 2001, ISBN 978-1-57342-030-3
- Day Hikes On Oahu, 3rd Edition, 2001, ISBN 978-1-57342-038-9
- Day Hikes On Maui, 3rd Edition, 2001, ISBN 978-1-57342-039-6
- Day Hikes On Kauai, 3rd Edition, 2001, ISBN 978-1-57342-040-2
- Day Hikes On The California Southern Coast, 1st Edition, 2004, ISBN 978-1-57342-045-7
- Day Hikes Around Yellowstone National Park, 4th Edition, 2005, ISBN 978-1-57342-048-8
- Day Hikes Around Sedona, 2nd Edition, 2006, ISBN 978-1-57342-049-5
- Day Hikes In Hawaii: Kauai, Maui, & Oahu, 1st Edition, 2006, ISBN 978-1-57342-050-1
- Day Hikes Around Napa Valley, 1st Edition, 2008, ISBN 978-1-57342-057-0
- Day Hikes On The California Central Coast, 1st Edition, 2009, ISBN 978-1-57342-058-7
- Day Hikes In Yosemite National Park, 3rd Edition, 2009, ISBN 978-1-57342-059-4
- Day Hikes Around Bozeman, Montana, 4th Edition, 2011, ISBN 978-1-57342-063-1
- Day Hikes In The Beartooth Mountains, 5th Edition, 2012, ISBN 978-1-57342-064-8
- Day Hikes In The Santa Monica Mountains, 1st Edition, 2012, ISBN 978-1-57342-065-5
- Day Hikes Around Missoula, Montana, 4th Edition, 2013, ISBN 978-1-57342-066-2
- Day Hikes Around Monterey And Carmel, 2nd Edition, 2013, ISBN 978-1-57342-067-9
- Day Hikes Around Big Sur, 2nd Edition, 2014, ISBN 978-1-57342-068-6
- Day Hikes In Grand Teton National Park, 5th Edition, 2014, ISBN 978-1-57342-069-3
- Day Hikes Around San Luis Obispo, 3rd Edition, 2015, ISBN 978-1-57342-070-9
- Day Hikes Around Los Angeles, 6th Edition, 2015, ISBN 978-1-57342-071-6
- Day Hikes Around Sonoma County, 2nd Edition, 2016, ISBN 978-1-57342-072-3
- Day Hikes Around Orange County, 2nd Edition, 2017, ISBN 978-1-57342-074-7
- Day Hikes Around Santa Barbara, 4th Edition, 2018, ISBN 978-1-57342-075-4
- Day Hikes Around Ventura County, 4th Edition, 2019, ISBN 978-1-57342-076-1

== Awards ==
Year	Book	Organization	Rank
2005	Day Hikes Around Yellowstone National Park	RMOWP	Second
2005	Day Hikes On The California Southern Coast	RMOWP	Second
2005	Day Hikes Around Orange County	RMOWP	Second
2006	Day Hikes In The Beartooth Mountains	RMOWP	Third
2006	Day Hikes Around San Luis Obispo	OWAC	Second
2006	Day Hikes Around Sedona	OWAC	Third
2006	Day Hikes In Hawaii: Kauai, Maui, & Oahu	OWAC	Third
2007	Day Hikes Around Bozeman, Montana	NOWA	First
2007	Day Hikes Around Bozeman, Montana	RMOWP	Fourth
2007	Day Hikes Around Sonoma County	NOWA	First
2007	Day Hikes Around Sonoma County	OWAC	Conference
2007	Day Hikes Around Sonoma County	RMOWP	Fourth
2007	Day Hikes In Hawaii: Kauai, Maui, & Oahu	RMOWP	Third
2008	Day Hikes Around Missoula, Montana	RMOWP	Second
2008	Day Hikes Around Napa Valley	RMOWP	First
2008	Day Hikes Around Napa Valley	BATW	Third
2009	Day Hikes In Yosemite National Park	OWAC	First
2009	Day Hikes In Yosemite National Park	RMOWP	Fourth
2009	Day Hikes On The California Central Coast	NOWA	Third
2009	Day Hikes On The California Central Coast	OWAC	Second
2009	Day Hikes On The California Central Coast	RMOWP	Third
2010	Day Hikes Around Santa Barbara	OWAC	Second
2010	Day Hikes Around Santa Barbara	RMOWP	Second
2010	Day Hikes Around Los Angeles	NOWA	Third
2010	Day Hikes Around Los Angeles	OWAC	First
2010	Day Hikes Around Los Angeles	RMOWP	First
2010	Day Hikes Around Los Angeles	RMOWP	Best Of Show
2011	Day Hikes Around Ventura County	OWAC	Second
2011	Day Hikes Around Ventura County	RMOWP	Third
2012	Day Hikes In The Santa Monica Mountains	RMOWP	Second
2013	Day Hikes Around Monterey And Carmel	RMOWP	Second
2014	Day Hikes Around Big Sur	OWAC	First
2015	Day Hikes Around Big Sur	RMOWP	Second
2015	Day Hikes In Grand Teton National Park	RMOWP	Third
2016	Day Hikes Around San Luis Obispo	NOWA	Second
2016	Day Hikes Around San Luis Obispo	RMOWP	Third
2017	Day Hikes Around Los Angeles	BATW	Third
2018	Day Hikes Around Orange County	OWAC	First
2019	Day Hikes Around Santa Barbara	NOWA	Third

== Sources ==
- Barlow, Zeke - Ventura County Star "A New Guide to the Great Outdoors is Published" Mar. 6, 2011 http://www.vcstar.com/news/2011/mar/06/a-new-guide-to-the-great-outdoors-is-published/
- Bay Area Travel Writers (BATW) http://www.batw.org/category/contests/batw-anthology/
- Becher, Bill - LA Daily News "His Happy Trails: Ex Real Estate Agent Leaves No Stone Unturned" Nov. 7, 2002 http://www.thefreelibrary.com/HIS+HAPPY+TRAILS+EXREAL+ESTATE+AGENT+LEAVES+NO+STONE+UNTURNED+IN%C2%85-a095491210
- California Birth Index, 1905–1995," index, FamilySearch (https://familysearch.org/ark:/61903/1:1:VG7R-NH2 : accessed 12 May 2015), Robert Paul Stone, 10 Mar 1951; citing Los Angeles, California, United States, Department of Health Services, Vital Statistics Department, Sacramento
- Carlo, Juan - Ventura County Star “Finding A Little Solitude” Mar. 9, 2011 https://www.youtube.com/watch?v=t1fcPc3ovk0
- DeMaria, Richie - Santa Barbara Independent “A Conversation With Best-Selling Author Robert Stone” Mar. 8, 2015 http://www.independent.com/news/2015/mar/08/conversation-best-selling-author-robert-stone/
- DeNevi, Don - Palo Alto Daily News “Books Help Hikers Find Adventure” Mar. 17, 2001
- Fischer, Meade - Monterey Bay News & Views "Day Hikes Around Monterey & Carmel" Mar. 2013
- French, Brett - Billings Gazette "Day Hikes in the Beartooth Mountains" Apr. 27, 2006
- Greenberg, Peter - An Insider's Guide to Travel: News, Tips, Information & Inspiration "Radio Guest List-San Luis Obispo County, CA" Sept. 26, 2015 http://petergreenberg.com/2015/09/23/radio-guest-list-san-luis-obispo-california-september-26-2015/
- Jauck, Silke - Make It Missoula "Happy Hiking: Discover Missoula and the Bitterroot on Foot" Oct. 19, 2011 http://www.makeitmissoula.com/2011/10/happy-hiking-discover-missoula-and-the-bitterroot-on-foot/
- Los Angeles Times Bestsellers Oct. 8, 2000
- Los Angeles Times Bestsellers Nov. 5, 2000
- Neti, Ingrid - SLO County Magazine “Day Hikes In San Luis Obispo County California” Feb. 2001
- Nichols, Margot Petit - Carmel Pine Cone "You Can Do It, And ‘Day Hikes Around Monterey & Carmel’ Shows How" Aug 2, 2002
- Northwest Outdoor Writers Association (NOWA)http://www.northwest-outdoor-writers-association.org/index.php
- Outdoor Writers Association of America - Outdoors Unlimited "Bookshelf" p. 32 Apr./May 2015 http://www.owaa.org/oudocs/outdoors-unlimited-april-may-2015-1273.pdf
- Outdoor Writers Association of America (OWAA) http://owaa.org/
- Outdoor Writers Association of California - OWAC Newsletter p. 2 Apr. 2015 http://static1.1.sqspcdn.com/static/f/364347/26140086/1429062599043/ALT+owac_OWAC.pdf?token=QEE8sBEFYPbTHwVCztI0gHwSeZw%3D
- Outdoor Writers Association of California (OWAC) http://owac.org/2012-craft-awards-winners/
- Powell, Shirley - SLO County Journal “Robert Stone Wants To Put You On A Trail” Oct. 2006
- Reuss, Dave - Outside Bozeman "Day Hikes Around Bozeman" Spring 2011 http://www.outsidebozeman.com/spring-2011/hike-your-camera
- Rocky Mountain Outdoor Writers and Photographers - Rocky Mountain Outdoors "New Books From Robert Stone" p. 6 Mar./Apr. 2015 http://rmowp.org/rmowp/wp-content/uploads/2013/08/RMO_03_04_2015.pdf
- Rocky Mountain Outdoor Writers and Photographers (RMOWP) http://rmowp.org/2015/10/04/2015-writing-and-video-awards/
- Rodriguez, Suzie - Sonoma County Tourism Blog "125 Great Hikes Around Sonoma County" Apr. 18, 2016 http://www.sonomacounty.com/blog/125-great-hikes-around-sonoma-county
- Rodriguez, Suzie - Sonoma County Regional Parks Blog "Popular Hiking Guide Features Sonoma County's Newest Parks" Apr. 17, 2016 http://parks.sonomacounty.ca.gov/About_Us/Blog/Popular_Hiking_Guide_Features_Sonoma_County_s_Newest_Parks.aspx
- Sneed, David, The Tribune "Day Hikes Around San Luis Obispo Is A New Book Featuring 156 Local Hikes" May 3, 2015 http://www.sanluisobispo.com/entertainment/books/article39528411.html
- Stone, Robert - Day Hike Books http://dayhikebooks.com/day-hike-books-all/
- Warren, Christi - The Press Democrat "Trail of the Week: Forestville" Dec. 17, 2015 http://www.pressdemocrat.com/lifestyle/4817269-181/trail-of-the-week-forestville?artslide=1
- Young, Heather - Journal Plus "Local Hiking Guru And Author Robert Stone Making A Living Hiking" May 2015 http://www.issuu.com/journalplus/docs/5-15_journal_plus_web/3?e=1222365/12550054
