= Robert Stone (silversmith) =

Robert Edgar Stone (1903–1990) was an English silversmith who worked in the mid-20th century and was noted for hand-crafted commissions.

Candestick made by Robert Stone

== Early life and education ==
Stone was born in 1903 in London, son of a carpenter, Arthur Stone, and Ada, née Scantlebury. A childhood accident that nearly resulted in the loss of his arm affected his education, limiting the possible trades he could enter, and at 14 he began training in the silversmithing department of London's Central School of Arts and Crafts.

His work at the School resulted in a two-year travelling scholarship from the Worshipful Company of Goldsmiths, under which he travelled throughout western Europe and trained in Paris at La Maison Hénin. Stone established a workshop, in time took on apprentices, and in 1939 was made a liveryman of the Goldsmiths Company.

== Later career ==
Stone's workshop produced works primarily of sterling silver. It was closed for the duration of World War II, during which he worked on torpedo testing in Scotland. He resumed work in London after the war, continuing to train apprentices and produce works at his workshop at 20 Garrick Street, where by 1955 he had trained seven apprentices. He continued to work at Garrick Street until 1964. He later operated from a workshop in his home at Portincaple, on the west coast of Scotland, until 1980. Stone died in 1990.

== Major works ==
Stone's works were distinguished by being hand crafted throughout his career, during an era of increasing mass production of goods such as silverware. He was responsible for a number of major commissions, including a cross and candlesticks for the Temple Church, London; an altar cross for the Wren Chapel, Pembroke College, Cambridge, and a rosebowl made from palladium, a rarely used precious metal, prepared for the Institute of Metallurgy as a gift to Princess Margaret.

Stone featured in a book by Australian businessman and collector Aubrey H L Gibson, who in The Rosebowl describes Gibson's visit to Stone's workshop where he learns some basics of silversmithing, and the creation by Stone of a rosebowl commissioned by Gibson.

== Personal life ==
Stone married Dorothy Rae in 1929 and had two daughters, Jean (also a silversmith) and Christine (a painter). His papers are archived at the Victoria & Albert Museum Archive of Art and Design.
