= Mic Conway =

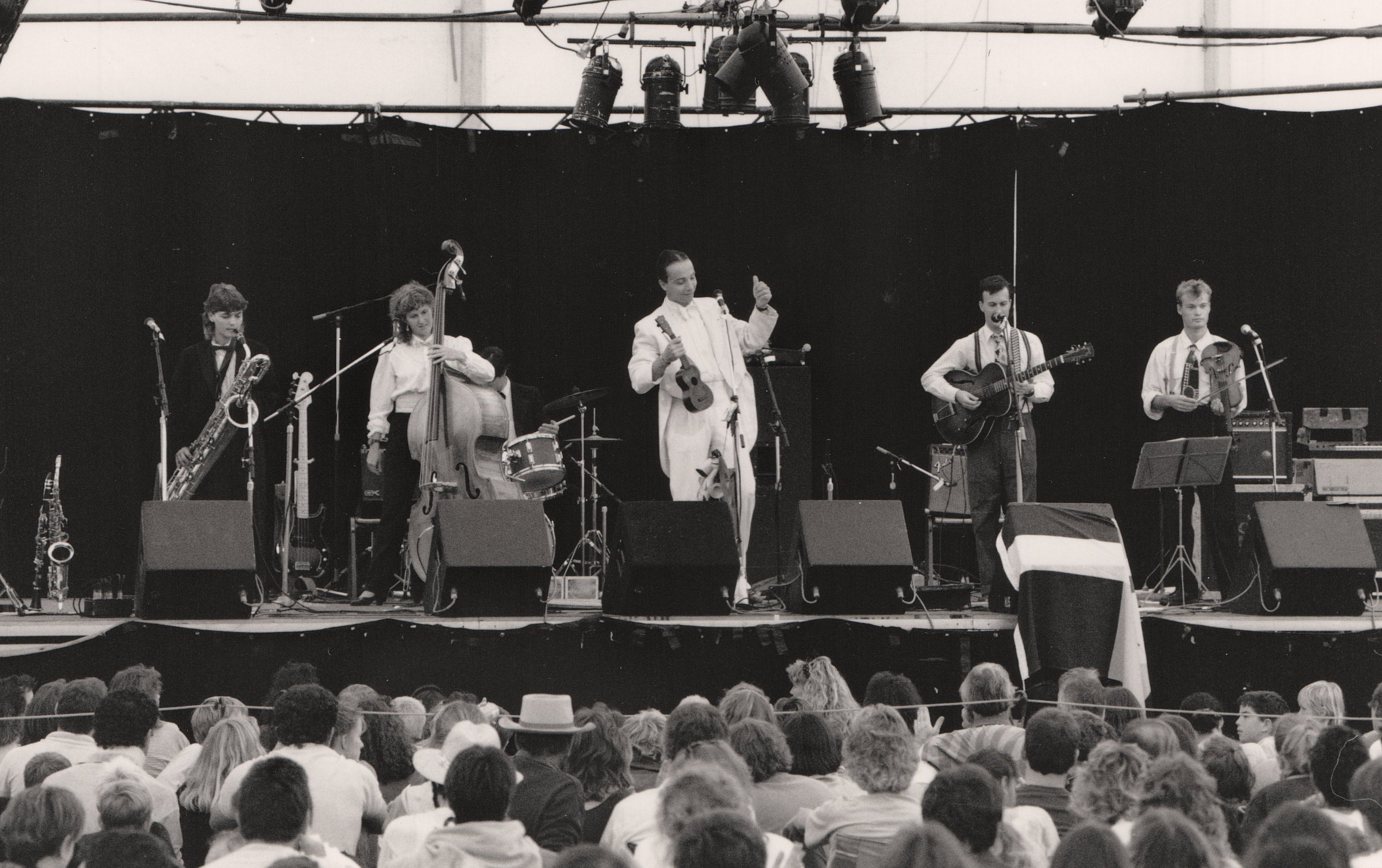
- Conway, centre, with the Conway Brothers Hiccups Orchestra, on stage at the 1989 Port Fairy Folk Festival

Background information
- Born: 15 February 1951 (age 75); Melbourne, Victoria, Australia
- Genres: Children's, jug band, ragtime, vaudeville
- Occupations: Multi-instrumentalist, vocalist, entertainer
- Instruments: Vocals, harmonica, ukulele, musical saw, tenor guitar, washboard, jug
- Years active: 1968–present
- Website: www.micconway.com

Mic Conway (born 15 February 1951) is an Australian vocalist and with his brother, Jim Conway, was a co-founder of the 1970s humour, theatre and rock group, The Captain Matchbox Whoopee Band.

Conway also was a founding member of Soapbox Circus and Circus Oz.

Conway plays an assortment of oddball instruments, and performs magic, juggling, tap dancing and fire eating.

== Biography ==
Conway, along with his brother Jim, attended Camberwell High School. There they formed the Jelly Bean Jug Band which would later become The Captain Matchbox Whoopee Band. Captain Matchbox would later find success in the 1970s where the group produced seven records, two of which reached gold status. Also in the 1970s, he joined the Pram Factory Theatre and created the Soapbox Circus with Matchbox where he served as the ringmaster, musician, juggler and acrobat. The act would become Circus Oz in 1978.

Conway was a member of the Conway Brothers Hiccups Orchestra from 1984 to 1988 and toured the UK in 1986 appearing at the Edinburgh Festival, the Capitol Music Festival and the Newcastle Festival. In 1988, the Conway Brothers appeared at the Houston International Festival, World Expo 88 and the Perth festival.

He reinvented himself as a children's performer in the 1990s, appearing on shows such as Humphrey B. Bear (on which he was known as 'Magic Mic'), Play School, Mr. Squiggle and ABC 4 Kids, and Conway received an ARIA (Australian Recording Industry Association) award in 1994. Conway was a regular part of The Wiggles where he provided the voice of Wags the Dog for the TV series in the 1990s and 2000s, co-wrote songs, and made appearances on various videos, including the group's feature movie.

He also has a band, Mic Conway's National Junk Band.

== Awards and nominations ==
=== ARIA Music Awards ===
Year	Nominated works	Award	Result	Ref
1994	Whoopee!	Best Children's Album	Won	
1997	What's That Sound?	Best Children's Album	Nominated	
