= The Hon E.G. Whitlam =

1972 painting by Clifton Pugh

- Artist: Clifton Pugh
- Year: 1972
- Medium: oil on composition board
- Dimensions: 113.5 cm × 141.5 cm (44.7 in × 55.7 in)
- Location: Parliament House, Canberra

The Hon E.G. Whitlam is a 1972 portrait painting by Australian artist Clifton Pugh. The painting depicts Gough Whitlam, 21st Prime Minister of Australia. The painting was awarded the 1972 Archibald Prize. Pugh had won the same prize the year before for a portrait of Australia's 18th Prime Minister John McEwen.

Art critic Sasha Grishin describes the painting as "outstanding for its vibrancy, expressive characterisation and energetic brushwork."

Pugh was sometimes described by contemporaries as "the court painter to the [Australian] Labor Party (ALP)." Pugh started the work before Whitlam was elected the ALP Prime Minister in 1972. He told journalist Laurie Oakes that Whitlam "keeps a cover on himself and seldom relaxes. I’m having a hard job to decide just how to paint him, to decide what sort of man he really is."

In the end, after a dozen false starts, [Pugh] decided Whitlam was strong and confident, though with an eye more on a place in history than on the present, and painted him that way

— Laurie Oakes,

After Whitlam's dismissal from office by the Governor-General, Whitlam refused to sit for an official portrait to sit in Parliament House and requested that Pugh's portrait be hung instead. This offer was accepted and the portrait remains part of the Parliament House collection.
