= Dennis Sindrey =

Dennis J. Sindrey (15 June 1935 – 25 April 2024) was an Australian-born calypso, mento, Jamaican shuffle and ska singer, songwriter and guitarist.

A prominent guitarist in the early days of recorded Jamaican music, Sindrey played on recordings by Laurel Aitken, Owen Gray and The Jiving Juniors.

== Early life ==
Sindrey was born on 15 June 1935 in Richmond, a suburb of Melbourne, Australia but grew up in Camberwell.

He attended Camberwell Central school and then Camberwell High School.

== Early career ==
Sindrey began his career playing banjo in the dixieland jazz bands of Nevill Sherburn, Frank Traynor and others. After switching to guitar in 1954, he played in various night clubs and hotels in and around Melbourne.

In 1956, Sindrey moved to Surfers Paradise, Queensland where he formed The Caribs together with Peter Stoddart (piano), Lowell Morris (drums) and Max Wildman (bandleader, saxophone). The Caribs also featured Haitian conga drummer, Albert LaGuerre.

In 1958, The Caribs (sans LaGuerre) accepted an offer brokered by Max Wildman to travel to Jamaica to become the house band at the resurrected Glass Bucket Club in Kingston. Added to The Caribs lineup was bass player Lloyd Brevett (later of The Skatalites). Whilst playing at The Glass Bucket Club and (later) the Myrtle Bank Hotel, The Caribs met many important figures of the then nascent Jamaican music industry.

== Recordings ==
1959, The Caribs became the first studio band for Island Records (and its offshoot, R&B), then jointly owned by Chris Blackwell, Graeme Goodall and Ken Khoury. In that capacity, Sindrey played guitar on hit recordings for Laurel Aitken, Owen Gray, Wilfred Edwards and Keith and Enid amongst others. The Caribs also had their own release on Island, "Taboo". Most of these recordings were made after hours at the studios of radio station RJR engineered by Graeme Goodall.

Also in 1959, Ken Khoury employed The Caribs to be the studio band at his new studio, Federal Records (now known as Tuff Gong). Sindrey also appeared on early Coxsone Dodd productions both uncredited and as a member of the aggregations The City Slickers and The Coxsonairs Orchestra together with Roland Alphonso, Rico Rodriguez and Don Drummond. Dennis Sindrey also had credited releases by Coxsone Dodd including "Hoppin' Guitar" and "Jamaican Song". Sindrey played guitar on Jamaican shuffle and ska recordings for Prince Buster, Leslie Kong and other independent record producers.

In the early 1960s, Sindrey arranged, played and recorded with Byron Lee & The Dragonaires and Kes Chin & The Souvenirs, two of the leading uptown dance bands on the island.

After Lowell Morris returned to Australia in 1962, Sindrey and Stoddart formed a new lineup of The Caribs to be the house band at the Junkanoo Lounge of the Sheraton Hotel Kingston. The Caribs remained at the Junkanoo Lounge into the early 1970s with Sindrey on guitar until he left Jamaica in 1968.

Sindrey also had 3 LPs of calypsos released in his own name in Jamaica. His single release "Take Ya Meat Out Me Rice" was a local hit.

Whilst in Jamaica, Sindrey also ran a "jingle shop business", making TV and radio commercials for Caribbean and international advertising agencies.

== Later life and death ==
Sindrey married Cherry Wong, a Jamaican of Chinese extraction, in 1965. The Sindreys had a son and a daughter, both born in Jamaica.

Sindrey emigrated to the United States in 1968, where he worked as a solo musician using computerised backgrounds in country clubs around South Florida and on charter yachts.

In 2002, Sindrey was invited to play guitar in the backing band at the two-night "The Legends of Ska" at the Palaise Royale Ballroom in Toronto, Canada from which the documentary film, The Legends of Ska was produced.

Sindrey returned to Melbourne in 2008 for a reunion of The Caribs at The Corner Hotel.

Sindrey later resided in Boca Raton, Florida. He died on in Florida on 25 April 2024, at the age of 88.

== Honours ==
In 2012, Sindrey, Stoddart, Morris and Goodall were honoured for their contribution to pre-reggae Jamaican music at the annual Tribute To The Greats event in Kingston, Jamaica.
