= Robert Stone (basketball) =

Australian basketball player

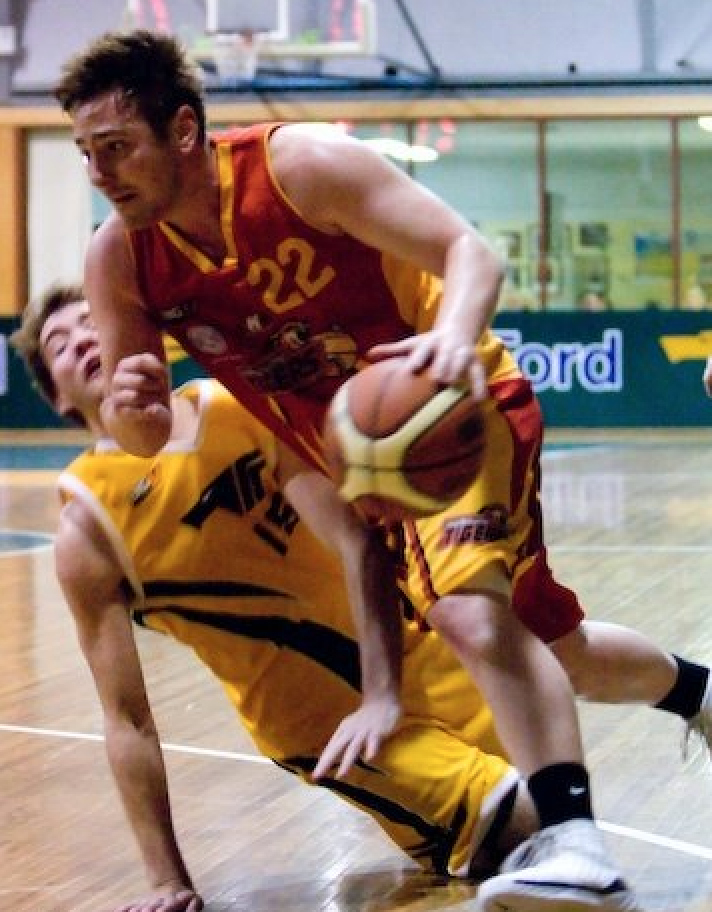

Personal information
- Born: 9 September 1987 (age 38) Melbourne, Victoria, Australia
- Listed height: 6 ft 2 in (1.88 m)

Career information
- High school: Camberwell (Camberwell, Australia)
- College: Lassen College (2006–2007)
- Playing career: 2008–2011
- Position: Shooting guard

Career history
- 2008–2011: Melbourne Tigers

Robert Stone also known as Robbie Stone (born 9 September 1987) is an Australian former professional basketball player who played for the Melbourne Tigers in the National Basketball League (NBL).

== High school and college ==
Robert Stone lead Camberwell High School to its first-ever Schools Sports Victoria (SSV) State title in 2001 averaging 20.4 points per game. Upon graduating from Camberwell High School in 2005, Stone attended California's Lassen College in 2006–07 where he started as a freshman in 16 games averaging 9.9 points & 3.1 assists per game.

== Basketball career ==
=== Melbourne Tigers ===
Stone is the only person apart from Adrian Sturt to have played for the Melbourne Tigers in Junior, VBL, ABA & NBL programs. Stone made his professional debut against the Adelaide 36ers on 28 December 2008.

Following the 2008/2009 NBL season Stone was a key member of the 2009 Big V State Championship side that showcased players such as Daryl Corletto, Matt O'Hea, Tommy Greer, Daniel Johnson, Adrian Strut & Boden Westover.

Stone played for the Melbourne Tigers in the NBL from 2008-2011 & played 103 game in the Championship division in Big V.

== Later career ==
Following his final professional basketball season in 2011, Stone began a career in human resources as Chief People Officer of Wunderman Thompson.
