= Jim Conway (musician) =

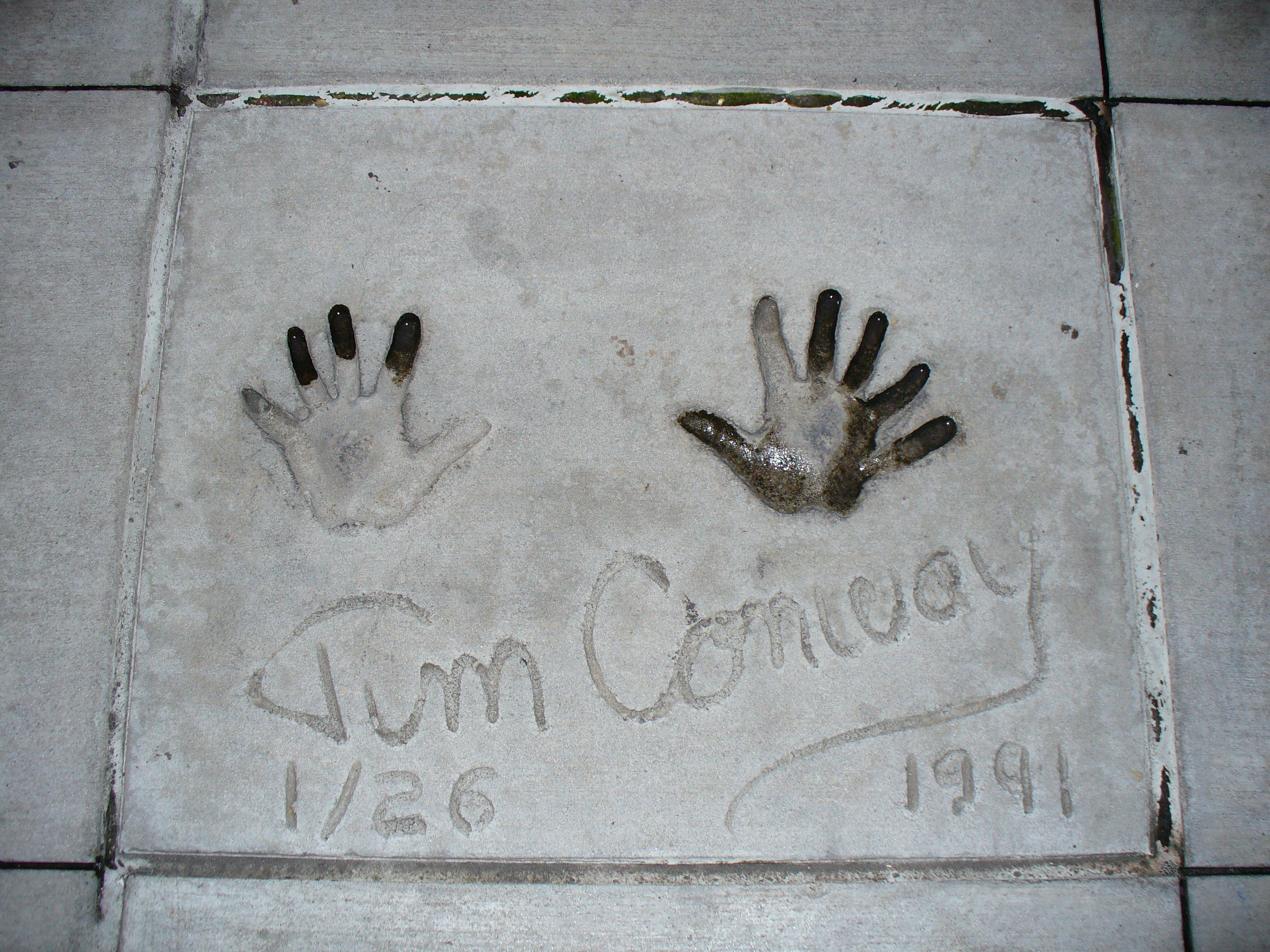
- The handprints of Jim Conway in front of Hollywood Hills Amphitheater at Walt Disney World's Disney's Hollywood Studios theme park.

Background information
- Born: Melbourne, Victoria, Australia
- Genres: Blues, jazz, country
- Instrument: Harmonica
- Years active: 1971–2014

James Conway is an Australian harmonica player and with his brother, Mic Conway, was a co-founder of the 1970s humour, theatre and rock group, The Captain Matchbox Whoopee Band.

Conway plays blues, jazz and country music, and has undertaken national tours with American bluesman Brownie McGhee, The Captain Matchbox Whoopee Band, Circus Oz and Backsliders and more recently Jim Conway's Big Wheel.

== Biography ==
During his high school years, Conway, along with his brother Mic, attended Camberwell High School

Conway was a member of the Conway Brothers Hiccups Orchestra from 1984 to 1988 and toured the UK in 1986 appearing at the Edinburgh Festival, the Capitol Music Festival and the Newcastle Festival. In 1988, the Conway Brothers appeared at the Houston International Festival, World Expo 88 and the Perth festival. Conway joined the Backsliders in 1989, touring nationally at festivals including the Perth, Adelaide, Sydney, Brisbane and Melbourne Festivals, Womad, the East Coast Blues Festival, the Port Fairy Folk Festival, the Wangaratta Jazz Festival, the Bellingen Jazz Festival and the Gold Coast International Jazz and Blues Festival. He has twice been a judge at the Hohner Australian Harmonica Championships at the Tamworth Country Music Festival.

Apart from four successful recordings, including two gold records with Captain Matchbox, Conway co-produced two of the Backsliders eight albums; "Sitting on a Million" and "Hellhound". In 2003 he was awarded the prestigious Centenary Medal in recognition of his contribution to the Arts.

In 2003 he produced a recording funded by the Australia Council for his band "Big Wheel". The resulting recording, Little Story was nominated for an ARIA Music Award in 2004 ARIA Music Awards.

Conway is a sought after session musician and has recorded with numerous artists including Shane Howard (Goanna Band) Colin Hay (Men at Work), Jon Lord (Deep Purple), Bob Brozman, Slim Dusty, Jan Preston, Tim Gaze, Dutch Tilders, Anne Kirkpatrick and Pat Drummond. During 2007 and 2008 he recorded and performed with The Brewster Brothers of The Angels fame.

Conway has also composed, produced and recorded music for a broad range of film and radio projects, including the Kennedy Miller telemovie The Riddle of the Stinson and the comedy feature The Honourable Wally Norman which was chosen to open the 2003 Sydney Film Festival.

The Jim Conway Blues, a documentary film celebrating Conway's contribution to Australian music was screened on S.B.S. Television in July 2000. The film won a silver medal for Best Independently Produced Documentary at the Chicago International Film Festival.

A photographic portrait of Conway by renowned photographer Greg Weight won the inaugural Prize for Photographic Portraiture associated with the Archibald Prize.

Conway was diagnosed with multiple sclerosis in 1983 and as a result has been reliant on a wheelchair for a number of years. At the Sydney Paralympics Opening Ceremony he performed a piece of music specially written to feature his harmonica playing.

Due to his increasing disability he announced his retirement from performing in 2014.

== Discography ==
=== Albums ===
| Title | Details |
|---|---|
| Little Story (as Jim Conway's Big Wheel) | Released: 2003; Label: Chief (BASE008); Format: CD |
| Music Deli Presents Jim Conway | Released: July 2008; Label: ABC Music (1777132); Format: CD, download |
| Just So (as Jim Conway's Big Wheel) | Released: 2013; Label: Vitamin (JC2013); Format: CD |

== Awards and nominations ==
=== ARIA Music Awards ===
The ARIA Music Awards is an annual awards ceremony that recognises excellence, innovation, and achievement across all genres of Australian music.

| Year | Nominee / work | Award | Result |
|---|---|---|---|
| 2004 | Little Story (as Jim Conway's Big Wheel) | Best Blues and Roots Album | Nominated |
