= TSS Wahine =

Passenger steamship (1912–1951)

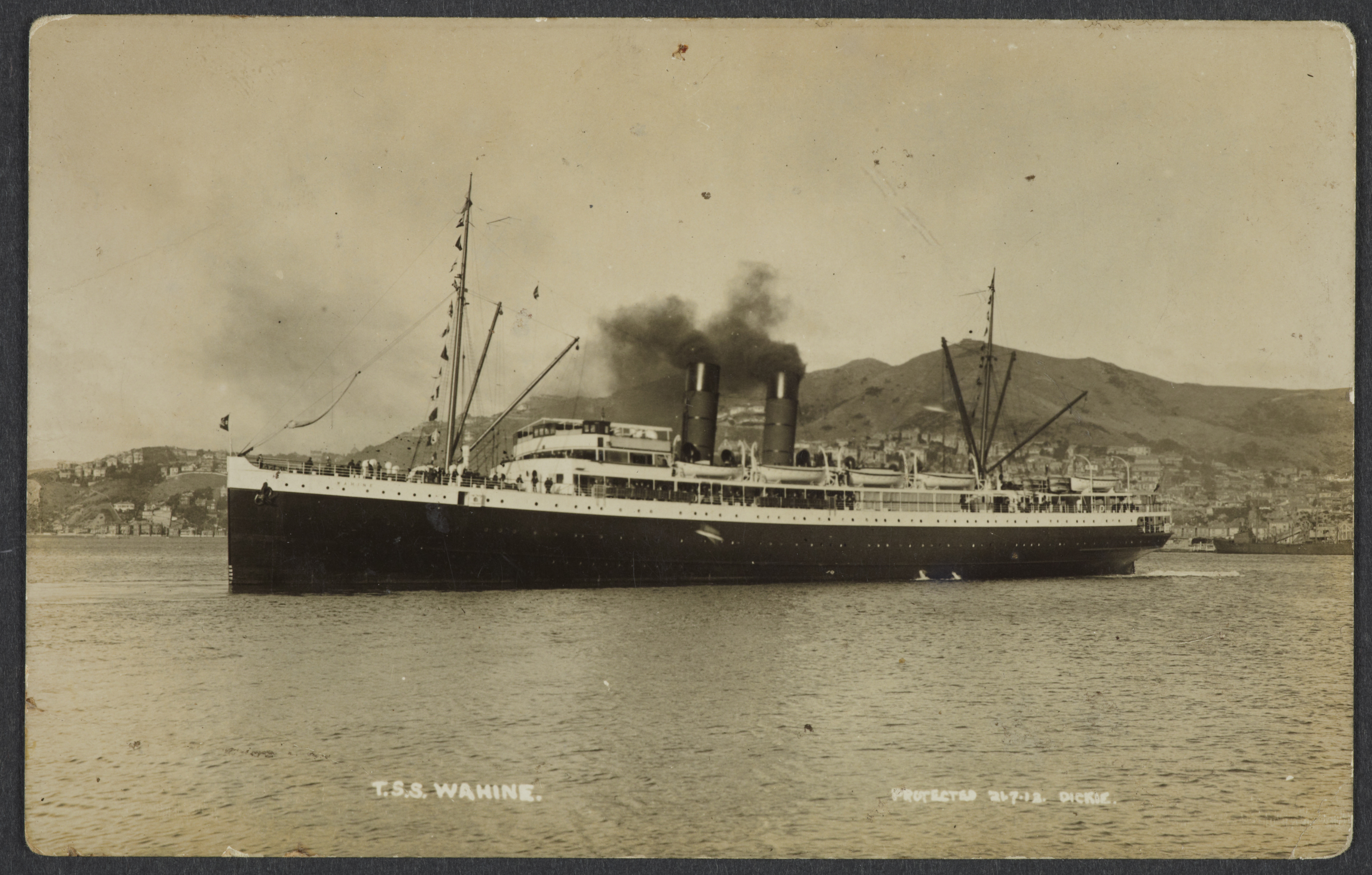
In Wellington Harbour about 1936

TSS Wahine (meaning "woman" in Maori) was a Union Steamship Company passenger steamship that was launched in Scotland in 1912 and wrecked in the Arafura Sea in 1951. She spent most of her career on inter-island ferry route between Wellington and Lyttelton, New Zealand. She was a minelayer in World War I, and a troop ship in World War I, World War II and the Korean War.

William Denny and Brothers built Wahine in Dumbarton as yard number 971. She was launched on 25 November 1912 and completed on 9 April 1913. Her registered length was 375.0 ft (114.3 m), her beam was 52.2 ft (15.9 m) and her depth was 23.7 ft (7.2 m). As built, her tonnages were 4,436 GRT and 1,798 NRT. Wahine had three screws, each driven by a steam turbine. High-pressure steam powered her port and starboard turbines. Exhaust steam from them powered a low-pressure turbine that drove her middle screw. To help her berth at Lyttelton, Wahine had a rudder on her bow as well as one in the conventional place at her stern.

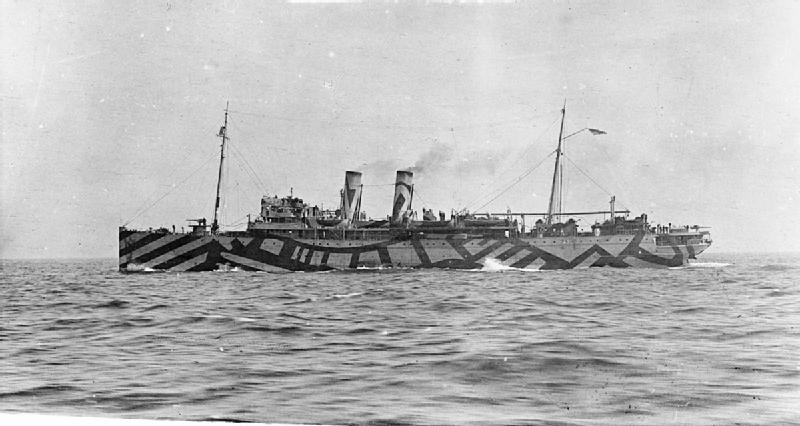
As a minelayer in dazzle camouflage in 1917

The UK Admiralty chartered Wahine in July 1915. She was a troop ship, including in the Gallipoli campaign. In May 1916 she was converted into a minelayer. In March 1919 the Admiralty returned her to her owners, and in February 1920 she returned to the inter-island route.

In November 1941 Wahine became a troop ship again. In January 1942 she was evacuating mostly women and children from Fiji to Auckland when a Japanese submarine tracked her. A US Flying Fortress on escort duty sank the submarine with depth charges. On 19 December 1942 Wahine rammed and sank the minesweeping trawler South Sea inside Wellington Harbour. There was no loss of life.

After World War II the Admiralty returned Wahine to her owners again. In 1946 she was refitted, and in February 1947 she was transferred to the Trans-Tasman Sea service between Wellington and Sydney. She served this route until the end of 1948, when she returned to Wellington as the relief ship for the route to Lyttelton.

In July 1951 the New Zealand Government chartered Wahine to take New Zealand Army Service Corps troops to Korea. On 2 August she left Wellington carrying 577 troops. She called at Cairns, Queensland and Darwin, Northern Territory, where she left on 14 August. At 5:40 a.m. on 15 August she ran hard aground on the Masela Island Reef off Cape Palsu in the Arafura Sea, being held as far aft as her engine room. In response to her distress call, Standard Vacuum Oil Company tanker Stanvac Karachi rescued all aboard. Salvage attempts were unsuccessful and the ship was abandoned as a total loss.
