= John Ramsay =

John Ramsay may refer to:

== Politics ==
- John Ramsay (British Army officer) (1775–1842), general and member of parliament for Aberdeen Burghs, 1806–1807
- John Ramsay (of Kildalton) (1814–1892), member of parliament for Stirling Burghs, 1868, and Falkirk Burghs, 1874–1886
- John Ramsay, 13th Earl of Dalhousie (1847–1887), Scottish politician, member of parliament for Liverpool, 1880
- Jack Ramsay (politician) (born 1937), Canadian politician

== Sports ==
- Jack Ramsay (1925–2014), American basketball coach
- John Ramsay (Australian footballer) (1930–1983), Australian rules footballer
- John Ramsay (footballer, born 1896) (1896–1917), Scottish footballer
- Bill Ramsay (athlete) (1928–1988), Australian middle-distance runner John William Ramsay

== Others ==
- John Ramsay, 1st Lord Bothwell (c. 1464–1513)
- John Ramsay, 1st Earl of Holderness (c. 1580–1626), Scottish nobleman
- John Ramsay of Ochtertyre (1736–1814), Scottish writer
- John Ramsay (businessman) (1841–1924), Scottish-born Australian businessman
- John Ramsay (commissioner) (1862–1942), Chief Commissioner of Balochistan
- John Ramsay (surgeon) (1872–1944), Australian surgeon
- John Ramsay (magician) (1877–1962), Scottish magician
- John Ramsay (1904-1966), son of William Ramsay, founder of Kiwi shoe polish (grandson of businessman John Ramsay (1841–1924), above)
- John Ramsay or Johnny Ramensky (1905–1972), Scottish criminal
- John G. Ramsay (1931–2021), British structural geologist

== See also ==
- John Ramsey (disambiguation)
