= Ave Maria College (Melbourne) =

Location
- Aberfeldie, Melbourne, Victoria; Australia; 37°45′25″S 144°53′53″E

Information
- Type: Independent, day school
- Motto: Latin: Ad Veritatem Per Caritatem (Striving for truth through love)
- Religious affiliations: Roman Catholic (Franciscan Missionaries of Mary)
- Established: 1963; 63 years ago
- Principal: Dane Calleja
- Grades: 7–12
- Gender: Girls
- Affiliation: Alliance of Girls' Schools Australasia
- Website: avemaria.vic.edu.au
- Type: Mansion
- Etymology: Clydebank, Scotland
- Location: 22 Vida Street, Aberfeldie

History
- Built: 1888; 138 years ago
- Built for: John Ramsay
- Original use: Residence

Site notes
- Architectural style: Victorian Italianate
- Current use: School administration

Victorian Heritage Register
- Official name: Former Clydebank
- Type: Registered place
- Designated: 19 June 1997
- Reference no.: H1325
- Heritage overlay no.: HO120
- Category: Residential buildings (private)

Ave Maria College is an independent Catholic secondary school for girls, established in 1963 by the Franciscan Missionaries of Mary (FMM). The school is located in Aberfeldie, an inner western suburb of Melbourne, in Victoria, Australia; and is a member of the Alliance of Girls' Schools Australasia.

The school is located on the grounds of "Clydebank", a former Italianate mansion built in 1888. The former mansion was added to the Victorian Heritage Register on 19 June 1997 in recognition of its historical importance.

== History ==
Renovations to the school property in the last ten years included the glass-roofed piazza with a winter garden, canteen and classrooms, refurbishment of the science and technology departments, and an upgrade to the school library, now known as the Helene Library. In 2019, the school finished its renovations of the Helene building which included a Year 12 dedicated area on the third level with views of the surrounding areas.

=== Heritage listing ===
The former mansion, Clydebank, was built in 1888 for Scottish-Australian Congregational lay preacher and land agent, John Ramsay. Set on 6 hectares (15 acres), Clydebank was initially surrounded by a treed fence line, outbuildings, formal gardens, and surrounding paddocks. The stuccoed, two-storey Italianate mansion had a slate, hipped-roof, and apart from the two-level return cast-iron verandah and parapeted tower, the house displayed little external ornamentation.

The ground floor included many reception rooms, John Ramsay’s study with built-in safe, and bedroom the family referred to as the ‘low bedroom’ or visitor’s room. The drawing room, to the left of the front door, contained a marble fireplace that featured in the background to some of Hugh Ramsay’s family portraits. Behind this room was the dining room containing the onyx mantel where for many years hung the portrait of Jessie Ramsay. Other rooms on this level included a parlour, breakfast room, kitchen, as well as a wash house, scullery and other service rooms. Upstairs there were six bedrooms and a billiard room where paintings by Hugh Ramsay hung until the 1940s. The family bedrooms had access to the very spacious verandah which wrapped around the north east corner of the house, and it is here that three of the Ramsay siblings spent time resting during the last years of their lives. The tower, reached by steep stairs, contained John Ramsay’s telescope. From here could be seen the Macedon Ranges, the Dandenongs and Port Phillip Bay.

John Ramsay prospered and his large family pursued successful careers in their chosen domains. Two sons, William and James founded the Kiwi Boot Polish firm, both predeceasing their father who then acted as chairman for the company. Another son, Sir John Ramsay (Jnr.), became a senior surgeon at Launceston General Hospital. The most celebrated of the sons, Hugh (1877-1906) pursued a short and brilliant career as an artist, prior to his death from tuberculosis. Many of Hugh Ramsay's portraits were painted in a studio — originally quarters for staff of the mansion — at the back of the south west (rear) wing of Clydebank, and several of his works were hung on the building's walls until the Catholic Church purchased the property from the Ramsay family in 1943 and renovations occurred from 1946.

== Location ==
The school is located at 22 Vida Street, in Aberfeldie, in the City of Moonee Valley.

This school is near to other Catholic high schools including St Columba's College and St Bernard's College.

== Houses ==
The four Houses are Mary, Helene, Francis, and Clare. They were previously named after great Australian women, though the names were later changed to connect more strongly with the school's religious foundations. The houses are now named in honour of the Virgin Mary, Helene de Chappotin (Founder of the FMM), St. Clare of Assisi and St. Francis of Assisi.

== Curriculum ==
A broad core curriculum is offered to students in years 7 to 9. Year 10 students construct a program from a combination of core subjects and electives with opportunities to accelerate their learning with Victorian Certificate of Education (VCE) subjects, a Vocational Education and Training (VET) Certificate, or pathway subjects for the VCE Vocational Major.

== School activities ==
Students attend camps in years 7 and 9 as well as a retreat in Year 12. The House swimming and athletics carnival are opportunities for students to represent their house across a wide variety of events and activities. Inter-school sporting activities are included as a part of the school's extracurricular program. Other activities across the School year include, Mission Action Day, Spectacular Spectacular at the College's Foundation Day (Ave Maria Day), College Production, College Choir, STEM and Interdisciplinary Days. The Arts and Technology Festival is a highlight of the College Calendar and showcases the artistic endeavours of students across the College in Visual Art, Textiles, Music, Drama and STEM.

== Notable alumnae ==
- Eloise Southby-Halbish – netballer

== See also ==
- Architecture of Melbourne
- Catholic All Schools Sports Association
- List of high schools in Victoria
- List of places on the Victorian Heritage Register in the City of Moonee Valley
- Victorian Certificate of Education
