= Francis John Drake =

Francis John Drake, MA MB BS (Melb) (12 December 1860 - 17 December 1929) was resident medical superintendent, Launceston Hospital. In 1860, Drake was born at St. Kilda, Melbourne. On 28 April 1879, he began work as a messenger at the Melbourne Public Library with an annual salary of £50. He attended Scotch College from 1875 to 1880. In 1886, he graduated with a BA degree, and in 1887 received the MA degree from Melbourne. In 1888, Drake completed the MB from the University of Melbourne Medical School.

In 1896, the Statistics of the State of Tasmania listed Drake as holding 2 appointments. He was surgeon superintendent at Launceston General Hospital with an annual salary of £400 that included quarters, rations, and fuel. The appointment began on 1 January 1890. Concurrently, Drake held the position as medical officer at the Contagious Diseases Hospital at Launceston.

In 1896, Drake and Dr. John Ramsay participated in the first demonstration of X-rays by Frank Styant Browne at Launceston Hospital.

The February 1898 issue of the Australasian Medical Gazette listed the resignation of Drake from the Launceston Hospital as surgeon-superintendent.

The burial of Drake, who died on 17 December 1929, took place at Box Hill Cemetery. Drake was a specialist in the treatment of tuberculosis. He was surgical superintendent at Launceston General Hospital since 1921. His son was Dr. F.L. Drake of Tasmania.
