= John Ramsey =

John Ramsey may refer to:

- John R. Ramsey (1862–1933), U.S. Representative for New Jersey (1917–1921)
- John Ramsey (died 1551), English clergy
- John Ramsey (pseudonym), pseudonym of British dramatist Reginald Owen (1887–1972)
- John Ramsey (announcer) (1927–1990), Los Angeles-area sports announcer
- John Bennett Ramsey (born 1943), father of JonBenét Ramsey
- John Michael Ramsey (fl. 1974–2013), American analytical chemist
- John A. Ramsey (born 1990), founder of the Liberty for All PAC

== See also ==
- John Ramsay (disambiguation)
- JonBenét Ramsey (1990–1996), American child beauty pageant contestant who was murdered in her home in Boulder, Colorado, in 1996
