= Misdirection (magic) =

Form of theatrical deception

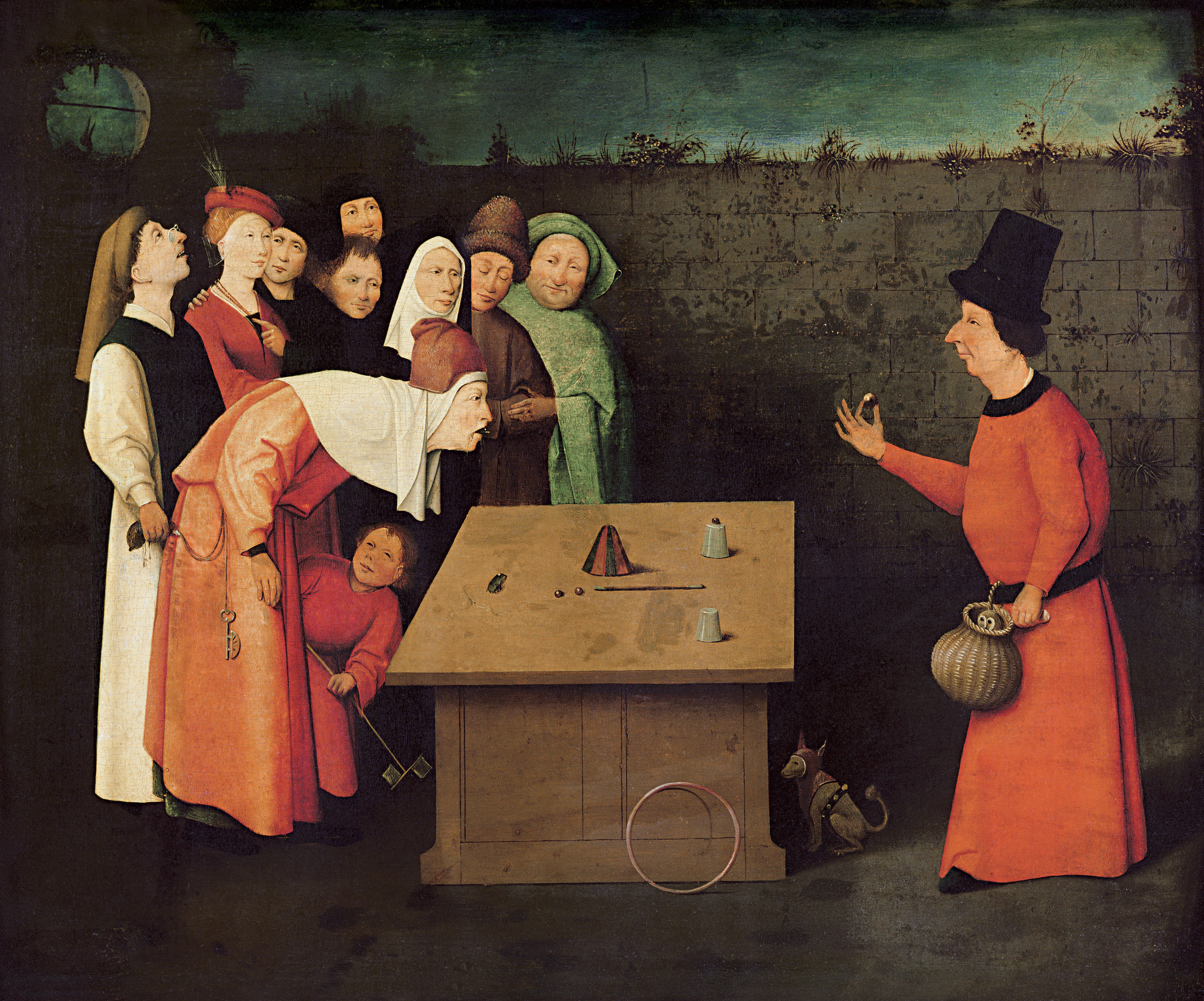
In Hieronymus Bosch's painting The Conjurer, the figure on the left steals an item from an audience member who is intently watching the performance of a magic trick.

In theatrical magic, misdirection is a form of deception in which the performer draws audience attention to one thing to distract it from another. Managing audience attention is the aim of all theater, and the foremost requirement of all magic acts. Whether the magic is of a "pocket trick" variety or a large stage production, misdirection is the central secret. The term describes either the effect (the observer's focus on an unimportant object) or the sleight of hand or patter (the magician's speech) that creates it.

It is difficult to say who coined the term, but an early reference to misdirection appears in the writing of an influential performer and writer, Nevil Maskelyne: "It consists admittedly in misleading the spectator's senses, in order to screen from detection certain details for which secrecy is required." Around the same time, magician, artist and author Harlan Tarbell noted, "Nearly the whole art of sleight of hand depends on this art of misdirection."

Henry Hay describes the central act of conjuring as "a manipulation of interest."

Magicians misdirect audience attention in two basic ways. One leads the audience to look away for a fleeting moment, so that they don't detect some sleight or move. The other approach re-frames the audience's perception, distracting them into thinking that an extraneous factor has much to do with the accomplishment of the feat when it really has no bearing on the effect at all. Dariel Fitzkee notes that "The true skill of the magician is in the skill he exhibits in influencing the spectators mind." Additionally, sometimes a prop such as a "magic wand" aids in misdirection.

== Use ==
In The Encyclopedia of Magic and Magicians, author T.A. Waters writes that "Misdirection is the cornerstone of nearly all successful magic; without it, even the most skilled Sleight of Hand or mechanical device is unlikely to create an illusion of real magic." Misdirection uses the limits of the human mind to give the wrong picture and memory. The mind of a typical audience member can only concentrate on one thing at a time. The magician uses this to manipulate the audience's ideas or perceptions of sensory input, leading them to false conclusions.

The performer can direct the audience's attention in various ways. In the book The Secret Art of Magic, authors Eric Evans and Nowlin Craver posit that magic is directly related to warfare, and relies on the same principles for success. They reference Sun Tzu's Art of War to show how deception is essential to any successful campaign. Craver goes on to illustrate, through the 36 strategies, how they form a blueprint for every known method of misdirection. In World War II, British military intelligence employed stage magician Jasper Maskelyne to help devise various forms of misdirection such as ruses, deception, and camouflage.

Magicians who have researched and evolved misdirection techniques include Max Malini, John Ramsay, Tommy Wonder, Derren Brown, Juan Tamariz, Tony Slydini, and Dai Vernon.

== Definitions ==
In his 1948 book, Principles and Deceptions, Arthur Buckley questions the accuracy of the term. Since that time, magicians have debated use of the term misdirection, creating a great deal of discussion about what it is and how it works. Buckley drew a distinction between misdirection and direction. One being a negative term, and the other positive. Ultimately, he equates the two as the same thing: "If a performer by some means has directed the thoughts of his audience to the conclusion that he has done something which he has not done, he has wrongly directed them into this belief, hence, misdirection."

Jacobus Maria Bemelman, under the stage name Tommy Wonder, has pointed out that it is much more effective, from the magician's point of view, to concentrate on the positive aim of directing the audience's attention. He writes that "Misdirection implies 'wrong' direction. It suggests that attention is directed away from something. By constantly using this term, it eventually becomes so ingrained in our minds that we might start to perceive misdirection as directing attention away from rather than toward something."

In his October-November 2019 United States "Slydini Inspiration" lecture tour, Tony Slydini protege' Bill Wisch combined two definitions of Tony Slydini's into one coherent one. Bill explained that when he asked Slydini "What is misdirection?", Slydini would repeat "if you believe it, they'll believe it" and "magic is something they don't see." Bill's combined definition: "Misdirection is true when they believe what you do and then follow you."

== See also ==
- Optical illusion
- Secrecy
