= Art Gallery of South Australia =

- Front view of the art gallery, 2026
- Interactive fullscreen map
- Established: 1881
- Location: North Terrace, Adelaide, Australia
- Coordinates: 34°55′14″S 138°36′14″E
- Type: Art gallery
- Visitors: 780,000 (2019)
- Director: Jason Smith (February 2025 – present)
- Website: www.agsa.sa.gov.au

South Australian Heritage Register
- Official name: Art Gallery (former National Gallery) of South Australia
- Designated: 24 July 1980
- Reference no.: 10871

The Art Gallery of South Australia (AGSA), established as the National Gallery of South Australia in 1881, is located in Adelaide. It is the most significant visual arts museum in the Australian state of South Australia. It has a collection of almost 45,000 works of art, making it the second largest state art collection in Australia (after the National Gallery of Victoria). As part of North Terrace cultural precinct, the gallery is flanked by the South Australian Museum to the west and Adelaide University to the east. Jason Smith has been director of AGSA since February 2025.

As well as its permanent collection, which is especially renowned for its collection of Australian art, AGSA hosts the annual Festival of Contemporary Aboriginal and Torres Strait Islander Art known as Tarnanthi, displays a number of visiting exhibitions each year and also contributes travelling exhibitions to regional galleries. European (including British), Asian and North American art are also well represented in its collections.

== History ==
=== Conception ===
On 13 October 1856 Charles Hill proposed the establishment of the South Australian Society of Arts (later the Royal South Australian Society of Arts) to promote the arts through lectures, conversazioni, and an art school, first conducted in his own home, as well as stirring support for a permanent gallery. After enrolling 60 members, the Society was formally established, with Hill serving as the first Chairman. Its first exhibition was held in 1857.

=== Establishment ===
Five months prior to Charles Hill's proposal, the South Australian Institute was established by Act of Council with six Governors overseeing a Public Library and Museum, to encourage art, science, literature and philosophy. The Institute also incorporated other cultural societies by giving them access to rooms in the Institute Building and in appending their annual reports to the Institute's own.

The South Australian Society of Arts was incorporated to the Institute in 1859 and held annual exhibitions in the Institute rooms, as well as advocating for a public art collection. In 1880, Parliament gave £2,000 to the Institute to start acquiring a collection and the National Gallery of South Australia was established in June 1881 with 22 works purchased at the Melbourne International Exhibition, together with others lent by Queen Victoria, the Prince of Wales, the British Government and private collectors. It was opened in two rooms of the public library (now the Mortlock Wing of the State Library), by Prince Albert Victor and Prince George. In 1889 the collection was moved to the Jubilee Exhibition Building, where it remained for ten years. On 6 March 1897 Sir Thomas Elder died, bequeathing £25,000 to the art gallery for the purchase of artworks. This was the first major endowment to any Australian gallery, seven years before the Felton Bequest to the NGV.

=== Buildings ===
In response to the Elder Bequest, the Government commissioned a specially designed building (now the Elder Wing) and pushed ahead with all due speed to provide employment for skilled tradesmen in a time of economic recession. The building was designed by C. E. Owen Smyth in Classical Revival style, built by Trudgen Brothers, (Note: Sons of contractor and mayor of St Peters, Nicholas Wallis Trudgen (died 1892) they went out of business shortly afterwards.) and opened by the Governor, Lord Tennyson on 7 April 1900.

Originally built with an enclosed portico, a 1936 refurbishment and enlargement included a new facade with an open Doric portico.

Major extensions in 1962 (including a three-storey air-conditioned addition on the northern side), 1979 (general refurbishment, in time for its centenary in 1981) and 1996 (large expansion) increased the gallery's display, administrative and ancillary facilities further.

The building is listed in the South Australian Heritage Register.

As of 2019, the building houses 64kWh worth of solar battery storage as part of the Government of South Australia Storage Demonstration project, powered by three 7.5kW Selectronic inverters. This reduces the consumption of power from the state grid.

=== Governance ===
In 1939, an act of parliament, the Libraries and Institutes Act 1939, repealed the Public library, Museum and Art Gallery and Institutes Act and separated the Gallery from the Public Library (now the State Library), and Museum. The Gallery established its own board and changed its name to the Art Gallery of South Australia.

The Art Gallery Act 1939 was passed to provide for the control of the library. This has been amended several times since.

In 1967 the National Gallery of South Australia changed its name to the Art Gallery of South Australia.

Ballarat-born David Thomas was appointed Director in 1976. He had taken a Bachelor of Fine Arts at the University of Melbourne, had been Keeper of the Pictorial Collections at the National Library of Australia, Canberra 1963-65, and Director of the Newcastle City Art Gallery in 1965-75. In 1983 he left AGSA to become Director of Adelaide's Carrick Hill House Museum & Garden, and from 1987-1995 was Director of Bendigo Art Gallery. Thomas died in 2022.

From 1996 until late 2018, Arts SA (later Arts South Australia) had responsibility for the gallery and several other statutory bodies such as the Museum and the State Library, after which the functions were transferred to direct oversight by the Department of the Premier and Cabinet, Arts and Culture section.

Christopher Menz was director of the gallery until 2010, when he refused to renew his five-year contract because he believed that government funding to the gallery was inadequate.

Nick Mitzevich was appointed as director in July 2010, when he was hardly known in SA. During this time, he acquired and commissioned works that would make an impression on the public, such as projecting an AES+F video work onto the gallery's façade during the Adelaide Fringe in 2012, and buying an entire exhibition of 16 paintings by Ben Quilty on the 130th anniversary of AGSA. He also hung We Are All Flesh, an epoxy resin sculpture of two headless horses by Belgian artist Berlinde De Bruyckere, from the ceiling of the gallery, which attracted much press coverage. His overall approach was to display contemporary works in close proximity to classics. Although he had a few detractors, the general opinion was that he had done a fine job at AGSA. His achievements included curating the highly successful 2014 Adelaide Biennial, the purchase of Camille Pissarro's Prairie à Eragny, with its A$4.5 million price raised from donations only. He also oversaw a major internal refurbishment of the gallery, introduced the Tarnanthi festival, hosted large-scale exhibitions, and greatly increased the collection of both contemporary Australian and international art. Annual visitor numbers increased from 480,000 in 2010 to 800,000 by the time of his departure. He was the first gallery director in Australia to implement a provenance project, which investigates old objects which were acquired without historical checks.

After the departure of Mitzevich, who left to lead the National Gallery of Australia in April 2018, the first female director in the history of AGSA was appointed. On 22 October of that year, Australian-born Rhana Devenport ONZM started her appointment after leaving the Auckland Art Gallery, where she had been director since 2013. In March 2024 Devenport announced that she would depart after her contract ended on 7 July 2024, having served for six years.

In June 2024, Lisa Slade, who joined the gallery in 2011 as project curator and was appointed assistant director, artistic programs, in 2015, announced her departure from 3 July 2024, after being appointed Hugh Ramsay Chair in Australian Art History at the University of Melbourne, a position based in the Art History Program in the School of Culture and Communication.

== Current governance ==
On 13 June 2025, the Governor of South Australia, Frances Adamson, and her husband Rod Bunten were named as the inaugural patrons of the gallery. Their main role is "advocacy on a national and international scale".

In February 2025 Jason Smith, former director of the Geelong Gallery, Heide Museum of Modern Art, and Monash Gallery of Art, began his term as director of AGSA. He remains director as of September 2026.

== Collection ==
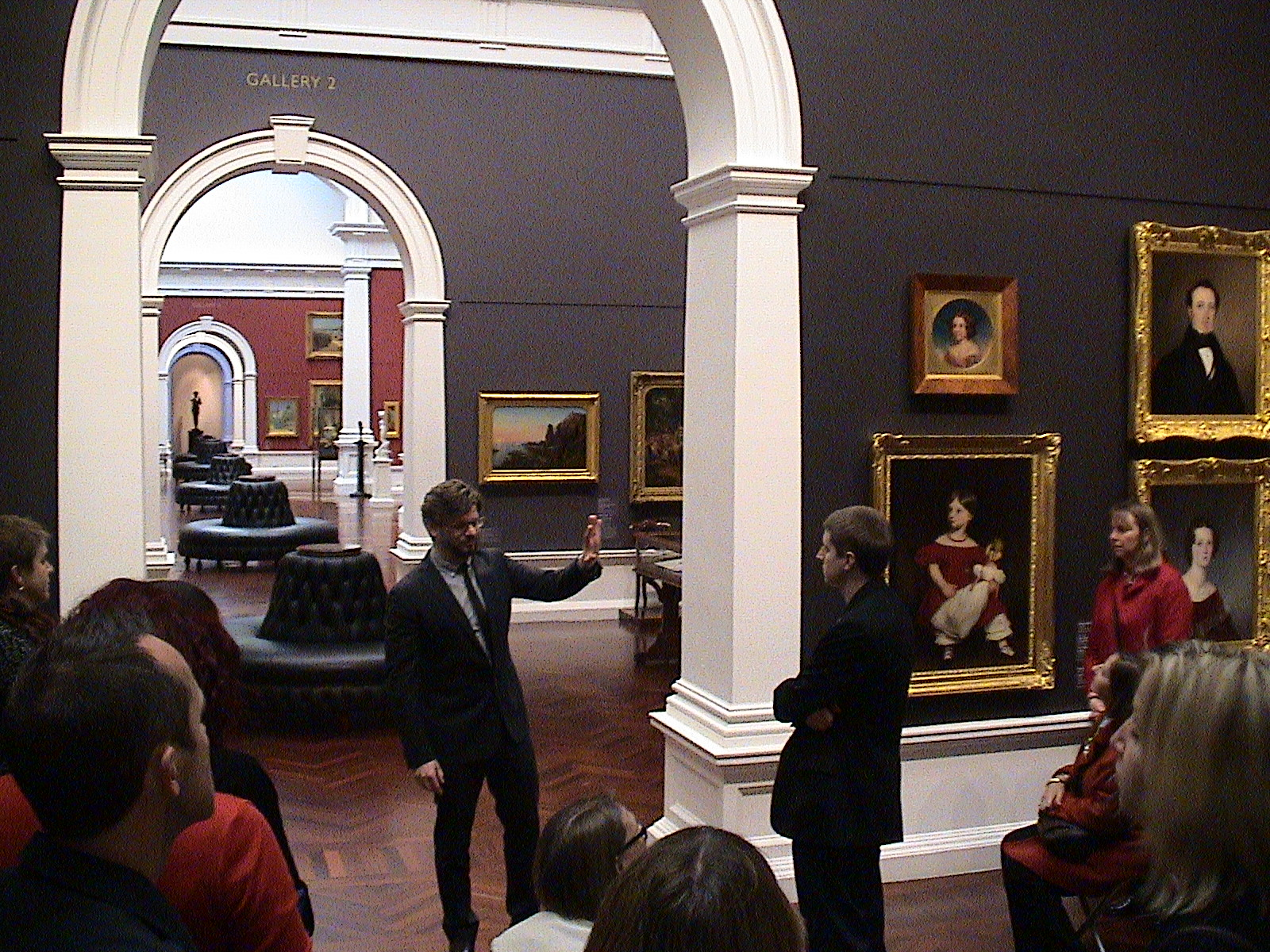
AGSA director Nick Mitzevich addressing Museums Australia conference delegates, 2012

As of May 2019, the AGSA collection comprises almost 45,000 works of art. Of the state galleries, only the National Gallery of Victoria is larger. It attracts about 512,000 visitors each year.

Lindy Lee's 6-metre (20 ft) sculpture "The Life of Stars" is mounted on the forecourt of the gallery, after being presented for the 2018 Biennial, Divided Worlds. Created in Shanghai in 2015, the sculpture's polished stainless steel surface reflects its surroundings during the day and radiates light at night. Over 30,000 perforated holes individually placed by Lee resemble a map of our galaxy when lit from within. The sculpture was bought by the gallery as a farewell "gift" for and tribute to departing director Nick Mitzevich in April 2018.

=== Australian art ===
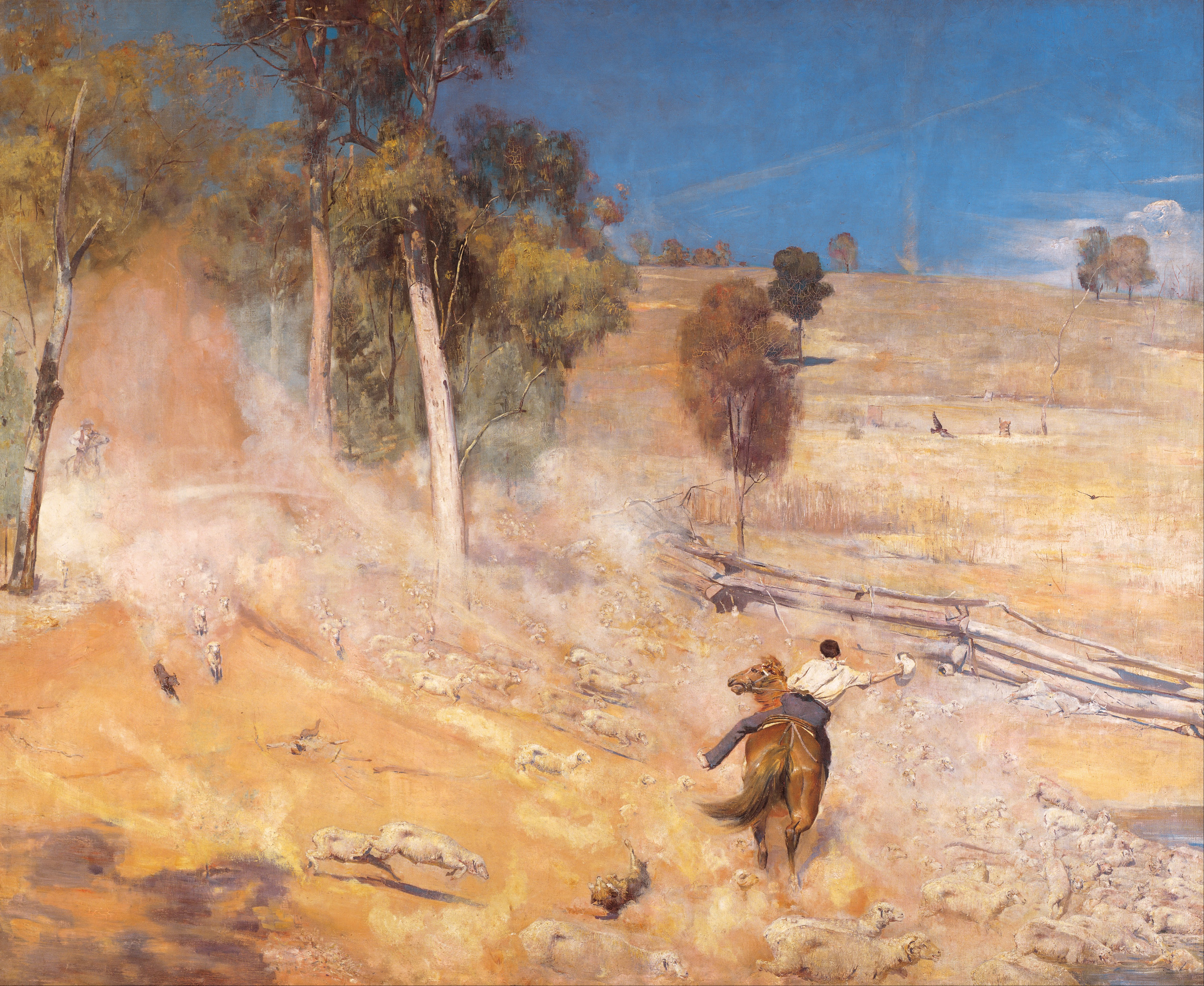
Tom Roberts, A break away!, 1891

The gallery is renowned for its collections of Australian art, including Indigenous Australian and colonial art, from about 1800 onwards. The collection is strong in nineteenth-century works (including silverware and furniture) and in particular Australian Impressionist (often referred to as Heidelberg School) paintings. Its twentieth-century Modernist art collection includes the work of many female artists, and there is a large collection of South Australian art, which includes 2,000 drawings by Hans Heysen and a large collection of photographs.

Heidelberg school works include Tom Roberts' A break away!, Charles Conder's A holiday at Mentone, and Arthur Streeton's Road to Templestowe. The mid-twentieth century is represented by works by Russell Drysdale, Arthur Boyd, Margaret Preston, Bessie Davidson, and Sidney Nolan, and South Australian art includes works by James Ashton and Jeffrey Smart.

The gallery became the first Australian gallery to acquire a work by an Indigenous artist in 1939, although systematic acquisition of Aboriginal and Torres Strait Islander art was not realised until the mid-1950s. The Gallery and now holds a large and diverse collection of older and contemporary works, including the Kulata Tjuta collaboration created by Aṉangu artists working in the north of SA.

In May 2026 the gallery acquired a rare landscape painting by Dorrit Black, titled Sicilian mountain, to add to its collection of around 70 works by this Adelaide-born artist.

=== International ===
European landscape paintings include works by Jacob Isaakszoon van Ruisdael, Salomon van Ruysdael, Joseph Wright of Derby, and Camille Pissarro. Other European works include paintings by Goya, Francesco Guardi, Pompeo Batoni and Camille Corot.

There is a large collection of British art, including many Pre-Raphaelite works, by artists Edward Burne-Jones, William Holman Hunt, Dante Gabriel Rossetti and Morris & Co. Other works include John William Waterhouse's Circe Invidiosa (1892) and The Favourites of the Emperor Honorius (c.1883); William Holman Hunt's Christ and the Two Marys (1847) and The Risen Christ with the Two Marys in the Garden Of Joseph of Aramathea (1897); and John Collier's Priestess of Delphi (1891). Works by British portrait painters include Robert Peake, Anthony van Dyck, Peter Lely and Thomas Gainsborough.

Sculpture includes works by Rodin, Henry Moore, Barbara Hepworth, Jacob Epstein and Thomas Hirschhorn.

The Asian art collection, begun in 1904, includes work from the whole region, with focuses on the pre-modern Japanese art, art of Southeast Asia, India and the Middle East. The Gallery holds Australia's only permanent display of Islamic art.

The Tale of the Heike, c. 1700

== Exhibitions and collaborations ==
As well as its permanent collection, AGSA hosts the Adelaide Biennial of Australian Art, displays a number of visiting exhibitions each year and contributes travelling exhibitions to regional galleries.

=== Adelaide Biennial of Australian Art ===
The Adelaide Biennial is "the only major biennial dedicated solely to presenting contemporary Australian art", and also the longest-running exhibition featuring contemporary Australian art. It is supported by the Australia Council and other sponsors. It is presented in association with the Adelaide Festival and staged by AGSA and partner gallery the Samstag Museum, as well as other venues such as the Adelaide Botanic Garden, Mercury Cinema and JamFactory.

The Adelaide Biennial was established in 1990 and planned to coincide with Artist's Week, which had commenced in 1982 to help counter the poor coverage of visual art in the Adelaide Festival of Arts programme at that time. The Art Gallery of New South Wales introduced an exhibition of Australian art called Australian Perspecta in 1981, which ran in alternate years with the international Biennale of Sydney, in response for the need for more forums focusing on Australian art. In its first iteration in 1990, The Adelaide Biennial set out to emulate the Whitney Biennial of American art in New York City, and was intended to complement the Sydney Biennale and the Australian Perspecta exhibitions. Then director Daniel Thomas said that they had introduced the Biennial to keep Australia up to date: the Festival attracts international and interstate visitors and it was a good time to introduce contemporary Australian art to this audience. Artists such as Fiona Hall, whose work is now in the National Gallery of Art, were showcased at the first Biennial. The exhibition today still projects Thomas' vision, with the most noticeable difference being that the current version has a theme and a catchy title.

==== Selected events ====
The 2014 Biennial was titled "Dark Heart", an examination of changing national sensibilities, mounted by director Nick Mitzevitch, with 28 artists exhibiting.

In 2016, the gallery participated in the large "Biennial 2016" art festival with its "Magic Object" exhibitions.

In 2018, the title was "Divided Worlds", which aimed "...to describe the divide between ideas and ideologies, between geographies and localities, between communities and nations, and the subjective and objective view of experience and reality itself". Venues included the Museum of Economic Botany in the Adelaide Botanic Garden. It drew record crowds, with more than 240,000 people over a 93-day season under curator Erica Green.

Curator for the 2020 Biennial, which was scheduled to run from 29 February to 8 June 2020, was Leigh Robb, inaugural Curator of Contemporary Art appointed in 2016. The title was "Monster Theatres", examining "our relationships with each other, the environment and technology" and featured a lot of live art. Paintings, photography, sculpture, textiles, film, video, sound art, installation, and performance art by 23 artists were featured, including work by Abdul Abdullah, Stelarc, David Noonan, Garry Stewart and Australian Dance Theatre, Megan Cope, Karla Dickens, Julia Robinson, performance artist Mike Parr, Polly Borland, Willoh S. Weiland, Yhonnie Scarce (whose work In the Dead House was installed in the old Adelaide Lunatic Asylum morgue building in the Botanic Garden) and others. However, AGSA had to temporarily close from 25 March 2020 owing to the COVID-19 pandemic in Australia, so some of the exhibits were shown online, along with virtual tours of the exhibition. When the gallery reopened on 8 June, it was announced that the exhibition period would be extended to 2 August 2020.

The 2022 event was called Free/State, and among others featured the work of Hossein Valamanesh, who died in February, and his wife Angela Valamanesh. It ran from 4 March to 5 June, and was curated by Sydney-based Burramattagal man Sebastian Goldspink. The theme was inspired by the history of South Australia as a "free colony", and also had resonances with states of being and psychology, and contrasting ideas of freedom. Other artists featured include Shaun Gladwell, JD Reformer, Tom Polo, Rhoda Tjitayi, Stanislava Pinchuk, and collaborators James Tylor and Rebecca Selleck.

In 2026, Yield Strength, curated by Ellie Buttrose, featured the work of 24 artists from around Australia, including Archie Moore, Erika Scott, Lauren Burrow, Nathan Beard, and Josina Pumani. The works were displayed in AGSA, the Samstag Museum of Art, and the Adelaide Botanic Garden.

The curator of the 2028 event, which will run from 3 March to 4 June, is Mark Feary, artistic director of Gertrude Contemporary in Melbourne.

=== Tarnanthi ===
Since 2015, AGSA has hosted and supported events connected with Tarnanthi (pronounced tar-nan-dee), the Festival of Contemporary Aboriginal and Torres Strait Islander Art. The 2015 exhibition was said to be the "most ambitious exhibition of Aboriginal and Torres Strait Islander art in its 134-year history". In association with the Government of South Australia and BHP, an expansive city-wide festival is staged biennially (in odd-numbered years), alternating with a focus exhibition at the gallery in the years in between.

=== Other notable exhibitions ===
==== 1906: The Light of the World ====
In 1906, when William Holman Hunt's The Light of the World was on display, 18,168 visitors crammed through the gallery in less than two weeks to see it.

==== 2026: Monet to Matisse: Defying Tradition ====
An exhibition titled Monet to Matisse: Defying Tradition, began on 11 July 2026. The exhibition was mounted with the support of the state government, as part of AGSA's Winter Art Series. The exhibition includes 57 works of 19th and 20th century European and American art on loan from Ohio's Toledo Museum of Art in Toledo, Ohio, including Van Gogh, Monet, Matisse, and Picasso, as well as over 35 works from AGSA's own collection.

== Sponsorship and prizes ==
Diana Ramsay (7 May 1926 – 2017) and her husband James Ramsay (1923–1996) were art-lovers who gave generously to the art gallery. As of 2021 the gallery had acquired over 100 artworks thanks to their generosity, including paintings by Vanessa Bell, Clarice Beckett, Angelica Kauffmann and Camille Pissarro. Diana launched the Ramsay Art Prize in 2016, a year before her death, and the couple's legacy lives on in the James & Diana Ramsay Foundation, established in 2008. The bequest was established by James' will in 1994, and upon Diana's death in 2017, James' entire estate and part of Diana's was bequeathed to it. The Foundation supports the children and family programs, whereby more than 300,000 children and families have visited AGSA since the creation of the programs in 2013. In November 2019 it was announced that the couple had made a bequest of A$38 million to AGSA, to be used for the purchase of major works. This was one of the largest bequests ever made to an art gallery in Australia. The family's wealth had accrued mainly thanks to James’ uncle William, who was responsible for developing Kiwi boot polish, and his artist brother Hugh Ramsay influenced the family's love of the visual arts. James' father was Sir John Ramsay, noted surgeon.

=== Ramsay Art Prize ===
In 2016, a new national $100,000 acquisitive art prize for artists, open to Australian artists under 40 working in any medium, was announced by the Premier of South Australia, Jay Weatherill. Supported by the James & Diana Ramsay Foundation (and launched by Diana on her 90th birthday), it is the country's richest art prize, awarded biennially. Chosen by an international judging panel, all finalists are exhibited in a major exhibition over the winter months at the Gallery. There is also a non-acquisitive Lipman Karas People's Choice Prize based on public vote, worth $15,000.

==== 2017 ====
In its inaugural year, over 450 young artists submitted entries. From the 21 finalists selected for the exhibition, Perth-born artist Sarah Contos, now based in Sydney, won the prize for her entry entitled Sarah Contos Presents: The Long Kiss Goodbye. Julie Fragar's 2016 painting Goose Chase: All of Us Together Here and Nowhere, which explores the story of Antonio de Fraga, her first paternal ancestor to emigrate to Australia in the 19th century, won the People's Choice Award.

==== 2019 ====
In 2019, 23 finalists were chosen from a field of 350 submissions. Vincent Namatjira won the main prize with his work Close Contact, 2018, a double-sided full-body representation of a man, in acrylic paint on plywood. Winner of the People's Choice Prize was 24-year-old Zimbabwean man Pierre Mukeba (the youngest finalist) for his 3 metres (9.8 ft) by 4 metres (13 ft) painting entitled Ride to Church, inspired by childhood memories of the whole family perched somewhat precariously on a single motorbike to travel to church.

==== 2021 ====
In 2021, 24 finalists were chosen from more than 350 entries. South Australian finalists included the work of musician and painter Zaachariaha Fielding (of the duo Electric Fields) and Yurndu (Sun), by Port Augusta artist Juanella McKenzie, while Melbourne-based Iranian photographer Hoda Afshar's series entitled Agonistes was also selected. The prize was won by South Australian artist Kate Bohunnis, for her work entitled edge of excess, a kinetic sculpture, while Hoda Afshar won the People's Choice Prize with her photographic work, Agonistes.

==== 2023 ====
In 2023, 26 finalists were chosen from more than 300 entries. The South Australian artist Ida Sophia won the prize with her video installation witness. Zaachariaha Fielding won the $15,000 People's Choice prize, with his multi-panel work Wonder Drug.

==== 2025 ====
In 2025, there were 22 finalists, announced in April, with the exhibition to run from 31 May to 31 August 2025. Perth-born, Sydney-based artist Jack Ball won the prize for his work Heavy Grit, described as "a large-scale mixed media installation partly inspired by historic press coverage of trans and queer lives from the 1950s to the 1970s".

=== Guildhouse Fellowship ===
The Guildhouse Fellowship is also supported by the James & Diana Ramsay Foundation, and presented in partnership with AGSA. Inaugurated in 2019, the fellowship is intended for mid-career artists, to support opportunities to expand their research and further explore their creative potential. It offers $35,000 to support research and development, including the creation of new work, which is then acquired by the gallery.

Past recipients of the fellowship include:

- 2019: Troy-Anthony Baylis
- 2020: Sera Waters, textile artist
- 2021: Liam Fleming, glass artist
- 2022: Tom Phillips, painter
- 2023: Kyoko Hashimoto, jewellery designer
- 2024: Michelle Nikou, sculptor

== Gallery ==
Selected Australian works

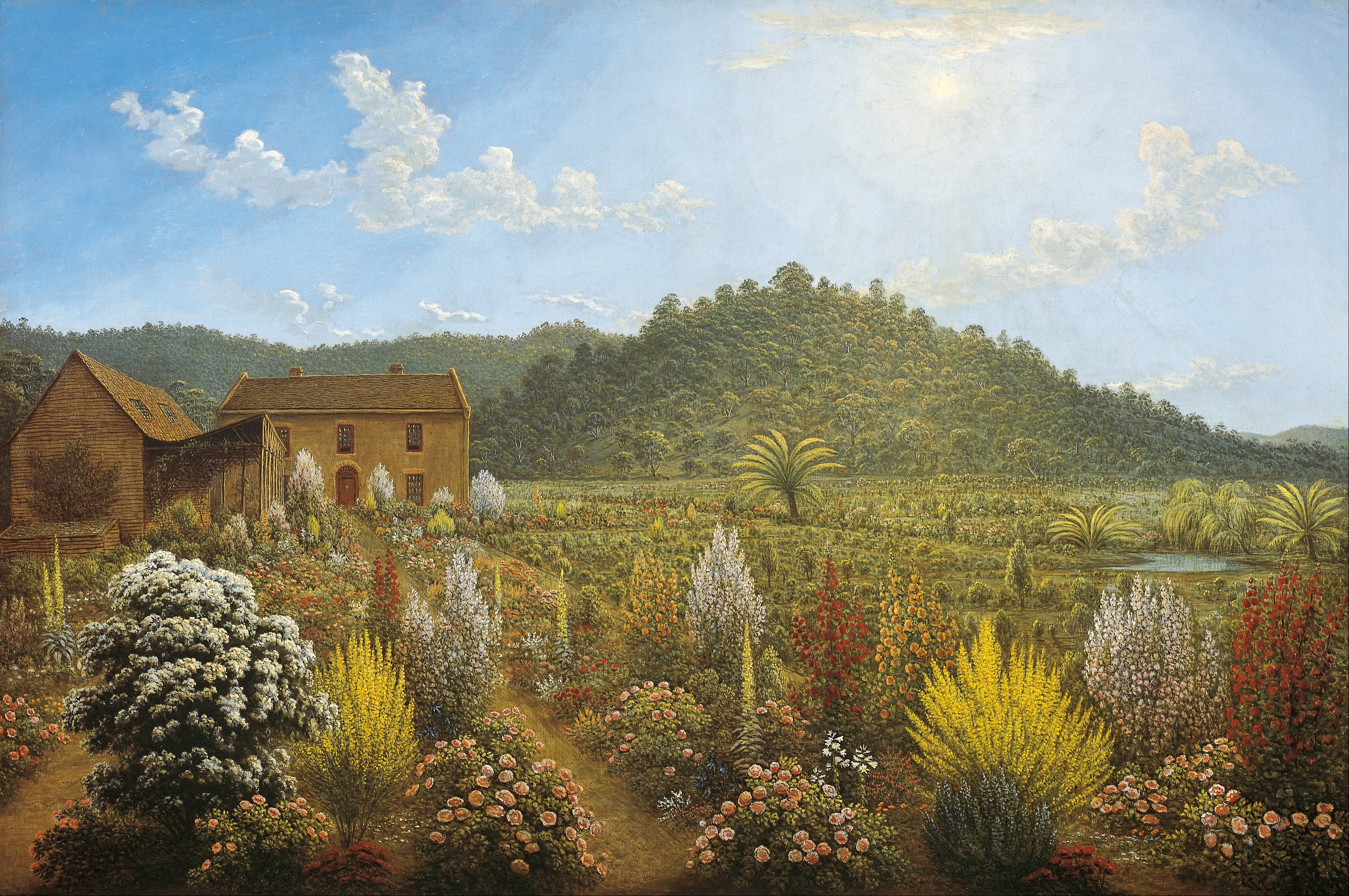
John Glover, A view of the artist's house and garden, in Mills Plains, Van Diemen's Land, 1835

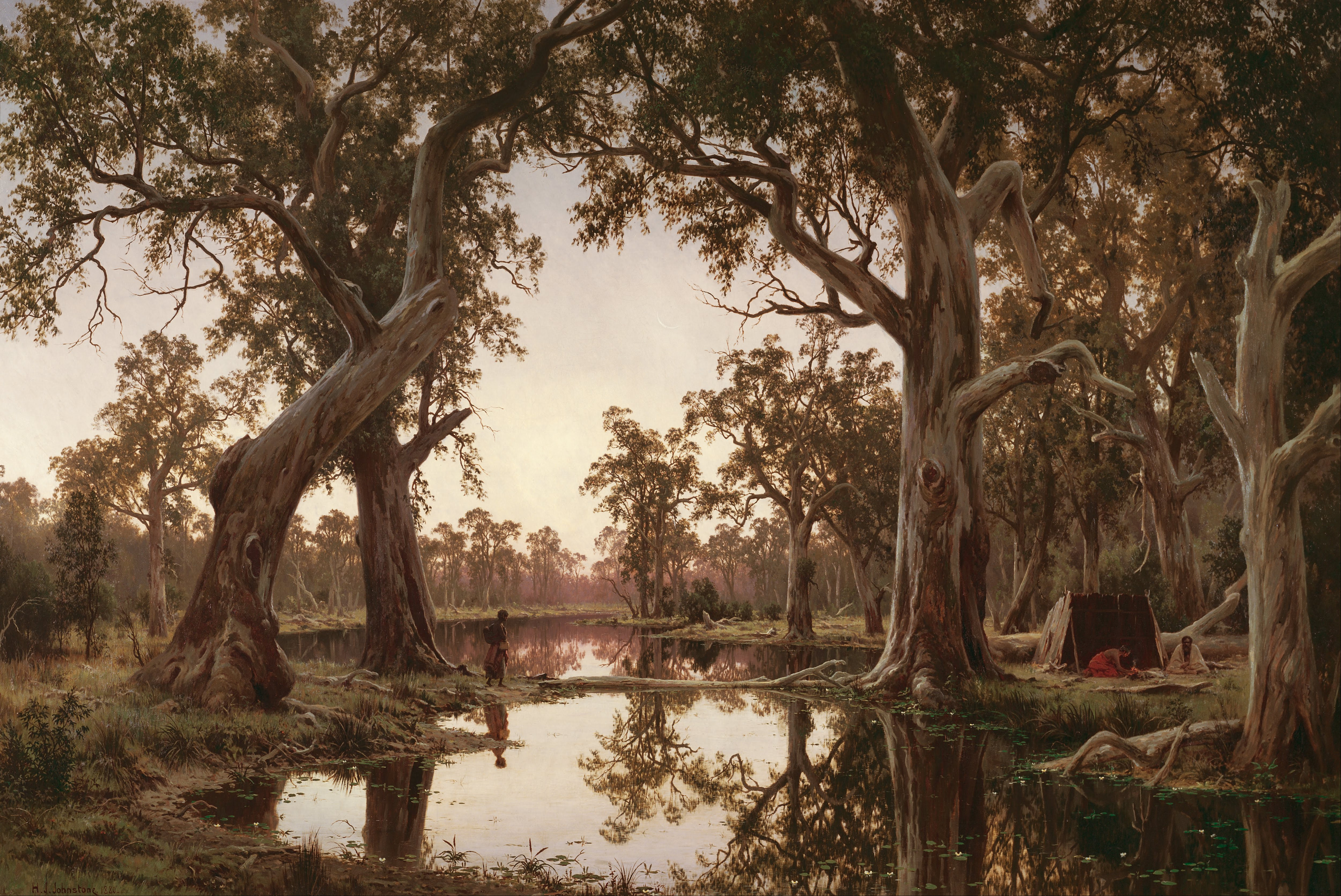
H. J. Johnstone, Evening shadows, backwater of the Murray, South Australia, 1880

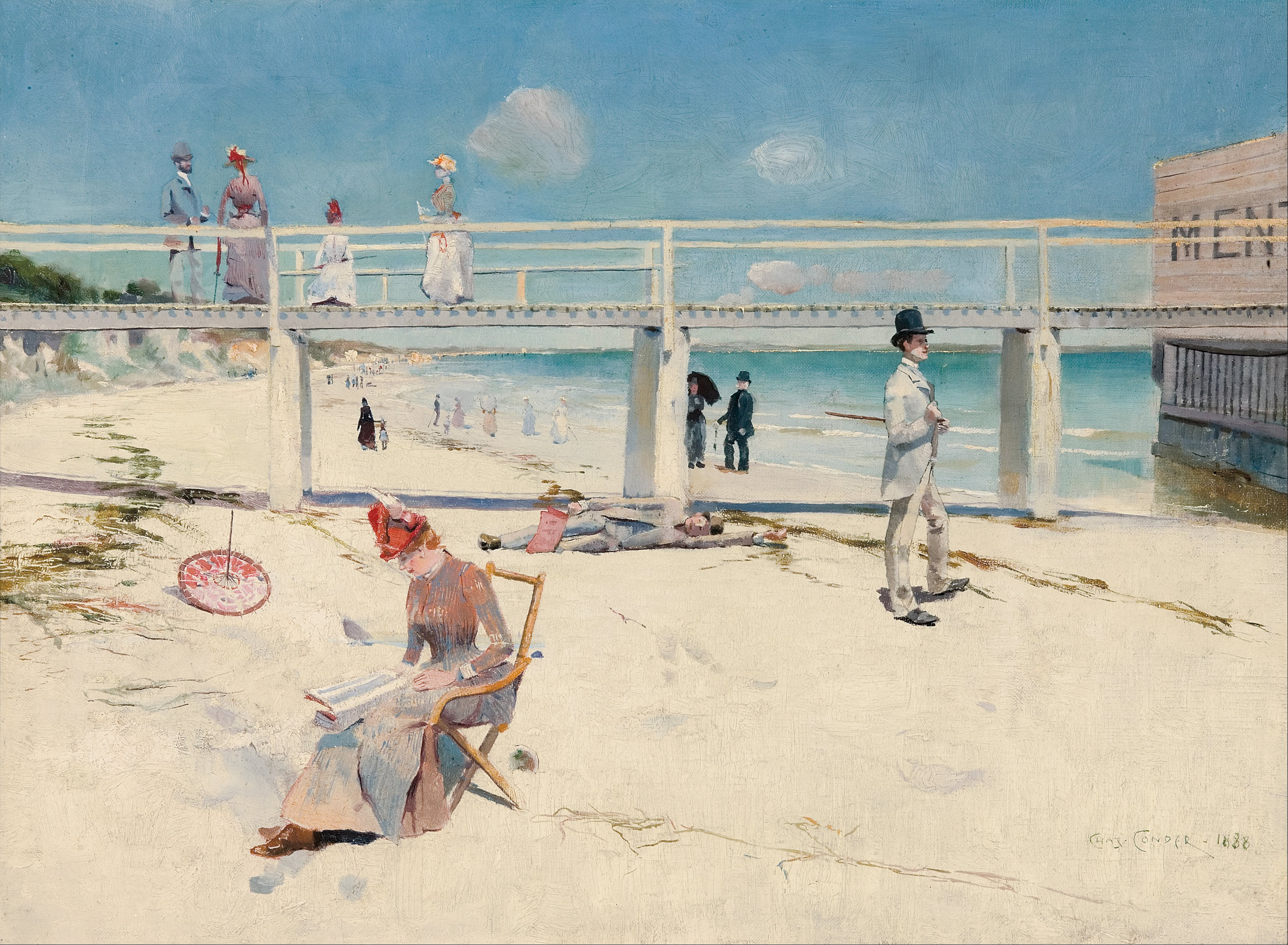
Charles Conder, A holiday at Mentone, 1888

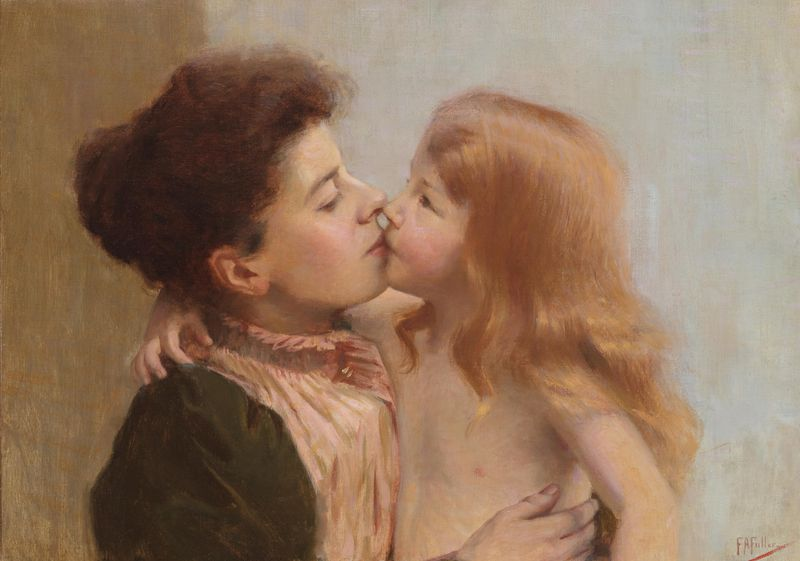
Florence Fuller, Mother and Child, c. 1890

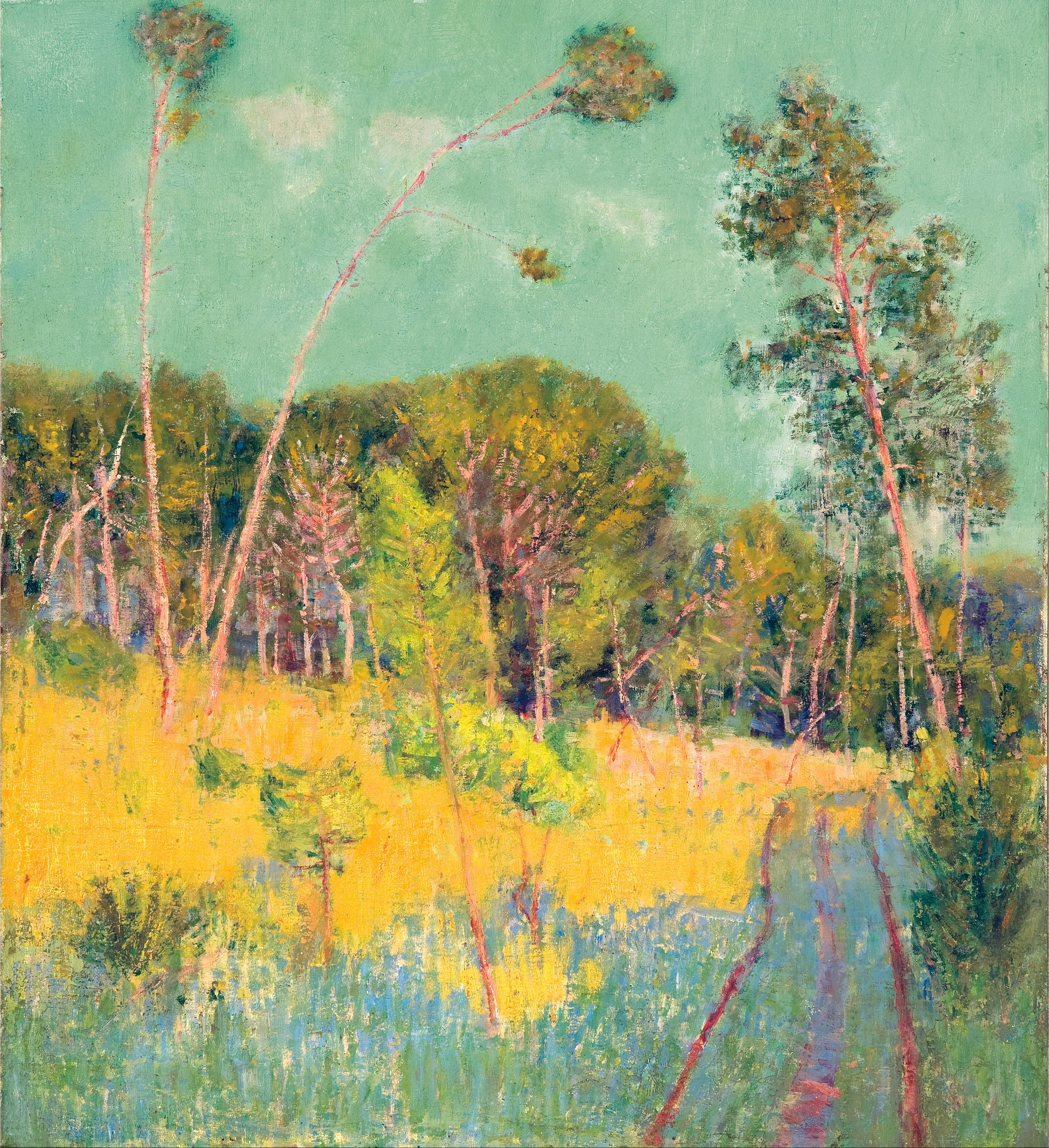
John Russell, A clearing in the forest, 1891

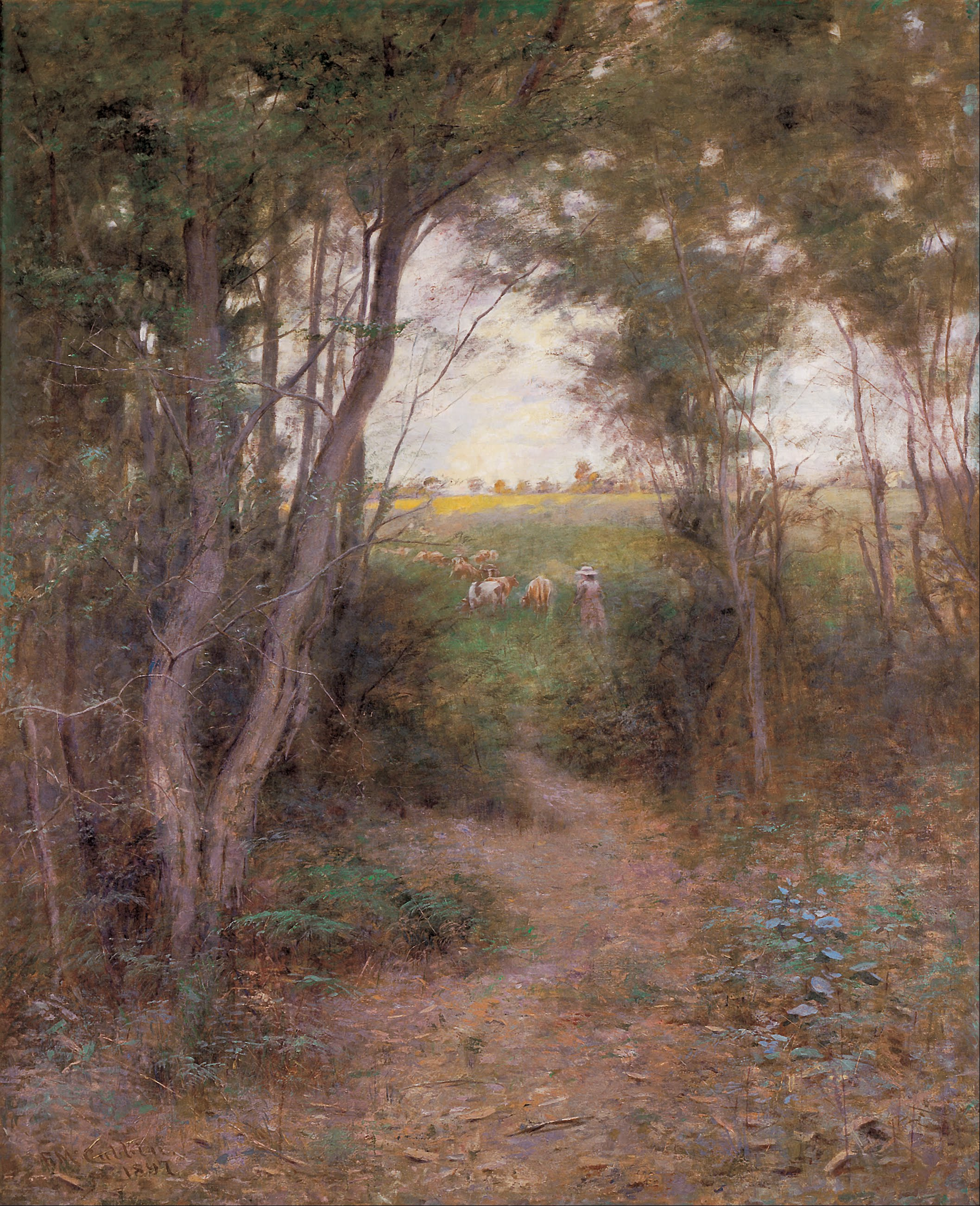
Frederick McCubbin, A ti-tree glade, 1897

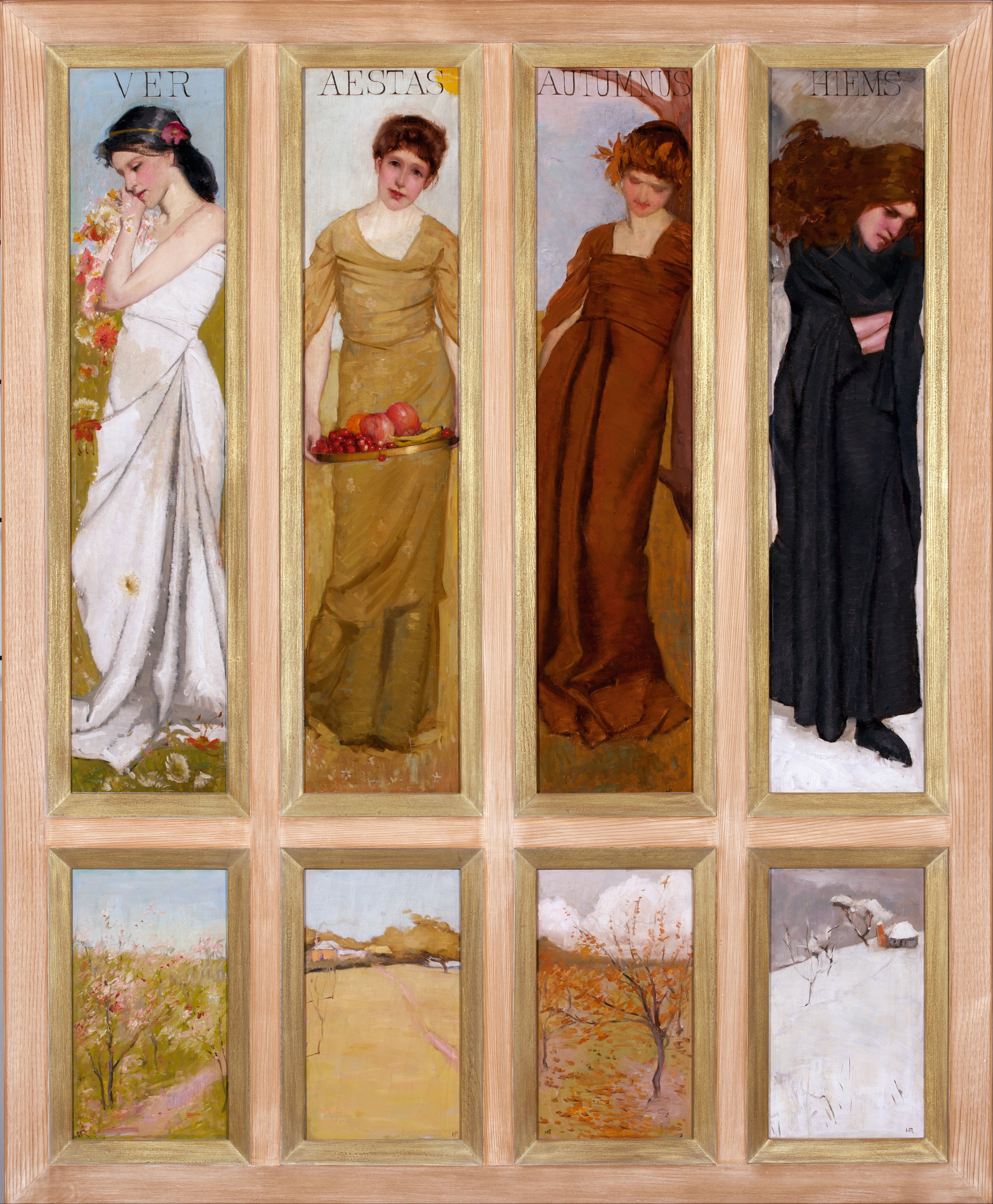
Hugh Ramsay, The four seasons, 1907

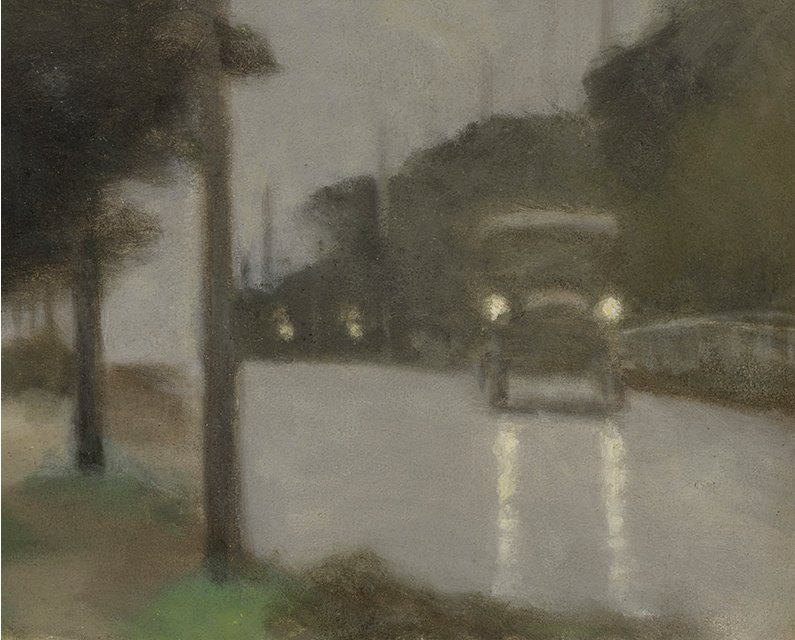
Clarice Beckett, Motor Lights, 1929

Selected international works

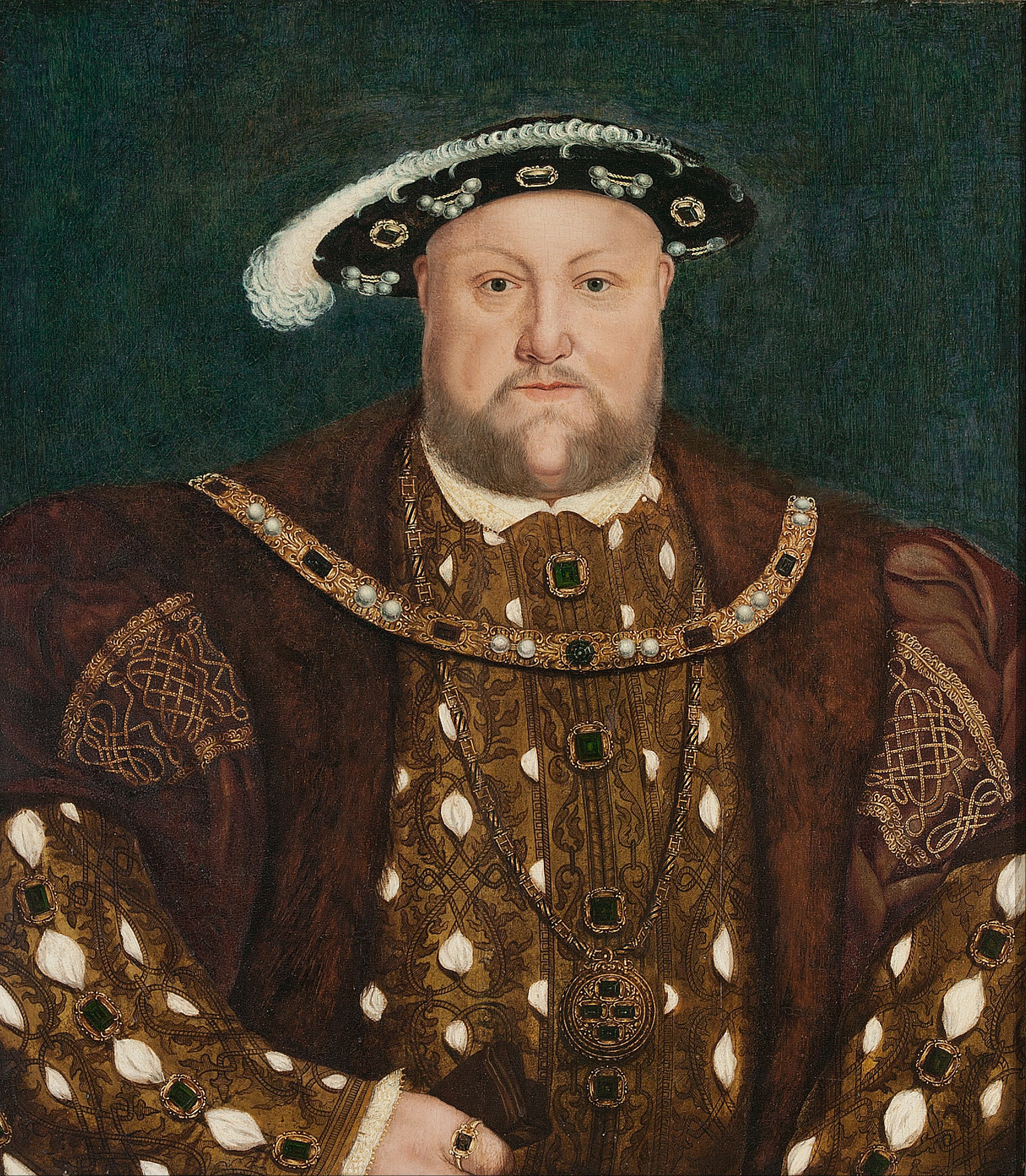
Hans Holbein the Younger (after), King Henry VIII, c. 1540

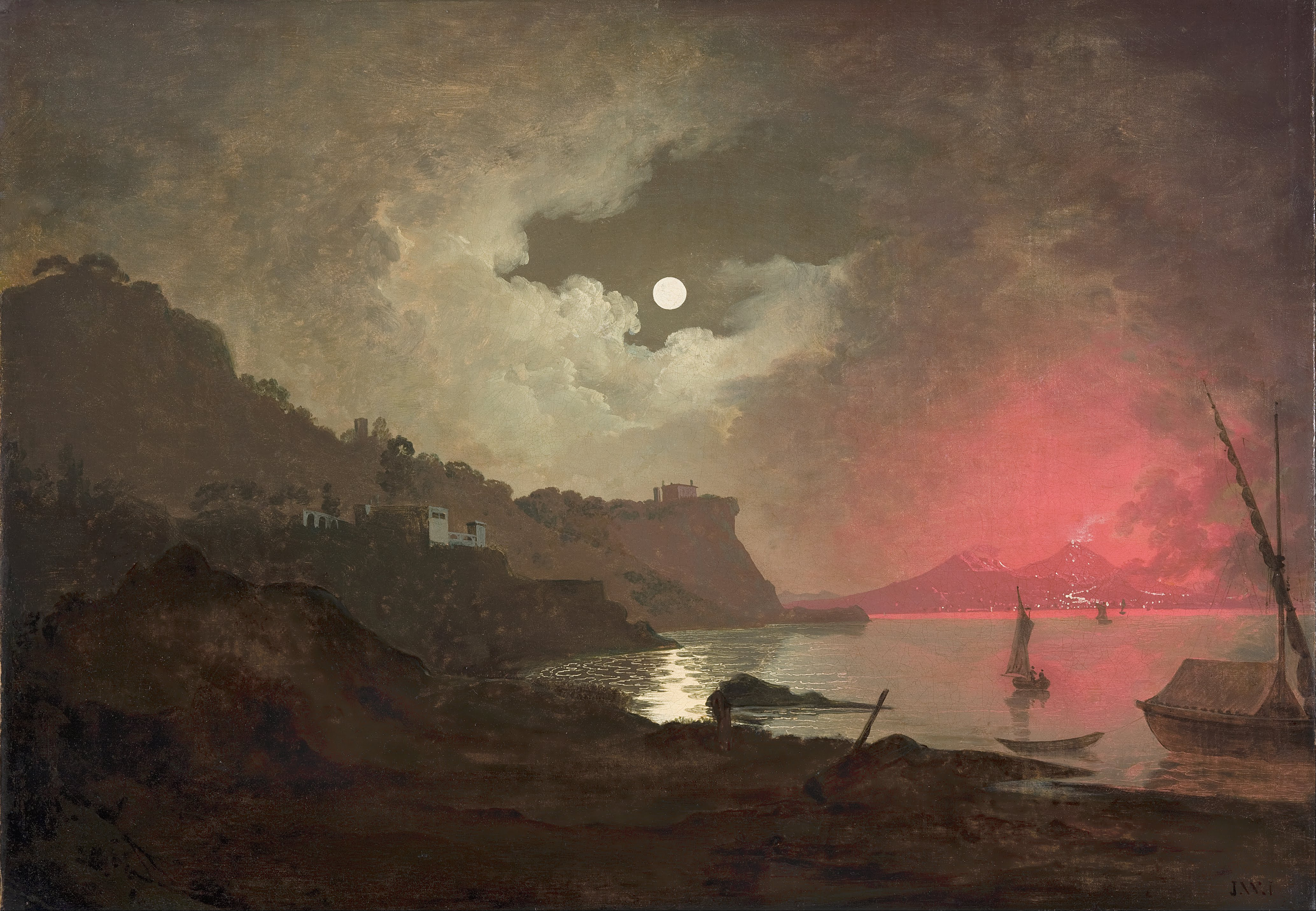
Joseph Wright of Derby, A view of Vesuvius from Posillipo, Naples, c. 1788

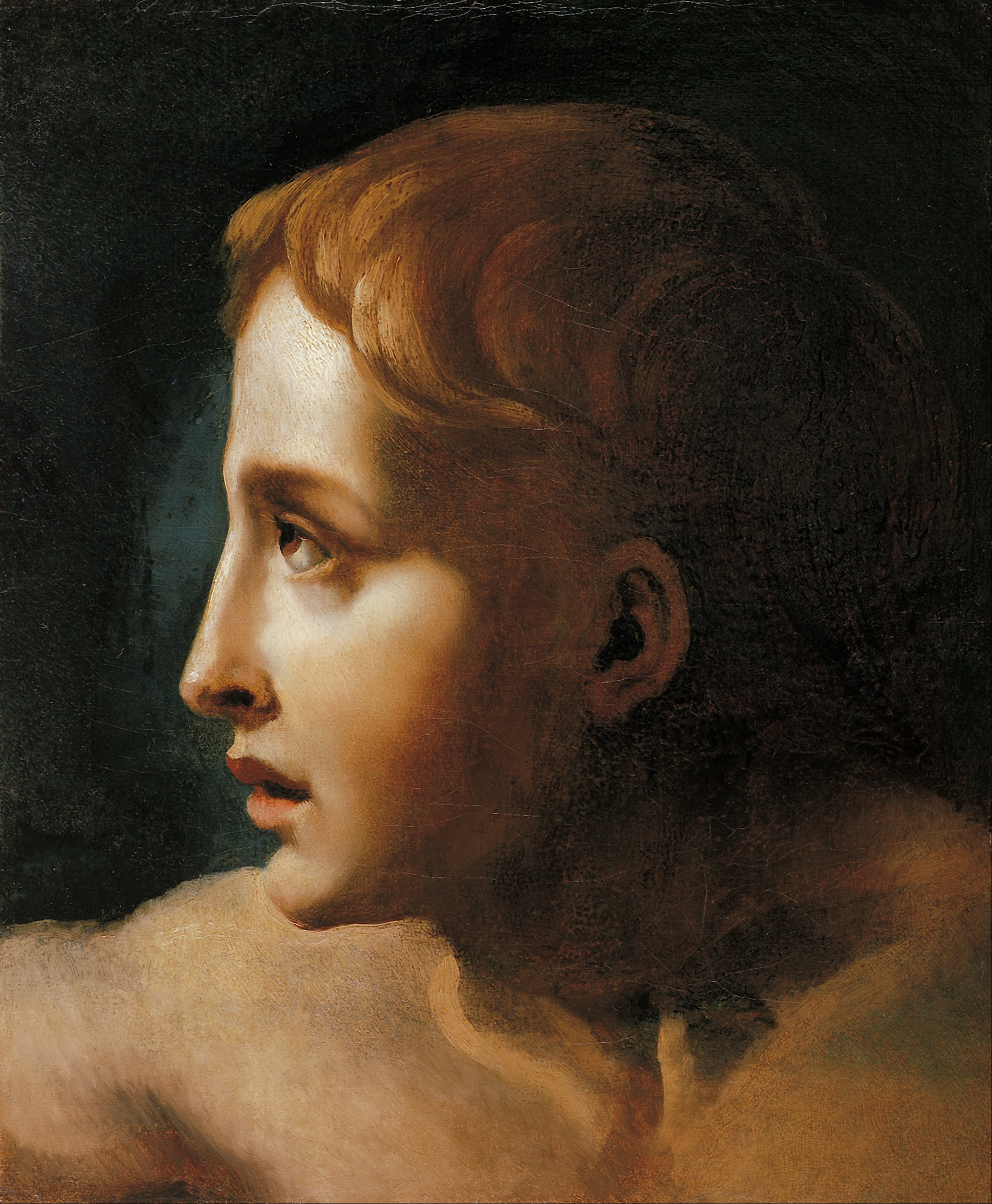
Théodore Gericault, Head of a Youth, c. 1821

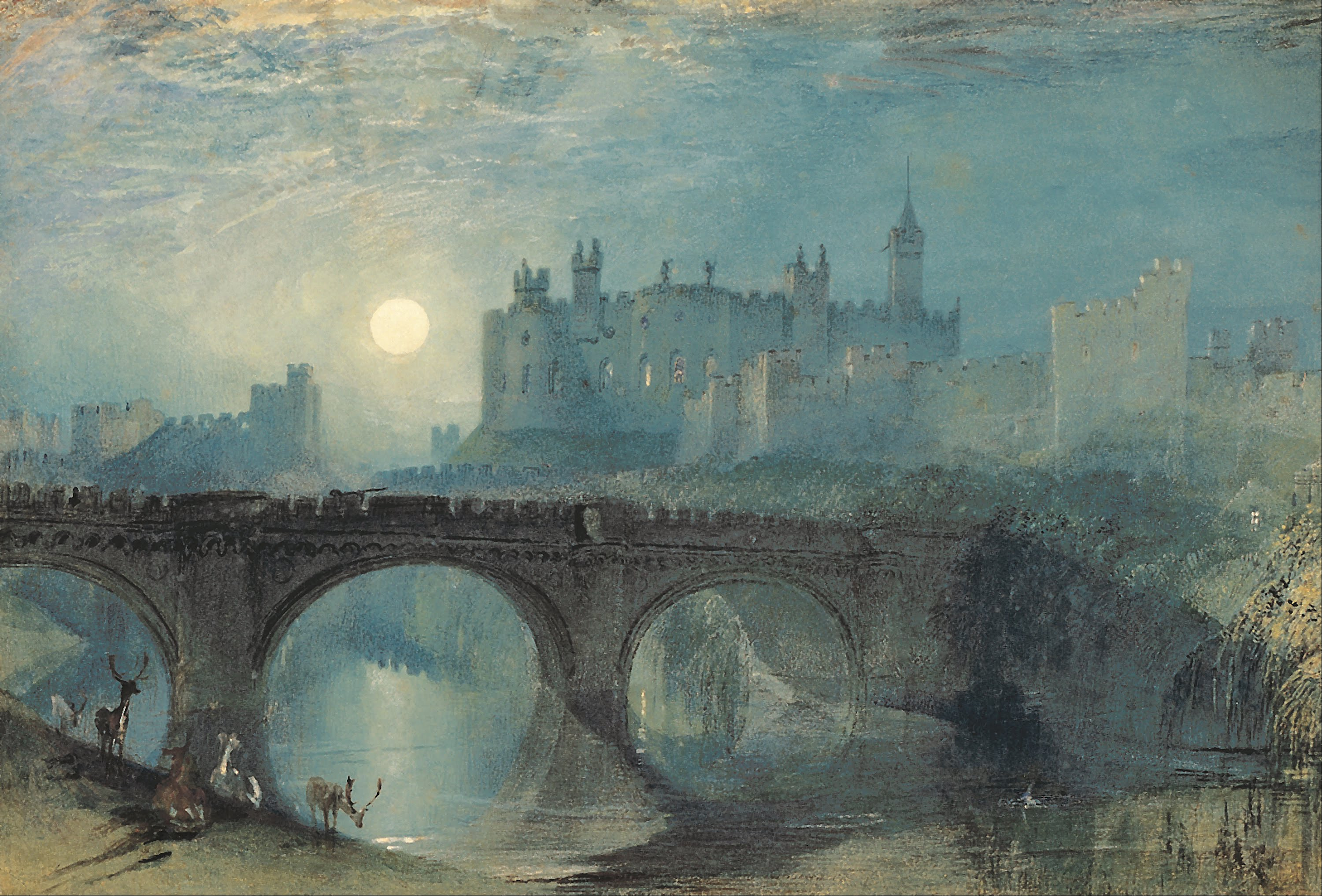
J. M. W. Turner, Alnwick Castle, 1829

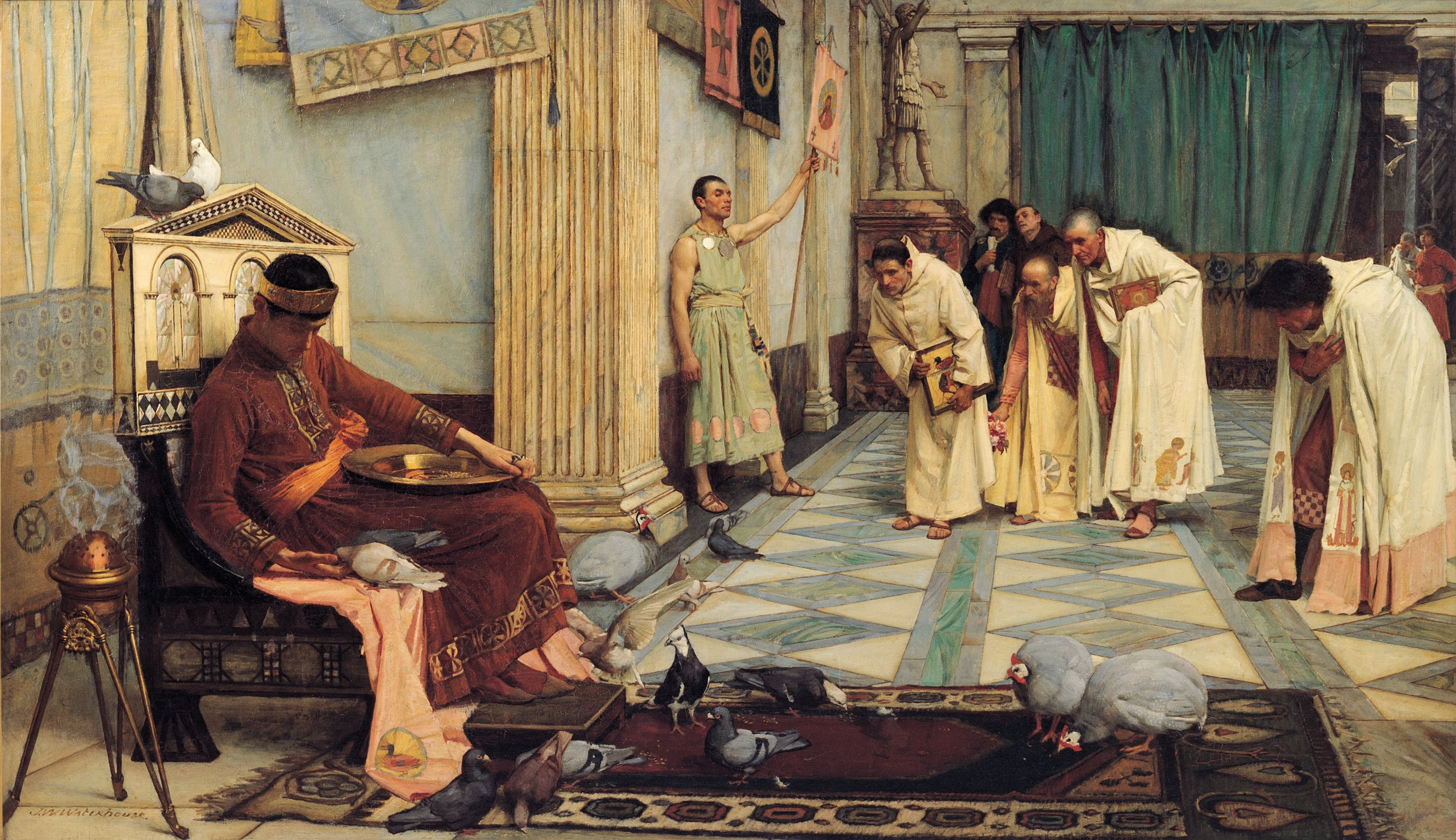
John William Waterhouse, The Favorites of the Emperor Honorius, 1883

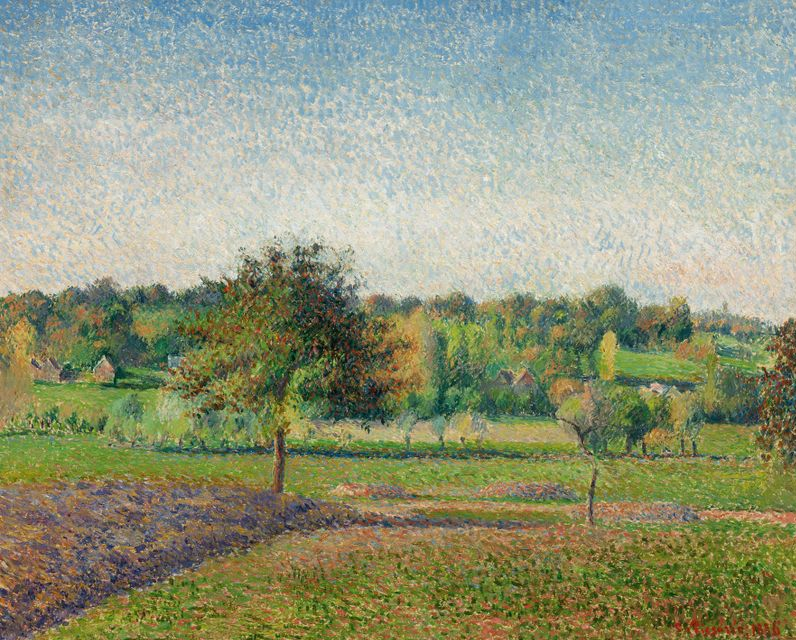
Camille Pissarro, Prairie à Éragny, 1886

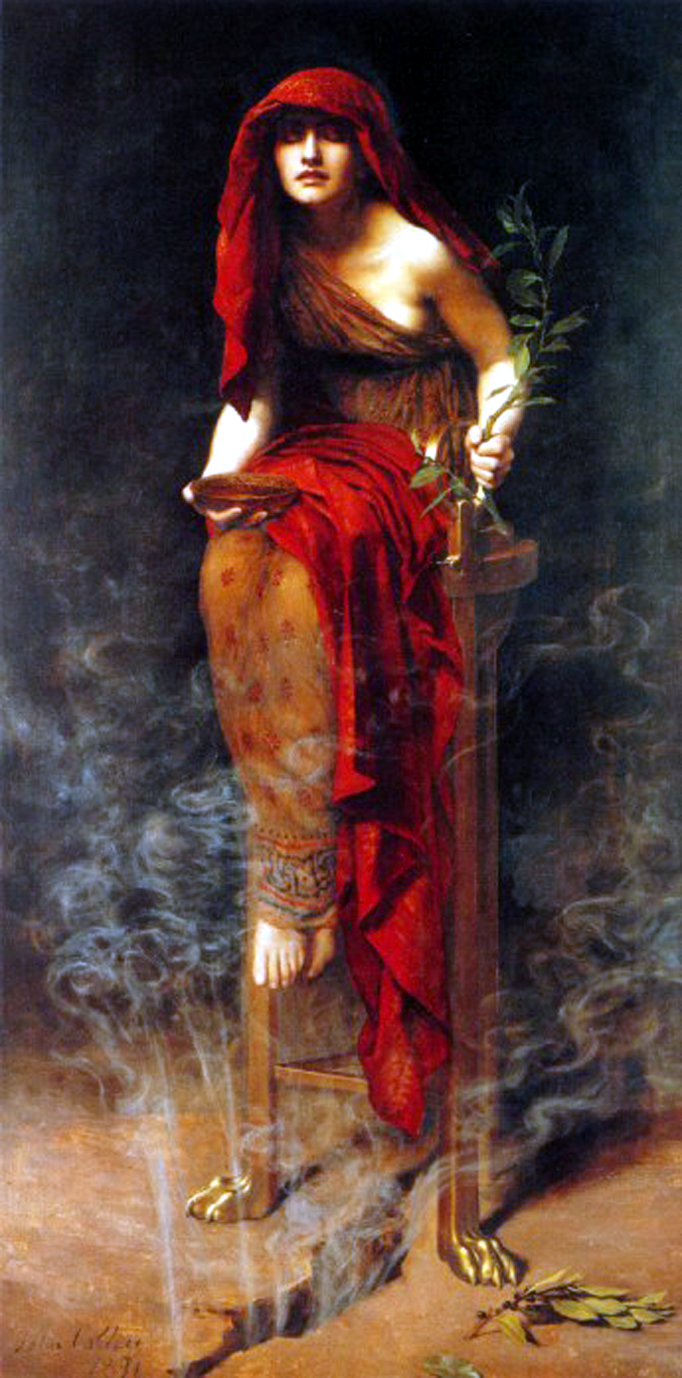
John Collier, Priestess of Delphi, 1891

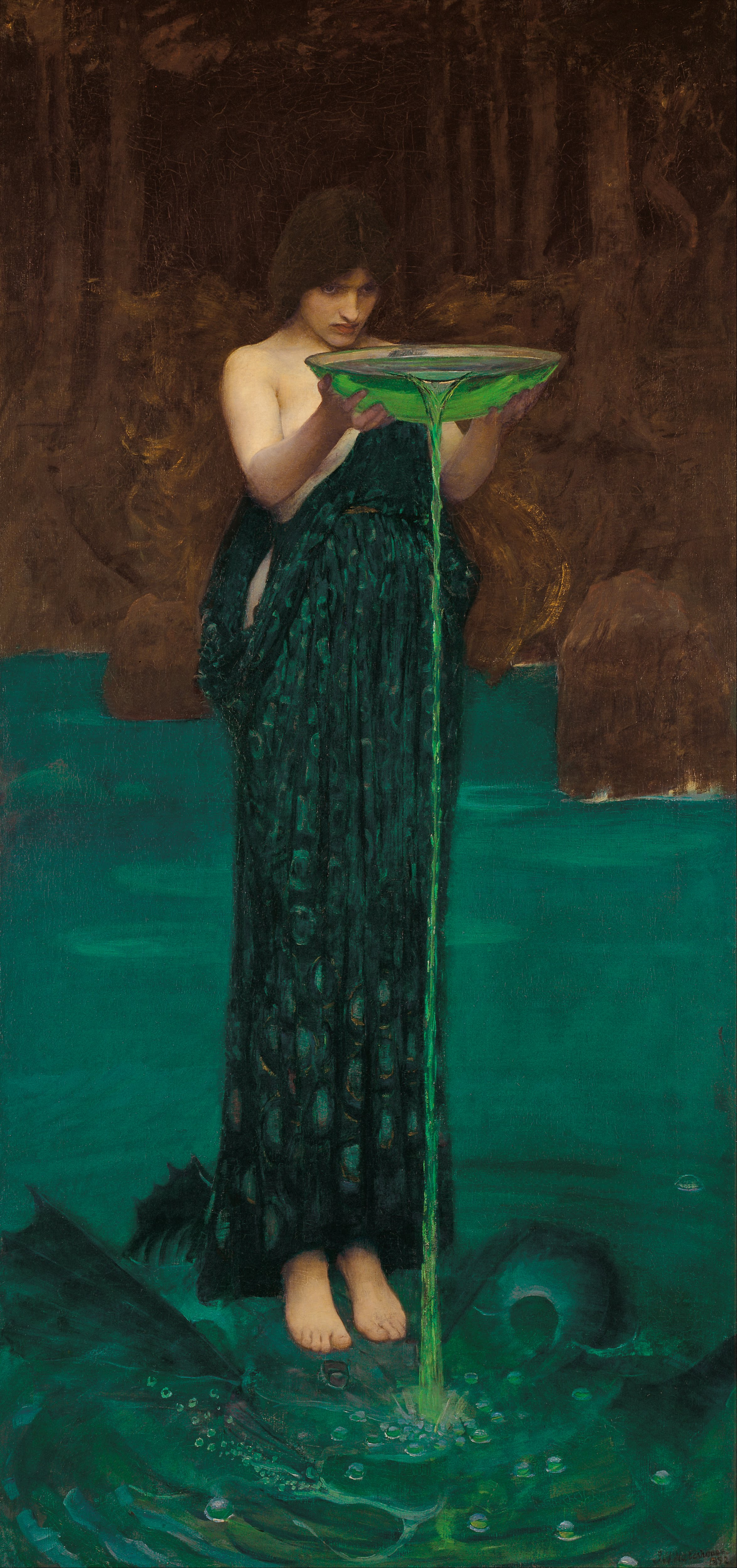
John William Waterhouse, Circe Invidiosa, 1892

== Tram stop ==
There is a stop outside the gallery on North Terrace, on the BTANIC line of the Glenelg tram line, that runs to the Adelaide Entertainment Centre.

| Preceding station | Adelaide Metro | Following station |
|---|---|---|
| Adelaide towards Adelaide Entertainment Centre | Glenelg tram line | University towards Botanic Gardens |

== See also ==
- South Australian Living Artists Festival (SALA)
- South Australian Museum
- State Library of South Australia
- National Gallery of Australia
- National Gallery of Victoria
- Queensland Art Gallery
- Art Gallery of New South Wales
- Art Gallery of Western Australia
- Tasmanian Museum and Art Gallery
