= Emma Browne =

Emma Browne may refer to:

- Emma Alice Browne (1835–1890), American poet
- Emma Ann Browne (1857–1941), British-born Australian philanthropist

== See also ==
- Emma Pallant-Browne (born 1989), British triathlete and former track and cross country runner
