= Kiwi (nickname) =

Demonym for New Zealanders

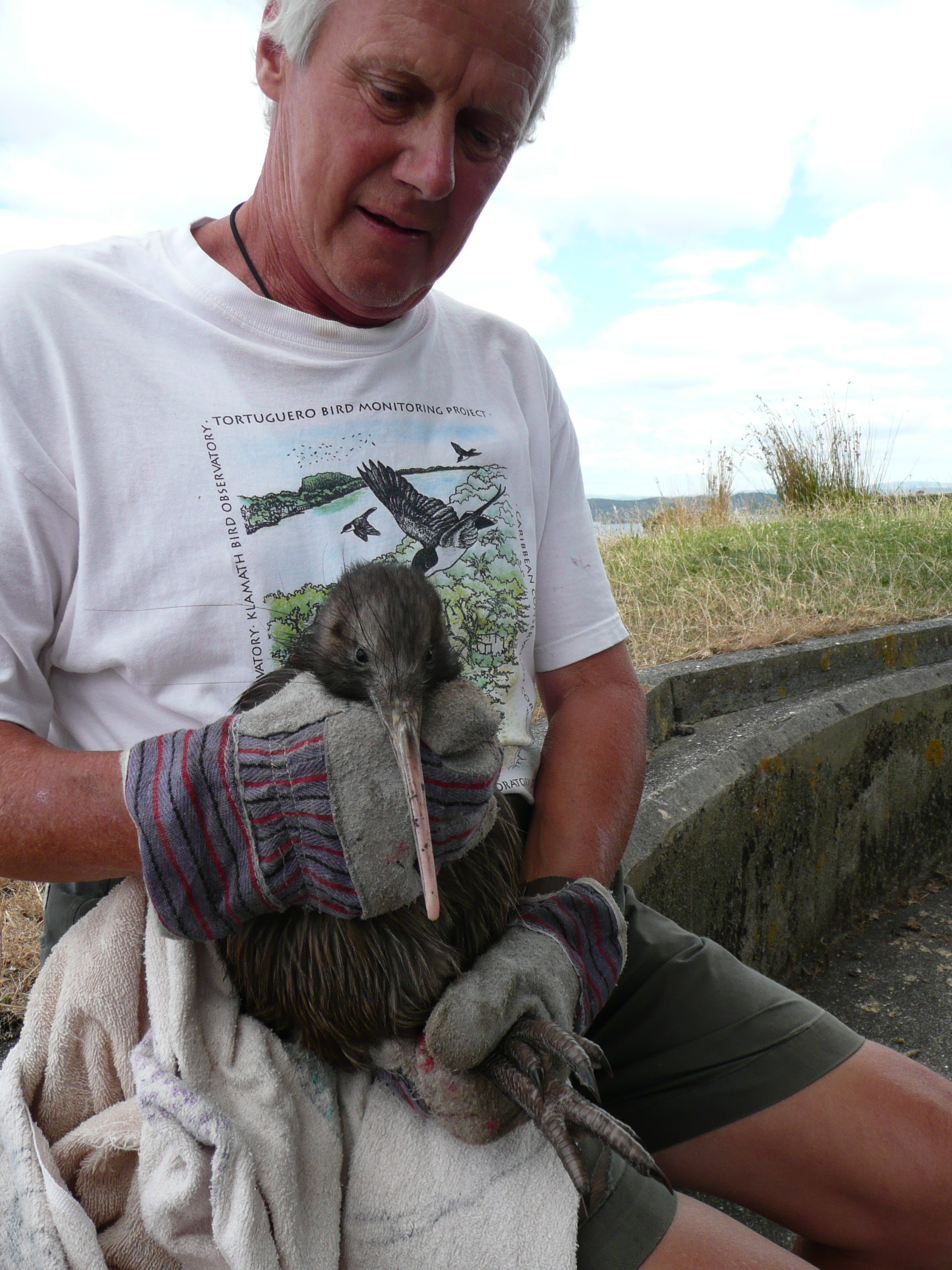
A Kiwi holding a kiwi

"Kiwi" (/ˈkiːwi/ KEE-wee) is a common self-reference used by New Zealanders, though it is also used internationally. The label is generally viewed as a symbol of pride and affection for most people of New Zealand, however there are New Zealanders, particularly some with Māori heritage, that find the appellation jarring and prefer not to identify with it.

The name derives from the kiwi, a native flightless bird, which is a national symbol of New Zealand. Until the First World War, the kiwi represented the country and not the people; however, by 1917, New Zealanders were also being called "Kiwis", supplanting other nicknames such as "Enzedder".

== History ==
The kiwi has long had a special significance for the indigenous Māori people, who used its skin and feathers to make feather cloaks (kahu kiwi) for chiefs. The bird first came to European attention in 1811 when a skin ended up in the hands of a British Museum zoologist, George Shaw, who classified it as a type of penguin and portrayed it as standing upright. After early sightings by Europeans the kiwi was regarded as a curiosity; in 1835 the missionary William Yate described it as "the most remarkable and curious bird in New Zealand".

=== Representing the country ===
In the early 1900s, cartoonists began to use the kiwi as a representation of New Zealand. For example, in a 1904 New Zealand Free Lance cartoon a plucky kiwi is shown growing to a moa after a rugby victory of 9–3 over a British team. The next year, The Westminster Gazette printed a cartoon of a kiwi and a kangaroo (representing Australia) going off to a colonial conference. Trevor Lloyd, who worked for The New Zealand Herald, also used a kiwi to represent the All Blacks rugby team, but he more often drew a moa. Other symbols for New Zealand at this time included the silver fern, a small boy, and a young lion cub. Until the First World War, the kiwi was used as a symbol of the country rather than the people of New Zealand.

=== Representing the people ===
Royal New Zealand Air Force (RNZAF) roundel, featuring a red kiwi in silhouette

In the early-20th century, New Zealanders, especially soldiers and All Blacks players, were referred to internationally as "En Zed(der)s" (derived from the initials of the country's name, N.Z.) or "Maorilanders" (in reference to the Māori people and their historical contribution to the country). These terms were still being used near the end of the First World War of 1914–18. However, although New Zealand soldiers were often described as "Diggers" or as "Pig Islanders", by 1917 they were also being called "Kiwis".

The image of the kiwi had appeared on military badges since the South Canterbury Battalion used it in 1886, and several regiments took it up in the First World War. "Kiwis" came to mean the men of New Zealand regiments. The nickname is not thought to have originated as a reference to the physical attributes of the New Zealand servicemen (i.e. implying they were short and stocky or nocturnal like the bird). It was simply that the kiwi was distinct and unique to the country. Its prominent use on the New Zealand regiments' insignia also made for easy association. The nickname eventually became common usage in all war theatres.

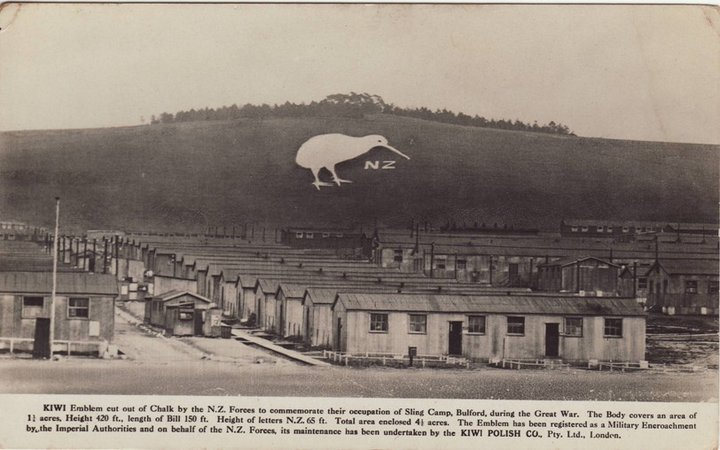
The Bulford Kiwi was created above the town of Bulford on the Salisbury Plain in Wiltshire, England in 1919.

After the end of the First World War in November 1918, many New Zealand troops stayed in Europe for months or years awaiting transport home. At Sling Camp, near Bulford on Salisbury Plain in Wiltshire, New Zealand soldiers carved a chalk kiwi into the nearby hill in early 1919. The New Zealanders' presence popularised the nickname within Europe.

A can of Kiwi shoe polish

An Australian boot polish called Kiwi was widely used in the imperial forces. William Ramsay, a developer of the product, named the polish in honour of his wife's birthplace, New Zealand. Beginning in 1906, Kiwi Shoe Polish eventually became widely sold in the UK and the US, and the symbol became more widely known. The Australian National Dictionary also gives the first use of the term "Kiwi Kids" and "Kiwis" in 1917, to mean Australian army recruits who had kiwied up; in other words, they had highly polished boots.

Following the Second World War of 1939–1945 the term gradually became attributed to all New Zealanders, and today throughout the world they are referred to as Kiwis, as well as often referring to themselves that way.

== Current usage ==
Spelling of the word Kiwi, when used as a nickname for the people, is often capitalised. The bird's name is spelled with a lower-case k and, being a word of Māori origin, normally stays as kiwi when pluralised. As an English word, the nickname normally takes the plural form Kiwis. Thus, "two Kiwis" refers to two people, whereas "two kiwi" refers to two birds. This linguistic nicety is exemplified by the conservation trust Save the Kiwi, which used the slogan "Kiwis for kiwi". In 2020, Kiwibank shifted to using the plural form Kiwi (capitalised but without the terminal -s) to refer to the people, most prominently changing its slogan from "Kiwis making Kiwis better off" to "Kiwi making Kiwi better off".

Kiwi is not generally considered to be a derogatory term, but there are New Zealanders, particularly some with Māori heritage, who find the appellation jarring and prefer not to identify with it. In 2018, a South Australian employment tribunal ruled that the nickname was not discriminatory, after a New Zealander unsuccessfully argued that she was a victim of racial discrimination after being labelled a "Kiwi".

In an official context, the term kiwi has been used in the name of government services and state-owned enterprises, such as Kiwibank, KiwiSaver, and KiwiRail, and is frequently used in government press releases to refer to everyone in or of New Zealand. In August 2022, Minister of Immigration Michael Wood referred to 85,000 holders of recently approved New Zealand 2021 resident visas as "new Kiwis".

== See also ==
- Bloke
- Kiwiana, items or icons particular to New Zealand
- Kiwifruit, fruit associated with New Zealand, but not native to it, which is also known as the "Chinese Gooseberry"
- Māori, the indigenous Polynesian people of New Zealand
- Pākehā, non-Māori (especially European) New Zealanders
- .kiwi, an internet top-level domain
- Yankee
- Canuck
- Aussie
