= John Ramsay (businessman) =

Scottish-born Australian businessman (1841–1924)

- Born: 1841; Forth, Lanarkshire, Scotland
- Died: 3 March 1924 (aged 82–83); Essendon, Melbourne, Victoria, Australia
- Occupations: Realtor; lay preacher
- Known for: Chairman of Kiwi shoe polish (1916–1924)
- Spouse(s): Margaret, née Thomson (m. 1867)
- Children: William Ramsay; Hugh Ramsay; Sir John Ramsay; and six others

John Ramsay (1841–1924) was a Scottish-born Australian businessman, today best remembered as the father of manufacturer William Ramsay, artist Hugh Ramsay, and surgeon Sir John Ramsay.

Ramsay was born in Forth, Lanarkshire. In his early life he worked as a book-seller, jeweller, and die-sinker and engraver. He married Margaret Thompson, and had four children in Glasgow. In 1878 he headed for Melbourne, Victoria, eventually settling in Prahran. After settling in Australia, the Ramsays raised a further five children.

After his son William finished his schooling, John and William set up a real estate firm, John Ramsay & Son. The firm was successful, owing in part to a real estate boom at the time, and in 1888, Ramsay built the family a "Clydebank", a mansion in Essendon, named after the Scottish town. After the boom ended, Ramsay worked as a valuer for the city councils of Melbourne and Essendon, and the State Savings Bank of Victoria.

When William's Kiwi shoe polish began to take off in Australia, Ramsay travelled to England to promote the brand in the United Kingdom, establishing a branch of Kiwi Polish Co. in London. Following William's death in 1914, and the subsequent amalgamation of the British and Australian branches of the company (as "Kiwi Polish Co Pty Ltd") in 1916, Ramsay acted as Chairman of directors until his death on 3 March 1924, at Clydebank.

Ramsay was a deeply religious man, and acted as a lay preacher in the Congregational church. He also taught a Bible class at the YMCA.
