= Jason Smith (curator) =

Australian art curator and gallery director

Jason Smith is an Australian art curator and gallery director. He has been director of the Art Gallery of South Australia since February 2025, making the move from Geelong Gallery, where he had been director for around eight years.

== Early life and education ==
Jason Smith studied a four-year undergraduate degree at the Canberra School of Art (now the ANU School of Art and Design), studying art history and majoring in printmaking and graduating in 1987. Many lessons were held at the recently opened National Gallery of Australia, with educators and curators there, which had an impact on his future career.

He moved to Melbourne in early 1988, starting his career with "a brief stint at an uninspiring private gallery", before completing a postgraduate program in museum studies at Deakin University in 1992. In 1993 he was selected to participate in a project run by 200 Gertrude Street called "Raw Material: Young Curators' Program", which introduced four aspiring curators to making exhibitions in a variety of spaces.

== Career ==
Smith applied for a position as Assistant Curator for the NGV Access Gallery, but instead won a role as senior curatorial assistant in the Directorate of the National Gallery of Victoria. In this role he worked with James Mollison and then his successor Timothy Potts, before being appointed Curator, Contemporary Art, in 1997.

He was appointed director of the Monash Gallery of Art in 2007, his leadership role continuing at Heide Museum of Modern Art, where he was director and CEO from 2008 to 2014.

Smith held the position of curatorial manager of Australian art at Queensland Art Gallery & Gallery of Modern Art (QAGOMA) before moving back to Victoria to become director of Geelong Gallery in 2016.

In February 2025 he began his term as director of the Art Gallery of South Australia (AGSA). As of September 2026 Smith remains director of AGSA.

== Other activities and roles ==
Smith became a member of the board of the Public Galleries Association of Victoria in 2020 and its president in July 2024.

He has been a judge of several art prizes, including the Wyndham Art Prize and Geelong Acquisitive Print and Ursula Hoff Institute Awards in 2023. He was chief judge in the 2025 Brisbane Portrait Prize in March 2025.

He has written extensively on works by over 150 artists for a variety of publications.

== Recognition and awards ==
Under his direction, Geelong Gallery won awards in Business Excellence for Corporate Social Responsibility and Inclusive and Accessible Business, and Cultural Tourism awards at state and national levels.
