= Sarah Contos =

Australian artist

Sarah Contos is an Australian artist known for her collages and installations. She has been a finalist in a number of art prizes, and was the inaugural recipient of the $100,000 Ramsay Art Prize at the Art Gallery of South Australia.

== Education ==
In 1998 Contos completed a Diploma of Fine Arts in Art, Design and Multimedia at the Central Metropolitan College of TAFE in Perth, Western Australia.

In 2004, she completed a Bachelor of Design for Performance at Western Australian Academy of Performing Arts and worked as a theatre costume and set designer.

She completed a Masters of Art (Painting) at the College of Fine Arts (now UNSW Art & Design), University of New South Wales.

== Career and practice ==
Contos' artworks incorporate textiles, screen printing, found objects, and painting in a practice best described as collage, sculpture and installation-focused.

In 2009, Contos moved to Sydney to pursue her career as an artist.

In 2015, she gained representation with gallerist Roslyn Oxley.

In 2018 Contos completed a residency at Cité Internationale des Arts in Paris and presented an installation for the Balnaves Contemporary Series at the National Gallery of Australia called Nikola Tesla Sends Theda Bara to Mars.

In 2019, Contos was one of four artists who created site-specific installations for the Sofitel Darling Harbour for Sydney Contemporary.

Contos explores identity, eroticism, femininity, materiality, popular culture and history. She describes her life in relation to contradictions, saying: “I make quilts for art but never for warmth. I watch cooking shows but never cook. I want to cover my home in florals, but it ends up in wine stained sequins”.

Contos' practice is studio-based. Australian artist and curator Daniel Mudie Cunningham reflected on a studio visit with the artist by saying, "Imagine a happy-sad catastrophe of colour and movement; an inviting lair where tactile sculptural forms appear embalmed in recycled teenage tears".

== Recognition ==
In 2011, she was among six recipients of the Marten Bequest scholarship.

In 2013, she was a finalist in the John Fries Award and one of three inaugural recipients of the 4A Beijing Study Program, alongside Tully Arnot and Jensen Tjhung.

In 2014, her work Personification of Past and Future Mythologies (Double-Headed Barry) was included in the Redlands Konica Minolta Art Prize.

In 2017, Contos won the inaugural $100,000 Ramsay Art Prize at the Art Gallery of South Australia with her work Long Kiss Goodbye.

== Collections ==
- Campbelltown City Council collection
- National Gallery of Australia
- Art Gallery of South Australia
- Heide Museum of Modern Art
