= Hugh Ramsay =

Australian artist (1877–1906)

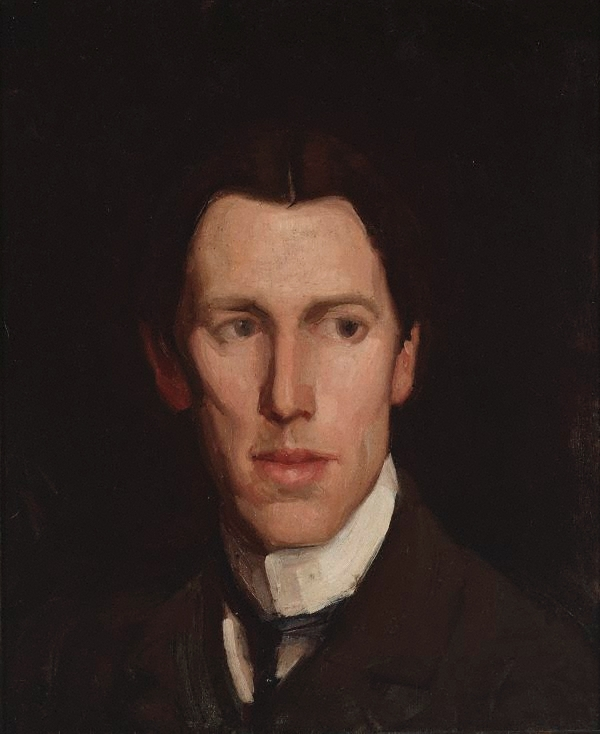
Hugh Ramsay (1902) by George Washington Lambert

Hugh Ramsay (25 May 1877 – 5 March 1906) was an Australian artist.

== Early life and education ==
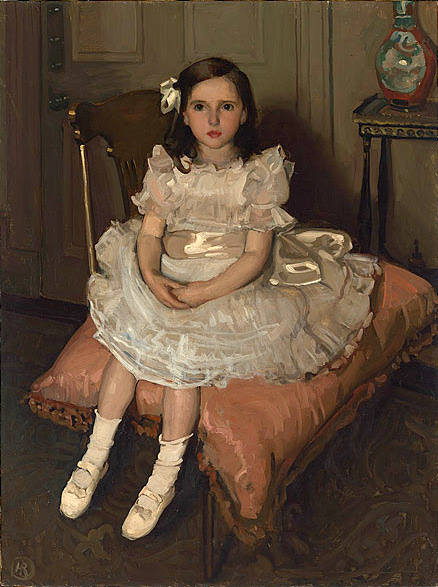
Miss Nellie Patterson (1903), daughter of Ambrose Patterson, niece of Nellie Melba

Ramsay was born in Glasgow, Scotland, on 25 May 1877, the son of John Ramsay. He moved with his family to Melbourne in 1878. He was educated at Essendon Grammar School, and joined classes at the National Gallery of Victoria at age 16 under Lindsay Bernard Hall.

== Career ==
Ramsay went to Europe in September 1900 and was fortunate in finding a kindred spirit, George Washington Lambert, on the same vessel – the SS Persic. Arriving at Paris, he entered Académie Colarossi and was soon recognised as a student of great potential. He sent five pictures to the 1902 exhibition of the Société Nationale des Beaux-Arts and four of these were accepted and hung together. No greater compliment could have been paid to a young student.

Among his portrait sitters was Nellie Melba, then at the height of her fame. Ramsay became seriously ill with tuberculosis and was advised to return to the warmer climate of Australia. He made small preparatory paintings but was unable to complete the planned full length portrait of Melba.

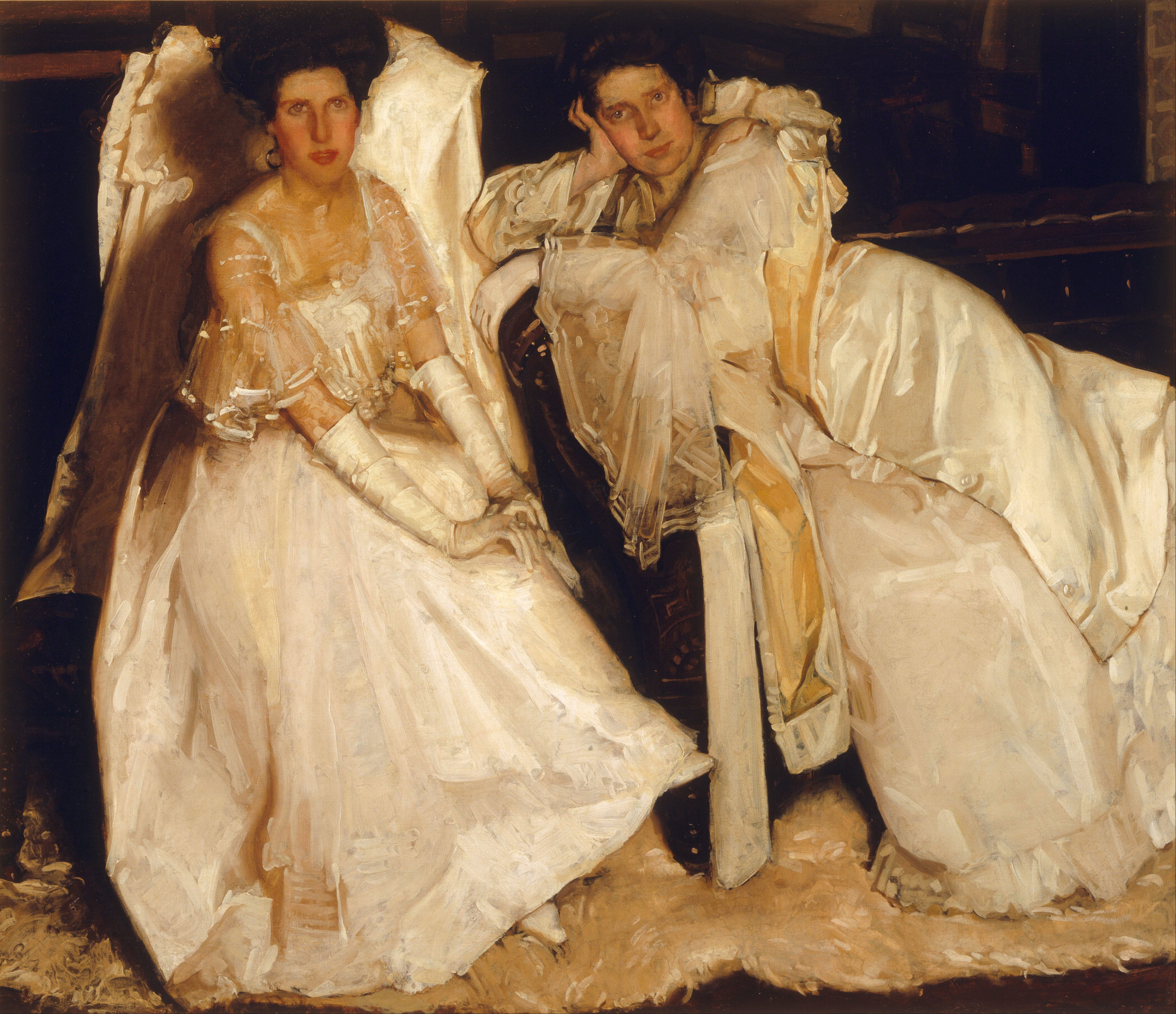
The Sisters (1904)

Returning to Australia, Ramsay worked on The Sisters (a portrait of his own sisters, 1904; Art Gallery of New South Wales, Sydney), Lady with a Fan (possibly his most famous painting), the portrait of David Scott Mitchell, and his own portrait, now in the National Gallery of Victoria, Melbourne. He gradually became weaker and died at “Clydebank” Buckley Street, Essendon on 5 March 1906 a few weeks before completing his twenty-ninth year. He was buried in St Kilda Cemetery.

== Family ==
Hugh Ramsay was brother to surgeon John Ramsay and William Ramsay, founder of Kiwi boot polish. His nephew, James, co-founded with his wife Diana the James and Diana Ramsay Foundation, responsible for one of the biggest bequests every made to an art gallery in Australia and funding the Ramsay Art Prize at the Art Gallery of South Australia.
