= John Ramsay (surgeon) =

Australian surgeon (1872–1944)

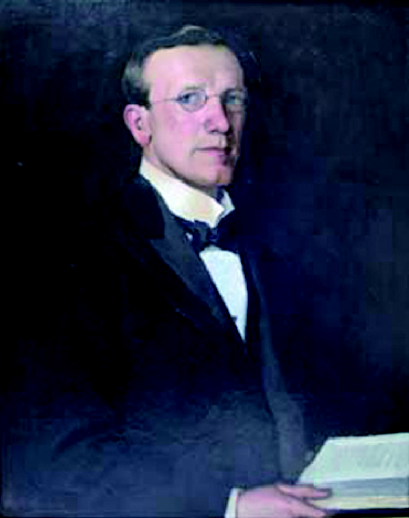
A portrait of Sir John Ramsay, painted towards the end of his life.

Sir John Ramsay CBE FRACS (26 December 1872 – 6 February 1944) was an Australian surgeon, known for his association with the Launceston General Hospital.

== Early life and education ==
Born in Glasgow, Scotland, on 26 December 1872, John Ramsay was the fourth son of the businessman John Ramsay and his wife, Margaret Thomson. The family migrated to Melbourne in 1878, where John Jr Ramsay attended State School No. 2855 at Prahran and Wesley College. He graduated as a Bachelor of Medicine and Surgery (M.B., B.S.) from the University of Melbourne with the Beaney Prize in pathology, in 1893.

== Career ==
After a year's residency at the Royal Melbourne Hospital (1894), Ramsay spent the next year abroad in Auckland as a resident (1895), before being appointed house surgeon at the Launceston General Hospital. In 1896, Ramsay and Dr. Francis John Drake participated in the first demonstration of X-rays by Frank Styant Browne at Launceston General Hospital. In 1898, he became the surgeon-superintendent of the hospital. Graduating with a Master of Surgery degree from the University of Melbourne in 1902, Ramsay published 24 papers, including a discussion of his treatment of hydatid disease, as well as lecturing in Australia and overseas.

In 1906, Ramsay performed a successful resuscitation of the heart by massage, opening the thorax of a patient who had clinically died during operation; becoming the first surgeon in Australasia to perform a successful resuscitation. Designing and building St. Margaret's Hospital in Launceston, Ramsay entered private practice in 1912 upon the hospital's foundation. However, he retained his connection with the Launceston General Hospital, serving as an honorary consulting surgeon for the hospital. Interested in the works of Wilhelm Röntgen in regards to the potential of deep x-ray therapy, Ramsay had permanent scarring on his hands and face as a result of experiments with x-ray. In 1919, he visited (Germany) to purchase x-ray equipment from Siemens.

During World War I, Ramsay served, with the rank of major, as a surgeon in the Hornsey Military Hospital in Launceston, later the 12th Australian General Hospital. For his military services, Ramsay was appointed Commander of the Order of the British Empire in 1924. The following year in 1925, Ramsay became president of the Tasmanian branch of the British Medical Association. In 1927, Ramsay became a foundation fellow of the Royal Australasian College of Surgeons. Joining the board of directors of the Launceston General Hospital in 1929, Ramsay became chairman in 1933 until his death in 1944. Associated with the Medical Council of Tasmania and the Red Cross, Ramsay was also a director of his brother William's company, Kiwi Polish.

== Cricket ==
Ramsay was also a keen cricketer, and whilst resident in Launceston played a single first-class match for Tasmania. In the match, against Victoria at the Melbourne Cricket Ground in January 1898, he recorded a pair, failing to score in either innings.

== Recognition ==
For his services to surgery, Ramsay was knighted in 1939 in the New Year Honours; he became the first Launcestonian and the first medical practitioner in Tasmania to be knighted.

== Death and legacy ==
He died in Launceston on 6 February 1944, and was cremated. The "Sir John Ramsay Memorial Library" at the General Hospital was dedicated in his memory.

== Family ==
John Ramsay was brother to William Ramsay, founder of Kiwi boot polish, and artist Hugh Ramsay. His son, James, co-founded with his wife Diana the James and Diana Ramsay Foundation, responsible for one of the biggest bequests every made to an art gallery in Australia and funding the Ramsay Art Prize at the Art Gallery of South Australia.

== See also ==
- Health care in Australia
- List of Tasmanian representative cricketers
