= John Ramsay (footballer, born 1896) =

Scottish footballer

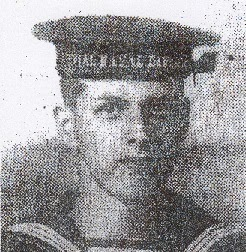

Personal information
- Full name: John Bryce Ramsay
- Date of birth: 1 September 1896
- Place of birth: Grangemouth, Scotland
- Date of death: 28 April 1917 (aged 20)
- Place of death: near Arras, France
- Height: 5 ft 8 1/2 in (1.74 m)
- Position: Inside right

Senior career*
Years	Team	Apps	(Gls)
–1914	Grange Rovers		
1914–1915	Falkirk	25	(10)
- * Club domestic league appearances and goals

John Bryce Ramsay (1 September 1896 – 28 April 1917) was a Scottish professional footballer who played in the Scottish League for Falkirk as an inside right.

== Personal life ==
Ramsay worked as a boat builder. On 25 May 1915, nine months after the outbreak of the First World War, he enlisted in the 63rd (Royal Naval) Division. Rising to the rank of able seaman, he saw action at Gallipoli and on the Western Front. Ramsay was killed near Arras, France on 29 April 1917 and is commemorated on the Arras Memorial. His younger brother Alexander was killed in November 1916.

== Honours ==
Falkirk

- Falkirk Infirmary Shield: 1914–15
