= John Michael Ramsey =

American analytical chemist

- Born: Mansfield, Ohio
- Citizenship: United States of America
- Education: Bowling Green State University (B.S. 1974); Indiana University (Ph.D. 1979)
- Scientific career
- Fields: Microfabricated chemical instrumentation, microfluidics, nanofluidics
- Workplaces: University of North Carolina at Chapel Hill, Department of Chemistry
- Thesis: New Approaches for the Measurement of Subnanosecond Chemical Phenomena (1979)
- Doctoral advisor: Dr. Gary M. Hieftje
- Website: www.chem.unc.edu/people/faculty/ramsey/group/index.html

John Michael Ramsey is an American analytical chemist at the University of North Carolina at Chapel Hill. He currently holds the position of Minnie N. Goldby Distinguished Professor of Chemistry. His current research with the university focuses on microscale and nanoscale devices such as microchip electrospray, microscale Ion trap mass spectrometers, and microfluidic point of care devices. He is ranked #1 in the "Giants of Nano" field and #1 in the "Inventors" field on The Analytical Scientist Power List.

== Career ==
=== Early research ===
Michael Ramsey attended Bowling Green State University for his undergraduate studies where he obtained his Bachelor of Science in Chemistry with dual minors in Physics and Mathematics in June 1974.

He then went on to obtain his Doctor of Philosophy in Analytical chemistry from Indiana University Bloomington in January 1979. Dr. Ramsey conducted his research under the direction of Gary M. Hieftje from 1974 to 1979 culminating in his published dissertation "New Approaches for the Measurement of Subnanosecond Chemical Phenomena" .

=== Current research ===
The Ramsey Group at the University of Chapel Hill is interested in utilizing micro- and nano fabrication strategies to create devices that facilitate people's ability to gather chemical and biochemical information. Their motivations for fabricating devices include clinical diagnostics, high-throughput biochemical experimentation, understanding of transport mechanisms in nanoscale-confined spaces, and development of portable mass spectrometers operating at high-pressures (>1 Torr).

Applications for the devices that they develop include drug discovery, health care, environmental monitoring, chemical process control, and high-throughput laboratory analysis and basic research.

The four main areas of active research in the Ramsey group include:

1. Microchip electrospray
2. Microfluidic point of care
3. Microscale Ion Trap MS
4. Nanofluidics

=== Industry ===
He is a founding scientist and current director of 908 Devices incorporated, a company which focuses on building handheld mass spectrometry devices for applications in laboratory analysis, safety and security, as well as for use in the life sciences. In 2017 908 Devices Inc. received the Federal Laboratory Consortium Excellence in Technology Transfer Award. The company is known for several products, including the zipchip ™ separations platform for quick and high quality separation and mass spectrometry analysis of biological samples and the M908 ™ handheld High Pressure Mass Spectrometry tool for analysis of chemical warfare agents. Dr. Ramsey is also a founding scientist and former scientific advisory board member of Caliper Technologies incorporated, later renamed Caliper Life Sciences, a company that commercializes microfluidics and lab-on-a-chip technologies. Caliper Life Sciences was acquired by PerkinElmer in 2011 for $650M.

Between 1979 and 2004, Ramsey worked as a Eugene P. Wigner Fellow, research associate, and eventually a group leader for Oak Ridge National Laboratory.

== Awards/memberships ==
Awards that Ramsey has received include the Ralph N. Adams Award in Bioanalytical Chemistry (2013), the CASSS Award for Outstanding Achievements in Separation Science (2012), the American Chemical Society Award in Chromatography (2007), the Pittsburgh Analytical Chemistry Award (2006), the ACS Division of Analytical Chemistry Award in Chemical Instrumentation (2003), the Battelle Distinguished Inventor Award (2003), and the Frederick Conference Capillary Electrophoresis Award (2000).

Ramsey holds professional memberships with National Academy of Engineering, the American Chemical Society, and the Analytical Division of the American Chemical Society.

He has 108 issues patents, 2 allowed patents, and 20 pending patents.
