= Emma Ann Browne =

Australian philanthropist

- Born: Emma Ann Elmes; February 24, 1857; Wareham, Dorset, England
- Died: October 24, 1941 (aged 84); Launceston, Tasmania, Australia
- Education: private school
- Known for: philanthropy
- Spouse: Frank Styant Browne
- Children: seven

Emma Ann Browne, née Elmes (February 24, 1857 – October 24, 1941), was a British-born Australian philanthropist.

== Life ==
Browne was born in 1857 in Wareham. Her parents were Matilda (born Warland) and John Clifford Elmes who as a coachbuilder. She was educated at a private school.

On 18 June 1882, she married Frank Styant Browne in Wimborne, Dorset at the parish church.

Emma Browne was a philanthropist. The Diamond Jubilee of Queen Victoria was celebrated throughout the British empire in 1897. In Tasmania a public meeting was held to determine how the occasion might be marked. The second wife of the governor of Tasmania, Georgina Jane Connellan, Lady Gormanston suggested that a maternity hospital would be a great addition. At the time the only assistance to pregnant women came from untrained and unregulated midwives. It was agreed and Brown joined the committee of women to manage the new facility that opened on 195 St John Street in September 1897.

The National Council of Women of Australia was not formed until 1931. Browne was an active member long before that as she was in the Tasmanian branch which formed in 1899. She rose to be President of that branch.

The couple had six sons and a daughter who survived them even though four of her sons were soldiers in the First World War. Browne was a lifelong resident of Launceston, Tasmania. Her husband died on 17 April 1938 at their home.

Browne died in Launceston on 24 October 1941. Their children were Clifford Styant-Browne of Melbourne; Alderman F. Warland-Browne, Deputy Mayor of Launceston; Arthur S. Browne, of Sydney; Harry W. Browne, of Sydney; Horace S. Browne of Perth, W.A.; Noel R. Browne, of Launceston, Kathleen Browne, of Launceston and Noel Richardson Brown who was wounded in 1916,
