= Frank Styant Browne =

Australian pharmacist and photographer

Frank Styant Browne (10 July 1854 – 17 April 1938), also known as Styant Browne, was an Australian pharmacist, artist, photographer and X-ray pioneer from Tasmania.

In Australia, the medical men of the day took a slow approach in the adoption of the new science that involved X-rays. Many of the early demonstrations were made by investigators outside the medical field. Upon examination of the initial investigators, several key factors were common. The individuals had already either been experimenting along similar lines to Wilhelm Röntgen with Crookes tubes and such, the physicists or scientists, or were actively associated with electrical work, the electricians, which made them particularly receptive to the technical appeal of the new science of X-rays. Records of the events reveal that among the medical men who witnessed the first images produced as radiographs, a rather small number had any great desire to employ X-rays directly in their own medical practice.

After the early investigative work of Thomas Ranken Lyle, William Henry Bragg, Joseph Patrick Slattery, and others, almost all medical men were satisfied with soliciting the services of the external X-ray man when necessity arose for skiagraphs to be produced. As the utilization of X-rays became more acceptable, the involvement of electricians began to decline. As the hospitals started to be equipped with X-ray apparatus and installations under the care of radiologists and radiographers, the medical men began to accept the eventuality of the new technology. Up to this point, the private experimenters and investigators continued to be the initiators of new ideas for the medical profession in this new field.

== Personal life ==
Browne was born in 1854 in the old cathedral city of Norwich, Norfolk, England, the son of George Browne, bookseller, and Ann, née Styant. On 18 June 1882, he married Emma Ann Elmes at Wimborne, Dorset, in the parish church. Browne was from the Newport parish at Isle of Wight. Ms. Elmes was from the parish of record, Wimborne, Dorset. His wife, Emma Ann Browne, (1857–1941) was a philanthropist. She was educated at a private school. The couple had six sons and one daughter. Browne was a lifelong resident of Launceston, Tasmania. He died on 17 April 1938 at his home on David street.

He left a widow and a family of six sons and one daughter: Clifford Styant-Browne of Melbourne; Alderman F. Warland-Browne, Deputy Mayor of Launceston; Arthur S. Browne, of Sydney; Harry W. Browne, of Sydney; Horace S. Browne of Perth, W.A.; Noel R. Browne, of Launceston, and Miss Kathleen Browne, of Launceston.

== Education ==
Browne was educated at King Edward VI School in Norwich, and Derby Grammar School. He studied pharmacy in Norwich, where he was apprenticed to chemists, and gained further experience in Hastings, Reigate, and London. In London, he studied chemistry at the Westminster College of Pharmacy and passed his examinations. In the 1870s, he studied art at the Derby School of Art. In November 1882, Browne and his bride arrived at Hobart, Tasmania.

== F. S. Browne and Company ==
In 1882, Browne became a registered chemist in Tasmania. In 1882, Browne first worked with fellow dispensing chemist or pharmacist Henry Thomas Gould, at Harry Benjafield’s Homœopathic Pharmacy at Elizabeth-street in Hobart. Browne knew Gould from London, as they were friends and classmates at the Westminster College of Pharmacy. In October 1883, Browne became manager and dispensing chemist for Benjafield’s Homœopathic Pharmacy on Elizabeth-street at Launceston, Tasmania. The business moved to Brisbane-street in August 1884. In September 1885, he purchased the pharmacy from Benjafield and renamed the business F. S. Browne and Company. Later the business moved to Fergusons Block on Brisbane Street. From 1887 until he retired in 1932, the pharmacy was located at 112 Brisbane Street in Launceston.

== Professional service ==
- Pharmacy Board of Tasmania, member
- Pharmaceutical Society of Tasmania, president; member; examiner in botany
- Launceston Improvement Association, member; raised £8000 to beautify Cataract Gorge
- Launceston Art Society, judge; member
- Launceston Homeoepathic Hospital, honorary secretary
- Art Society of Tasmania, president
- Northern Tasmanian Camera Club, president; honorary secretary
- Northern Tasmanian Tourist Association, member
- Launceston, justice of the peace

== Awards and honors ==
- France-British Exhibition, silver medal for colour photographs
- Pioneer in Australia for three-colour photography

== Photography ==
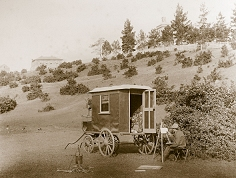
Voyages in a Caravan Frank Styant Browne

On 24 July 1889, the Northern Tasmanian Camera Club was formed at a meeting held at Frank Styant Browne’s pharmacy, the F. S. Browne Homoeopathic Pharmacy. The group limited its membership to amateurs, but promoted high technical and artistic standards. The Club, as of January 2016, was still active. The Club’s objective: "promote and advance photographic excellence through ... lectures, demonstrations, field trips, tutorials, workshops, and encourage participation in all levels and standards of photographic competitions and exhibitions". Browne was associated with Joshua Higgs. In the summer of 1896 and the autumn of 1899 the pair traveled around Tasmania on two separate holidays and captured the Tasmanian countryside in photographs. These travels were published in Voyages in a Caravan.

=== Select works ===
- Voyages in a Caravan – 1896 or 1899.
- On the Edge of the Moor – landscape class, medal awarded; Photographic Society Exhibition, 1903.
- Peaceful Eventide – Photographic Society Exhibition, 1903.

== Artwork ==
Frank Styant Browne was known by other names in the artistic and photographic circles, including: Frank Styant-Browne, Artist (Photographer), Artist (Painter), also known as F. Styant Browne, Frank Styant Browne, F. S. B. The Queen Victoria Museum and Art Gallery, Launceston, holds a collection of Styant Browne's work. In 1885, Browne conducted an art union with Joshua Higgs at Launceston.

=== Select works ===
- HMS Nelson – was won by William Costain
- Bears – oil on terra cotta
- Horses – oil on terra cotta
- The Shipwreck
- A Close Show
- Berean – oil painting
- At the Mercy of the Waves – oil painting
- S.S. Pateena – oil painting
- Christmas Day in the Bush – watercolour on card
- Road to Panshanger - oil painting, 1925

== Exhibitions ==
Frank Styant Browne was known by other names in the artistic and photographic circles, including: Frank Styant-Browne, Artist (Photographer), Artist (Painter), also known as F. Styant Browne, Frank Styant Browne, F. S. B.

- Dunning, the Launceston drapers’ shop, Launceston, Tasmania; 1884
- Howard Haywood's Tasmanian Exhibition, Longford, Tasmania; Launceston, Tasmania; 1885
- Melbourne Centennial International Exhibition, Exhibition Building, Melbourne, Victoria; 1888-1889
- Homoeopathic Pharmacy, Launceston, Tasmania; 1888
