= John Ramsay (magician) =

- Born: John Ramsay; 13 March 1877; Ayr, Scotland
- Died: 19 January 1962 (aged 84); Ayr, Scotland
- Occupations: Grocer, Amateur magician
- Known for: Magic

John Ramsay (13 March 1877 – 19 January 1962) was a Scottish magician. He has been described, by Alex Proctor, former President of the Scottish Conjurers' Association, as a "magician's magician, who loved to trick fellow conjurers".

Ramsay performed at the International Brotherhood of Magicians (IBM) convention in Batavia, New York and Chicago, in 1950. In 1955, he won the micromagic category at the Fédération Internationale des Sociétés Magiques (FISM), held in Amsterdam. He also served as president of the British Ring of the IBM. John Ramsay is the only magician in the world with a garden named after him; Ramsay Gardens, in his native town of Ayr, Scotland.

== Published works ==
- John Ramsay's Routine For Cups and Balls. Victor Farelli (1948)
- John Ramsay's Cylinder and Coins. Victor Farelli (1948)
- The Triple Restoration. Victor Farelli (1949)
- Four Little Beans (a Comedy Trick). John Ramsay & Victor Farelli (1952)
- The Ramsay Legend by Andrew Galloway (1969)
- The Ramsay Episode one by Andrew Galloway (1971)
- The Ramsay Classics by Andrew Galloway (1977)
- The Ramsay Finale by Andrew Galloway (1982)
- Ramsay Legend Revised by Andrew Galloway (1985)

== See also ==
- List of magicians
- Card magic
- Coin magic
