= William Ramsay (manufacturer) =

Australian shoe polish manufacturer (1868–1914)

- Born: 6 June 1868; Glasgow, Scotland
- Died: 4 September 1914 (aged 46); Melbourne, Victoria, Australia
- Occupation(s): Inventor, manufacturer, businessman
- Relatives: Sir John Ramsay (brother), Hugh Ramsay (brother), Robin Ramsay (grandson)

William Ramsay (6 June 1868 – 4 September 1914) was a Scottish-born Australian shoe polish manufacturer. In 1906, Ramsay developed "Kiwi" brand shoe polish, today one of the most famous shoe polish brands in the world.

== Biography ==
Ramsay was born on 6 June 1868 in Glasgow, Scotland to Margaret Thomson and her husband, businessman John Ramsay. The family migrated to Melbourne in June 1878. The family prospered in Victoria; Ramsay's father, John, was a die-sinker and engraver in Scotland, however he became a successful real estate broker in his adopted homeland. After he left school, Ramsay set up a successful real estate firm with his father.

After a trip to New Zealand, where he met and married Annie Elizabeth Meek in Oamaru on 2 January 1901, Ramsay established a factory in Carlton in partnership with Hamilton McKellar. From there, Ramsay & McKellar produced disinfectants, polishes, creams, and other products.

In 1904 the factory moved to Elizabeth Street, Melbourne. In 1906, they began producing a new shoe polish under the trademark "Kiwi". The polish, which would become successful in Australia within a few years, was named in honour of Annie Ramsay's New Zealand heritage. In 1912, after McKellar had left the company, Ramsay's father established a branch of Kiwi Polish Co. in London. In 1913 Ramsay visited Europe to promote the brand.

Ramsay died of cancer on 4 September 1914 in the family home at Essendon, in Melbourne. He was survived by his wife, Annie, and their two sons. His father died on 3 March 1924.

== Family in the business ==
Ramsay's wife Annie took over as Chair of Kiwi from 1924 to 1933.

His elder son John (1904-1966) joined the company in 1921, became Managing Director in 1928, and later Chairman.

His younger son, Sir Thomas Meek Ramsay (b.1907) graduated in science at the University of Melbourne and joined the company as consulting chemist in 1926. In 1956 became Managing Director. He married Alice James, and their son is actor Robin Ramsay, whom he disowned.

== Other family ==
Two of Ramsay's brothers went on to achieve notability: Sir John Ramsay as a surgeon and cricketer, and Hugh Ramsay as an artist. It was largely William's wealth that helped to fund a large art bequest created by John's son James.
