= Kiwi (shoe polish) =

Shoe polish brand

- Current owner: S. C. Johnson & Son
- Introduced: 1906; 120 years ago Australia
- Previous owners: Sara Lee Corporation
- Website: kiwicare.com

Kiwi is a global brand of shoe polish, originally developed in Australia in 1906 by William Ramsay. Kiwi grew to be the dominant shoe polish in many countries because it was used by both the British and U.S. Armies in World War I. However, the brand announced its exit from the UK market in 2022. In 2023, Kiwi said it would be ending the brand in the US by June 2024, phasing out some products before the end of 2023.

As of 2025, the Kiwi brand is owned by S. C. Johnson.

== History ==
The polish was originally made by an Australian company, which first marketed the product in 1906. William Ramsay and fellow Scottish expatriate in Australia, Hamilton McKellar, began making boot polish and other products in a small factory in Melbourne in 1904. While a number of older leather preserving products existed, including the Irish brand "Punch", which was first made in 1851, and the German brand, "Erdal", which went on sale in 1901, Kiwi's introduction in 1906 made it the first shoe polish to resemble modern varieties, aimed primarily at inducing shine. Ramsay and McKellar launched an improved formula, marketing it in Melbourne as "Kiwi Boot Polish". Ramsay loaded boxes of the product on to his horse and cart and sold it to farmers to protect their boots. Ramsay named it "Kiwi" after the flightless bird native to New Zealand, the home country of his wife, Annie Elizabeth Meek.

Kiwi was a major improvement on previous brands. It preserved shoe leather, made it shine, and restored colour. By the time Kiwi Dark Tan was released in 1908, it incorporated agents that added suppleness and water resistance. Australian-made boot polish was then considered the world's best. A range of colours became available, and exports began to Britain, continental Europe, and New Zealand.

A rival brand at the time was "Cobra Boot Polish", based in Sydney. Cobra was noted for a series of cartoon advertisements in The Sydney Bulletin, starting in 1909, using a character called "Chunder Loo of Akim Foo". (The Australian slang word chunder, meaning "to vomit", possibly originated through the rhyming slang of Chunder Loo and spew.)

Its success in Australia was matched overseas after it was adopted by both the British and United States armies in World War I.

The spread of Kiwi shoe polish around the world enhanced the popular appeal of the kiwi as New Zealand's national symbol.

== Corporate history ==
Can of Kiwi shoe polish in 2005

=== Australian ownership ===
Over the years, Kiwi has been owned by a variety of corporations. For the first six decades of its existence, it was one of the iterations of an Australian corporation with Kiwi in its name, all based in the state of Victoria, including Kiwi Boot Polish Co. (1913–1916) and Kiwi Polish Co. (1916–1971). The company then joined with Nicholas International Ltd., a Melbourne-based pharmaceutical company producing international brands such as Aspro and Rennie. The new company was renamed Nicholas Kiwi.

=== Manufacture in the UK ===
In the UK, Kiwi polish was manufactured for many years at the company's British headquarters in Ealing. That facility manufactured for the UK market and exported the Kiwi brand to much of Europe and the Middle East. In the mid-1970s, as part of a major streamlining, the UK factory was closed, and production was switched to France. The UK operation moved to Yateley becoming, effectively, a sales and marketing office, with distribution contracted to a third party.

In 1980, production for the UK market moved back to the UK, and was housed in a factory near Huddersfield. The UK head office was relocated to Maidstone, in Kent, where Kiwi had other product interests. Following a global merger with Nicholas Laboratories, the UK head office was again relocated to Slough, at the Nicholas building on the Bath Road.

=== Sara Lee (1984–2011) ===
In 1984, it was acquired by American-based Consolidated Foods Corporation (later the Sara Lee Corporation), which eventually sold the Nicholas pharmaceutical products range to Roche of Switzerland, but kept the Kiwi range.

In 1991, a subsidiary of the Sara Lee Corporation (Sara Lee) acquired part of the shoe care business of Reckitt & Colman, including the Cherry Blossom and Meltonian brands. Sara Lee already owned the Kiwi brand, among others.

The U.S. Federal Trade Commission ruled that Sara Lee had to divest its ownership of those companies in 1994, to prevent it from becoming a monopoly. Since then, Sara Lee has been prevented from acquiring any further assets or firms associated with chemical shoe care products in the United States without prior commission approval. The Competition Commission in the United Kingdom also investigated the potential monopoly of Sara Lee in the shoe care industry.

As of 2005, Kiwi polish was manufactured in Australia, Canada, Honduras, France, India, Indonesia, Pakistan, Peru, South Africa, Spain, the United Kingdom, and the United States.

=== S. C. Johnson (April 2011–present) ===
On 4 April 2011, Sara Lee announced that it had completed its sale of its global shoe care business, in a majority of countries, to S. C. Johnson.

== Market share ==
Kiwi has been the dominant shoe polish in many countries, including the United Kingdom and the United States for much of its life. As of 2013 Kiwi remained the predominant shoe polish brand in most of the world, being sold in over 180 countries and holding a 53% market share worldwide. In Malaysia and Singapore, Kiwi has become such a household name for shoe polish that the word "kiwi" has been genericised into a verb in the Malay language, meaning "to polish one's shoes".

In December 2022, S. C. Johnson announced that it had exited the UK shoe care market, blaming the effect of changes in work patterns caused by the COVID-19 pandemic in the United Kingdom, and the rise of casual shoes that do not require polishing.

== See also ==
- List of oldest companies in Australia
- Kiwi (people)
