= Nick Mitzevich =

Australian art curator (born 1970)

Director of the National Gallery of Australia
- Incumbent
- Assumed office 2 July 2018
- Preceded by: Gerard Vaughan

Director of the Art Gallery of South Australia
- In office July 2010 – April 2018
- Preceded by: Christopher Menz
- Succeeded by: Rhana Devenport

Director of the University of Queensland Art Museum
- In office 2007–2010
- Preceded by: Ross Searle
- Succeeded by: Campbell B Gray

Director of the Newcastle Art Gallery
- In office 2001–2007
- Preceded by: Gil Docking
- Succeeded by: Ron Ramsey

Personal details
- Born: 1970 (age 55–56) New South Wales, Australia
- Education: University of Newcastle
- Occupation: Art curator, art museum director

Nick Mitzevich (born 1970) is the director of the National Gallery of Australia (NGA) in Canberra, a position he has occupied since July 2018. From 2010 until his appointment to the NGA in April 2018, he was director of the Art Gallery of South Australia in Adelaide.

== Early life and education ==
Nick Mitzevich was born in 1970. He is the son of Chrisoula, of Greek heritage, and Macedonian father Nick Mitzevich. Nick Jr is the eldest and only son, with three younger sisters, who all grew up on their parents' small farm at Abermain, outside Cessnock, in the Hunter Valley of New South Wales. He says that his parents insisted that their children "do something for a worthy cause", but also "let us follow our passions". He was a shy, introverted child. He has said that his early years as a "farmer's apprentice" to his parents helped to shape his life.

His parents had no connection to art, but two things led the young Nick Mitzevich to his current occupation: his mother bought him a copy of Robert Hughes' book of his television series The Shock of the New when he was 15; and a few years later, a school excursion took him to a large exhibition at the Art Gallery of New South Wales, called Gold of the Pharaohs, that made a big impression on him.

He first studied art practice, exhibiting work at Newcastle Art Gallery in 1993, but switched to studying art history and art education. Watching and listening to Betty Churcher working as a tour guide at the National Gallery of Australia (NGA) when on a university excursion further inspired him.

He earned a Bachelor of Arts in Visual Arts (1992), and graduate diplomas in visual arts (1993) and education (1995) from the University of Newcastle, north of Sydney.

== Career ==
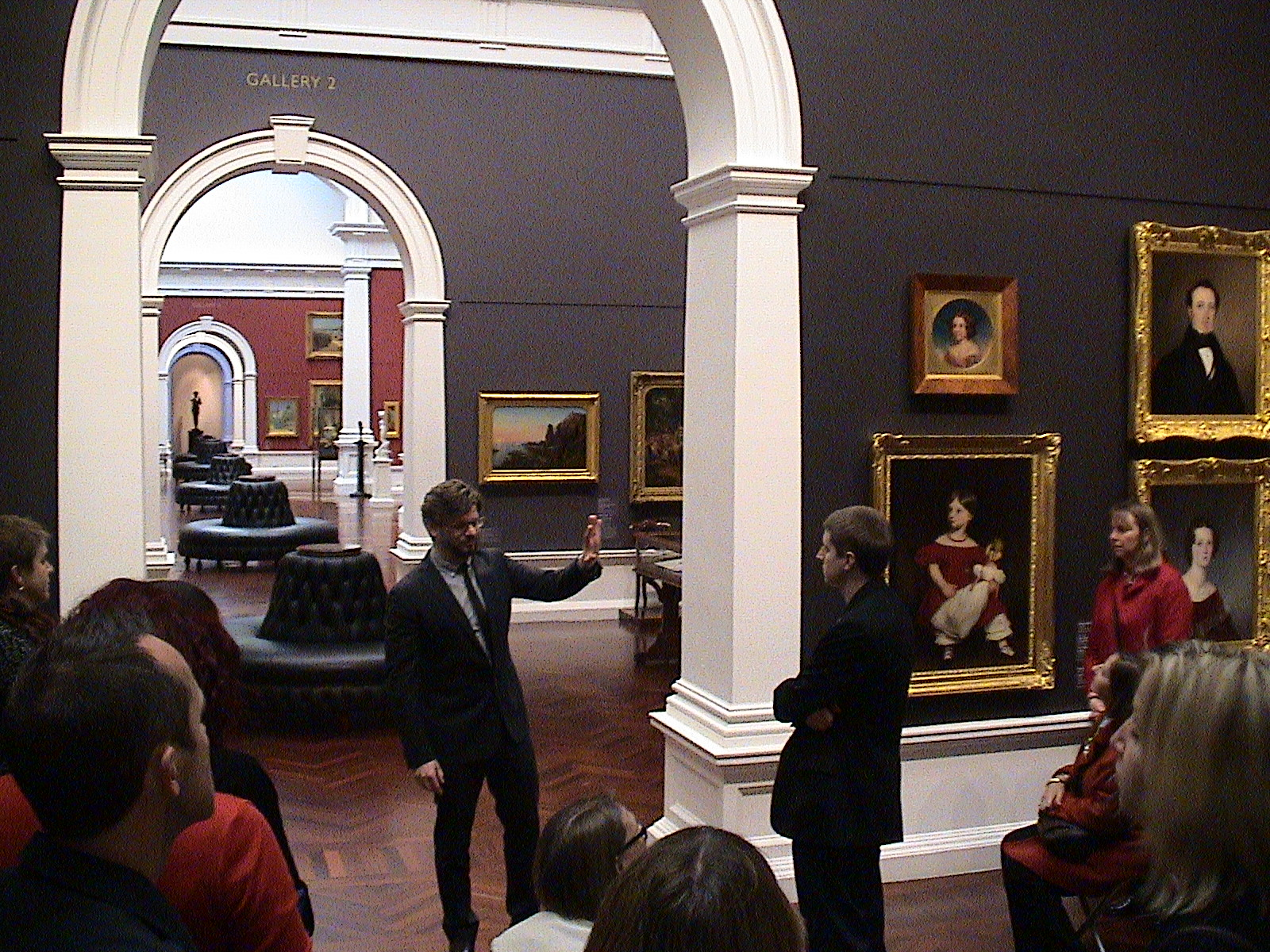
AGSA director Nick Mitzevich addressing Museums Australia conference delegates, 2012

Mitzevich began his career as a fine arts lecturer at the University of Newcastle. In 1999, he was offered a job as curator on a short-term contract at the NGA, but decided to turn it down and returned to the university.

=== 2001–2010: Newcastle and UQ ===
He ran the Newcastle Art Gallery for six years (2001–2007), during which he was credited with transforming the gallery by focusing on community engagement, programming, marketing, and collection development. He was appointed director of the University of Queensland Art Museum in July 2007, a position he held for three years.

=== 2010: AGSA ===
Mitzevich was appointed as director of the Art Gallery of South Australia (AGSA) in July 2010, when he was hardly known anywhere in Australia. He succeeded Christopher Menz, who left after five years in the role. Mitzevich remained in the role for eight years. During this time, he oversaw acquisitions including the digital projection of an AES+F video work onto the gallery's façade during the Adelaide Fringe in 2012, and acquiring 16 paintings from a single exhibition by Ben Quilty on the 130th anniversary of AGSA. AGSA also acquired and exhibited We Are All Flesh, an epoxy resin sculpture of two headless horses by Belgian artist Berlinde De Bruyckere, suspended from the ceiling of the gallery. As Director of AGSA, Mitzevich favoured the display of contemporary works in close proximity to colonial-era acquisitions. His achievements included the purchase of Camille Pissarro's Prairie à Eragny, with its A$4.5 million price raised entirely from donations. He also oversaw a major internal refurbishment of the gallery, introduced the Indigenous art festival Tarnanthi. He was the first gallery director in Australia to implement a provenance project, which investigates old objects which were acquired without historical checks.

Mitzevich departed from his position in April 2018, after being appointed as the NGA's sixth director from 2 July that year. He had particularly wanted to secure funding for a new gallery, Adelaide Contemporary, (Note: As yet unbuilt (2024), after being enthusiastically endorsed by former premier Jay Weatherill.) before a state election, before departing, and had not put in an application before the closing date. He was the unanimous choice of the selection panel. Lindy Lee's 6-metre (20 ft) sculpture "The Life of Stars", which was presented for the 2018 Biennial, Divided Worlds, was bought by the gallery as a permanent installation on its forecourt as a tribute and farewell "gift" for Mitzevich in April 2018. He said "The work is symbolic of what I tried to do here, and that's why it's perfect".

=== 2018: NGA ===
On the day of starting work at the National Gallery of Australia on 2 July 2018, Tim Fairfax, deputy chair of the NGA, donated A$2 million to establish a permanent children's gallery. Mitzevich travelled to London (where he met former arts minister and then high commissioner to the UK George Brandis) and Europe as well as Arnhem Land and Perth, WA, within a few months of being appointed, and then set about rehanging the Australian collection, converting it to a chronological rather than thematic sequence.

His first acquisition at the gallery was Francesco, a 4-metre (13 ft) wax sculpture depicting Italian art curator Francesco Bonami "standing on a fridge and staring at his phone", created by Swiss artist Urs Fischer. The sculpture is transient, as a flame within will gradually melt the work over six or seven months, and was due to be installed in early 2019. He also planned a number of exhibitions for 2019, including two regional ones.

His term at the NGA has encountered several challenges: in January 2020 the gallery had to be shut because of smoke from bushfires and then again after a hailstorm. A couple of months later, the COVID-19 pandemic struck, leading to a closure of over 70 days. In the middle of the year Mitzevich had a cycling accident, damaging his knee and requiring eight weeks on crutches. But in November 2020 the NGA finally opened its Know My Name exhibition, which is part of a large project to recognise Australian women artists from the 20th century to the present, with the aim of addressing historical gender bias. In January 2021 he had plans to re-hang the permanent collection, swapping the location of international art with that of Australian art.

In 2024 Mitzevich served on the jury for the $60 million revitalization of the National Gallery of Australia's three-hectare sculpture garden, alongside Philip Goad, Nici Cumpston, and Teresa Moller.

== Quotes ==
Mitzevich believes in the transformational power of art, based on his own experiences:

I wish I had challenged the bullying and challenged people's perceptions of me growing up. That's why I want to make sure that what I do develops an inclusive and tolerant Australia and give people the gift of seeing the world through an artist's eye.

On the National Gallery:

We're the first to admit the national collection needs to constantly evolve. It needs to constantly reflect what Australia is. It isn't limited by state borders, it's about harnessing the national psyche and taking the pulse of the world through the eyes of artists. ... People think it's about personal taste. It's not. I consider it to be a science. I analyse the past, I think about what's in the collection, I survey what's happening now, and then have to make judgements about what's available.

== Honours and recognition ==
- 2020: Key to the City of Newcastle
- 2021: Chevalier de l'Ordre des Arts et des Lettres, for his work in advancing French culture
- 2022: Honorary doctorate of fine arts from Newcastle University, in recognition of his contribution to the arts and the arts sector more broadly
- 2023: Newton-John Alumni Medal from the University of Newcastle, named after Professor Brinley Newton-John, which "recognises innovation and creativity of alumni who have achieved excellence in arts, creative sectors and culture"

== Footnotes ==
Cultural offices
Preceded by Christopher Menz	Director of the Art Gallery of South Australia; 2010-2018	Succeeded by Rhana Devenport
Preceded by Ron Radford	Director of the National Gallery of Australia; 2018–present	Succeeded by
