= Ben Quilty =

Australian artist and social commentator (born 1973)

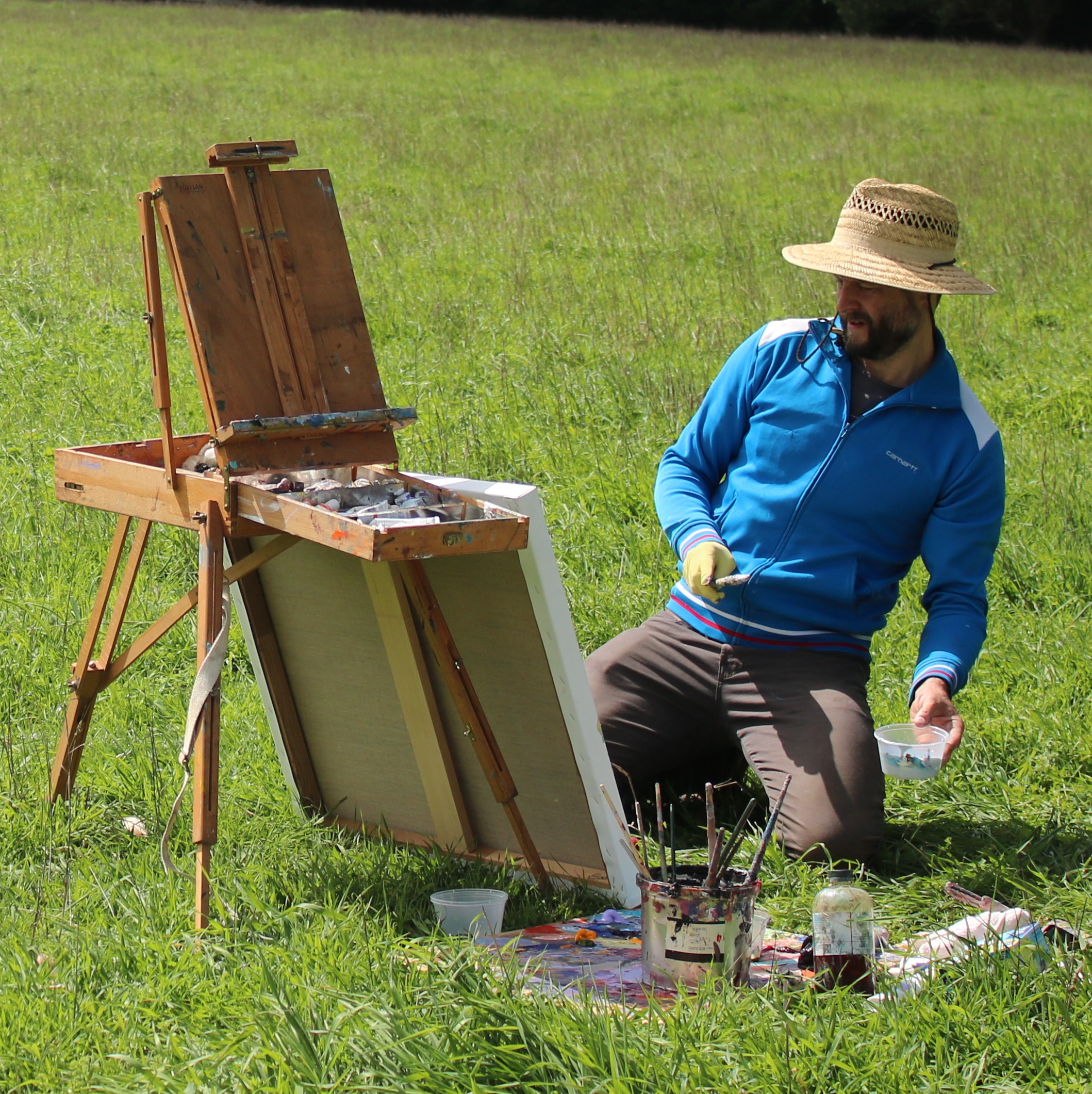
- Quilty in 2017
- Born: 1973 (age 52–53); Sydney, New South Wales, Australia
- Known for: Painting, contemporary art
- Awards: 2014 Prudential Eye Award; 2011 Archibald Prize; 2009 Doug Moran National Portrait Prize

Ben Quilty (born 1973) is an Australian artist and social commentator, who has won a series of painting prizes: the 2014 Prudential Eye Award, 2011 Archibald Prize, and 2009 Doug Moran National Portrait Prize. He has been described as one of Australia's most famous living artists.

== Early life and education ==
Quilty was born in Sydney in 1973, and grew up in Kenthurst in Sydney's north-west.

He was educated at Kenthurst Public School and Oakhill College, where he exhibited his HSC artwork in ArtExpress in 1991 (or 1992). Subsequently, Quilty was selected as the recipient of the Julian Ashton Summer School Scholarship.

After high school, Quilty followed his interest in art and obtained a Bachelor of Visual Arts in Painting from Sydney College of the Arts at the University of Sydney, graduating in 1994. He earned a Certificate in Aboriginal Culture and History in 1996, and went on to study visual communication, design and women's studies at Western Sydney University, graduating with a Bachelor of Arts in 2001.

== Career ==
In 2002 Quilty won the Brett Whiteley Travelling Art Scholarship, which increased his exposure to the public, and he has been working full-time as an artist since then.

He has been described as one of Australia's most famous living artists.

=== Official war artist ===
From 11 October until 3 November 2011, Quilty was attached to the Australian Defence Force observing their activities in Kabul, Kandahar and Tarin Kowt. His task was to record and interpret the experiences of Australian service personnel who are deployed as part of Operation Slipper. After his return, Quilty spent six months producing work for the Australian War Memorial's National Collection. Such work is in the tradition of war artists that began in World War I with artists Arthur Streeton and George Lambert. Quilty's experiences as a war artist and the work he produced as a result of it was explored in the ABC TV's Australian Story program "War Paint" screened on 3 September 2012.

== Style, subjects and practice ==
Quilty's work has been influenced by a number of life experiences, including the drug and drinking culture of his youth, later political activism, and his experience as a war artist.

In 2002 he exhibited a series of paintings featuring his beloved Torana car, signifying the rituals of mateship among his cohort. A few years later, Van Rorschach (2005) represented a white minivan, a more practical vehicle. While, despite the name, this painting did not use the Rorschach technique (aka inkblot technique, used for psychological evaluation), he started using this technique in his later work, to explore the often violent colonial history of Australia.

Quilty is known for his distinctive style of oil painting and a range of topics which includes portraits (he won the Archibald Prize for his portrait of artist and friend Margaret Olley), examination of masculine culture, expression of psychological interiors, and others which show his engagement with a range of social issues, such as the death penalty, asylum seekers, and massacres of Indigenous Australians.

He lives and works in the Southern Highlands of New South Wales.

== Other roles and activities ==
Quilty was a driving force in the establishment of a new gallery, the first in the Southern Highlands, situated in the grounds of historic Retford Park at Bowral. Called Ngununggula (meaning "belonging" in the local Gundungurra language), the gallery was created out of an old dairy, after Quilty led a major fundraising campaign and A$7.6 million was spent on its restoration and conversion. It opened in October 2021, and in mid-2022 featured a major exhibition of the work of brothers Abdul and Abdul-Rahman Abdullah, along with video works by Tracey Moffatt.

== Honours and awards ==
- 2018: Elected as a Fellow of the Royal Society of New South Wales
- 2015: Honorary Doctorate of Creative Arts, Western Sydney University
- 2014: Prudential Eye Award (Overall), Singapore
- 2014: Prudential Eye Award (Painting), Singapore
- 2012: Finalist, Archibald Prize, Art Gallery of New South Wales, Sydney
- 2012: Finalist, Gold Award, Rockhampton Art Gallery, Rockhampton
- 2012: Winner, Redlands Art Prize, National Art School Gallery, Sydney
- 2011: Winner, Archibald Prize, Art Gallery of New South Wales, Sydney, for his portrait of Australian artist Margaret Olley (after previously being a finalist for the prize several times) It was his seventh entry to the prize.
- 2009: Doug Moran National Portrait Prize, Sydney, for his painting of Australian musician Jimmy Barnes
- 2007: National Self Portrait Prize, University of Queensland Art Museum, Brisbane, for the painting Dead (Over the Hills and Far Away)
- 2004: Kings School Art Prize, Sydney
- 2004: Metro 5 Art Prize, Melbourne
- 2002: Brett Whiteley Travelling Art Scholarship, Art Gallery of New South Wales, Sydney
- 1991: Julian Ashton Summer School Scholarship, Sydney
- 1989: Rocks Painters Picnic, Age and Open Winner, Sydney Festival

== Exhibitions ==
Quilty's works have been exhibited at many locations, both solo and group exhibitions.

=== Solo exhibitions ===
In 2019 Quilty, a major touring survey exhibition, the first in a decade, curated by Lisa Slade of the Art Gallery of South Australia (AGSA), was hosted first at AGSA (March 2019), then at the Queensland Gallery of Modern Art and the Art Gallery of New South Wales (October 2019). The exhibition included works from his time in Afghanistan, Greece, Serbia and Lebanon, and celebrated his connection to artist Margaret Olley as well as including new Rorschach-based works documenting the Myall Creek massacre and an hitherto unrecorded massacre in the Anangu Pitjantjatjara Yankunytjatjara (APY lands) in South Australia, titled Irin Irinji. The run at the Art Gallery of New South Wales coincided with the release of the documentary Quilty – Painting the Shadows, made by Catherine Hunter, on ABC Television on 19 November 2019. A book, Quilty, was published to accompany the exhibition, which includes essays Slade, Quilty's close friend, author Richard Flanagan, and head curator of International Art at the Art Gallery of NSW, Justin Paton.

Other solo exhibitions include:

- Ben Quilty LIVE! University of Queensland Art Museum, Brisbane (2009)
- Trashed, LOST Projects, Manila, Philippines (2010)
- A Convergence of Birds, Goulburn Regional Art Gallery, Goulburn, New South Wales (2011)
- Ben Quilty, Jan Murphy Gallery at Korean International Art Fair, Seoul (2012)
- Trigger-Happy: Ben Quilty's Brave New World, Drill Hall Gallery, Australian National University, Canberra (8 November 2013–15 December 2013)
- Ben Quilty, Saatchi Gallery, London (4 July 2014–3 August 2014)
- Ben Quilty, Galerie Allen, Paris (17 September 2014–11 October 2014)
- Ben Quilty, Kuta Beach, Hong Kong Art Fair with Tolarno Galleries, Hong Kong (2014)
- Ben Quilty, Bendigo Art Gallery, which included works from the Saatchi exhibition (12 December 2014–1 March 2015), Bendigo, Victoria
- Ben Quilty: After Afghanistan, Australian War Memorial Special Exhibitions Gallery, Canberra, touring (2014–2016)
- Ben Quilty: Straight White Male, Pearl Lam Galleries, Hong Kong (16 January 2015–1 March 2015)

=== Group exhibitions ===
Group exhibitions include:

- An Oeuvre Both Abundant and Diverse, SCA Galleries, Sydney College of the Arts (2010)
- Together in Harmony for 50 Years: Linking Australian and Korean Arts, Korea Cultural Exchange Centre, Seoul (2011)
- Rapture of Death, Gippsland Art Gallery, Victoria (2012)
- Divide and Context, Goulburn Regional Art Gallery, New South Wales (2013)
- Dark Heart: Adelaide Biennial of Australian Art (1 March 2014–11 May 2014)
- Melbourne Art Fair (13 August 2014–17 August 2014)
- Embodied, Pearl Lam Galleries, Hong Kong (7 November 2014–10 January 2015)
- Australian Artists in Bali: 1930s to Now, McClelland Sculpture Park + Gallery, Langwarrin, Victoria (2015)
- Length & Breadth: new acquisitions from the Parliament House Art Collection, Parliament House, Canberra (2016)
- Sappers & Shrapnel: Contemporary Art and the Art of the Trenches, Art Gallery of South Australia (11 November 2016–29 January 2017)
- NGV Triennial 2017, National Gallery of Victoria (15 December 2017–15 April 2018)
- Art Basel Hong Kong, Tolarno Galleries, Hong Kong (2017)

=== Other work on display ===
In December 2018, a Christmas tree created by Quilty and artist Mirra Whale out of refugees' discarded lifevests was displayed in St Paul's Cathedral, Melbourne.

== Collections ==
As well as being held in private collections in Australia and around the world, examples of Quilty's work are held in a number of public collections in Australia, including:

- Art Gallery of New South Wales (Golden Soil, Wealth for Toil (2004), acquired 2005, Fairy Bower Rorschach (2012), acquired 2012, and Self Portrait, the Executioner (2015), acquired 2015),
- Art Gallery of South Australia (Self portrait (as Cook ...) (2011), and Self portrait (as Cook with sunglasses) (2011)),
- Australian War Memorial, Canberra
- Bendigo Art Gallery (Kuta Rorschach No 2 (2013), acquired 2014),
- Goulburn Regional Art Gallery (Torana (2007), and Skull Rorschach (2009))
- Macquarie Bank, Australia
- Museum of Contemporary Art Australia (Van Rorschach (2005), acquired 2007),
- National Gallery of Australia, Canberra
- National Gallery of Victoria, Melbourne
- Newcastle Art Gallery Cullen 'before and after (2006).
- Parliament House, Canberra (Lead Shot Rorschach (2013)),
- Queensland Art Gallery (Sergeant P, after Afghanistan (2012)).
- Shepparton Art Museum (Jug (Loydy) (2014), acquired 2018, Conscript (Private Phil Butler) (2014), acquired 2016, Scream after Leonardo (2014), acquired 2018, Jug (Nose) (2014), acquired 2018, Jug (Leonardo) (2014), acquired 2018
- University of Queensland Art Museum, Brisbane

Awards
Preceded by Sam Leach	Archibald Prize; 2011 for Margaret Olley	Succeeded by Tim Storrier
