= Khadim Ali =

Australian artist

- خادم علی
- Born: 1978 (age 47–48); Quetta, Pakistan
- Education: National College of Arts, Lahore; University of Tehran; University of New South Wales
- Known for: Painting and Mughal miniature painting
- Notable work: Illustrations inspired by the Shahnameh
- Movement: Contemporary art

Khadim Ali (Urdu: خادم علی, born in Queta, Pakistan, 1978) is an Australian painter of Hazara descent.

== Early life and education ==
Khadim Ali was born in 1978 in the Pakistani city of Quetta to a family of refugees from Bamiyan Province in Afghanistan, who belonged to the Hazara ethnic minority. He grew up in Pakistan close to the Afghanistan border.As a child he was exposed to the beauty of Ferdowsi's Persian epic 10th-century poetic work Shahnameh (Book of Kings), which his grandfather sung, and the miniature paintings that illustrated it.

He studied Mughal miniature painting at the National College of Arts in Lahore, and calligraphy at Tehran University in Iran.

== Career ==
After being a guest artist at the Fukuoka Asian Art Museum in Fukuoka, Japan in 2006, in 2010 Ali moved to Sydney, Australia. In 2012 he graduated with a master's degree in arts from the University of New South Wales.

== Practice and themes ==
Using classical Mughal miniature methods, Ali drew new illustrations for Shahanama. He uses images from history, poetry, mythology and politics to investigate through art the events of the wars in Afghanistan, the persecution, exile and discrimination, and the loss caused by destruction of culture. He references the Buddhas of Bamiyan, huge statues that were destroyed in March 2001 by Taliban extremists.

== Exhibitions ==
In 2006 the artist participated in the Venice Biennale, and in 2012 at the Documenta exhibition of contemporary art in Kassel, Germany.

In February–March 2018, Ali's work was included in an exhibition curated by Abdul-Rahman Abdullah and Nur Shkembi, called Waqt al-tagheer: Time of change at ACE Open, Adelaide as part of the Adelaide Festival. The exhibition showcased the work of 11 Muslim Australian artists, including Abdul-Rahman's brother Abdul Abdullah and photographic artist Hoda Afshar.

In November 2023 participated in a major group exhibition Voice Against Reason Museum MACAN along with others 23 artists from Australia, Bangladesh, India, Indonesia, Japan, Singapore, Taiwan, Thailand, and Vietnam.

Work by Ali is in the collection of:

- Art Gallery of New South Wales
- Art Gallery of Western Australia
- Guggenheim Museum
- Sharjah Art Foundation
