= Margaret Olley =

Australian artist (1923–2011)

Margaret Olley AC
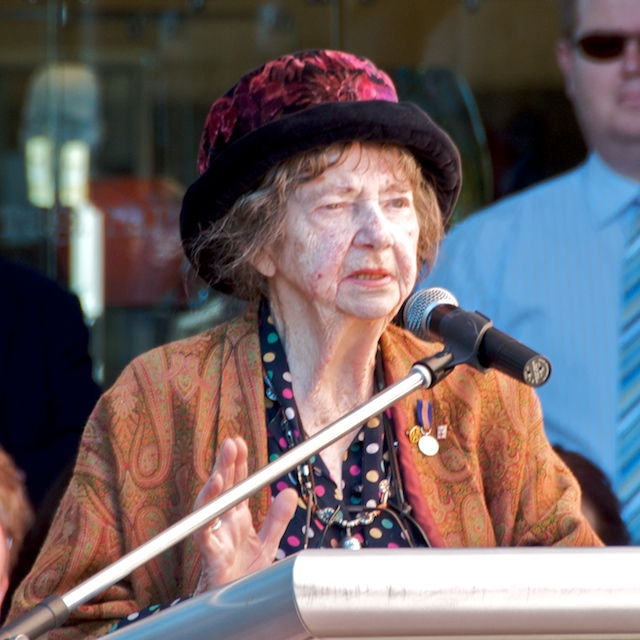
- Margaret Olley in August 2009
- Born: Margaret Hannah Olley; 24 June 1923; Lismore, New South Wales, Australia
- Died: 26 July 2011 (aged 88); Paddington, New South Wales, Australia
- Education: East Sydney Technical College
- Known for: Painting
- Notable work: Still life with pink fish (1948), AGNSW
- Awards: Mosman Art Prize (1947)

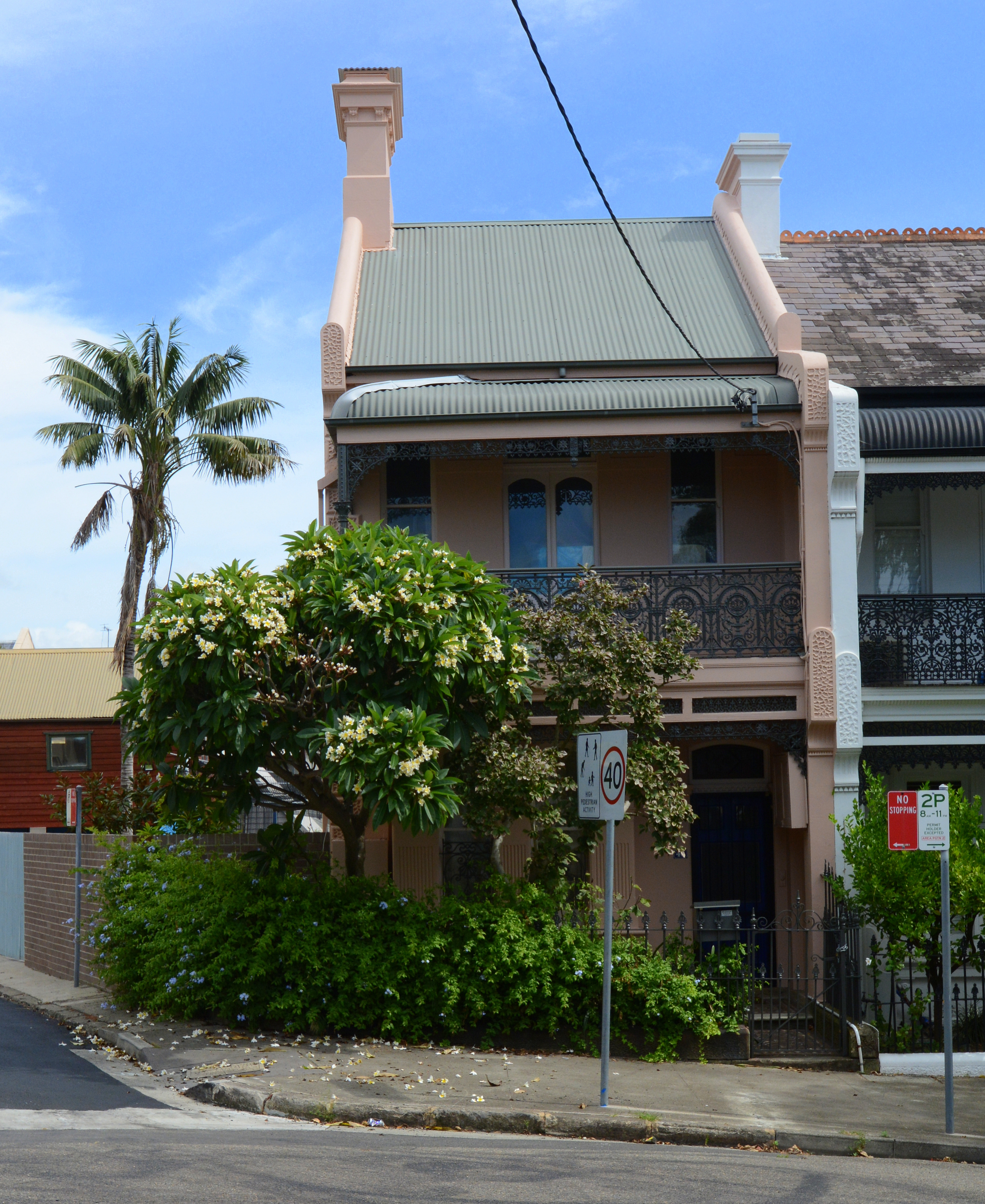
Olley's home in Paddington

Margaret Hannah Olley AC (24 June 1923 – 26 July 2011) was an Australian painter. She held over ninety solo exhibitions during her lifetime.

== Early life ==
Margaret Olley was born in Lismore, New South Wales. She was the eldest of three children of Joseph Olley and Grace (née Temperley). The Olley family moved to Tully in far north Queensland in 1925, with Margaret boarding at St Anne's in Townsville in 1929, before returning to New South Wales in 1931. The family temporarily moved to Brisbane in 1935 with Margaret staying to attend Somerville House in Brisbane during her high school years. She was so focused on art that she dropped one French class in order to take another art lesson with teacher and artist Caroline Barker.

In 1941, Margaret commenced classes at Brisbane Central Technical College and then moved to Sydney in 1943 to enrol in an Art Diploma course at East Sydney Technical College where she graduated with A-class honours in 1945.

== Career ==
Olley concentrated on still life and colour.

James V. Duhig reporting on her 1962 sell-out show at Johnstone Gallery in Brisbane wrote; "Margaret Olley has reached the flood tide of her art and has stepped up to the top rank of our artists," noting also that all the paintings sold at preview for a gross of £3000, then an Australian record for a woman, but attracted no interest from Brisbane Art Gallery.

In 1997 a major retrospective of her work was organised by the Art Gallery of New South Wales. She received the inaugural Mosman Art Prize in 1947.

== Newcastle ==
In November 1965 Olley moved to Newcastle. Whilst living here she painted 23 paintings of the city and waterfront in a series known as the 'Newcastle Watercolours'. Olley began a 'love affair' with the city and bought several properties in Newcastle and at East Maitland. This established a long association with the city and a major influence on her work. Several of her paintings can be found in institutions in Newcastle and the Hunter including, the University of Newcastle, Newcastle Art Gallery and Maitland Regional Art Gallery.

== Philanthropy ==
On 13 July 2006 she donated more works to the Art Gallery of New South Wales; her donations included more than 130 works worth $7 million.

== Tributes and honours ==
Olley was twice the subject of an Archibald Prize winning painting; the first in 1948 by William Dobell, who painted her in a borrowed wedding dress made of parachute silk, and the other in 2011 by Ben Quilty. She was also the subject of paintings by many of her artist friends, including Russell Drysdale and several by Danelle Bergstrom including a triptych portrait that was a finalist in the 2003 Archibald Prize.

On 10 June 1991, in the Queen's Birthday Honours list, Olley was made an Officer of the Order of Australia "for service as an artist and to the promotion of art". On 12 June 2006, she was awarded Australia's highest civilian honour, the Companion of the Order, "for service as one of Australia's most distinguished artists, for support and philanthropy to the visual and performing arts, and for encouragement of young and emerging artists".

In 2006, Olley was awarded the degree Doctor of Fine Arts honoris causa by the University of Newcastle.

== Final exhibition ==
Of the last paintings that Olley did before her death, 27 were exhibited at Sotheby's Australia in Woollahra in an exhibition entitled The Inner Sanctum of Margaret Olley that opened on 2 March 2012. Olley had put the final touches on the show the day before she died and Philip Bacon, who had exhibited her work for decades, had prepared a catalogue to show her that weekend. The opening night was attended by about 350 people among whom were the Governor-General of Australia, Quentin Bryce, who gave an address, in which she said that Olley's work was often just like the artist, "filled with optimism". Other attendees at the opening included Penelope Wensley, the Governor of Queensland, Edmund Capon, Ben Quilty and Barry Humphries.

== Death ==
Olley died at her home in Paddington in July 2011, aged 88. The cause of her death was respiratory failure. She never married and had no children. Her Paddington home sold for over three million dollars in July 2014.

== Legacy ==
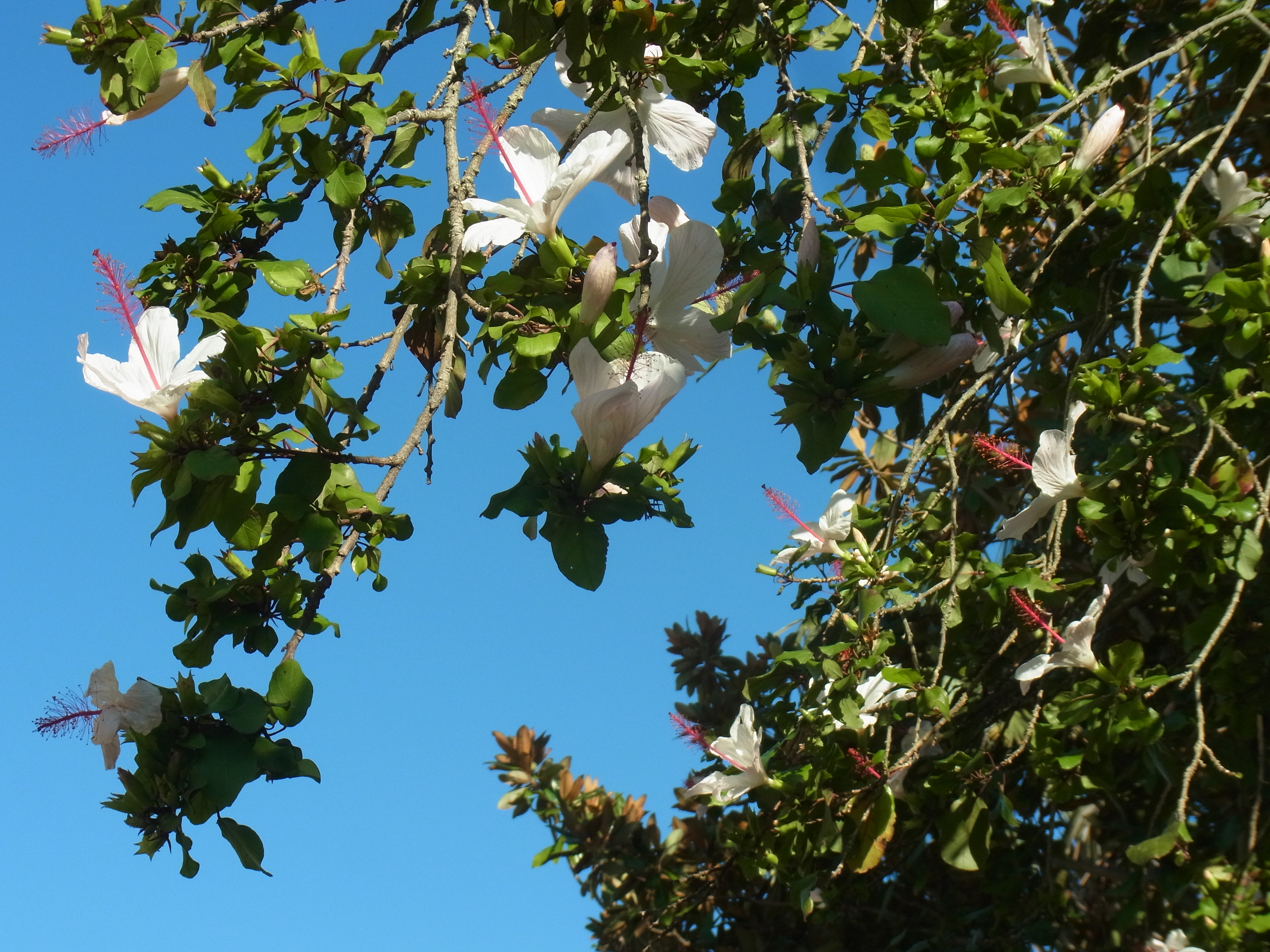
Hibiscus in flower in front yard of her Paddington home, March 2014

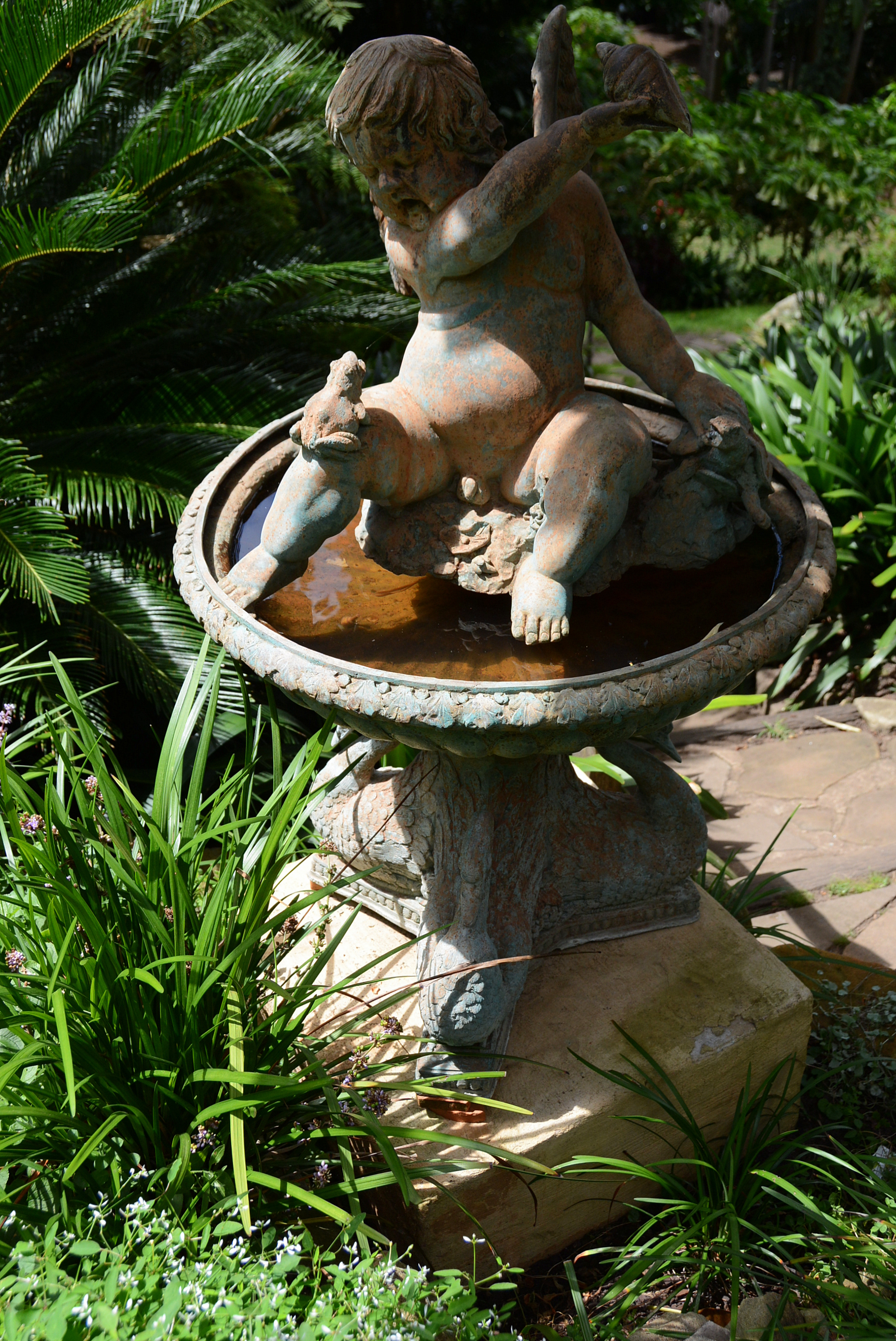
Antique fountain originally in Margaret Olley's Paddington garden, now part of Wendy Whiteley's garden at Lavender Bay

After Olley's death, the Art Gallery of New South Wales used funds donated by its Collection Circle to purchase Nasturtiums, a painting by E. Phillips Fox as a memorial to her.

Her ideas about art were explored in conversations held between 19 October 2009 and 22 September 2010 with author Barry Pearce, whose book based on them was published in the year of her death.

Part of Olley's Paddington house, well known for its items that the painter collected and used as subject matter for her art, described as "her lifelong installation", has been recreated at the Tweed River Art Gallery, an area not far from where the artist was born. The architect of the Tweed's new Margaret Olley Centre, Bud Brannigan, said that it would be faithful to Olley's house, "in all of its glory".

There is a comprehensive photographic record of her studio and work, shot on the morning she died, by artist photographer Greg Weight. This suite of prints, has been donated to the Tweed River Art Gallery.

A documentary by Catherine Hunter, Margaret Olley – A Life in Paint follows Olley as she completes her last – and many believe her finest – works, those painted in the 18 months leading up to her death. The critically acclaimed film interprets Olley's style, passion and artistic evolution through the reflections of her peers, including former National Gallery of Australia director Betty Churcher, curator Barry Pearce and Ben Quilty, whose portrait of Olley won the 2011 Archibald Prize.

In 2020, a river-class ferry on the Sydney Ferries network was named in her honour.
