= Timothy Potts =

Australian art historian and archaeologist

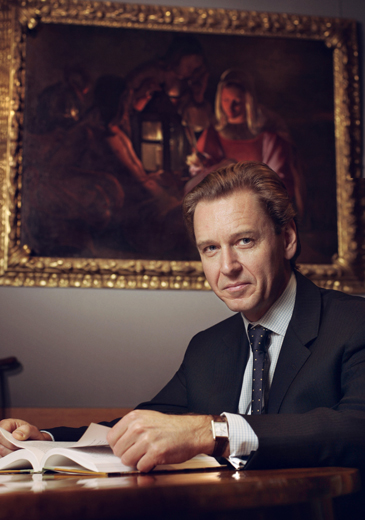
- Potts in 2012

Director of the J. Paul Getty Museum
- Incumbent
- Assumed office 1 September 2012
- Preceded by: James Cuno (acting)

Director of the Fitzwilliam Museum
- In office 2007–2012
- Preceded by: Duncan Robinson
- Succeeded by: Tim Knox

Director of the Kimbell Art Museum
- In office 1998–2007
- Preceded by: Edmund P. Pillsbury
- Succeeded by: Eric McCauley Lee

Director of the National Gallery of Victoria
- In office 1994–1998
- Preceded by: James Mollison
- Succeeded by: Gerard Vaughan

Personal details
- Born: 1958 (age 67–68) Sydney, New South Wales, Australia
- Education: University of Sydney (BA); Christ Church, Oxford (PhD)
- Occupation: Art historian, archaeologist, museum director

Timothy Potts (born 1958) is an Australian art historian, archaeologist, and museum director. He became the director of the J. Paul Getty Museum on 1 September 2012.

== Biography ==
Timothy Potts was educated at the University of Sydney (BA Hons) and holds a DPhil in Near Eastern art and archaeology from the University of Oxford, where he was a research lecturer and British Academy Research Fellow in Near Eastern Archaeology and Art at Christ Church, Oxford (1985–1990). His research interests are Ancient Near Eastern art history, archaeology and history; museology; the classical tradition in western art.

Potts acted as co-director of the University of Sydney excavations at Pella, Jordan from 1982 to 1989. He worked at Lehman Brothers in New York from 1990 to 1994, after which he became director of the National Gallery of Victoria (1994–1998). In conjunction with his directorship at the National Gallery of Victoria, Timothy was an adjunct professor at La Trobe University, and a professorial fellow at the University of Melbourne. He was the director of the Kimbell Art Museum in Fort Worth, Texas from 1998 to 2007 and the director of the Fitzwilliam Museum in Cambridge, England from 2007 to 2012.

== Writing ==
Potts is a specialist in the art and archaeology of the ancient Near East and Mediterranean on which he has written widely. His works in the field include:

- Civilization British Museum Ancient Trea
- Kimbell Art Museum: Handbook of the Collection
- From Renoir to Picasso : Masterpices from the Musee de L'Orangerie
- Mesopotamia & the East: An Archaeological & Historical Study of Foreign Relations 3400-2000 Bc. (Oxford University Committee for Archaeology Monograph Ser No. 37.)
- Post-modernisms: Origins, Consequences, Reconsiderations

== Past Directorships ==
In 2007, Duncan Robinson (now CBE) retired, Potts took over as the Fitzwilliam Museum's 12th Director. During his time at the Fitzwilliam (2007–2012), Potts served as Chairman of the Art Committee, with Mr Donald Hearn as Bursar, at Clare College, Cambridge Potts also directed studies in the History of Art for Clare College. Between his academic and museum positions, Potts had a corporate career with Lehman Brothers where he was Senior Vice President of the Media and Communications Group, Investment Banking Department, (New York and London) from 1990 to 1994.

During Potts' tenure as director of the Kimbell Art Museum he added many pieces of art to the Kimbell's permanent collection: in sculpture, St John the Baptist erroneously attributed by Michelozzo, Virgin and Child by Donatello, Relief Head of Christ attributed to Tullio Lombardo, Isabella d’Este by Gian Romano, Late Gothic Silver-Gilt Virgin and Child (anonymous), and Modello for the Fountain of the Moor by Bernini; in paintings, The Judgment of Paris by Lucas Cranach the Elder, and A Dentist by Candlelight by Gerrit Dou; in antiquities, Head of an Athlete (Apoxyomenos) after Lysippos, and The Death of Pentheus by Douris; in Precolumbian art, 5th-century Maya Jade Belt Ornament, and Codex-Style Cup showing Scribal Training by the "Princeton Painter"; and in Asian art, Bamboo and Rocks by Tan Zhirui.

Exhibitions at The Kimbell Art Museum under Potts’s directorship included:

- Picturing the Bible: The Earliest Christian Art (18 November 2007 – 20 March 2008)
- Drama and Desire Japanese Paintings from the Floating World, 1690–1850 (11 February – 29 April 2007)
- The Mirror and the Mask: Portraiture in the Age of Picasso (17 June – 16 September 2007)
- Masterpiece: A New Look at the Kimbell Collection (30 April – 23 July 2006)
- Hatshepsut: From Queen to Pharaoh (27 August – 31 December 2006)
- Gauguin and Impressionism (18 December 2005 – 26 March 2006)
- Palace & Mosque: Islamic Art from the Victoria and Albert Museum (3 April – 4 September 2005)
- Turner and Venice (15 February – 30 May 2004)
- Genius of the French Rococo: The Drawings of François Boucher (1703–1770) and Boucher's Mythological Paintings:The Last Great Series Reunited (18 January – 18 April 2004)
- Caravaggio to Dalí: 100 Masterpieces from the Wadsworth Atheneum Museum of Art (27 June – 26 September 2004)
- Stubbs & The Horse (14 November – 6 February 2005)
- Modigliani & The Artists of Montparnasse (9 February – 25 May 2003)
- The Quest for Immortality: Treasures of Ancient Egypt (4 May – 14 September 2003)
- Painted Prayers: Medieval and Renaissance Books of Hours from the Morgan Library (12 October 2003 – 18 January 2004)
- Bartolomé Esteban Murillo 1617–1682 (10 March – 16 June 2002)
- Mondrian: The Path to Abstraction 1892–1914 (18 August – 8 December 2002)
- The Design and Construction of the Kimbell Art Museum: A 30th-Anniversary Exhibition (21 September – 3 November 2002)
- The Floral Art of Pierre-Joseph Redouté (17 November 2002 – 2 March 2003)
- European Masterpieces: Six Centuries of Paintings from the National Gallery of Victoria, Australia (18 March – 27 May 2001)
- Treasures From A Lost Civilization: Ancient Chinese Art from Sichuan (30 September 2001 – 13 January 2002)
- Worlds of Transformation: Tibetan Art of Wisdom and Compassion (16 January – 26 March)
- Giovanni Battista Moroni: Renaissance Portraitist (26 February – 28 May 2001)
- Straganoff: The Palace and Collections of a Russian Noble Family (2 July – 1 October 2000)
- From Renoir to Picasso: Masterpieces from the Musée de l'Orangerie (12 November 2000 – 25 February 2001)
- Gifts of the Nile: Ancient Egyptian Faience (24 January – 25 April 1999)
- Matisse & Picasso: A Gentle Rivalry (31 January – 2 May 1999)
