= Gerard Vaughan =

Gerard Vaughan may refer to:

- Sir Gerard Vaughan (British politician) (1923–2003), British Conservative minister
- Gerard Vaughan (Australian politician) (born 1946), former member of the Victorian Legislative Assembly
- Gerard Vaughan (art historian) (born 1953), Australian art historian and curator
- Gerard Vaughan, CEO of the Alcohol Advisory Council of New Zealand
