= Something More (Tracey Moffatt) =

Something More is a 1989 photographic work by Australian artist Tracey Moffatt. It was commissioned by the Murray Art Museum Albury (formerly the Albury Regional Art Gallery) and shot in Link Studios in Wodonga. It consists of nine photographs: six colour and three black-and-white.

The series references the works of Drysdale and Namatjira.

The series is also known as "Something More #1 1989" or "Something More".
