= Islamic Museum of Australia =

Museum in Melbourne, Australia

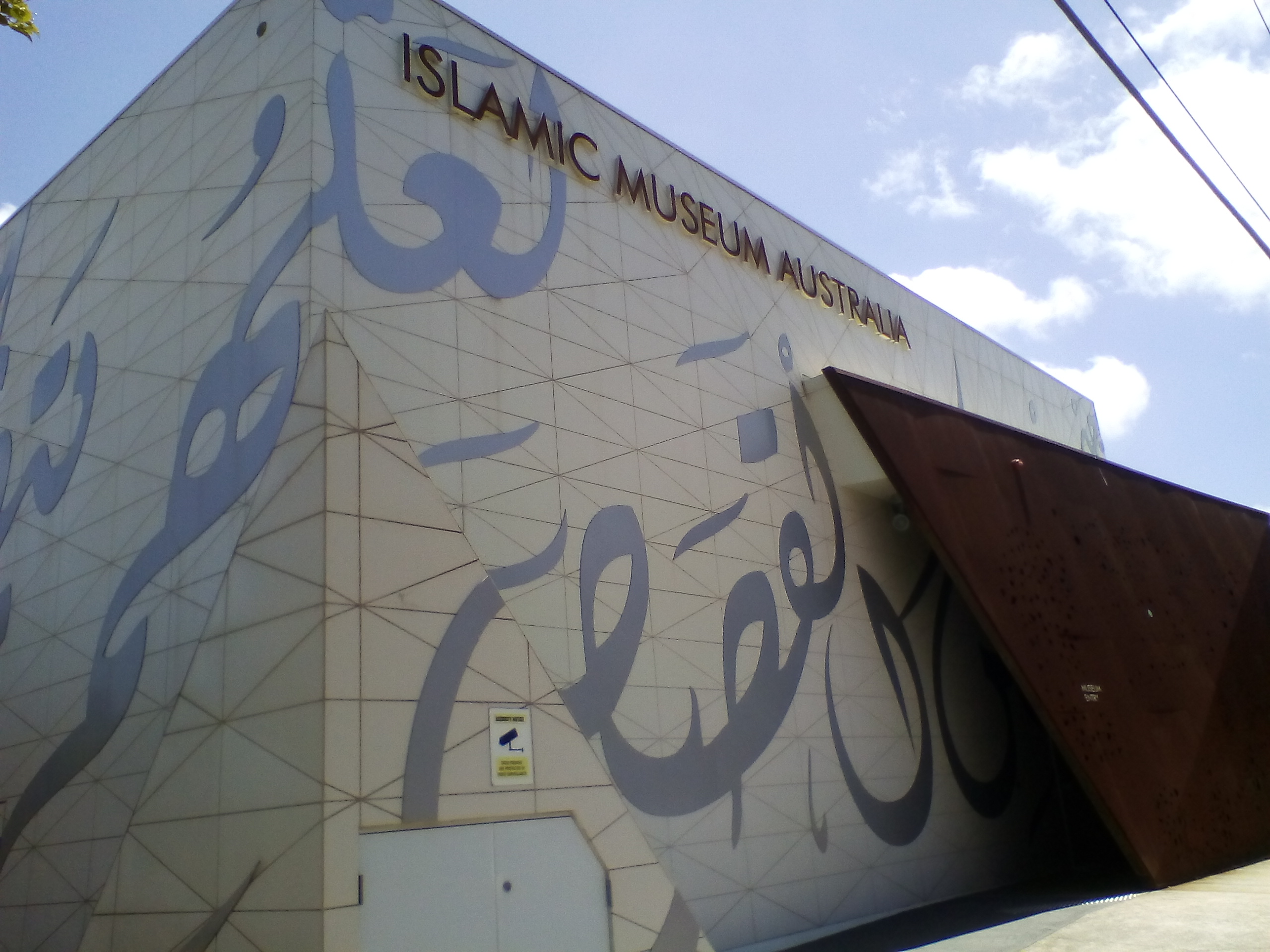
- Established: 2010
- Location: 15A Anderson Road, Thornbury, Victoria, Australia
- Coordinates: 37.75451°S 144.98079°E
- Type: museum
- Website: islamicmuseum.org.au

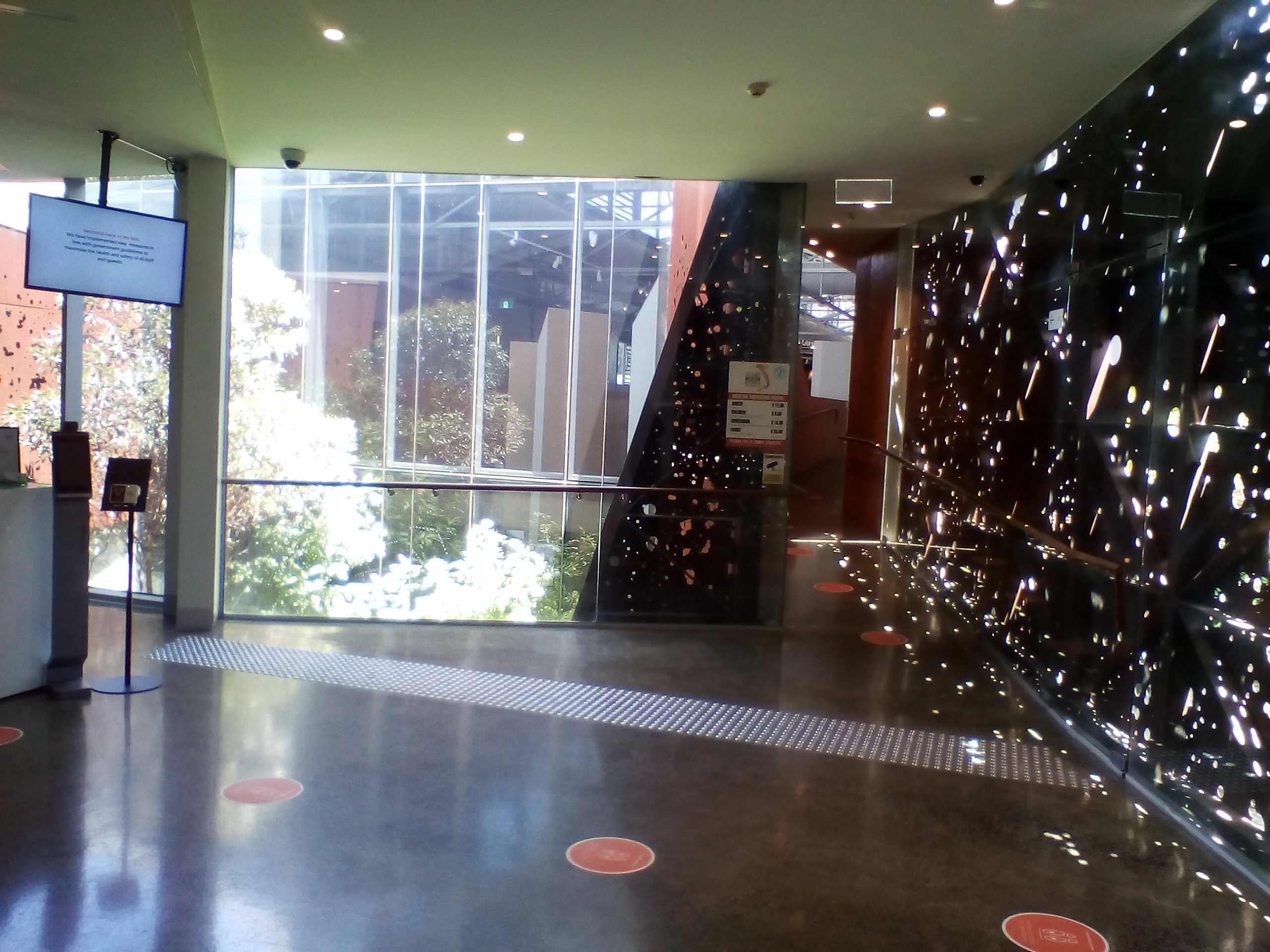
Entrance foyer

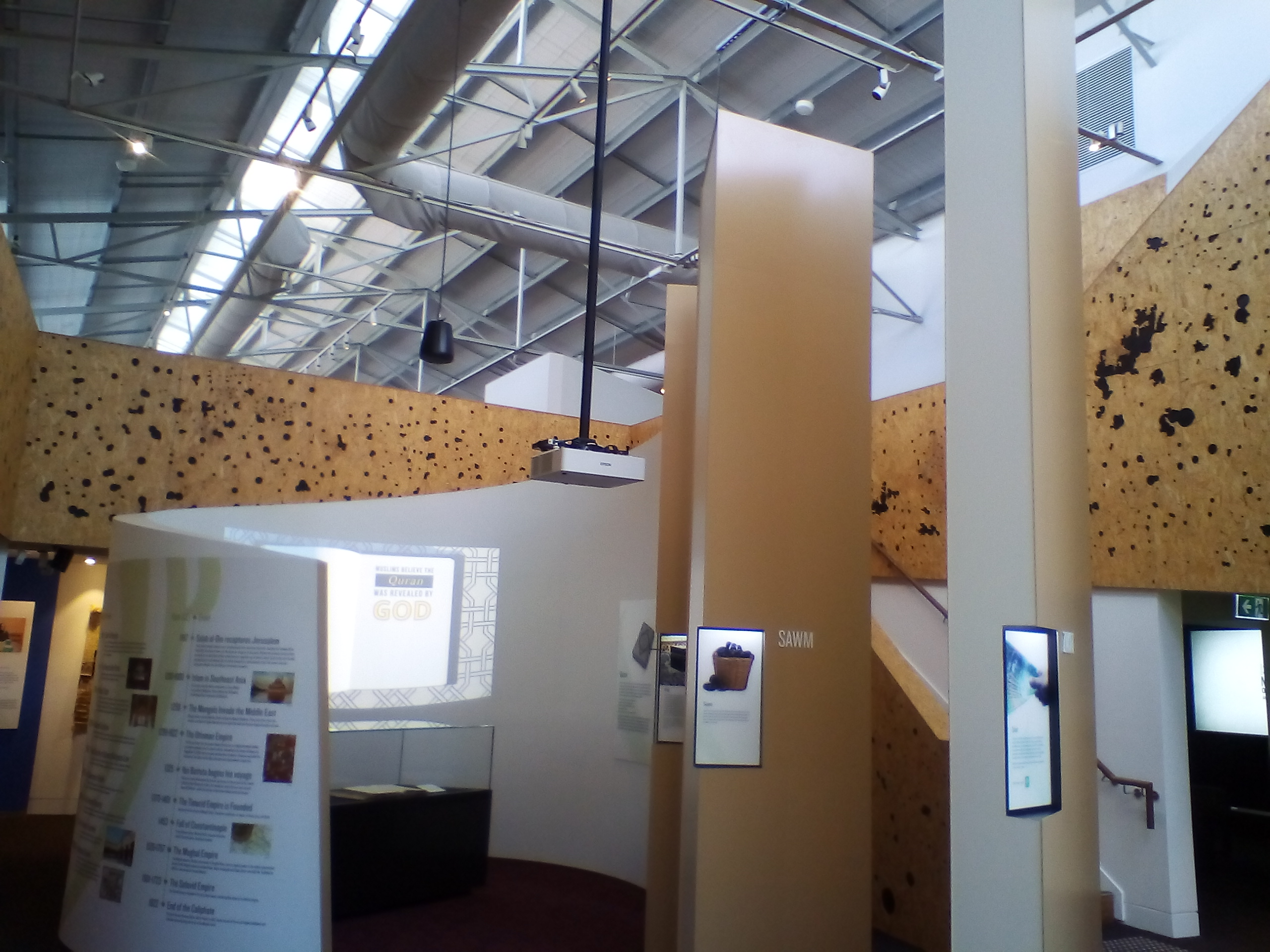
Islamic Faith exhibit area

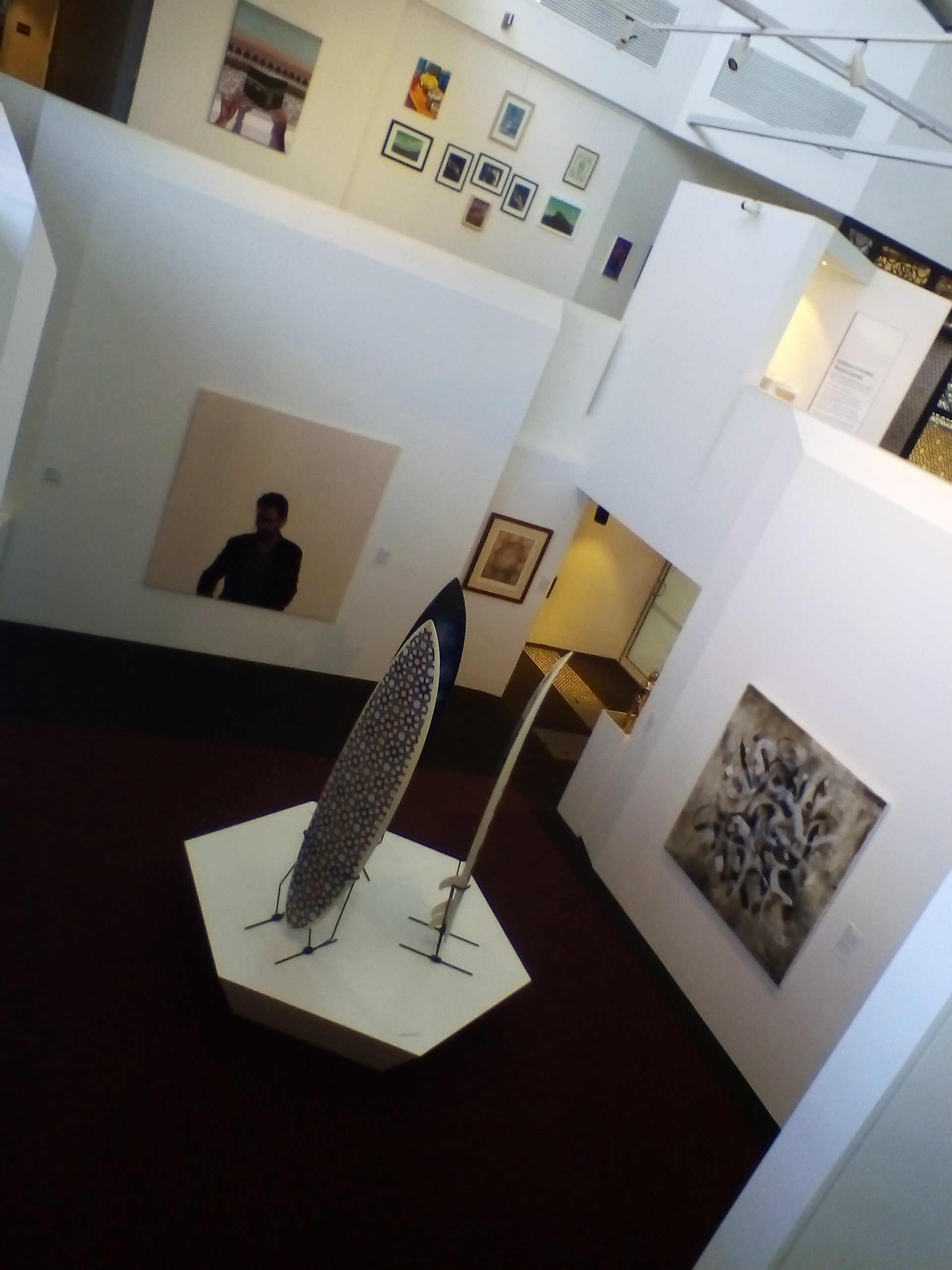
Islamic Art exhibit area

The Islamic Museum of Australia (IMA) is a community museum in Thornbury, Melbourne, Australia. It began as a not-for-profit foundation founded in May 2010 with the purpose of establishing the first Islamic museum in Australia. It aims to showcase the artistic heritage and historical contributions of Muslims in Australia and abroad through the display of artworks and historical artefacts.

== History ==
Designed by desypher, a Melbourne-based architectural firm, the $10 million museum was opened on 28 February 2014 by the Australian treasurer Joe Hockey. It shared a $4 million grant from the Government of Victoria's multicultural facilities program. The museum was established by Moustafa Fahour, who is director of the museum and Maysaa Fahour, with his brother Ahmed Fahour (CEO of Australia Post) and family contributing $4 million, early in 2014, to the IMA.

== Architecture and siting ==
The unique architectural style features a rusted Corten Steel facade representing the Australian outback, wrapped a white cube covered in geometric tilework with Arabic calligraphy.

The site backs onto Merri Creek, near the border of Thornbury and Brunswick East, two of Melbourne's well-established multicultural suburbs.

== Description ==
The IMA is the first centre of its kind in Australia to showcase a diverse range of Islamic arts including architecture, calligraphy, paintings, glass, ceramics and textiles. The museum also aims to promote new and established Islamic artists, both local and international. The Temoporary Gallery has hosted exhibitions such as Mush by Sydney based Blake Prize-winning artist Khaled Sabsabi, and Borderlands: Islamic design covered surfboards by Sydney-based artist Phillip George.

The permanent art gallery contains many unique works, including a 2011 Archibald Prize shortlisted portrait of Waleed Aly. The effort to establish this purpose-built Islamic Museum was geared towards sharing the artistic and historical achievements of Muslims internationally, and particularly in Australia. The Australian Muslim History gallery focuses on the history of Afghan cameleers, Malay pearlers, Albanian farmers and others. This was documented in the book and documentary, Boundless Plains, produced by the IMA based on a 2011 expedition unearthing unique Muslim stories from outback Australia.

The Museum's Modern Middle Eastern Cafe is run by Masterchef Australia 2013 Top 3 finalist Samira El-Khafir, who is Fahour's sister.

== Recognition and criticism ==
The Islamic Museum of Australia's permanent exhibition was Highly Commended in the 2014 Museums Australia MAGNA awards, endorsed as: "An important new museum which sensitively interconnects Australia's Muslim heritage with strong interpretive themes".

Yassir Morsi, from the International Centre for Muslim and Non-Muslim Understanding at the University of South Australia, in his review lists a number of deficiencies, saying the museum displays "how European we are when we colonise our Islamic history". He says the museum's only saving grace is the large oil painting of Waleed Aly.

== Sponsorship and governance ==
Etihad Airways and Dubai-based Habtoor Leighton Group are principal partners, while the museum branding was completed by Design 55 - a Dubai based studio. Gallery One from the Jumeirah Beach Residence Dubai, supplies the museum's gift store. The museum has a major UAE influence.

The federal government contributed $1.5 million towards the IMA in the 2012-13 budget. The Australian Labor Party promised to contribute a further $3 million during its unsuccessful re-election campaign in 2013.

In February 2015 the Saudi Government contributed $1 million towards the IMA. In March of that year the federal government allocated $500,000 and the state government pledged $450,000 for an arts and culture education program which will be developed by the IMA.

== AMA exhibition and art prize ==
The Australian Muslim Artists launched in 2018, as an annual non-acquisitive exhibition featuring the work of emerging and established Australian Muslim artists. AMA is also a database of artists and art professionals intended as a networking tool for both local and international artists. Following the establishment of the AMA Art Prize in 2019, the exhibition includes only shortlisted entries for the prize. In 2021 the AMA exhibition is available for viewing online.

The Australian Muslim Artists Art Prize was established in 2019, with the prize initially (until 2020) worth A$15,000, as an annual acquisitive art prize hosted by IMA in collaboration with sponsor La Trobe University. As of 2021 the award is worth A$10,000. The prize is open "to any Australian artist whose work is influenced by Islamic art or Muslim identity". The winning work is added to the university's collection managed by La Trobe Art Institute.

The partnership with La Trobe includes possibilities such as the university providing training in Islamic cultures for teachers, adding a new component to journalism courses and "work-integrated learning opportunities".

=== Winners ===
- 2019: Abdul Abdullah, for an embroidery entitled You can call me troublesome
  - Future Australian Muslim Artists category (for students in years 10–12): Hashim Mohamed
- 2020: Abdul-Rahman Abdullah, for Transplants (Euphorbia, Monstera, Sansevieria)
- 2021: Fatima Killeen, for her collagraph print on paper, The Crooked Narrative
- 2023: Rubaba Haider for a thread-like painting, Behind the veil of each night, there is a smiling dawn (Khalil Gibran) IV

== See also ==
- List of Islamic art museums
- Islamic organisations in Australia
