= Duncan Robinson (art historian) =

British academic and curator (1943–2022)

Duncan Robinson CBE DL FSA
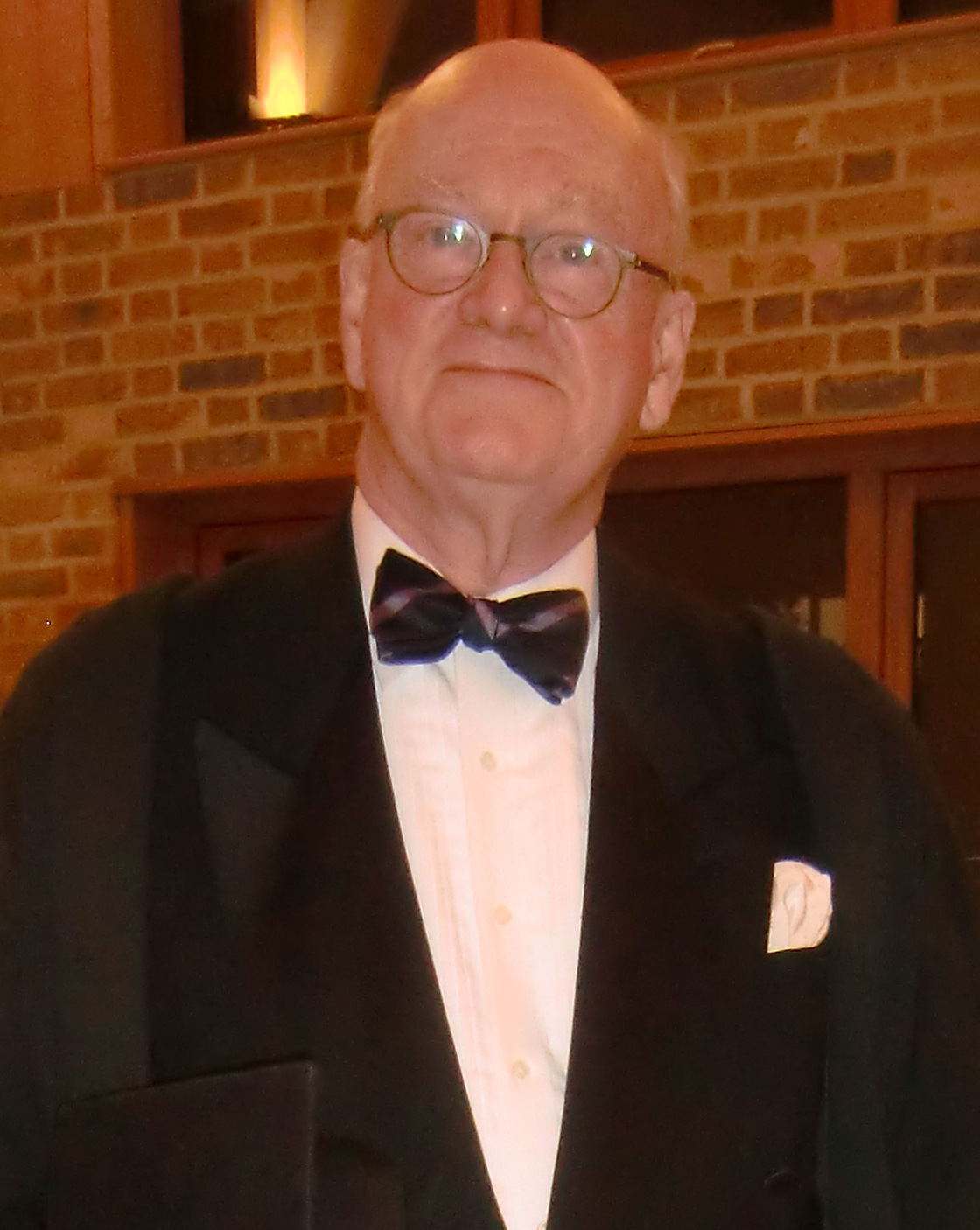
- Robinson in 2010

Master of Magdalene College, Cambridge
- In office 2002–2012
- Preceded by: Sir John Gurdon
- Succeeded by: Rowan Williams

Director of Fitzwilliam Museum
- In office 1995–2007
- Preceded by: Simon Swynfen Jervis
- Succeeded by: Timothy Potts

Personal details
- Born: David Duncan Robinson; 27 June 1943 Kidsgrove, Staffordshire, England
- Died: 2 December 2022 (aged 79)
- Spouse: Elizabeth Anne (m. 1967)
- Children: Three
- Parents: Tom H. Robinson; Ann E. Clark
- Education: Clare College, Cambridge; Yale University
- Motto: Utile Dulci
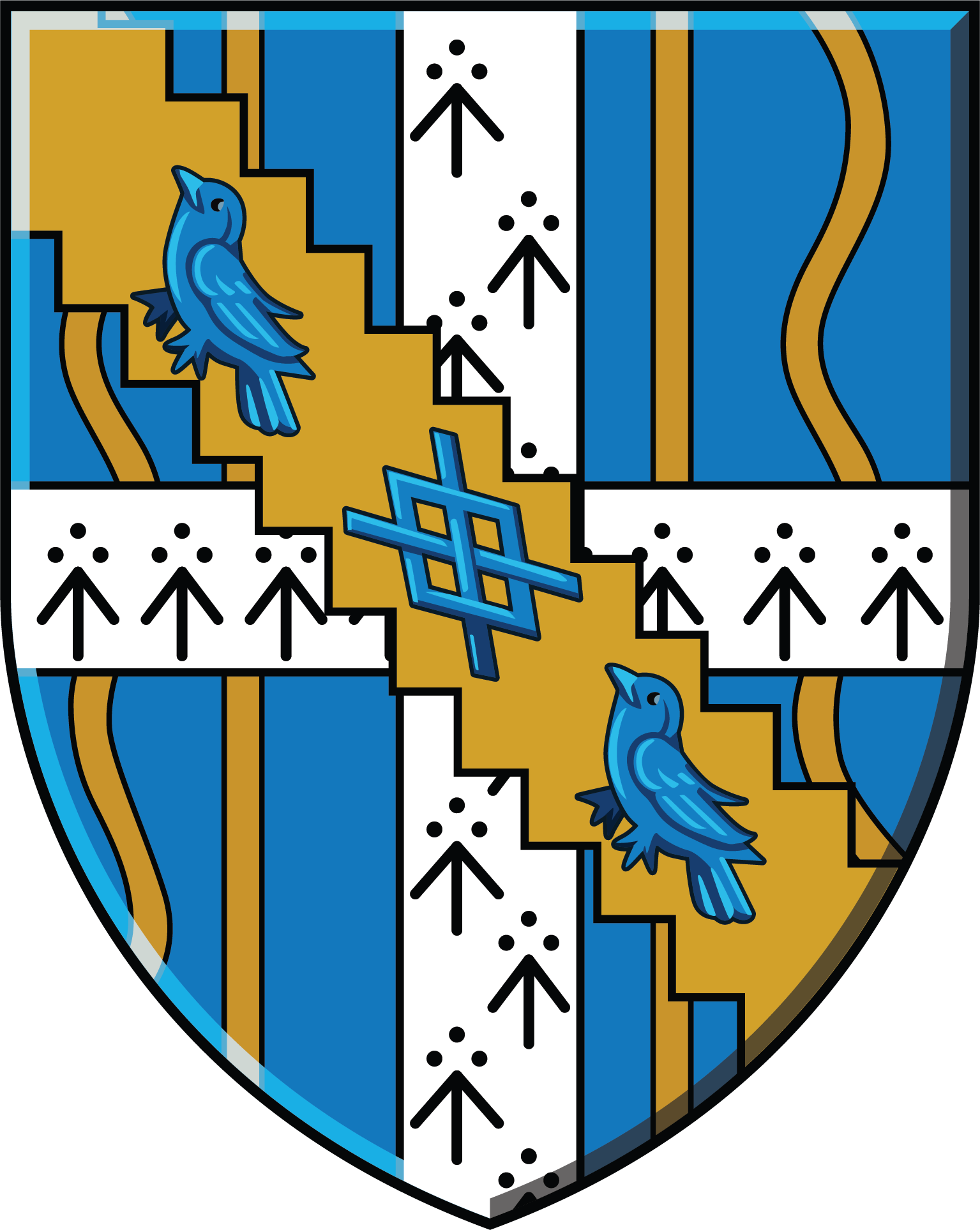
- Coat of arms

David Duncan Robinson, CBE, DL, FSA (27 June 1943 – 2 December 2022) was a British art historian and academic. He was the director of the Fitzwilliam Museum from 1995 to 2007 and the Master of Magdalene College, Cambridge, from 2002 to 2012.

== Early life and education ==
Robinson was born on 27 June 1943 in Kidsgrove, Staffordshire. He was an only child. He was educated at The King's School, Macclesfield; Clare College, Cambridge; and Yale University.

== Academic career ==
Robinson was a leading authority on British art from the eighteenth century onwards. He began his career as an assistant keeper in the Department of Paintings and Drawings at Fitzwilliam Museum, Cambridge, between 1970 and 1976. In 1976, he was appointed Keeper of Paintings and Drawings. From 1975 to 1981, he was additionally a Fellow of Clare College, Cambridge and a college lecturer.

From 1981 to 1995, Robinson was Director of the Yale Center for British Art and an adjunct professor of art history at Yale University. During this time, he was additionally Chief Executive of the Paul Mellon Centre for Studies in British Art in London.

Robinson joined the Fitzwilliam Museum as its director in 1995 upon returning to the United Kingdom from Yale. He resumed teaching at Cambridge and was elected into a professorial fellowship at Clare College. He retired as director of the Fitzwilliam Museum in 2007 in order to devote more time to Magdalene College, his research and his teaching.

In 2002, Robinson was appointed Master of Magdalene College following the retirement of Sir John Gurdon. In 2005 he was appointed a deputy vice-chancellor of the University of Cambridge. Unusually for a head of house, he remained the director of studies for both of 'his' colleges: Magdalene and Clare. He served as master until the end of 2012; on 1 January 2013, Rowan Williams took up the role. He was made an honorary fellow of Magdalene upon the end of his term as master.

Robinson was a trustee of the Royal Collection. He also served as the chairman of the Henry Moore Foundation in the 2010s.

== Personal life and death ==
In 1967, Robinson married Elizabeth Anne Sutton. Together they had three children: one son and two daughters.

Robinson died on 2 December 2022, at the age of 79.

== Honours ==
Robinson was appointed Commander of the Order of the British Empire (CBE) in the 2008 Birthday Honours for services to the heritage of art. He was also a deputy lieutenant of the County of Cambridgeshire.

== Selected works ==
- Stanley Spencer (Phaidon Press, 1993)
- The Yale Center for British Art: A Tribute to the Genius of Louis Kahn (with David Finn) (Yale University Press, 1997)
- Paul Mellon, A Cambridge Tribute (Fitzwilliam Museum Enterprises, 2007)

Academic offices
Preceded by Sir John Gurdon	Master of Magdalene College, Cambridge; 2002–2012	Succeeded by Rowan Williams
