= Brian Kennedy (gallery director) =

Irish art gallery director

Former Director of the Peabody Essex Museum
- Incumbent
- Assumed office 2019

Director of the Toledo Museum of Art
- In office 2010–2019

Director of the Hood Museum of Art
- In office 2004–2010

Personal details
- Born: Brian Patrick Kennedy; 5 November 1961 (age 65)
- Spouse: Mary Fiona Carlin (m. 1988)
- Education: University College Dublin
- Occupation: Museum Director

Brian Patrick Kennedy (born 5 November 1961) is an Irish-born art museum director who has worked in Ireland and Australia, and now lives and works in the United States. He was the director of the Peabody Essex Museum in Salem for 17 months, resigning December 31, 2020. He was the director of the Toledo Museum of Art in Ohio from 2010 to 2019. He was the director of the Hood Museum of Art from 2005 to 2010, and the National Gallery of Australia (Canberra) from 1997 to 2004.

== Career ==
Brian Kennedy currently lives and works in the United States after leaving Australia in 2005 to direct the Hood Museum of Art at Dartmouth College. In October 2010 he became the ninth Director of the Toledo Museum of Art. On 1 July 2019, he succeeded Dan Monroe as the executive director and CEO of the Peabody Essex Museum.

=== Early life and career in Ireland ===
Kennedy was born in Dublin and attended Clonkeen College. He received B.A. (1982), M.A. (1985) and PhD (1989) degrees from University College-Dublin, where he studied both art history and history.

He worked in the Irish Department of Education (1982), the European Commission, Brussels (1983), and in Ireland at the Chester Beatty Library (1983–85), Government Publications Office (1985–86), and Department of Finance (1986–89). He married Mary Fiona Carlin in 1988.

He was Assistant Director at the National Gallery of Ireland in Dublin from 1989 to 1997. He was Chair of the Irish Association of Art Historians from 1996 to 1997, and of the Council of Australian Art Museum Directors from 2001 to 2003. In September 1997 he became Director of the National Gallery of Australia.

=== National Gallery of Australia (NGA) ===
Kennedy expanded the traveling exhibitions and loans program throughout Australia, arranged for several major shows of Australian art abroad, increased the number of exhibitions at the museum itself and oversaw the development of an extensive multi-media site. Although he oversaw several years of the museum's highest ever annual visitation, he discontinued the emphasis of his predecessor, Betty Churcher, on showing "blockbuster" exhibitions.

During his directorship, the NGA gained government support for improving the building and significant private donations and corporate sponsorship. However, the initial design for the building proved controversial generating a public dispute with the original architect on moral rights grounds. As a result, the project was not delivered during Dr Kennedy's tenure, with a significantly altered design completed some years later. Private funding supported two acquisitions of British art, including David Hockney's A Bigger Grand Canyon in 1999, and Lucian Freud's After Cézanne in 2001. Kennedy built on the established collections at the museum by acquiring the Holmgren-Spertus collection of Indonesian textiles; the Kenneth Tyler collection of editioned prints, screens, multiples and unique proofs; and the Australian Print Workshop Archive. He was also notable for campaigning for the construction of a new "front" entrance to the Gallery, facing King Edward Terrace, which was completed in 2010 (see reference to the building project above).

Kennedy's cancellation of the "Sensation exhibition" (scheduled at the NGA from 2 June 2000 to 13 August 2000) was controversial, and seen by some as censorship. He claimed that the decision was due to the exhibition being "too close to the market" implying that a national cultural institution cannot exhibit the private collection of a speculative art investor. However, there were other exhibitions at the NGA during his tenure, which could have raised similar concerns. The exhibition featured the privately owned Young British Artists works belonging to Charles Saatchi and attracted large attendances in London and Brooklyn. Its most controversial work was Chris Ofili's The Holy Virgin Mary, a painting which used elephant dung and was accused of being blasphemous. The then-mayor of New York, Rudolph Giuliani, campaigned against the exhibition, claiming it was "Catholic-bashing" and an "aggressive, vicious, disgusting attack on religion." In November 1999, Kennedy cancelled the exhibition and stated that the events in New York had "obscured discussion of the artistic merit of the works of art". He has said that it "was the toughest decision of my professional life, so far."

Kennedy was also repeatedly questioned on his management of a range of issues during the Australian Government's Senate Estimates process - particularly on the NGA's occupational health and safety record and concerns about the NGA's twenty-year-old air-conditioning system. The air-conditioning was finally renovated in 2003. Kennedy announced in 2002 that he would not seek extension of his contract beyond 2004, accepting a seven-year term as had his two predecessors.

He became a joint Irish-Australian citizen in 2003.

=== Toledo Museum of Art ===
The Toledo Museum of Art is known for its exceptional collections of European and American paintings and sculpture, glass, antiquities, artist books, Japanese prints and netsuke. The museum offers free admission and is recognized for its historical leadership in the field of art education. During his tenure, Kennedy has focused the museum's art education efforts on visual literacy, which he defines as "learning to read, understand and write visual language." Initiatives have included baby and toddler tours, specialized training for all staff, docents, volunteers and the launch of a website, www.vislit.org. In November 2014, the museum hosted the International Visual Literacy Association (IVLA) conference, the first Museum to do so. Kennedy has been a frequent speaker on the topic, including 2010 and 2013 TEDx talks on visual and sensory literacy.

Kennedy has expressed an interest in expanding the museum's collection of contemporary art and art by indigenous peoples. Works by Frank Stella, Sean Scully, Jaume Plensa, Ravinder Reddy and Mary Sibande have been acquired. In addition, the museum has made major acquisitions of Old Master paintings by Frans Hals and Luca Giordano.

During his tenure the Toledo Museum of Art has announced the return of several objects from its collection due to claims the objects were stolen and/or illegally exported prior being sold to the museum. In 2011 a Meissen sweetmeat stand was returned to Germany followed by an Etruscan Kalpis or water jug to Italy (2013), an Indian sculpture of Ganesha (2014) and an astrological compendium to Germany in 2015.

=== Hood Museum of Art ===
Kennedy became Director of the Hood Museum of Art in July 2005. During his tenure, he implemented a series of large and small-scale exhibitions and oversaw the production of more than 20 publications to bring greater public attention to the museum's remarkable collections of the arts of America, Europe, Africa, Papua New Guinea and the Polar regions. At 70,000 objects, the Hood has one of the largest collections on any American college of university campus. The exhibition, Black Womanhood: Images, Icons, and Ideologies of the African Body, toured several US venues. Kennedy increased campus curricular use of works of art, with thousands of objects pulled from storage for classes annually. Numerous acquisitions were made with the museum's generous endowments, and he curated several exhibitions: including Wenda Gu: Forest of Stone Steles: Retranslation and Rewriting Tang Dynasty Poetry, Sean Scully: The Art of the Stripe, and Frank Stella: Irregular Polygons.

== Publications ==
Kennedy has written or edited a number of books on art, including:

- Alfred Chester Beatty and Ireland 1950-1968: A study in cultural politics, Glendale Press (1988), ISBN 978-0-907606-49-9
- Dreams and responsibilities: The state and arts in independent Ireland, Arts Council of Ireland (1990), ISBN 978-0-906627-32-7
- Jack B Yeats: Jack Butler Yeats, 1871-1957 (Lives of Irish Artists), Unipub (October 1991), ISBN 978-0-948524-24-0
- The Anatomy Lesson: Art and Medicine (with Davis Coakley), National Gallery of Ireland (January 1992), ISBN 978-0-903162-65-4
- Ireland: Art into History (with Raymond Gillespie), Roberts Rinehart Publishers (1994), ISBN 978-1-57098-005-3
- Irish Painting, Roberts Rinehart Publishers (November 1997), ISBN 978-1-86059-059-7
- Sean Scully: The Art of the Stripe, Hood Museum of Art (October 2008), ISBN 978-0-944722-34-3
- Frank Stella: Irregular Polygons, 1965-1966, Hood Museum of Art (October 2010), ISBN 978-0-944722-39-8

== Honors and achievements ==
Kennedy was awarded the Australian Centenary Medal in 2001 for service to Australian Society and its art. He is a trustee and treasurer of the Association of Art Museum Directors, a peer reviewer for the American Association of Museums and a member of the International Association of Art Critics. In 2013 he was appointed inaugural eminent professor at the University of Toledo and received an honorary doctorate from Lourdes University. Most recently, Kennedy received the 2014 Northwest Region, Ohio Art Education Association award for distinguished educator for art education.

== Notes ==
Cultural offices
Preceded by Betty Churcher	Director of the National Gallery of Australia; 1997–2004	Succeeded by Ron Radford
