= ArtExpress =

Art exhibition in New South Wales, Australia

ARTEXPRESS, also written ArtExpress, is an art exhibition which is a showcase of Higher School Certificate Visual Arts Examination artworks from across New South Wales, Australia.

== History ==
ArtExpress began in the late 1950s in Sydney, exhibiting at the Art Gallery of NSW since 1983.

During the COVID-19 pandemic in Australia (2020–2021), ArtExpress put its exhibitions online.

== Description ==
It is a partnership between the NSW Education Standards Authority and NSW Department of Education in association with the Art Gallery of New South Wales. It began in the late 1950s in Sydney, exhibiting at the Art Gallery of NSW since 1983.

Whilst usually perceived as an exhibition of "the best" artworks, this is not necessarily true as the chosen artworks are merely representative of the broad diversity of different artworks submitted for that year's HSC. Although students are not so restricted in the works that are produced for the HSC, ARTEXPRESS works must have a "G" rating.

ARTEXPRESS occurs annually in the Art Gallery of New South Wales, Sydney Olympic Park and ten other art galleries in New South Wales. The works selected for ArtExpress reflect trends in the galleries who select the works, therefore they may not represent the exemplar works from the Visual Arts Examination, but the needs of the gallery showing the work. Works selected may reflect trends in cost cutting, so less complex works with fewer components and often less challenging (or engaging) works for the audience are given focus.

== Past exhibitors ==
- McLean Edwards (1990)
- Melissa Chiu (1990)
- Ben Quilty (1992)
- David Griggs (1994)
- Jasper Knight (1996)
