= Catherine Hunter (filmmaker) =

Australian journalist and television

Catherine Hunter is an Australian filmmaker, journalist, television producer and director.

Hunter joined the Nine Network's Sunday program in 1985. After two decades of producing documentary-length cover stories on the arts, she left the program in 2006 to work as a freelance documentary maker, specialising in films about Australian artists. Most of her independent films have been broadcast on ABC TV.

In addition to her broadcast documentaries, Hunter has contributed commissioned films for the Art Gallery of New South Wales, National Gallery of Victoria, Art Gallery of South Australia, National Gallery of Australia, QAGOMA, William Robinson Gallery, Bathurst Regional Art Gallery and the National Portrait Gallery, in conjunction with exhibitions of Australian and international artists, including Anselm Kiefer. In 2006 she received a Commendation in the Walkley Awards for Journalism for her profile on architect Peter Stutchbury and in the same year won the Australian Institute of Architects prize for architectural journalism.

In 2009 Hunter's documentary on Sidney Nolan examined the influences of his relationships with the three women who shaped his life.

Hunter visited Jeffrey Smart at his farmhouse in Tuscany while filming her documentary on the great Australian painter, and he takes the film crew to some of the places near Arezzo that have long inspired him, the concrete streetscapes and urban wastelands that define his vision.

Hunter's method is to spend time filming with her subjects at times of great personal and professional significance, often over a period of many years. In 2010 she returned to the subject of an earlier film, Margaret Olley, following the artist as she completed her last works, painted in the 18 months leading up to her death on 26 July 2011. In early 2012 Hunter was with artist Jenny Sages as she dealt with the death of her husband Jack and produced the grieving self-portrait that would cause such a sensation at the Archibald Prize.

In 2016, Hunter directed Glenn Murcutt: Spirit of Place, a documentary about Australian architect Glenn Murcutt. The film follows Murcutt's work on a mosque for the Newport Islamic community in Melbourne and examines his architectural career.

In 2019, Hunter directed Quilty: Painting the Shadows, a documentary about Australian artist Ben Quilty. The film examines Quilty's artistic practice, including his creation of a painting responding to the 1838 Myall Creek massacre. The documentary premiered at the Brisbane International Film Festival in October 2019.

Australian artist Ben Quilty gave Hunter unprecedented access to his intimate process over more than a decade, exploring the journey that led him to the battlefields of Afghanistan as Australia's official war artist. Hunter followed the artist as he completed one of his most challenging art works, an exploration of the Myall Creek massacre. In October 2019 the film screened to sold out sessions at the Brisbane International Film Festival. The film has been lauded by critics with one reviewer noting that “director Catherine Hunter creates an open door into a world of great artists that is unavailable to most of us. Hunter has crafted a film that is engrossing from the start but that builds to something more emotionally encompassing when Quilty's final painting is revealed.”

== Filmography ==
- Anselm Kiefer: Aperiatur terra (2007)
- China's Avant-Garde: The New Cultural Revolution (2009)
- Glenn Murcutt: Architecture for Place (2009)
- Sidney Nolan: Mask and Memory (2009)
- Nicholas Harding - Drawn from Life (2010)
- Inland Heart: The Photography of Jeff Carter (2010)
- Wendy Sharpe: The Imagined Life (2010)
- Jenny Sages: Paths to Portraiture (2010)
- Roger Law: A Law Unto Himself (2011)
- Margaret Olley: A Life In Paint (2012)
- William Robinson: A Painter's Journey (2012)
- Jeffrey Smart: Master of Stillness (2012)
- Savannah Country: The Art of Julie Poulsen and Jenny Valmadre (2012)
- The Holtermann Legacy (2013)
- TarraWarra Museum of Art: An Enduring Passion (2013)
- Cox Architecture: Transitions in Landscape (2014)
- Trent Parke: The Black Rose (2015). Includes Trent Parke, Narelle Autio and Geoff Dyer.
- Robert Brain - An Autobiographical Tapestry (2016)
- Glenn Murcutt: Spirit of Place (2016)
- Stanley Spencer (2016)
- Mandy Martin - Homeground (2016)
- Rachel Ellis: Sustaining Light (2018)
- Harrie Fasher - The Last Charge (2018)
- Universal Principles - Australia Now (2018)
- Australia's Lost Impressionist: John Russell (2018)
- Wendy Sharpe - Wanderlust (2019)
- Arthur Boyd - Landscape of the Soul (2019)
- The Heysen Legacy (2019)
- William Robinson - Elixir of Light (2019)
- Quilty: Painting the Shadows (2019)
- Adrienne Doig: It's All About Me (2020)
- Streeton: A Life (2020)
- Justin O'Brien - The Sacred Music of Colour (2020)
- Wendy Sharpe - Ghosts (2021)
- Chester Nealie - Etched in Fire (2021)
- Rhyl Hinwood - A Legacy in Stone (2021)
- Bronwyn Oliver - The Shadows Within (2021)
- The Cobar Sound Chapel (2021)
- Lucy Culliton - Cambalong Creek (2021)
- Luke Sciberras - Side of the Sky (2022)
- Joe Furlonger - Landscape Dreamer (2022)
- Jeffrey Smart (2022)
- Liam Benson - Virtue without Stain (2022)
- Radiance - The Art of Elisabeth Cummings (2023)
- Danelle Bergstrom - Layered Landscapes" (2023)
