= Ron Radford =

Ron Radford AM

Director of the National Gallery of Australia
- In office 20 December 2004 – 30 September 2014
- Preceded by: Brian Kennedy
- Succeeded by: Gerard Vaughan

Personal details
- Born: Ronald Warwick Radford; 1949 (age 76–77) Warragul, Australia
- Education: University of Melbourne; RMIT University
- Occupation: Curator

Ronald Warwick Radford AM is an Australian curator, who was the director of the National Gallery of Australia (NGA) from 2004 until 2014. He was previously the Director of the Art Gallery of South Australia in Adelaide.

== Early life and education ==
Ronald Warwick Radford was born in Warragul, Victoria, Australia, in 1949. He attended Scotch College, Melbourne, and then the University of Melbourne and RMIT University.

In 2006, he was awarded Doctor of Letters (D.Litt.) by the University of Adelaide for the entirety of books, booklets, articles, and catalogues authored or edited by him during his career as an art curator and gallery director up to that point.

== Career ==
He was an education officer at the National Gallery of Victoria in 1971 and 1972. He was director of the Ballarat Fine Art Gallery from 1973 to 1980, a position previously held by the founding director of the NGA, James Mollison.

From 1980 to 1988 he was curator of European and Australian Paintings and Sculpture at the Art Gallery of South Australia. As director between 1990 and 2004, he built up the collection of Australian art, particularly from the Colonial period, developed a strong holding in Asian art and expanded the Renaissance collection.

Radford was appointed director of the NGA in 2004, his term starting on 20 December. He announced his intention to lend out Old Masters (European art, prior to the 19th century) for long-term display to state galleries. He considers the collection of less than 30 paintings, put together by Mollison to give context to the modern collection, as too small to make any impact on the public. He has been quoted as saying that the gallery should concentrate on its strengths—European Art of the first half of the 20th century, 20th-century American art, photography, Asian art and the 20th-century drawing collection, and to fill the gaps in the Australian collection.

He retired in September 2014.

== Other activities ==
Radford served on many boards and committees, including the Australia Council (chairing its Visual Arts/Craft Board from 1997 to 2002). He was a founding member of the National Portrait Gallery's board from 1997 to 2005.

In 2012, he was a trustee of the Gordon Darling Foundation, a member of the Board of Art Exhibitions Australia, a director of the Bundanon Trust, and a member of the Australia International Cultural Council. He was also an affiliate professor of the University of Adelaide.

== Recognition and honours ==
Radford was awarded a Churchill Fellowship as well as other fellowships to the Yale Center for British Art and the Huntington Library in San Marino, California.

The historic Ordnance Store building at AGSA, now an historical museum for the display of early South Australian paintings and objects, was later renamed the Radford Auditorium.

Other honours awarded to Radford include:

- 2001: Centenary Medal
- 2003: Member of the Order of Australia
- 2007: Honorary doctorate, University of Adelaide
- 2009: Chevalier de l'Ordre des Arts et des Lettres, for his contributions to the arts
- 2012?: Honorary doctorate, University of South Australia, "in recognition of his significant contributions to the art community in South Australia and nationally"
- 2015: Honorary doctorate, University of Canberra, "for service to arts administration, particularly as Director of the National Gallery of Australia and by initiating appreciation of Australian artists and their work within the community"

== Publications ==
Radford has written a number of books on art, mainly exhibition guides, including:

- Recent Aboriginal Painting incorporating the Maude Vizard-Wholohan Prize Purchase Awards 1988, Art Gallery of South Australia (1988), ISBN 0-7308-0799-1
- Tom Roberts, Art Gallery of South Australia (1996)
- The William Bowmore Collection: The Fine Art of Giving, Art Gallery of South Australia (1999), ISBN 0-7308-3059-4
- Our Country: Australian Federation Landscapes 1900-1914, Art Gallery of South Australia (2001)
- 19th Century Australian Art - M.J.M. Carter Collection, Art Gallery of South Australia (1993), ISBN 0-7308-3008-X

== Notes ==
Cultural offices
Preceded by Brian Kennedy	Director of the National Gallery of Australia; 2004–2014	Succeeded by Gerard Vaughan
