= Abdul-Rahman Abdullah =

Australian artist (born 1977)

Abdul-Rahman Abdullah (born 1977) is an Australian artist based in Western Australia, an elder brother of artist Abdul Abdullah. He works mainly in sculpture and installations.

== Early life and education ==
Abdul-Rahman Abdullah was born in 1977 at Port Kembla, New South Wales. He is an elder brother of Abdul Abdullah (born 1986) Their mother is Malay, while their father is Anglo-Australian, and the family is Muslim. Abdullah is a 7th-generation Australian on his father's side, whose ancestors arrived on the Indefatigable (a convict ship) in 1815. Both of his grandfathers fought in the Second World War.

After school he worked at a variety of jobs, as well as enrolling in and dropping out of various college and university courses, before he realised that art could be a profession. He enjoyed drawing, and became an illustrator and commercial sculptor, developing skills and a work ethic as an independent contractor.

In 2010, Abdullah enrolled for an art degree at the Victorian College of Arts in Melbourne, but switched institutions before graduating from Curtin University in Perth in 2012, when he was 34 years old.

== Career ==
Abdullah became a full-time artist a year after completing his degree, when he secured commission to create a public artwork. In 2014 he started carving wood for the first time, having been using clay, moulds, silicone and resins following his experience of sculpting commercially.

In 2018, Abdullah co-curated (with Nur Shkembi), an exhibition called Waqt al-tagheer: Time of change at ACE Open, Adelaide as part of the Adelaide Festival, showcasing the work of 11 Muslim artists who explore their identity in their work. The work included Hoda Afshar's photographic series, Westoxicated; several works by his brother Abdul Abdullah; Abdullah's sculptural installation 500 Books; and works by others including Khadim Ali, Shireen Taweel, Eugenia Flynn, Zeina Iaali and Khaled Sabsabi.

== Art practice and themes ==
Abdullah is acutely aware of his identity as a Muslim and being seen as foreigner in Australia because of his religion. He said in 2020:

I appreciate that I live in a privileged part of the world, yet it's also a deeply belligerent, inherently bigoted and selfish country that continues to destroy the environment for profit, imprison asylum seekers and is unable to acknowledge the colonial framework of violence that still defines us. Australians have this self image of being relaxed and easy going but we are consumed by institutional racism, government corruption and hard-edged politics.

He draws inspiration from his family, immediate and extended, as well as ancestors in Malaysia and Indonesia, and also explores the idea of family and its different definitions. Animals feature strongly in his work, which he says is "fundamental to my visual language". He carves wooden animals in a style which he calls "aestheticised realism" which is "realistic in terms of proportion and scale, but simplified and stylised". Others have referred to it as magic realism; he explores traditional methods in a contemporary way. He uses animals as symbols of human stories and relationships, and also explores the idea of memory in his work.

On the occasion of the 2022 exhibition Land Abounds, featuring work of both Abdullah brothers and video works by Tracey Moffatt, Abdul-Rahman said:

We overlap in so many different ways, and our work is like an ongoing conversation we're having about the worlds we're experiencing. Tracey Moffatt is an iconic figure to both of us. She holds a mirror up to a social landscape that we all understand, exposing the dynamics of power that we consume and enact. The ways in which our works engage and respond to each other creates a multi-layered dialogue that always seems to come back to ideas of perception and power. What dictates our perceptions of the world, how are we perceived and how do we participate in that equation with autonomy.

== Other roles ==
- 2017–2021: Board member of Perth Institute of Contemporary Arts
- 2018: City of Perth, East End revitalisation working group

== Recognition ==
In 2018 both brothers were shortlisted to represent Australia in the 58th Venice Biennale in 2019.

Abdullah was selected to exhibit in the 2016 Adelaide Biennial, and has again been selected for 2022, as one of "25 leading Australian contemporary artists".

=== Residencies ===
- 2013: Underbelly Arts Lab, Cockatoo Island, Sydney
- 2014: Campbelltown Arts Centre, Sydney
- 2015: Galeri Petronas, Kuala Lumpur, Malaysia
- 2016: 4A Beijing Residency, Beijing, China

=== Selected awards and other honours ===
Abdullah has been shortlisted for the Wynne Prize twice (as of September 2021), the Blake Prize, and several other prizes; was highly commended for the Waterhouse Natural Science Art Prize; and has won a number of prizes for sculpture.

In 2020, Abdullah won the Australian Muslim Artists Art Prize, an annual prize hosted by La Trobe University, for his work entitled Transplants (Euphorbia, Monstera, Sansevieria), a tribute to his mother's love for her family and her expertise in horticulture.

In 2021, he won the Minnawarra Art Prize, a Western Australian prize.

== Exhibitions ==
Abdullah's first solo exhibition was in Perth in 2012, at an artist run initiative called Kurb, when he was a third-year student at Curtin, and sold his first artwork there.

His work has been exhibited at the Australian Centre for Contemporary Art in Melbourne. In 2014, The Obstacle, a life-size buffalo carved from jelutong wood, sunken into a Persian rug, featured at the Melbourne Art Fair.

In April 2015, the Art Gallery of Western Australia held the inaugural "WA Focus" exhibition featuring the work of both Abdul and Abdul-Rahman. Also in April 2015, Abdullah's work was featured in the Here&Now15 exhibition of experimental sculpture at Lawrence Wilson Art Gallery at the University of Western Australia. In 2015, work from both brothers featured at the mid-year salon exhibition at the Perth Institute of Contemporary Arts (PICA).

In 2019, his large-scale installation entitled Pretty Beach, featuring painted wooden stingrays and crystal rain, was included in The National, at the Art Gallery of New South Wales. This was inspired by the death by suicide in 2009 of his Grandpa Cliffy, reflecting the shore where he lived.

In 2020 he was working on a major group exhibition that had been postponed owing to the COVID-19 pandemic in Australia. Called I am a heart beating in the world: Diaspora Pavilion 2, it was planned to become part of an international project for the Venice Biennale. Presented by the 4A Centre for Contemporary Asian Art and the International Curators Forum in partnership with Campbelltown Arts Centre at Campbelltown, the exhibition was due to run from 22 May to 17 October 2021, but it had to go online after another wave of COVID-19 in New South Wales. Fellow contributors to the exhibition include Lindy Lee and Leyla Stevens.

In February 2021 Abdullah held his first solo exhibition in an institutional gallery, at the John Curtin Gallery in Perth. It was also his largest exhibition so far. Entitled Everything is true, the exhibition comprised 24 sculptures.

From 28 May until 24 July 2022, the exhibition Land Abounds, featuring the work of both Abdullah brothers and video work by Tracey Moffatt, runs at the NSW Southern Highlands gallery of Ngununggula (meaning "belonging" in the local Gundungurra language).

=== Solo exhibitions ===
As of September 2021, Abdullah has had the following solo exhibitions:

- 2012: Inside the little kingdom, Fringe World Festival 2012, Kurb Gallery. Perth
- 2013: Maghrib, Venn Gallery, Perth
- 2015: In the name, Alaska Projects, Sydney
- 2017: Among Monsters, This Is No Fantasy, Melbourne
- 2018: The Dogs, Moore Contemporary, Perth
- 2021: Everything is true, Perth Festival 2021, John Curtin Gallery, Perth

== Collections ==
Abdullah's work is held in several major and regional galleries, including:

- Artbank (national collection)
- Art Gallery of South Australia
- Art Gallery of Western Australia
- University of Western Australia
- Murdoch University
- La Trobe University
- Curtin University
- Islamic Museum of Australia
- City of Campbelltown
- City of Broken Hill
- City of Bendigo
- City of Armadale
- Wesfarmers

== Personal life ==
Abdullah lives with his wife, artist Anna Louise Richardson, their two daughters and newborn son on a large cattle farm in Mundijong, Western Australia. The couple alternate parenting and working in the studio.

His younger brother is artist Abdul Abdullah.
