= Gerard Vaughan (art historian) =

Australian art historian and gallery director

Gerard Vaughan AM FAHA

Director of the National Gallery of Australia
- In office 10 November 2014 – 2 July 2018
- Preceded by: Ron Radford
- Succeeded by: Nick Mitzevich

Director of the National Gallery of Victoria
- In office 29 July 1999 – 20 July 2012
- Preceded by: Timothy Potts
- Succeeded by: Tony Ellwood

Personal details
- Born: 27 September 1953 (age 73) Devonport, Tasmania, Australia
- Spouse: Rosemary Flanders (m. 1979)
- Children: 2
- Education: University of Melbourne; University of Oxford
- Occupation: Art historian, art museum director

Gerard Ronald Vaughan AM FAHA (born 27 September 1953) is an Australian art historian and curator. He was director of the National Gallery of Victoria from 1999 to 2012, and was director of the National Gallery of Australia from 2014 to 2018.

== Early life and education ==
Vaughan was born in Devonport, Tasmania, in 1953. He was educated in Melbourne at Christian Brothers College, St Kilda and the University of Melbourne where he graduated with a Bachelor of Arts with Honours and a Master of Arts, writing his thesis on French symbolist painter Maurice Denis.

== Oxford ==
In 1981, Vaughan undertook doctoral research at the University of Oxford on the collecting of Roman antiquities in 18th century England, concentrating on the collector and antiquary Charles Townley, in the context of neoclassical taste. He remained in England for eighteen years, holding several academic positions there as a visiting scholar, resident fellow at Wolfson College, London-based consultant for the Felton Bequest at the National Gallery of Victoria, and private secretary to the Vice-Chancellor of Oxford University, Sir Patrick Neill, and later, Sir Richard Southwood. In 1991, Vaughan was made deputy director of Campaign for Oxford, the university's fundraising appeal. In 1994, Vaughan was appointed inaugural Director of the British Museum Development Trust, with special responsibility for funding Norman Foster's Great Court.

== Australia ==
In 1999, Vaughan returned to Australia, where he was appointed director and CEO of the National Gallery of Victoria (NGV). At the NGV, he prioritised fundraising from the private sector, firstly for the NGV's 1999–2003 redevelopment program, including Mario Bellini's re-thinking of Sir Roy Grounds' 1960s principal building, and a new building for Australian art in nearby Federation Square, by Lab Partners. He also gave attention to the gallery's foundation, increasing its capital reserves from $9 million in 1999 to some $50 million in 2011, and funding major acquisitions. Vaughan elected a Fellow of the Australian Academy of the Humanities in 2007 and appointed a Member of the Order of Australia in the 2011 Australia Day Honours for services to the arts.

In 2014, Vaughan was announced as the new director of the National Gallery of Australia (NGA), replacing Ron Radford who had headed the gallery for ten years.

In September 2017, Vaughan announced his retirement, allowing the NGA a year to find his successor. In April 2018, it was announced that Nick Mitzevich, the director of the Art Gallery of South Australia, would take over at the start of July.

Vaughan appears in the 2019 documentary film D'art directed by Karl von Möller.

Cultural offices
| Preceded by Timothy Potts | Director of the National Gallery of Victoria; 1999–2012 | Succeeded by Tony Ellwood |
| Preceded by Ron Radford | Director of the National Gallery of Australia; 2014–2018 | Succeeded by Nick Mitzevich |
