= University of Queensland Art Museum =

Coordinates: 27.4965°S 153.0120°E

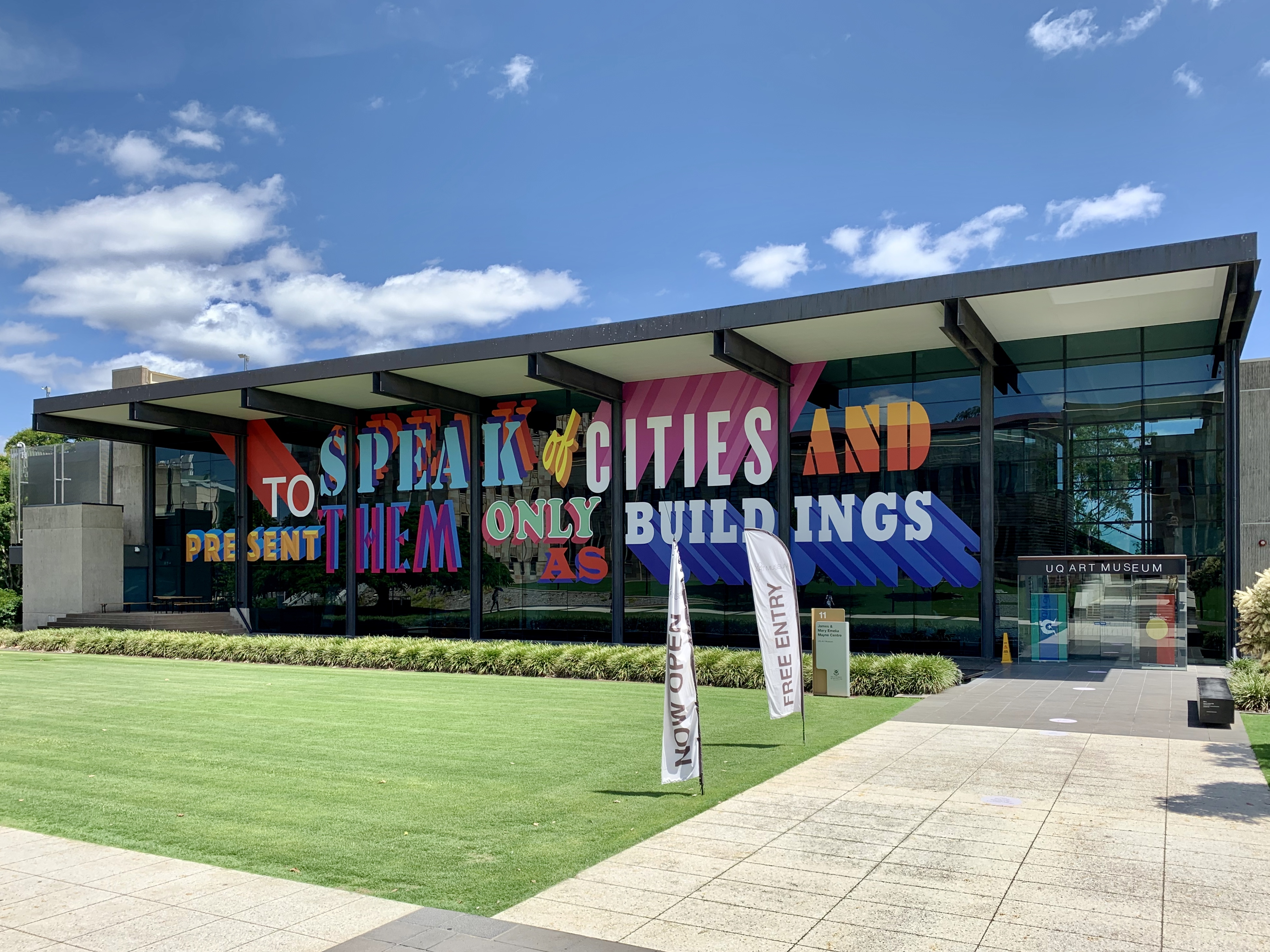
- University of Queensland Art Museum in 2020
- Former name: Darnell Collection, Mayne Hall
- Established: 1976, refurbished April 2004
- Location: University of Queensland; St Lucia Campus; James and Mary Emelia Mayne Centre (Building 11)
- Type: Art museum
- Collections: Australian artists from the colonial period to the present
- Collection size: 3,000 artworks
- Owner: University of Queensland
- Public transit access: UQ St Lucia ferry wharf Boggo Road railway station
- Website: artmuseum.uq.edu.au

The University of Queensland Art Museum (stylised as UQ Art Museum) is the art museum and public gallery of the University of Queensland in the James and Mary Emelia Mayne Centre at the St Lucia campus. The University of Queensland Art Collection is now the second largest public art collection in Queensland. The building was formerly known as Mayne Hall.

== History of the Art Museum ==
Originally known as the Darnell Collection, the University of Queensland Art Collection began in the 1940s as the result of a generous financial bequest by John Darnell. While funds were originally applied to endow a special library collection, the university redirected the remainder of these funds towards establishing a fine art library. At the time, the University of Queensland did not have an art museum, and the collection was hung in the main geology lab at the university's original home in George Street.

The inaugural exhibition of the collection was held in 1945 in George Street. Just over 30 years later, in 1976, the University Art Museum was established in the Forgan Smith Tower on the St Lucia campus. The first director of the art museum, and head of the Department of Fine Arts, was Nancy Underhill (later Associate Professor Underhill). Her focus was to acquire works by leading contemporary artists with a bias towards Queensland artists. Underhill was passionate about encouraging her students to use the museum as a "laboratory", enabling them to learn a range of curatorial skills. Underhill was succeeded in 1996 by Ross Searle, who oversaw the art museum's move in 2004, from the Forgan Smith Tower to its present site. Searle also implemented the art museum's development of a National Collection of Artists' Self Portraits and a bi-annual self-portraiture prize.

Over the years, the collection has grown significantly, and by the time Searle departed in 2007, it numbered over 2,500 pieces.

Nick Mitzevich was appointed director in July 2007, and stayed in the position for six years. The museum, under the directorship of Mitzevich and afterwards Campbell B Gray, continued to acquire the work of important Queensland and Australian contemporary artists, and to encourage gifts and bequests. As at June 2018, the museum had over 3,900 artworks. In keeping with its role as a university art museum, a range of exhibitions and public programs, and scholarly publications, are initiated, which explore contemporary and historical visual art and culture.

== History of the Mayne Hall complex ==
A Great Hall, similar to those which existed at universities in the UK was proposed for the St Lucia campus of the University of Queensland as far back as the 1940s. With funding from the federal government, donations from Myer and BP and a $20,000 donation from the UQ Alumni Association, work began in 1971 toward constructing what became known as Mayne Hall. It opened in March 1973. The building was commissioned by Sir Zelman Cowen, the Vice Chancellor and it was designed by Brisbane architect, Robin Gibson. Its name honoured the Mayne family who had contributed to the establishment of the University at St Lucia.

The building was designed to host graduation ceremonies, concerts by the Queensland University Musical Society and others, career fairs, lectures and orations as well as popular concerts.

A neo-classical organ was added to the building in the mid 1970s, with a design similar to a 1962 Schuke organ fitted in the Kaiser Wilhelm Memorial Church, Berlin. The organ was used as a teaching resource for two decades.

== Performers who played Mayne Hall ==
- Bo Diddley (1974 and 1975)
- Split Enz, (1976 and 1977)
- Richard Clapton Band (1976)
- Sonny Terry and Brownie McGhee
- Margaret RoadKnight
- Stephane Grappelli (1976)
- Alan Stivell (1977)
- Larry Norman (1977)
- Little River Band (1977)
- Cliff Richard (1978)
- Tom Waits (1979)
- Bruce Cockburn (1983)
- Michelle Shocked (1991)

In 1993, Mayne Hall was redeveloped by Wilson Architects to house the UQ Art Museum and exhibition space.

== See also ==
- University of Queensland
