= Tracey Moffatt =

Australian photographer (born 1960)

- Born: 12 November 1960 (age 65); Brisbane, Queensland, Australia
- Known for: Photography, film
- Notable work: Something more (1989)

Tracey Moffatt AO (born 12 November 1960) is an Indigenous Australian artist who primarily uses photography and video.

In 2017, she represented Australia at the 57th Venice Biennale with her solo exhibition, "My Horizon". Her works are held in the collections of the Tate, Museum of Contemporary Art, Los Angeles, National Gallery of Australia, Art Gallery of South Australia and Art Gallery of New South Wales.

She lives in Sydney and has previously resided in New York City.

Though she is best known for her photographic works, Moffatt has created numerous films, documentaries and videos. Her work often focuses on Australian Aboriginal people and the way they are understood in cultural and social terms.

== Early life and education ==
Moffatt was born in Brisbane in 1960 to a white father and an Aboriginal mother. At age three she was fostered out of her family, growing up as the eldest of three daughters in a white family and often left to look after her foster sisters.

In 2020, Moffatt was awarded an Honorary Fellowship of the Royal Photographic Society.

== Early works ==
Moffatt's first short film was Nice Coloured Girls, made in 1987. It is a 16-minute story of three young Aboriginal women as they cruise Sydney's King's Cross entertainment district looking for fun, presented in cut-away context with the historical oppression of Indigenous women by white men. Gail Mabo acted in this film, and also danced in and choreographed another of Moffatt's short films, Watch Out (1987). Commissioned by the Murray Art Museum Albury and shot in Link Studios in Wodonga, Something More (1989) is a photographic series composed of six vibrant Cibachrome colour prints and three black-and-white prints. It is a now iconic series of photographs that built Moffatt's first widespread public attention, each of which borrows from film language to construct what is described as "an enigmatic narrative of a young woman looking for more out of life than the circumstances of her violent rural upbringing." Night Cries (1989) is one of Moffatt's best-known films. Inspired by the 1955 classic Australian film Jedda, and sharing similar aesthetics to Something More, it tells the story of an Aboriginal woman forced to care for her ageing white mother.

== 1990s ==
Moffatt's photographic series Pet Thang (1991) and Laudanum (1998) returned to the themes of Something More exploring mixed and sometimes obscure references to issues of sexuality, history, representation and race. Other series of images, notably Scarred for Life (1994) and Scarred for Life II (1999) again tackled these themes but which referenced the photojournalism and photo essays of Life magazine accompanied by captions. While the words are compelling, they don't explain the images, indeed they tend to add to their enigmatic nature as though more information is a further dead end.

As her work progressed over the next decade, Moffatt began to explore narratives in more gothic settings. In Up in the Sky (1998) the artist's work again used a sequential narrative but instead of using fantasy settings, a story concerning Australia's "stolen generation" – Indigenous Australian children who were taken from their families and forcibly relocated under Government policy – was enacted and performed on location in Queensland's outback. Like Something More, Up in the sky employs the theme of race and violence, displaying a loose narrative set against the backdrop of a remote town, 'a place of ruin' and devastation populated by misfits and minor characters. It is one of Moffatt's larger series of photographs and takes its visual ideas from Italian modernist cinema Accattone (1961) by Pier Paolo Pasolini. The story relies on a triangular mixed-race relationship. Of this work Moffatt stated: 'My work is full of emotion and drama, you can get to that drama by using a narrative, and my narratives are usually very simple, but I twist it ... there is a storyline, but ... there isn't a traditional beginning, middle and end.'

In 1997 Moffatt held her "first substantial exhibition to date" which established her artistic reputation internationally, at Dia Art Foundation in the United States, featuring numerous works including Up in the Sky (1997) and Heaven (1997).

== 2000s ==
In 2000, Moffatt's work was amongst those by eight individual or collaborative groups of Indigenous Australian artists included in a major exhibition of Australian Indigenous art held in the prestigious Nicholas Hall at the Hermitage Museum in Russia. The exhibition received a positive reception from Russian critics, one of whom wrote:

This is an exhibition of contemporary art, not in the sense that it was done recently, but in that it is cased in the mentality, technology and philosophy of radical art of the most recent times. No one, other than the Aborigines of Australia, has succeeded in exhibiting such art at the Hermitage.

Moffatt's work since 2000 has retreated from specific locales and subject matter and become more explicitly concerned with fame and celebrity. Her series Fourth (2001) used images of sportspeople from the 2000 Summer Olympic Games coming fourth in their various competitions. Seeking to underline their outsider status, the images are treated so only the ignoble fourth place holder is highlighted.

2003 saw Moffatt named by Australian Art Collector magazine as one of the country's 50 most collectible artists.

Adventure Series (2004) is Moffatt's most unabashed fantasy series using painted backdrops, costumes and models (including the artist herself) to enact a soap opera like drama of doctors, nurses and pilots in a tropical setting. Under The Sign of Scorpio (2005) is a series 40 images in which the artist takes on the persona of famous women born – like the artist – under the zodiac sign of Scorpio. The series reiterates the artist's ongoing interests in celebrity, alternate personas and constructed realities. Moffatt's 2007 series Portraits explores the idea of 'celebrity' among people in her immediate social circle – family members, fellow artists, her dealer – through 'glamorised' renderings of their faces using computer technology, repetitive framing and bright colours.

== 2010s ==
In 2017 Moffatt was selected to represent Australia at the Venice Biennale for her solo exhibition "My Horizon", which was curated by Natalie King. The exhibition consisted of two videos, The White Ghosts Sailed In and Vigil, and two series of photographs, Body Remembers and Passage. My Horizon tackles problems of colonialism and imperialism in Australia and how it affects the Indigenous population. This biennial is the first time since 1997 that Australia has been represented by an Indigenous artist.

== 2020s ==
From 28 May until 24 July 2022, the exhibition Land Abounds, featuring the work of brothers Abdul Abdullah and Abdul-Rahman Abdullah as well as video works by Moffatt, runs at the NSW Southern Highlands gallery of Ngununggula (meaning "belonging". Abdul-Rahman said:

Tracey Moffatt is an iconic figure to both of us. She holds a mirror up to a social landscape that we all understand, exposing the dynamics of power that we consume and enact. The ways in which our works engage and respond to each other creates a multi-layered dialogue that always seems to come back to ideas of perception and power. What dictates our perceptions of the world, how are we perceived and how do we participate in that equation with autonomy.

In 2024, Moffatt created the gothic photographic series of eight images, The Burning, which was first presented at Roslyn Oxley9 Gallery, Sydney, Australia.

== Film and video work ==
Moffatt's work in film and video has included short films, experimental video and a feature film. The short films rely on the stylistic genre features of experimental cinema – usually including non-realist narrative scenarios often shot on sound stages echoing her work in still photography. Early works such as Nice Coloured Girls and Night Cries also use sound mixes that reinforce the 'fakeness' of the settings and use well-worn experimental cinema devices such as audio field recordings and low tones to provide atmosphere. Her series of montage video works made in collaboration with Gary Hillberg, including Lip (1999), Artist (2000), Love (2003), DOOMED (2007) and REVOLUTION (2008), use the cut up methodology of taking images from pre-existing sources and re-editing them into ironic commentaries on the material. Artist for example provides a commentary on the clichéd role of the artist in Hollywood cinema, and DOOMED remixes a collection of scenes of destruction from disaster movies.

=== Night Cries: A Rural Tragedy (1989) ===
Primarily concerned with a series of almost static vignettes, Night Cries reiterates many of Moffatt's visual motifs from her still photography – sets, non-acting, an evocative use of sound and music. In Night Cries Moffatt's attempts to draw ironic or romantic connotations in juxtaposition to the images and narratives, such as her use of Jimmy Little. Moffatt also makes explicit references to Australian art history, drawing parallels between Indigenous history and the recording the landscape by non-Indigenous artists by quoting artists such as Frederick McCubbin's The Pioneer.

In the film, Moffatt reminds and displays history of the colonial past of Aboriginal people. The film makes connections between Aboriginal people and their colonizers by touching on systems that were used by colonizers to harm and put Aboriginals at a disadvantage. In the film, there is a clear tension and mixed feelings between the characters, one being a white woman and the other an Aboriginal woman, who play adoptive mother and daughter, respectively.

Moffatt uses different aspects of colonization of Aboriginal people to illustrate the damage and hurtful events that took place, reminding viewers of the past colonial history.

=== Bedevil (1993) ===
Shown at the 1993 Cannes Film Festival, Bedevil is composed of three self-contained narratives with visual motifs. In the first story Mister Chuck Moffatt uses the character of an American soldier, in the second part Choo Choo Choo Choo railway tracks connect a series of events and in the final part Lovin' the Spin I'm in a landlord who evicts a family from a house. The images were partly inspired by memories from her early life.

=== Lip (1999) ===
In Lip, Moffatt collates clips of black servants in Hollywood movies talking back to their 'bosses', attempting to expose the attitudes to race often found in mainstream cinema. Also, this film is written on two women, one white and one black. In this film, the story line shows the conflict between the white woman and the black woman who is her maid. It shows racial tensions.

=== Artist (2000) ===
Moffatt's Artist is a collection of clips from movies and television programs that depict artists at work, at play and in the act of creation. By showing the particular bias of television and cinema to what the role of an artist apparently means to modern society, the film reflects the sometimes uninformed, sometimes humorous view of society towards artists today.

=== REVOLUTION (2008) ===
Commissioned for the 16th Biennale of Sydney in 2008.

== Honours and recognition ==
Moffatt was inducted onto the Victorian Honour Roll of Women in 2001. She was appointed an Officer of the Order of Australia in the 2016 Australia Day Honours.

== Filmography ==
- Nice Coloured Girls (1987)
- Watch Out (1987)
- Moodeitj Yorgas (1988)
- A Change of Face (1988)
- It’s Up to You (1989)
- Night Cries: A Rural Tragedy (1990)
- Bedevil (1993)
- INXS: The Messenger (1993)
- Heaven (1997)
- Artist (1999)
- Lip (1999)
- Love (2003)
- DOOMED (2007)
- REVOLUTION (2008)
- Mother (2009)
- Other (2009)
- The White Ghosts Sailed In (2017)
- Vigil (2017)
