= Abdul Abdullah =

Australian artist (born 1986)

- Born: 1986 (age 39–40); Perth, Western Australia
- Citizenship: Australian
- Education: Curtin University; UNSW Art and Design
- Known for: Contemporary art
- Awards: 2011 Blake Prize for Human Justice; 5-time finalist in both Archibald and Sulman Prizes

Abdul Abdullah (born 1986) is a Sydney-based Australian multidisciplinary artist, the younger brother of Abdul-Rahman Abdullah, also an artist. Abdul Abdullah has been a finalist several times in the Archibald, Wynne and Sulman Prizes. He creates provocative works that make political statements and query identity, in particular looking at being a Muslim in Australia, and examines the themes of alienation and othering.

== Early life and education ==
Born in Perth in 1986, Abdul Abdullah is the younger brother of artist Abdul-Rahman Abdullah (born 1977), who lives in rural Western Australia. Their mother is Malay, while their father is Anglo-Australian, and the family is Muslim.

Abdullah is a 7th-generation Australian on his father's side, whose ancestors arrived on the Indefatigable (a convict ship) 200 years ago. Two of his grandfathers fought in the Second World War in New Guinea.

He graduated from Curtin University in Perth in 2008, and went on to complete an Master of Fine Arts at UNSW Art and Design in Sydney in 2017.

== Career ==
In April 2015, the Art Gallery of Western Australia held a "WA Focus" exhibition featuring the work of both Abdul and Abdul-Rahman, in which both brothers express their experiences of growing up Muslim in Australia. For Abdul, nine years younger than Abdul-Rahman, the aftermath of the terrorist attacks of 11 September 2001 had a huge effect on him as a child, and has informed his art practice. His memories include witnessing a man tearing his mother's hijab from her head. His works at this exhibition included three collages of people wearing balaclavas over their heads, which had been created from photos of an eye each of Kanye and Beyoncé and the mouth of Madonna. The series was called Entertainers (Kanye, Beyoncé and Madonna), but that clue was missed by the people who wrote to The West Australian (which had featured an article on the exhibition and a photo of the brothers in front of the work) complaining that the art works promoted terrorism.

In September 2015, Abdullah gave a talk about his practice at TedX Sydney, speaking about how his identity had been politicised since the events of 9/11, and how the war on terror had affected his family and his understanding of and relationship with the world.

In 2016, his portrait of former New South Wales Police officer Craig Campbell, who defended two Middle Eastern men during the 2005 Cronulla riots and afterwards suffered from PTSD, was a finalist for the Archibald Prize, the third time for Abdullah.

In a 2017 solo exhibition at the UNSW Galleries, Abdullah's work represented "popular understandings of young Muslims from a non-Muslim perspective", which encouraged viewers to think about their own biases.

In February–March 2018, Abdullah's work was included in an exhibition co-curated by his brother Abdul-Rahman with Nur Shkembi, called Waqt al-tagheer: Time of change at ACE Open, Adelaide as part of the Adelaide Festival. The exhibition showcased the work of 11 Muslim Australian artists, including that of Abdul-Rahman and photographic artist Hoda Afshar. His works Journey to the West and Wedding (comprising two works, "Delegated Risk Management" and "Mutual Assurances") again explore the theme of identity, contrasting self-identity with the identity imposed by others.

His works for the touring exhibition Violent Salt (2019–2020), which featured many overtly political works by mostly Aboriginal Australian artists, were called All Let Us Rejoice and For We Are Young and Free, and featured Australian soldiers overlaid with smiley emojis. National Party MP George Christensen and a local councillor for Mackay took exception and complained about the artworks in Facebook posts, after which both Abdullah and the local gallery staff received threats, and the local mayor asked the gallery to remove the works.

His installation at the 2020 Adelaide Biennial of Australian Art: Monster Theatres (29 February – 16 August 2020), Understudy, featured an ape dressed in clothes, sitting in an empty theatre. In June 2020, Abdullah participated in a project called 52 Actions at Artspace in Sydney, in which he documented his own text-based tattoos in a series of photographs, accompanied by a written piece explaining how each serves to remind him of his political principles.

From 28 May until 24 July 2022, the exhibition Land Abounds, featuring the work of both Abdullah brothers and video work by Tracey Moffatt, runs at the NSW Southern Highlands gallery of Ngununggula (meaning "belonging" in the local Gundungurra language).

== Art practice and themes ==
Abdullah works in painting, photography, video, installation and performance art.

Seeing himself as an "outsider amongst outsiders", as a Muslim and Malay, and he engages with and depicts the experience of "the Other" in society. He has worked with various marginalised minority groups, and has a special interest in how young Australian Muslims experience multiculturalism in Australia. He does not attempt to address specifics of the religion, but instead examines the experience of displacement and alienation which come with migration (to countries in which Muslims are in the minority).

He also engages with other creatives throughout the Asia Pacific region, and admires the work of Tracey Moffatt. On the occasion of the 2022 exhibition Land Abounds, featuring work of both Abdullah brothers and video works by Moffatt, Abdul's brother Abdul-Rahman said:

We overlap in so many different ways, and our work is like an ongoing conversation we're having about the worlds we're experiencing. Tracey Moffatt is an iconic figure to both of us. She holds a mirror up to a social landscape that we all understand, exposing the dynamics of power that we consume and enact. The ways in which our works engage and respond to each other creates a multi-layered dialogue that always seems to come back to ideas of perception and power. What dictates our perceptions of the world, how are we perceived and how do we participate in that equation with autonomy.

Abdullah creates deliberately provocative works in order to "create an environment that encourages critical thinking". In "Self-Portrait as an Ultra-nationalist" (2013), his T-shirt reads "Fuck off we’re full" and features an Australian flag. For "It Doesn't Matter How I Feel" (2013) only his hands are not painted black, with one doing a thumbs-up, the other extending the middle finger.

He has encountered negative reactions to his work sometimes, but has also received positive responses for the same work, such as from military veterans for his Violent Salt works, which opened a discussion on the poor treatment of veterans.

== Other activities ==
In November 2025, Abdullah featured on ABC Television as one of three judges on the series Portrait Artist of the Year.

== Awards and recognition ==
In 2011 Abdullah won the Blake Prize for Human Justice, for his photographic self-portrait entitled "Them and Us" of himself and his brother, for which he especially got a tattoo of the Southern Cross placed around an Islamic crescent moon and star.

Abdullah was a finalist in the 2016 Brett Whiteley Travelling Art Scholarship.

As of 2020 his work had been shortlisted five times for the Archibald: in 2011 for a portrait of academic and media personality Waleed Aly; in 2013 for his portrait of boxer Anthony Mundine; in 2014, of Aboriginal artist and activist Richard Bell; in 2016 for Craig Campbell (see above); and in 2020, for his "Untitled self-portrait".

He has been finalist for the Sulman Prize five times.

In 2019 he won the inaugural Australian Muslim Artists Art Prize, and in the same year was shortlisted along with his brother Abdul-Rahman Abdullah to represent Australia in the 2019 Venice Biennale.

His work A Terrible Burden was shortlisted for the 2020 Wynne Prize.

In 2021, Abdullah was awarded a Marten Bequest Scholarship.

A portrait of Abdullah by Jasper Knight was a finalist for the 2022 Archibald Prize.

In 2023, his work Legacy assets was selected as a finalist for the Ramsay Art Prize at the Art Gallery of South Australia. The work consisted of five panels of oil painting, creating a panorama stretching 10 m (33 ft) wide, depicting landscape near Berrima, NSW. Intended as "a critique of the historical role of colonial Australian landscape painters", the work has the question "What would our public collections look like if we divested them of sex pests and paedophiles?" written in large capital letters over it.

== Collections ==
Abdullah's works are represented in many significant galleries, including:

- Artbank, a national art rental program
- Art Gallery of Western Australia, Perth
- Bendigo Art Gallery, Bendigo, Victoria
- Gallery of Modern Art, Brisbane
- Islamic Museum of Australia, Melbourne
- Murdoch University, Perth
- Museum of Contemporary Art Australia (MCA), Sydney
- National Gallery of Australia, Canberra
- QAGOMA, Brisbane – Coming to terms (2015)
- University of Western Australia, Perth

== Selected exhibitions ==
His work has been included in many exhibitions, including:

- Primavera exhibition at the MCA, Sydney (2015)
- WA Focus, at the Art Gallery of Western Australia (2015)
- Perth Institute of Contemporary Arts (2015)
- Asia Pacific Triennial at the Gallery of Modern Art in Brisbane (2015)
- Australian Centre for Contemporary Art, Melbourne (2016)
- Abdul Abdullah: Terms of Engagement (2017), a solo exhibition at the UNSW Galleries
- Pataka Art + Museum, New Zealand (2017)
- Art Basel Hong Kong (2017, 2019)
- Asia Now Art Fair, Paris (2017)
- MAIIAM Contemporary Art Museum, Chiangmai, Thailand (2019)
- National Gallery of Australia, as part of Infinite Conversations (2019)
- Violent Salt, a touring exhibition (2019–2020)
- Adelaide Biennial (2020)
- The Armory Show, New York (2020), a solo exhibition, presented by Yavuz Gallery
- Gropius Bau, Berlin (2020)
- Land Abounds, Ngununggula, Bowral, New South Wales (2022)
