= James Mollison =

Australian art gallery director (1931–2020)

James Mollison AO
- Born: 20 March 1931; Wonthaggi, Victoria, Australia
- Died: 19 January 2020 (aged 88)
- Education: Secondary Teachers College
- Occupation: Arts administrator
- Known for: Director of the National Gallery of Australia (1971–1989)

James Mollison AO (20 March 1931 – 19 January 2020) was acting director of the National Gallery of Australia (NGA) from 1971 to 1977 and director from 1977 to 1989. He was director of the National Gallery of Victoria from 1989 to 1995.

== Early life and career ==
Mollison was born in Wonthaggi, Victoria, and graduated from Secondary Teachers College (now part of the Faculty of Education of the University of Melbourne). He was education officer at the National Gallery of Victoria in 1960 and 1961 and director of Gallery A, Toorak, in 1964 and 1965. He was director of the Ballarat Fine Art Gallery in 1967 and 1968.

== National Gallery of Australia ==
From 1969 to 1971, Mollison was the executive officer for the Commonwealth Art Advisory Board (CAAB) and exhibitions officer in the Commonwealth Prime Minister's Department. His original responsibilities were to advise on the Government's acquisition of art (only the acquisition of Australian art was authorised), to catalog the national collection and to arrange exhibitions of Australian art overseas.

Nevertheless, the Gorton Government's failure to appoint a director of the NGA required that Mollison become involved in the development of the design for the building. In November 1970, the CAAB decided that he would be redesignated as assistant director (development).

The new prime minister, William McMahon, announced the appointment of Mollison as acting director of the NGA in October 1971, and tenders for construction of a Gallery building were called in November 1972 to house paintings which had been collected and displayed around Parliament House, in Commonwealth offices, including diplomatic missions overseas, and State Galleries since 1910.

He was notable for establishing the Gallery and building on the collection that had already been assembled of mainly Australian paintings by purchasing icons of modern western art, most famously the 1974 purchases of Blue Poles by Jackson Pollock ($1.3m), and Woman V by Willem de Kooning ($650,000). These purchases were very controversial at the time, but are now generally considered to be reasonable acquisitions. In retrospect Mollison's reputation was redeemed over time, citing the attention of the purchase as being good for the gallery.

He also built up the other collections, often with the help of donations. Starting in 1973 Mollison secured funding from Philip Morris to acquire contemporary Australian photography for the ANG, though Ian North was not appointed Foundation Curator of Photography until 1980. In 1975 Arthur Boyd presented several thousand of his works to the Gallery. in 1977 Mollison persuaded Sunday Reed to donate Sidney Nolan's remarkable Ned Kelly series to the ANG. In 1981, Albert Tucker and his wife presented a substantial collection of Tucker's collection to the Gallery. As a result, the ANG now has one of the finest collections of Australian art.

In 1976 the newly established ANG Council advertised for a permanent director to fill the position that Mollison had been acting in since 1971. The new prime minister, Malcolm Fraser, announced the appointment of Mollison as director in 1977, and the new Gallery building was opened by Queen Elizabeth II in 1982.

His successor, Dr Betty Churcher, said that when she took over in 1990 he "was of almost legendary stature [and] had single-handedly built a great and comprehensive collection from the ground up; indeed he had presided over the collection for more than twenty years with great flair, and over the institution for seven years—it was in the truest sense, his Gallery, his professional achievement."

Mollison retired as director in 1989 and moved to Melbourne to become director of the National Gallery of Victoria. He was appointed Member of the Order of Australia (AM) in 1984 and promoted to Officer (AO) in 1992 for service to arts administration.

== Death ==
Mollison died on 19 January 2020 at the age of 88.

Cultural offices
New title	Director of the National Gallery of Australia; 1977–1989	Succeeded by Betty Churcher
