= Betty Churcher =

Australian arts administrator

Betty Churcher AO
- Born: Elizabeth Ann Dewar Cameron; 11 January 1931; Brisbane, Queensland, Australia
- Died: 31 March 2015 (aged 84); Wamboin, New South Wales, Australia
- Education: Somerville House; Royal College of Art; The Courtauld Institute of Art; Australian National University
- Occupation: Arts administrator
- Known for: Director of the National Gallery of Australia (1990–1997)
- Spouse: Roy Churcher (m. 1955; died 2014)
- Children: Peter Churcher, Ben Churcher, Tim Churcher, Paul Churcher

Elizabeth Ann Dewar Churcher AO (née Cameron; 11 January 1931 – 31 March 2015) was an Australian arts administrator, best known as director of the National Gallery of Australia from 1990 to 1997. She was also a painter in her own right earlier in her life.

== Early life and education ==
Elizabeth Cameron was born on 11 January 1931 in Brisbane. From age 7 to 15 she attended Somerville House school, paid for by her grandmother. There she was taught art by Patricia Prentice. She left school after grade 10 because her father did not think she needed a higher education.

In 1942 as an 11-year-old, Churcher saw Blandford Fletcher's Evicted at the Queensland Art Gallery, which inspired her to become an artist. After leaving school, she studied under artist Caroline Barker.

Churcher won a Royal Queensland Art Society travelling scholarship to Europe and attended the Royal College of Art in London. She received a Master of Arts from the Courtauld Institute of Art, University of London, in 1977.

== Career ==
External images
- Photograph
- 2008 photograph by Dean Golja

In the years preceding the formation of the Queensland Branch of the Contemporary Art Society, Betty and her husband Roy Churcher involved a new group of people who were interested in contemporary art (in particular modernism) in Brisbane. (Roy was a key instigator of the establishment of the society, and became one of two inaugural vice-presidents when it was established in 1961.)

Between 1972 and 1975, Churcher was art critic for The Australian newspaper.

In 1982 she became Dean of the School of Art and Design at the progressive Phillip Institute of Technology (since absorbed into RMIT University), and combined administration with teaching art history there until 1987, when she was appointed director of the Art Gallery of Western Australia. She left in 1990 after disagreements with Robert Holmes à Court about the gallery's acquisition of a Pierre Bonnard painting.

She was then appointed director of the Australian National Gallery. She hosted several television shows in the 1990s and authored several books, including The Art of War about war artists.

While director of the National Gallery, she was dubbed "Betty Blockbuster" because of her love of blockbuster exhibitions and for her love of movies. Churcher initiated the building of new galleries on the eastern side of the building, opened in March 1998, to house large-scale temporary exhibitions. She changed the name of the Gallery from the Australian National Gallery to its current title. During her tenure the museum also purchased Golden Summer, Eaglemont by Arthur Streeton for $3.5 million. This was the last great picture from the Heidelberg School still in private hands.

Churcher dedicated her time to displaying hidden artworks and lesser known acquisitions of the National Gallery of Australia in a television program called Hidden Treasures on the Australian Broadcasting Corporation.

== Recognition ==
In 1996 a portrait of Churcher painted by her son, Peter Churcher, and titled Betty at Home was a finalist in the Archibald Prize. The prize is awarded for the "best portrait painting preferentially of some man or woman distinguished in Art, Letters, Science or Politics". Davida Allen painted a portrait of her in 1990, titled Hey Betty.

In 2001, Churcher was inducted into the Victorian Honour Roll of Women.

== Death and legacy ==
Churcher died of cancer on 31 March 2015 at the age of 84.

After her death she was described by one writer as "a seminal figure in the arts sector, a superior curator and administrator as well as a gifted communicator who introduced Australians to the world of art outside the national collections".

The National Gallery of Australia introduced the Betty Churcher Memorial Oration in 2022; the inaugural speaker was the Australian director of the Hirshhorn Museum in Washington, Melissa Chiu.

== Family ==
Betty was married to Roy (1933–2014) and had four sons and seven grandchildren. One son is the artist Peter Churcher.

== Bibliography ==
=== Books ===
- Churcher, Betty (1973). Understanding Art. Adelaide: Rigby. ISBN 0-85179-699-0.
- — (1984). Molvig The Lost Antipodean. Melbourne: Penguin. ISBN 0-7139-1524-2.
- — (2005). The Art of War. Melbourne: Melbourne University Press. ISBN 0-522-85099-5.
- — (2011). Notebooks. Miegunyah Press. ISBN 978-0-522-85842-6.
- with Lucy Quinn (2013). Treasures of Canberra. Braddon, Australian Capital Territory: Halstead Press. ISBN 9781920831981.
- — (2013). Adam & Sarah Explore Turner. Canberra: National Gallery of Australia. ISBN 9780642334374.
- — (2014). Australian Notebooks. Melbourne: Miegunyah Press. ISBN 9780522864199.
- — (2015). The Forgotten Notebook. Melbourne: Miegunyah Press. ISBN 9780522868678.

=== Critical studies and reviews ===
- Dodge, Alan (June 2011). "En plein musée". Australian Book Review (Review of Notebooks) (332): 77.

== See also ==
- Women in the art history field

== Notes ==
Cultural offices
Preceded by James Mollison	Director of the National Gallery of Australia; 1990–1997	Succeeded by Brian Kennedy
