= Megan Cope =

Australian Aboriginal artist of Quandamooka heritage

- Born: 1982 (age 43–44); Brisbane, Queensland, Australia
- Notable work: The Blaktism
- Awards: Winner, Western Australian Indigenous Art Award, 2015

Megan Cope (born 1982) is an Australian Aboriginal artist from the Quandamooka people of Stradbroke Island/Minjerribah. She is known for her sculptural installations, video art and paintings, in which she explores themes such as identity and colonialism. Cope is a member of the contemporary Indigenous art collective ProppaNOW in Brisbane.

== Early life and education ==
Cope was born in Brisbane in 1982, of Quandamooka heritage. She earned a Bachelor of Visual Arts (Visual Communication), at Deakin University in Victoria in 2006.

== Career ==
Cope has managed and curated many artist-run projects and events, including tinygold and the BARI (Brisbane Artist Run Initiative) Festival. Cope is also a member of the Brisbane-based contemporary Indigenous art collective ProppaNOW.

Cope creates video, installation, sculptures, and paintings which challenge notions of Aboriginality, and her work examines the Australian narrative and our sense of time and ownership in a settler colonial state. A main focus of Cope's artwork is to shed light on colonialism and the myths and facts that come along with it.

Her work has been exhibited in the National Gallery of Australia, the Art Gallery of Western Australia, the Melbourne Museum, as well as many other public and private collections throughout Australia.

In 2016–2017, Cope's work was exhibited along with that of Vincent Namatjira in the Tarnanthi Festival of Contemporary Aboriginal and Torres Strait Islander Art at the Art Gallery of South Australia.

In 2017, the Australian War Memorial commissioned Cope as official war artist (the first female Aboriginal woman in the role), to travel to the Middle East to accompany various Australian Defence Force units, in order to record and interpret topics relating to Australia's contribution to the international effort in the region. A series of works entitled Flight or fight was mounted on North Stradbroke Island blue gum.

In the 2020 Adelaide Biennial of Australian Art, titled Monster Theatres, Cope created an installation made of rocks, rusted steel drums, wire and huge drill bits that functions as an instrument designed to be played by musicians using modified bows and which mimics the sound of the bush stone-curlew, a native bird which is thriving on Minjerribah (now North Stradbroke Island), but endangered in New South Wales and Victoria.

Cope lives and works in Melbourne.

== Projects ==
=== Video ===
- The Blaktism looks at culture and identity as well as racism.
- Nimbulima Ngolongmai
- Boykambil
- Yugambeh

=== Exhibitions ===
- 2020 Adelaide Biennial of Australian Art: Monster Theatres, Art Gallery of South Australia and Adelaide Botanic Garden (29 February - 8 June 2020)
- Water, Gallery of Modern Art, Brisbane (7 December - 26 April 2020)
- My country, I still call Australia Home: Contemporary Art from Black Australia, Gallery of Modern Art, Brisbane (1 June - 7 October 2013)
- Curator for Art with Attitude at the Airport Village in Australia in 2012.
- Curator of Nine Wives Exhibition in 2011.
- Curated for the BARI Festival in King George Square in 2010.
- Desperate Spaces was a fundraising event curated by Cope in Brisbane.

=== Sculptures ===
- Cope's most well-known art project is the glow-in-the-dark ground installations at Charlish Park in Redcliffe, Queensland. This ceramic installation is present in the pathway and shows mapping techniques of historical events, glowing in the dark at night.
- The Tide is High is a project that represents the loss of geography in Australia due to colonialism. It was created in 2013 and highlights ideas of colonialism such as erasure of indigenous culture, jobs, and land.
- Fluid Terrain (2013) is an installation exhibited at the Queensland Art Gallery, which connects the Quandamooka people with historical maps. This is Cope's largest project she has done thus far.

=== Paintings ===
Cope's paintings use synthetic paint as well as Indian Ink.

- Mining Boom (2013)
- Mining Boom Part Two (2013)
- Yalukit William (2014)
- Boon Wurrung (2014)

== Awards ==
- Western Australian Indigenous Art Award, 2015, worth A$50,000, for The Blaktism

== Collections ==
The Gallery of Modern Art, Brisbane purchased Re Formation 2016–2019 in 2019, and included it in the Water exhibition (7 December 2019 – 26 April 2020).
