= Michael Cook (photographic artist) =

Australian art photographer (born 1968)

- Born: 26 August 1968 (age 57); Brisbane, Queensland
- Known for: Art photography
- Notable work: Through My Eyes, Undiscovered, Majority Rule
- Awards: 2008 and 2011 Visual Artist of the Year, Deadly Awards; People’s Choice Award, Western Australian Indigenous Art Awards

Michael Cook (born 25 August 1968) is an Aboriginal Australian photographic artist of Bidjara (south-western Queensland) heritage, whose work is held in major Australian galleries. He strives to promote understanding of Indigenous Australian culture and history in his work, and is the winner of two Deadly Awards.

== Early life and education ==
Michael Cook was born on 25 August 1968 in Brisbane, Queensland. He was raised by adoptive parents Ronda and Keith Cook, who were not Indigenous, but brought him up to value and nurture his Aboriginal identity.

His natural mother, Valda Cook (no relation to the adoptive Cooks), was a white teenager. After making contact with Valda as an adult, he learnt that his father was Bidjara, but he has never met him or spoken to him.

Michael went to school in Hervey Bay. He was 14 years old when he got his first camera, and got a job in a photo processing lab at 17.

== Career ==
When Cook was around 20 years old, he opened his own makeover studio, also working at photographic labs and as a wedding photographer until 2007, when he started doing fashion photography. He moved into art photography in 2009.

His first solo exhibition, Through My Eyes (2010), consisted of photographs of Australia’s prime ministers overlaid with the faces of Aboriginal people, conveying the idea of the government seeing things from the perspective of Indigenous Australians. The series was first shown in a Brisbane gallery (Andrew Baker Art Dealer), where it was seen and bought by four curators from the National Gallery of Australia (NGA), where it is held today. The series was included in the Western Australian Indigenous Art Awards in 2011, and featured in an exhibition at the Museum of Australian Democracy in Canberra in 2014.

In 2011 Cook created two new series, Broken Dreams and Undiscovered, which were included in the 2nd National Indigenous Art Triennial, titled Undisclosed, in 2012, and are now held in the NGA. They examine the colonial history of Australia in a way that provokes the imagination.

In 2013 Cook was selected for ACCELERATE, a leadership program for Aboriginal and Torres Strait Islander people in the creative arts, run jointly by the British Council and Australia Council between 2009 and 2016. He was also awarded the Greene Street Studio Residency in New York City in 2014 by the Australia Council.

His series Mother was launched at Art Basel Hong Kong in 2016, where he was again represented in 2019.

In 2020 his series "Livin’ the Dream" was selected for the Paris Photo art fair in New York, before its cancellation due to the COVID-19 pandemic. His work was instead uploaded online, and was also mounted as an exhibition at the This Is No Fantasy gallery in Fitzroy in Melbourne from May to June.

In 2020 the first major survey exhibition of Cook's work, entitled Michael Cook: Undiscovered, was mounted at the new University of the Sunshine Coast Gallery, accompanied by a monograph.

== Techniques and themes ==
Cook uses some of the techniques from his former career in his later practice, such as retouching, styling, hair, and make-up. Utilising photographic layering, his photographs have been likened to paintings, as he builds on his idea to create the final composition.

He aims to foster understanding of Indigenous cultures in his work:

It’s about learning Australia’s history to create a better future. Through my art I ask questions, "How would a better understanding of Indigenous culture for the past 200 years affect Aboriginal people today?" Australia is very multicultural, it’s about everyone having a little more understanding and not just looking at the whole picture as black-and-white.

== Awards ==
Cook has been a finalist in many awards and won several, including:

- 2008: Winner, "Visual Artist of the Year", 14th Annual Deadly Awards
- 2011: Winner, "Visual Artist of the Year", 17th Annual Deadly Awards
- 2011: Winner, "People’s Choice Award", Western Australian Indigenous Art Awards
- 2016: Winner, Sunshine Coast Art Prize, Caloundra Regional Gallery, Queensland

== Collections ==
Cook's work is represented in all major Australian galleries, as well as many significant international collections, including:

- British Museum, London
- Kluge-Ruhe Aboriginal Art Collection at the University of Virginia, US
- Los Angeles County Museum of Art, Los Angeles
- Museum of Contemporary Aboriginal Art, Utrecht, Netherlands
- National Gallery of Victoria (NGV), Melbourne
- National Museum of World Cultures, Netherlands

== Selected exhibitions ==
=== Solo ===
- Through My Eyes (2010)
- Michael Cook: Undiscovered, University of the Sunshine Coast Gallery, Queensland (2020)
- Undiscovered: Photographic Works by Michael Cook, Australian National Maritime Museum, Sydney (2021)

=== Group ===
- 2nd National Indigenous Art Triennial, titled unDisclosed, at the NGA (2012)
- 7th Asia Pacific Triennial of Contemporary Art, Brisbane (2013)
- 19th Biennale of Sydney (2014)
- Venice Biennale (2015), series “Object”, as part of Personal Structures: Crossing Borders at Palazzo Mora
- Indigenous Australia: Enduring Civilisation at the British Museum (2015)
- Mapping Australia: Country to Cartography, AAMU Museum of Contemporary Aboriginal Art, Utrecht, Netherlands (2015–16)
- Lifelines: Indigenous Contemporary Art from Australia, Musée de la Civilisation in Québec, Canada (2016)
- Artist and Empire: (En)countering Colonial Legacies, Tate Gallery/National Gallery Singapore, Singapore (2016)
- Taba Naba: Australie, Océanie, arts des peuples de la mer, at the Musée Océanographique in Monaco (2016)
- Colony: Frontier Wars, National Gallery of Victoria, exhibiting the series Majority Rule (2018)
- Cape Town Art Fair, South Africa (2019)
- Museum of Photographic Arts, San Diego, California (2019)
- Series "Invasion" exhibited at Melbourne's Federation Square as part of "The Blak Infinite" program at the RISING festival, 2024
