= Kathy Balngayngu Marika =

Australian dancer

Kathy Balngayngu Marika (born 1957) is an Aboriginal Australian dancer known for her performances with Bangarra Dance Theatre, with which she served as artist-in-residence and cultural consultant.

== Early life ==
Marika is part of the Rirratjingu clan in the Yirrkala community of Arnhem Land. She is the youngest of five sisters and grew up dancing with female relatives as part of her culture.

== Career ==
When Marika was forty, she joined the National Aboriginal Islander Skills Development Association, which led her to working with Bangarra Dance Theatre. She first performed with the company in 2003. Writing in The Australian that same year, critic Martin Buzacott wrote that she was "crucial" to the company's performance of Bush, bringing, "a natural authority and an intense dignity to the performance." She continued to work with the company, traveling in its productions to cities such as London, New York, and Saigon.

In 2011, she helped create Bloodland, a play for the Sydney Theatre Company, along with Wayne Blair and Stephen Page. Also in 2011, she won the Deadly Award for Best Dancer.

As artist-in-residence for Bangarra Dance Theatre, she took dancers to her community and exposed them to Aboriginal cultural practices. She also participated in the company's educational programs and workshops.
