= L'Après-midi à Naples =

1875 painting by Paul Cézanne

Afternoon in Naples
- L'Après-midi à Naples (French)
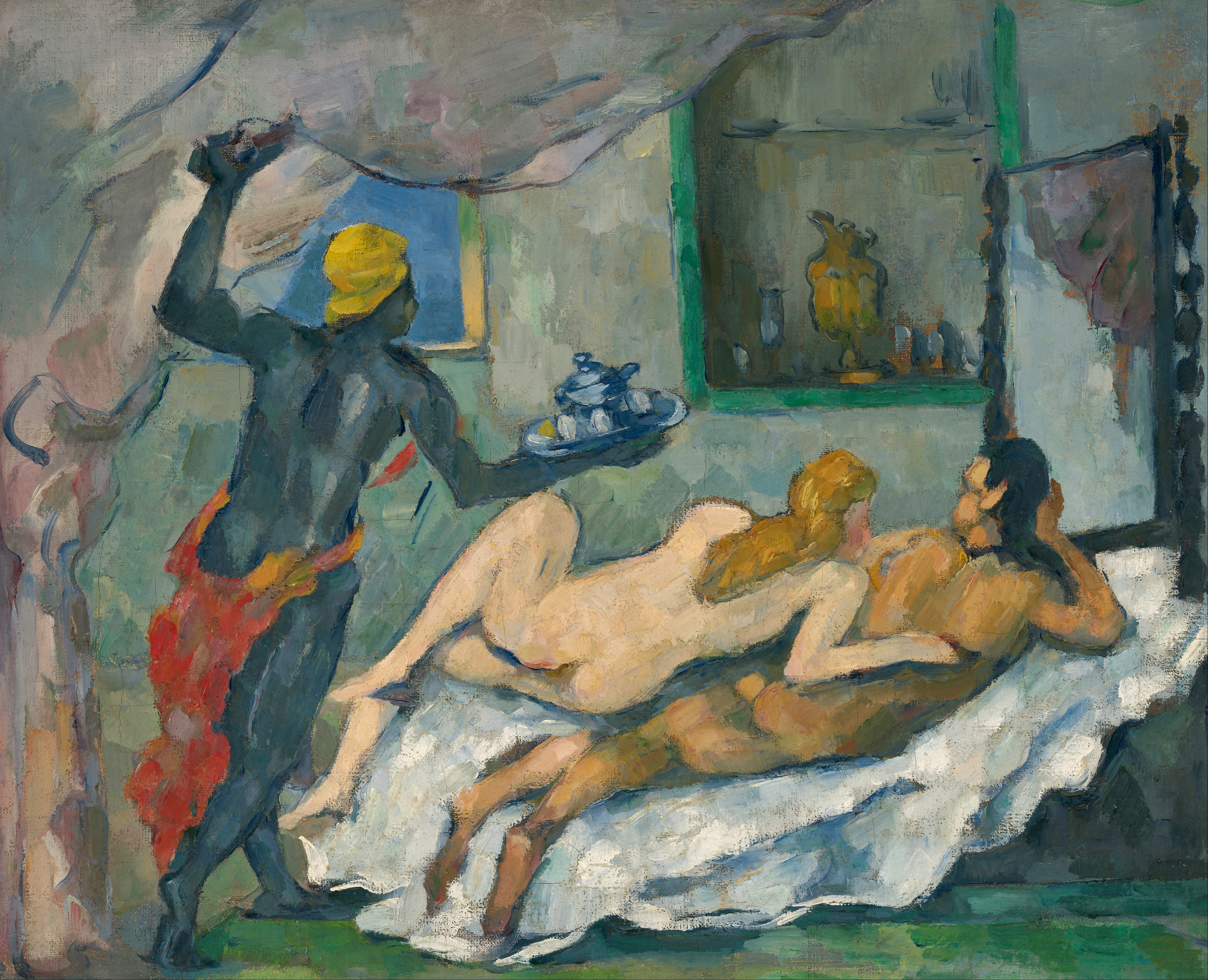
- Artist: Paul Cézanne
- Year: c. 1875
- Type: oil on canvas
- Dimensions: 37 cm × 45 cm (15 in × 18 in)
- Location: National Gallery of Australia, Canberra

L'Après-midi à Naples (English: Afternoon in Naples) is an oil-on-canvas painting by the French artist Paul Cézanne, from c. 1875. The work is in held at the National Gallery of Australia, in Canberra.

The art dealer Ambroise Vollard related that the title for the painting L'Apres Midi à Naples was proposed to Cézanne by his friend the landscape painter Antoine Guillemet. There are two known preliminary sketches for the painting.

The painting depicts a nude couple, a woman and a man lying face down on the bed, while a servant appears with a tray. The woman's hand rests sensually on the man's back, reflected in the contours of her knee and feet, which barely touch the servant's hand and leg, and even in the way the edge of the tray barely touches the corner of the cupboard. The angles of the servant's hands echo the angles of the window, the cupboard, the mirror, and the hands of the reclining couple. As if on a stage, the servant opens the curtain, revealing the most intimate moment. Although Cézanne never visited Italy, the scene may reflect French stereotypes of that country, where afternoons were supposedly dedicated to the pleasures of the flesh, and of Naples as the most vivid expression of Italy. Perhaps the painting references Stéphane Mallarmé's poem "The Afternoon of a Faun" (1865-1867, 1876).

The painting's dramatis personae and arrangement of figures is said to have been influenced by the work of Eugène Delacroix. The fact that the afternoon is given over to carnality is said to signify that Italy was seen as a place of taking pleasure and Naples was most prominent on that map of indulgence.

The National Gallery of Australia also owns Lucian Freud's After Cézanne (2000) created by the later painter in response to this work.

== See also ==
- List of paintings by Paul Cézanne
