= After Cézanne =

2000 painting by Lucian Freud

- Artist: Lucian Freud
- Year: 1999–2000
- Medium: Oil on canvas
- Dimensions: 232.2 cm × 232.2 cm × 16 cm (91.4 in × 91.4 in × 6.3 in)
- Weight: 165 kg
- Location: National Gallery of Australia
- Accession: 2001.36

After Cezanne is a large, irregular shaped, obtuse painting done in oils on canvas, begun in 1999 and completed in 2000 by the British artist Lucian Freud. The top left section of this painting has been 'grafted' on to the main section below, and closer inspection reveals a horizontal line where these two sections were joined.

The crease where the two parts of the painting were joined is visible as a faint horizontal line running through the woman just above the tray she is carrying.

The painting is one in a select group of canvases where Freud engages in a dialogue with past masters, this work being a variation on a theme of the work L'Après-midi à Naples ('Afternoon in Naples'; circa 1875) by the French Post-Impressionist painter Paul Cézanne.

In 2001 the work was purchased by the National Gallery of Australia in Canberra, which also owns Cézanne's L'Après-midi à Naples, for $7.4 million. The decision was somewhat controversial at the time, but this perception changed in 2008, when Freud's painting Benefits Supervisor Sleeping sold for "just under [...] $35 million."

== See also ==
- 2000 in art
