= Deadly Awards 2011 =

The 2011 Deadly Awards were hosted by Aaron Pedersen and Casey Donovan at the Sydney Opera House on 27 September 2011. Shellie Morris, the Yanyuwa Singers and the Gondwana National Indigenous Children's Choir all performed at the ceremony. The Awards program were broadcast on nationally on SBS TV in October. The event was an annual celebration of Australian Aboriginal and Torres Strait Islander achievement in music, sport, entertainment and community.

== Lifetime Achievement ==
- Ella Award for Lifetime Achievement in Aboriginal and Torres Strait Islander Sport: Evonne Goolagong Cawley
- Jimmy Little Award for Lifetime Achievement in Aboriginal and Torres Strait Music: Col Hardy

== Music ==
- Single Release of the Year: The Last Kinection - "Happy People"
- Album Release of the Year: Gurrumul Yunupingu - Rrakala
- Male Artist of the Year: Gurrumul Yunupingu
- Female Artist of the Year: Jessica Mauboy
- Band of the Year: The Last Kinection
- Most Promising New Talent in Music: Iwantja

== Sport ==
- Sportsman of the Year: Patrick Mills, basketball
- Sportswoman of the Year: Rohanee Cox, basketball
- Outstanding Achievement in AFL: Andrew Walker
- Outstanding Achievement in NRL: Johnathan Thurston
- Most Promising New Talent in Sport: Tanisha Stanton, netball

== The arts ==
- Film of the Year: Mad Bastards
- TV Show of the Year: Living Black, SBS
- Male Actor of the Year: Aaron Pedersen, City Homicide
- Female Actor of the Year: Deborah Mailman, Offspring
- Outstanding Achievement in Literature: Anita Heiss for Paris Dreaming
- Dancer of the Year: Kathy Balngayngu Marika
- Visual Artist of the Year: Michael Cook

== Community ==
- Outstanding Achievement in Aboriginal and Torres Strait Islander Health: NPY Women's Council – “No Safe Amount – The Effects of Alcohol in Pregnancy”, Alice Springs NT
- Aboriginal and Torres Strait Islander Health Worker of the Year - Muriel Jaragba, Aboriginal Mental Health Worker, Groote Eylandt NT
- Outstanding Achievement in Aboriginal and Torres Strait Islander Employment: Brian Dowd – Black on Track, NSW
- Broadcaster of the Year: Karla Hart – Noongar Radio, 100.9FM Perth WA
- Outstanding Achievement in Aboriginal and Torres Strait Islander Education: Deadly Ute Project – Goolum Goolum Aboriginal Co-operative through Wimmera Hub, Horsham VIC
