= Western Australian Indigenous Art Awards =

Art awards for works by Aboriginal Australians and Torres Strait Islanders, 2008-2015

The Western Australian Indigenous Art Awards was a non-acquisitive art award established by the Art Gallery of Western Australia and funded by the Government of Western Australia from 2008 to 2015, to support and encourage Indigenous Australian artists.

It included three prizes: an overall prize of A$50,000, the Western Australian Indigenous Art Award; A$10,000 prize for the top Western Australian artist, Western Australian Artist Award; and a A$5,000 People's Choice Award. Entry was open to "all adult Aboriginal and Torres Strait Islander artists currently living in Australia, working in any theme or media, including (but not restricted to) painting on bark, canvas and paper, prints, sculpture, fibre art, ceramics, glass, photography, and digital media".

== Past winners ==
In 2008, Patrick Tjungurrayi won the main prize and June Walkutjukurr won the WA Artist prize, and the People's Choice award was won by Shane Pickett.

The 2009 winner of the main prize was Torres Strait Islander man Ricardo Idagi; the Western Australian prize winner was Wakartu Cory Surprise.

In 2015, Quandamooka artist Megan Cope won the main prize for her video installation The Blaktism, while Vincent Namatjira was one of the finalists.
