= National Gallery of Australia =

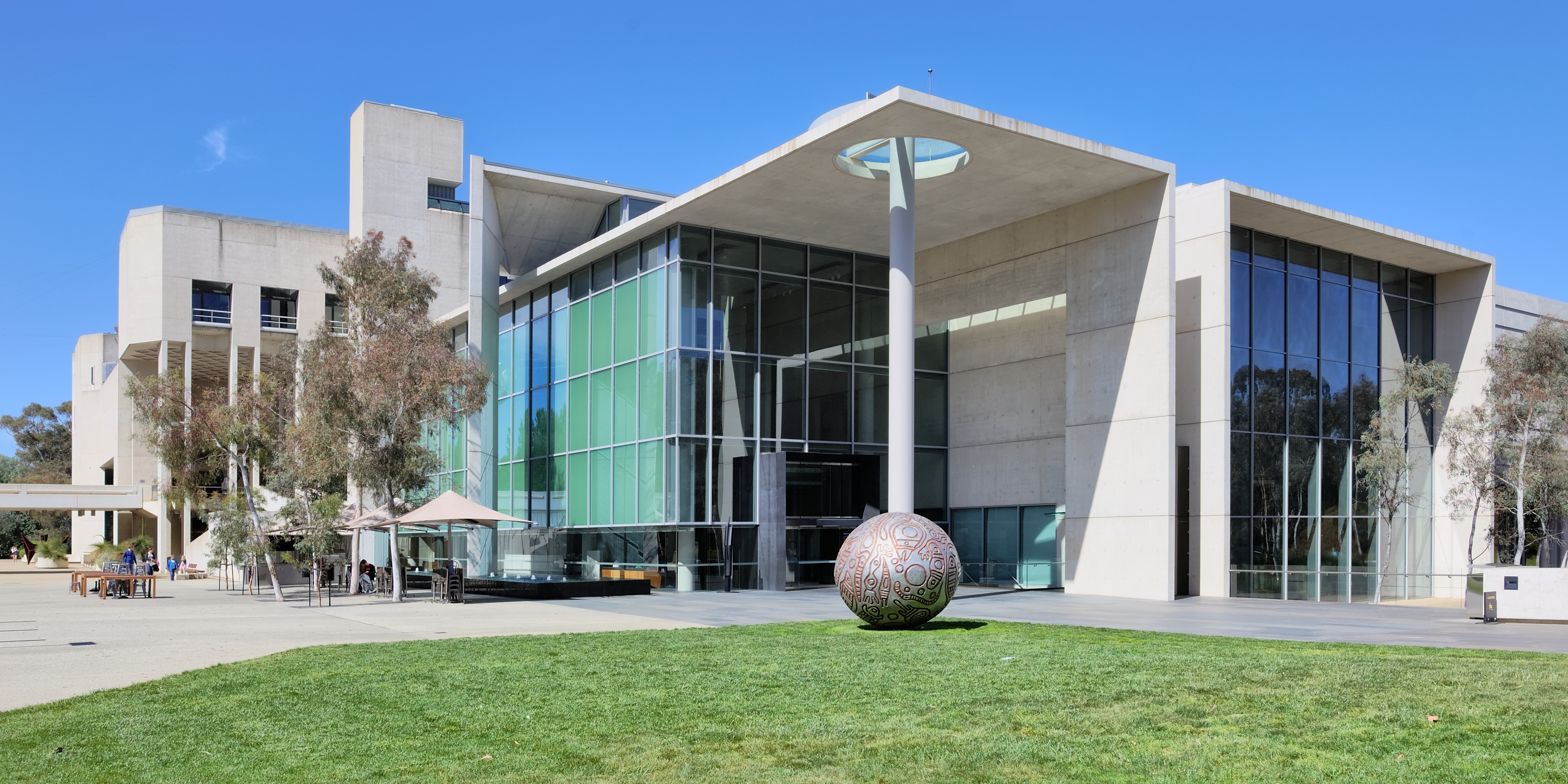
- Image taken from the south-west
- Interactive fullscreen map
- Former name: Australian National Gallery
- Established: 1967; 59 years ago
- Location: Ngunnawal and Ngambri Country, Parkes, Canberra, Australia
- Coordinates: 35°18′01″S 149°08′11″E
- Type: Art gallery
- Director: Nick Mitzevich
- Architect: Colin Madigan
- Owner: Australian Government
- Public transit access: ACTION buses (R2 & R6)
- Website: nga.gov.au

The National Gallery of Australia (NGA), formerly the Australian National Gallery, is the national art museum of Australia and one of the largest art museums in Australia, holding more than 166,000 works of art. Located in Canberra in the Australian Capital Territory, it was established in 1967 by the Australian Government as a national public art museum. As of 2022 it is under the directorship of Nick Mitzevich.

== Establishment ==
Prominent Australian artist Tom Roberts had lobbied various Australian prime ministers, starting with the first, Edmund Barton. Prime Minister Andrew Fisher accepted the idea in 1910, and the following year Parliament established a bipartisan committee of six political leaders—the Historic Memorials Committee. The Committee decided that the government should collect portraits of Australian governors-general, parliamentary leaders and the principal "fathers" of federation to be painted by Australian artists. This led to the establishment of what became known as the Commonwealth Art Advisory Board, which was responsible for art acquisitions until 1973. Nevertheless, the Parliamentary Library Committee also collected paintings for the Australian collections of the Commonwealth Parliamentary Library, including landscapes, notably the acquisition of Tom Roberts' Allegro con brio, Bourke St West in 1918. Prior to the opening of the Gallery these paintings were displayed around Parliament House, in Commonwealth offices, including diplomatic missions overseas, and State Galleries.

From 1912, the building of a permanent building to house the collection in Canberra was the major priority of the Commonwealth Art Advisory Board. However, this period included two World Wars and a Depression and governments always considered they had more pressing priorities, including building the initial infrastructure of Canberra and Old Parliament House in the 1920s and the rapid expansion of Canberra and the building of government offices, Lake Burley Griffin and the National Library of Australia in the 1950s and early 1960s. In 1965 the Commonwealth Art Advisory Board was finally able to persuade Prime Minister Robert Menzies to take the steps necessary to establish the gallery. On 1 November 1967, Prime Minister Harold Holt formally announced that the Government would construct the building.

=== Location ===
The design of the building was complicated by the difficulty in finalising its location, which was affected by the layout of the Parliamentary Triangle. The main problem was the final site of the new Parliament House. In Canberra's original Griffin 1912 plan, Parliament House was to be built on Camp Hill, between Capital Hill and the Provisional Parliament House and a Capitol was to be built on top of Capital Hill. He envisaged the Capitol to be "either a general administration structure for popular receptions and ceremony or for housing archives and commemorating Australian Achievements". In the early 1960s, the National Capital Development Commission (NCDC) proposed, in accordance with the 1958 and 1964 Holford plans for the Parliamentary Triangle, that the site for the new Parliament House be moved to the shore of Lake Burley Griffin, with a vast National Place, to be built on its south side, to be surrounded by a large mass of buildings. The Gallery would be built on Capital Hill, along with other national cultural institutions.

In 1968, Colin Madigan of Edwards Madigan Torzillo and Partners won the competition for the design, even though no design could be finalised, as the final site was now in doubt. Prime Minister John Gorton stated that,

"The Competition had as its aim not a final design for the building but rather the selection of a vigorous and imaginative architect who would then be commissioned to submit the actual design of the Gallery."

Gorton proposed to Parliament in 1968 that it endorse Holford's lakeside site for the new Parliament House, but it refused and sites at Camp Hill and Capital Hill were then investigated. As a result, the Government decided that the Gallery could not be built on Capital Hill. In 1971, the Government selected a 17-hectare (42-acre) site on the eastern side of the proposed National Place, between King Edward Terrace and for the Gallery. Even though it was now unlikely that the lakeside Parliament House would proceed, a raised National Place (to hide parking stations) surrounded by national institutions and government offices was still planned. Madigan's brief included the Gallery, a building for the High Court of Australia and the precinct around them, linking to the raised National Place at the centre of the Land Axis of the Parliamentary Triangle, which then led to the National Library on the western side.

=== Development of the design ===
Madigan's final design was based on a brief prepared by the National Capital Development Commission (NCDC) with input from James Johnson Sweeney and James Mollison. Sweeney was director of the Guggenheim Museum between 1952–1960 and director of The Museum of Fine Arts, Houston and had been appointed as a consultant to advise on issues concerning the display and storage of art. Mollison said in 1989 that "the size and form of the building had been determined between Colin Madigan and J.J. Sweeney, and the National Capital Development Commission. I was not able to alter the appearance of the interior or exterior in any way...It's a very difficult building in which to make art look more important than the space in which you put the art". The construction of the building commenced in 1973, with the unveiling of a plaque by Prime Minister Gough Whitlam. Construction was managed by P.D.C. Constructions under the supervision of the National Capital Development Commission and it was officially opened by Queen Elizabeth II in 1982, during the premiership of Whitlam's successor, Malcolm Fraser. The building cost $82 million.

In 1975, the NCDC abandoned the plan for the National Place, leaving the precinct five metres above the natural ground level, without the previously proposed connections to national institutions and next to a vast space only partially taken up by Reconciliation Place, which does not substitute for the grand mass of buildings originally envisaged.

=== Appointment of an acting director ===
The Commonwealth Art Advisory Board recommended that Laurie Thomas, a former director of the Art Gallery of Western Australia and of the Queensland Art Gallery be appointed director, but the Prime Minister John Gorton took no action on this recommendation, as he apparently favoured the appointment of James Johnson Sweeney, although he was already 70.

James Mollison was exhibitions officer in the Prime Minister's Department from 1969 and the Government's failure to appoint a director of the National Gallery of Australia required Mollison to become involved in the development of the design for the building with the architects led by Colin Madigan. In November 1970, the Commonwealth Art Advisory Board recommended that he should be re-designated as assistant director (development). In May 1971, following Gorton's fall from power, the Government endorsed Madigan's sketches for the building. The new prime minister, William McMahon announced the appointment of Mollison as acting director of the National Gallery of Australia in October 1971. Tenders for construction were called in November 1972, just before the McMahon government's defeat in the December 1972 election.

== Building and garden ==
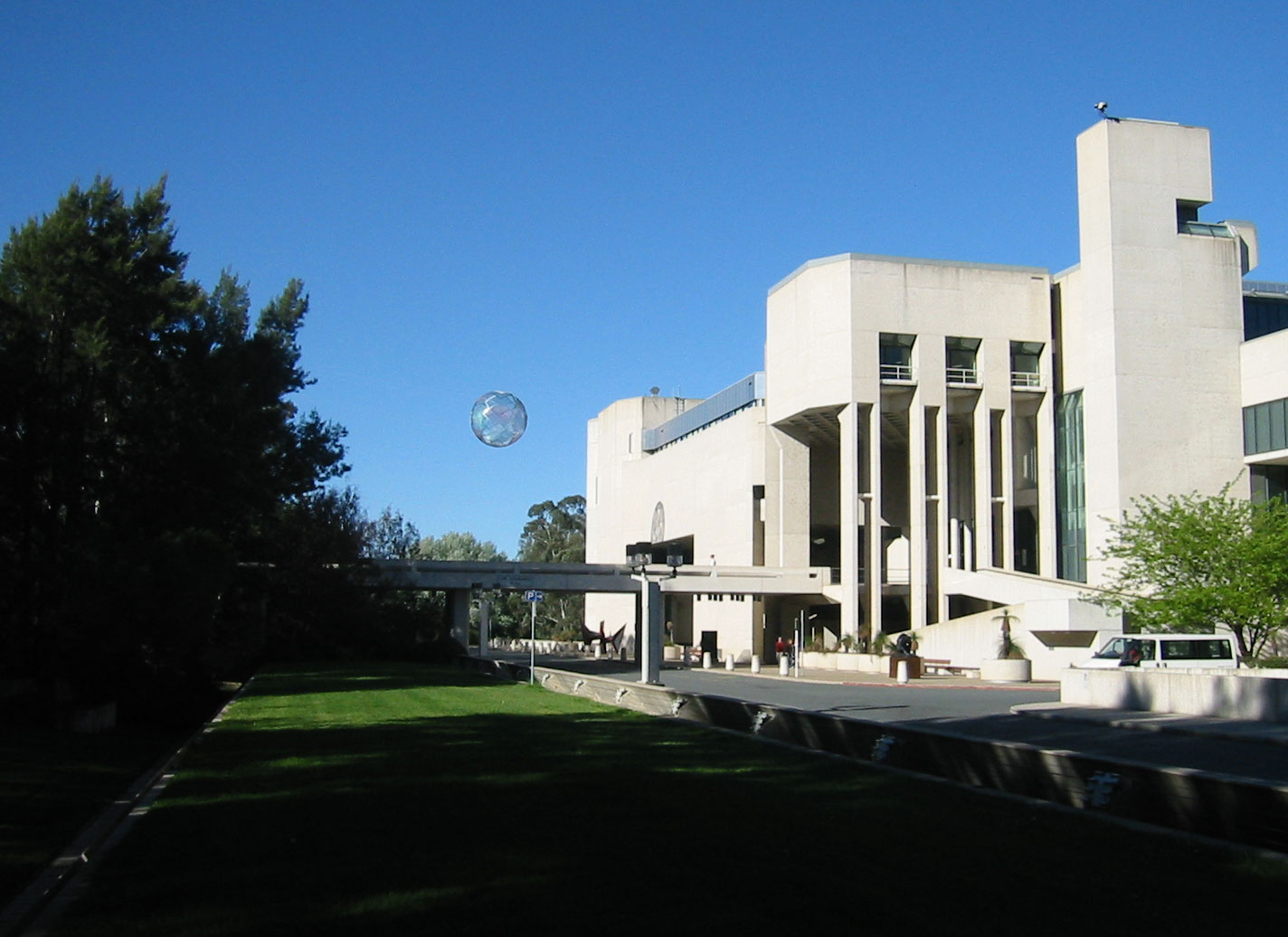
Prior to renovations, in 2004

The National Gallery building is in the late 20th-century Brutalist style. It is characterised by angular masses and raw concrete surfaces and is surrounded by a series of sculpture gardens planted with Australian native plants and trees.

The geometry of the building is based on a triangle, most obviously manifested for visitors in the coffered ceiling grids and tiles of the principal floor. Madigan said of this device that it was "the intention of the architectural concept to implant into the grammar of the design a sense of freedom so that the building could be submitted to change and variety but would always express its true purpose". This geometry flows throughout the building, and is reflected in the triangular stair towers, columns and building elements.

The building is principally constructed of reinforced bush hammered concrete, which was also originally the interior wall surface. More recently, the interior walls have been covered with painted wood, to allow for increased flexibility in the display of artworks.

The building has 23,000 m^{2} of floor space. The design provides space for both the display and storage of works of art and to accommodate the curatorial and support staff of the Gallery. Madigan's design is based on Sweeney's recommendation that there should be a spiral plan, with a succession of galleries to display works of art of differing sizes and to allow flexibility in the way in which they were to be exhibited.

There are three levels of galleries. On the principal floor, the galleries are large, and are used to display the Indigenous Australian and International (meaning European and American) collections. The bottom level also contains a series of large galleries, originally intended to house sculpture, but now used to display the Asian art collection. The topmost level contains a series of smaller, more intimate galleries, which are now used to display the Gallery's collection of Australian art. Sweeney had recommended that sources of natural light should not detract from the collections, and so light sources are intended to be indirect.

The High Court and National Gallery Precinct were added to the Australian National Heritage List in November 2007.

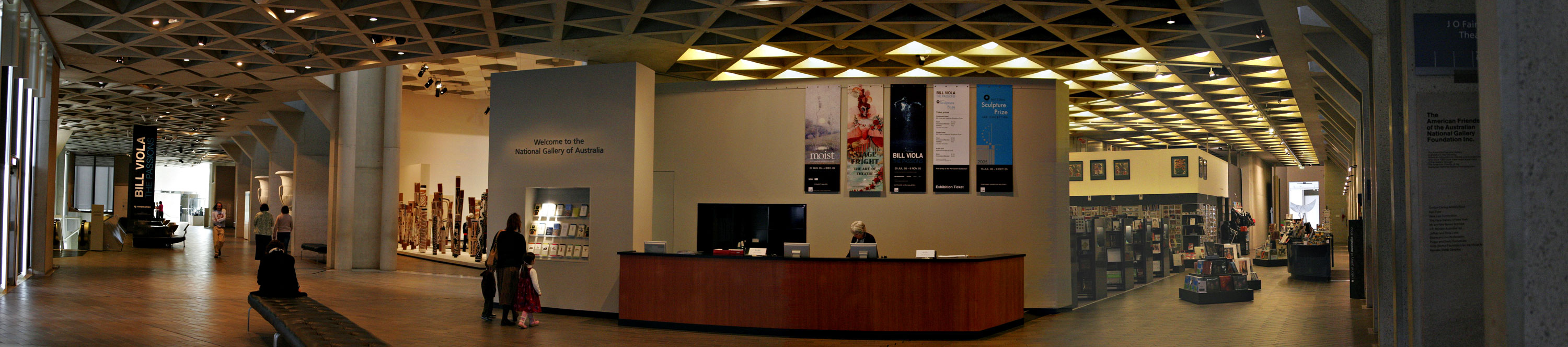
Lobby area of the National Gallery of Australia in 2005, before the major extension completed in 2010.

=== Later extensions ===
The Gallery has been extended twice, the first of which was the building of new temporary exhibition galleries on the eastern side of the building in 1997, to house large-scale temporary exhibitions, which was designed by Andrew Andersons of PTW Architects. This extension includes a sculptural garden, designed by Fiona Hall. The 2006 enhancement project and new entrance was complemented by a large Australian Garden designed by Adrian McGregor of McGregor Coxall Landscape Architecture and Urban Design.

There have also been proposals, during the tenure of Director Brian Kennedy, for the construction of a new "front" entrance, facing King Edward Terrace. Madigan made known his concerns about these proposals and their interference with his moral rights as the architect and also expressed concerns about these changes. A former director, Betty Churcher, was particularly critical of Madigan, and told a journalist that "the dead hand of an architect cannot stay clamped on a building forever". When Ron Radford became director, he expanded the brief to include a suite of new galleries to display the collection of indigenous art and a new Australian Garden fronting King Edward Terrace.

The Minister for the Arts and Sport, Senator Rod Kemp, announced on 13 December 2006 that the Australian Government would provide $92.9 million for a major building enhancement project at the National Gallery of Australia, including around $20 million for previously approved building refurbishments. The building enhancements were designed to create new arrival and entrance facilities to improve public access to the Gallery's building and significantly increase display space, particularly for the collection of Australian Indigenous art. Stage 1 of the Indigenous galleries and new entrance project was officially opened on 30 September 2010 by Quentin Bryce, Governor-General of Australia. According to well-known architecture critic Elizabeth Farrelly, the new extension had three main tasks: "how to dock amicably with the existing architecture; how to provide the resulting whole with a new street "address"; how to create a logical, legible and deferential hanging space for the collection."

=== Sculpture garden renewal and Ouroboros ===
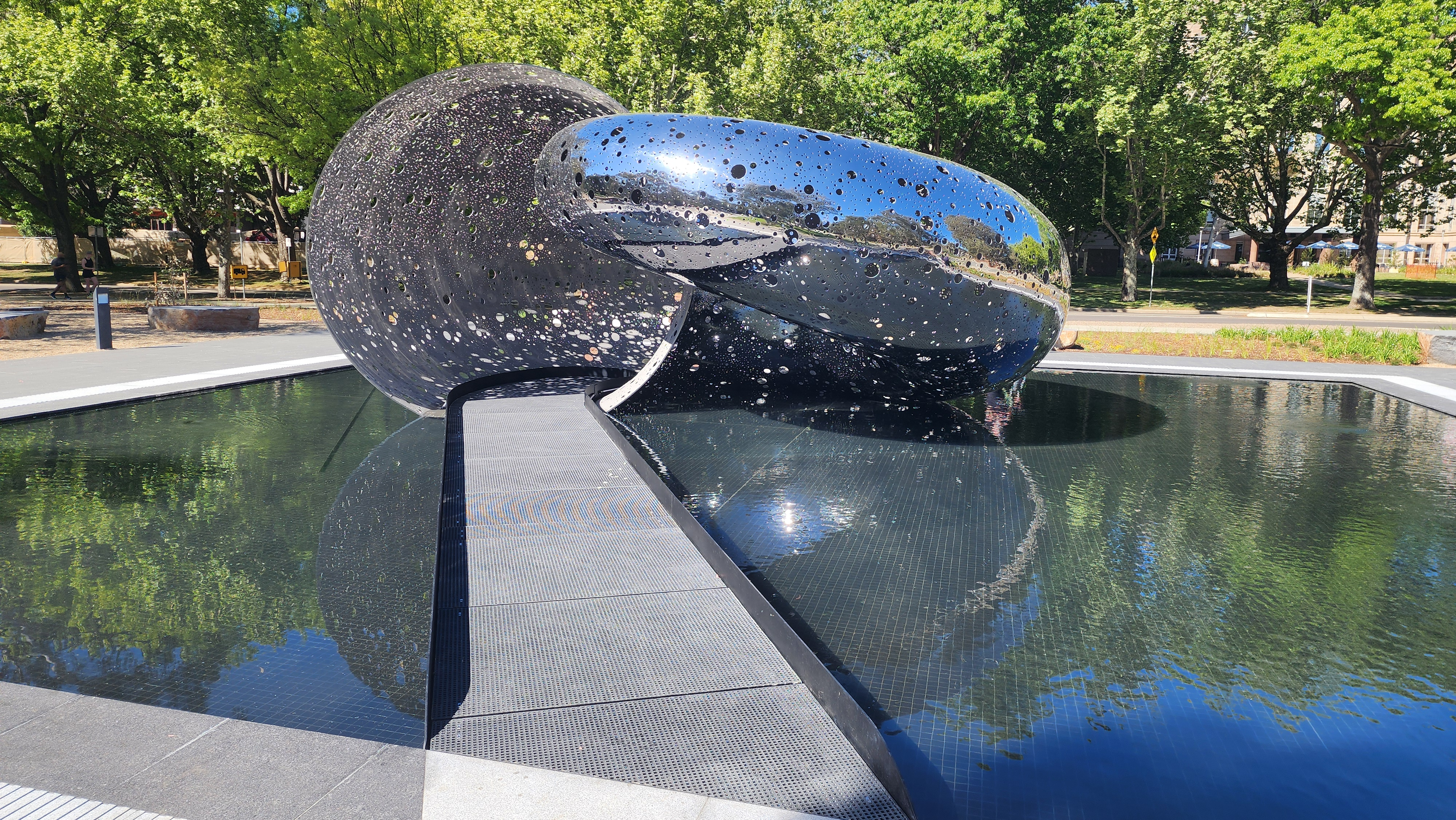
Ouroboros, Canberra

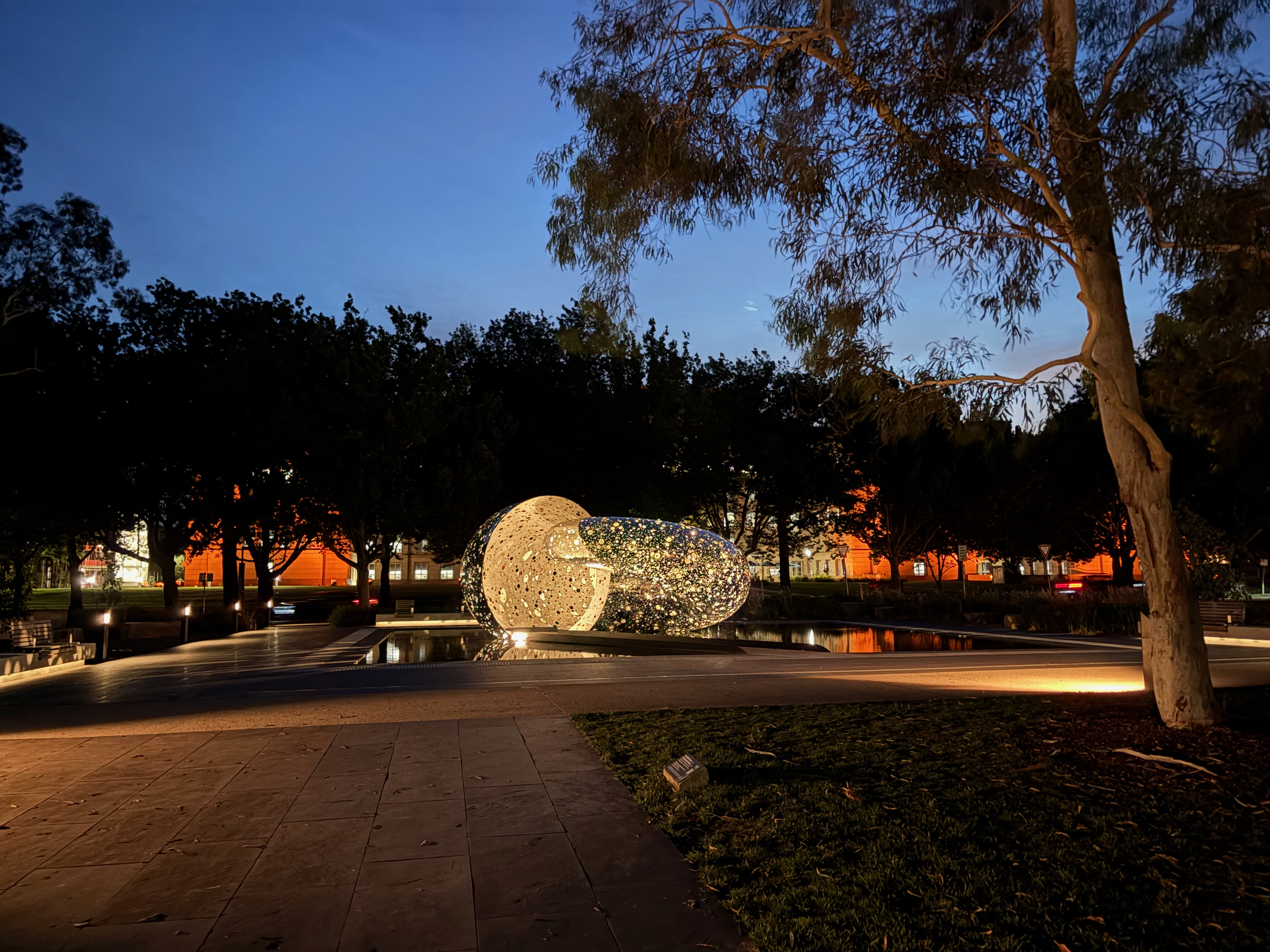
Ouroboros Twilight

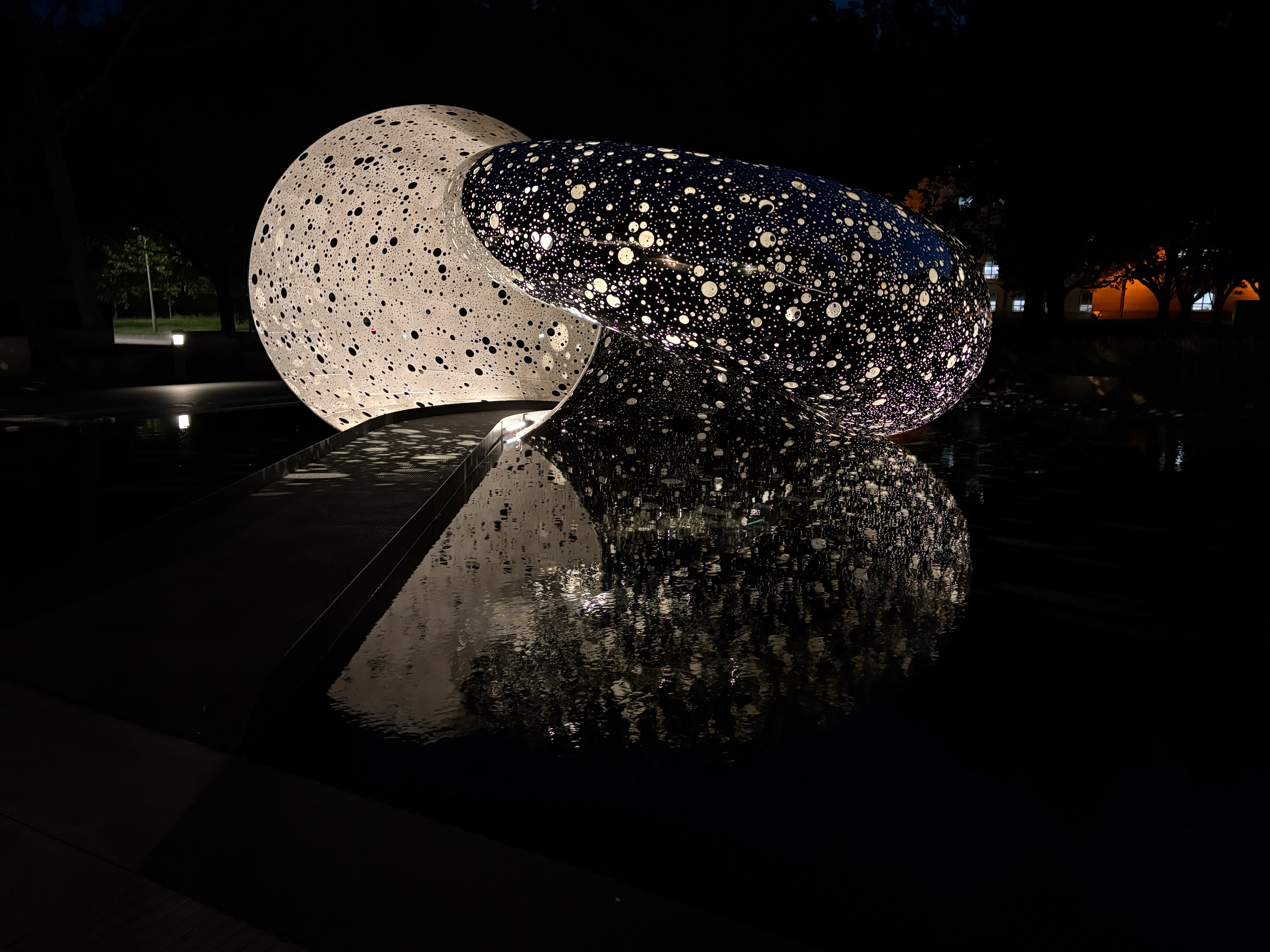
Ouroboros Night

A project for the renewal of the sculpture garden was under way as of 2021. As part of the project, in September 2021 the gallery under director Nick Mitzevich commissioned a huge sculpture by Lindy Lee, 4 m (13 ft) high and based on the ouroboros (an ancient symbol depicting a snake eating its own tail), to be placed near its main entrance of the gallery. Unveiled in October 2024, the sculpture is the NGA's most expensive commission to date. Two art critics criticised the purchase in 2021: John McDonald of The Sydney Morning Herald thought that the money could have been better spent filling some significant gaps in its collection, while Christopher Allen concurred, and thought that it merely "offer[s] a passive experience to audiences who are unwilling or unable to engage more actively with works of art" and that "$14m is an absurd price for a work of debatable value by an artist of modest standing".

== Directorship ==
In 1976, the newly established ANG Council advertised for a permanent director to fill the position that James Mollison had been acting in since 1971. The new prime minister Malcolm Fraser announced the appointment of Mollison as director in 1977.

=== James Mollison ===
James Mollison is notable for establishing the Gallery and building on the collection that had already been assembled of mainly Australian paintings by purchasing icons of modern western art, the best known were the 1974 purchases of Blue Poles by Jackson Pollock ($1.3m), and Woman V by Willem de Kooning ($650,000). These purchases were very controversial at the time, but are now generally considered to be visionary acquisitions.

Mollison also built up the other collections, often with the help of donations. Ian North was appointed Foundation Curator of Photography in 1980. Mollison secured funding from Philip Morris to acquire contemporary Australian photography for the ANG.

Contemporary Australian artists were given greater representation during this period. In 1975, Arthur Boyd presented several thousand of his works to the Gallery. In 1977 Mollison persuaded Sunday Reed to donate Sidney Nolan's remarkable Ned Kelly series to the ANG. Nolan had long disputed Reed's ownership of these paintings, but the donation resolved their dispute. In 1981, Albert Tucker and his wife presented a substantial collection of Tucker's collection to the Gallery. As a result of these and more recent donation, it has the finest collection of Australian art in existence.

He also arranged many touring exhibitions, most famously The Great Impressionist Exhibition of 1984.

His successor, Betty Churcher has said that when she took over in 1990, he "was of almost legendary stature [and] had single-handedly built a great and comprehensive collection from the ground up; indeed he had presided over the collection for more than twenty years with great flair, and over the institution for seven years — it was in the truest sense, his Gallery, his professional achievement."

=== Betty Churcher ===
Betty Churcher became director in 1990. She had been formerly director of the Art Gallery of Western Australia. While director of the National Gallery, she was dubbed "Betty Blockbuster" because of her love of blockbuster exhibitions.

Churcher initiated the building of new galleries on the eastern side of the building, opened in March 1998, to house large-scale temporary exhibitions. It was under her directorship that the name of the Gallery was changed from the Australian National Gallery to its current title.

During her period, the Gallery purchased, among many other artworks, Golden Summer, Eaglemont by Arthur Streeton for $3.5 million. This was the last great Heidelberg School painting still in private hands.

=== Brian Kennedy ===
Brian Kennedy was appointed director in 1997. He expanded the traveling exhibitions and loans program throughout Australia, arranged for several major shows of Australian art abroad, increased the number of exhibitions at the museum itself and oversaw the development of an extensive multi-media site. On the other hand, he discontinued the emphasis of his predecessor, Churcher, of showing blockbuster exhibitions.

During his directorship, the National Gallery of Australia gained government support for improving the building and significant private donations and corporate sponsorship. Private funding supported his notable acquisitions of David Hockney's A Bigger Grand Canyon for $4.6 million in 1999, Lucian Freud's After Cézanne for $7.4 million in 2001 and Pregnant Woman by Ron Mueck for $800,000.

He also introduced free admission to the gallery, except to major exhibitions. He campaigned for the construction of a new front entrance to the Gallery, facing King Edward Terrace, but this did not come to pass during his tenure.

Kennedy's cancellation of the Sensation exhibition (scheduled at the National Gallery of Australia from 2 June 2000 to 13 August 2000) was controversial, as it was seen by many as censorship. This exhibition was created by the Young British Artists of the Saatchi Gallery. Its most controversial work was Chris Ofili's The Holy Virgin Mary, a painting which used elephant dung and was accused of being blasphemous. The then Mayor of New York, Rudolph Giuliani campaigned against the exhibition, claiming it was "Catholic-bashing" and an "aggressive vicious, disgusting attack on religion." In November 1999, Kennedy cancelled the exhibition and stated that the events in New York had "obscured discussion of the artistic merit of the works of art."

Kennedy was also repeatedly under attack over allegations that the air-conditioning was exposing its staff to cancer. Despite his denials that there was any problem with the air-conditioning, claims that the issue had been 'swept under the carpet' persisted. The air-conditioning was finally renovated in 2003. Kennedy announced that he would not seek extension of his contract in 2002. He has denied that he was under any government pressure to do so.

=== Ron Radford ===
Ron Radford was appointed director in late 2004. He was formerly director of the Art Gallery of South Australia.

Radford has lent out the Gallery's old masters collection (European art, prior to the 19th century) for long-term display to state galleries, noting that he "considers the collection of less than 30 paintings, put together by Mollison to give context to the modern collection, as too small to make any impact on the public". He has been quoted as saying that the gallery should concentrate on its strengths – European art of the first half of the 20th century, 20th-century American art, photography, Asian art and the 20th-century drawing collection, and to fill the gaps in the Australian collection.

In September 2005, there was considerable publicity about an offer to the gallery of Sketch for Deluge II by Wassily Kandinsky for $35 million. The gallery did not subsequently go through with the purchase.

Radford has been notable in securing funding and completing the building of the new entrance to the Gallery as well as an extension for Indigenous galleries, public and function areas. In developing the collection he has been notable for a series of acquisitions of indigenous art, in particular the largest collection of watercolours by Albert Namatjira and the James Turrell sculpture and installation Within without (2010).

=== Gerard Vaughan ===
In October 2014, it was announced that Gerard Vaughan would be the new director of the National Gallery of Australia from 10 November. He was formerly director of the National Gallery of Victoria from 1999 to 2012.

In 2014, the gallery sued antiquities dealer Subhash Kapoor in New York Supreme Court for allegedly hiding evidence that an 11th-century sculpture of Shiva Nataraja known as the Sripuranthan Natarajan Idol, bought by the gallery for A$5.6 million in 2008, had been stolen from an Indian temple in Tamil Nadu. The National Gallery voluntarily removed a bronze statue of the Dancing Shiva from display, as the Indian government formally requested the statue's return.

=== Nick Mitzevich ===
In April 2018, it was announced that Nick Mitzevich, the third NGA director to be appointed from the Art Gallery of South Australia, would take over at the start of July 2018. His term at the NGA has encountered several challenges: in January 2020 the gallery had to be shut because of smoke from bushfires and then again after a hailstorm. A couple of months later, the COVID pandemic struck, leading to a closure of over 70 days. In January 2021, Mitzevich had plans to re-hang the permanent collection, swapping the location of international art with that of Australian art.

== Controversies ==
In February 2025, the gallery ordered Palestinian flags to be covered up on an artwork displayed as part of the Te Paepae Aora’i – Where the Gods Cannot be Fooled exhibition. The artists stated they had reluctantly complied with the gallery's direction on threat of the work being removed, and described it as "censorship".

== Exhibitions and initiatives ==
=== Women Hold Up Half The Sky ===
Women Hold Up Half The Sky was a large exhibition held in March to April 1995, to celebrate International Women's Day. Named after Adelaide artist Ann Newmarch's famous print of the same name included in the exhibition, the exhibition was curated by Roger Butler. It was opened by Carmen Lawrence, and also included a travelling exhibition called Sydney by Design. The exhibition was part of the national commemoration of the UN's International Women's Year, and the accompanying book, The National Women's Art Book, was edited by Joan Kerr.

Comprising around 300 works from the gallery's own collection, the exhibition included the work of Agnes Goodsir, Bessie Davidson, Clarice Beckett, Olive Cotton, Grace Cossington Smith, Yvonne Audette, Janet Dawson, Lesley Dumbrell, Margaret Worth, Rosalie Gascoigne, Bea Maddock, Judy Watson, Frances Burke, Margaret Preston, Olive Ashworth, and other artists of the previous 150 years.

=== The Painters of the Wagilag Sisters story 1937-1997 ===
The exhibition The Painters of the Wagilag Sisters story 1937-1997 was a major exhibition of the work of more than 100 Aboriginal artists held in 1997, curated by Nigel Lendon and Tim Bonyhady. The artists were Yolngu painters from Arnhem Land in the Northern Territory, including senior member of the Rirratjingu clan Mawalan Marika as well as Ramingining artist Philip Gudthaykudthay (aka "Pussycat"). The artworks all related to the story of ancestral creator beings of Arnhem Land known as the Wagilag sisters.

=== National Indigenous Art Triennial ===
The NGA held the inaugural National Indigenous Art Triennial (NIAT), Culture Warriors, from 13 October 2007 to 10 February 2008. The guest curator was Brenda L Croft, Senior Curator, Aboriginal and Torres Strait Islander Art. The exhibition was the largest survey show of Indigenous art at the NGA in over 15 years, and featured works by selected artists created during the previous three years. A free exhibition, it featured artists from every state and territory.

The 2nd National Indigenous Art Triennial, unDISCLOSED, ran from May to July 2012 and featured 20 Indigenous artists, including Vernon Ah Kee, Julie Gough, Alick Tipoti, Christian Thompson, Lena Yarinkura, Michael Cook and Nyapanyapa Yunupingu. The theme alludes to "the spoken and the unspoken, the known and the unknown, what can be revealed and what cannot". The exhibition afterwards toured the country, shown at Cairns Regional Gallery, the Anne & Gordon Samstag Museum of Art in Adelaide and the Western Plains Cultural Centre in Dubbo, NSW.

The 3rd National Indigenous Art Triennial, Defying Empire, was held from 26 May to 10 September 2017, curated by Tina Baum, NGA Curator of Aboriginal and Torres Strait Islander Art. The title references the 50th anniversary of the 1967 referendum, that recognised Aboriginal and Torres Strait Islander people as Australians for the first time.

The 4th Triennial Ceremony, took place from 26 March to 31 July 2022. It explores the idea of ceremony, and is curated by Hetti Perkins.

The 5th National Indigenous Art Triennial, After the rain, was curated by artistic director Tony Albert, and featured ten large-scale multidisciplinary art installations. It took place at the NGA from 6 December 2025 until 26 April 2026, and subsequently toured the country, with its last scheduled showing at Orange Regional Gallery, Orange, NSW, in mid-2028.

=== Balnaves Contemporary Series ===
In 2018 the Balnaves Contemporary Intervention Series was launched, delivered in partnership with the Balnaves Foundation. The platform, later renamed to Balnaves Contemporary Series, commissions artists to create new work. Artists commissioned by this project include Jess Johnson and Simon Ward (2018); Sarah Contos (2018); Patricia Piccinini (Skywhales, 2020–21); Judy Watson and Helen Johnson; and Daniel Crooks (2022).

=== Know My Name ===
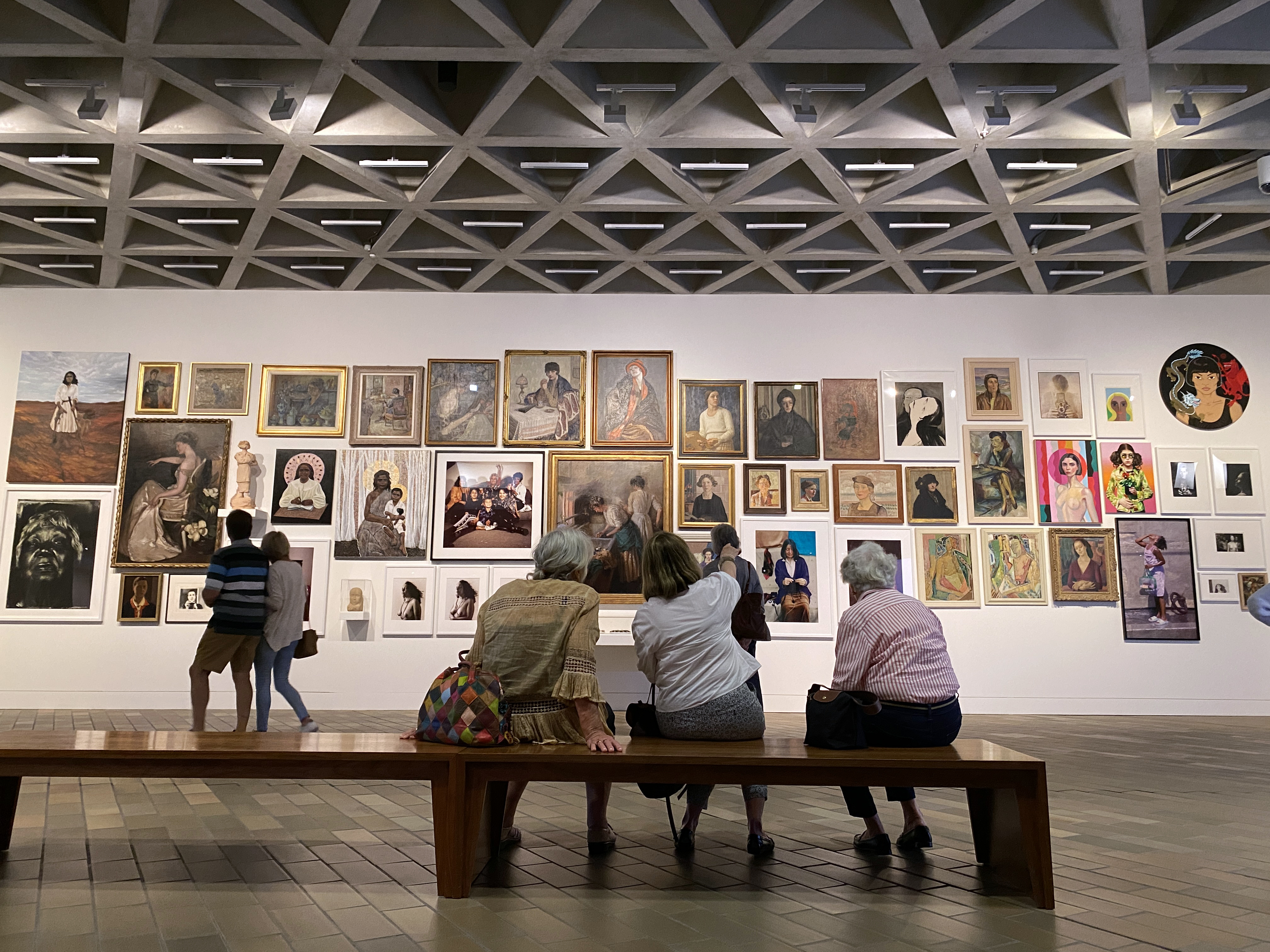
Know My Name exhibition, 2020

Know My Name is "an initiative of the National Gallery of Australia to celebrate the significant contributions of Australian women artists". Launched in 2019, after it was discovered that only 25 per cent of the gallery's collection was made by women through information from the Countess Report. These exhibitions feature exhibitions, events, commissions, creative collaborations, publications and partnerships that highlight the talent and work of women artists. As part of the program, the NGA also instigated a new set of principles to ensure gender parity in the organisation, programming and collections.

The exhibition Know My Name: Australian Women Artists 1900 to Now: Part One, held from 14 Nov 2020 to 9 May 2021, featured art made by women, drawn from the NGA's own collection as well as other institutions around Australia. Featured artists included Margaret Olley, Yvonne Koolmatrie, Tracey Moffatt, Emily Kame Kngwarreye, Mabel Juli, Rosemary Laing, Grace Cossington Smith, Thea Proctor, Betty Muffler, Stella Bowen, Dora Chapman, Fiona Foley, Brenda L. Croft, Discount Universe and many others. A book entitled Know My Name was published to accompany the exhibition in 2020. A four-day conference was held to coincide with the exhibition's opening.

Know My Name: Australian Women Artists 1900 to Now: Part Two was held from 12 June 2021 to 26 June 2022. The two exhibitions did not purport to be a complete account, but rather "[look] at moments in which women created new forms of art and cultural commentary such as feminism... [highlighting] creative and intellectual relationships between artists across time".

The National Gallery of Australia continues to exhibit Know My Name exhibitions each year, featuring Australian and international women artists.

=== Body Sculpture ===
In 2020 the gallery purchased American artist Jordan Wolfson's "Cube" for A$6.67 million, about half the museum's annual acquisition budget. The final transport and installation of the work was then delayed due to the COVID-19 pandemic; it was finally unveiled in 2023. Renamed Body Sculpture, the robotic artwork was the first solo presentation of Wolfson's work in Australia, and a world premiere of the work, on display alongside key works from the national collection selected by the artist from 9 December 2023 until 28 July 2024.

=== Sharing the National Collection ===
Sharing the National Collection is an initiative established in or before 2023, whereby some of the National Gallery's stored artworks are exhibited in regional galleries. Gallery M, a small gallery in the Adelaide suburb of Marion, is exhibiting some of the works moved there under this initiative, from March 2025 until March 2027.

=== Other exhibitions ===
- The Great Impressionist Exhibition (1984)
- Ken Tyler: Printer Extraordinary (1985)
- Angry Penguins and Realist Painting in Melbourne in the 1940s (1988)
- Under a Southern Sun (1988–89)
- Australian Decorative Arts, 1788–1900 (1988–89)
- Word as Image: 20th Century International Prints and Illustrated Books (1989)
- Rubens and the Italian Renaissance (1992)
- The Age of Angkor: Treasures from the National Museum of Cambodia (1992)
- Surrealism: Revolution by Night (1993)
- 1968 (1995)
- Turner (1996)
- Rembrandt: A Genius and his Impact (1997–98)
- New Worlds from Old: 19th Century Australian and American Landscapes (1998)
- An Impressionist Legacy: Monet to Moore, The Millennium Gift of Sara Lee Corporation (1999)
- Monet & Japan (2001)
- William Robinson: A Retrospective (2001–02)
- Rodin: A Magnificent Obsession, Sculpture and Drawings (2001–02)
- Margaret Preston, Australian Printmaker (2004–05)
- No Ordinary Place: The Art of David Malangi (2004)
- The Edwardians: Secrets and Desires (2004)
- Bill Viola: The Passions (2005)
- James Gleeson: Beyond the Screen of Sight (2005)
- Constable: Impressions of Land, Sea and Sky (2005)
- Imants Tillers: One world many visions (2006)
- George W. Lambert Retrospective: Heroes & Icons (2007)
- Turner to Monet: The Triumph of Landscape (2008)
- Degas: Master of French Art (2009)
- McCubbin: Last Impressions 1907–1917 (2009)
- Masterpieces from Paris (2010), on loan from Musée d'Orsay.
- Ballets Russes: The Art of Costume (2011)
- Renaissance: 15th & 16th Century Italian Paintings from the Accademia Carrara, Bergamo (2011–2012)
- Toulouse-Lautrec - Paris & the Moulin Rouge (2012–2013)
- Jeffrey Smart (2021–2022)
- Ngura Puḻka — Epic Country (2026) – Indigenous art from Aṉangu Pitjantjatjara Yankunytjatjara, Coober Pedy, and Tarntanya/Adelaide, South Australia

== NGA Youth Council ==
The National Gallery Youth Council is a group of young creatives recruited from across the country who represent and advocate for young people at the gallery. The group, aged between 15 and 25, meet online monthly and work with staff and artists to develop and deliver a variety of programs for young people.

== Collection ==
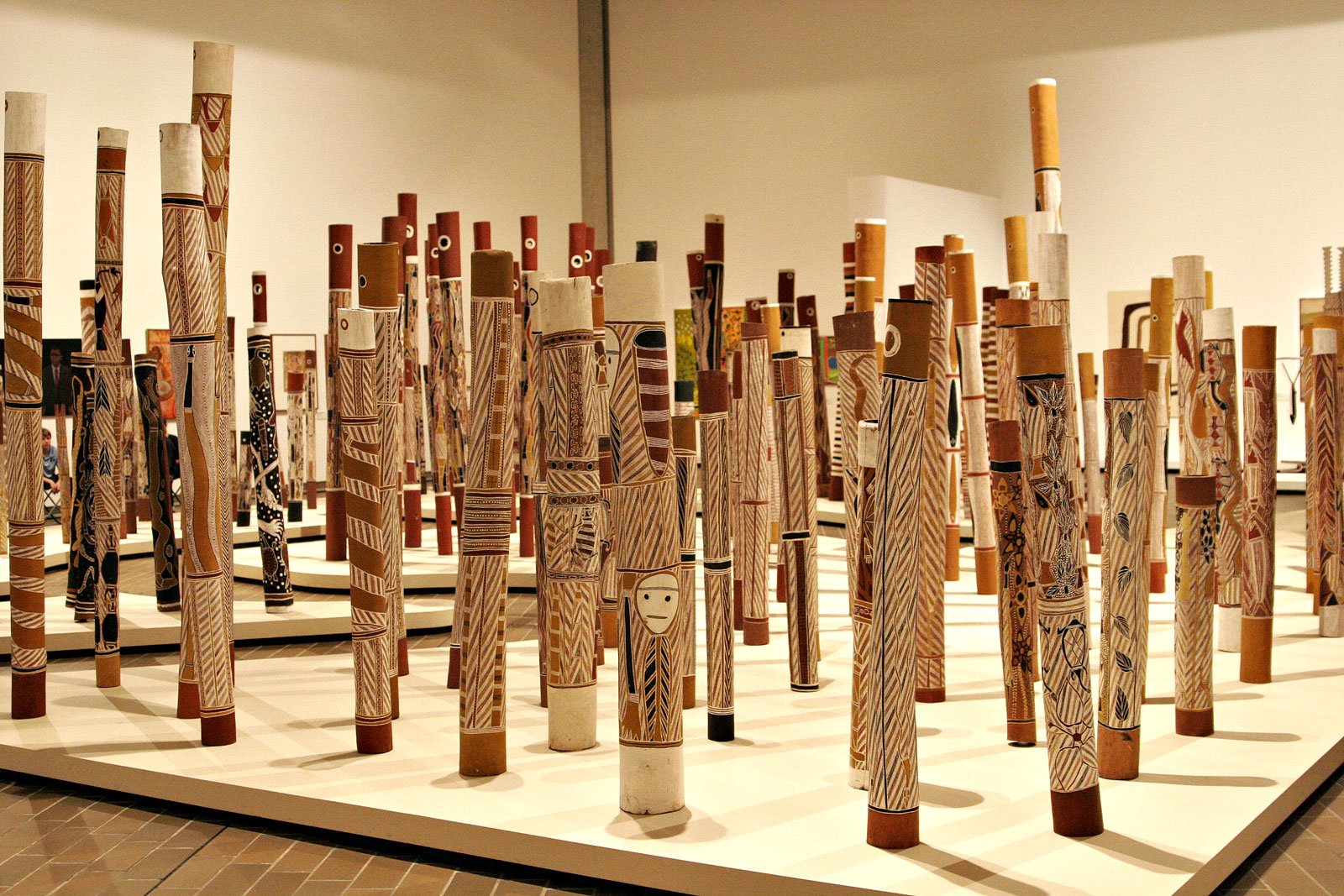
Ramingining Artists: The Aboriginal Memorial

The collection of the National Gallery of Australia held more than 166,000 works of art as of 2012. and includes:

- Australian art
  - Australian Aboriginal and Torres Strait Islander art (mostly recent, but in traditional forms)
  - Art in the European Tradition (from European settlement to the present day)
- Western art (from Medieval to Modern, mostly Modern)
- Eastern art (from South and East Asia, mostly traditional)
- Modern Art (international)
- Pacific Arts (from Melanesia and Polynesia mostly traditional)
- Photography (International & Australian)
- Crafts (dishes to dresses, international)
- Sculpture garden (Auguste Rodin to Modern)

=== Australian Aboriginal and Torres Strait Islander art ===
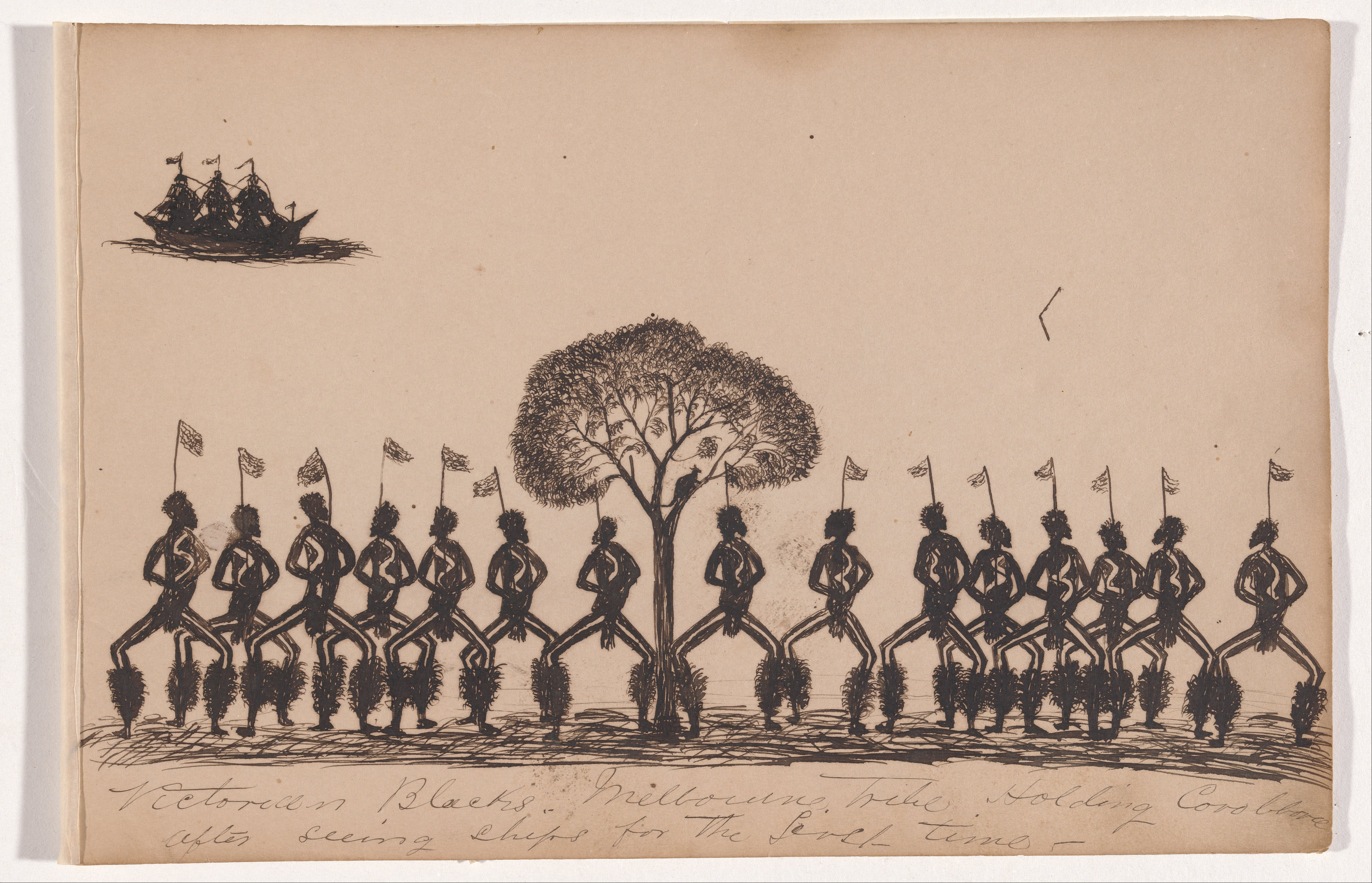
Tommy McRae, Melbourne tribe holding corroboree after seeing ships for the first time

This collection is dominated by the Aboriginal Memorial of 200 painted tree trunks commemorating all the indigenous people who had died between 1788 and 1988 defending their land against invaders. Each tree trunk is a dupun or log coffin, which is used to mark the safe tradition of the soul of the deceased from this world to the next. Artists from Ramingining painted it to mark the Australian Bicentenary and it was accepted for display by the Biennale of Sydney in 1988. Mollison agreed to purchase it for permanent display before its completion.

=== Australian art (non-indigenous) ===
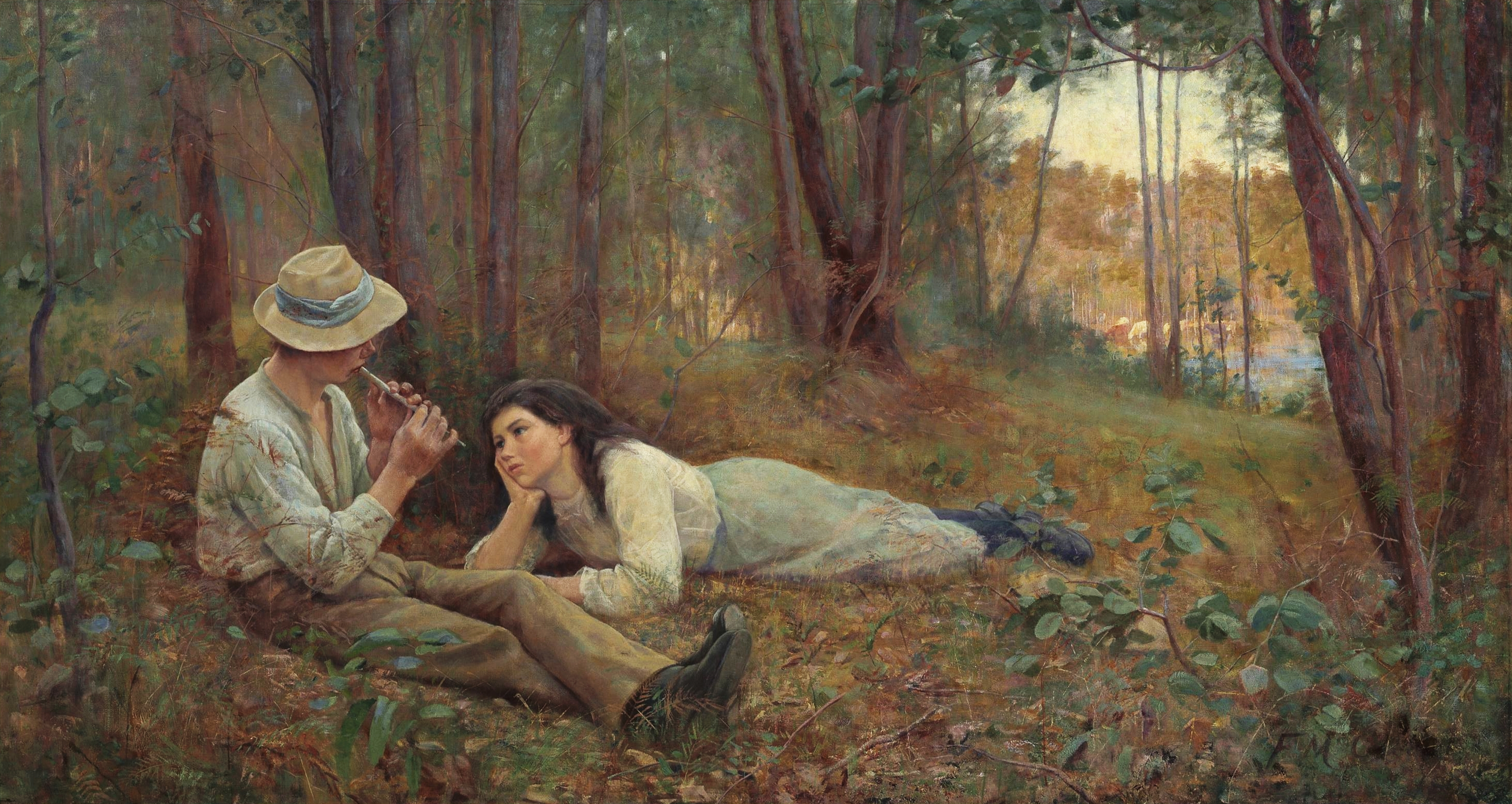
Frederick McCubbin, Bush Idyll, 1893

This includes works by:

- John Glover – Mount Wellington and Hobart Town from Kangaroo Point
- Frederick McCubbin – Afterglow, Bush Idyll (on long term loan from private collection)
- Tom Roberts – Going Home, Storm Clouds, In a corner on the Macintyre, An Australian Native, The Sculptor's Studio
- Arthur Streeton – From McMahons Point – Fare 1 Penny, The Selector's Hut, Golden Summer, Spirit of the Drought
- Charles Conder – The Yarra, Heidelberg, Bronte Beach, Under a Southern Sun
- Margaret Preston – Flying over the Shoalhaven River, Flapper
- Grace Cossington Smith – Interior in Yellow
- Lloyd Rees – A South Coast Road
- William Dobell – The Red Lady
- Albert Tucker – Pick up, Images of modern evil (collection), Victory Girls
- Russell Drysdale – The Drover's Wife, The Rabbiter and his Family
- Sidney Nolan – Ned Kelly, The Slip, The Burning Tree, Constable Fitzpatrick and Kate Kelly, Stringybark Creek, The Chase, Kelly Crossing the Bridge (and many other Ned Kelly paintings), Kiata, Head of a Soldier
- Arthur Boyd – The Mining Town, Boat Builders, Eden
- Joy Hester – Nude in Hat, Mother and Child
- John Perceval – Boy with Cat
- Ron Mueck – Pregnant Woman
- Patricia Piccinini – The Skywhale
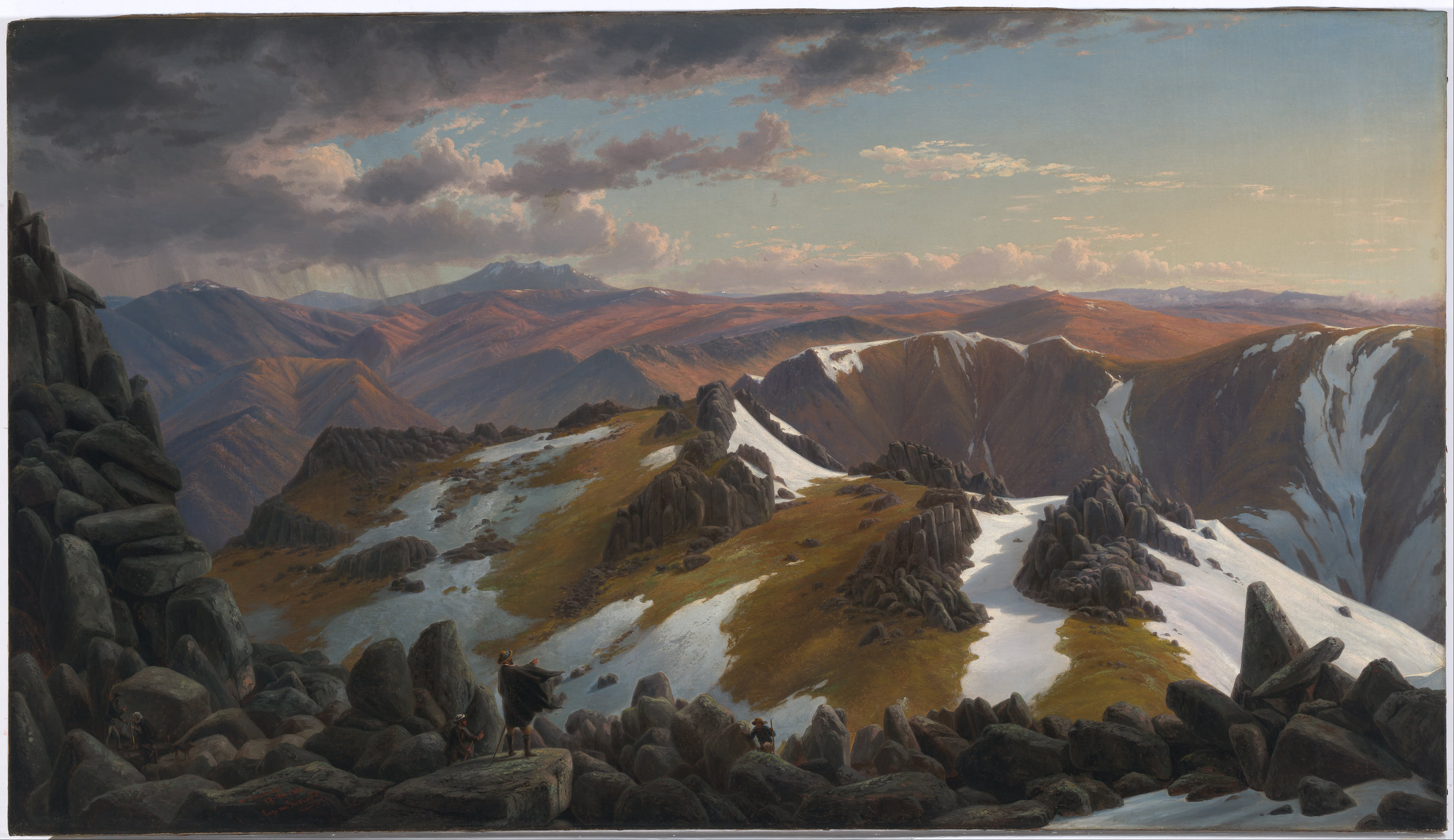
Eugene von Guerard, North-east view from the northern top of Mount Kosciusko, 1863

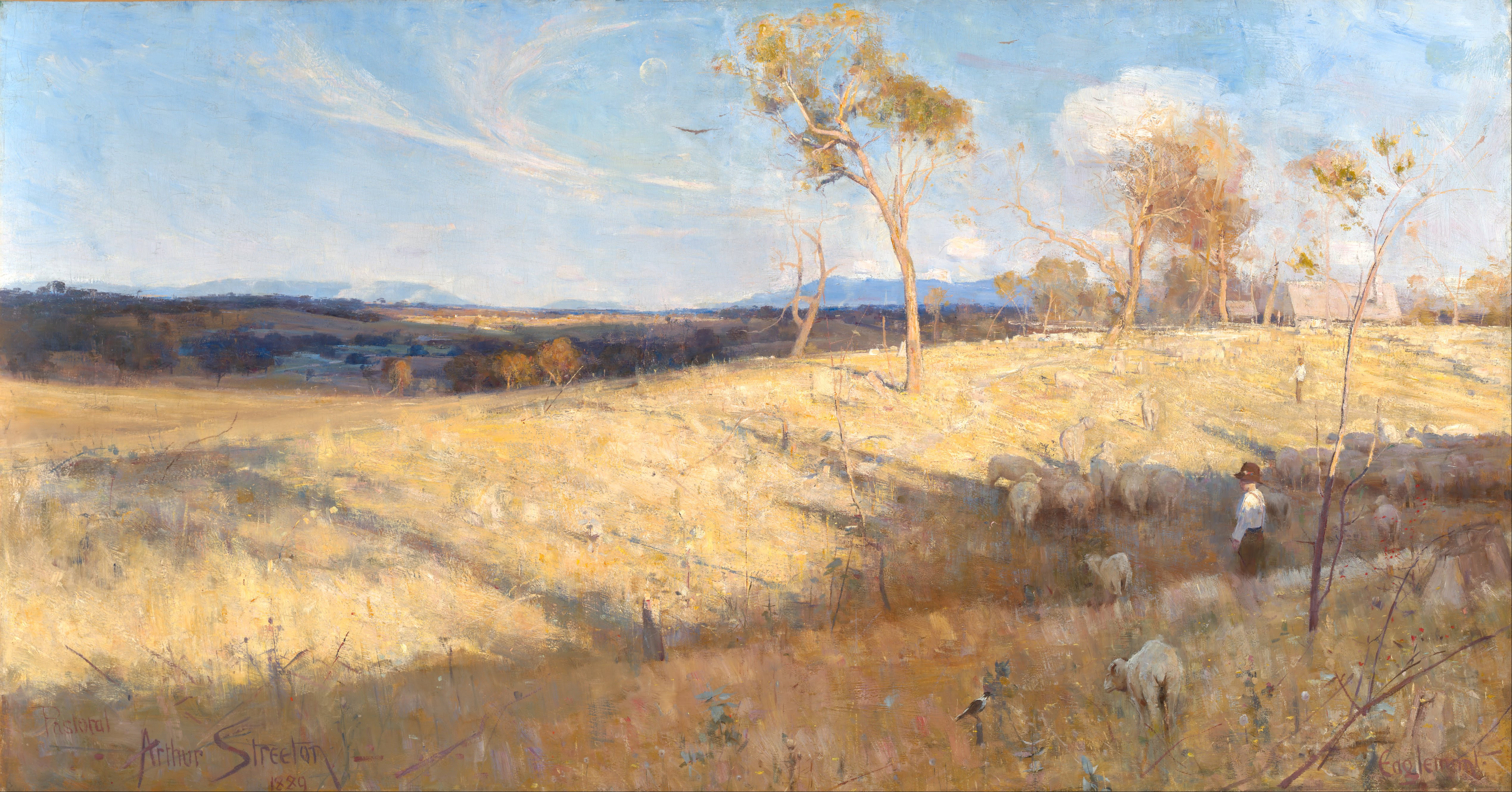
Arthur Streeton, Golden Summer, Eaglemont, 188

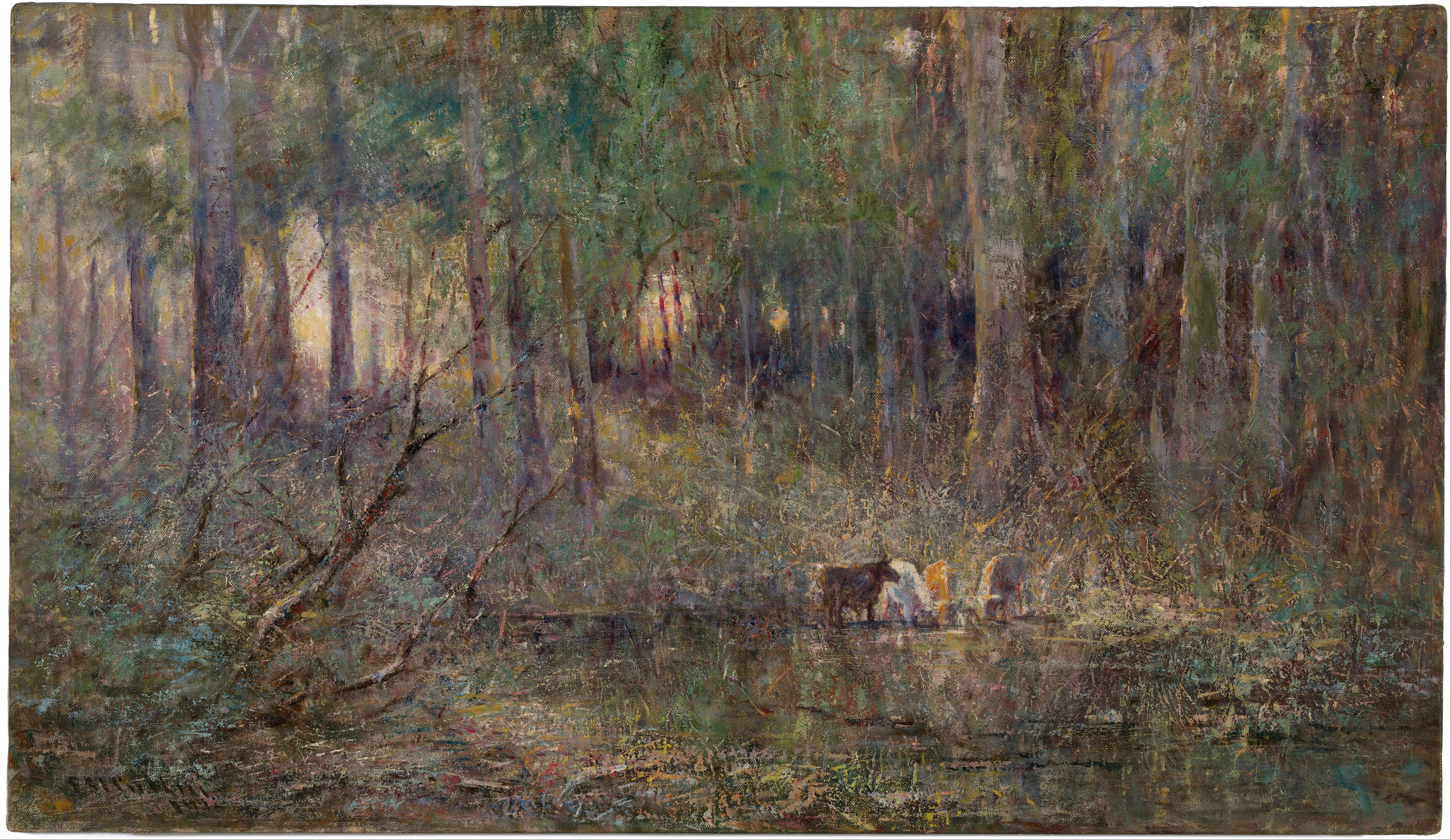
Frederick McCubbin, Violet and Gold, 1911
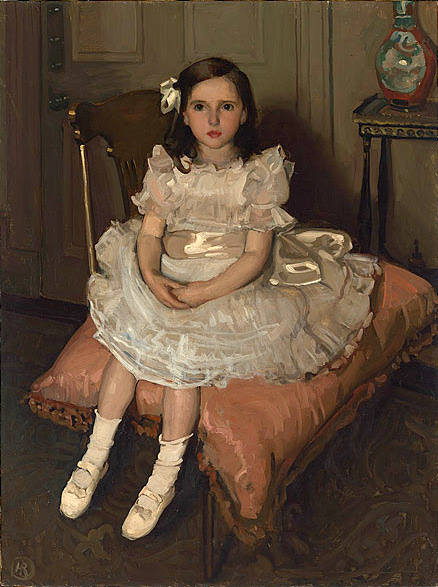
Hugh Ramsay, Portrait of Nellie Patterson, 1903

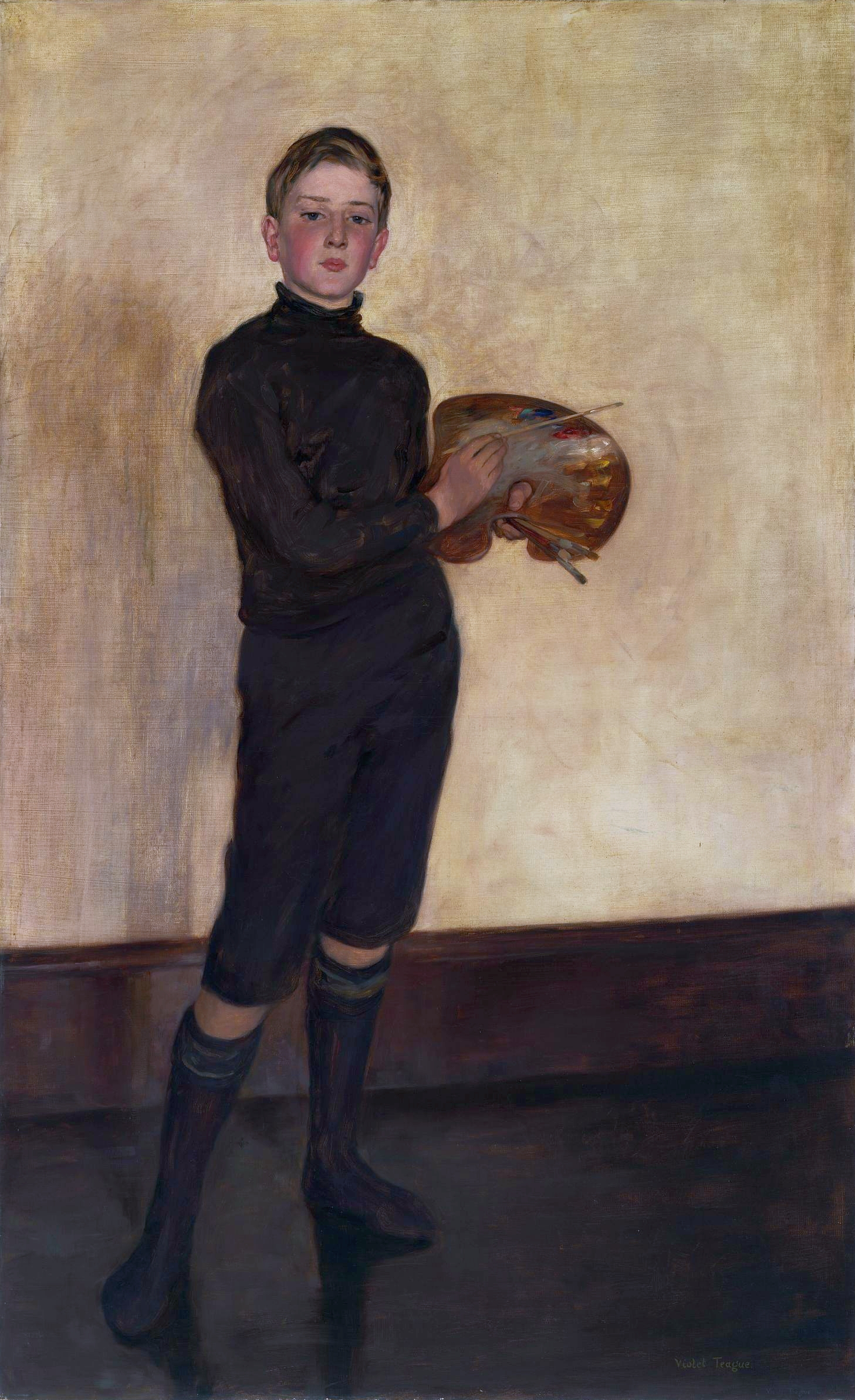
Violet Teague, The boy with the palette, 1911

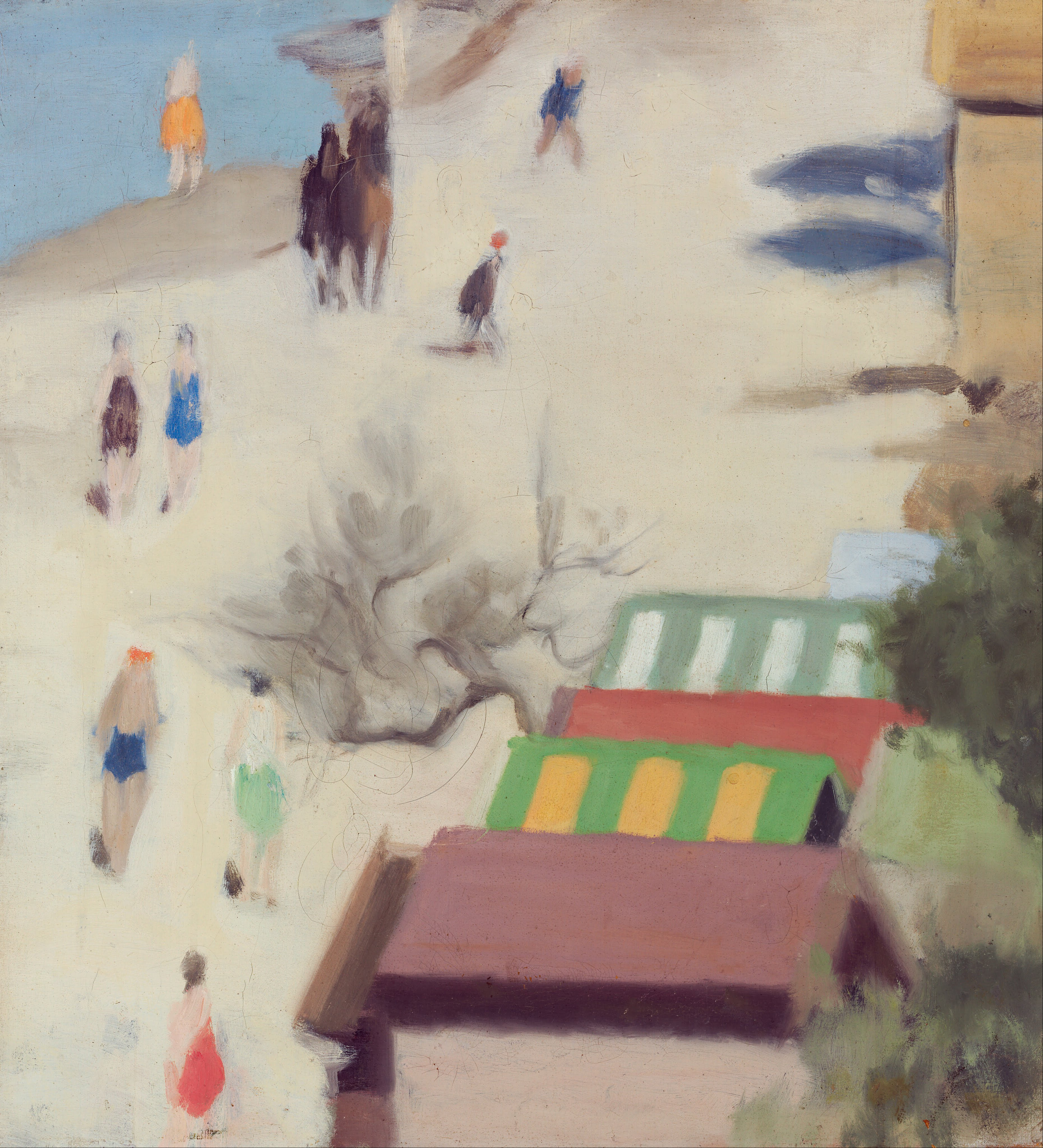
Clarice Beckett, Sandringham Beach, 1933

=== Western art ===
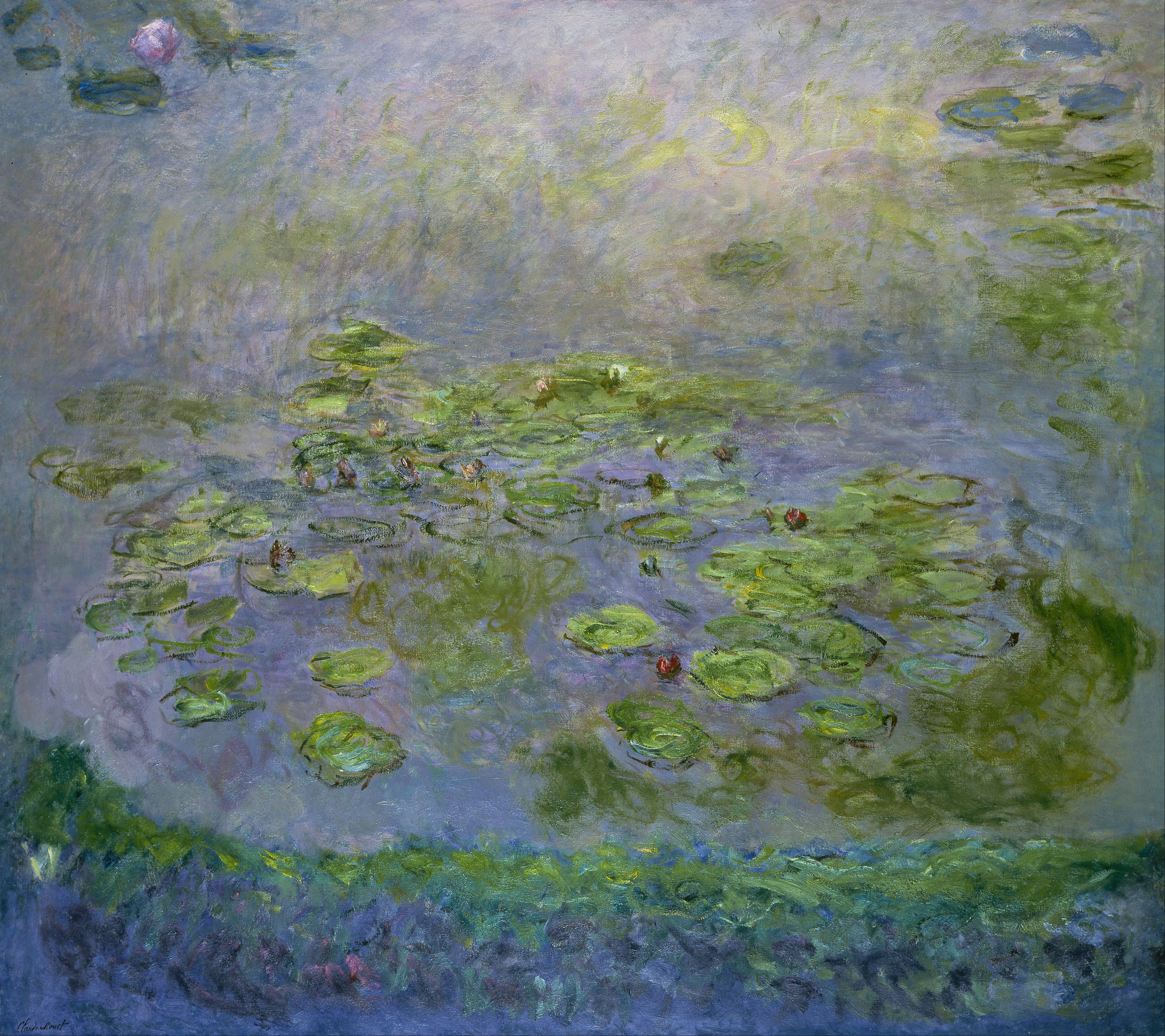
Claude Monet, Nymphéas (Waterlilies), 1914

The focus of the Gallery's international collection is primarily on late 19th-century and 20th-century art although not all artworks are on display. There is a strong collection of modern works. It includes works by:

- Paul Cézanne – L'Après-midi à Naples (Afternoon in Naples)
- Claude Monet – Haystacks, Midday and Water Lilies
- Fernand Léger – Trapeze Artists
- Pablo Picasso – A complete set of the Vollard Suite
- Jackson Pollock – Blue Poles, Totem Lesson 2
- Willem de Kooning – Woman V
- Andy Warhol – Elvis, Electric Chair
- Mark Rothko – Multiform, Black, Brown on Maroon or Deep Red and Black
- Roy Lichtenstein – Kitchen Stove
- David Hockney – A Bigger Grand Canyon
- Lucian Freud – After Cézanne
- Henri Matisse – Oceania, the Sea, Oceania, the Sky
- Constantin Brâncuși – Bird in Space
- Albert Gleizes – Woman with Black Glove (Femme au gant noir)
- Paul Gauguin – The blue roof or Farm at Le Pouldu
- Edvard Munch – Man with horse
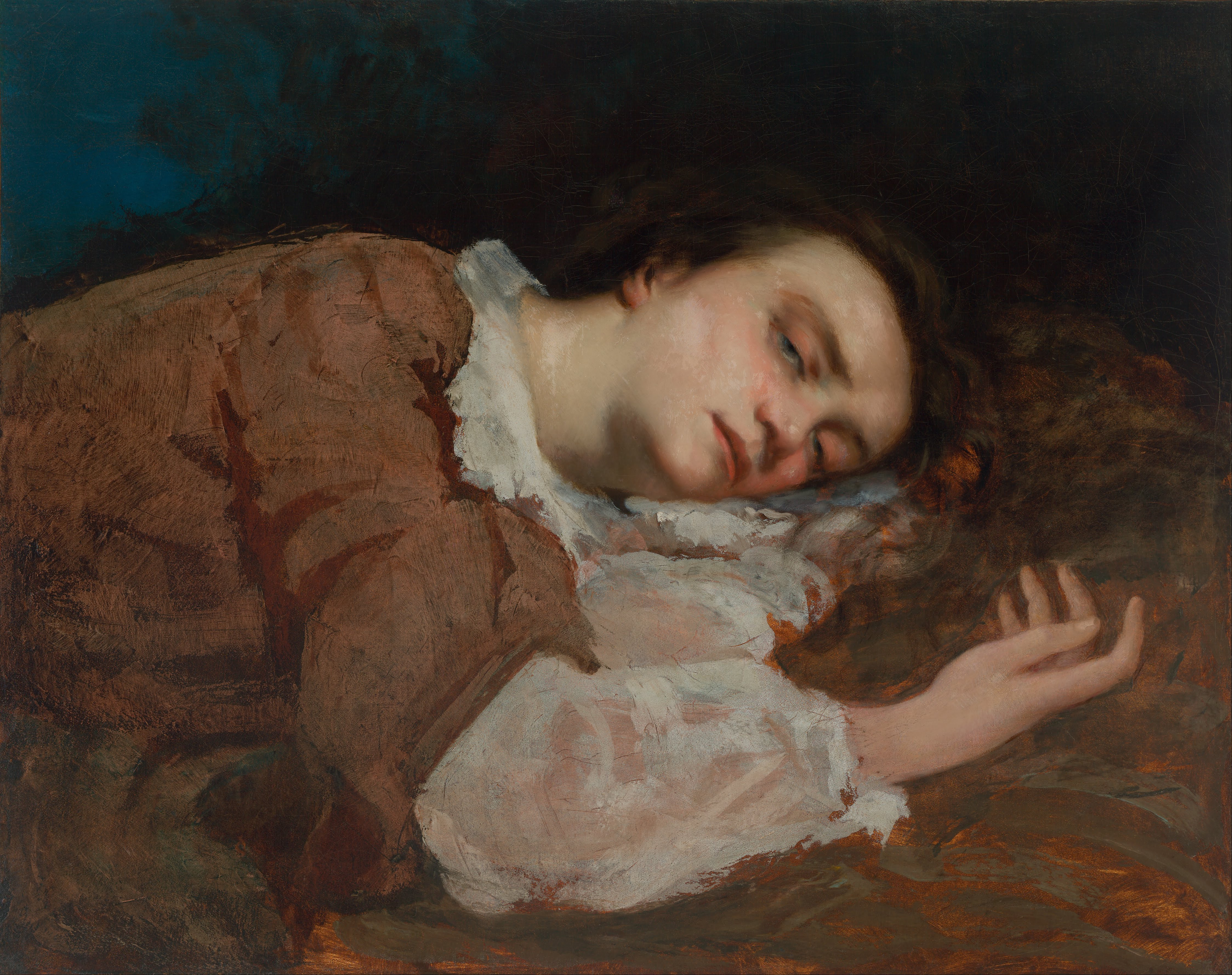
Gustave Courbet, Study for Les Demoiselles des bords de la Seine, 1856

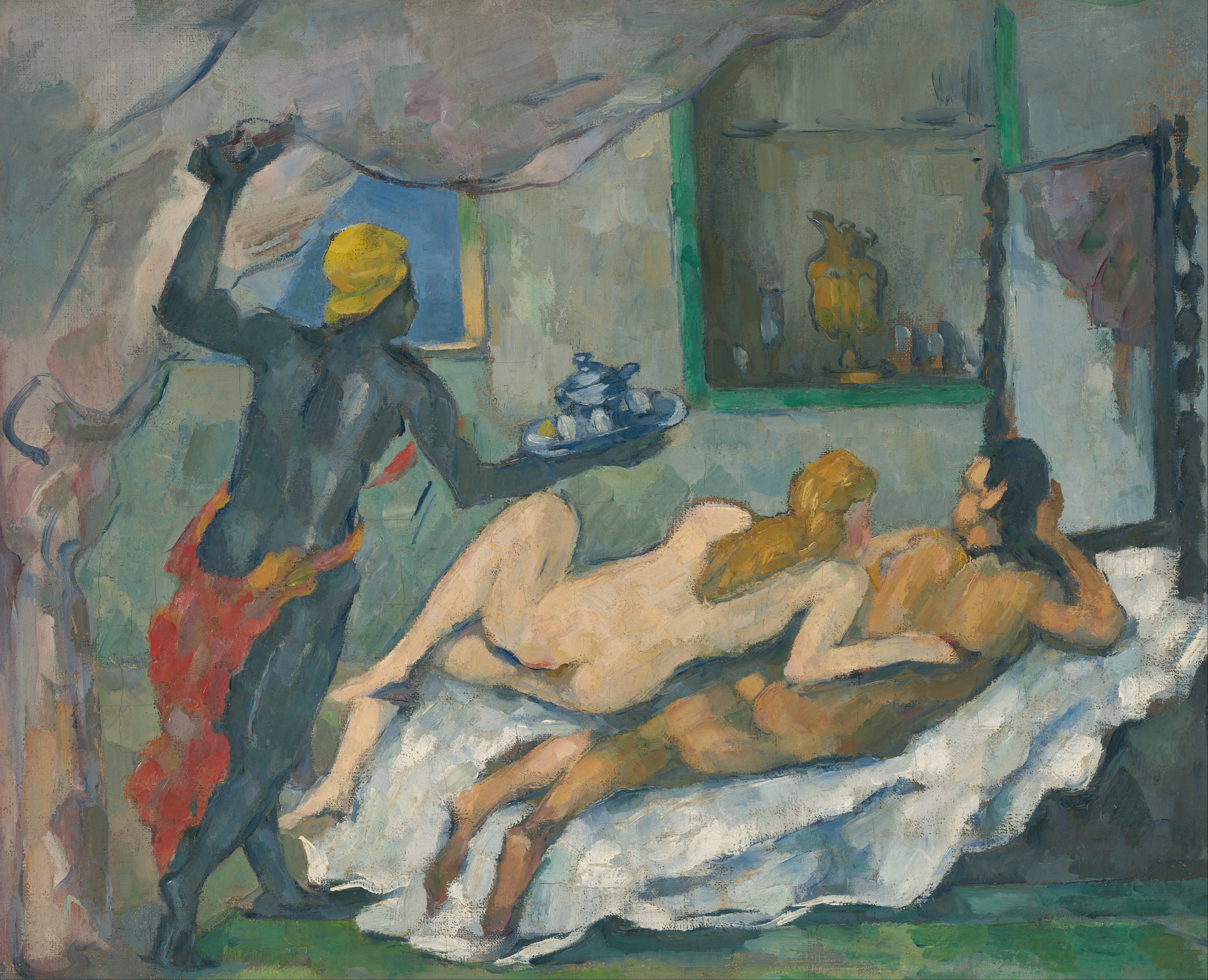
Paul Cézanne, L'Après-midi à Naples (Afternoon in Naples), 1875

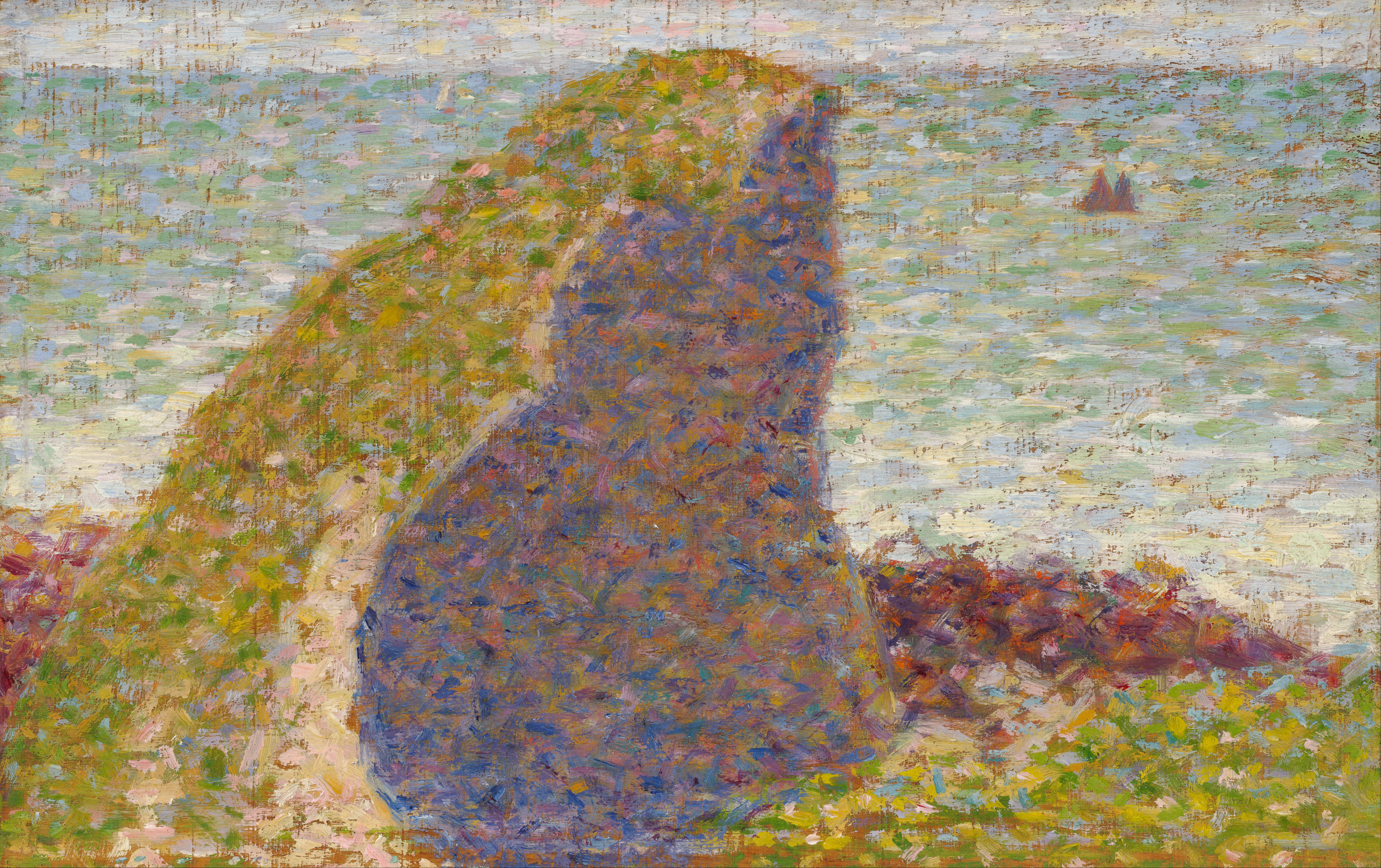
Georges Seurat, Study for Le Bec du Hoc, Grandcamp, 1885

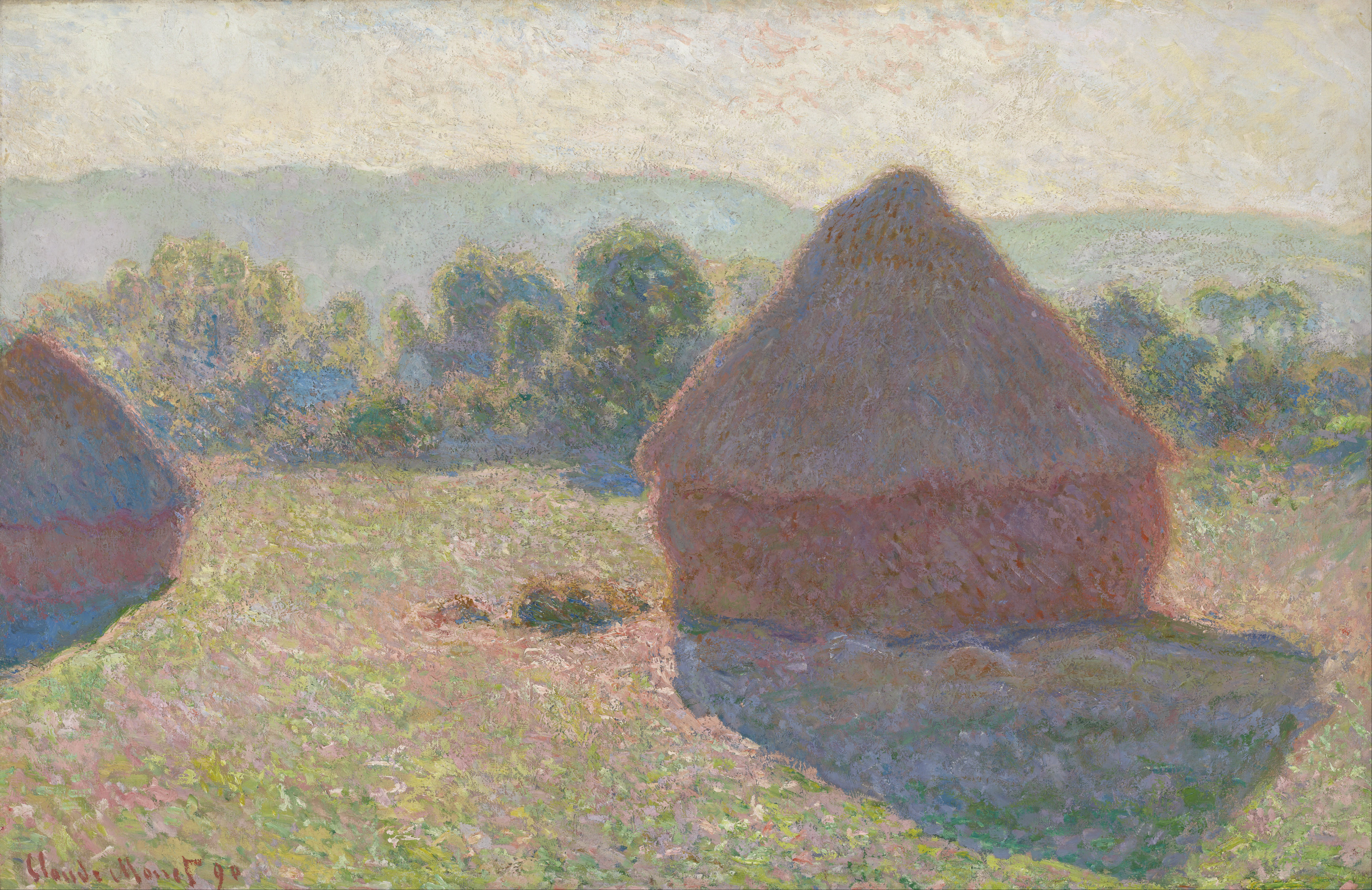
Claude Monet, Meules, milieu du jour (Haystacks, midday), 1890
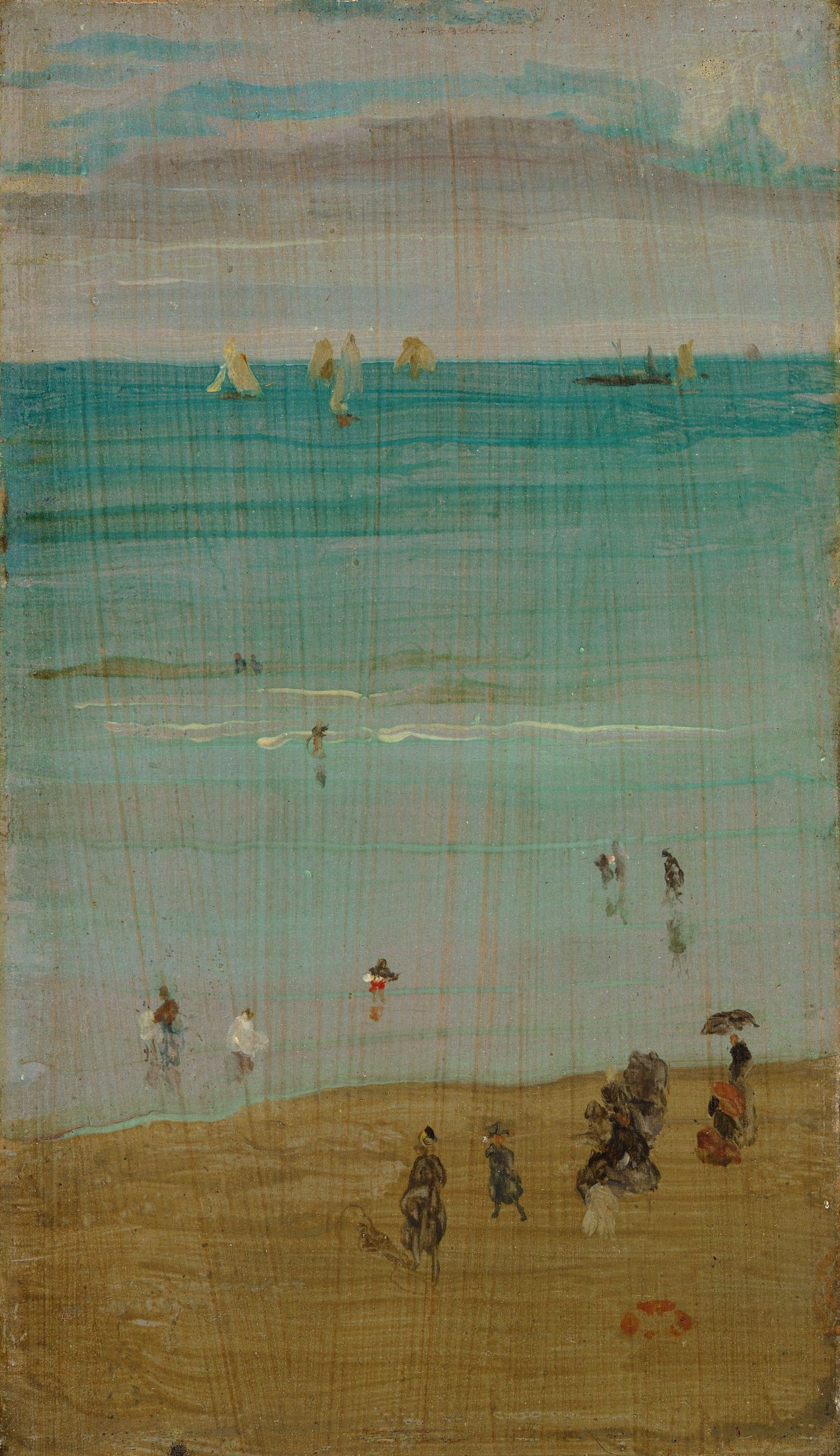
James McNeill Whistler, Harmony in Blue and Pearl (The Sands, Dieppe), 1885

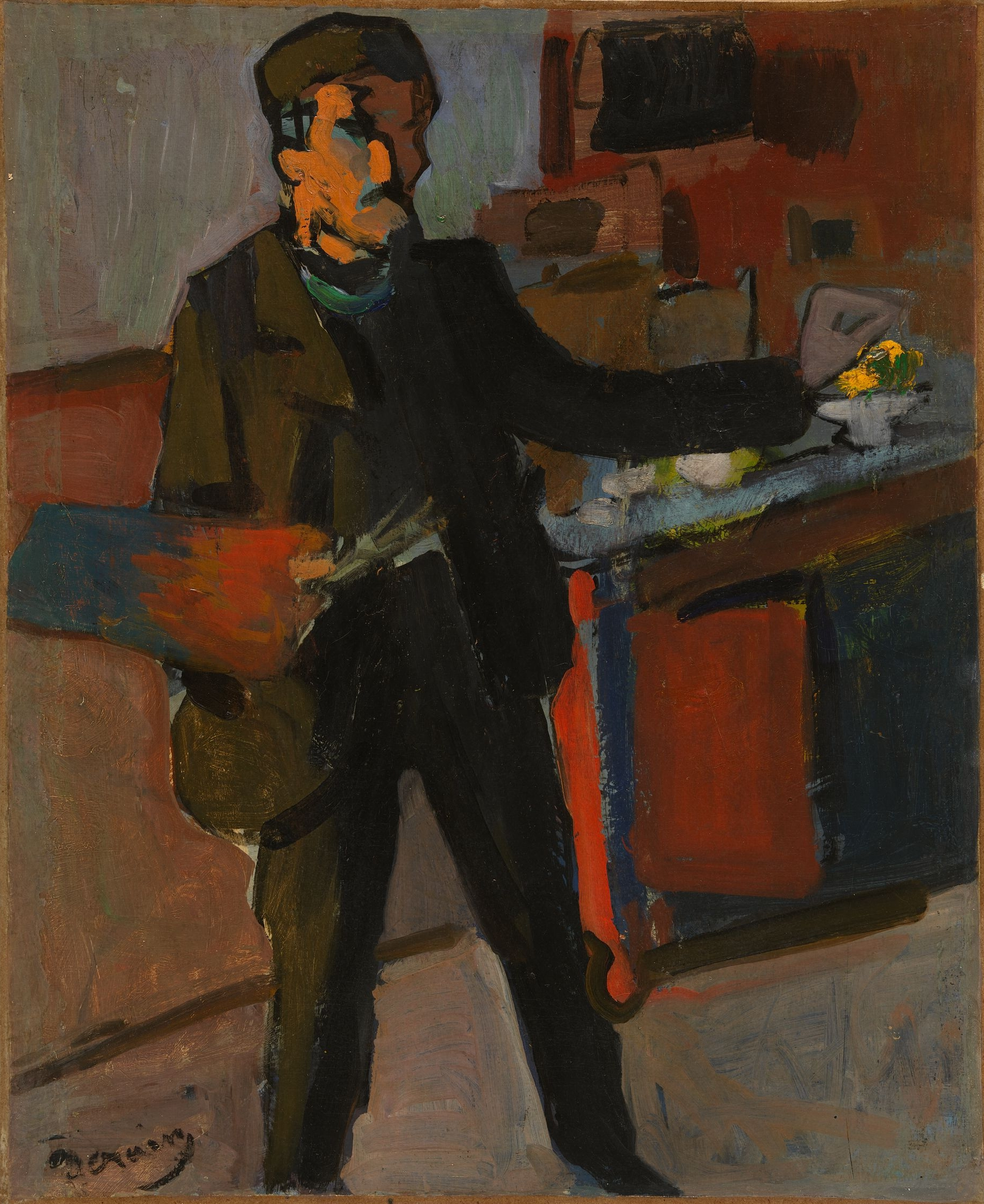
André Derain, Self-portrait in studio, 1903

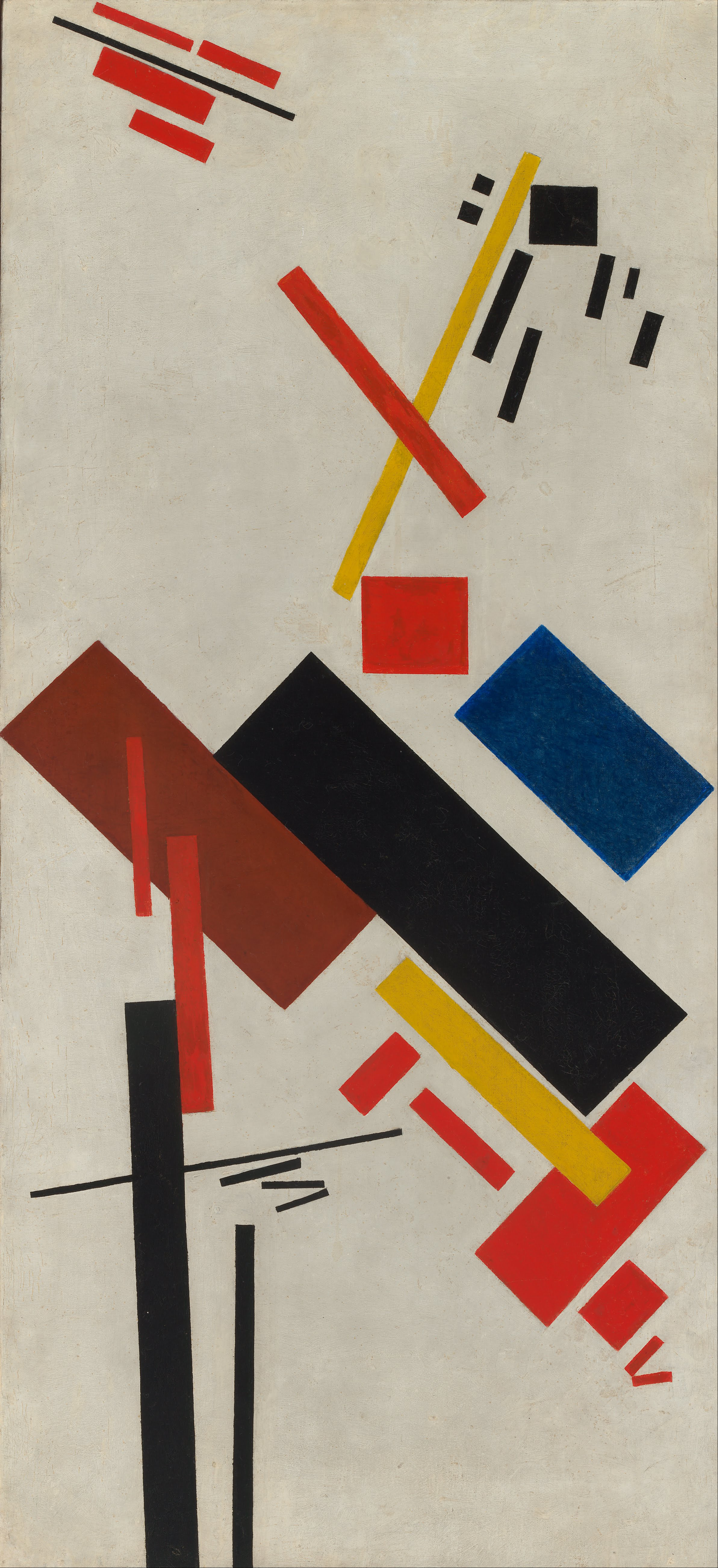
Kasimir Malevich, Stroyuschiysya dom (House under construction), 1915

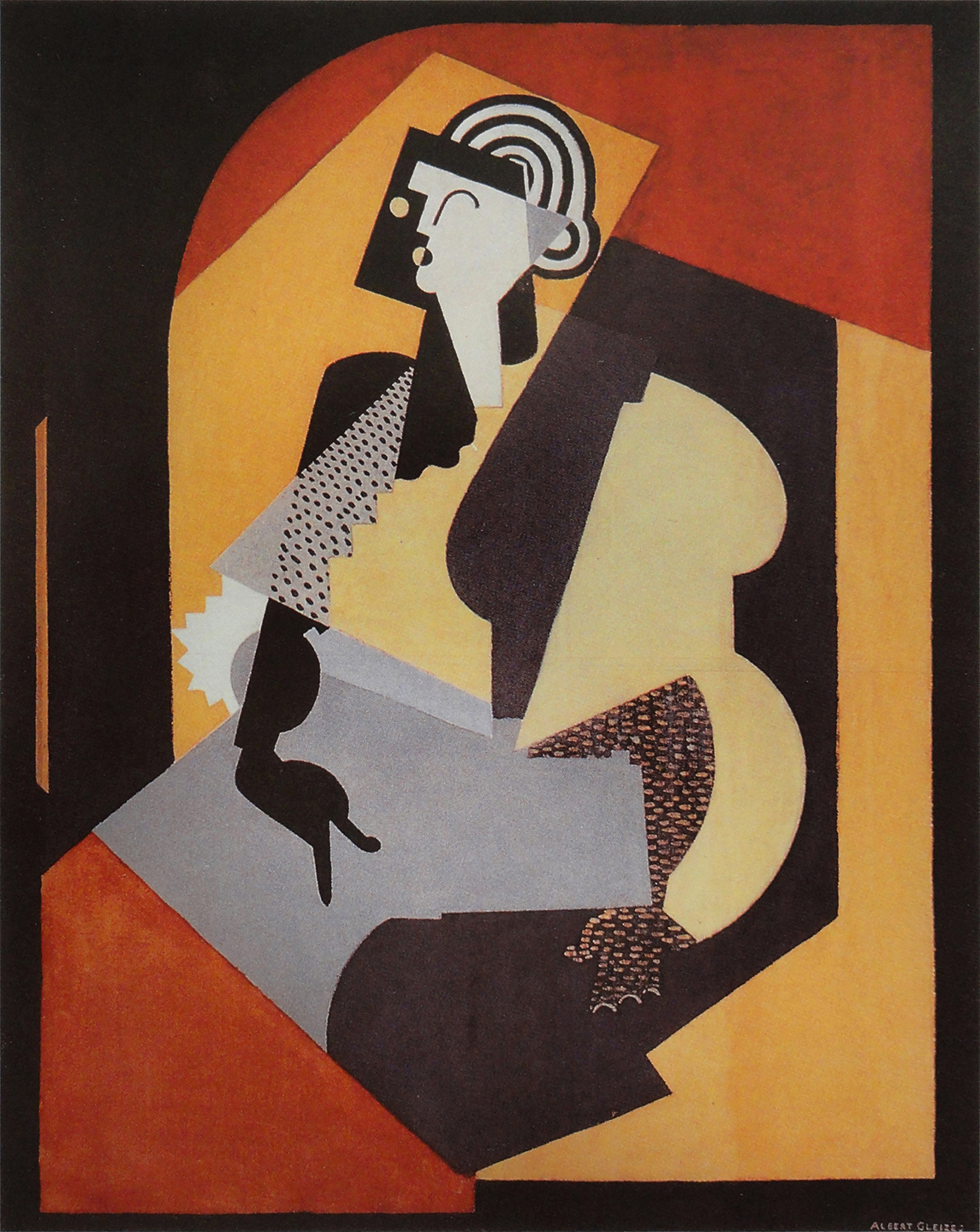
Albert Gleizes, Femme au gant noir (Woman with Black Glove), 1920

The Gallery has a small collection of European Old Master paintings.

=== Eastern art ===
This includes:

- Tang Standing Horse figure, a Tang dynasty tomb figure.

=== Sculpture garden ===
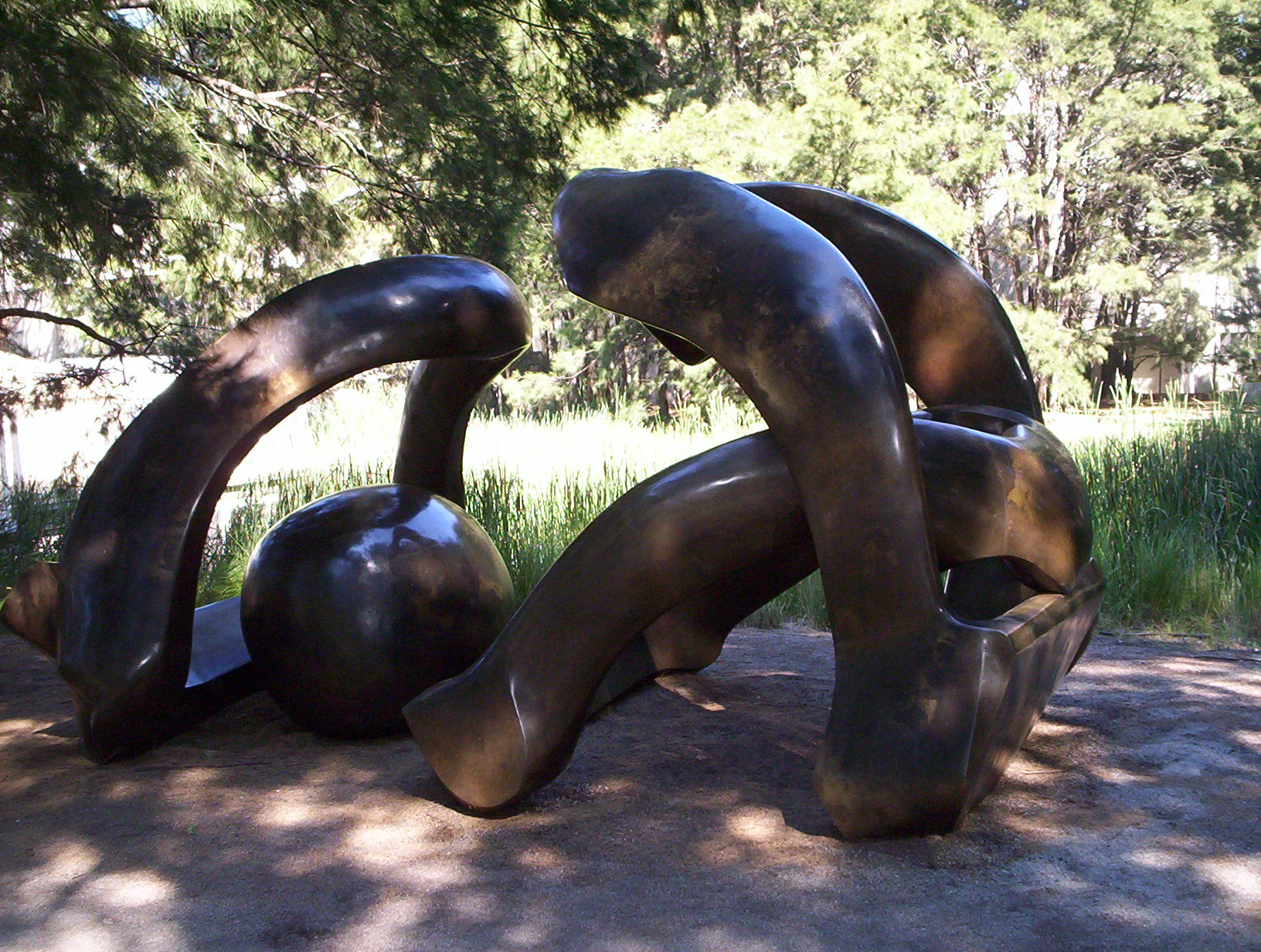
Henry Moore's Hill Arches in the Sculpture Garden

The sculpture garden includes works by:

- Bert Flugelman – Cones
- Antony Gormley – Angel of the North (life-size maquette)
- Fujiko Nakaya – Fog sculpture, this only operates between noon and 2pm. It has been seen as a work of Gas sculpture.
- Henry Moore – Hill Arches
- Mark di Suvero – Ik Ook
- Auguste Rodin – The Burghers of Calais (1 of 12 sets)
- Aristide Maillol – La Montagne (The Mountain)
- Clement Meadmore – Virginia
- Barnett Newman – Broken Obelisk

== See also ==
- Art of Australia
- Art Gallery of New South Wales
- Art Gallery of South Australia
- List of national galleries
- List of sculpture parks
- National Gallery of Australia Research Library
- National Gallery of Victoria
- National Portrait Gallery
- Queensland Art Gallery
- Art Gallery of South Australia
- Art Gallery of Western Australia
- Art Gallery of New South Wales
- Tasmanian Museum and Art Gallery
