= Australian Girls Own Gallery =

- Established: 1989
- Dissolved: 1998
- Location: 71 Leichhardt Street, Kingston ACT
- Coordinates: 35°19′15″S 149°08′48″E
- Type: Art museum
- Founder: Helen Maxwell

The australian Girls Own Gallery (aGOG) was a commercial art gallery that operated in Leichhardt Street, Kingston in Canberra from 1989 to 1998. The gallery was owned and operated by former National Gallery of Australia curator Helen Maxwell, and exhibited the work of women artists almost exclusively.

== History ==
The gallery opened in 1989. The first exhibition at aGOG was Les femmes formidables 1 which ran from 16 March – 19 April 1989 and featured the work of five female artists: Banduk Marika, Barbara Hanrahan, Joyce Allen, Lidia Groblicka and Kate Lohse. Art historian and art critic Sasha Grishin noted that the represented artists "from an important cross-section of contemporary women printmakers in Australia".

aGOG would exhibit several group and solo shows each year. Represented artists included: Vivienne Binns, Pam Debenham, Judy Horacek, Marie McMahon, Patsy Payne, Mitzi Shearer, Ruth Waller, and Judy Watson.

In 1992 and 1995, solo exhibitions of the work of Yolngu artist Nancy Gaymala Yunupingu were shown. aGog closed in 1998.

== Significance ==
The gallery was significant because it only represented women artists (although towards the end of its operations the work of men would be very rarely exhibited). Maxwell started the gallery because she felt as that there was a bias against women artists within the art world and she "felt strongly that women didn't get enough of a voice".

== Helen Maxwell Gallery ==
Maxwell went on to open the Helen Maxwell Gallery in Braddon, Canberra, in March 2000. This gallery represented both male and female artists until its closure in January 2010. Tony Coleing, Judy Horacek, Barbie Kjar, Banduk Marika, Patsy Payne and Robin White, and Vera Zulumovski were just some of the artists exhibited in at least 178 exhibitions held there.

Exhibitions mounted by this gallery included:

- 2001: Vital Fluids, a multi-artist exhibition including the work of England Bangala, Banduk Marika, Judy Watson, Naminapu Maymuru-White, Robin White, Nancy Gaymala Yunupingu, and Barrupu Yunupingu
- 2003: Groundswell: An exhibition of Aboriginal art, a multi-artist exhibition at the Helen Maxwell Gallery
