= Reconciliation Place =

Coordinates: 35.29853°0′S 149.133°0′E

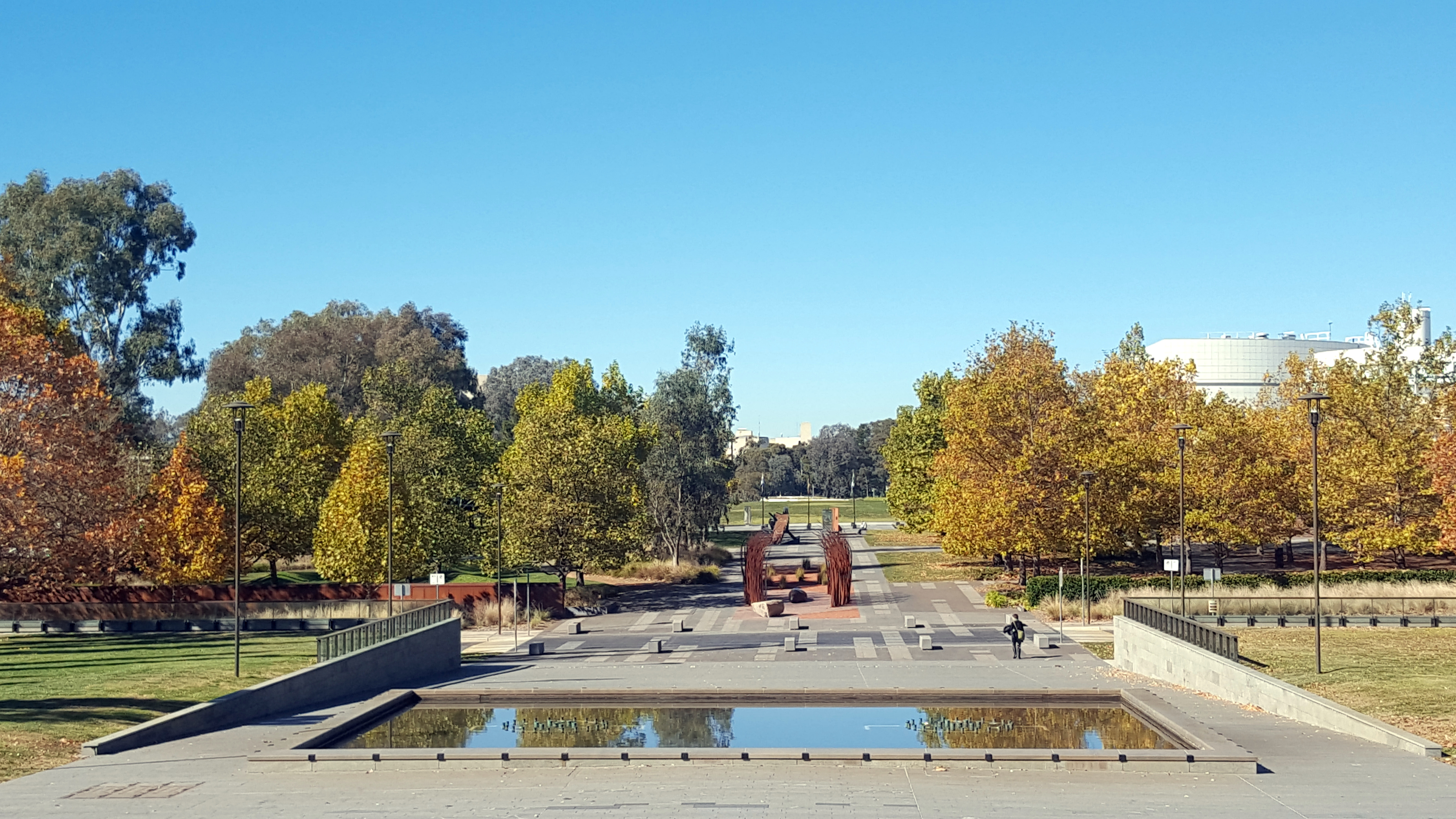
Overlook to Reconciliation Place from the National Library of Australia steps

Reconciliation Place is an urban landscape design in the Parliamentary Triangle Canberra, Australia dedicated to reconciliation between Australia's Indigenous peoples and the mainly European settler population. Reconciliation Place was opened by Prime Minister John Howard in 2002.

== Design ==
The design of Reconciliation Place emanated from the Australian Government's open national design competition in 2001. The winning entry was designed by Australian architect Simon Kringas. Sharon Payne was an Indigenous Cultural Representative. The competition jury included Ngunnawal Elder Matilda House and RAIA Gold Medal architect Richard Leplastrier. The design was chosen for its "direct and timeless qualities". It is described as "one of the world’s most significant public memorials to indigenous history".

The design is dominated by a convex mound – termed the 'midden' – centred on the land and water axes conceived by Walter Burley Griffin and Marion Mahony Griffin's design for Canberra. The subtle rise in elevation provides expansive views. It is an "outward looking ... contemplative space" – "a nexus from which both axes can be simultaneously – and almost ethereally – experienced". Linking the High Court of Australia and National Gallery to the National Library of Australia is a public promenade adorned with acutely sculpted installations called "Slivers", each displaying images and text on themes of reconciliation and intended to accrue and evolve over time. Each Sliver is a fragment of the macro composition, with a consistent angular morphology, materials and a constant datum, combining to form a broad fractured landscape.

Internationally, the design of “Reconciliation Place presents a unique solution … demonstrating a long-term planning strategy for commemoration that admits the complexity, contradiction and continuity of memory. lts masterplan consists of a large number of fragmentary art work "slivers" by various designers … The artworks range from patches of landscape to primeval carved megaliths to sleek, angular assemblages of photo etched steel and glass. Visitors can take various paths among the art works, which allows for different readings. The masterplan intends that new works will continue to be added as the process of reconciliation unfolds. Indeed, the precinct's fragmentary form helps communicate the idea of an incomplete and unresolved narrative … lts form and its meanings provide an alternative to the physical, conceptual and thematic traditions and rigidities of stale commemoration”.

“Both the layout and themes of this precinct contest the State's hegemony in defining the past”.

== Artwork ==
- A welcome to Ngunnawal country - an acknowledgement of the traditional owners of the land on which Reconciliation Place is being built
- The 1967 referendum that amended the Australian constitution to allow the Commonwealth Government to legislate on Aboriginal and Torres Strait Islander issues
- The recognition of native title rights which found that native title to land was part of Australia's common law
- The contribution Indigenous people have made, and continue to make, to Australia in sport and in the defence of our nation
- Indigenous leadership, depicting two great leaders — Neville Bonner and Vincent Lingiari (leader of the Wave Hill walk-off)
- The past practice of separating Indigenous children from their families

Artworks installed since the opening of Reconciliation Place include:

- Three cast bronze sculptures celebrating the role of female Indigenous leadership, particularly in their contribution to reconciliation in Australia through their roles in the 1967 Referendum. The artwork reflects leadership provided by Dr Faith Bandler, Lady Jessie Street, and Evelyn Scott.
- The sculpture Fire and Water, created by Judy Watson, erected in 2007.
- Three stone artworks celebrating the resilience and achievements of Indigenous Australians who made contributions to Australian life. This includes artwork celebrating Ruby Hammond, Robert Lee, Wenten Rubuntja, Bill Neidjie and Gatjil Djerrkura.

=== Gallery ===
These pictures are sorted by their coordinates, starting from the National Library of Australia to the National Portrait Gallery of Australia.

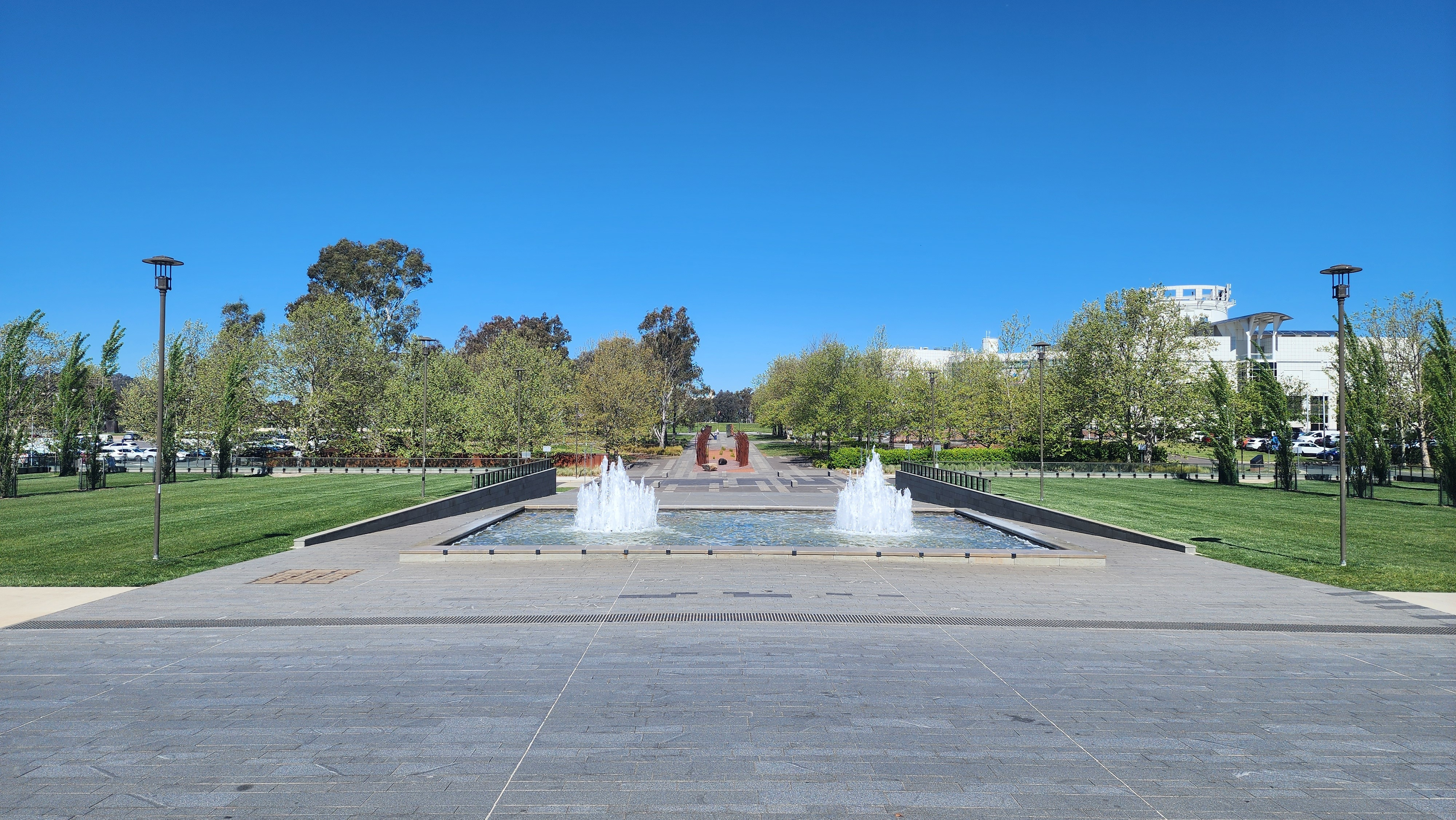
View from the National Library of Australia

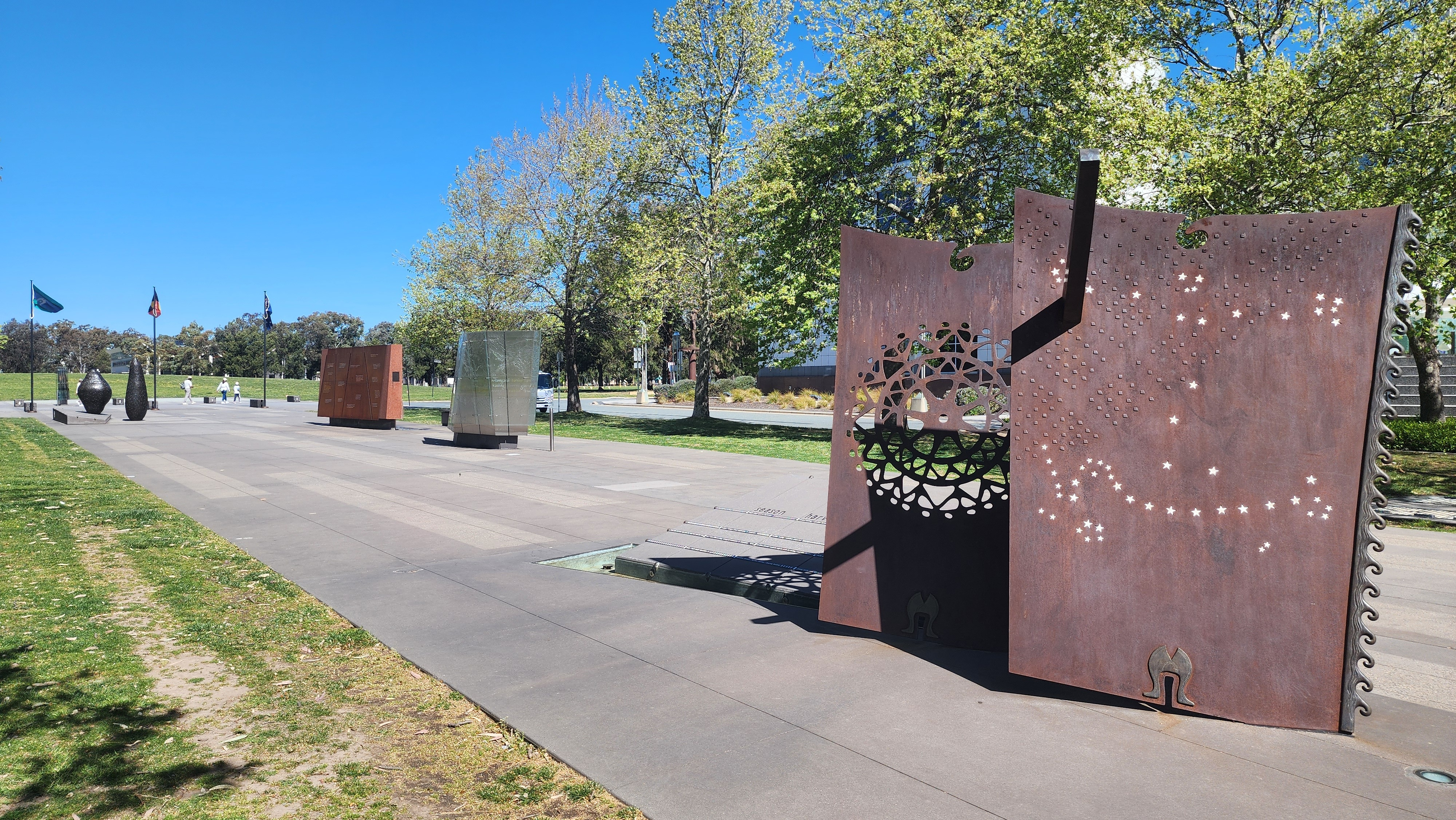
Overview of the west side

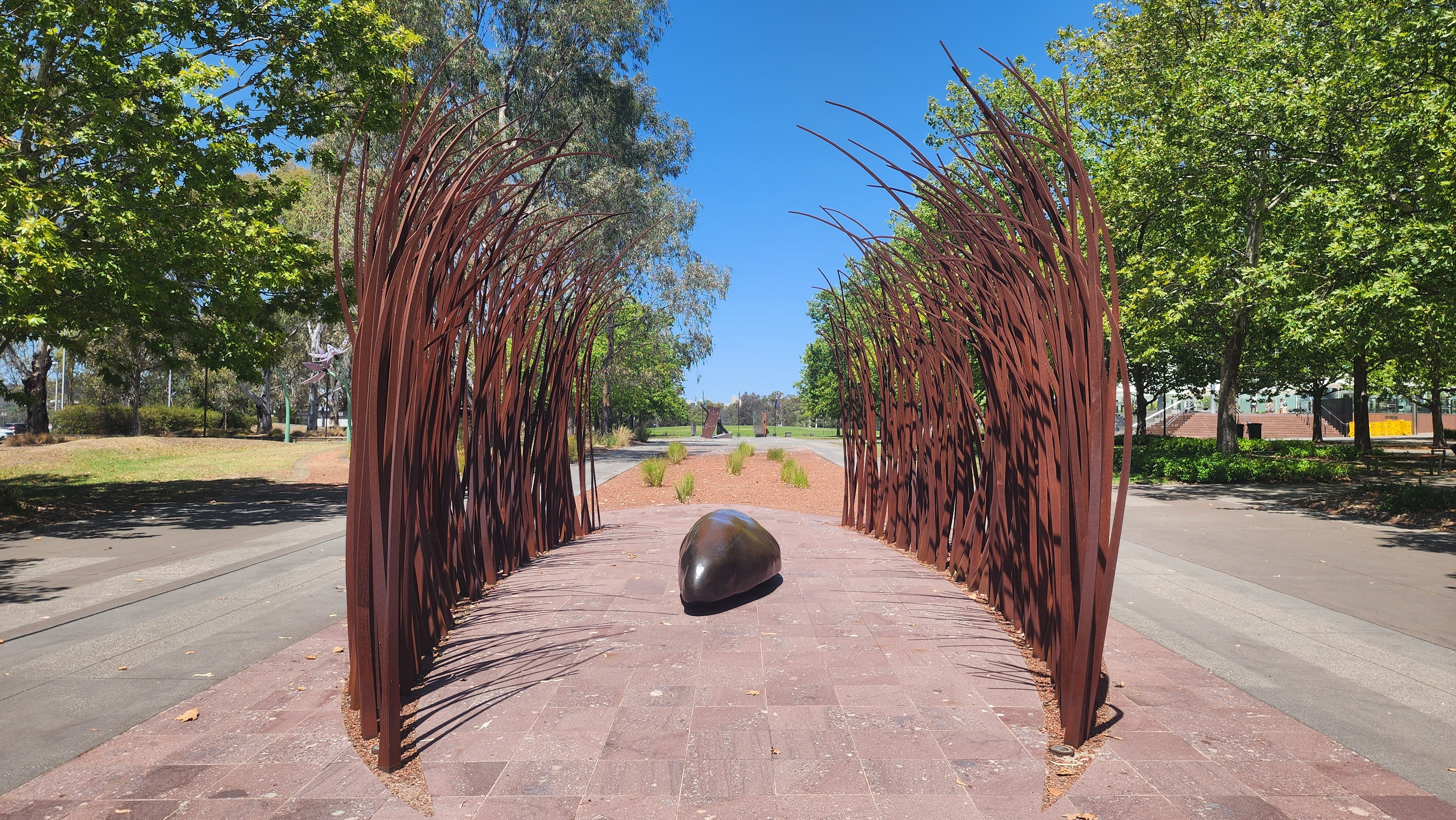
Fire and Water (2007) by Judy Watson

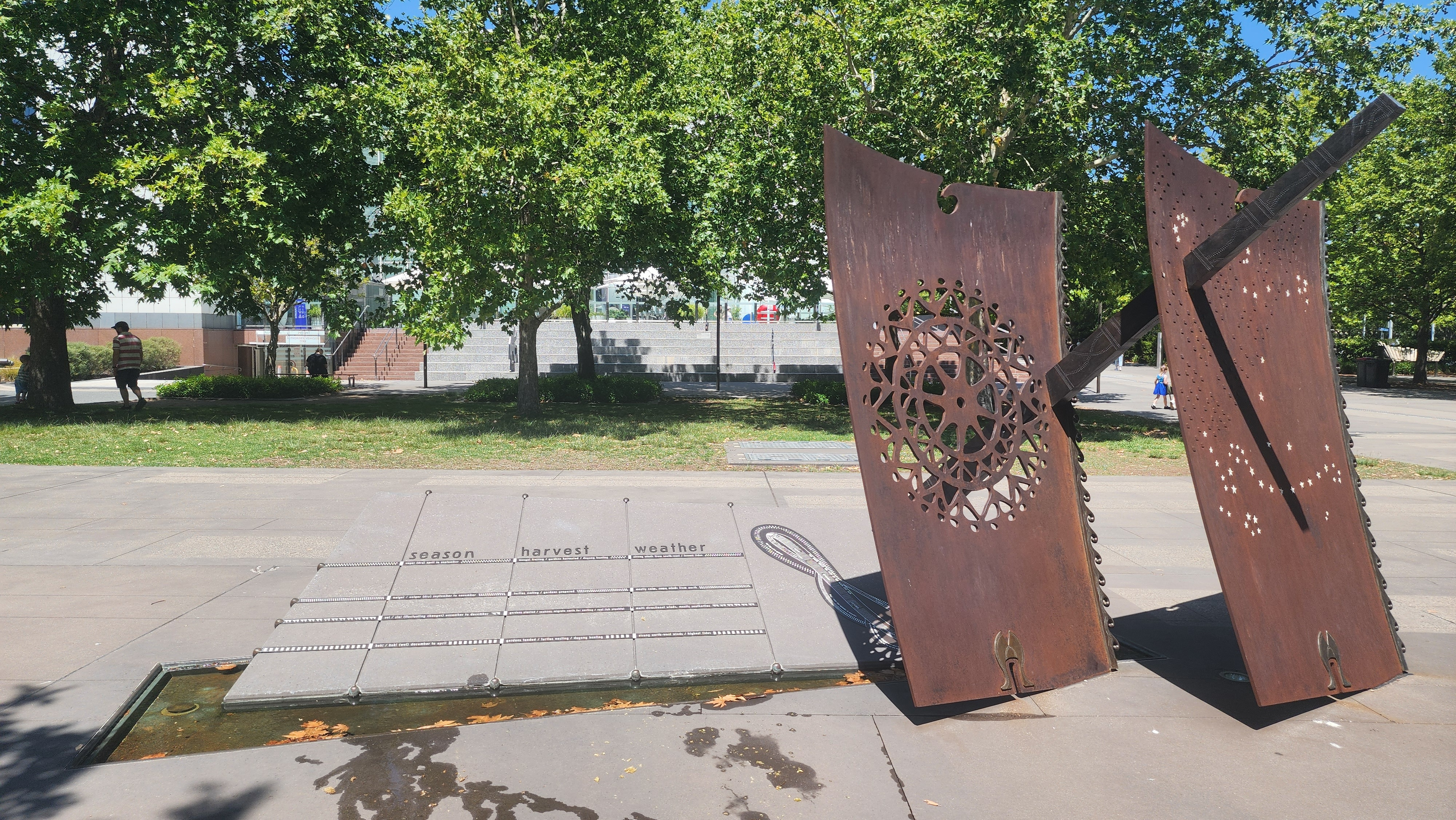
Methalu Tharri (Smooth sailing)

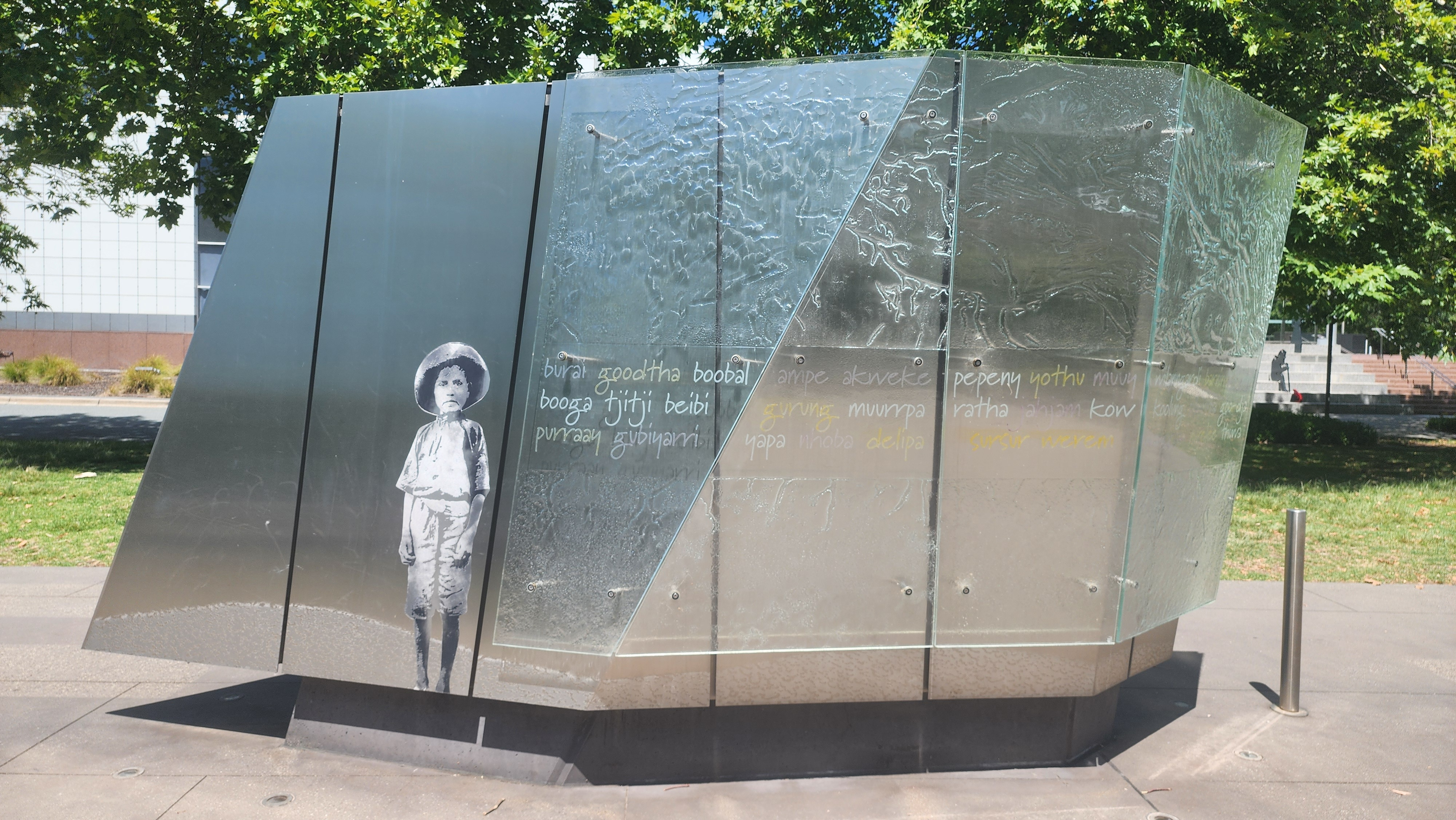
Separation 1 (North face)

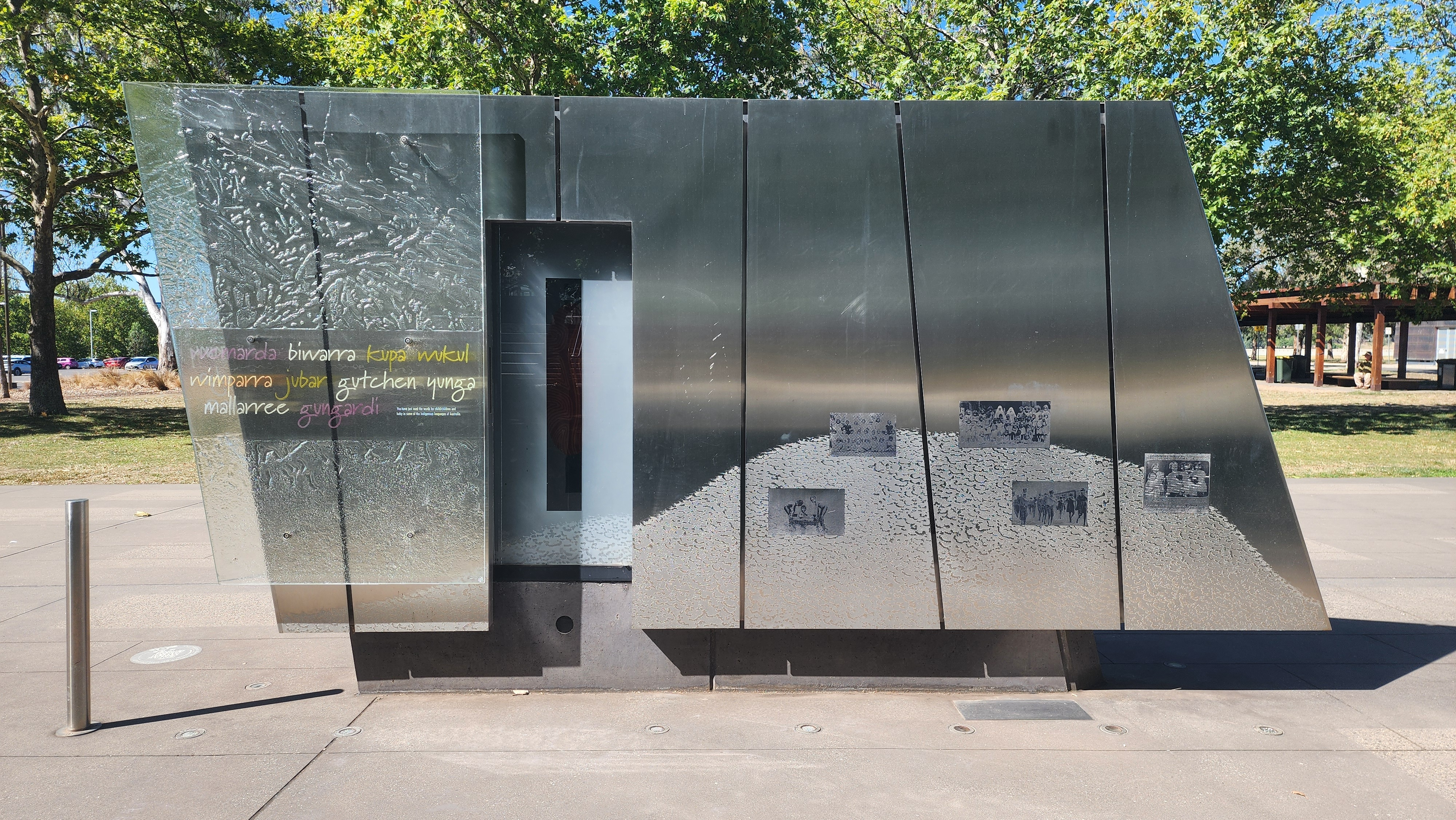
Separation 1 (South face)

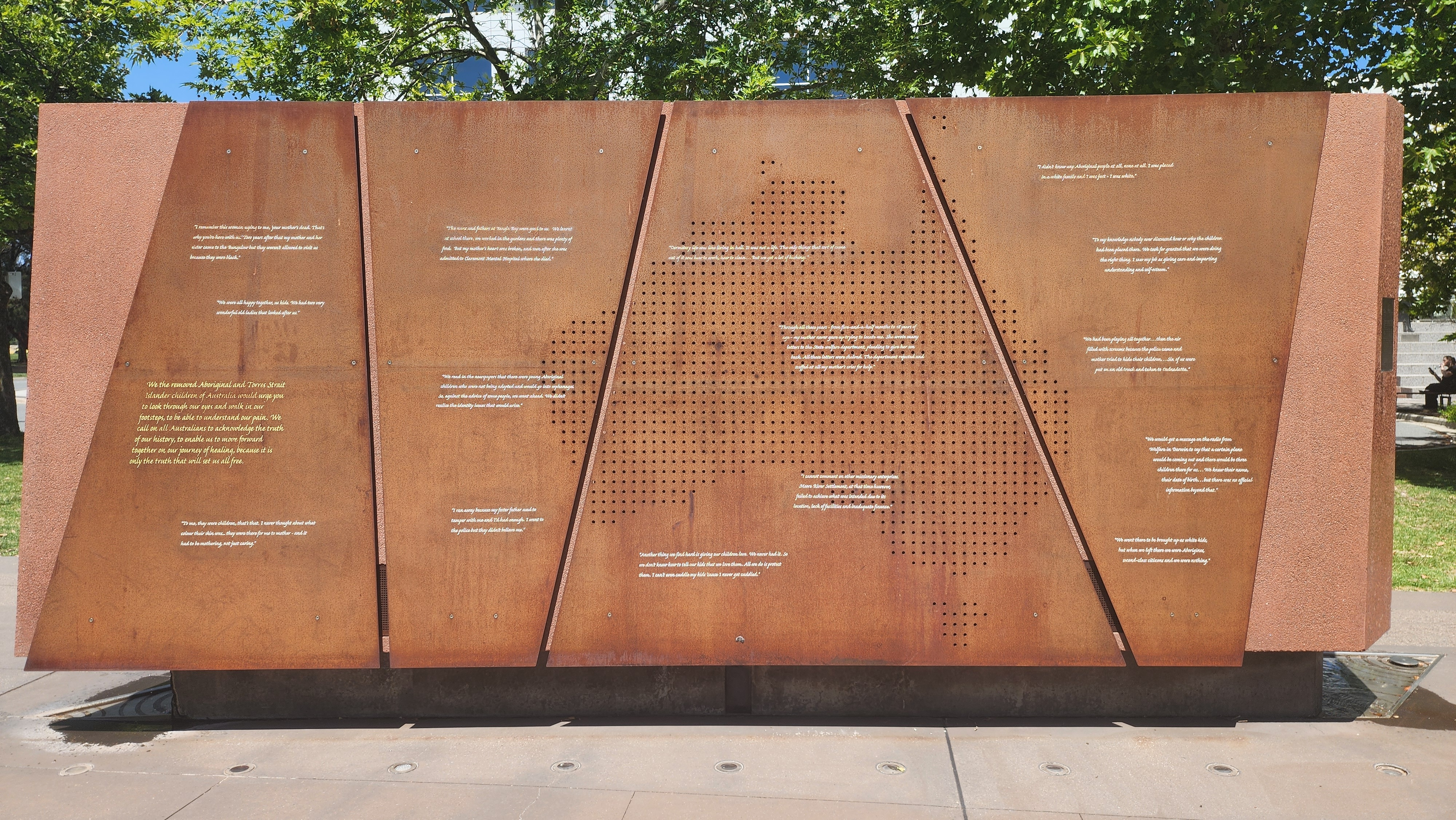
Separation 2 (North face)

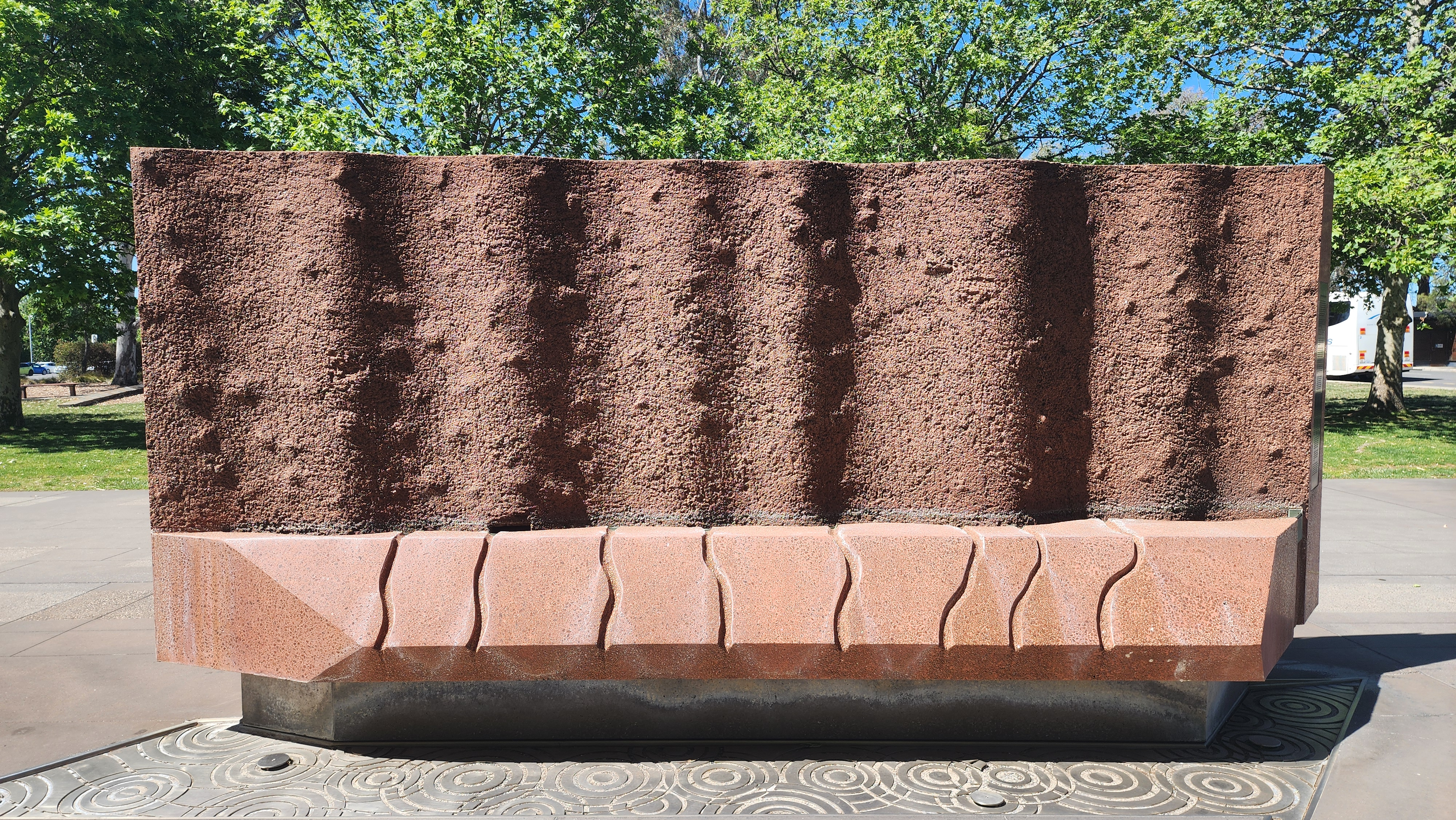
Separation 2 (South face)

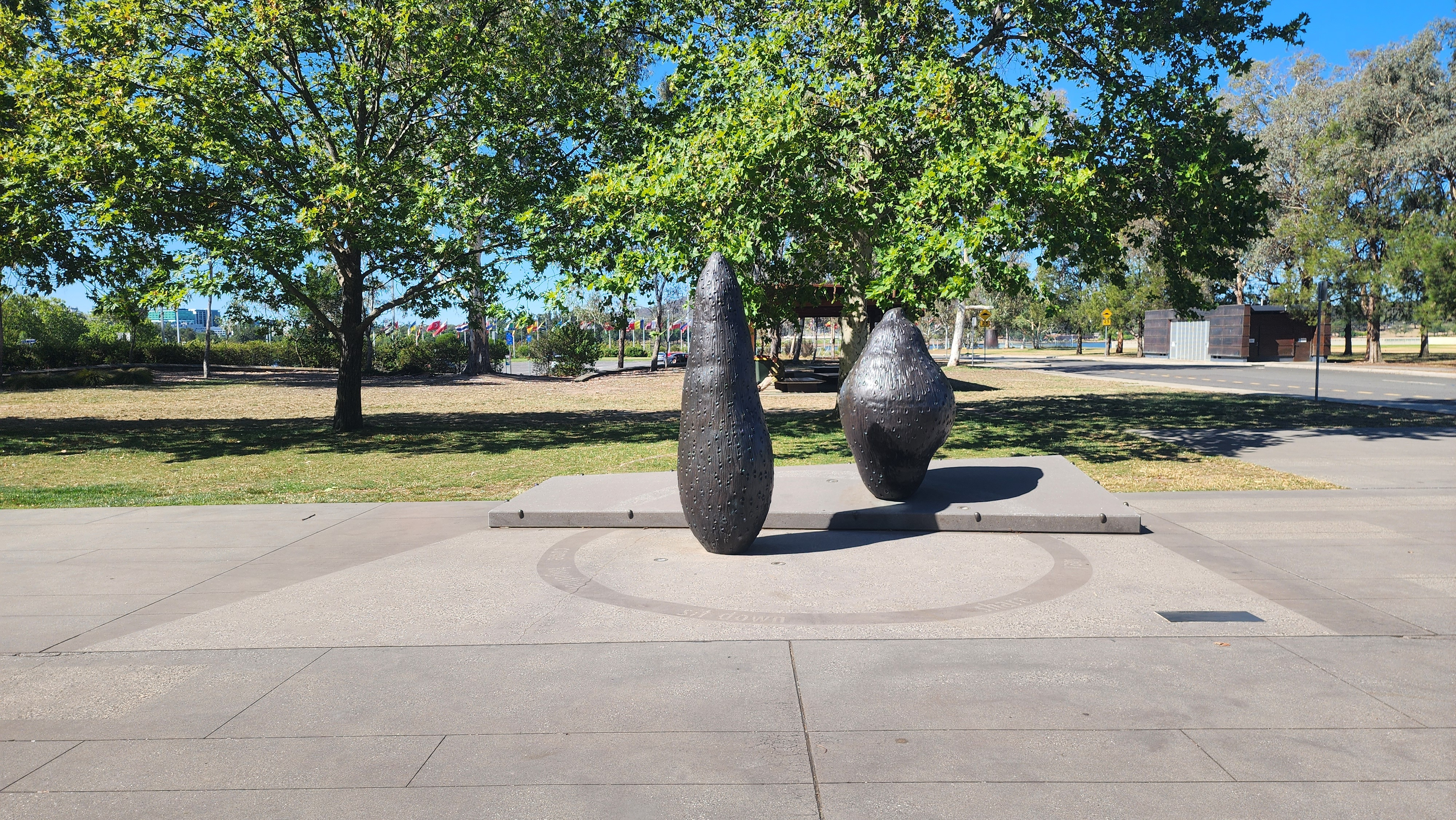
Kwi'ith, Man and Woman Yam

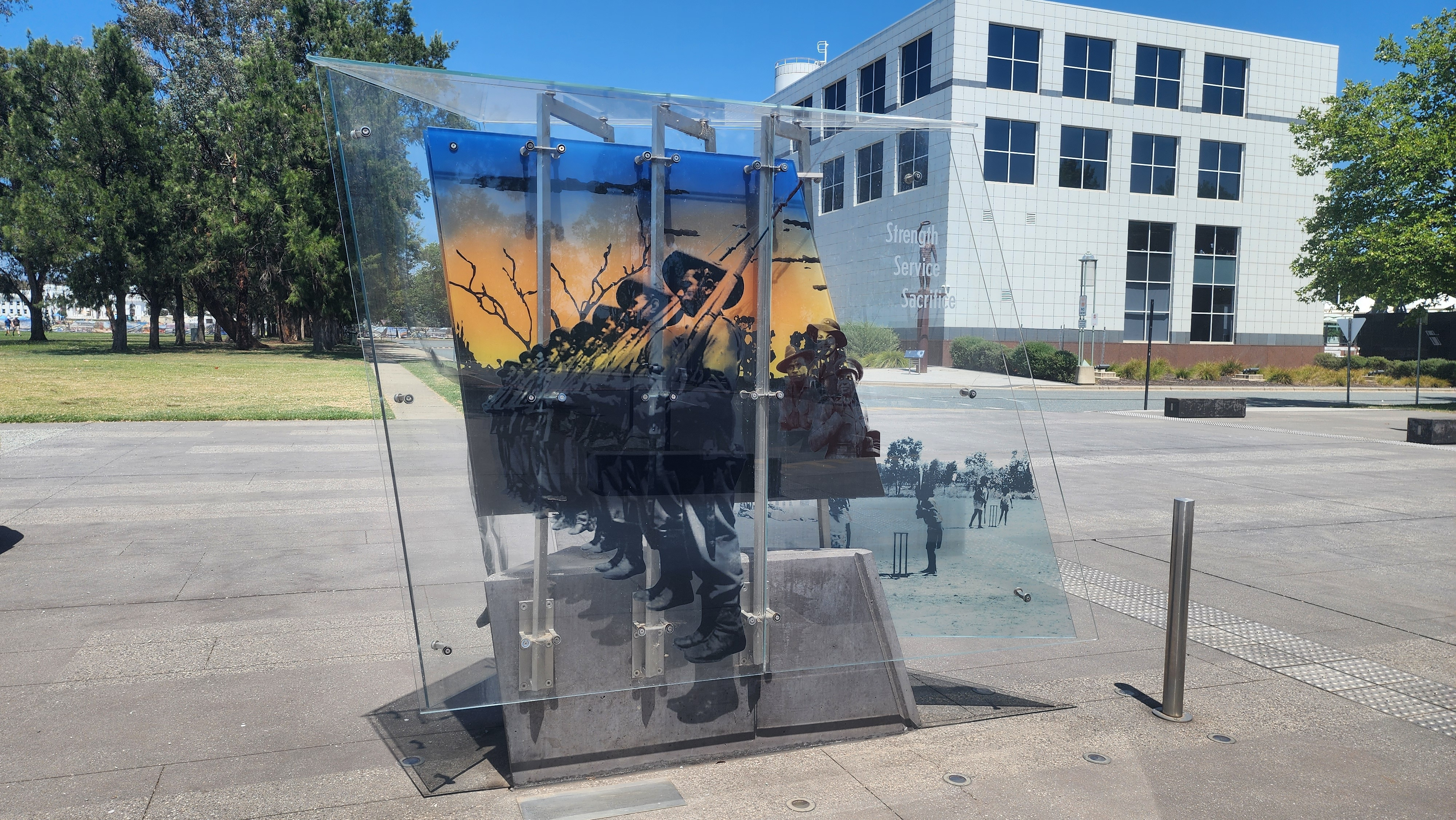
Strength, Service and Sacrifice (North face)

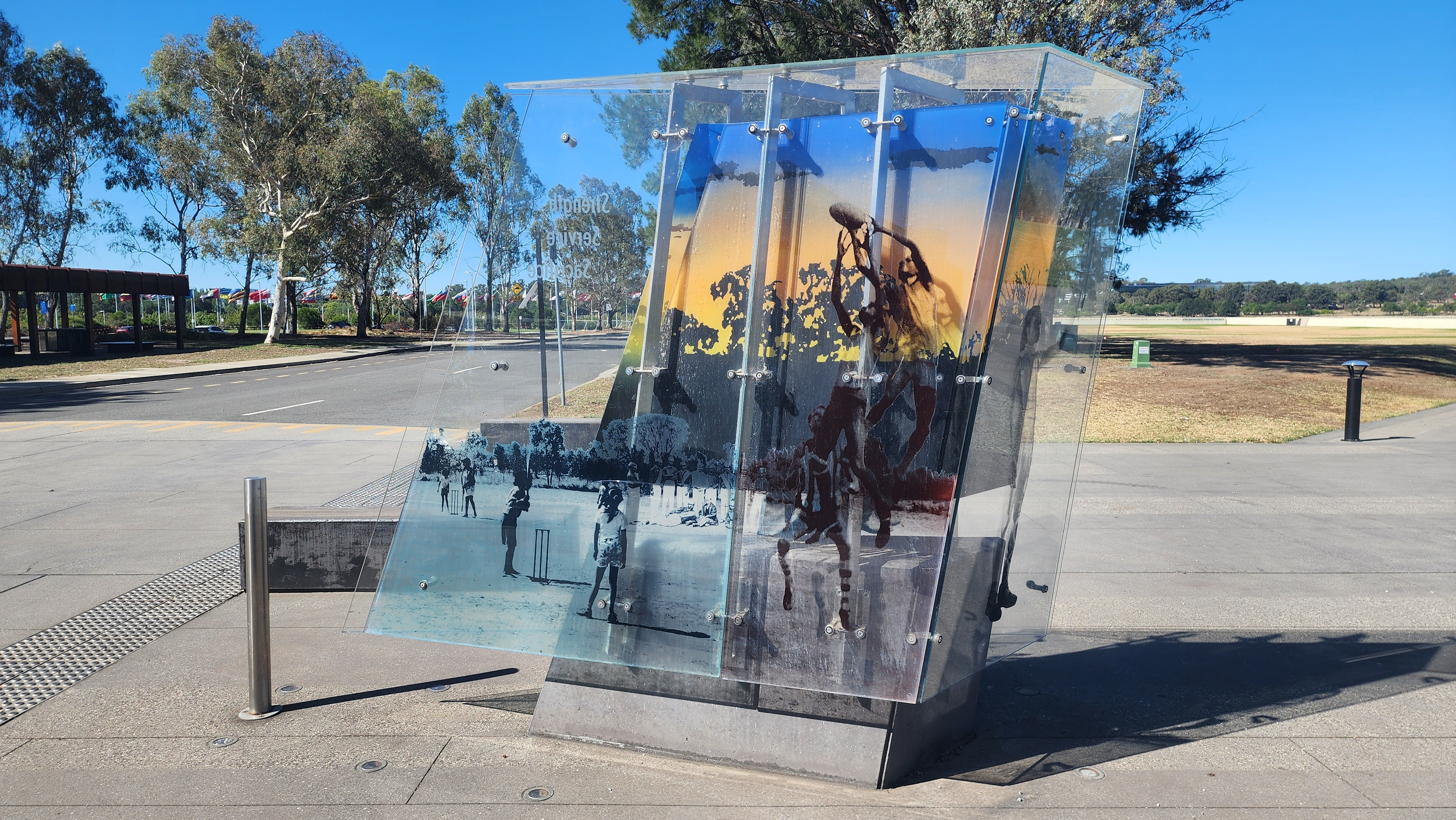
Strength, Service and Sacrifice (South face)

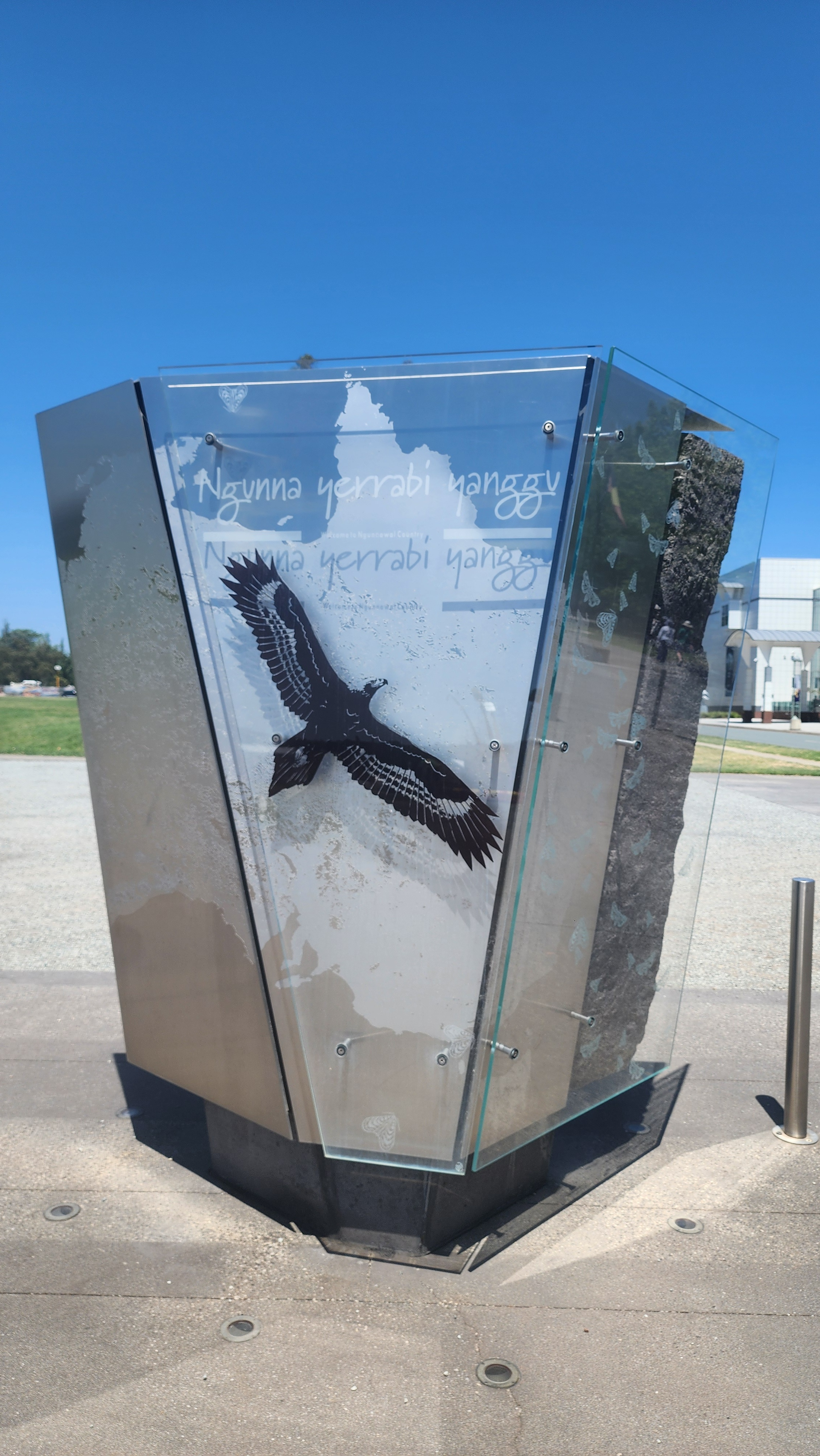
Ngunnawal (North face)

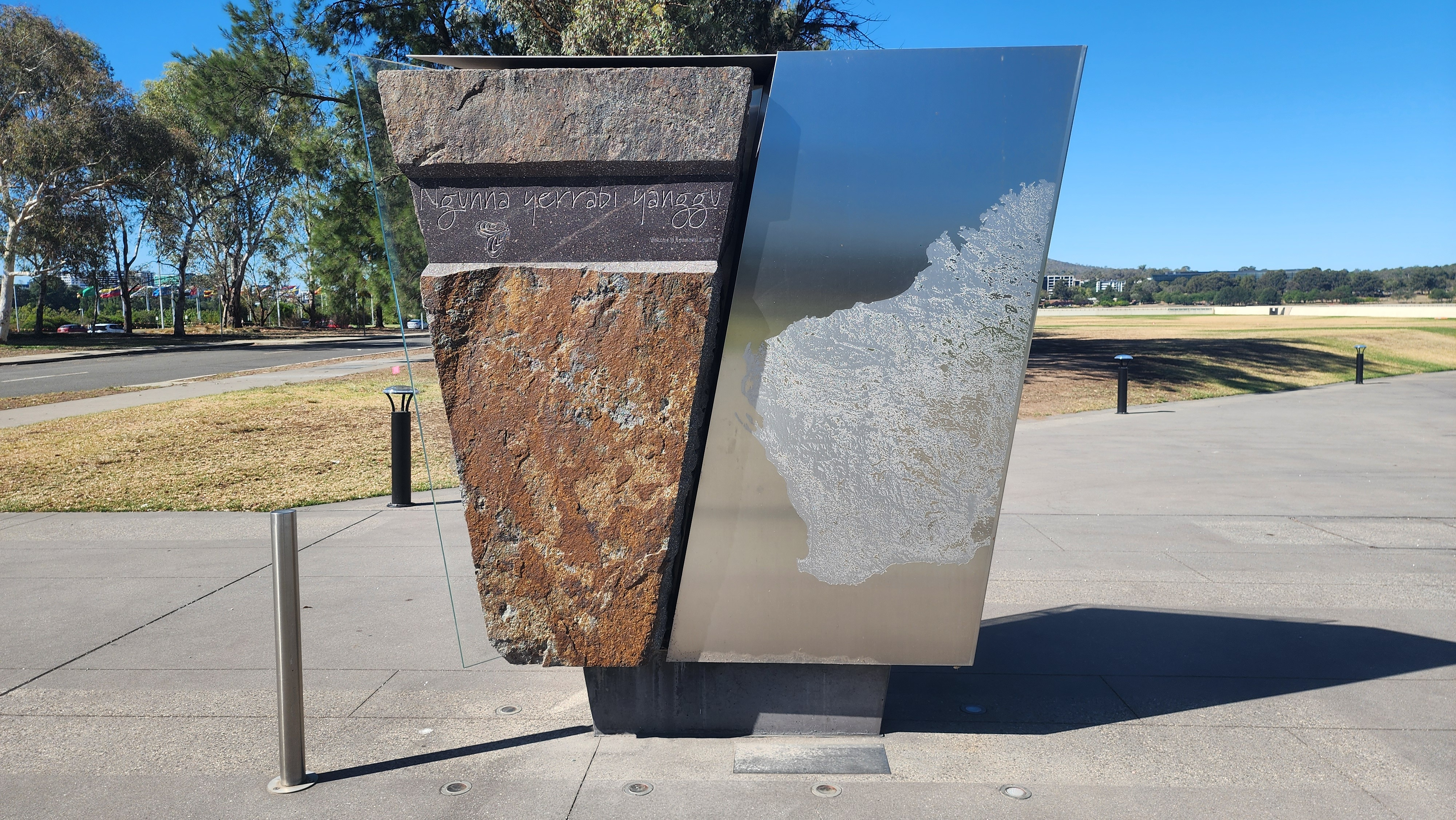
Ngunnawal (South face)

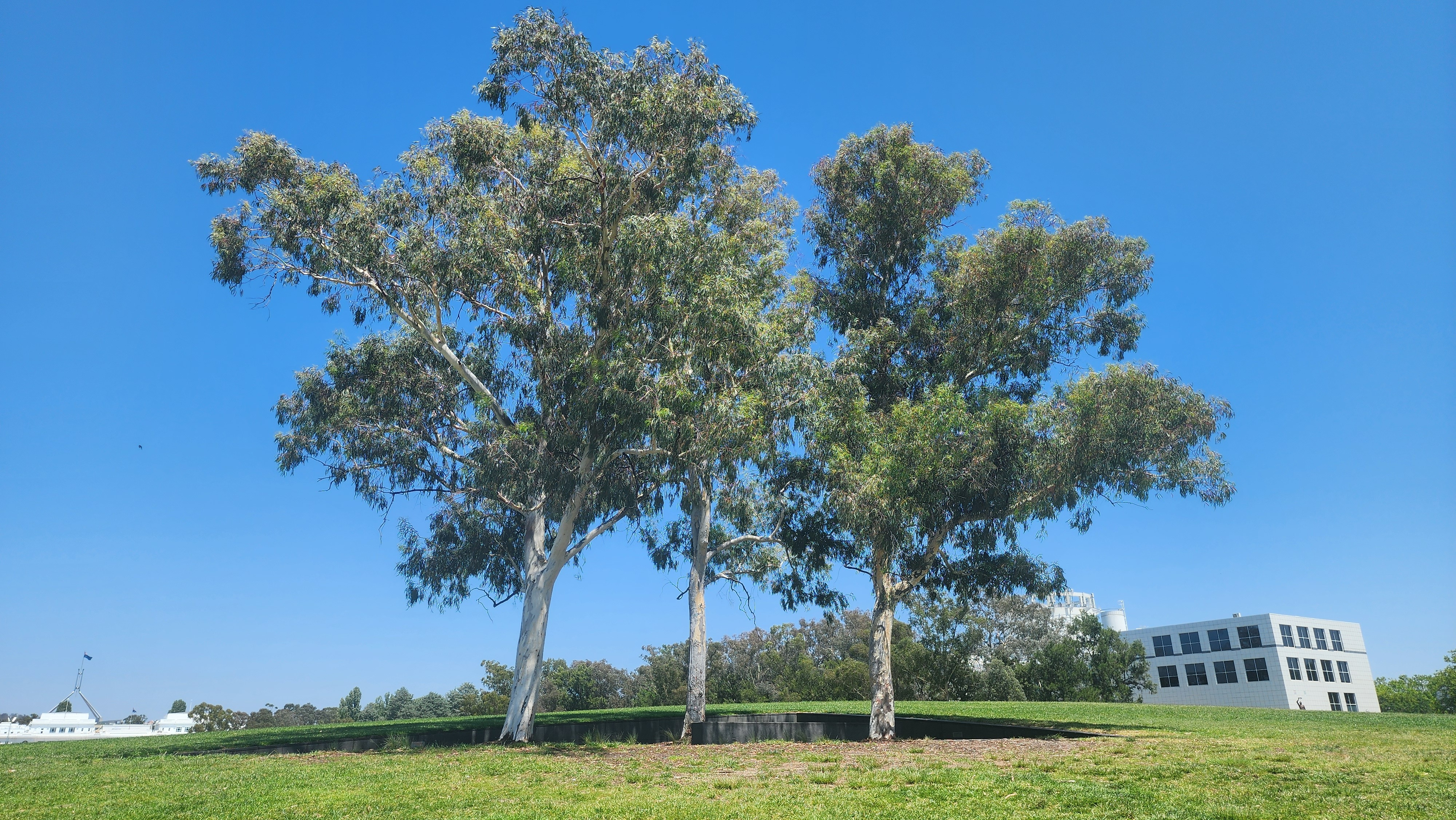
Tress in John Dunmore Lang Place

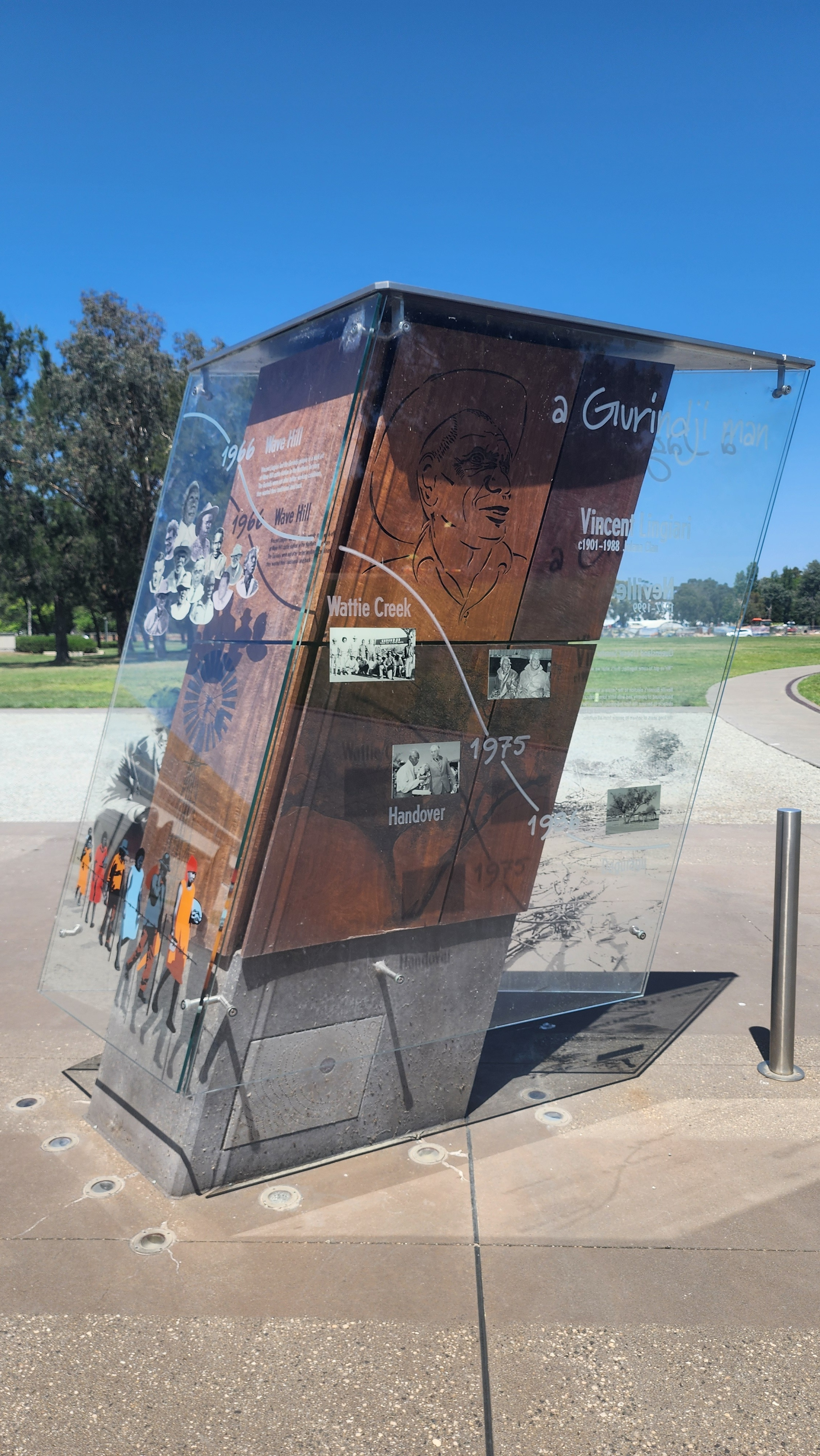
Leadership (North face)

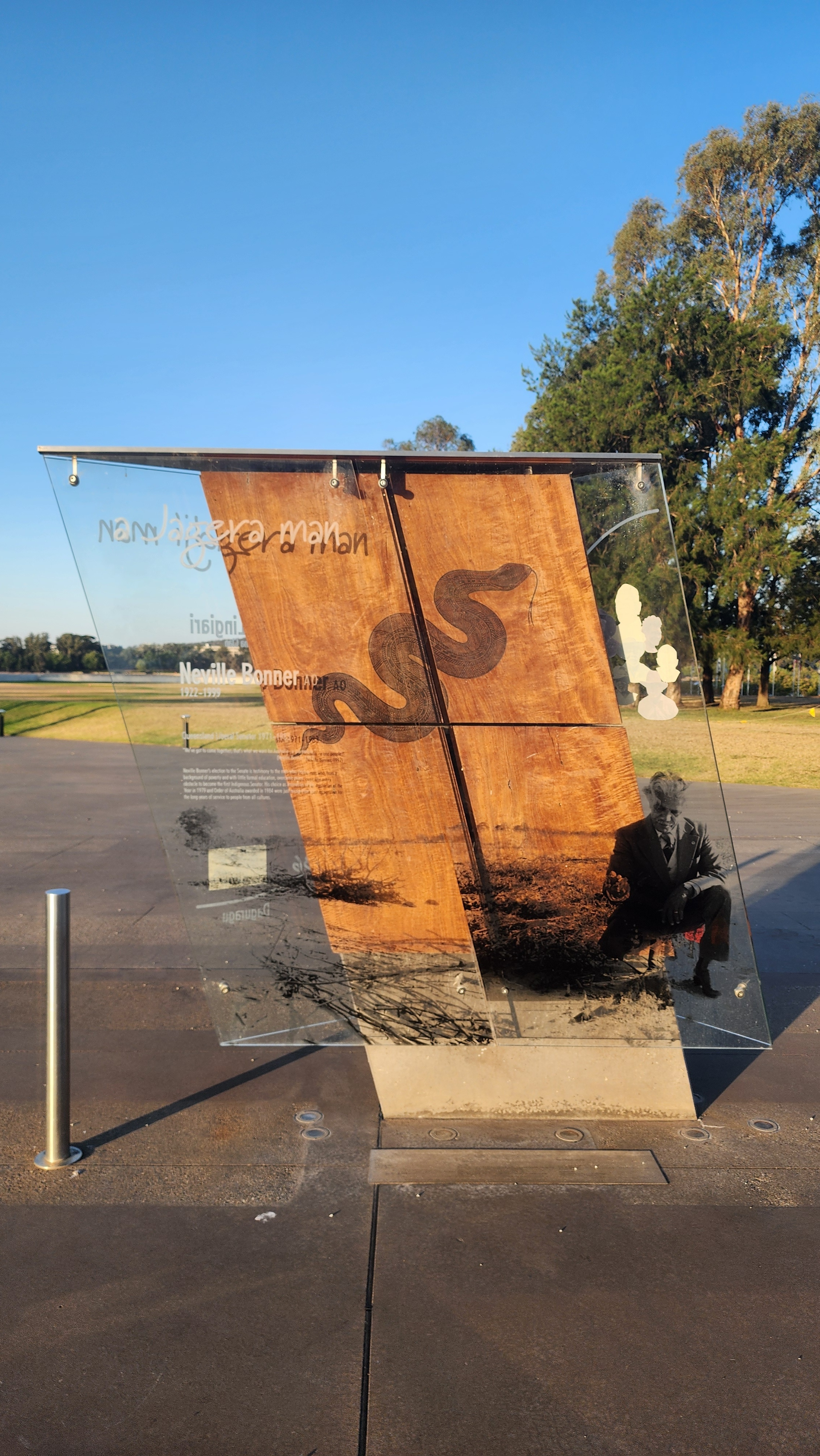
Leadership (South face)

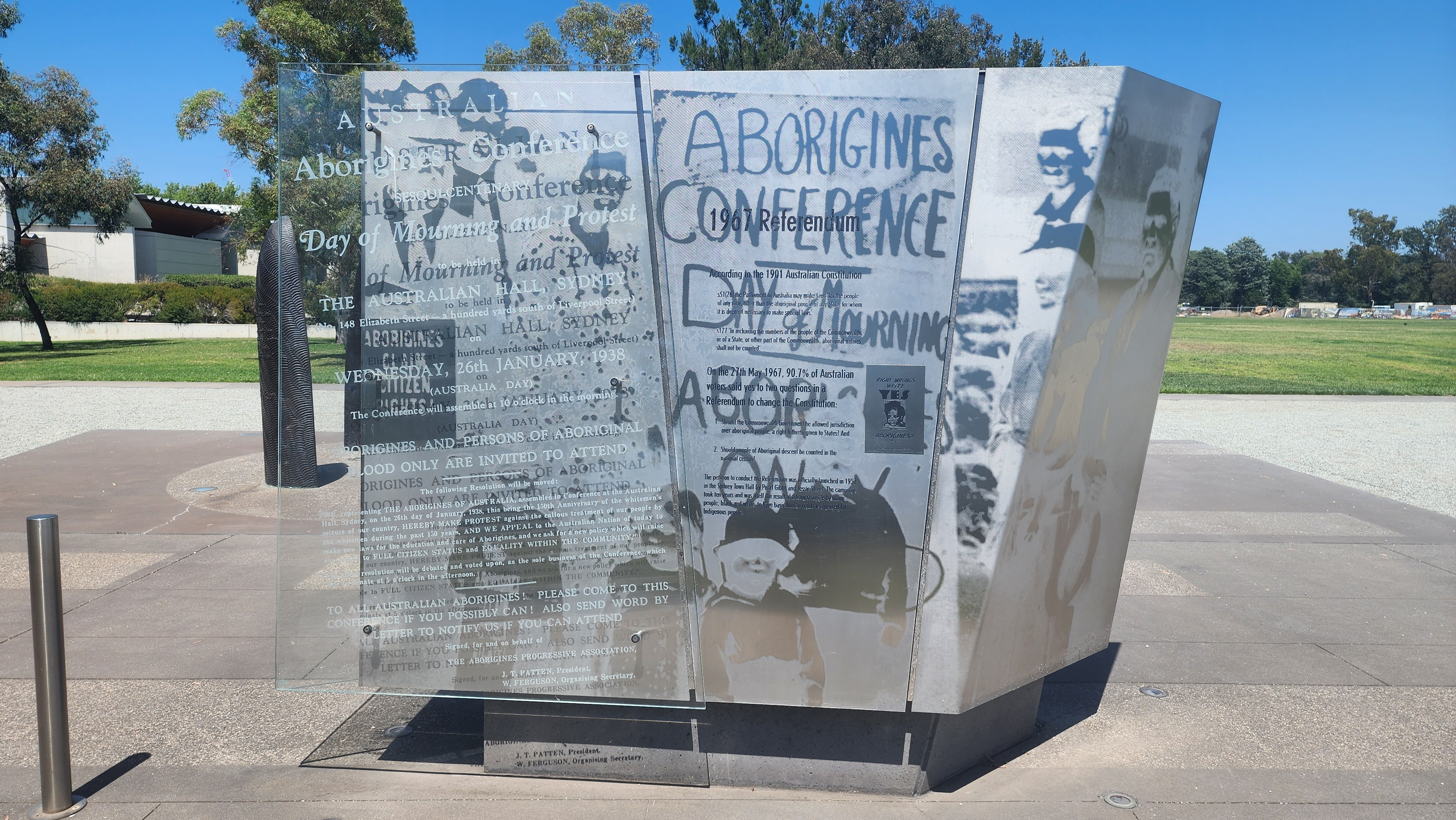
Referendum (North face)

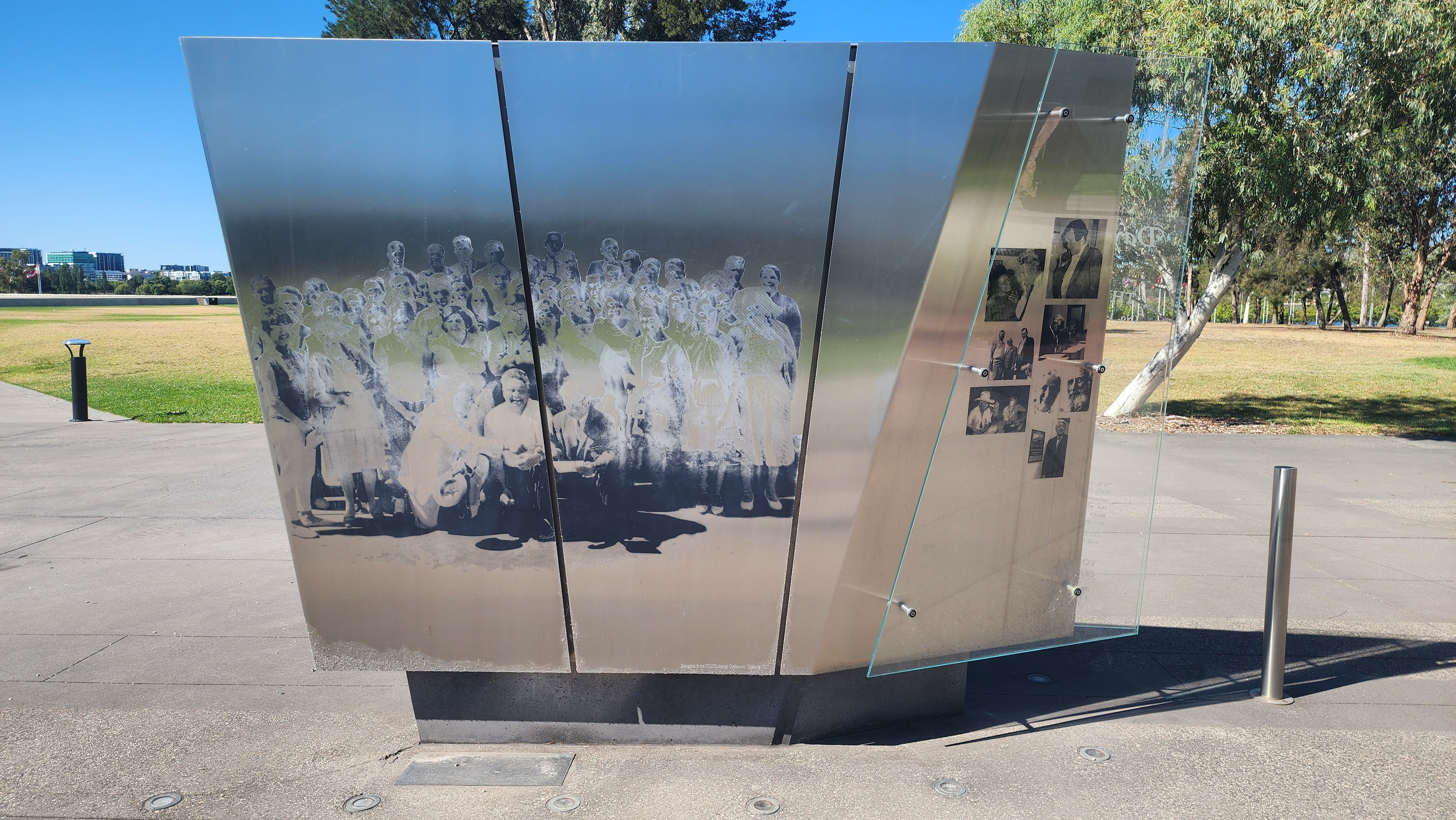
Referendum (South face)

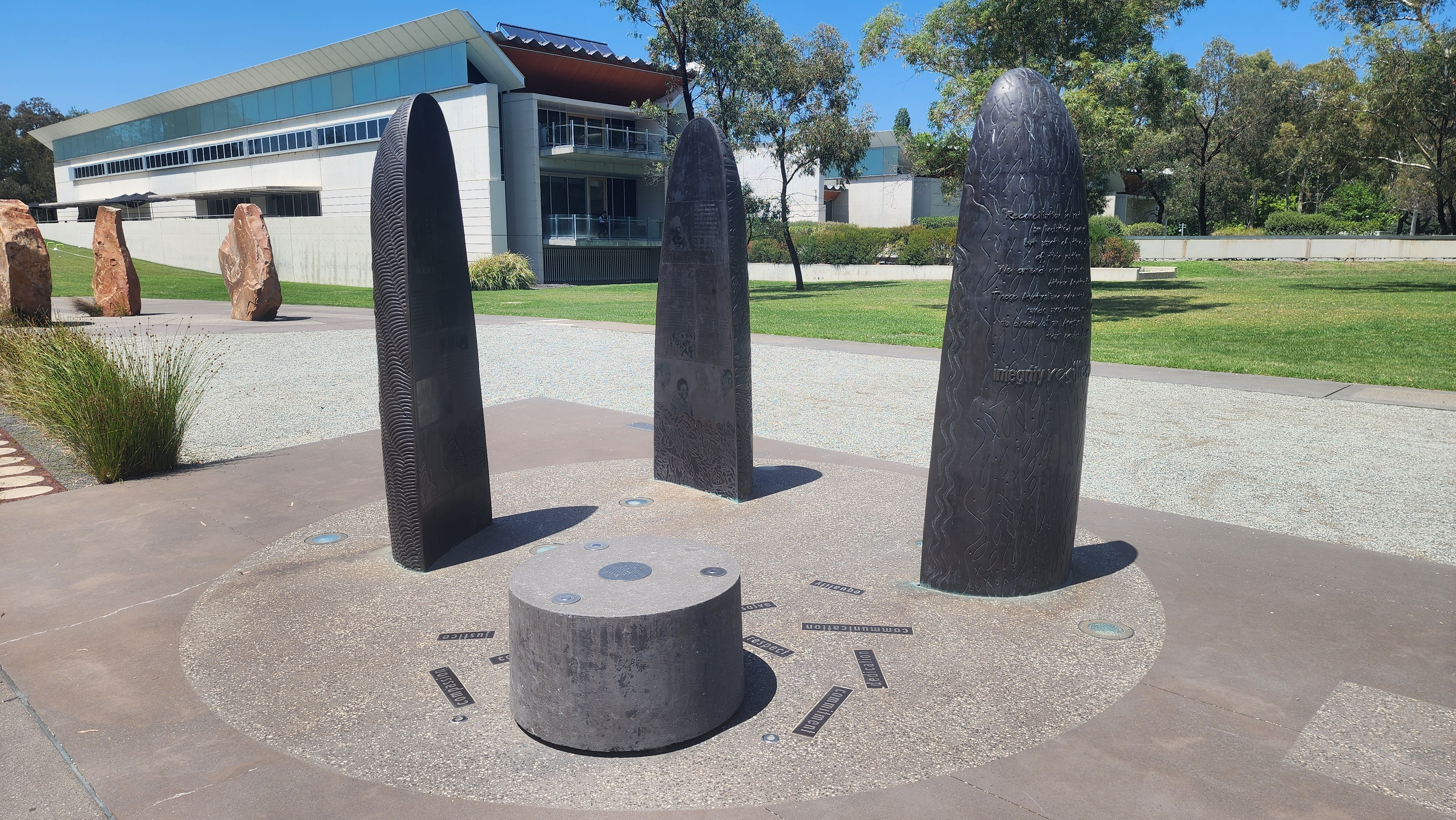
Women (North face)

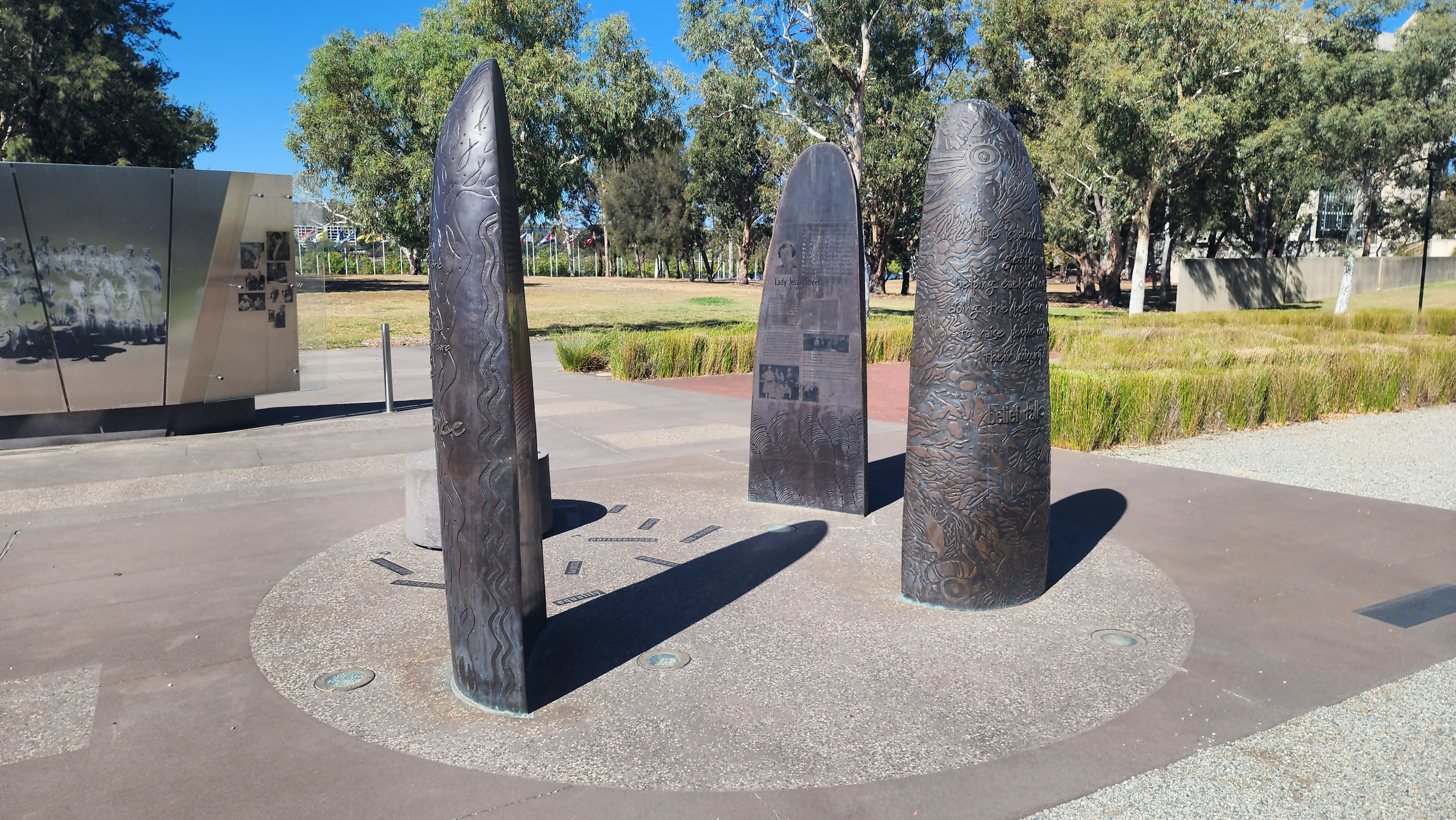
Women (South face)

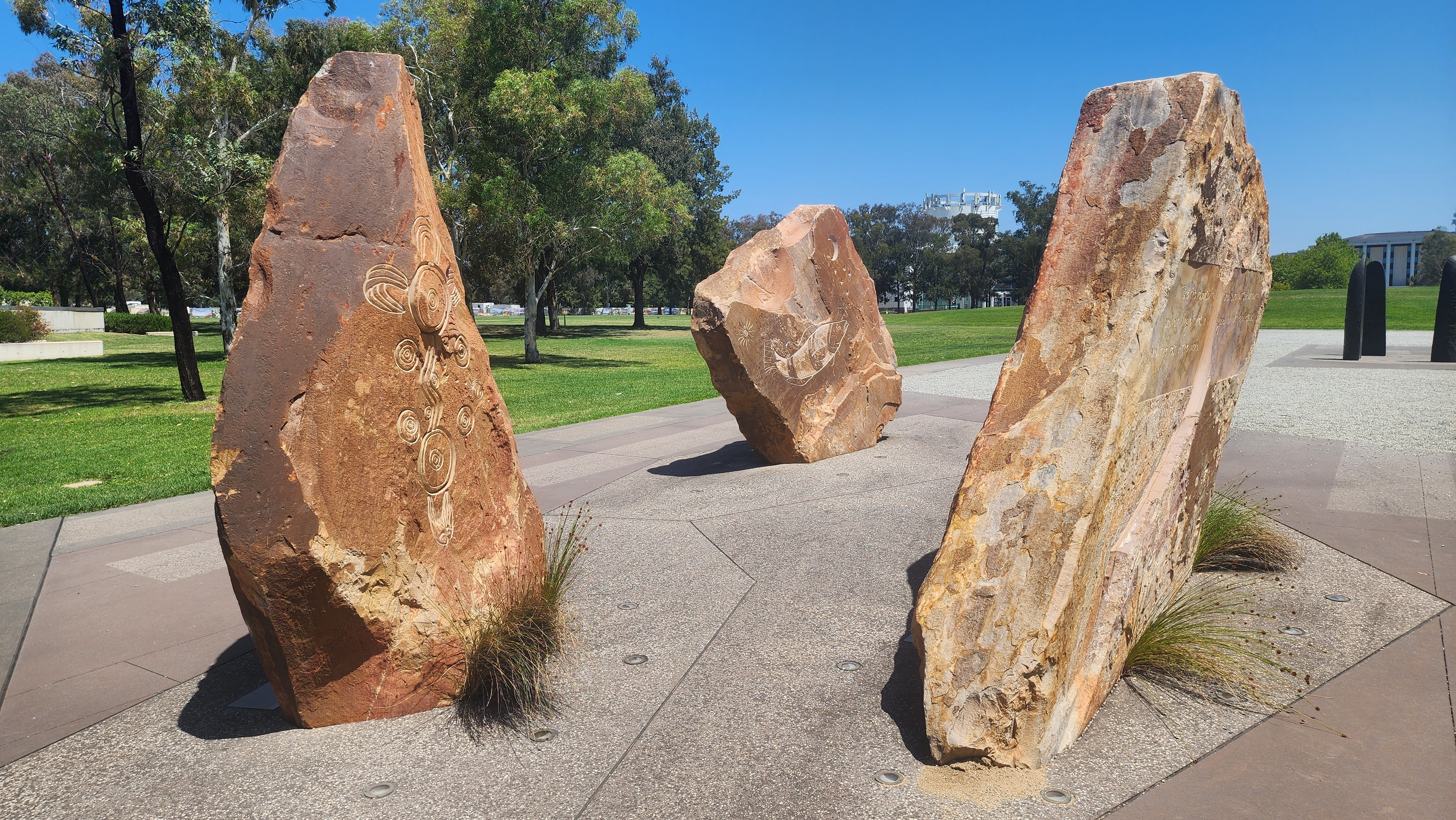
Stone Artworks (North face)

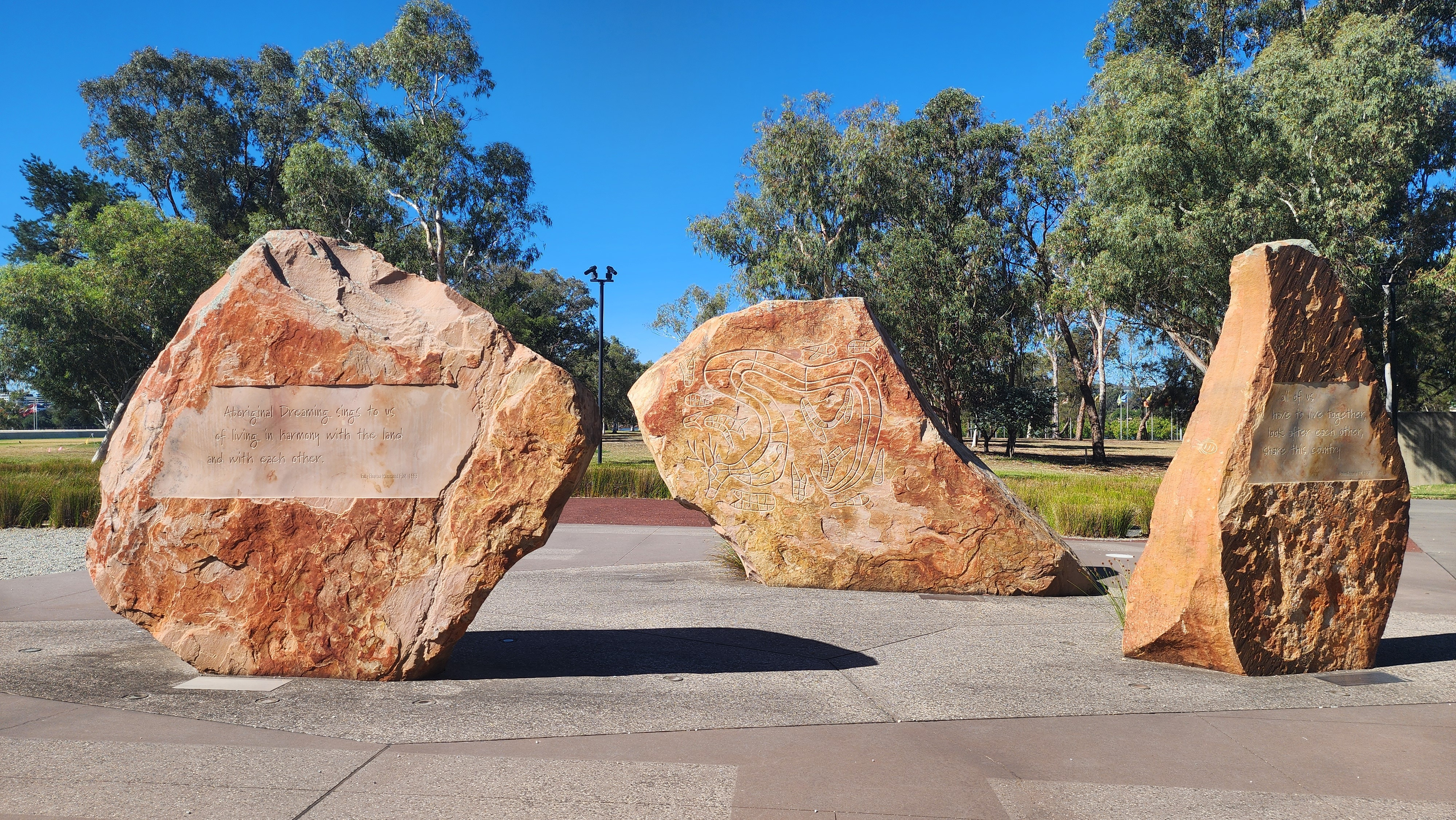
Stone Artworks (South face)-The left work is by Ruby Florence Hammond (1993), the middle work is by Robert Lee (2003) and the right work is by Wenten Rubuntja (1988)

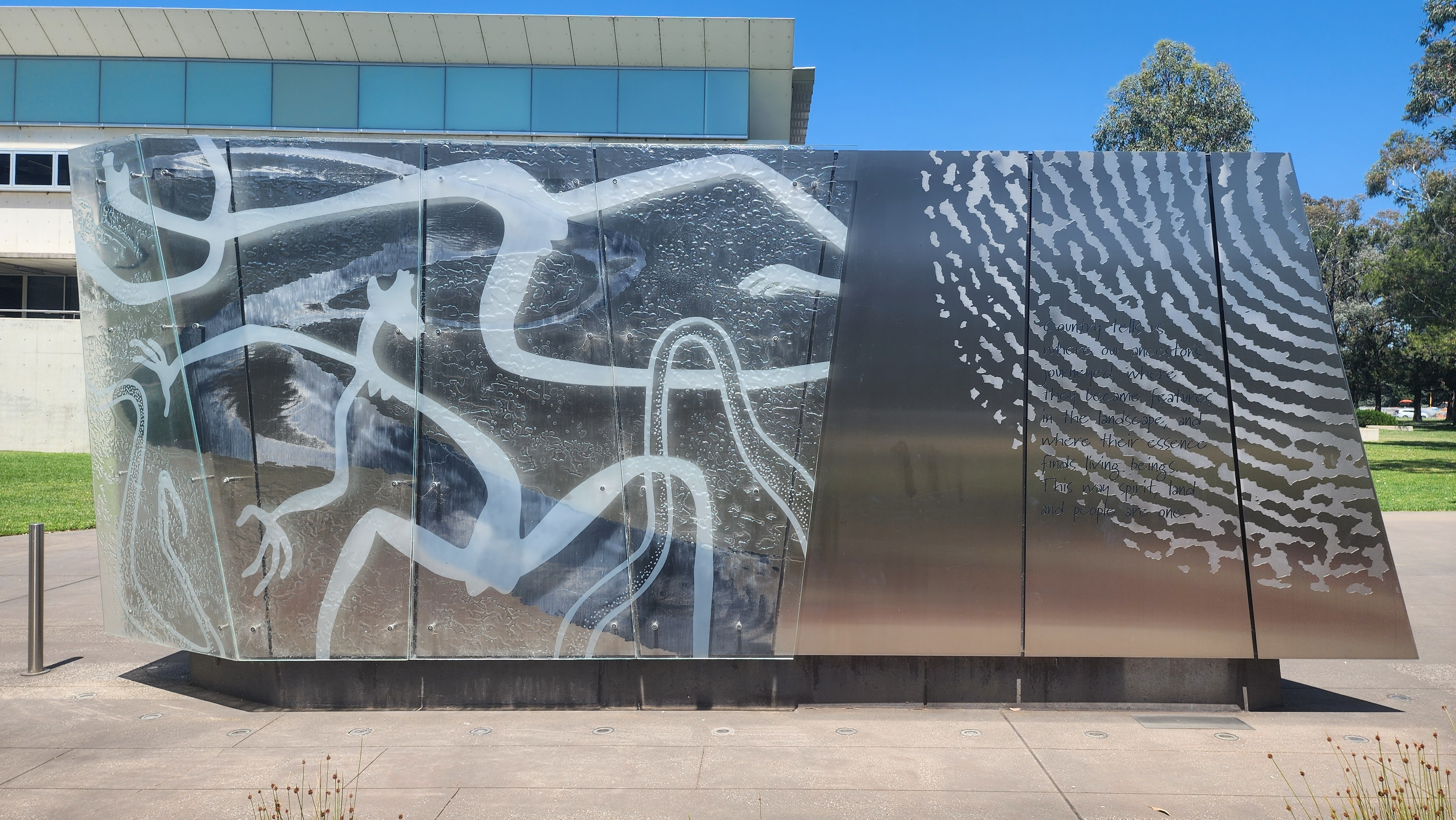
Land Rights (North face)

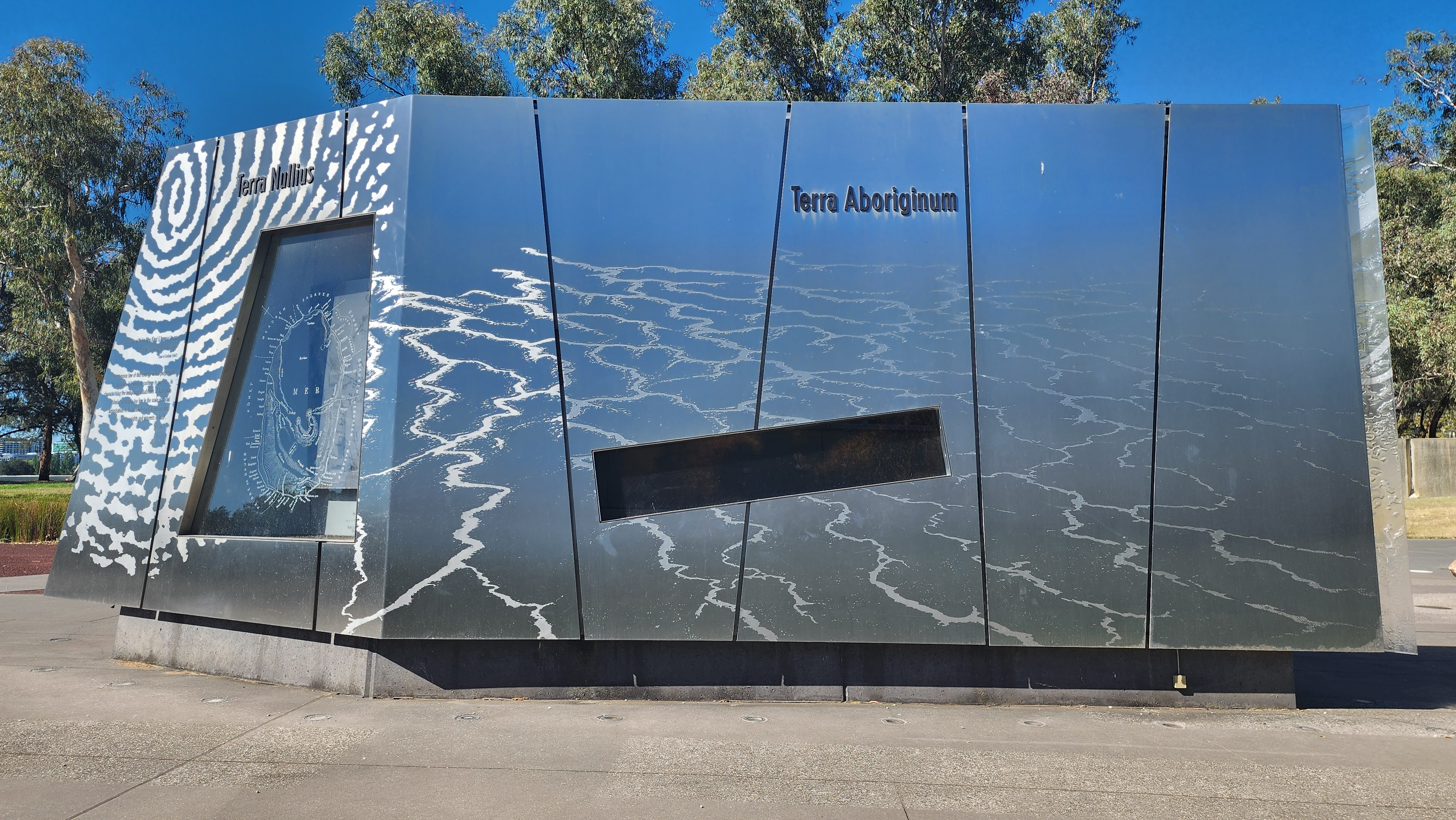
Land Rights (South face)

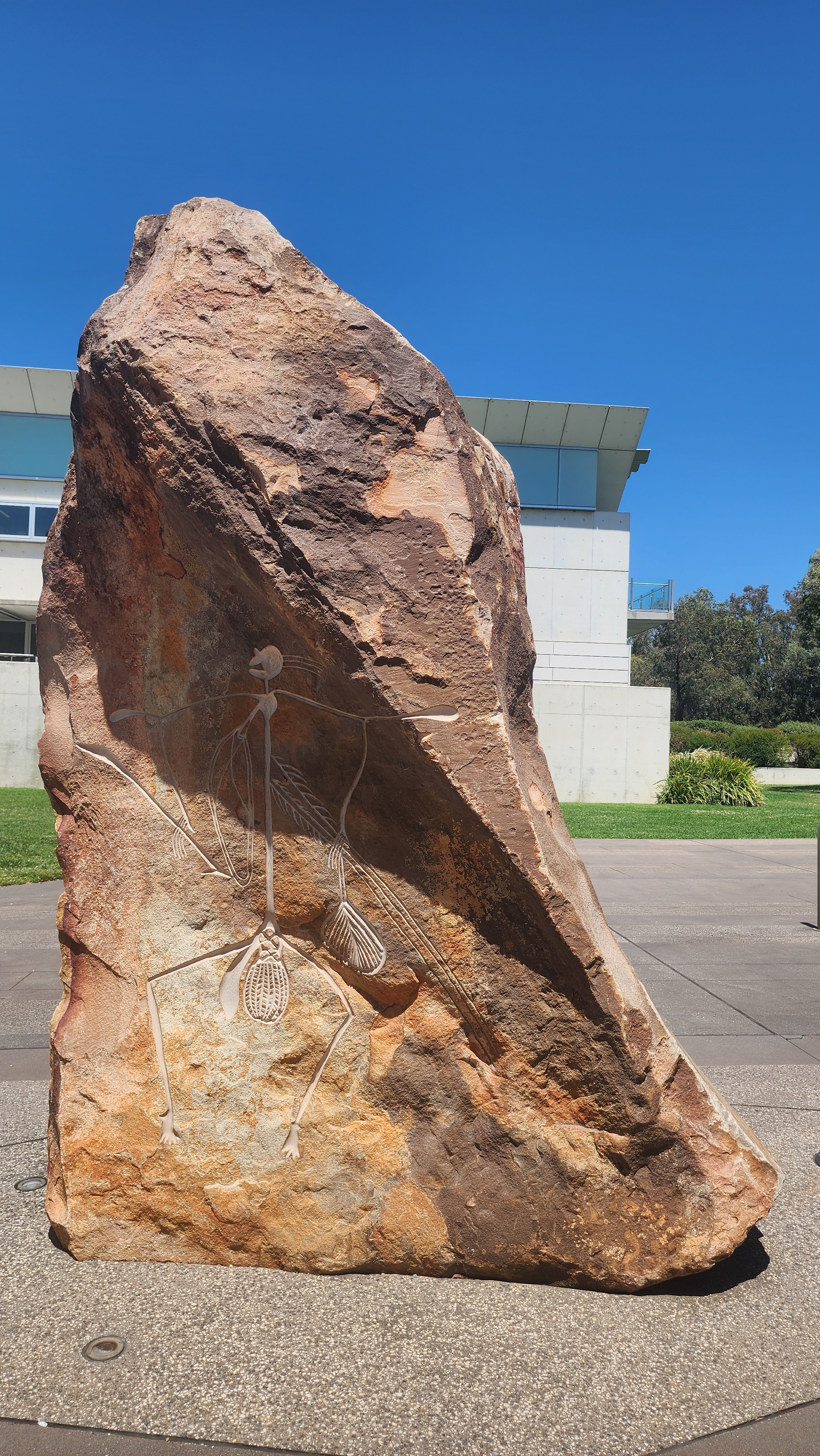
Spirit Warrior Figure by Nadji Family (North face) 1986

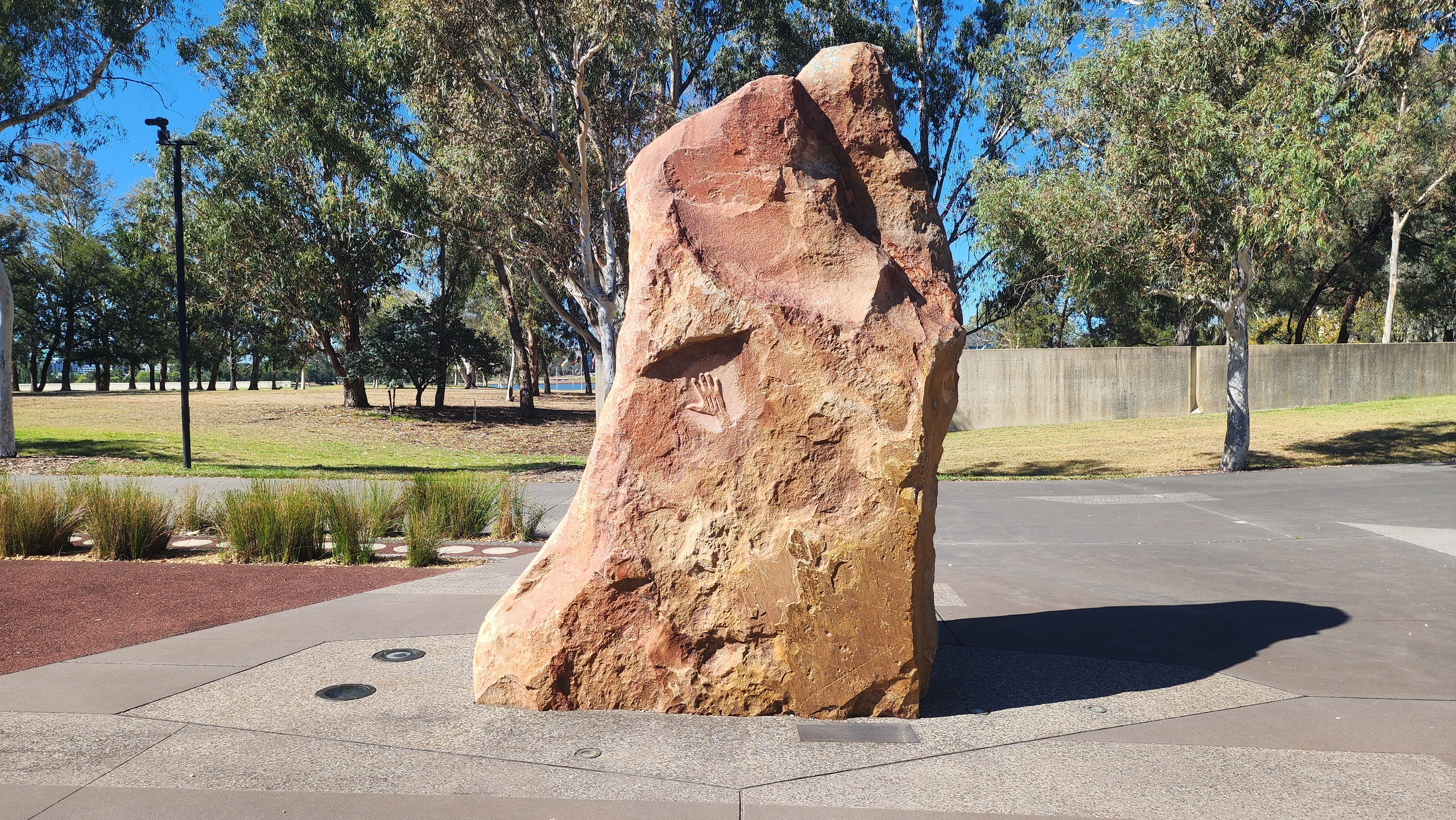
Spirit Warrior Figure by Nadji Family (South face) 1986

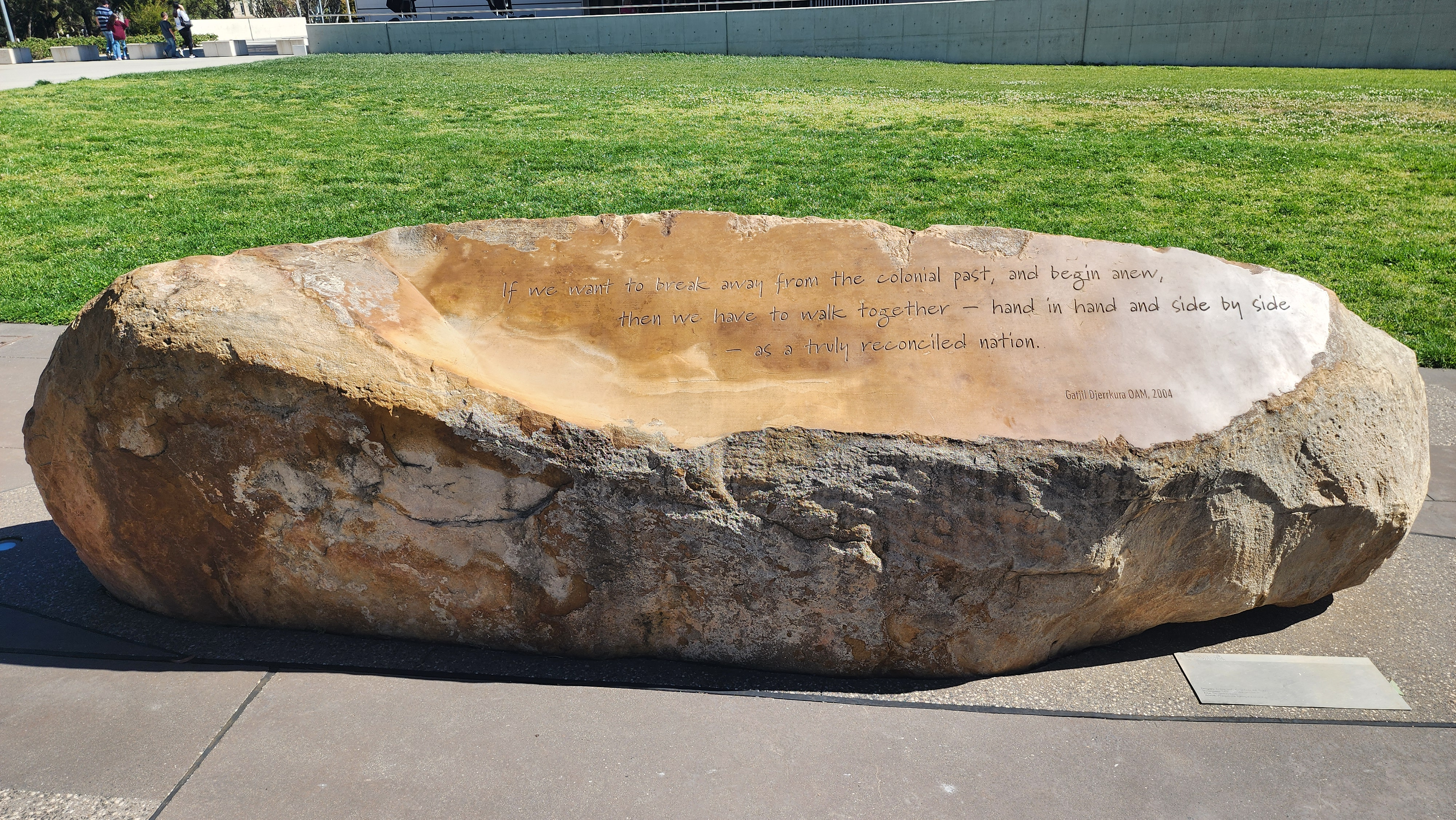
Stone Artwork by Gatjil Djerrkura (North face) 2004

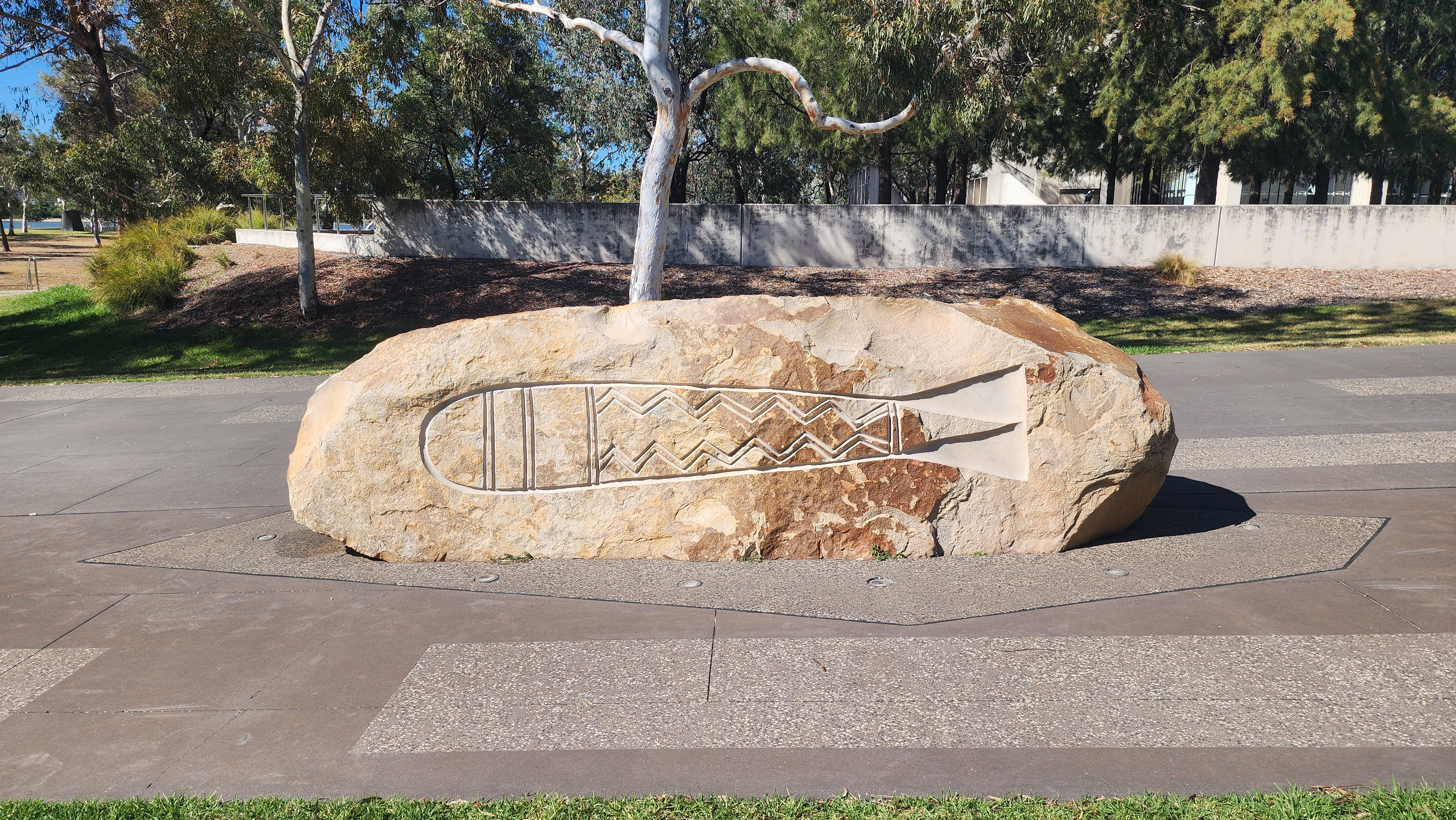
Stone Artwork by Gatjil Djerrkura (South face) 2004

== Construction ==
The construction of Reconciliation Place was limited to a total budget of AU$3.5M and a timeframe of four months for design and construction. Significant changes were made to the winning competition design by the government "National Capital Authority" responsible for managing the project. The mound height was diminished, ceramic paving intended for its surface was replaced by grass turf, and circulation directed around, rather than continuing over, the apex. Arced retaining walls embracing the mound were replaced by splayed earth berms. Later sculptures added to the promenade are autonomous installations and do not follow the concept of forming a macro landscape envisaged by the 'Slivers'. The intended tangential relationship of the ramp grade connecting to Commonwealth Place was not realised and "the view up the Commonwealth Place ramp from the lake’s edge is foreshortened and terminated".

Nevertheless, Reconciliation Place has proven successful as the chosen gathering place for major public festivals and events in Canberra, and as a resting point for workers and visitors to the Parliamentary Zone. Reconciliation Place and Commonwealth Place “amplify and enhance the crystalline geometry of the Griffins’ plan … Both are design achievements of which the nation can be proud”.
