= Judy Watson =

Australian artist

- Born: 1959 (age 66–67); Mundubbera, Queensland
- Education: University of Tasmania; Monash University
- Known for: Print-making, painting, installation
- Movement: Contemporary Indigenous Australian art

Judy Watson (born 1959) is an Australian Waanyi multi-media artist who works in print-making, painting, video and installation. Her work often examines Indigenous Australian histories, and she has received a number of high-profile commissions for public spaces.

== Early life and education ==
Judy Watson was born in Mundubbera, Queensland in 1959. She is a Brisbane-based Waanyi artist. She was educated at the Darling Downs Institute of Advanced Education In Toowoomba, where she received a Diploma of Creative Arts in 1979; at the University of Tasmania where she received a bachelor's degree (1980–82); and at Monash University, where she completed a graduate diploma in 1986. At Tasmania University she learned many techniques, among them lithography, which has influenced her entire body of work.

== Career ==
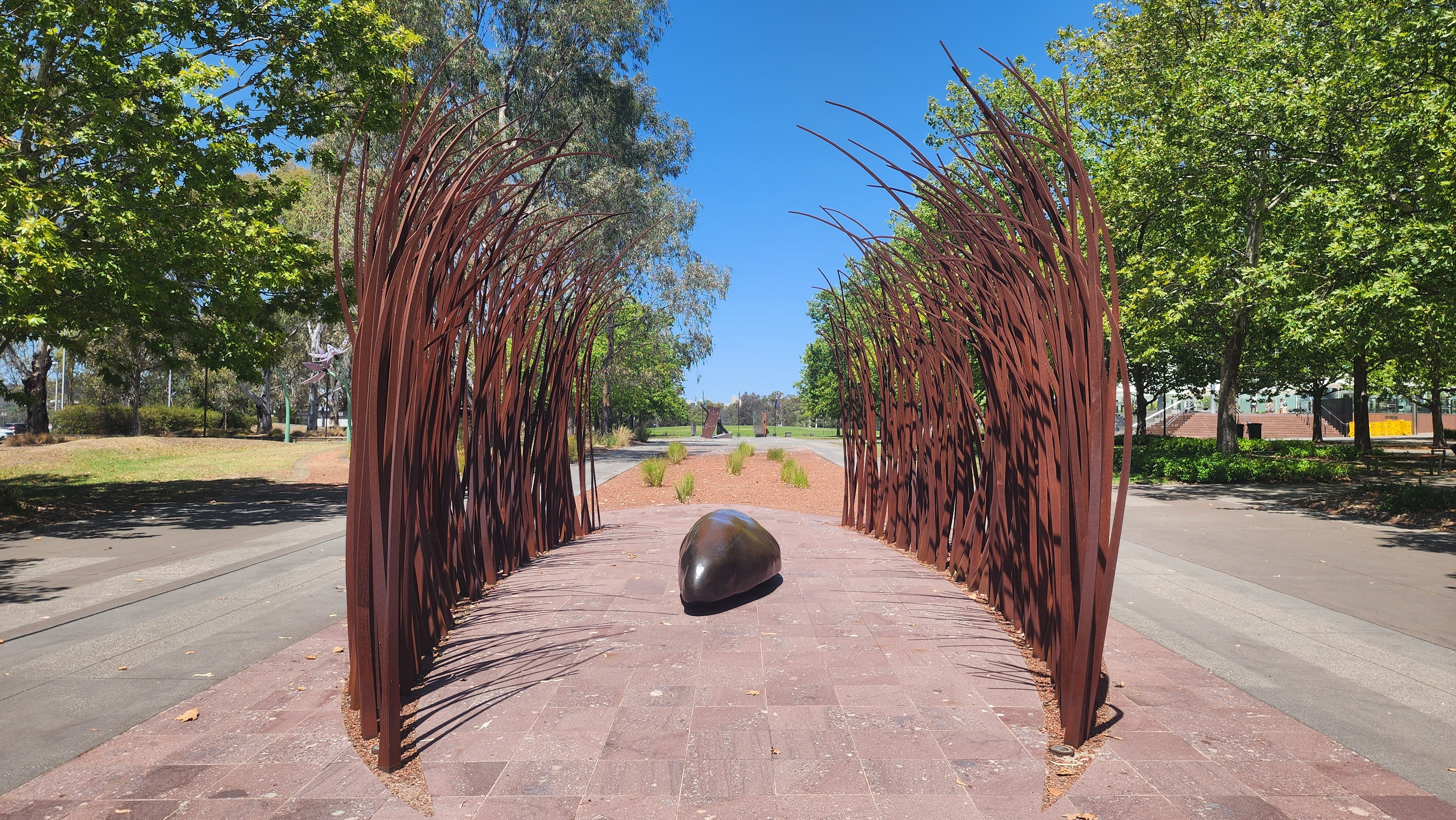
Sculpture Fire and Water (2007) by Judy Watson at Reconciliation Place in Canberra.

Watson trained as a print-maker, and her work in painting, video and installation often relies upon the use of layers to create a sense of different realities co-existing. As an Aboriginal Australian artist, the depiction of the land has an ongoing significance in her practice.

She won the Moët & Chandon Fellowship in 1995, allowing her to travel to France and later exhibit there. She represented Australia at the Venice Biennale in 1997, along with Yvonne Koolmatrie and Emily Kame Kngwarreye.

In 2005, for French architect Jean Nouvel's Musée du quai Branly, she constructed a site-specific work for the building along with a number of other key Aboriginal artists. A film was made about the project, titled The French Connection.

In 2008 Watson collaborated with Yhonnie Scarce to commemorate the escape of her great-great-grandmother Rosie from Lawn Hill Station in north-west Queensland, where the notoriously cruel Jack Watson was known for nailing up the ears of his victims, after shooting numerous Aboriginal people. For the work, the two artists cast 40 pairs of ears of volunteers and nailed them to a wall.

Her work is often highly political, however it is rarely didactic. She says that she tries to take a subtle and discreet approach to her art: "a seductive beautiful exterior with a strong message like a deadly poison dart that insinuates itself into the consciousness of the viewer without them being aware of the package until it implodes and leaks its contents."

She was commissioned by the City of Sydney to create a major public work of art for their Eora Journey arts program. The sculpture, titled bara would be located at the Royal Botanic Gardens in Sydney in 2020. The installation consists of a representation of bara, or fish hooks made for thousands of years by women from the local Eora nation.

=== Themes ===
In the book on Watson's work, blood language (2009), her practice is divided into a number of themes: water, skin, poison, dust and blood, ochre, bones, driftnet. The list indicates the range of natural and cultural forms that underpin her practice.

Watson's recent work can be understood as part of the archival turn in contemporary art. She examines Indigenous Australian histories. For example, a preponderance of aboriginal blood (2005) was commissioned by the State Library of Queensland to celebrate the Queensland centenary of women's suffrage and forty years of Aboriginal suffrage. The work uses documents from the Queensland State Archives about the way Aboriginal people were precluded from voting. Before suffrage was granted in 1965, eligibility to vote was based on the percentage of Aboriginal blood, hence Watson's title to her series. The series was recently acquired by Tate Modern in London.

A series of six engravings entitled the holes in the land (2015) is about the loss of Aboriginal cultural patrimony. In four of the six images Aboriginal cultural objects held in the British Museum are depicted. The title underscores the damage done to the land—the shadow, depression or blot on the landscape—removal has caused.

== Work ==
=== Solo/duo exhibitions ===
- 2024 mudunama kundana wandaraba jarribirri: Judy Watson, QAGOMA 23 Mar – 11 Aug 2024
- 2020–2021 Looking Glass: Judy Watson and Yhonnie Scarce, organised by the Ikon Gallery in Birmingham in collaboration with the TarraWarra Museum of Art in Victoria and curator Hetti Perkins, the exhibition showed at the Ikon Gallery from 4 March to 6 September 2020, and then at Turramurra from 28 November 2020 to 8 March 2021.
- 2016 the names of places, Green Screen, Institute of Modern Art, Brisbane
- 2015 the holes in the land, grahame galleries + editions, Brisbane
- 2015 the holes in the land; heron island suite, experimental beds, Toowoomba Regional Gallery
- 2014 sacred ground beating heart / experimental beds / heron island suite, Noosa Regional Gallery
- 2013 experimental beds, Brenda May Gallery, Sydney
- 2012 shell, Milani Gallery, Brisbane.
- experimental beds, University of Virginia, USA and grahame galleries + editions, Brisbane
- 2011 - 12 waterline, Tolarno Galleries, Melbourne and Embassy of Australia, Washington DC, US
- 2011 heron island suite, Touring Regional Galleries in Western Australia, New South Wales and Queensland
- 2010 heron island suite, grahame galleries + editions, Brisbane.
- 2009 - 12 heron island, University of Virginia, USA; grahame galleries + editions, Brisbane; and touring across Western Australia, New South Wales, and Queensland
- 2009 bad and doubtful debts, Milani Gallery, Brisbane.
- 2009 heron island, University of Queensland Art Museum; University of Queensland, Brisbane.
- 1993 Dropping into Water Slowly, Australian Girls Own Gallery, Canberra
- 1991 Inspiration – Expiration, Australian Girls Own Gallery, Canberra

=== Major group exhibitions ===
- Frames of Reference: Aspects of Feminism and Art, Artspace, 1991
- First Asia-Pacific Triennale of Contemporary Art, Queensland Art Gallery, 1993
- Antipodean Currents: Ten Contemporary Artists from Australia, Guggenheim Museum, New York, 1995
- A Gift to the World: The Australian Indigenous Art Commission at the Musée du quai Branly, Australian Indigenous Art Commission, 2005
- Cultural Warriors, Indigenous Art Triennale, National Gallery of Australia, 2007
- Reclaim the Earth, Palais de Tokyo, Paris, 2022

=== Public collections ===
- Art Gallery of New South Wales
- National Gallery of Australia
- Queensland Art Gallery
- Museum of Contemporary Art, Sydney
- Tate Modern, London
- National Gallery of Victoria, Melbourne
- Tasmanian Museum and Art Gallery, Hobart
- Museum of New Zealand Te Papa Tongarewa, Wellington

=== Awards and nominations ===
- Moet and Chandon Fellowship 1995
- National Gallery of Victoria's Clemenger Art Award 2006
- Works on Paper Award at the 23rd National Aboriginal and Torres Strait Islander Awards 2006

=== Legacy ===
- In 2011 Judy Watson was interviewed in a digital story and oral history for the State Library of Queensland's James C Sourris AM Collection. In the interview Watson talks to writer Louise Martin-Chew about her art practice, her family and the future of Aboriginal art in Australia.
