= List of Australian art critics (news periodicals) =

This is a sortable list of Australian art critics who wrote for major newspapers in the nineteenth and twentieth centuries, during which such periodicals carried the majority of current, contemporaneous art criticism; and the 21st century when most such papers ceased art reviews.

Of the role of the critic Baudelaire in the chapter A quoi bon la critique in Le salon de 1846, published posthumously in Curiosités esthétiques in 1868, declared:

As for criticism itself, I hope that philosophers will understand what I am going to say: to be just, as its very reason for being, criticism must be partial, passionate, political, as made from an exclusive point of view, but from the point of view which opens the most horizons."

Australian sculptor and academic, Judy Hamilton writes to distinguish this genre:

...criticism that appears in newspapers is written for a general audience, and the real substance of newspaper art criticism can best be summed up as providing an antidote for the 'vernacular glance'. This term, coined by art historian Brian O'Doherty in 1974, refers to the modern phenomenon of viewing an exhibition casually, with eyes darting indiscriminately from object to object in an ineffectual effort to take in the entire exhibition at once. The work of the critic is effectively to map an exhibition for an audience, and thereby transform the vernacular glance into an informed glance that is capable of discerning either meaning or emptiness in the work on show.

Barker and Green, noting the number of art critics writing for Australian newspapers in the 1970s, consider that 'this writing was essentially ephemeral, based on the assessment of the wide spectrum of ... exclusively local, art exhibitions. It was essentially a form of reportage.

In 2012 Osborne, writing in the Australian Art Monthly, noticed a general devaluing and disparagement of the newspaper critic and warned that:

... the progressively weakened position of newspaper art criticism and the threat of it disappearing altogether from mass market newspapers ... could have far-reaching repercussions ... a nodal rupture in the network of relationships between the art world and the wider public. The complex ecology of the art world needs this link with the wider public. It needs a healthy balance between critical writing in art journals and newspapers.

Australian nineteenth- and twentieth-century newspaper and magazine critics.
Name	Life	Newspaper or magazine	Dates	Gender
Bruce Adams	1950–	The Australian	1972–74	M
Bruce Adams	1950–	The Sunday Telegraph (Sydney)	1972–74	M
Christopher Allen	1953–	Australian Financial Review	2005–2008	M
Mary Cecil Allen	1893–1962	The Sun News-Pictorial	1925-26	F
Christopher Allen	1953–	The Australian	2008>	M
Christopher Allen	1953–	The Sydney Morning Herald	1987–1991	M
Julian Howard Ashton	1877–1964	The Argus	1910–11	M
Julian Howard Ashton	1877–1964	Sydney Sun	c.1912–c.1936	M
Giles Auty	1934–2020	The Australian	1995–2001	M
Harold John Baily	1927–2015	Sunday Mail (S.A.)	1963–64	M
George Bell	1878–1966	The Sun News-Pictorial	1923–50	M
Peter Richard Bellew	1912–1986	The Sydney Morning Herald	1939–42	M
George Courtney Benson	1886–1960	The West Australian	1931>?	M
Simon Blond		The West Australian	2002-4	M
Nancy Borlase	1914–	The Sydney Morning Herald	1973–81	F
Nancy Borlase	1914–	The Bulletin	1972–73	F
Stephanie Britton		The News (S.A.)	1971–77	F
Stephanie Britton		Sunday Mail (S.A.)	1980	F
David Bromfield	1947–2024	The West Australian	late 80s–1990s	M
Donald Brook	1927–2018	Canberra Times	c.1964–65	M
Donald Brook	1927–2018	The Sydney Morning Herald	1968–1973?	M
Basil Burdett	1897–1942	Brisbane Daily Mail	1919–21	M
Basil Burdett	1897–1942	Herald (Melbourne)	1936	M
Carolyn Burke	1940–1989	Various international, incl. The New York Times	1990>	F
Charles William Bush	1919–1989	The Australian	1966	M
Jean Campbell	1901–1984	The Advertiser	1952–1974	F
Jean Campbell	1901–1984	The Courier-Mail	1952–1974?	F
Tom Carrington	1843–1918	The Argus	>1918	M
Tom Carrington	1843–1918	The Australasian	1889	M
Gary Catalano	1947–2002	The Age	1985–1990	M
Jack Cato	1889-1971	The Age	1960-63	M
Harold Pierce Cazneaux	1878–1953	Sydney Mail	??	M
Harold Pierce Cazneaux	1878–1953	The Lone Hand	??	M
Dora Chapman	1911–1995	The Advertiser	1958–69	F
Betty Churcher	1931–2015	The Australian	1972–75	F
Anna Clabburn		The Age	1997-1999	F
Alexander Colquhoun	1862–1941	Herald (Melbourne)	1914–1922	M
Alexander Colquhoun	1862–1941	The Age	1926–1941	M
Arthur Vollens Cook	1909–1967	The Age	1946–57	M
William Edward James Cook	1904–1960	Daily Telegraph	1952–1959	M
Professor Charles Gordon Cooper	?	The Courier-Mail	c.1940s	M
Sue Cramer		The Age		F
Elizabeth Cross	1943–	The Sydney Morning Herald	1990s	F
Elizabeth Cross	1943–	The Age	??	F
Geoffrey de Groen	1938–	Canberra Times	1973–77	M
Geoffrey de Groen	1938–	National Times	1973–77	M
Lyn DiCerio		The West Australian	2009-2023	F
Sidney Dickinson	1851–1919	Australasian Critic	1889–91	M
David Dolan	1949–2011	The Advertiser	1977–80	M
David Dolan	1949–2011	Sunday Mail (S.A.)	1974–77	M
Geoffrey Dutton	1922–1998	The News (S.A.)	1958–62	M
Mary Eagle	1944	The Age	1977–1980	F
Helen Ennis	195-	Canberra Times	1991–1995	F
Ruth Faerber	1922–2024	Australian Jewish Times	1970s	F
Beatrice Faust	1939–2019	The Age	1970s	F
Beatrice Faust	1939–2019	National Times	1970s	F
Frank Fitzgerald	1922–2017	The Argus	1940s	M
Ivor Francis	1906–1993	The News (S.A.)	1944–1955	M
Ivor Francis	1906–1993	Sunday Mail (S.A.)	1964–74	M
Ivor Francis	1906–1993	The Advertiser	1974–76	M
Freda Freiberg	1933–2024	The Age	1990s	F
Andrew Frost		Guardian Australia	Current	M
H.E. Fuller		The Advertiser	1931-52	M
Ann Galbally	1945–	The Age	1970s	F
Benjamin Genocchio	1969–	The Australian	1998–2002	M
Esmond George	1888–1959	Sunday Mail (S.A.)	1946–c.1966	M
James Gleeson	1915–2008	Sun-Herald	1962–74	M
James Gleeson	1915–2008	Sydney Sun	1949–74	M
Craig Gough	1938–	Sunday Times (WA)	1972–73	M
Sasha Grishin	1950–	Canberra Times	1977–2023	M
Paul Haefliger	1914–1982	The Sydney Morning Herald	1941–1957	M
Charles (‘C.G.’) Hamilton	1874–1967	West Australian	1946-64	M
William Hannon	1932–2020	The Bulletin	1960–65	M
Royston Harpur	1938–2023	Sydney Observer	1960	M
Royston Harpur	1938–2023	The Australian	1971	M
Henry Bromilow Harrison	1878–1948	The Argus	1912–1943	M
Henry Bromilow Harrison	1878–1948	The Australian	??	M
Christopher Heathcote		The Age	1990s	M
Edward Bonaventura Heffernan	1912–1992	Geelong Advertiser	1966–74	M
Paul Heinrich		The Age	1970s–1980s	M
Paul Heinrich		The National Times	1980s	M
John George Henshaw	1929–2006	The Australian	1969–70	M
Harold Herbert	1891–1945	The Sun News-Pictorial	c1936>	M
Harold Herbert	1891–1945	The Argus	c1936>	M
Harold Herbert	1891–1945	The Australasian	1927–1934...	M
Harold Herbert	1891–1945	The Australasian	c.1932	M
Memory Holloway	1946–	The Melbourne Times	1977–78	F
Memory Holloway	1946–	The Australian	1978–81	F
Memory Holloway	1946–	The Age	1982–86	F
Robert Hughes	1938–2012	The Age	1963–c.1970	M
Robert Hughes	1938–2012	Sydney Observer	1958–59	M
Robert Hughes	1938–2012	Nation Review	1959–1963	M
Robert Hughes	1938–2012	Sunday Mirror	1963	M
Pamela Irving	1960–	Geelong Advertiser	c.1980s	F
Michael Hutak		The Bulletin	1999–2007	M
Michael Hutak		The Sydney Morning Herald	>1997	M
Patrick Hutchings	1929–	The Bulletin	1961...	M
Lou Klepac	1936–	The News (S.A.)	1967–70	M
Gertrude Langer	1908–1984	The Courier-Mail	1953–1984	F
G. Ross Lansell	?	Nation Review	1966–67	M
G. Ross Lansell	?	Daily Telegraph	1967–78	M
Adrian Lawlor	1889–1969	The Bulletin	1921–23	M
Percy Leason	1889–1959	Table Talk	1929–1933...	M
Malcolm (Mal) John Sewart Leckie	1952	Goldcoast City Bulletin	1978	M
Raymond Lindsay	1903–1960	Daily Telegraph	1940>	M
Lionel Lindsay	1874–1961	The Bulletin	1890s–1900s	M
Lionel Lindsay	1874–1961	The Lone Hand	1907–21	M
Lionel Lindsay	1874–1961	Herald (Melbourne)	1935	M
Norman Lindsay	1879–1969	The Lone Hand	Occasional c.1907–21	M
Marie Therese Loureiro	?–1907	The Age	late 1800s	F
John Samuel Loxton	1903–1971	The Argus	1947–48	M
Elwyn Lynn	1917–1997	Nation Review	1969	M
Elwyn Lynn	1917–1997	Sunday Mirror	1963	M
Elwyn Lynn	1917–1997	The Australian		M
Elwyn Lynn	1917–1997	The Bulletin	1966–1973	M
James Stuart MacDonald	1878–1952	Herald (Melbourne)	1923...	M
James Stuart MacDonald	1878–1952	The Age	1943–47	M
Norman Macgeorge	1872–1952	Herald (Melbourne)	Late 1930s	M
Marguerite Mahood	1901–1989	Radio and Listener In	Mid-1920s	F
Jeffrey Makin	1943	The Sun News-Pictorial	1972–87	M
Jeffrey Makin	1943	Herald Sun	1997-2009	M
Terence Maloon	1950–	The Sydney Morning Herald	1982–1987	M
Anne Marsh	1956–	Herald Sun	1994-1997	F
John Baxter Mather	1853–1940	The Advertiser	1889–1904	M
Patrick McCaughey	1942–	The Age	1966–69 1971–74	M
Alan McLeod McCulloch	1907–1992	The Argus	1944–1947	M
Alan McLeod McCulloch	1907–1992	Herald (Melbourne)	1951–1981	M
Susan McCulloch	1949–	The Age	1980s	F
Susan McCulloch	1949–	The Sun News-Pictorial	1980s	F
Susan McCulloch	1949–	The Australian	1994–2004	F
Susan McCulloch	1949–	The Bulletin	1980s	F
John McDonald	1961	The Sydney Morning Herald	1987–2017 ?	M
Robert McFarlane	1942-2023	The Sydney Morning Herald	1970s-1990s	M
Sandra McGrath	1936	The Australian	1972	F
Sandra McGrath	1936	The Bulletin	occasional	F
Colin MacInnes	1914–1976	London Observer	1948–50	M
Arthur McIntyre	1945–2003	The Australian	1977–78	M
Arthur McIntyre	1945–2003	The Age	1980s	M
Alan Lester McIntyre	1913–2002	Examiner	1960s?	M
Alan Lester McIntyre	1913–2002	The Bulletin	pre-WW2	M
Alan Lester McIntyre	1913–2002	Smiths Weekly	pre-WW2	M
Thomas Firmin McKinnon	1878–1953	The Courier-Mail	1940s–1950s	M
Matthew James McNally	1874–1943	Daily Telegraph	occasional	M
Matthew James McNally	1874–1943	The News (South Australia)	occasional	M
Matthew James McNally	1874–1943	The Mail (South Australia)	occasional	M
Ian North		The News (South Australia)	1971–72 1974	M
Joanna Mendelssohn	1949–	The Bulletin	1988>	F
Hilary (nee Hunter) Merrifield		West Australian	1960s	F
Ronald Grenville Millar	1927	The Australian	1965–70	M
Ronald Grenville Millar	1927	Herald (Melbourne)	1965 1981–93	M
William Moore	1868–1937	The Courier-Mail	c.1919>	M
William Moore	1868–1937	Daily Telegraph	c.1919>	M
William Moore	1868–1937	Herald (Melbourne)	1904>	M
John Frank Williams	1933–2016	The Australian	1973–1977	M
Robert Nelson	1957–	The Age	1984–1990s	M
Greg Neville	1951–	The Age	1990–1993	M
Gino Nibbi	1896–1969	Herald (Melbourne)	occasional	M
Clifton Thomas Almont Peir	1905–1985	The Sunday Mirror	1961–62	M
Tony Perry	?	The Age	1978–1981	M
Ernest Sidney Philpot	1906–1985	Sunday Times (WA)	1961–65	M
William Pidgeon	1909–1981	Daily Telegraph	1974–1979	M
Margaret Plant	1940	The Age	1965-1970	F
Margaret Plant	1940	The Australian	1965-1970	F
Margaret Preston	1875–1963	Art in Australia	1924–1940	F
Elizabeth Riddell	1910–1998	The Australian	1960s	F
Robert Rooney	1937–2017	The Age	1980 – July 1982	M
Robert Rooney	1937–2017	The Australian	1982–99	M
Christine Alexandra (Sanders) Ross	1944	Newcastle Morning Herald	1971–	M
Brian Seidel	1928–2019	The News (S.A.)	1963–1966	M
David Michael Shannon	1927–1993	The Australian	1973–75	M
Noel Sheridan	1936-2006	Sunday Mail (S.A.)	1977–80	M
Arnold Shore	1897–1963	The Argus	1949–1957	M
Arnold Shore	1897–1963	The Age	1957–1963	M
Mervyn Skipper	1886–1959	The Bulletin	1930–31 / 1956–59	M
Mervyn Skipper	1886–1959	The Lone Hand		M
Jeffrey Smart	1921–	Daily Telegraph	1952–54	M
Sebastian Smee	1972–	The Australian	c.2004–2008	M
Bernard Smith	1916–2011	The Age	1963–1966	M
Ernest Walter Smith	1928	Sunday Mail (S.A.)	1963	M
James Smith	1820–1910	The Age	1854–56	M
James Smith	1820–1910	The Argus	1856–63 1868–96	M
Bertram Stevens	1872–1922	The Bulletin	1909–10	M
Bertram Stevens	1872–1922	The Lone Hand	1912–18	M
Arthur Streeton	1867–1943	The Argus	1929–1935	M
Agnes Sweetapple	1899–1987	The Sydney Morning Herald	1950s–?	F
Daniel Thomas	1931	Sunday Telegraph	1962–66 1968–69	M
Daniel Thomas	1931	The Sydney Morning Herald	1970–75	M
Daniel Thomas	1931	The Bulletin	1976–77	M
Laurence Nicholas Barrett (Laurie) Thomas	1915–1974	Herald (Melbourne)	1949–50	M
Laurence Nicholas Barrett (Laurie) Thomas	1915–1974	The Australian	1968–73	M
Gerald Marr Thompson	1856–1938	Daily Telegraph	c.1883–86	M
Wallace Thornton	1915–1991	The Sydney Morning Herald	1957–67	M
Evelyn Mary Tildesley	1882–1976	Australian Women's Weekly	1923–35	F
Peter Timms	1948	The Age	1991>	M
Peter Timms	1948	The Australian	1990s	M
Clive Turnbull	1906–1975	Herald (Melbourne)	1943–48	M
Francesco Cesare Luigi Stefano Vanzetti	1878–1967	West Australian	c.1929...c.1952?	M
Hayward Veal	1913–1968	Daily News (Sydney)	1937–c.1951?	M
Wendy Walker	1946–	The Australian	2006–2016	F
Wendy Walker	1946–	The Advertiser	1999–2006	F
Peter Ward		The Australian	1976–2002	M
Alan Warren	1919–1991	The Sun News-Pictorial	1951–72	M
Elizabeth Webb		The Courier-Mail	1940s–1950s	F
Penny Webb	1963	The Age	1990s–2010s	F
Neville Weston	1936–2017	The Advertiser (Adelaide)	1980s	M
James Wieneke	1906–1981	Brisbane Telegraph	1949–50	M
Leslie Wilkie	1879–1935	The Age	briefly	M
Laetitia Wilson		The West Australian	2012–2017	F
Anne-Marie Willis		Nation Review	c.1977	F
Rex Thomas Percy Reginald Wood	1908–1970	?	?	M
Elizabeth Young		The Advertiser	1952–74	F
Blamire Young	1862–1935	Herald (Melbourne)	1929–34	M
