= Memory Holloway =

American born art historian and critic active in Australia 1972–1989

Memory Jockish Holloway (b. 13 August 1946) is an American-born art historian, lecturer, art curator and critic and humanitarian who began her career in Australia in the 1970s, working and living there for twenty years before returning to America to the University of Massachusetts.

== Training ==
Holloway, born in Pennsylvania, studied in the cities of Berlin and Paris and spent 20 years in Australia, before moving to South Dartmouth, MA., and received an MA Certificate from Harvard, and an MA and Ph.D at the Courtauld Institute of Art 1995

== Australia ==
=== Art critic ===
Holloway was active from 1970 in Australia, was the art critic for newspapers The Melbourne Times 1977–78, The Australian 1978–81, The Age 1972–86, a contributor from 1982–88 to its Monthly Review supplement, and occasional contributor to The Herald. She wrote for Art + Australia 1980–1988. The Ewing and George Paton Gallery published her in its catalogues, and in 1976 its collective, including Holloway with Kiffy Carter, Gary Catalano, Lynne Cooke, Suzanne Davies, Ann Galbally, G.R. (Ross) Lansell, Charles Merewether, Bruce Pollard, Meredith Rogers and Ann Stephen began publication of Arts Melbourne a quarterly magazine, building on the success of Art Almanac, founded by the directors in 1974. Andrew Montana in Primitive & Pop: Keith Haring's Australia (Australian Scholarly Publishing 1984), notes that in Holloway's opinion Keith Haring's work was "sanitised graffiti" made "with his eyes glued to the art market.”

=== Style ===
Holloway applied art-historical scholarship in her journalism without diluting it into cultural reportage or aesthetic opinion. She thus contributed to a strand of Australian criticism for which contemporary art was an intellectual product. When Denise Green, after successes in the USA, exhibited at Tolarno Galleries in Melbourne, The Age in August 1982 published two articles side-by-side: one a review of the show by Holloway, the other an interview with the artist by Philippa Hawker. Holloway's reaction to this savvy modernist is distinctly art-historical and theoretically informed, intellectually more aligned to writings of her near contemporary Terry Smith than to Daniel Thomas or Robert Hughes, a decade older than she, while remaining distinct from all three. By 1982, Holloway was well established in Australia not as a journalistic commentator but as a critic using close formal analysis, and historical context, being fluent in postwar European and American art discourse. Unlike Hughes' more polemical judgements, Holloway's eschews rhetoric for quiet authority grounded in method. While Daniel Thomas' writing for newspapers and galleries supported a connoisseur's interest with lucid exposition, Holloway, assuming her reader is critically literate and capable of following semiotic, structural, and modernist arguments without translation, is neither courting nor didactic. She is thus closest to Terry Smith’s contemporaneous insistence on the intellectual seriousness of art criticism, requiring attention to structure, temporality, and contexts of meaning in modern and postmodern art, though she is less theoretical, meta-critical or programmatic than Smith. Holloway attends to the internal logic of artworks within inherited modernist problems. It is evident that editor Peter Ellingsen felt obliged to include the Hawker interview being conscious of how Holloway, in her review, refuses biography or intention as the primary explanation of Green's work, preferring to read her painting as a system of signs shaped by historical precedent and conceptual constraint.

=== Reception ===
Nevertheless, where it illuminates their work, Holloway does not avoid direct discourse with artists like Philip Guston in her articles, or in her July 1985 discussion with Bill Henson on his work, in which she concludes prophetically (given the later controversy) that: "Henson ventures into territory that has, until now, remained private, forbidden. That is why his photographs make us uncomfortable. Because we are intruders." Nor does Holloway avoid controversial judgements. Jenny Zimmer, in reaction to Holloway's review in The Age of Andrew Sibley show at Realities Gallery considers, in her discussion of his Circus series, that Holloway was "off the mark" in wanting "to limit the meaning of the pictures to a commentary on the alienation of the artist from society and his struggle for recognition, and to retain his individuality against the opposition of the masses" and in describing the paintings as "an index to the artist's most private fears and obsessions", the circus theme being judged to mean "artist as outsider". In her rejoinder, Zimmer merely asserts that "No profound artist could limit his description of the tragi-comic, ugly-beautiful world of the circus to his own concerns."

In July of 1982, when it was shown simultaneously with Popism and The Artist and the Printer at the NGV, Holloway takes George Paton Gallery curator Judy Annear to task over Art in the Age of Mechanical Reproduction: "the more I looked at the work, the more I thought Benjamin had been misrepresented, mainly because many of these artists were making authentic original works that have an aura, and presence; qualities avoided by Benjamin's criteria" and accusing Annear of "jumping on the linguistic bandwagon of post-structuralism and semiotic theory." Conversely, while Holloway praises her colleague on The Age, Gary Catalano, as "the only writer who has fully realised the importance of light for the artist in his essay, 'The Incandescent World'", for the catalogue for Peter Booth's show at the Melbourne University Gallery, Catalano finds the curatorial thread too tenuous in her selections for Shipwrecked at 200 Gertrude Street. John McDonald however highlights the value of her article in Art Network on American Dennis Oppenheim.

Pat Hoffie, writing in Artlink remarks that "During the 1980s', both Memory Holloway and Paul Taylor described self-critical ambivalence as a typical characteristic of Australia's cultural identity. Holloway defined this tendency as 'skepticism'."

Holloway’s 1982 review in Art + Australia of Richard Haese’s Rebels and Precursors like many reviewers', affirms the book’s scholarly importance, and echoes Bernard Smith’s endorsement of Haese’s clarity of writing. "The intensity of political awareness in the 1930s and 1940s" she frames as a foreground concern of the author, not a detached ideological backdrop, by which artists of the period understood themselves as public intellectuals beyond disciplinary boundaries. While other reviewers concentrate on his narrative of the emergence of Australian modernism, Holloway notes how these painters were "not content to be regarded simply as creators of beautiful objects, and removed from the concerns of the real world. If art were a reflection of society then it should encompass and reflect the events that happen in society", quoting Haese: "it was a time when artists refused to see themselves or be seen by their literary friends as painters in a narrow sense. They could be and were both poets and painters, social critics and aestheticians, ideologues and craftsmen, literary editors and art activists — the old categories were irrelevant." From her broader interest in how cultural institutions regulate meaning and legitimacy, Holloway underscores Haese’s account of conservative resistance—especially of the Australian Academy of Art, state galleries, and figures such as Menzies, Daryl Lindsay, and J. S. MacDonald—not simply as aesthetic opposition to modernism but as political suppression of deeper ideological struggles within Australian society. Holloway highlights the role Haese discovers of patrons, writers, and critics—John and Sunday Reed, Max Harris, Basil Burdett, Adrian Lawlor—supporting "a vital and exciting intellectual dialogue, which", she writes "unfortunately, no longer exists", praising Haese’s book as a corrective to contemporary cultural amnesia. Holloway is unusually explicit in valuing Haese’s partiality, aligning it with a Baudelairean model of criticism that is committed, evaluative, and historically situated. In doing so, she distinguishes herself from more detached academic reviewers Charles Merewether (in National Times, 1981), and Jill Graham (in Art & Text, 1982).

=== American art ===
Drawing on her visits there, and her contacts and origins in, America, Holloway continued in the late 1980s to provide The Age with distinctive reviews such as that for the Paul Klee retrospective at the Museum of Modern Art:

In 'Outbreak of Fear', done in 1939, Klee confirmed the mood which predominated in his mind. It shows a figure cut into bits and flattened out on the page, as though one of the artist's puppets had come apart at the seams. The figure is trapped in an airless space. Paradoxically, these final works are bolder, more confident, broader, than anything Klee had done before. They are proof of the artist's anguish, of his inability to alter the historical events of the time, but they also demonstrate the belief in the power of art to regenerate at a time when destruction was so close at hand.

Jeffrey Makin, reviewing the NGV's late 1983 Vox Pop for Art + Australia, and objecting to its slavish following of American trends finds himself echoing Holloway's comment that the exhibition "joined the long camel train of shows of this sort which have appeared in Europe and Britain... at the tail end," and agreeing with her opinion that Paul Boston's work was the most original in it.

Writing in 1987, Holloway contrasts the scale and intensity of the New York art world with the more modest, publicly-sponsored Australian scene, portraying American art culture as highly competitive and market-driven, where recognition—particularly through the Whitney Biennial—can rapidly transform an artist’s career and lifestyle, unlike the incremental gains typical in Australia. She presents the Whitney as both a powerful institutional arbiter and a focus of ritualised criticism, comparable in role, if not magnitude, to the Sydney Biennale. She also identifies a stylistic shift away from neo-expressionism toward cool, technologically inflected abstraction, photography, and 'simulationist' (appropriative) practices concerned with media, appearance, and consumption. Referring to the political climate of Reagan-era America, her Age article concludes that aesthetic values, institutional power, and market forces shape contemporary art in ways largely unavailable within the Australian context.

Through Gertrude Street, and in her frequent reviews, Holloway encouraged emerging art, Jan Murray's Berlin series for example, and championed that which 'throbb[ed] with energy and activity' from Roar Studios.

== Academic ==
Employed from the early 70s as its first lecturer in the Department of Visual Arts, Monash University, Melbourne, in 1983 Holloway is described as "lecturer in art and architecture of the twentieth-century". Ian McLean who studied at Monash University with fellow student Paul Taylor remembered: the…American lecturer, Memory Holloway, and Patrick McCaughey, drew you into the world of ideas. It created a lively atmosphere of true believers in contemporary art, and for Tim Abdallah who became a partner in Gerstman Abdallah Fine Arts International and subsequently administered their new gallery in Cologne, "It was an inspiring course and it fired up my interest in Italian Rennaissance art."

Of McCaughey, when he was director of the National Gallery of Victoria, Holloway praised his success: "You have to go back to English traditions, to Kenneth Clark or Roger Fry, to see how well Patrick combines connoisseurship and criticism. He's not a great art historian, but he is a great populariser of art and he's brought the gallery to life again."

Visiting British artist John Walker got to know their mutual friend and Holloway's professional colleague, McCaughey, when he and Walker were Harkness fellows in New York in the early 1970s. McCaughey became the first professor of Fine Arts at Monash University in 1972 (with its first intake being in 1975), and in 1979 he offered Walker a residency at the university. There, the artist and Holloway met, married, and by 1985 had had two children. One of Walker’s lasting legacies was setting up Gertrude Contemporary, then known as 200 Gertrude Street, in 1985, the combined studio and gallery complex in Fitzroy, and a first in Australia. After its establishment he handed management to others including his then-wife, Holloway, who was its co-chair 1985—1987. Holloway reviewed Walker's exhibition at the Tate in 1985.

=== Promotion of Australian art ===
Michael Davie writing in The Age notes the efforts by the couple to promote Australian art internationally, particularly in New York:

Both he and Memory Holloway have been active recently in the push to put contemporary Australian art on the map - or at least on a corner of the map - in New York. A year ago, New York, which is not inclined to underrate itself as the world centre of modern art, had scarcely heard of Australian painting. During the past 12 months, however, the Museum of Modern Art has for the first time included Australian artists in a big survey, and the Guggenheim Museum has staged a series of international shows of which the Australian one, according to Walker, was the most important. Memory Holloway wrote the catalogue and five of the eight artists on show were graduates of the Victoria College of the Arts.

Notably in 1984, Memory Holloway selected Howard Arkley, Sydney Ball, Peter Booth, Arthur Boyd, Richard Dunn, Philip Hunter, Roger Kemp, Mary MacQueen, Jeffrey Makin, Jan Murray, John Olsen, Steig Persson, Jan Senbergs, Tony Tuckson, Ken Whisson, and Fred Williams. for inclusion in her The Australians: three generations of drawings at C.D.S. Gallery in New York City. In her essay for the 1984 Exxon international exhibition Australian visions at the Guggenheim, Holloway, against curator Diane Waldman’s assertion of an ‘authentic’ Australia, argues that:

“There is no one Australia. It is more accurate to view this place, its culture and its art, as Meaghan Morris has recently characterized it, as ‘a compilation culture of borrowed fragments, stray reproductions and alien(ated) memories ...what we have to begin with.' And to go from there. Sticking bits together, improvising, making do...”

Amongst several public presentations, Holloway spoke at the National Gallery of Victoria in 1975 on Dutch Landscape in the European gallery, and the Romantic movement, was a selector for the Diamond Valley art awards, judged the Andor Mezaros Prize, spoke on 'Beauty and the Beast: Art in Vienna at the Turn of the Century' at the Council of Adult Education one-day seminar 'The Austrian Identity', delivered a widely advertised lecture on Marc Chagall at the “Kadimah” Jewish Cultural Centre in Elsternwick in August 1985, regularly joined Artsview for discussion of 1985 art on ABC radio, and a forum Pop Art 1955–1970 at George Paton Gallery. In letters to newspapers she noted the value of Melbourne's Victoria Market still selling fruit and vegetables when "London and Paris have mournfully lost Covent Garden and Les Halles." In October 1985, on behalf of the Australian government, Holloway attended the 18th São Paolo Biennial where painter Dick Watkins represented his country, and she reviewed it for Art + Australia.

=== Postmodernism ===
Holloway's position on postmodernism is prefaced in her July 1982 review of Lynne Eastaway at Axiom gallery, back-to back with mention of John Nixon's Art Projects and his showing at Documenta with Imants Tillers:

Post-modernist painting: is there such a thing? Well yes, but nobody seems to agree on exactly what it is. If it has something to do with emotion and thickly encrusted surfaces, it may be called neo-expressionism. Or if there are figures it might be called New Imagism. If its inspiration is taken from popular culture but it is detached and deadpan, then New Wave might do. Or Naive Nouveau or New Subiectivity or International National. Even Energism is being batted around as a new style. When the question was asked last April at the Sydney Biennale, no single definition could be agreed upon. But whatever we decide to call it, painting has changed during the past few years. There's been a shift of emphasis from the flat abstraction of modernism to a more personal emotive statement. Heavily worked surfaces are back in much of the new painting.

But it is elucidated in the introduction to a 1988 text on the subject, jointly written by its editors Andrew Milner, Philip J. Thomson, and Chris Worth, then of the Centre for General and Comparative Literature at Monash:

Feminist politics are similarly central for [compatriot Rita] Felski and Holloway, for both of whom postmodernism is neither a style nor a form, but rather a site of conflict where incorporative but also adversarial cultural modes are at work. For both, oppositional cultural politics are feminist, although they differ as to the extent to which such politics are necessarily embedded in alternative cultural forms. Felski, in an argument which might prove a suitable epilogue for earlier debates within Marxism as much as a contribution to those within contemporary feminism, insists on the relative political neutrality of form in the postmodern epoch, and argues for the strategic priority over art of a feminist politics — but one which will require no normative political aesthetic. Holloway does insist on the politically and culturally radical properties of particular postmodern artistic practices, but these remain, not coincidentally, the practices of an engaged feminist art.

== Later career ==
Dr. Memory Holloway was a faculty member for The New Bedford Clemente Course in the Humanities which began in 2005, with help from Humanities at the University of Massachusetts-Dartmouth, where she was teaching, and PACE, Inc. with credits granted by UMass-Dartmouth.

Holloway became a member of Grace Episcopal Church in New Bedford and was on the board of the Salvation Army. She studied at the Episcopal Divinity School (when it was in Cambridge), which she said, “clarified what I believed in. It was the ethical beliefs and ethical teachings, the art of living.” She acted as a translator for Guatemalans as they dealt with legal aid in the aftermath of the 2007 Michael Bianco immigration raid.

Expanding the scope on the scholarship of images of food depicted in film, Holloway, in her essay 'Taste, Honor, and Tradition in Il Mafioso' turns to Italian mafia stories and Italian regional culture in 1962 Il Mafioso a North versus South narrative of mid-century Italian masculinity, nationality, and family loyalty: "Il Mafioso is about more than the Mafia. It is a dark comedy that pits the image of northern industrialized Italy and precision against the south in which ancient customs are expressed by wary peasants who fear and accept Mafia threats. At the very heart of the contrast between north and south, is food: its appearance, its strange ingredients, its acceptance and rejection by those at the table."

In March 2017 Holloway presented a paper 'Helen Watson Phelps: Out of the Shadows and into the Light' at The Making Her Mark Symposium at the historic First Baptist Church, Providence, sponsored by the Providence Art Club and in association with the University of Massachusetts Dartmouth Art History Department.

In 2021 Holloway collaborated with UMass Dartmouth Librarian Archivist Sonia Pacheco on a $17,600 demographics project to interview Cape Verdean-Americans immigrants about their lives in Massachusetts. As of 2025, Holloway, aged seventy-nine, was emeritus professor of art history at University of Massachusetts Dartmouth, and served on the board of the Center for Portuguese Studies and Culture.

== Selected curatorship ==
When in 1989 James Mollison was selected for the directorship the National Gallery of Victoria, it was rumoured that the gallery trustees had been favouring Memory Holloway, one of six interviewed, for the position, she having curated a number of shows and produced significant catalogues for the institution. Holloway and husband John Walker were by then living in New York. Earlier, in 1986, Holloway had detailed Mollison's persistent negotiations with Lee Krasner for the eventual purchase of Totem Lesson II, and important drawings, by Jackson Pollock, for the Australian National Gallery.

- 1981, 26 February–2 August: Max Klinger: love, death and the beyond; Touring National Gallery of Victoria, Melbourne (26 February–12 April 1981), Art Gallery of South Australia, Adelaide (2 May–7 June), Art Gallery of New South Wales, Sydney (4 July–2 August)
- 1983: George Baldessin: sculpture and etchings; a memorial exhibition. National Gallery of Victoria. Melbourne.
- 1984, 24 September - 20 October: The Australians: three generations of drawings with Howard Arkley, Sydney Ball, Peter Booth, Arthur Boyd, Richard Dunn, Philip Hunter, Roger Kemp, Mary MacQueen, Jeffrey Makin, Jan Murray, John Olsen, Steig Persson, Jan Senbergs, Tony Tuckson, Ken Whisson, Fred Williams. CDS Gallery, New York, curated by Memory Holloway
- 1986, 26 November–20 December: Shipwrecked. Micky Allan, Lynne Boyd, Brian Dunlop, Chris Dyson, Merrin Eirth, Andrew Gorsuch, Anton Hassell, Katherine Hattam, Geoff Lowe, Alina McDonald, Victor Majzner, Jan Murray, Jan Nelson, Ian Parry. 20 Gertrude Street.
- 1987, 10 September–17 October: Micky Allan: Perspective 1975–1987. Monash University Gallery, Clayton
- 1988: John Walker: drawings from the Forge Series, Madeleine Carter Fine Art, Brookline, Mass.
- 1990, 6 April–14 June: Mandy Martin, Latrobe Valley Arts Centre, Morwell (6 April–6 May 1990), and Christine Abrahams Gallery (21 May–14 June 1990)
- 1999, 26 January–27 February: Paula Rego Children’s Crusade, Marlborough Graphics, London
- 1999, 28 November – 24 December: Paula Rego Children’s Crusade, Edinburgh Printmakers Workshop
- 1999, 18 September–20 December: Open Secrets–Drawings and Etchings by Paula Rego, University Art Gallery, University of Massachusetts, Dartmouth, US, 18 September – 23 October; Centre Culturel Calouste Gulbenkian, Paris, 16 November – 20 December, curated by Memory Holloway; text by Memory Holloway and Ruth Rosengarten
- 2017, 11 February–31 March; Women, Art and Fibers: Contemporary Responses to Abolition and Journey North, CVPA Campus Gallery at the University of Massachusetts Dartmouth

== Awards ==
UMass President’s Public Service Award on the 10th anniversary of the faculty award for providing exemplary public service to the state.

== Selected publications ==
- Source Bookshop (Melbourne); Holloway, Memory Jockisch, 1946-; Morton, Alex; Smith, Paul (1971). Source review. Source.
- Buchanan, Glenn; Holloway, Memory Jockisch; Humphries, Ian (1974). Antique rugs of the Caucasus. Melbourne: Australian Society for Antique Rugs. OCLC 190822071.
- Holloway, Memory Jockisch; Doolin, James (1978). James Doolin: artist in residence, the Victorian College of the Arts. Victorian College of the Arts. School of Art.
- Memory Holloway, The many faces of woman’, The Australian, 6 June 1978
- Holloway, Memory Jockish (January 1979). "Vordemberge-Gildewart and Hanover Constructivism". Art Bulletin of Victoria: 11. OCLC 7128572853.
- Holloway, Memory Jockisch; Klinger, Max; Zdanowicz, Irena (1981). Max Klinger : love, death, and the beyond. National Gallery of Victoria. ISBN 978-0-7241-0077-4.
- Holloway, Memory (1981). "Reel Women: Narrative as a Feminist Alternative". Art & Text. 3.
- Holloway, Memory Jockisch; Roslyn Oxley9 Gallery (May 1982). New painting (13 May - 5 June 1982). Roslyn Oxley9.
- Memory Holloway: 'Popism', Art Network No.7, Spring 1982
- Holloway, Memory (1982). "Eroticism, myth and the bullfight: Picasso's Femme Torero I and Corrida". NGV Art Journal.
- Memory Holloway: 'Closing the gaps: recent art in Melbourne', Studio International, Vol.196, No.1002, 1983
- Lindsay, Robert; Holloway, Memory Jockisch; Baldessin, George (1983). George Baldessin, sculpture and etchings : a memorial exhibition. National Gallery of Victoria. ISBN 978-0-7241-0099-6.
- Holloway, Memory (1983). "Mark Rothko's Untitled (Red): Colour and the Experience of the Sublime". Art Bulletin of Victoria. 23: 13–18.
- Holloway, Memory (1984). "Minimal Art". In Taylor, Paul (ed.). Anything goes: art in Australia, 1970-1980. South Yarra, Vic: Art & Text. ISBN 978-0-9591042-0-2.
- Holloway, Memory Jockisch (1984). The Australians : three generations of drawings. New York: CDS Gallery. ISBN 978-0-912877-04-4.
- Holloway, Memory (1984). "Picasso and women: painting as if to possess". In McCaughey, Patrick (ed.). Picasso: [exhibition] National Gallery of Victoria, 28.7.84 - 23.9.84 ; Art Gallery of New South Wales, 10.10.84 - 2.12.84. Melbourne: Internat. Cultural Corporation of Australia. ISBN 978-0-642-87097-1.
- Holloway, Memory Jockisch; 200 Gertrude Street (Gallery) (1986). Shipwrecked : an exhibition of paintings, prints, drawings, sculpture, Wednesday November 26–Saturday December 20, 1986. Deans Art.
- Holloway, Memory (1986). Triad : Mandy Martin, Jan Murray, Susan Rankine. Adelaide, S. Aust.: Royal South Australian Society of Arts Gallery.
- Holloway, Memory; Duncan, Jenepher (1987). Micky Allan, perspective 1975-1987. Clayton, Vic.: Monash University Gallery. ISBN 9780867467826.
- Holloway, Memory Jockisch (1990). Schizophrenics, Tibet-heads and Harvard: the American response. Vol. 30 (Special Supplement ed.). Art Monthly Australia. pp. 24–27.
- Holloway, Memory Jockisch (1990). Mandy Martin: Latrobe Valley Series. Latrobe Valley Arts Centre.
- Holloway, Memory Jockish (1991). Holloway, Memory (ed.). Picasso in the collections of the National Gallery of Victoria. Melbourne, Vic: The Gallery. ISBN 978-0-7241-0149-8.
- Holloway, Memory Jockisch; Rosengarten, Ruth; Rego, Paula; Centro cultural Calouste Gulbenkian (1999). Open secrets : drawings and etchings by Paula Rego. University Art Gallery, University of Massachusetts Dartmouth. ISBN 978-0-9666437-2-5.
- Holloway, Memory (2004). "Dining with Panthers". Portuguese Studies. 20 (1): 208–211. doi:10.1353/port.2004.0012. ISSN 2222-4270.
- Holloway, Memory Jockisch; Picasso, Pablo (2006). Making time: Picasso's Suite 347. Peter Lang. ISBN 978-0-8204-5046-9.
- Holloway, Memory (2008). "Making Waves: Cape Verdeans, Whaling and the Uses of Photography". In Batalha, Luis; Carling, Jørgen (eds.). Transnational Archipelago: Perspectives on Cape Verdean Migration and Diaspora. Routledge. pp. 113–30. doi:10.5117/9789053569948. ISBN 9789053569948.
- Holloway, Memory (2011). "Review: Annemarie Jordan Gschwend. The Story of Süleyman: Celebrity Elephants and Other Exotica in Renaissance Portugal. Philadelphia: Pachyderm, 2010. vii + 80 pp. append. illus. bibl. ISBN: 978–1–61658–821–2". Renaissance Quarterly. 64 (2): 609–610. doi:10.1086/661840. ISSN 0034-4338.
- Helen Watson Phelps: Out of the Shadows and into the Light. The Making Her Mark Symposium, Providence Art Club, March 25, 2017, The Historic First Baptist Church Providence, RI https://providenceartclub.org/symposium/
- Larkosh, Christopher; Pereira, Mário; Holloway, Memory; University of Massachusetts Dartmouth, eds. (2018). Transnational Africas: visual, material and sonic cultures of lusophone Africa. Portuguese literary and cultural studies. Dartmouth, Massachusetts: Tagus Press/University of Massachusetts Dartmouth. ISBN 978-1-933227-82-5.
- Contributor: Cook, Bernard A; Taylor & Francis (2001). Europe since 1945 : an encyclopedia. Garland. ISBN 978-0-8153-4057-7.
- Holloway, Memory Jockisch; Picasso, Pablo, 1881-1973 (2006). Making time : Picasso's Suite 347. Peter Lang. ISBN 978-0-8204-5046-9.
- Memory Holloway, “Art Journals, Progeny of the 1970s” in Leon Paroissien (ed), Australian Art Review, Warner Associates, Rozelle, 1982, p.14
- Holloway, Memory (2000). "Rhinocéros sans corne: Paula Rego et l'antitradition de l'autoportrait" [Rhinoceros without a horn: Paula Rego and the anti-tradition of the self-portrait]. Arquivos do Centro Cultural Calouste Gulbenkian (in French). 39: 305–313. ISSN 0590-966X.
- Holloway, Memory (Fall 2000). "Praying in the Sand: Paula Rego and Visual Representations of the First Mass in Brazil". Portuguese Literary and Cultural Studies: 697–705.
- Holloway, Memory (2011). "Review: Annemarie Jordan Gschwend. The Story of Süleyman: Celebrity Elephants and Other Exotica in Renaissance Portugal. Philadelphia: Pachyderm, 2010. vii + 80 pp. append. illus. bibl. ISBN: 978–1–61658–821–2". Renaissance Quarterly. 64 (2): 609–610. doi:10.1086/661840. ISSN 0034-4338.
- Fernando Arenas - Portuguese Literary and Cultural Studies, University of Massachusetts Dartmouth (May 29, 2018). Christopher Larkosh; Mario Perreira; Memory Holloway (eds.). "The Filmography of Guinea-Bissau's Sana Na N'Hada: From the Return of Amílcar Cabral to the Threat of Global Drug Trafficking". Transnational Africa: 68–94. doi:10.62791/va3ttz37.
- Holloway, Memory (2014). "Salazar's Boots". In Owen, Hilary; Klobucka, Anna (eds.). Gender, empire, and postcolony: Luso-Afro-Brazilian intersections. New York, New York: Palgrave Macmillan. ISBN 978-1-137-34341-3.

=== Selected reviews ===
- Memory Holloway, Art: Assault on the eyes with changing hues, The Age, 18 October 1972, p.2
- ______________, Review: 'Popism', Art Network, #7, 1982
- ______________, ‘The remarkable Inge King’, The Age, 22 September 1982, p. 14
- ______________, Review of Godwin Bradbeer The Age. ‘Art’, 16 Nov 1983
- ______________, ‘The School of Cool’, The Age, 3 August 1983, p. 14
- ______________, ‘Closing the gaps: recent art in Melbourne’, Studio International, Vol 196, No 1002, London, 1983
- ______________, ‘A welcome record for landscapes’, The Age, 22 March 1984
- ______________, ‘A Powerful View Across the Berlin Wall’, The Age, 29 June 1985
