= Arthur McIntyre (artist) =

- Born: 31 October 1945; Katoomba, New South Wales, Australia
- Died: 26 October 2003 (aged 57)
- Education: National Art School, Sydney; Cité internationale des arts in Paris
- Known for: artist and art critic

Arthur McIntyre (31 October 1945 – 26 October 2003) was an Australian artist and art critic. He was born in Katoomba, New South Wales.

== Early life and training ==
McIntyre's early inspiration as an artist was the popular Australian Broadcasting Corporation radio program Argonauts Club. As member "Atropos 30" McIntyre would send in his drawings to the Argonauts program on a regular basis and the program's art critic Jeffrey Smart would be an ongoing source of encouragement. He was awarded the Australian Broadcasting Corporation's Commonwealth Art Award by Jeffrey Smart in 1962 during his final year at Katoomba High School. After earning the Dux of Katoomba High School that same year, McIntyre was offered two university scholarships and chose to study at the Alexander Mackie Teachers College, now known as Sydney's National Art School (1963 to 1966).

== Teacher ==
After college, McIntyre taught art in several high schools in Sydney and Canberra before becoming a full-time artist, supplementing his income writing art criticism from 1975. That same year he was awarded a studio at the Cité internationale des arts in Paris.

== Art writer ==
McIntyre was an art critic for The Australian from 1977 to 1978, was the Sydney art critic for The Age throughout the 1980s and a regular contributor to the journal Art & Australia from 1975 to 1990. He published two seminal books: "Resurgence and Redefinition: Australian Contemporary Drawing" (Boolarong Publishers, Queensland, 1988) and "Contemporary Australian Collage and its Origins" (Craftsman House, New South Wales, 1990).

== Style and reception ==
As an artist he primarily worked in the media of collage, drawing and painting. Many of his works were controversial for their sexual content, often utilizing collage elements sourced from pornographic magazines. In 1987 the artist Jan Senbergs awarded McIntyre the acquisitive Gold Coast City Art Gallery Prize for one such painting/collage called "Flesh and Blood" (1987). A less controversial, autobiographical drawing about growing up in the Blue Mountains was awarded the acquisitive Kedumba Art Award by artist James Gleeson in 1992. McIntyre's work is held in many other public collections including most Australian State gallery collections, such as the Art Gallery of New South Wales, the National Gallery of Victoria, the Art Gallery of Western Australia and the National Gallery of Australia, who has more than 100 of his works. In 1994 Ted Gott curated McIntyre into the groundbreaking group exhibition "Don't Leave Me This Way: Art in the Age of AIDS" at the National Gallery of Australia.

== Legacy ==
Five years after McIntyre's death, curator Daniel Mudie Cunningham revived McIntyre's work by including him in the group exhibition "Bent Western" at Blacktown Arts Centre (2008) and subsequently writing journal articles about McIntyre in Art Monthly Australia and Art and Australia. In May 2010, Cunningham curated a two-part retrospective called "Arthur McIntyre: Bad Blood 1960–2000", which was held at Hazelhurst Regional Gallery and Arts Centre and Macquarie University Art Gallery simultaneously. A comprehensive publication was published by Hazelhurst and Macquarie University for this exhibition and featured a detailed essay by Cunningham about McIntyre's life and work, along with an extensive bibliography of McIntyre's writings.
