= Art + Australia =

Australian art magazine published since 1963

- Editor-in-chief: Su Baker
- Editor: Jeremy Eaton
- Categories: Art
- Frequency: Biannual
- Founder: Mervyn Horton
- Founded: 1963
- Company: Victorian College of Arts
- Country: Australia
- Based in: Southbank, Victoria
- Language: English
- Website: artandaustralia.com
- ISSN: 0004-301X
- OCLC: 60628388

Art + Australia is a biannual magazine, and the country's longest-running art journal. It succeeded Art in Australia in 1963 as Art and Australia, and changed from Art & Australia to its current name in 2015. In August 2022 the magazine became a digital-only publication.

== History ==
=== 1960s ===
The magazine was first published by Sam Ure Smith in May 1963 as Art and Australia. It followed Sam's father Sydney Ure Smith's publication Art in Australia, which was in print from 1916 until 1942, when war restrictions caused its demise. Ian Burn has noted that between the cessation of Art in Australia in 1942, and 1963 when Art and Australia commenced publication, no regular art periodicals circulated nationally, except for the Contemporary Art Society's broadsheet and that an "art boom" in the 1960s presented "an opportune time" to launch Art and Australia. Its second issue was hailed by the Canberra Times:

Art and Australia is a handsomely produced work containing a collection of articles on Leonard French, Margaret Preston and West coast United States painting, together with a piece on Australian architecture, another on British sculpture, and some editorial comment.

Humphrey McQueen identifies Art and Australia as one of the first glossies to exploit advances in offset colour printing on quality stock in Australia. However, Donald Brook, taking issue with the "too expensive" 1964 cover price concludes that:

It is not, in general, a slick magazine, but one which seems ready to deal straightforwardly with anything interesting and admirable in Australian art, and to set it (if rather tentatively) in an international context. It is extremely well produced, neither chi-chi nor stuffy, but attractive to handle and to look at. It has book reviews of decent length, in which there is room for useful discussion.

=== 1970s–1980s ===
From 1963 to 1983, Mervyn Horton was the magazine's founding editor when it faced competition from of Artlink in Adelaide and Art & Text in Melbourne, both in 1981, and Praxis X in Perth, in 1983. International artists visiting and exhibiting in Australia were given coverage in such articles as Daniel Thomas's consideration of performance art in 'Moorman and Paik in Australia' in the September 1976 issue, while attention was paid to Australian artists' activities overseas, as when Ian Burn, in ‘Conceptual Art as Art’, published in Art and Australia in September 1970, examined another avant-garde movement through the example of Robert Jacks.

=== 1990s ===
After Horton's death in 1983 Elwyn Lynn became editor, followed by Jennifer Phipps and Leon Paroissien, Dinah Dysart, Hannah Fink and Laura Murray Cree. As Anderson notes, under Dysart's editorship the winter issue of 1993 examined contributions to Australian art made by European émigrés as artists and architects, art historians and dealers. In 1993, Art and Australia included ART and AsiaPacific as a supplement, then as a stand-alone quarterly publication from November 1993. That year, Sam Ure Smith, then 71, sold the magazine and his company, Fine Arts Press to Switzerland-based American publisher Martin Gordon (1933–2015) founder of Gordon and Breach, who also secured art book publisher Craftsman House for A$570,000, equivalent to A$2.05 million in 2022, also 21C: The Magazine of Culture, Technology And Science, and started Art AsiaPacific, before illness and financial problems necessitated his selling both companies, for a nominal sum, to associate Rhonda Fitzsimmons who after divesting of liabilities retained Art & Australia for its advertising revenue.

=== 2000s ===
In 2003, Parson's School-trained artist and art collector Latvian-born Eleonora Triguboff, wife of investment manager Michael Triguboff (nephew of property developer Harry Triguboff), became owner, editor and publisher. Proclaiming that "as a sculptor I always wanted to be involved in a magazine," her ambition was to increase circulation of the magazine beyond its then 10,000. Her purchase of the most lucrative asset of Fine Art Publishing meant the sale of the less profitable Art AsiaPacific to Chinese businessman-artist, Xhao Gang in New York, and of the 21-year-old book publishing arm Craftsman House, to Thames & Hudson.

Since 2006, winners of the Art & Australia/ANZ Bank (later Credit Suisse) Private Banking Contemporary Art Award – awarded to Australian and New Zealand emerging artists – have appeared on the magazine's back cover (see § Selected cover artists). In 2008, the magazine, with Dott Publishing in Paddington, New South Wales, released the survey Current: contemporary art from Australia and New Zealand.

In August 2013, the print magazine celebrated fifty years, was rebadged as ARTAND Australia, and the 201st issue – volume 51, number 1 in August 2013 – featured a redesign by Melbourne-based design firm Fabio Ongarato Design. In 2014, ARTAND Australia migrated the magazine to a fully online presence to focus on art book publication with Dott Publishing, its imprint. In 2015, Triguboff donated Art & Australia, rebadged Art + Australia, to the Victorian College of Arts, before it was relaunched in October 2020. In the period between 2015 and 2021, Art + Australia published biannual, thematic issues that charted the geopolitical conditions of contemporary artistic practice.

In 2022, Art + Australia became a digital-only publication, with discussions, criticism and reflections on contemporary artistic practice from Australia and abroad, releasing contributions by Peta Clancy, Jahkarli Romanis and Kirsten Garner Lyttle, Lisa Liebetrau, Thomas Moran, Loqui Paatsch, Aimee Dodds and Tim Burns, Bronwyn Bailey-Charteris, Caitlin Hughes, Jacqui Shelton and Roberta Joy Rich, Jane O’Sullivan, Elly Kent, Stephanie Siu, Zoe Theodore, Natasha Bullock, and Erica Tarquinio in the two-part issue 'The Fever' in May 2025.

== Online archive ==
The Art + Australia website, hosted at the Victorian College of the Arts, University of Melbourne and supported by the bequest of Western Australian dermatologist, art collector, and philanthropist Harold Schenberg, is a platform to share the magazine archive of over fifty years and daily news. Past issues of the magazine from 1963 to the present were scanned in entirety in two levels of resolution and made openly available online in 2024.

== Reception ==
Green and Barker in 2025 place Art and Australia of the 1970s amongst "coffee-table-friendly, glossy" art magazines that promoted the "status quo" against a growing competition starting with Other Voices, a journal of art criticism edited by Terry Smith and Paul McGillick, who intended to offer an alternative to Art and Australia, still "the only Australian art magazine professionally and continuously published at the time", by presenting "serious writing about the newest art". Indeed, in September 1967 the magazine devoted a special issue to the retrospective exhibition at the Art Gallery of NSW honouring Australian painter Sidney Nolan's 50th year. Nevertheless Wilson (2009) highlights the magazine's prescience, amongst the international journals also read by local artists – Art International, Artforum and ARTnews – even before the 1968 seminal exhibition The Field was staged at the new campus of the National Gallery of Victoria:

In [the Art and Australia] March 1966 issue, the Australian sculptor Clement Meadmore...contributed the article ‘New York Scene II – Colour as an Idiom’, with full-colour reproductions of paintings by Gene Davis, Barnett Newman, Jules Olitski, Morris Louis and Kenneth Noland. Therefore, when The Field finally opened in Melbourne, the work which it presented already had its supporters and its detractors and Australian art critics were chomping at the bit.

Mendelssohn writing in 2014, considered Art & Australia "the most significant continuing publication on Australian art. It has often been the first published source of information and research on Australian artists, and has a long-standing practice of reviewing books on Australian art and major exhibitions".

== Editors ==
=== Current (as of 2025) ===
- 2003: Eleonora Triguboff
- 2016: Su Baker, editor-in-chief
- 2016: Edward Colless
- 2016: Tessa Laird, online editor
- 2023: Jeremy Eaton, editor

=== Past ===
- 1963–1983: Mervyn Horton
- 1983–1986: Elwyn Lynn
- 1987–1987: Jennifer Phipps
- 1987–1992: Leon Paroissien
- 1990–1996: Dinah Dysart
- 1996–1997: Hannah Fink
- 1997–2003: Laura Murray Cree
- 2003–2006: Claire Armstrong
- 2006–2008: Katrina Schwarz
- 2007–2012: Michael Fitzgerald

== Editorial Advisers ==
The magazine has involved distinguished editorial advisers.

=== Current (as of 2025) ===
- Su Baker
- Anthony White
- Christopher Marshall
- Claire Roberts
- Anne Marsh
- Janelle Evans
- Natalie King
- Charlotte Day
- Kit Messham-Muir
- Wulan Dirgantoro
- Edward Colless
- Sean Lowry

=== Past ===
- Yuji Abe
- Jenny Åland
- Claire Armstrong
- Leigh Astbury
- Paul Beadle
- Pamela Bell
- Tony Bond
- Kym Bonython
- John Brack
- Gregory Burke
- Janine Burke
- Thomas Berghuis
- Rex Butler
- Joanna Capon
- Melvin N. Day
- Max Delany
- John Denton
- Geoffrey Dutton
- Dinah Dysart
- Juliana Engberg
- Tom Gibbons
- James Gleeson
- Ted Gott
- Guy Grey-Smith
- Sasha Grishin
- Robert Haines
- Deborah Hart
- Leonard Hessing
- Ursula Hoff
- Richard Hook
- Jeanette Hoorn
- John Hoy
- Jennifer Isaacs
- Hamish Keith
- Franz Kempf
- Brian Ladd
- Paula Latos-Valier
- Suzanne Lord
- Ross Luck
- Victoria Lynn
- Jeffrey Makin
- Fred Martin
- Louise Martin-Chew
- Ronald Millen
- Djon Mundine
- K. Okamoto
- John Olsen
- Fabio Ongarato
- Leon Parossien
- Justin Paton
- Stephen Rainbird
- Kate Rhodes
- Liane Rossler
- Eric Rowlinson
- Gene Sherman
- Russell Storer
- Andrew Sayers
- Brian Seidel
- Michael Shannon
- Rose Skinner
- Trevor Smith
- Mitchell Oakley Smith
- Ted Snell
- Henry A. Stroud
- Graeme Sturgeon
- Daniel Thomas
- Laurie Thomas
- Wallace Thornton
- Peter Timms
- Angus Trumble
- Sarah Tutton
- Kurt von Meier
- Anna Waldmann
- Nick Waterlow
- Chisaburoh F. Yamada

== Selected contributors ==
- Murray Bail
- Lily Brett
- Brian Castro
- Nick Cave
- Robyn Davidson
- Luke Davies
- Rosemary Dobson
- Richard Flanagan
- Sia Figiel
- Gwen Harwood
- Robert Hughes
- Siri Hustvedt
- Ivor Indyk
- Linda Jaivin
- Nicholas Jose
- Evelyn Juers
- Alex Miller
- Drusilla Modjeska
- Louis Nowra
- Daniel Palmer
- Mandy Sayer
- Barry Schwabsky
- Thomas Shapcott
- Sebastian Smee
- Alexis Wright

== Selected cover artists ==
- Ian Fairweather
- Margaret Preston
- Sidney Nolan
- Colin McCahon
- Robert Jacks
- Sydney Ball
- Stanislaus Rapotec
- Tony Tuckson
- Robert Rooney
- Russell Drysdale
- Declan Apuatimi
- Tim Leura Tjapaltjarri
- Nora Heysen
- Jenny Watson
- Wendy Sharpe
- Rosalie Gascoigne
- Emily Kame Kngwarreye
- Fiona Hall
- Bill Henson
- Martin Sharp
- Chicks on Speed

== Book publications ==
Art & Australia Pty Ltd was the publishing house that printed Art & Australia and which, with Dott Publishing, produced art books and artist collaborative books including:

- Kent, Rachel; Croft, Brenda L. (2008). Current : contemporary art from Australia and New Zealand. Dott Publishing. ISBN 978-0-9805034-0-1.
- Barton, Del Kathryn; Wilde, Oscar (2013). Oscar Wilde's The nightingale and the rose (3rd ed.). Art & Australia. ISBN 978-0-646-57684-8.
- Art & Australia, ed. (2014). Chinese zodiac. Introduction by Benjamin Law. Dott Publishing. ISBN 978-0-646-92738-1.
- Art & Australia (2016). Colless, Edward (ed.). Artist's choice : five decades of artists' writing : essays from Art & Australia magazine 1967-2014 (1st ed.). Dott Publishing an imprint of Artand Foundation. ISBN 978-0-646-92695-7.
- Castro, Brian; Carter, Paul; Young, John; Colless, Edward; Castro, Brian; University of Adelaide. EU Centre for Global Affairs, (funding body.); University of Adelaide J.M. Coetzee Centre for Creative Practice (2017). Macau days : Dias de Macau = Aomen sui yue. Southbank, Melbourne: Art + Australia Publishing. ISBN 978-0-9953925-2-6.
- van Schaik, Jan, ed. (2018). Writing & concepts 2016. A+A Publishing, Victorian College of the Arts. ISBN 978-0-9953925-6-4.
- Colless, Edward; Duchamp, Marcel, eds. (2018). Apostrophe Duchamp: A 'Duchampian double-cross and disjecta membra or an antarctic aporia, apophatic apologia, apodeictic apotheosis, apogryphal antidote, antipathetic apostasy, antagonistic antiparticle, and antipodal atrocity A'. Document series. Southbank Victoria: Art + Australia Publishing. ISBN 978-0-9953925-5-7.
- Green, Charles; Cattapan, Jon, eds. (2021). Afterstorm: Gardens, Art, Conflict. Southbank, Victoria: Art + Australia Publishing. ISBN 9780648547457.
- Russell, Francis; Attwood, David, eds. (2020). The art of laziness : contemporary art and post-work politics. A+A Publishing. ISBN 978-0-9924589-0-4.
- Colless, Edward; Eastwood, David; Lehmann, Chelsea; Thomas, Paul, eds. (2022). Dark eden : transdisciplinary imaging at the intersections of art, science and culture. A+A Publishing and Victorian College of the Arts, University of Melbourne. ISBN 978-0-645-54430-5.
- Gerbutt, Michael; Ashrafi, Soheil, eds. (2024). The nomadic image : explorations at the intersections of art, science, and culture. A+A Publishing and Victorian College of the Arts, University of Melbourne. ISBN 978-0-7340-5721-1.
