= Helen Ennis =

Australian photography curator, historian, and writer

Professor Helen Ennis FAHA
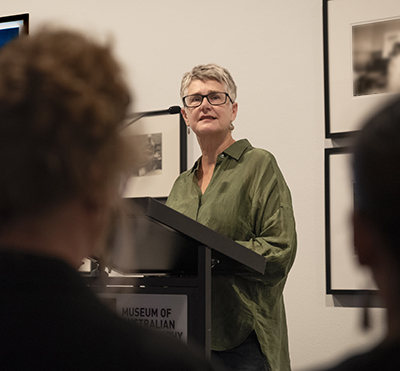
- Helen Ennis speaks at the Museum of Australian Photography, March 2025
- Born: New Zealand
- Citizenship: Australian
- Occupations: curator, historian, critic and art writer
- Years active: 1981–present
- Known for: Ennis, Helen (2007). Photography and Australia. London: Reaktion Books. ISBN 978-1-86189-323-9.
- Notable work: Ennis, Helen (2019). Olive Cotton : a life in photography. Fourth Estate. ISBN 978-1-4607-1204-7.
- Partner: Roger Butler
- Awards: Sir William Dobell Chair of Art History; Royal Photographic Society J Dudley Johnston Award/Medal; Victorian Premier's Non-fiction Prize, 2006; Best Book (Power Institute of Fine Arts and Art Association of Australia and New Zealand); 2020 Magarey Medal for biography and the Queensland Literary Awards Non-fiction Prize.

Helen Ennis FAHA is an Australian photography curator, historian, critic and art writer. She undertakes curatorial work, academic research, and biography. Trained as an assistant curator at the National Gallery of Australia, Canberra in 1981, she delivered numbers of lectures there on international and Australian photography, then served as Curator of International and Australian Photography 1985–1992. Ennis pioneered major exhibitions of contemporary work including Australian Photography - The 1980s and published on Australian photographic history.

From 1991 Ennis contributed reviews of craft and photography exhibitions and book reviews for the Canberra Times, and after leaving the National Gallery she undertook independent research, writing on Sue Ford, Peter Peryer, Harold Cazneaux and Olive Cotton and curated Pictograms: Aspects of Contemporary Australian Photographic Practice, which toured nationally.

Ennis lectured in Art Theory at the Australian National University (ANU) School of Art & Design 1996–2018, and convened the School's Graduate Research program. She intensified her research with the 2006 publication Intersections: Photography, History, and the National Library of Australia; her 2007 Photography and Australia reached an international audience; as curator Ennis organised Reveries: photography & mortality a touring exhibition for the National Portrait Gallery, Canberra, and wrote its catalogue; and other diverse exhibitions; Mirror with a Memory: Photographic Portraiture in Australia (National Portrait Gallery, 2000); a retrospective of Olive Cotton's photographs (Art Gallery of NSW, 2000); In a New Light: Australian Photography 1850s-2000 (National Library of Australia, 2003–2004); European émigré photographer Margaret Michaelis's work (National Gallery of Australia, 2005); and Things: Photographing the Constructed World (National Library of Australia, 2012). In 2008 with the National Library of Australia Ennis provided international online access to an exhibition of Charles Bayliss's nineteenth-century photographs of early Sydney. She was promoted to a professorship in 2014 and served as the director of the Centre of Art History and Art Theory in the Sir William Dobell Chair of Art History until 2018.

Professor Ennis has written numerous essays and chapters, and since 2000 has been sole author of more than fifteen significant books including biographies of women in Australian photography; Margaret Michaelis and Olive Cotton, which received major literary awards, and has written on the life of Max Dupain (2024) and the career of Wolfgang Sievers (2025).

A Fellow of the Australian Academy of the Humanities (elected 2014) Ennis's research and curatorships for major institutions are recognised for their influence in raising the standing and significance of Australian photography in international contexts.

== Career ==
=== National Gallery of Australia ===
After completing a BA (Hons) in visual arts at Monash University, Helen Ennis was appointed in 1981 as an assistant curator under 1971–1989 director James Mollison, 'a devotee of photography', in the Department of Photography at the National Gallery of Australia in Canberra where, as Sasha Grishin writes, she was among a generation of young curators trained there, including Andrew Sayers, Mary Eagle, and Isobel Crombie, 'who spread the "ANG professionalism" throughout the country.’

Ennis delivered lectures through the 1980s on diverse subjects for the Gallery and its members, including 'Colour Photography'; New American Colour Photography; 'Here Comes the New Photography'; 'Selections from the Photography Collection'; 'Diane Arbus and the Dark Side;' American photography of the period 1930s-1970s; a preview of Australian Photography from the Kodak Fund; 'Tongue In Cheek: Boyd Webb'; 'Altered Images: William Wegeman'; 'Just Another Sunrise: Jon Rhodes'; 'Big Pictures: Australian Photography 1975 -1985; 'The Glamour Show: star and celebrity portraits'; 'Robyn Stacey's fantastic visions'; 'New Art for a New Time. Photography between the wars'; presented on Wolfgang Sievers to the Art Museums Association of Australia; joined a panel of other NGA curators in 1986 to answer questions from the public about the Gallery; and participated in a PhotoAccess seminar on censorship.

Ennis was promoted to Curator of International and Australian Photography, a position she held from 1985 to 1992, and pioneered a significant series of scholarly exhibitions and publications. Grace, writing in 1988 sees her curatorship of Australian Photography - The 1980s, as concentrating on 'contemporary work' but complimenting 'the overall picture which is presented in [...] Shades of Light - Photography and Australia 1839-1988' (in which she wrote a chapter), the exhibition curated by Ennis's colleague Gael Newton, who had been appointed as visiting curator in the National Gallery for the 1985–1988 Bicentennial Photography Project. The two curators conducted sessions at an all-day, well-attended seminar on the exhibition for tertiary students. Against Ennis's enthusiasm for the contemporary, the Gallery was perceived by some to later devote too many exhibitions and its funds to historical imagery; Garry Raphael, in reviewing the 1990 showing of recent acquisitions feared that 'the gallery's penchant for the past might leave contemporary Australian photographers lamenting in the wilderness' but that Mollison's and Ennis's purchases were 'not the problem'.

=== Art critic ===
Following her curatorial role at the National Gallery, Ennis contributed reviews for a column on craft in The Canberra Times from November 1991, when in the early nineties there were but five women in such a role amongst twice as many men. When a correspondent questioned her credentials, the editor responded fulsomely in her defence. In Max Dupain, a Portrait, she quotes Baudelaire's comment that 'criticism must be partial, passionate, political.'

Until 1996 she also wrote critique on photography for the newspaper; on exhibitions that included Who Do You Take Me For? contemporary British and Australian Photography at the Canberra School of Art Gallery;Embodied: Six Canberra Photographers, Canberra Contemporary Art Space; The Felix H. Man Memorial Prize; Max Dupain–Dreams: Sensuous and Surreal, National Gallery of Australia, about which she expressed her unease 'with Dupain's reincarnation as a surrealist'; Kodak Fund 10th Anniversary Show, National Gallery of Australia, in which she surveyed 10 years of acquisitions through the fund; Beyond Recognition: Contemporary International Photography, National Gallery of Australia; BlOhazard: Melita Dahl and Benita Tunks at Canberra Contemporary Art Space; From the Empire's End: Nine Australian Photographers, Drill Hall Gallery; Christopher Meder, Polish Ex-Servicemen's Association Club; Dressed to Kill: 100 Years of Fashion, NGA; Images of Work and Leisure, Parliament House; Queerography, Canberra Contemporary Art Space; The Brides: Tracing a Modern Odyssey, ANU Drill Hall Gallery; Heidi Smith, The Canberrans: A Vintage Selection, Legislative Assembly Building; Taken to Heart: Recent Documentary Photography. NGA; About Face. Aspects of Australian Portraiture, c.1770-1993, National Portrait Gallery; with items on specific photographers including Werner Bischof, Axel Poignant, Bill Henson, Hedda Morrison; and book reviews. She also used her platform in the Canberra newspaper to promote the activities of the local community group PhotoAccess.

=== Independent scholar ===
Ennis established herself in this period as an independent curator and writer specialising in Australian photographic practice and biography.

In 1990, writing for an exhibition of photographic works by Australians, five artists and twenty filmmakers at Presentation House Gallery, North Vancouver and other galleries, 7 April 1990 – 3 March 1991, Ennis surveyed developments in Australian art photography, its socio-cultural influences, and challenges. She noted the paucity of written photographic histories before 1970 and the dominance of American photography shaping global perceptions. The 1970s revival of photography as an art form she credited to conceptual artists from other disciplines experimenting with photography, which a younger generation embraced it as a modern, socially relevant medium free from restraints of traditional art media, as did Carol Jerrems. Despite enthusiasm, Australian art photography faced market barriers of limited growth in a small population and collector resistance, state galleries commenced collecting in the 1980s, while only the Australian National Gallery developed a comprehensive program. Support from the Australia Council provided grants for community-based projects, but commercial galleries struggled. The late 1980s brought multiculturalism and cultural identity shifts through contributions from migrant and Aboriginal photographers like Tracey Moffatt. However, Australia's engagement with Asian photography remained limited despite geographical proximity. Ennis advocated for dialogue between regional centres like Australia and Canada for mutual understanding and appreciation of their unique photographic identities.

Ennis wrote catalogue essays in 1993; for Sue Ford's exhibition at the Canberra School of Art Gallery From Van Diemens Land to Video Land: Colour laser prints by Sue Ford; and for a survey of New Zealand photographer Peter Peryer, in whose work she finds 'thingness' loved without distinction between 'species or substances, [...] all are given the same rapt attention'. That year she wrote for the popular National Gallery touring exhibition Surrealism: Revolution by Night, suggesting that the success of Rayogram was achieved by transformation of the object's physicality into abstraction, for a 'revelation of an unknown universe.'

Ennis contributed an introduction for Harold Cazneaux: the quiet observer, published in 1994, an extract from which appeared in the press. Funded that year by a $10,000 writer's project grant from the Literature Board of the Australia Council, she made early investigations of the previously overlooked professional colleague and first wife of Max Dupain, Olive Cotton, welcomed by reviewer Holt as offering persuasive 'evidence of Cotton’s stylistic versatility and exploration of continuities throughout Cotton’s life and work: her love of nature, fascination with light and space, responsiveness to her chosen (and fortuitously encountered) subjects, dedication and inventiveness.' Ennis returned to these themes in a more extensive biography of Cotton that she was to publish in 2019. She returned to curating with an exhibition of 'post-photography', including digital imaging by nine artists from around Australia and New Zealand titled Pictograms: Aspects of Contemporary Australian Photographic Practice, at the Nolan Gallery, which toured nationally.

=== Academia ===
From 1996 to 2018. Ennis lectured in Art Theory at the Australian National University (ANU) School of Art & Design, driven by a sense that 'we still have a great deal to do: identifying and retrieving objects from the past that must be kept', to undertake, according to Moore, an holistic, collective photographic project inspired by novelist David Malouf's vision of a 'dream history', 'a myth history, a history of experience in the imagination.'

Reviewing Ennis's 2006 Intersections: Photography, History, and the National Library of Australia, Catherine de Lorenzo characterises the author's approach as 'wearing her historical knowledge lightly' while favouring subjective, shifting interpretations. She critiques the notion of the 'expert' voice and instead foregrounds the diversity of cultures in Australia.

During this period Ennis wrote the history Photography and Australia for a series on national photographies (2007), and Reveries: photography & mortality for the National Portrait Gallery, Canberra, (also published 2007) supporting an exhibition of that name which toured the University of Queensland Art Museum and the Mornington Peninsula Regional Gallery. She presented at a conference 'Love & Desire: Literature and the Intimate' held 23–24 September 2006 at the National Library of Australia, and in 2008 at the Ballets Russes Symposium at the University of Adelaide on Australians who photographed the Ballets Russes, concentrating on Max Dupain's images in the National Library's Pictures Collection. The National Library of Australia's venture into digitisation of its collection provided Ennis with the opportunity to provide international access to Charles Bayliss's nineteenth-century photographs of early Sydney through an online catalogue of the exhibition she curated at the Library 11 July–26 October 2008. In A Modern Vision: Charles Bayliss, Photographer, 1850-1897, as Clark notes, Ennis represents Bayliss as a modernist, distinct from the naturalist representations of Charles Kerry, J. W. Lindt and Nicholas Caire, in being concerned with poeticising place 'rather than depicting a nostalgia for the pioneering past. Through his photography Bayliss depicted an escape from the ‘toil of city life’, and it is this, Ennis argues, that sets Bayliss apart as a modernist visionary.'

==== Photography and Australia ====
In approaching the writing of Photography and Australia for its international audience she notes that the advent of photography coincides with the European colonisation of Australia and the dispossession of its indigenous peoples, but declares in her Introduction that she rejects the idea of creating merely a continuous, chronological, 'winner-oriented' historical narrative and instead adopts multiple methodologies to explore different photographic works. Each chapter is a self-contained essay focused on specific themes, styles, or ideas, with overlaps and interconnections encouraged to enrich the work’s internal complexity.'

Ennis writes that while Australian photography is technologically aligned with global trends, it is shaped by a colonial history, in alignment with other colonised nations so that themes such as Indigenous-settler relations, landscape mythology, migration, and national identity recur. Ennis highlights realism as a defining characteristic, reflecting settler culture and nation-building. While acknowledging the few previous accounts, Jack Cato's 1955 The Story of the Camera in Australia; Gael Newton's Shades of Light: Photography and Australia 1839–1988 (to which Ennis contributed); and Anne-Marie Willis's Picturing Australia: A History of Photography also of 1988, the nation's bicentennial year, Ennis notes gaps in historical research, particularly in early colonial photography, calling for further study. Bell notes Ennis's summation of the influences of immigration and the multicultural experience on visual narratives in addressing the issue of localism and internationalism in Australian photography.

Amongst Ennis's other writings in 2011 was a paper on the historiography of Australian photography, and a reflection revisiting Reveries: photography & mortality, to consider 'raw' vernacular photography against the 'professional, mostly art‐trained, photographers from Australia and New Zealand' in that show and the reemergence in the 1980s of photographing the dying and dead in Australia to approach levels of production of the later nineteenth century, and which burgeoned with the advent of digital photography 'giving their users unprecedented degrees of control and privacy.'

Ennis's expertise and contributions were recognised in her promotion to a professorship in 2014. She further served as the director of the Centre of Art History and Art Theory and held the prestigious Sir William Dobell Chair of Art History from 2014 to 2018. Throughout her academic tenure, she also convened the School's Graduate Research program.

== Curatorship ==
Professor Ennis has curated numerous significant exhibitions for Australia's premier cultural institutions by drawing on her knowledge of photography and its historical significance, with major survey projects being Australian Photography: The 1980s at the Australian National Gallery in 1988; Mirror with a Memory: Photographic Portraiture in Australia held at the National Portrait Gallery in 2000, not long after its opening, which demonstrated the lack of distinction between the vernacular and fine art applications in the genre; a retrospective exhibition of Olive Cotton's photographs (Art Gallery of NSW, 2000); and In a New Light: Australian Photography 1850s-2000 (National Library of Australia, 2003–2004). Her more focused exhibitions include a mid-career survey of Sue Ford's work at Monash University Museum of Art in 1995; the assembly of European émigré photographer Margaret Michaelis's work at the National Gallery of Australia in 2005, Reveries: Photography and Mortality (Australian National Portrait Gallery, 2007) surveying artist-photographers who 'deal with the last phase of people’s lives', A Modern Vision: Charles Bayliss, Photographer, 1850-1897 (National Library of Australia, 2008), and Things: Photographing the Constructed World (National Library of Australia, 2012).

== Awards and recognition ==
Helen Ennis's contributions to photography criticism and history have earned her accolades including the epithet 'Australia’s pre-eminent writer about art photography'. In 1983 International Photography 1920-1980 was awarded first prize in The Canberra Book of the Year Awards. In 2021, she received the J Dudley Johnston Award/Medal from the Royal Photographic Society, recognising "major achievement in the field of photographic criticism or the history of photography" and acknowledging her "sustained excellence over a period of time"

Her biographical works have been particularly rewarded. Margaret Michaelis: Love, Loss and Photography (2005) was awarded in 2006 the Nettie Palmer Prize for Non-Fiction, and the Best Book award by the Power Institute of Fine Arts and Art Association of Australia and New Zealand. Her 2019 biography, Olive Cotton: A Life in Photography (2019), received the 2020 Magarey Medal for Biography and the Queensland Literary Awards Non-fiction Prize. Her 2024 book Max Dupain: A Portrait won the 2026 National Biography Award and was shortlisted for the 2025 Nib Literary Award.

Additionally, the publication accompanying her exhibition Reveries: Photography and Mortality was recognised with both 'Best Exhibition Catalogue, Major' and 'Best in Show' at the Museums Australia 2009 Multimedia and Publication Design Awards.

Ennis was elected a Fellow of the Australian Academy of the Humanities in 2014.

== Professional service ==
Beyond her academic and curatorial work, Helen Ennis serves as a certified valuer for the Australian Government's Cultural Gifts Program, providing expert assessment of photographic works.

== Personal life ==
Helen Ennis is the daughter of Janet (née Hannah) and David Ennis, and married print curator and art historian Roger Butler. They have two sons.

== Publications ==
- Ennis, Helen; Crombie, Isobel; Australian National Gallery (1982). North, Ian (ed.). International photography 1920- 1980. Canberra: Australian National Gallery in association with an inaugural exhibition at the Gallery. ISBN 978-0-642-88887-7.
- Ennis, Helen; Davidson, Kate (1988). Australian Photography : the 1980s : an exhibition from the Australian National Gallery sponsored by Kodak. Australian National Gallery. ISBN 978-0642081599.
- Ennis, Helen; McInerney, Sally; Cotton, Olive (1995). "Introduction". Olive Cotton: photographer. Canberra: National Library of Australia. ISBN 9780642276117.
- Ennis, Helen (2000). Olive Cotton. New South Wales: Art Gallery of New South Wales. ISBN 0734763034.
- Ennis, Helen (2000). Mirror with a memory: photographic portraiture in Australia. Canberra: National Portrait Gallery. ISBN 064270483X.
- Ennis, Helen (2002). Man with a camera: Frank Hurley overseas. Canberra: National Library of Australia. ISBN 0642107378.
- Ennis, Helen (2003). In a new light: Australian Photography 1850s-1930s. Canberra: National Library of Australia. ISBN 0-642-10773-4.
- Ennis, Helen (2004). Intersections: Photography, History and the National Library of Australia. Canberra: National Library of Australia. ISBN 0-642-10792-0.
- Ennis, Helen (2005). Margaret Michaelis Love, Loss And Photography. Canberra: National Gallery of Australia. ISBN 978-0-642-54120-8.
- Ennis, Helen (2007). Photography and Australia. London: Reaktion Books. ISBN 978-1-86189-323-9.
- Ennis, Helen; Bortolotto, Emma; National Portrait Gallery (Australia) (2007). Reveries : photography & mortality. Canberra: National Portrait Gallery. ISBN 978-0-9775761-0-4.
- Ennis, Helen (2008). A modern vision: Charles Bayliss, photographer, 1850-1897. Canberra: National Library of Australia. ISBN 978-0-642-27667-4. (Catalogue of the exhibition held 11 July - 26 October 2008, at the National Library of Australia)
- Ennis, Helen (2010). Frank Hurley's Antarctica. Canberra: National Library of Australia. ISBN 9780642276988.
- Ennis, Helen (2011). Wolfgang Sievers. Canberra: National Library of Australia. ISBN 978-0-642-27759-6.
- Ennis, Helen (2019). Olive Cotton : a life in photography. Fourth Estate. ISBN 978-1-4607-1204-7.
- Ennis, Helen (2024). Max Dupain: a portrait. Pymble, New South Wales: Fourth Estate. ISBN 978-1-4607-6480-0.
- Ennis, Helen (2025). Artists of the National Library of Australia: Wolfgang Sievers. Canberra: National Library of Australia. ISBN 9781922507846.
- Ennis, Helen (2025). Artists of the National Library of Australia: Olive Cotton. Canberra: National Library of Australia. ISBN 9781922507839.
