= Gerald Thompson =

Gerald Thompson may refer to:

- Gerald L. Thompson (1923-2009), professor and mathematical scientist
- Gerald Marr Thompson (1856–1938), Australian arts critic
- Gerald Thompson (1917-2002), British filmmaker and founder of Oxford Scientific Films

== See also ==
- Colonel Jerald L. Thompson, victim of the 1994 Black Hawk shootdown incident
