= Gael Newton =

Australian art historian and curator

Gael Lauraine Newton AM (1949– ) is an Australian art historian and curator specialising in surveys and studies of photography across the Asia-Pacific region. Newton was formerly curator of photography at the Art Gallery of New South Wales, and the Senior Curator of Australian and International Photography at the National Gallery of Australia (NGA) in Canberra.

== Education ==
After her secondary education at Manly Girls High, Newton took studies as one of the first intake into the Power Department of Fine Art at the University of Sydney in 1969-1972 then, pursuing an interest in art practice, enrolled at the Elam Art School in Auckland where photography was a compulsory subject in first year, and was awarded a Bachelor of Fine Art majoring in photography in 1974. She started a Masters degree in art history which was interrupted by a move back to Australia in 1974 and a series of temporary positions at the Art Gallery of New South Wales which introduced the desirability of a career in art museum curatorship, in which she was further encouraged by historian Joan Kerr. After her marriage Newton lived in 1976 in Glebe and later, Cremorne.

== Career ==
=== Art Gallery of New South Wales ===
Newton, mentored by Daniel Thomas, was the foundation curator of photography at the Art Gallery of New South Wales from 1974-1985, and processed the Cazneaux sisters' donation of their father's prints as the foundation of the collection. Her 1979 public talk 'John Cato: The Photographic Essay' comparing him to Americans White and Steiglitz, and a 'promenade lecture' on 'Australian Pictorial Photography', are examples of her intention to set Australian photography in an international context. Critic Nancy Borlase acknowledged that the gallery's photography collection was 'non-existent' prior to Newton efforts, while Tony Perry in Melbourne remarked that 'all praise is due to Newton for her scholarly research and discriminating selection'.

==== Curation and publication ====
In 1980, Newton had three books released; Max Dupain photographs 1928-1980; Philip Geeves presents Cazneaux's Sydney 1904-1934; and Silver and Grey: Fifty Years of Australian Photography, a critical survey of Australian Pictorialist photography which in 1981 was awarded 'Best Art Book' by The Australian Book Publishers Association.

Among her several curated shows was her exhibition and accompanying publication that assembled the works of Max Dupain in 1980, and which brought him to attention as one of Australia's most significant photographers. In the accompanying book, in which she expanded on knowledge of the work of John Kauffmann and Harold Cazneaux, Newton notes in discussing Dupain's early Pictorialist work that ‘Theoretically, the movement was an extension of the eighteenth-century notions of the Picturesque and nineteenth century Romantic ideas.' Later, in relation to his modernist and documentary work, she praised Dupain's pre-eminence in 'photographing powerful, pure forms that make direct statements about the real world. He hammers chaos and complex material down to a lucid, simple image. The tension level between the forms and angles of movement in his photographs is always perfectly held.'

Dupain however, in reviewing Newton's more radical and contemporary Re-constructed Vision of 56 works by young, experimental Australian photographers in 1981, did not reciprocate her support and promotion of him: 'Now we are back with photography mixed up with paint brushes, screen printing, scissors and paste. Once again, we are corrupting the pure and beautiful image made by straight camera technique. The full impact of this collection is disturbing. It makes you feel you are in a kind of ward for photo-psychos.' He did acknowledge however that some 'assert[ed] themselves on the conscious [sic]': works by Warren Breninger, Mike Parr (via John Delacour), Micky Allan, and Fiona Hall. Arthur McIntyre, reviewing the show in The Age was more in sympathy with Newton's 'refreshingly innovative show' of an 'intelligent selection of artists working in a variety of fields, linked by their use of photography' as a departure from conventional monochrome or colour prints.

Newton displayed a large selection from the growing photography collection at the AGNSW later in 1981, to which Dupain, on whom Newton spoke at the Australian Centre for Photography, in his review responded ambivalently, but included the announcement that the NSW Government was spending $400,000 on a specialist photography gallery at AGNSW.

==== Public profile ====
In augmenting her activities at the Gallery, Newton reviewed photography books on radio and delivered lectures on Australian photography, traveling to the Victorian College of the Arts in Melbourne to give a public presentation.

=== National Gallery of Australia ===
==== Bicentennial Photography Project ====
From August 1985 Newton joined the National Gallery of Australia under director James Mollison as visiting curator for the 1985–1988 Bicentennial Photography Project. Announcing her appointment in The Sydney Morning Herald, Dupain wrote that Newton's concern was with 'photography which is not applied photography as realised by the multifarious departments it serves, from medicine to advertising. Her deepest belief is that the mystical experience sensed in the presence of great photography can be as profound as the same experience in the presence of great art.'

In this role Newton was a contributor to the catalogue, alongside leading Australian scholars, of the Bicentennial art exhibition Creating Australia: 200 Years of Art 1788–1988, presented by the Australian Bicentennial Authority and directed by Daniel Thomas, then Head of Australian Art at the South Australian Art Gallery who, as Millner notes, promoted "its ‘embrace’ of Aboriginal art not as ethnographic curio but as art proper." For the Bicentenary Newton researched and mounted the 700-work exhibition Shades of Light: Photography and Australia 1839-1988, which was welcomed by reviewer Marie Geissler for its attention to images of women, and by Sylvia Kleinert who noted Newton's demonstration of photographic practice permeating "scientific, industrial and technical spheres." Her seminar on the exhibition was enthusiastically attended by students. The publication under that title remains the standard reference work on the history of Australian photography. Of the widely reviewed book, David Doolan commented:

Helen Ennis and Chris Long [successive curators of photography at the National Gallery] have contributed the excellent final chapters on Contemporary Photographic Practices and Natural Colour Photography 1895-1960 respectively, but Shades of Light is Gael Newton's book. It is the mature fruit of many years' work. Throughout the book, Newton and her contributors tackle the broad and seemingly eternal questions of nationalism and provincialism, [though] Newton points out that from the earliest years time-lags were brief as far as technical innovations were concerned. This was not always the case for artistic innovations. Another theme which runs through most of the book is the treatment of Aboriginal people and culture. We also see how a variety of intellectual forces and fashions, from Marxism and feminism to fashion, consumerism and counter-culture, have manifested themselves in Australian photography.

==== Curatorship ====
On joining the National Gallery as a visiting curator Newton worked alongside the well established photography department curators Helen Ennis and Kate Davidson. From about 1988-1990 she was employed as a lecturer in the Education department before taking up the position of Curator of Australian Photography on the departure of Helen Ennis, and later adding international photography on the resignation of Kate Davidson, to become Senior Curator Photography, with assistant curator Anne O’Hehir, until retirement in 2014.

Other exhibitions Newton curated at the National Gallery included Photographs by Carol Jerrems and Wes Stacey, March-May 1991, after Newton, having spent several years in the Education Office of the Gallery, had been appointed Curator of Australian, and later of International photography. In that role she set to the task of expanding the gallery's holdings in that medium. Recognising the 1980s emergence of First Nations photographers Newton employed Kodak Australia funds to bring their work into the permanent collection.

==== Speaker ====
During her time at the NGA Newton, an engaging and knowledgeable speaker, delivered public lectures on subjects as diverse as 'Richard Long's Stones in Morocco', Italian artist Giovanni Anselmo, 'Ansel Adams and the American Landscape', a series on 'The Development of Australian Photography', and photography as art, including as Education Lecturer following the end of her Bicentennial contract in 1988, with presentations of 'The Virtues of Marriage: Tiepolo's Marriage Allegory', 'Ritual and Production–The making of Aboriginal bark paintings', 'The History of Photography', 'Equivalence: Works by Alfred Stieglitz', 'A Global Picture: The development of photography in the nineteenth century' 'The Bush Seen: Views of Rural Life–Prints from the 1880s', on printmaker Jessie Traill, and Bill Henson, and floor talks and promenades through Gallery exhibitions. In 1990 for the NGA's blockbuster Civilisation: Ancient Treasures from the British Museum, she presented 'The Standard of Ur', 'Venus Transformed: The changing image ol woman in the ancient world,' and 'From the Flood Tablet to Kandinsky: Images of the Deluge', for the exhibition Tracey Moffatt: Something More, provided an introductory lecture, and spoke in November that year on 'Colour Music: Roy de Maistre's abstractions and the colour theories of M.E. Chevreul' and in December on 'Love is Blue: Nijinsky's Le Dieu Bleu costume, 1912'. These were followed in 1991 by lectures on Sydney Modernist Eleanor Lange,

==== Published research ====
Newton's published work includes monographs on Australian photographers: Harold Cazneaux, Max Dupain, John Kauffmann and Tracey Moffatt as well as on a number of expatriate Australian and New Zealand photographers including Asia-based photojournalist Brian Brake, on Life magazine staff photographer George Silk, and on New York pioneer colour photographer, Anton Bruehl.

==== Collection building ====
From 2004 at the instigation of the new National Gallery of Australia Director Ron Radford, Newton established a collection surveying Asia-Pacific photography, incorporating works from several major private collections, with one contributing 4,000 Indonesian photographs of the colonial period. Two major exhibitions were mounted from the new collection; the 2008 Picture Paradise: Asia-Pacific photography 1840s-1940s. and Garden of East: photography in Indonesia 1850s–1940s in 2014, both of which resulted in book publications. Palmer notes that in '1988, when curator Gael Newton published the first comprehensive history of Australian photography, Shades of Light, on the occasion of the Bicentennial commemorating British settlement, photography by Asian Australians barely registered... [but] ...two decades after Shades of Light, Gael Newton’s important exhibition Picture Paradise: Asia-Pacific Photography 1840s–1940s (2008) presented a new understanding of Australian historical photography in a regional context.'

In 2007 Newton contributed entries on 'Animal and Zoological Photography'; on photographers Richard Daintree, James Deane, Henry Beaufoy Merlin, and Colonel Archibald Henry Plantagenent Stuart-Wortley; and two South East Asia national surveys 'South-East Asia: Malaya, Singapore, and Philippines', and 'South-East Asia: Thailand, Burma, and Indochina (Cambodia, Vietnam, Laos),' to John Hannavy's Encyclopedia of Nineteenth Century Photography, and served on its board of advisors.

== Consultant researcher ==
Newton left the National Gallery in September 2014 and using her expertise in museum research, education and art conservation practice, established an independent consultancy as a researcher and curator in photography, arts and the humanities, and as an accredited valuer. She provides research services and curatorial policy advice on Australian and Southeast Asian photography to collectors, dealers and national museums. Living since 2024 in Melbourne, Newton keeps extensive contacts in the field and provides formal and informal expert advice to members of her worldwide network. Newton continues to research overlooked Asia-Pacific salon, commercial, modernist, and magazine photographers of the 1900s-1960s, in the course of which she has investigated John Thomson's photo-documentation in Southeast Asia, and the regional history of colour photography.

== Recognition ==
On Monday 11 June 2018 Gael Newton was awarded Member of the Order of Australia (AM). The citation read: “For significant service to the visual arts as photography curator, and as an author and researcher, particularly of Southeast Asian photography.”

== Selected exhibitions curated ==
- 1979, June and August: Australian Pictorial Photography. Art Gallery of New South Wales, and Victorian College of the Arts
- 1981, 25 July–23 August: Re-constructed vision: contemporary work with photography. Art Gallery of New South Wales
- 1981: 3 years on: a selection of acquisitions, 1978-1981. Art Gallery of New South Wales
- 1982, 17 July–29 August: Axel Poignant: photographs 1922-1980, Art Gallery of New South Wales; The Art Gallery of Western Australia, 1982; The National Library of Australia, Canberra 1982–1983, National Gallery of Victoria October/November 1983
- 1984: Project No. 46: Grant Mudford (co-curated with Bill Wright) Art Gallery of New South Wales
- 1985, October–November: Scenes from Life, an exhibition of photographs by Robert McFarlane, curated by Gael Newton. Print Room, Woolloomooloo
- 1991, 23 February–12 May: Counterpoints: Photographs by Carol Jerrems and Wes Stacey, National Gallery of Australia
- 1994 11 September-30 1993 - January 1994: Kodak Acquisition Fund Tenth Anniversary Show, National Gallery of Australia
- 1996-1997, 22 June-11 August: Soft but true, John Kauffmann Art Photographer, National Gallery of Australia, Canberra; Bendigo Art Gallery 11 Sep–3 Nov 1996; Art Gallery of New South Wales, 4 Dec 1996–27 Jan 1997; Art Gallery of South Australia, 14 March–27 April 1997; Museum of Modern Art at Heide, 3 June–13 July 1997; Bathurst Regional Art Gallery, 18 July–31 Aug 1997; Toowoomba Regional Art Gallery, 19 September- 2 November 1997
- 2000, 12 August–12 November: Going to extremes: George Silk, photojournalist. National Gallery of Australia
- 2002, 7 September–1 December: Colour concept: international colour photography. National Gallery of Australia
- 2003, 25 January–21 April: The spread of time: the photography of David Moore. National Gallery of Australia
- 2003: The good, the great & the gifted: camera portraits by Yousuf Karsh of Ottawa and Athol Shmith of Melbourne. National Gallery of Australia Travelling Exhibitions

== Publications ==
- Newton, Gael (1979). Australian Pictorial Photography : a survey of art photography from 1898 to 1938. Art Gallery of New South Wales. ISBN 9780724017157.
- Newton, Gael (1980). Silver and grey : fifty years of Australian photography, 1900-1950. Angus & Robertson. ISBN 978-0-207-14109-6.
- Dupain, Max; Newton, Gael (1980). Max Dupain photographs 1928-1980. Sydney: David Ell Press. ISBN 978-0-908197-18-7.
- Newton, Gael (1980). Philip Geeves presents Cazneaux's Sydney 1904-1934. Sydney: David Ell Press. ISBN 9780908197279.
- Newton, Gael; Art Gallery of New South Wales (1981). Re-constructed vision : contemporary work with photography. Sydney, NSW: Art Gallery of New South Wales.
- Newton, Gael (1987). Chronological index to 19th century photographers: chronological, by region (Manuscript supplement to Shades of Light ed.). Art Gallery of New South Wales. OCLC 220850000.
- Newton, Gael; Crombie, Isobel; Davidson, Kate; Ennis, Helen; Long, Chris; Australian National Gallery (1988). Shades of light : photography and Australia 1839-1988. Canberra: Collins Australia. ISBN 978-0-642-08152-0.
- Newton, Gael, ed. (1995). Tracey Moffatt: Fever Pitch. Annandale, N.S.W.: Piper Press. ISBN 9780958798457. OCLC 474323050.
- Newton, Gael (1996). John Kauffmann, Art Photographer, National Gallery of Australia, Published on the occasion of the exhibition Soft but true, held at the National Gallery of Australia, Canberra, 22 June-11 Aug. 1996, as part of the National Gallery of Australia's Travelling Exhibitions program. Canberra: National Gallery of Australia. ISBN 0642130442.
- Brake, Brian; Newton, Gael; National Gallery of Australia (1999). Brian Brake: Monsoon 1960. National Gallery of Australia.
- Newton, Gael; Murphy, Shane; Gray, Michael (2001). Tamiko, Rex (ed.). South with Endurance: Shackleton's Antarctic expedition 1914-1917: the photographs of Frank Hurley. London: Bloomsbury. ISBN 9780747557197.
- Newton, Gael (2008). Picture paradise : Asia-Pacific photography 1840s-1940s. Canberra: National Gallery of Australia. ISBN 9780642541758. OCLC 238552698.
- Gray, Anne; Butler, Roger; Hart, Deborah; McQueen, Humphrey; Newton, Gael; Thomas, Daniel; Varcoe-Cocks, Michael; Vaughan, Gerard; Wise, David John (2015). Tom Roberts. National Gallery of Australia. ISBN 978-0-642-33459-6.
- Newton, Gael; Cox, Matt; Galstyan, Vigen; Groeneveld, Anneke; Lacour, Annabelle; Maxwell, Anne; O'Hehir, Anne; Protschky, Susie; Supartono, Alex (2014). Garden of the East : photography in Indonesia 1850s-1940s. Canberra: National Gallery of Australia. ISBN 978-0-642-33445-9.
