= Geoffrey de Groen =

Australian artist

Geoffrey de Groen (born December 1938) is an Australian artist known for his abstract works in oil and acrylics. De Groen's paintings are included in the collections of the National Gallery of Australia, National Gallery of Victoria, Art Gallery of New South Wales and the Queensland Art Gallery.

== Family life and education ==
Geoffrey de Groen was born in Brisbane, Queensland, his father's Dutch antecedents having emigrated to Australia in 1858. He grew up in Sydney and studied at the Julian Ashton Art School and the North Sydney Technical College, completing his studies at the East Sydney Technical College (now the National Art School) in 1965, under the mentorship of painter and critic Wallace Thornton. In the mid-sixties Geoffrey de Groen married playwright Alma de Groen. They divorced in 1976, and have a daughter, film scholar Nadine de Groen.

== Professional career ==
At the behest of British architect John Pawson, in the late 1960s de Groen left Australia to travel abroad, teaching and exhibiting in England, France, and Canada from 1968 until 1973. On his return to Australia, de Groen's work became widely exhibited. During this period he also lectured in fine art and was prominent among the numbers of Australian art critics for news periodicals, he wrote on art for publications such as the Canberra Times (1973–77) and Art International. A series of recorded interviews which de Groen did with 26 prominent Australian artists is held in the oral history collection of The National Library of Australia in Canberra. These interviews were the basis of de Groen's 1975 book Conversations with Australian Artists, published by Quartet Books. De Groen is also the author of Some other dream: the artist, the artwork, & the expatriate, published by Hale and Iremonger. In 1985 Geoffrey de Groen left the National Art School/East Sydney Technical College, where he had been teaching, to paint full-time.

== The Taralga period ==
In 1992 de Groen moved to the New South Wales regional town of Taralga, where he established a large gallery and working space in refurbished outbuildings near his home. De Groen's 1999 exhibition at the Goulburn Regional Art Gallery featured works from his time in Taralga. In 2000 de Groen was the recipient of the Hesketh and New England Regional Art Museum Overseas Fellowship award. From 2002 to 2007 de Groen was represented by the Boutwell Draper Gallery in Sydney.

In 2003, the New England Regional Art Museum curated an exhibition of de Groen's paintings held in their permanent collection. In 2009 the Goulburn Regional Art Gallery featured an exhibition of a decade of works by de Groen, entitled "Made in Taralga". De Groen continues to live and paint in Taralga. In July 2011, the Australian National University Drill Hall Gallery hosted a survey exhibition of Geoffrey de Groen's work, "Images from the Cage of Time: The Paintings & Drawings of Geoffrey de Groen", curated by Wally Caruana. De Groen's work has featured in more than seventy solo exhibitions including "Inside Out: Recent Paintings of Geoffrey de Groen" at Nancy Sever Gallery in Canberra in 2015.
