= Ruth Faerber =

Australian artist (1922–2024)

- Born: Ruth Levy; 9 October 1922; Woollahra, New South Wales, Australia
- Died: 27 November 2024 (aged 102)
- Education: Sydney Girls High School, Ravenswood School for Girls; East Sydney Technical College
- Known for: Printmaking

Ruth Faerber (9 October 1922 – 27 November 2024) was an Australian printmaker and art critic, known for her use of three-dimensional, mixed media prints using handmade paper, a technique which expanded the boundaries of printmaking in Australia.

== Early life and education ==
Ruth Levy was born in Woollahra, New South Wales on 9 October 1922. She attended Ravenswood School for Girls where her art teacher Gladys Gibbons introduced her to printmaking. She then enrolled in a commercial art school, before studying painting at East Sydney Technical College and, from 1944, at the studio of the Hungarian immigrant painter and printmaker Desiderius Orban.

In 1946, she married Hans Faerber, a design engineer, with whom she had two children. It was not until the 1960s that Faerber was able to return to art professionally. In 1963, she attended classes in lithography at the Workshop Arts Centre in Willoughby, in the lower north shore of Sydney.

== Career ==
By 1967, both the Art Gallery of New South Wales in Sydney and the National Gallery of Victoria in Melbourne had purchased prints by Faerber. In 1967, she received a scholarship to study at the Pratt Center for Contemporary Printmaking in New York. In 1970, Faerber was elected to the committee of the Contemporary Art Society (Australia). She was an art critic for The Australian Jewish Times for ten years, from 1969. Between 1964 and 1995, she held 31 solo exhibitions in Australia, New Zealand, London and Japan. She was artist-in-residence at the Bezalel Academy of Arts and Design in 1987, and received an Australia-Japan Foundation travel grant to attend the Kyoto Paper Convention in 1983.

Faerber experimented with the mediums for her printmaking, including the use of silver foil as the surface for lithography in 1979. In 1980, she studied papermaking at the Jabberwock Papermill in Hobart, and began to use handmade paper as a medium. Artist and art critic Nancy Borlase wrote later that year, "Using a process of pressing, moulding, casting, couching and laminating, Faerber has produced a series of beautifully evocative, landscape-based, mixed-media works that lift printmaking into the sphere of individual bas reliefs." Sasha Grishin wrote that "Faerber's editioned relief prints, made of cast handmade paper, appear as elements from cultural archaeology, like ancient stones which contain, embedded within them, traces of human existence. ... her three-dimensional prints challenge ideas concerning the narrow prescriptive boundaries of printmaking and point to a path which subsequently has been fruitfully explored by a number of other Australian printmakers."

== Awards ==
- 1980 - Pring Prize, Art Gallery of New South Wales

== Collections ==
- National Gallery of Australia, Canberra
- National Gallery of Victoria, Melbourne
- Art Gallery of New South Wales, Sydney
- Queen Victoria Museum & Art Gallery, Launceston, Tasmania
- Tasmanian Museum and Art Gallery
- Christchurch Art Gallery, New Zealand
- Leopold Hoesch Museum, Düren, Germany
