= Mervyn Horton =

Australian art editor (1917–1983)

Mervyn Horton AM
- Born: 27 July 1917; Glebe, New South Wales
- Died: 1 February 1983 (aged 65); Potts Point, New South Wales
- Education: Newington College
- Occupations: Art editor; philanthropist
- Spouse(s): Single; Never married
- Parent(s): Harry Horton and Ethel Mabel (née Harris)

Mervyn Emrys Rosser Horton (27 July 1917 – 1 February 1983) was an Australian art editor, art collector and philanthropist.

== Early life ==
Horton was born at L’Aiglon 278 Glebe Point Road, Glebe, New South Wales, six years after his parents had migrated to Australia. He was the only child of Welsh-born Ethel Mabel (née Harris) and Harry Horton, an English chartered accountant and businessman. His family moved to Penalt in Ashfield from where Horton attended Newington College (1930–1935) He edited the school magazine The Newingtonian and was a committee member of the Newington historical society. In 1936 the Horton’s attended the Berlin Olympics and on his return Horton submitted travel articles to the Sydney Morning Herald. He was offered work with the paper but Harry Horton insisted his son enrol in a profession. He spent a year studying medicine at the University of Sydney before switching to law. Horton was an articled clerk when his father died in 1940.

== Working life ==
The death of his father provided Horton with an income from Traversi Jones and the chance to pursue his natural interests. Although close to graduation he gave up the law. He then became an assistant to photographers Olga Sharpe and Max Dupain, studied cooking and in 1956 he opened an espresso bar and art gallery in Rowe Street, Sydney. He was a patron of the Creative Leisure Movement, and director and editor of Ure Smith Publishers. In 1962 he founded, and until 1983, edited Art and Australia to promote Australian artists. He also edited several picture books of contemporary Australian art.

== Prisoners ==
The Glebe Society, who aim to protect the heritage of Glebe and Forest Lodge in inner Sydney have in recent years credited Horton with writing a play entitled Prisoners which in setting and tone was reminiscent of David Williamson’s The Removalists. Sadly no copy of the play has been located nor does his estate or any Australian library hold a copy.

== Community involvement ==
Horton served as secretary of the Society of Artists, an executive member of the Arts Council of Australia (NSW Division), a board member of the National Trust of Australia (NSW), a trustee of the Art Gallery of New South Wales and an Australian commissioner for the XIIIth Bienal Internacional de São Paulo.

== Honours ==
In 1982, he was made a Member of the Order of Australia in the General Division.

== Private life and legacy ==
A conservative and closeted gay man until the 1950s Horton lived more openly after that. He met Lenwood Morris, a dancer with the Katherine Dunham black American company, and he was his first regular male lover. A generous host, Horton gave lavish parties at his Palm Beach weekender and his home at Potts Point. For over a decade he lived at Potts Point with the antique dealer Christopher Davis. Over many years Horton travelled internationally with his friend James Fairfax. He died of liver cancer survived by his mother who died in her 100th year seven months later. Raised in the Baptist Church and educated at a Methodist school Horton planned his own High Anglican funeral service at Christ Church St Laurence. His ashes are scattered in the dog cemetery at James Fairfax’s Bowral estate at Retford Park.

On his death, one-fifth of the residue of the estate went to two daughters of Christopher Davis, another fifth to two cousins, and the remaining three-fifths to the National Trust and the Art Gallery of New South Wales. The doyen of the Sydney art world for thirty years as a writer, collector, patron and philanthropist, the Mervyn Horton Bequest had in 2006 purchased over $8 million of contemporary art for the AGNSW. His papers are held by the National Library of Australia. It was a condition of Horton's bequest to the Art Gallery of New South Wales that it display annually a painting of himself by Australian artist, Bryan Westwood. The gallery has not observed this condition. During the Centenary of the Old Newingtonians Union an exhibition of portraits of Old Newingtonians was held at Parliament House, Sydney, and a small head and shoulders portrait of Horton by Westwood was hung.

== Publications ==
- Present Day Art in Australia (1969)
- Australian Painters of the '70s (1975)
