= William Moore (critic) =

Australian theatre and art critic

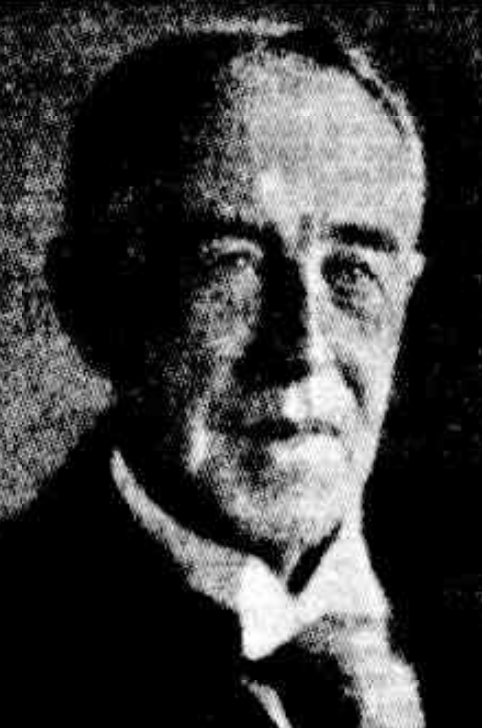
William George Moore (1868–1937), Australian drama and art critic

William George Moore (11 June 1868 – 6 November 1937) was an Australian theatre and art critic. Moore was born at Sandhurst (now Bendigo, Victoria). In 1923 Moore married Madame Hamelius. He died at Sydney on 6 November 1937. Mrs Moore survived him, and died in 1953.
