= Ivor Francis (painter) =

Australian painter and critic

Ivor Pengelly Francis AM (13 March 1906 – 6 November 1993) was an artist, one of Australia's newspaper art critics, and a teacher in South Australia. He has been called South Australia's premier surrealist painter.

== Biography ==
Ivor Francis was born in Uckfield, England and emigrated to South Australia on the Moreton Bay in 1924 as a Barwell scheme "apprentice farm boy", and went to work at Oolooloo station at Elliston on Eyre Peninsula.

He joined the Adelaide Teachers College in 1925 and on qualifying started teaching at Jamestown in 1929, then Prospect, South Australia from 1930. He took classes part-time at the School of Arts and Crafts 1928–1940, where he developed a long-term friendship with fellow-artist Mary Packer Harris (no relation to Max Harris). He contributed to the art scene in Adelaide by letters to the newspapers and lectures at the Art Gallery.

Francis was one of a group of young artists, which included Ruth Tuck, Shirley Adams, Dave Dallwitz and Douglas Roberts, who in 1942 held the Royal South Australian Society of Arts' first exhibition of modernist art. From 1944 to 1947 he taught art subjects at Adelaide Technical High School, then from 1948 to 1968 he worked for the ABC Radio as supervisor of Education programmes.

He was an inaugural committee member of South Australian branch of the Contemporary Art Society being promoted by Max Harris, and in 1944 became chairman. He was art critic for The News from 1944 to 1956.

Although known for his abstract and surrealist paintings, his landscapes were also well received.

Francis was made a Member of the Order of Australia (AM) in the 1989 Australia Day Honours for "service to art as a painter, critic and teacher".

== Family ==
He married Ethel Saunders of Jamestown on 21 January 1931; they lived at 5 Labrina Avenue, Prospect until around 1950, when they moved to a home in Picadilly Road, Crafers, where he died. They had no children.
