= James Smith (journalist) =

English-born Australian journalist and encyclopedist

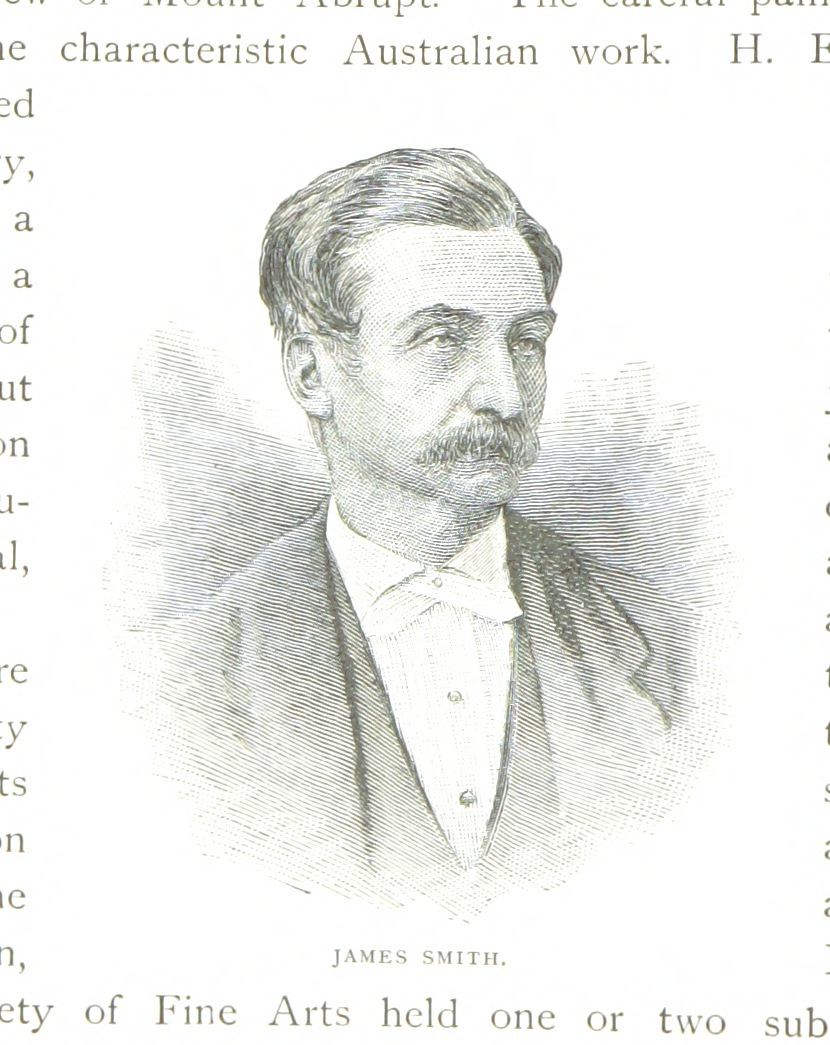
An 1888 illustration of Smith

James Smith (28 April 1820 – 19 March 1910) was an English-born Australian journalist and encyclopedist, leader-writer and drama critic for the Melbourne Age.

== Early life ==
Smith was born at Loose near Maidstone, Kent, England, son of James Smith, supervisor of inland revenue, and his wife Mary. Between 1848 and 1854 he was the editor of the Salisbury and Winchester Journal.

== Career in Australia ==
He helped found the Melbourne Shakespeare Society in 1884 and Melbourne chapters of the Garrick Club in 1855, Alliance Française in 1890 and the Dante Society in 1896. Smith was the first to suggest the foundation of a National Gallery; his influence on Melbourne art was great as trustee of the Public Library, Museums and National Gallery of Victoria (1880–1910) and treasurer of the trustees from 1888. As a drama critic Smith was productive and able, although not as experienced or competent as fellow critic James Edward Neild. Smith helped Louis Buvelot to gain recognition as an artist, and his favourable review of the work of the then unknown Tom Roberts in 1881 showed his ability to recognize potential talent.

Smith died of cystitis at Hawthorn in Melbourne on 19 March 1910 and was buried in the Boroondara General Cemetery. He married twice and was survived by two sons and three daughters from his second marriage.
