= Mary Eagle =

Australian art critic, curator and art historian

Mary Eagle is an Australian art critic, curator and art historian, the author of books, articles and papers on Australian art and artists.

== Early life and education ==
Eagle was born in Bairnsdale, Victoria in 1944. In her late 20s she took a Bachelor of Arts double degree in History and Fine Arts in 1975 at the University of Melbourne where the ethnographic teaching of University of Melbourne historian Greg Dening was formative in her ideas. There also, she researched the George Bell school for an Honours degree from which The George Bell School: students, friends, influences was published in 1981.

== Historiographical researcher ==
Eagle's research, beyond her biographies of artists, promotes the decolonising art historical narratives, especially through her interest in art of Asia, the Australian First Nations, and in women in art. Montana notes her 1987 article in the Australian Journal of Art her observation of "the lack of value given to the Japanese fine arts in colonial Australia," and supports her claim that Japanese art during our period was commonly regarded as 'mere' decorative art.

Eagle's PhD thesis was awarded by the Australian National University in 2005; her A history of Australian art 1830-1930: told through the lives of the objects, was humanist in focus and history-based. It dealt with visual representations by Indigenous Australians and European-Australians of sequential themes,' to the present, 'of land-claims, cultural allegiance, and cultural reformation.' The abstract explains that the study incorporates:

...a multiplicity of human perspectives; the obverse of a history based on the operation of abstract forces. [...] Traditionally, the histories of Australian art have been divided by taxonomies of race and civilisation. Without doubt the division had effect in the past assessment of art however there was every reason why it should not govern a revised history. The context for re-imagining the past is that, in our own time, the Aboriginal people's capacity for cross-cultural expression, via a dialogical mode, has earned their art a prominent place in contemporary art world-wide. Rather than writing theoretically, the solution was to build an alternative history on the basics, on specific information about objects and the contexts of their production. The fate of the objects subsequently - the collecting of them, and their periodic assessment over time, became a means of incorporating the explanations of art history and anthropology without having to endorse the viewpoint of either. [...] Aboriginal art was observed to take a dialogical mode from early on, whereas art in the western mode has only recently - under globalisation- shown signs of a comparable self-objectification leading (possibly) to a dialogic.

Daniel Thomas, taking issue with the notion that "Aboriginal art has been absent from Australian art histories" cites Eagle's tracing in her PhD thesis of the inclusion of Aboriginal bark paintings in international Expos in the 1850s and the drawings "by an Aboriginal artist" (Wiliam Barak) lent to the 1854 Melbourne Intercolonial and the 1855 Paris Exposition Universelle, and Aboriginal material as a routine Australian contribution to international Expos, including the 1939 New York World Fair in the twentieth century.

== Professional appointments ==
=== Critic ===
During 1977-1980, Eagle was art critic on The Age newspaper. She soon started to concentrate on more scholarly research; Duggins recognises Eagle’s early 1978 collaborative essay 'Modernism in Sydney in the 1920s' as contributing novel insights into the influence of the applied arts, through a growing consumer market and growing popular print media readership, on the development of modernist painting in Australia.

=== Curator ===
For eighteen years, Eagle was a curator at the National Gallery of Australia, and was its Head of Australian Art 1982–1996. In 1991 Mary was appointed judge for the 1992 Moet & Chandon Art Fellowship.

=== Scholar ===
Eagle's scholarship and curatorship and her work from 1997 as Visiting Fellow at the Australian National University’s Centre for Cross-Cultural Research and Humanities Research Centre has continued the early influence of Dening.

== Book publications ==
- Eagle, Mary; National Gallery of Australia (1980). Between the bush and the boudoir : a National Gallery of Australia travelling exhibition. The Gallery.
- Eagle, Mary; Minchin, Jan (1981). The George Bell School : students, friends, influences (Edition of 1000 numbered copies ed.). Sydney: Deutscher Art and Resolution Press. ISBN 978-0-908180-05-9.
- Gascoigne, Rosalie; Eagle, Mary; University Fine Arts Gallery (University of Tasmania) (1985). Rosalie Gascoigne, 1985. University of Tasmania. ISBN 978-0-85901-289-8.
- Eagle, Mary; Butler, Roger; Bunny, Rupert; Australian National Gallery (1986). Rupert Bunny's mythologies at the Australian National Gallery : Gallery 4A, 7 June to 16 November 1986. Canberra: The Gallery.
- Bond Corporation (sponsoring body.); de Bussy, Diana; Desmond, Michael; Eagle, Mary; Lloyd, Michael (1989). Irises and five masterpieces : Australian National Gallery, Canberra, 29 June-9 July 1989 : Art Gallery of New South Wales, Sydney, 14 July-23 July 1989 : Queensland Art Gallery, Brisbane, 28 July-6 August 1989 : National Gallery of Victoria, Melbourne, 11 August-20 August 1989 : Art Gallery of Western Australia, Perth, 25 August-3 September 1989. Bond Corporation. ISBN 978-0-9598384-1-1.
- Eagle, Mary; Phipps, Jennifer (1990). Australian modern painting between the wars 1914-1939. Bay Books. ISBN 978-1-86256-261-5.
- Tillers, Imants; Eagle; Mary; Deutscher Brunswick Street (issuing body.) (1990). Imants Tillers : poem of ecstasy. Melbourne: Deutscher Brunswick Street. ISBN 978-0-908180-17-2.
- Eagle, Mary; Bunny, Rupert; Australian National Gallery (1991). The art of Rupert Bunny in the Australian National Gallery. Australian National Gallery. ISBN 978-0-642-13073-0.
- Dowse, Barbara; Watkins, Dick; Eagle, Mary; National Gallery of Australia (1992). Dick Watkins in context : an exhibition from the collection of the National Gallery. 1993, 15 January -15 July. Department of Australian Art, National Gallery of Australia. ISBN 978-0-642-18865-6.
- Eagle, Mary; Nan Kivell, Rex; Roberts, Tom; National Library of Australia; Australian National Gallery (1992). Documentary history of the acquisition and custodianship of the painting Bourke Street and the Nan Kivell Collection. Australian National Gallery.
- Eagle, Mary; National Gallery of Australia (1997). The oil paintings of Charles Conder in the National Gallery of Australia. National Gallery of Australia. ISBN 978-0-642-13054-9.
- Eagle, Mary; Middlemost, Tom; Charles Sturt University Art Collection (1998). Landscape. Charles Sturt University Art Collection. ISBN 978-1-86467-026-4.
- Eagle, Mary; Ramsey, Ron (1994). Arthur Streeton : selected works from the National Collection. National Gallery of Australia.
- Eagle, Mary (1994). Virtual reality: National Gallery of Australia. National Gallery of Australia.
- Eagle, Mary; Jones, John James; ICI Australia (1994). A story of Australian painting. Macmillan Australia. ISBN 978-0-7329-0778-5.
- Eagle, Mary; National Gallery of Australia (1997). The oil paintings of Tom Roberts in the National Gallery of Australia. National Gallery of Australia. ISBN 978-0-642-13087-7.
- Eagle, Mary; Dobell, William (1999). A tribute to William Dobell : the Australian National University, Drill Hall Gallery, 3 September-3 October 1999. Canberra: Australian National University, Drill Hall Gallery. ISBN 978-0-7315-2834-9.
- Eagle, Mary; Purves-Smith, Peter (2000). Peter Purves-Smith : a painter in peace and war. The Beagle Press. ISBN 978-0-947349-32-5.
- Eagle, Mary; Gascoigne, Rosalie; Drill Hall Gallery (2000). From the studio of Rosalie Gascoigne : the Australian National University, Drill Hall Gallery, 5 September-8 October 2000. Sydney: Drill Hall Gallery. ISBN 978-0-7315-2830-1.
- Thwaites, Vivonne; Eagle, Mary; Radok, Stephanie (2001). Home is where the heart is : an exhibition of contemporary works by national and South Australian-based artists and craftspeople and a collection of work by South Australian Country Women's Association members which examines attitudes of 'belonging' in Australia. South Australian Country Women's Association. ISBN 978-0-9595800-6-8.
- Fuller, Helen; Best, Robin; Thwaites, Vivonne; Eagle, Mary (2006). Writing a painting : March 2006. University of South Australia. ISBN 978-0-646-45157-2.
- Eagle, Mary; Drill Hall Gallery; Australian National University (2007). Three creative fellows : Sidney Nolan, Arthur Boyd, Narritjin Maymuru : Drill Hall Gallery 9 August - 16 September 2007. Australian National University. ISBN 978-0-9581560-6-6.
- Eagle, Mary (2024). Dick Watkins : reshaping art and life. Australian National University Press. ISBN 978-1-76046-622-0.
