= Brian Seidel =

Australian artist (1928–2019)

Brian Seidel (30 August 1928 – 17 April 2019) was a post-war South Australian painter, print-maker and teacher. His artworks are held by the National Gallery of Australia, Art Gallery of NSW, Art Gallery of SA, Art Gallery of WA, National Gallery of Victoria, Queensland Art Gallery, Tasmanian Museum and Art Gallery, Queen Victoria Museum and Art Gallery, Parliament House, Art Bank as well as in regional and tertiary gallery collections.

== Early life ==
Brian Edwin Seidel was born in Rose Park, South Australia, the eldest son of Edwin Karl "Ed" Seidel (1899–1972) and his wife Thora Dotheen Seidel, née Clisby (1905–1977), who married in 1927. Ed and Thora Seidel had two sons Brian Edwin and John Fraser. Edwin Karl Seidel was of German heritage and his grandfather Johan Christian Seidel arrived in South Australia aboard British Emperor.

== Education ==
Brian Seidel attended Adelaide High School and then the Goodwood Technical School where the art teacher Jeffery Smart was an early influence on the young Seidel and he became a life-long friend. At the time Smart ran en-plein air painting sessions on Saturday mornings that Brian Seidel attended. Jeffrey Smart was probably responsible for Seidel’s artwork “Station at Snowtown” being exhibited at the Royal South Australian Society of Arts Autumn exhibition in April 1945. Brian Seidel became a member of the Contemporary Art Society (CAS) in 1946 and he exhibited two pencil drawings at the fourth CAS exhibition at the Institute Building in July 1946. Ivor Francis in his review of the RSASA Autumn 1947 exhibition suggested that “Jeff Smart…Louis James and Brian Seidel are on the way to founding a strong socio-realist group of painters in Adelaide".

Seidel then trained at the Adelaide Teachers College and later the South Australian School of Art (from 1947) where Ivor Hele (later Sir Ivor Hele) was teaching. In May 1947 Brian Seidel won second prize for an oil painting in the first University student art exhibition and he exhibited two works at the 1948 University Student’s Art Exhibition. He received the Teachers' Certificate in 1951 and a Diploma of Art from SA School of Art 1956. He undertook further training at the University of Iowa and Slade School of Art. He taught in Adelaide for many years, including as a tutor at Flinders University.

He was art critic for the Adelaide News 1963–1966, and was involved with numerous stage performances in Adelaide between the years 1950 and 1970 as stage designer, from revue to opera. In 1971 he took a position at the Preston Institute of Technology in Victoria.

He held various one-man exhibitions in Adelaide, including several in conjunction with the Adelaide Festival of Arts 1966 and 1972. He won various prizes, including a Fulbright Scholarship in 1961.

The Art Gallery of South Australia holds several examples of his work.

No records have been found to connect him with the South Australian painter Nola Annette Seidel (22 October 1940 – 17 February 2019)
