= Gerald Marr Thompson =

Gerald Marr Thompson (11 September 1856 – 28 February 1938), commonly referred to as Marr Thompson, was an Australian journalist — art, music, and drama critic for the Sydney Morning Herald for nearly 35 years.

== History ==
Thompson was born in London, youngest son of solicitor John Thompson and Emma Thompson, née Hitchcock, and was educated at London University College. Following his brothers, both medical doctors, he emigrated to Australia in 1881, settling in Adelaide, where he was employed with the Bank of Australasia, while submitting regular music and drama critiques to The Advertiser. He moved to Sydney in 1883, becoming the art, drama and music critic for the Daily Telegraph.

He was the Herald's third drama and music critic, succeeding Sir Gilbert Parker 1886–1888 and Austin Brereton 1888–1891, holding the position July 1891 – 1925.

== Family ==
On 7 April 1887 he married Eleanor Lucy Cole. She died in July 1927, and he married again, in December 1932 to Mathilde Pognon. They had a home in Double Bay.

His siblings included John Ashburton Thompson, of the NSW Board of Health.
