= Tony Tuckson =

British painter

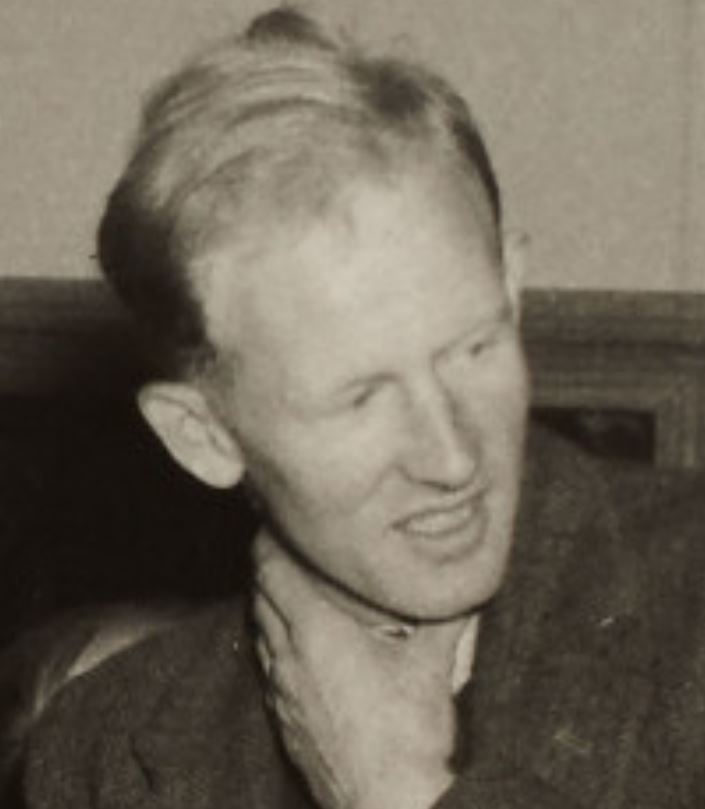
- Born: 18 January 1921; Port Said, Egypt
- Died: 24 November 1973 (aged 52); Sydney, New South Wales, Australia
- Known for: Painting

John Anthony Tuckson (18 January 1921 at Port Said, Egypt – 24 November 1973 at Wahroonga, Australia), was an Abstract Expressionist artist, an art gallery director and previously a war-time Spitfire pilot. He died of cancer.

== Education ==
The second child of William Tuckson, a Suez Canal pilot and amateur artist, and his wife Eléonore, née Pegler, Tuckson was educated in England at Gresham's School, Holt, Norfolk, Christ's College, Finchley, London, the Hornsey School of Art, London, and the Kingston School of Art.

After the Second World War, he studied in Australia at the East Sydney Technical College for three years, graduating in December 1949.

== Service career ==
Tuckson served in the Royal Air Force from 10 June 1940 until 10 August 1946, training as a pilot at Edmonton, Alberta, Canada. He then flew Spitfires over Britain and Europe, in 1941 was commissioned, and in August 1942 was sent to Darwin, Australia, where he saw action against the Japanese.

He was later a flying instructor in Wirraway aircraft and was demobilized from the RAF with the rank of flight lieutenant on 10 August 1946 in Sydney.

== Administrator ==
Tuckson was appointed assistant director of the Art Gallery of New South Wales in October 1950, and deputy director in 1957. He visited Melville Island and Arnhem Land to collect work for the National Art Gallery. He mounted a touring exhibition of Aboriginal bark paintings, carvings, and other work, resulting in Berndt's book Australian Aboriginal Art (1964), and the major Melanesian Art exhibition in 1966. The nineteenth-century gallery was redesigned, largely Tuckson's achievement, as The Art Gallery of New South Wales (1972).

== Work and exhibitions ==
Tuckson admired the work of Picasso, Matisse, Klee and Cézanne, and in 1949 was greatly influenced by R. M. Berndt's collection of Aboriginal art from Arnhem Land.

He began exhibiting his own paintings with the Society of Artists and the Contemporary Art Society of Australia, but between 1954 and 1962, he exhibited only nine paintings.

Until 1958 he was a School of Paris painter of figures, heads, still lifes and interiors. However, his later paintings were abstracts, and he was quickly recognised as one of Australia's few superlative abstract expressionists. His work has been compared favourably with that of Jackson Pollock.

His first solo exhibition was at Watters Gallery, Sydney, in 1972, presenting 64 paintings, most from the period 1958 to 1965. A further exhibition of 22 new works took place in 1973. The Association of Galleries of New South Wales held a memorial exhibition of his work in 1976.

An exhibition with the title Tuckson: Themes and Variations was mounted by Terence Maloon in Melbourne in 1989, and several of his paintings are now on permanent display at the National Gallery of Australia.

== Family ==
Tuckson married Dorothea Margaret Bisset (now Margaret Tuckson), a former design student, in Turramurra, Sydney, in 1943. They had one son. Both his wife and his son have appeared in some of his paintings.

== See also ==
- Australian art

== Select bibliography ==
- Art and the Western World, by Anthony Tuckson, in Australian Aboriginal Art ed. Ronald M. Berndt (Sydney: Ure Smith, 1964)
- Dreamings, ed. Peter Sutton (Melbourne, 1988)
- Tuckson (video, Sydney, 1988)
- Tony Tuckson, by Daniel Thomas, Renee Free and Geoffrey Legge, (Sydney, 1989)
- Tony Tuckson – Themes and variations (exhibition catalogue) by Terence Maloon (Melbourne: Heide Park and Art Gallery, 1989)
- Drawings of Tony Tuckson, by Richard McMillan (thesis, University of New South Wales, 1997)
- Guide to the Papers of Tony Tuckson (1921-1973) by Stephen Rainbird and others (Archive of the Art Gallery of New South Wales, Sydney, 1999)
- Tuckson and Tradition, Painting Forever, by Terence Maloon (Canberra: National Gallery of Australia, 2000)

== Other Sources and References ==
- Tony Tuckson at Australian Dictionary of Biography
