= Daniel Thomas (art historian) =

Australian art historian, curator, writer, and museum director

Daniel Rhys Thomas
- Born: 1 May 1931; Latrobe, Tasmania, Australia
- Occupations: Art critic and historian

Daniel Rhys Thomas AM (born 1931) is an Australian art historian, curator, writer, art critic, and museum director.

== Early life and education ==
Daniel Thomas was born in Latrobe, near Devonport, Tasmania on 1 May 1931, and at age eight his letter was published the 'Piccaninnies Pages' children's section of the Australian Woman's Mirror. He moved to the mainland and was educated` at Geelong Grammar School, where he was taught by Ludwig Hirschfeld-Mack, a Bauhaus artist who came to Australia as an 'alien' immigrant on the Dunera. He remembered his teacher in the Winter 1993 issue of Art and Australia:

The serene, quiet man – so fair that he glowed with the pale radiance of saints in stained glass windows – passed to and fro. One day I was looking at a book about Paul Klee. Hirschfeld noticed, and volunteered that he had known, and worked, with Klee, and with Kandinsky, whom I knew to be another modern master. I was electrified. Suddenly to see the stylistic connection between Klee’s art, illustrated in books, and Hirschfeld-Mack’s own framed watercolour hanging by the door to his flat was a first flash of art history, of the flow of forms and ideas through time and place.

During his childhood, Thomas visited Central Australia where he encountered First Nations art and met watercolorist Albert Namatjira. Following his secondary education, in 1952 Thomas moved to England and studied modern history at Oxford University, graduating in 1956. This historical training, rather than formal art historical studies, provided the foundation for his subsequent career in art curation and administration.

== Professional career ==
In 1958, Thomas was appointed as a curatorial assistant at the Art Gallery of New South Wales, his appointment coinciding with the gallery removing "National" from its name. Thomas later noted that during this period, the Art Gallery of NSW faced practical challenges including infrastructure issues and collection limitations compared to other state galleries.

Thomas progressed within the institution, as Assistant to the Director, and Senior Curator and eventually being appointed Curator of Australian Art. An early example of his art journalism, a biography of Lionel Lindsay, appeared in Hemisphere: An Asian-Australian Magazine. In 1966 he visited America on a 9 month Winston Churchill Memorial Trust Fellowship to study modern art there, meeting Clement Meadmore, and visited museums in Russia, England, and Scandinavia, leading to the staging of a touring exhibition Two Decades of American Painting 1945-1965, at the Art Gallery of New South Wales 26 July–9 August 1967. Thomas, who was then an art critic on the Sydney Morning Herald, enthusiastically promoted the show, which is credited with having introduced Australian audiences to geometric abstraction and Abstract Expressionism and as Green notes:

Two Decades was more the result of the cosmopolitanism of three internationalist individuals: the director of the NGV, Eric Westbrook; his exhibitions officer, John Stringer; and Daniel Thomas, an energetic young curator at the AGNSW. Without their cosmopolitanism, wide reading and peripatetic travel, this exhibition would not have been seen: they operated within a web of international contacts. A key intermediary was the Australian expatriate sculptor, the urbane Clement Meadmore, who had moved to New York in 1963.

During his tenure in 1972, Thomas organised the Art Gallery of New South Wales' First International Conducted Tour, to art galleries and collections in the United States, initiated the photography collection for which Gael Newton was appointed as the foundation curator in 1974, and in 1975 his curatorship of The Australian Landscape 1802-1975 led to a cultural exchange when it toured to China: "we have rewritten the history of Australian landscape in this exhibition," he was reported as saying. His Outlines of Australian Art: The Joseph Brown Collection was released in 1973 and when in 1982 Richard Haese reviewed its second edition in Art and Australia he questioned:

Is it possible to write the history of a nation's art through a private collection? Such was Daniel Thomas's problematic task as he set out to reconstruct the history of Australian art through the personal choices of a collector. Few art historians could be so well prepared for the job [...] Mr Thomas has, over the past years, done much to shape Australian art history; his work on Tuckson and Strachan, Cossington Smith and the impressive introduction to Candice Bruce's catalogue of von Guérard, to mention only a fraction of his writing, are unsurpassed. Watertight scholarship and meticulous attention to detail are stamped on everything he has done as Curator of Australian Art at the Art Gallery of New South Wales and now at the Australian National Gallery. Equal to his research has been his ability to identify neglected patches of Australian art and simultaneously to encourage young artist.

In 1978, Thomas served as Commissioner for the Australian exhibit at the Venice Biennale under its new president Giuseppe Galasso. That same year, Thomas moved to Canberra to become the inaugural Senior Curator of Australian Art at the newly built National Gallery of Australia, for which he had earlier been a favourite as a possible director. In this position, he helped develop the gallery's collection and exhibition strategy for Australian art.

Thomas was appointed Director of the Art Gallery of South Australia in August 1984, a position he held until 1990. Following his retirement, he returned to Tasmania where he has continued to write occasionally on Australian art.

Throughout his career, Thomas mentored younger curators and scholars, including Gael Newton, Mary Eagle, Ron Radford, Helen Maxwell, and Ian North. His approach to documenting and presenting Australian art has informed collection development and exhibition practices at several institutions.

== Curatorial ethos ==
Thomas emphasized materiality and context as leading to a comprehensive understanding of artworks, and so encouraged his curators to conduct fieldwork, at locations where artworks were created. When arranging the first display at the National Gallery in Canberra in 1982, Thomas placed Margaret Preston's work alongside Arnhem Land bark paintings, identifying formal and conceptual connections between these different artistic traditions and recognizing Preston's own admiration for the indigenous art forms as truly 'Australian'. He also contributed to the 1988 Bicentennial Year traveling exhibition Creating Australia, which presented Australian art to broad audiences.

Thomas was catholic in his research: he drew significant attention to previously neglected or underrated Australian women artists, including Grace Crowley and Grace Cossington Smith; reassessed historical perspectives on early European artists in Australia, including John Glover, Conrad Martens, Eugene von Guérard, and William C. Piguenit and their interpretations of the Australian landscape; and did not neglect the decorative arts, producing for Art and Australia in 1972 a comprehensive survey of Art Deco in Australia.

In his scholarly work, Thomas provided historical context for institutional approaches to Aboriginal art, examining collection histories and exhibition practices across Australian museums.

In 2019, the Art Gallery of New South Wales published Recent Past: Writing Australian Art, a collection of Thomas's essays spanning 1958 to 2020. Edited by Hannah Fink and Steven Miller, this publication includes both his original writings and later reflections, with 2020 commentary that contextualizes his earlier work. The book includes a complete bibliography of his writings across more than six decades.

== Critic ==
During his tenure as a curator at the AGNSW Thomas served as an art critic for Sydney newspapers the Sunday Telegraph 1962–66 and 1968–69; The Sydney Morning Herald 1970-75; and The Bulletin 1976–77, writing with factual precision to support his contextual analysis, rendering art historical content accessible to general readers. He was consulted on a number of art-related stories, including an episode when vice-squad police seized a poster of Michelangelo's David and Aubrey Beardsley reproductions from a bookshop, commenting that "It is incredible, utterly ridiculous, that a photograph of one of the greatest works of art in the world should be seized as an obscene publication. The statue of David has been standing in an art gallery in Florence, Italy, for more than 500 years – and this is Sydney 1969." Of the controversy surrounding the purchase of Jackson Pollock's Blue Poles for $A1.3 million, he enthused that it was "the greatest thing that has happened to art in Australia".

== Recognition ==
Thomas was called upon for his expertise for such tasks as judging art prizes, for the Geelong Art Gallery for example when for the Corio 5 Star Whisky Prize he selected Sandra Leveson, and he served on the advisory panel of the nation's major art journal Art and Australia. He received formal recognition for his work in 1986 when he was made a Member of the Order of Australia (AM). He served as an inaugural board member of the National Portrait Gallery, participating in its early development.

He was appointed to the Visual Arts Board of the Australia Council and the Commonwealth's Heritage Collections Committee.

== Later years ==
In 1990, Thomas retired to live at Port Sorell, Tasmania. He has maintained connections with the art world through consultation, as for the opening exhibition of the newly founded National Portrait Gallery in 1994, and occasional writing on Australian art topics. His collected essays in Recent Past document his contributions to art historical scholarship amidst changes in Australian art historiography; Thomas's career coincided with significant developments in Australian museum practice, including increased professionalization of curatorial roles, greater attention to First Nations and women in Australian art history, and evolving approaches to presenting diverse artistic traditions.

== Publications ==
- Thomas, Daniel (1962). Pre-Raphaelite art : paintings, drawings, engravings, sculpture, tapestries, chintzes, wallpapers : an exhibition. State Art Galleries of Australia.
- Turnbull, Clive; Campbell, Jean; Thomas, Daniel (1962). Antipodean Vision : Australian painting: colonial, impressionist, and contemporary. F.W. Cheshire Publishing Pty. Ltd.
- Turnbull, Clive; Thomas, Daniel; Young, Elizabeth; Commonwealth Art Advisory Board (Australia); Tate Gallery; National Gallery of Canada (1962). Australian painting, colonial, impressionist, contemporary. Griffin Press.
- Dupain, Max; Herman, Morton Earle; National Trust of Australia (New South Wales). Women's Committee; Thomas, Daniel; Herman, Morton; Barnard, Marjorie (1963). Georgian architecture in Australia with some examples of buildings of the post-Georgian period. Ure Smith.
- Thomas, Daniel; Art Gallery of New South Wales; National Gallery of South Australia (1963). Australian print survey 1963/4. [Art Gallery of N.S.W.].
- Thomas, Daniel; Clune Galleries (1967). Conrad Martens, 1801-1878. Clune Galleries.
- Thomas, Daniel (1969). "Introduction". In Horton, Mervyn (ed.). Present day art in Australia. Ure Smith.
- Thomas, Daniel (1971). Sali Herman. Collins. ISBN 978-0-00-211424-0.
- Lindsay, Norman; Stewart, Douglas, 1913-1985; Thomas, Daniel, 1931- (1973). Two hundred etchings. Angus & Robertson. ISBN 978-0-207-12717-5.
- Thomas, Daniel (1973). Outlines of Australian Art The Joseph Brown Collection (Hardcover ed.). Harry N Abrams. ISBN 978-0-8109-1429-2.
- Thomas, Daniel; Art Gallery of New South Wales (1975). Grace Crowley, 10 May - 8 June 1975. Art Gallery of New South Wales.
- Thomas, Daniel (1975). The Australian landscape, 1802-1975 : a cultural exchange exhibition with China. Art Gallery of New South Wales.
- McCullough, Tom; Thomas, Daniel; Nicolson, Harry (1976). Three views on the 1976 Biennale : recent international forms in art. Art Gallery of N.S.W. ISBN 978-0-7240-1422-4.
- Thomas, Daniel (1976). Tony Tuckson 1921-1973. Art Gallery of New South Wales.
- Thomas, Daniel; Nolan, Sidney; Australian National Gallery (1981). Australian National Gallery : Sidney Nolan : the Ned Kelly paintings 1946-47 : some attempts to resolve confusion.
- Thomas, Daniel; Smith, Grace Cossington, 1892-1984; National Gallery of Australia (1993). Grace Cossington Smith : a life : from drawings in the collection of the National Gallery of Australia. The Gallery. ISBN 978-0-642-13019-8.
- Thomas, Daniel; Radford, Ron; Astbury, Leigh; Art Gallery of South Australia (1988). Creating Australia 200 years of art, 1788-1988. International Cultural Corporation of Australia. ISBN 978-0-642-13433-2.
- Thomas, Daniel; Darling, James; SALA Festival (Adelaide, S.A.) (2001). James Darling : instinct, imagination, physical work. Wakefield Press. ISBN 978-1-86254-568-7.
- Gray, Anne; Butler, Roger; Hart, Deborah; McQueen, Humphrey; Newton, Gael; Thomas, Daniel; Varcoe-Cocks, Michael; Vaughan, Gerard; Wise, David John (2015). Tom Roberts. National Gallery of Australia. ISBN 978-0-642-33459-6.
- Thomas, Daniel (2020). Fink, Hannah; MIller, Stephen (eds.). Recent past : writing Australian art (Revised ed.). Art Gallery of New South Wales. ISBN 978-1-74174-150-6.
