= James Gleeson =

Australian artist (1915–2008)

James Gleeson AO
- Born: James Timothy Gleeson; 21 November 1915; Hornsby, New South Wales, Australia
- Died: 20 October 2008 (aged 92); Sydney, New South Wales, Australia
- Education: East Sydney Technical College, Sydney Teachers College
- Known for: Painting, Poetry, Writing
- Movement: Surrealism

James Timothy Gleeson AO (21 November 1915 – 20 October 2008) was an Australian artist. He served on the board of the National Gallery of Australia.

== Early life ==
Gleeson was born in the Hornsby in 1915 and attended East Sydney Technical College from 1934 to 1936.

Gleeson's family owned the hotel at the Central Coast NSW town of Gosford and the cool room was sometimes used as a makeshift morgue. During his teacher education, Gleeson was exposed to the works of Salvador Dalí, Max Ernst, André Masson, Sigmund Freud and Carl Jung who were to become major influences in Gleeson's phantasmogoric work. One of his teachers was May Marsden who persuaded him to switch from poetry to art to explore his hatred of fascism as the war came to Australia.

== Work ==
Gleeson worked with Robert Klippel in his early years. In 1944 Gleeson created Millet-influenced work The sower referencing Jean-François Millet's 1850 painting of the same title. Rather than showing a landscape with a conglomerate main figure, Gleeson presents an daliesque mindscape. Gleeson's later work featured the male nude, as a gay artist he was a rarity in the middle of the twentieth century. His work had homoerotic suggestions and was not as sexualised as his contemporary, the gay artist, Tom of Finland.

Since the 1970s Gleeson generally made large scale paintings in that have been described as inscape genre. The works outwardly resemble rocky seascapes turning into strange biomorphic forms. Gleeson's phantasmagoria referred to the artists mindscape and sometimes a self-portrait would pop out from the morass of muscular male nudes and weird forms under a stormy sky.

In the late 1970s, Gleeson interviewed 98 Australian artists in their studios, about their work being acquired by the National Gallery. Gleeson was considered 'softer' than most Australian newspaper art critics, although his dossiers of significant Australian artist proved to be more discriminating.

In 2008, the James Gleeson Oral History Collection's significance was recognised by it being inscribed into the UNESCO Australian Memory of the World Register. The inscription was announced at the program's conference, Communities and Memories: A Global Perspective in Canberra.

His retrospective in 2004–2005, Beyond the Screen of Sight, included 120 paintings and was exhibited in Melbourne and Canberra. The Art Gallery of New South Wales exhibited Gleeson's drawings for paintings in 2003 and The Ubu diptych in 2005 to celebrate Gleeson's 90th birthday. The Ubu diptych is regarded as one of his greatest.

In September 2007, the largest collection of Australian surrealism ever collected was donated to the National Gallery of Australia by Ray Wilson. The collection included various works by James Gleeson.

== Death ==
Gleeson died in Sydney on 20 October 2008, aged 92. His life partner Frank O'Keefe died in 2007.

== See also ==
- Art of Australia
