= Nancy Borlase =

Australian artist (1914–2006)

Nancy Borlase AM
- Born: Nancy Wilmot Borlase; 24 March 1914; Taihape, New Zealand
- Died: 11 September 2006 (aged 92); Sydney, Australia
- Education: East Sydney Technical College
- Known for: Painter, art critic
- Movement: Abstract impressionism
- Spouse: Laurie Short (m. 1941)

Nancy Wilmot Borlase AM (24 March 1914 – 11 September 2006) was a New Zealand-born Australian artist, known for her landscape-based abstract paintings and portraits, and as an art critic and commentator. Her work is displayed in the National Gallery of Australia and other major galleries.

== Biography ==
Born in Taihape, New Zealand, in 1914, Borlase was 16, when she decided that art was her calling and shifted to Christchurch, where she studied at Canterbury College School of Art under Francis Shurrock.

Borlase moved to Australia in 1937, at age 22, where she studied life drawing and sculpture at East Sydney Technical College under Frank Medworth and Lyndon Dadswell (1937–1940) and also life drawing under Rah Fizelle and Grace Crowley before switching to painting. In 1939, she joined the Contemporary Art Society, NSW branch and was an active committee member of the Society between 1952 and 1970.

She lived for a while next to Sidney Nolan in Melbourne, was befriended by his benefactor John Reed, and worked as an artist's model. She married trade union figure Laurie Short in 1941.

Borlase started as a figurative painter before moving to abstract impressionism. Her work was influenced by a study tour to New York in 1956, where she encountered Jackson Pollock, Willem de Kooning and Mark Rothko. Other study tours included tours to the USA 1960; Europe 1956, 1969, 1972, 1973; China 1976 (as one of three art writers).

She worked as an art critic for periodicals The Bulletin, Sydney between 1972 and 1973, and the Sydney Morning Herald from 1973.

== Awards and recognition ==
- 1987 – Member of the Order of Australia in recognition of her service to art
- 2000 – Winner of the Portia Geach Memorial Award
