= Jeffrey Makin =

Australian artist (b.1943)

- Born: 1943 (age 82–83); Wagga Wagga, New South Wales, Australia
- Education: National Art School
- Known for: Landscape painting

Jeffrey Thomas Makin (born 1943) is an Australian artist, art critic, and director of Port Jackson Press Australia. He is best known for his paintings en plein air of the Australian landscape.

== Early life and education ==
Makin was born in 1943 in the city of Wagga Wagga, New South Wales. Son to father Frederick Campbell Makin and mother Mary Makin (née Lanyon), his affiliation with art and painting began at an early age. Makin was given a set of pastels from his grandmother and told they had belonged to a family relative, supposedly descended from the renowned English portrait painter, Sir Joshua Reynolds.

Encouraged by his father and his art teacher at Cowra High School, Makin began private lessons from Desiderius Orban (who would also tutor Makin's friend and associate John Olsen) and the Julian Ashton Art School, Sydney, in 1961. From 1962 to 1966, Makin completed a Diploma in Painting at the National Art School in Sydney where he also received an Art Progression Student Scholarship.

Later in life, Makin would go on to complete a Masters by Research at Deakin University in Geelong, Victoria, compiling his thesis entitled: "Meaning, Significance, and the Sublime in the Depiction of the Australian landscape".

== Career ==
After graduating in 1966, Makin held his first exhibition at the Watters Gallery, and began to be awarded art prizes.

Makin is best known for his paintings en plein air of the Australian landscape. His development as an artist and landscape painter was influenced by various techniques, including traditional landscapes, Modernism, Impressionism and Abstraction. Through the 1970s he travelled across Europe, the US and the UK, expanding his knowledge of various art forms. As an example, came during a residency at the Gloucestershire College of Art in Cheltenham, UK, in 1978, Makin viewed a Georgio Morandi exhibition that left a lasting impression. In particular Makin was impressed by European landscape tradition in works by Salvator Rosa, Paul Cézanne, and David Bomberg. Upon returning to Australia, Makin revisited several Australian works, notably those of Eugene Von Guerard and Fred Williams.

Makin attended various painting excursions with fellow landscape artists and friends, and had painted outdoors with Fred Williams regularly since the early 1970s. Together, Williams and Makin would find places and landmarks that had been painted by members of the Heidelberg School artists camps including Tom Roberts, and Arthur Streeton of the Australian impressionist movement. The 1982 death of his good friend and mentor Fred Williams had a profound impact on Makin and his future work. Not long after, Makin exhibited his first sell-out show, the 'Ash Wednesday' series at Realities Gallery, Melbourne, and his first European show at Bernard Jacobson Gallery in London, in 1983.

In 2001, Makin took part in an expedition to Lake Eyre in South Australia, along with nine other artists including John Olsen, Tim Storrier, Robert Jacks, David Larwill and others. The project was funded by the David Deague Family Foundation and resulted in a book, William Creek and Beyond, a film documentary and a touring exhibition.

Makin's motifs included seascapes, waterfalls and pastoral vistas. Notable locations such as the You Yangs (first introduced to Makin by Williams), the Grampians and Wannon Falls. In 1990, he resigned from his academic post at the Royal Institute of Technology (RMIT) to become a full-time artist. This followed his tenure in an artist-in-residence program at the University of Edinburgh, Scotland.

On his return to Australia in 1991, Makin lived in a historic property, Glen Harrow, in the Dandenong Ranges, which provided him with a lush garden and surrounding landscape in which he could enhance his technique.

== Academic and other roles ==
He has held numerous professional appointments alongside his painting career including Senior and Principal Lectureships in Fine Art at Melbourne institutions such as RMIT, Phillip Institute of Technology, Prahran College of Advanced Education. In 1996/97 he re-entered academic life as Foundation Director to set up the new National Art School in Sydney.

He has also written extensively as art critic for The Sun News-Pictorial from 1972 to 1982, and the Herald Sun from 1997 to 2009. He has contributed to numerous magazines, and has several books to his name, the latest being Critical Moments, published by MacMillan in 2011.

== Awards and recognition ==
Early in his career, Makin was awarded numerous art prizes, including:

- Rockdale Prize
- Drummoyne Prize
- Mirror-Waratah Prize

== Collections ==
Makin's works are represented in all national, state and most regional and institutional collections in Australia. These include NGA, NGV, AGNSW, QAG, AGWA, Parliament House, Geelong, Benalla, Sale, Townsville, as well as La Trobe and Melbourne University collections. His works are also in numerous private collections in Australia, the UK and the USA.

== Family and personal life ==
Makin currently lives and works in an old music hall in a village called Chewton in the Central Goldfields region of Victoria. He is married to Elizabeth Crompton with whom he has two sons, James Makin and Hugh Makin. James Makin co-directs Port Jackson Press Gallery with Jeffrey Makin and is also the director of James Makin Gallery in Collingwood, Victoria. Hugh Makin is a bespoke furniture designer who runs the Makin Workshop.
