= Marsha Rowe =

Australian-British journalist, writer and editor (born 1944)

- Born: 1944 (age 81–82); Sydney, Australia
- Occupations: Journalist, writer and editor
- Known for: Co-founder of Spare Rib magazine

Marsha Rowe (born 1944) is an Australian-born journalist, writer and editor now living in the United Kingdom. In 1972, she was co-founder, with Rosie Boycott, of the leading feminist magazine Spare Rib.

== Early life ==
Rowe was born in Sydney, Australia, and raised on the North Shore of Neutral Bay. Her father was an engineer. After a typing course at a Sydney technical college, she worked for the Commonwealth Scientific and Industrial Research Organisation (CSIRO), then based in the grounds of Sydney University.

Rowe was a secretary for Oz magazine from 1964 when it was based in Sydney, its original location. Because Rowe was aged under 21, editors Richard Neville and Richard Walsh had to persuade Rowe's father to allow her join the staff.

"I saw the freedom, the opportunity to make satire, the (editors') lack of reverence for authority," she told Helen Trinca of The Australian in 2013. "I was still rather mentally restricted in terms of authority, but I could see how they were so funny and mentally stimulating. I learnt a lot from OZ -- how to start a magazine and do it yourself. Where do you go for new ideas and thinking?" Her period at the Sydney OZ lasted until 1966. Rowe then worked for the Australian edition of Vogue, but found fashion journalism a restrictive area in which to work.

== Counterculture in London ==
Rowe settled in London in 1969, but at first disliked the city because of the pervading attitude to expatriate Australians. During her six-months in Greece which soon followed, the regime of the Colonels politicised her, and she returned to London.

Rowe was employed on the London edition of OZ, and one of the magazine's London editors, Felix Dennis, later described her as the publication's "anchor" during this period. When the three editors (Neville, Dennis and Jim Anderson) were tried at the Old Bailey for obscenity in Schoolkids Oz, Rowe was part of the defence team and was responsible for typing documents for the defence each evening. "I hated having to be a secretary. But I really did have a sort of idea that maybe women were there to support men," she told Andy Beckett in 2005. "In the counter-culture we still did all that stuff the men didn't."

However, when the three male editors were away, Rowe was not left in charge. When Neville co-founded the short-lived Ink in 1971, Rowe joined him, but resigned over the male domination of the venture after a few months. Three female typists, whom she had hired, were sacked by the men when the publication acquired new office equipment. She was aware of what some of the women had given up to work for Ink; it had no trade union representation. It appeared to her, and underground press colleague Louise Ferrier (who was romantically connected to Neville at the time), that sexual freedom for men still meant women were objectified and excluded from the editorial process. (Rowe has quoted one woman as having said that year: "With brothers like these, who needs chauvinists?")

With Michelene Wandor also involved, they organised a series of meetings for other women involved in the underground press. Fifty people turned up at the first meeting in December 1971 at Rowe and Ferrier's basement flat in Notting Hill. At the third meeting, Rowe has said she suggested women should establish their own magazine. An American in London, Bonnie Boston, had suggested the idea to her, but according to Stephen Alomes, the only other supportive voice came from Rosie Boycott.

== Founding Spare Rib ==
Boycott and Rowe founded Spare Rib, the feminist monthly magazine, the first edition appearing in June 1972. It was intended as "the alternative news magazine for women", and Rowe has written that while it was "seen as the public face of the women's movement", the magazine "was not synonymous with the movement". The 20,000 print run of the first two issues sold out, helped by the publicity received from the refusal of W. H. Smith to stock it. Boycott and Rowe, however, had significant differences and the formation of a collective to run the magazine, at Rowe's suggestion, led to Boycott being marginalised, and she resigned 18 months after the launch.

A Spare Rib Books imprint (soon to be renamed Virago Press) was founded in 1973 by Carmen Callil whose own company had assisted on publicity for the magazine's launch. Rowe and Boycott became directors of the new company, but both resigned the following year.

== Later life ==
Rowe, after herself leaving Spare Rib in 1987, became a freelance editor, commissioning books for feminist publishers and writing her own works. She was fiction editor at independent publishing firm Serpent's Tail and ran a life-writing course (Your Life's Word). Among the collections she compiled for Serpent's Tail are Sex and the City (1989), So Very English (1991), and Sacred Space (1992). Rowe contributed to the 1992 anthology Serious Hysterics, edited by Alison Fell, which also featured short stories by Marina Warner, Lynne Tillman, Zoe Fairbairns, Nicole Ward Jouve, Leslie Dick and other writers.

Rowe collaborated with Felix Dennis and Mike Pentelow, on The Characters of Fitzrovia, which was published in November 2001.

After living in London for many years and for some years in Leeds, and she moved to Norwich, and is working on writing a memoir.

== Bibliography ==
=== As editor ===
- Spare Rib Reader. Harmondsworth: Penguin. 1982. ISBN 978-0140052503.
- Sex and the City: A Serpent's Tail Compilation. Serpent's Tail. 1989. ISBN 978-1852421656.
- So Very English: A Serpent's Tail Compilation. Serpent's Tail. 1991. ISBN 978-1852421793. Contributors include Mario Vargas Llosa, Fay Weldon, Susan Daitch, Kathy Lette, Lynne Tillman, Nicole Ward Jouve, Fleur Adcock, Jean Binta Breeze, Roy Heath, Adam Zameenzad, Naomi Mitchison, Kate Pullinger, Judith Grossman, Jill Neville, Ben Okri, Emma Tennant, Deborah Levy, and others.
- Sacred Space. Serpent's Tail. 1992. ISBN 978-1852422608.
- Infidelity. Chatto & Windus. 1993. ISBN 978-0701144630.
- With Mike Pentelow, The Characters of Fitzrovia. Chatto & Windus. 2001. ISBN 978-0701173142.
