= The Trials of Oz =

- Written by: Geoffrey Robertson (adaptor of transcripts)
- Directed by: Sheree Folkson
- Starring: Hugh Grant; Leslie Phillips; Simon Callow; Nigel Hawthorne
- Country of origin: United Kingdom
- Original language: English

Production
- Producer: Simon Curtis
- Editor: Stephen Newnham (video tape)
- Camera setup: multi-camera
- Running time: 90 mins.
- Production company: BBC/ABC (Aus)

Original release
- Network: BBC 2
- Release: 9 November 1991

The Trials of Oz is 1991 video-taped BBC television drama shown in the UK on 9 November 1991 as part of BBC 2's Performance anthology series of single plays.

The drama concerns the six-week trial in June and July 1971 of the joint editors of the British underground magazine Oz in which the three men were prosecuted on three charges, including obscenity, for the 28th issue known as Schoolkids Oz. It is based on the transcripts of the court case which were adapted by Geoffrey Robertson, who was junior defence counsel at the trial. The re-enactment features Hugh Grant as Richard Neville, Peter O'Brien as Jim Anderson, Kevin Allen as Felix Dennis, the three charged men. The production also featured Leslie Phillips as Judge Michael Argyle, Nigel Hawthorne as Brian Leary, Simon Callow as John Mortimer, Alfred Molina as George Melly, Lee Cornes as Marty Feldman, and Nigel Planer as John Peel.

The three accused were convicted of obscenity and given sentences ranging from nine to fifteen months, but released on appeal at which the trial judge was severely reprimanded for misdirecting the jury.

The play was nominated for a BAFTA Award as Best Single Drama.

== See also ==
Hippie Hippie Shake, an unreleased 2010 feature film about Neville, the creation of UK Oz, and the obscenity trial.
