= Schoolkids Oz =

Controversial magazine issue

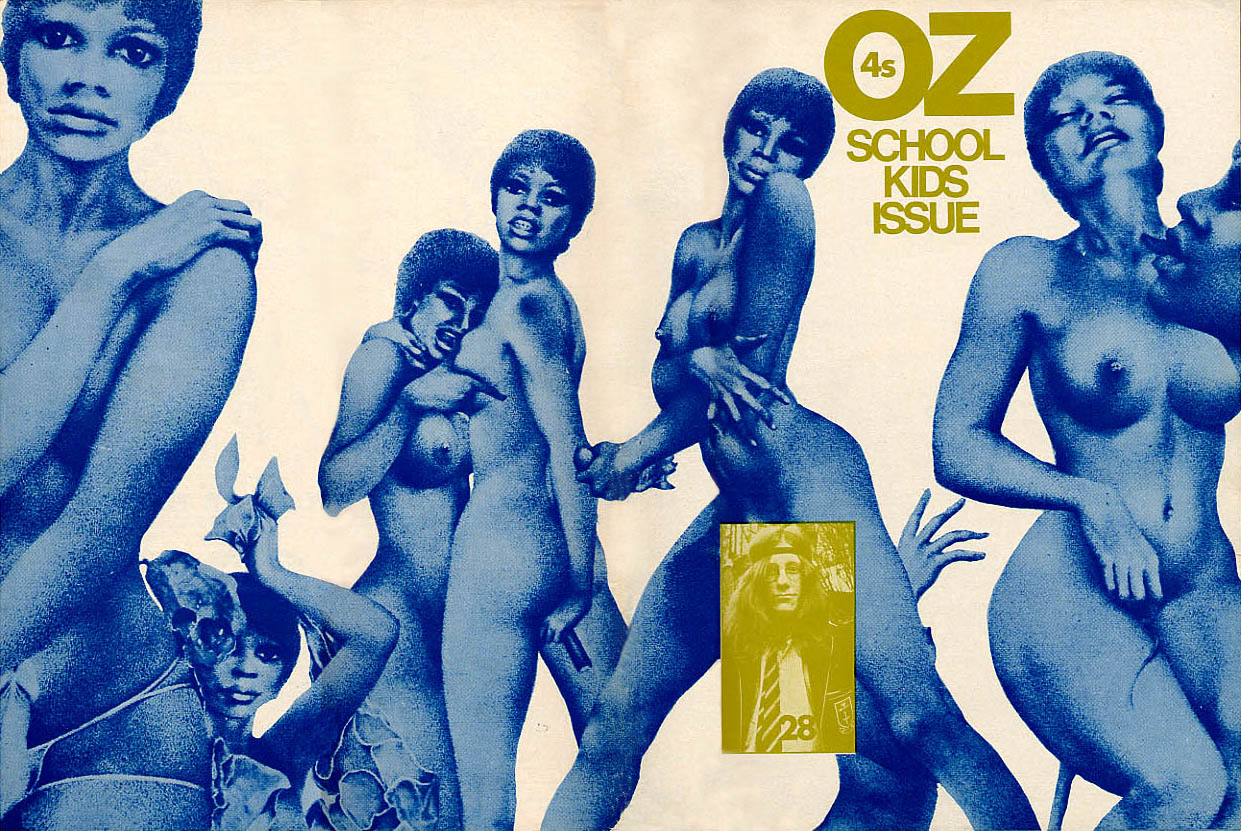
Oz No. 28: the Schoolkids issue

Schoolkids Oz was No. 28 of Oz magazine. The issue was, on a special occasion, edited by 5th- and 6th-form school students. It was the subject of a high-profile obscenity case in the United Kingdom from June 1971 to 5 August 1971, the longest trial under the 1959 Obscene Publications Act.

== The trial ==
The trial of Oz editors Richard Neville, Felix Dennis, and Jim Anderson, for No. 28, Schoolkids Oz, was conducted at the Old Bailey, under the auspices of Judge Michael Argyle. Of particular significance is the adaptation by Vivian Berger of a Robert Crumb cartoon to include the Rupert Bear cartoon character in an explicitly sexual situation.

The defence lawyer was John Mortimer, QC, later the writer of the Rumpole of the Bailey television series. He was assisted by junior counsel Geoffrey Robertson, later to become a prominent barrister in his own right.

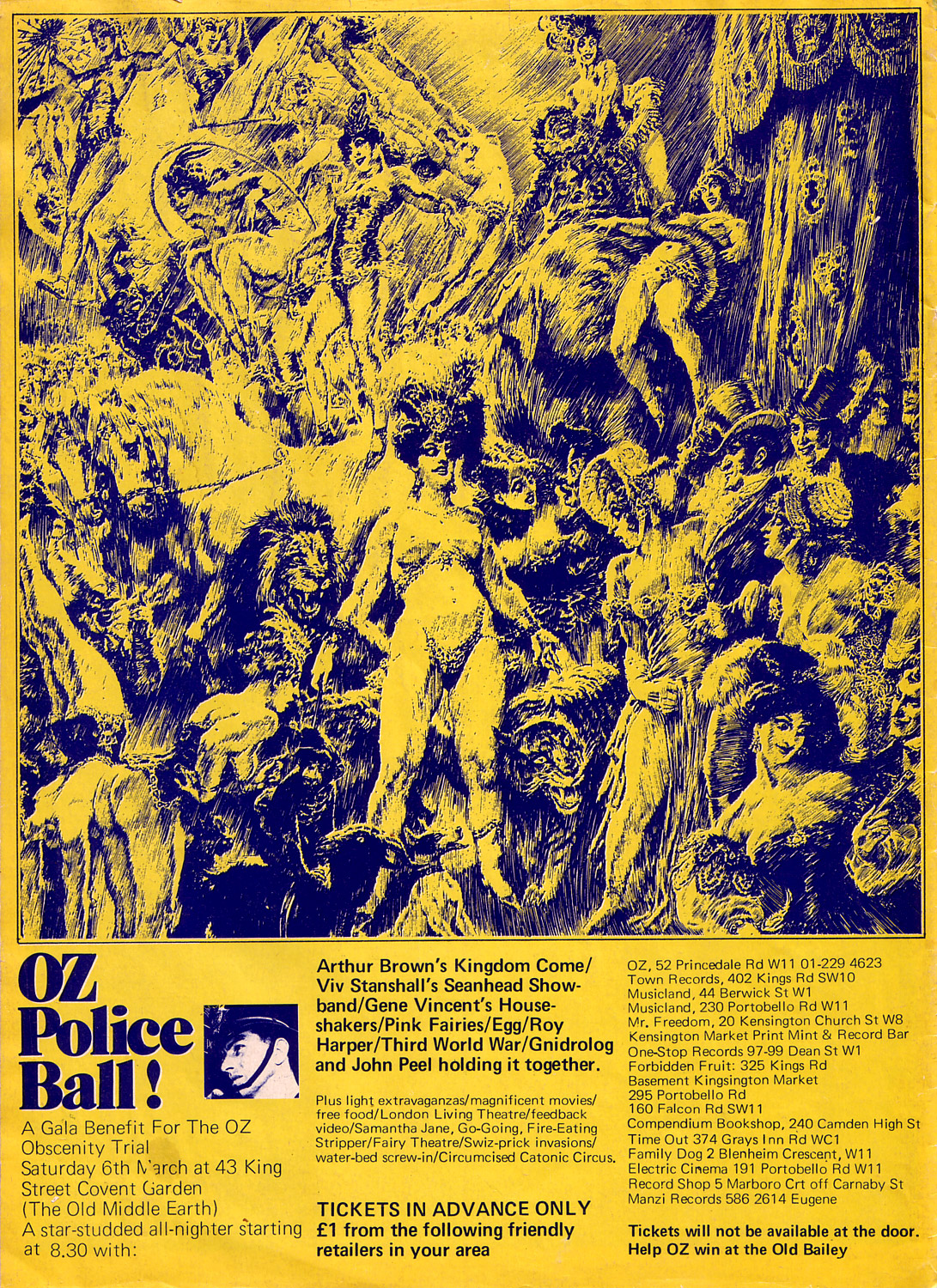
Oz No. 33, back cover advertising "A Gala Benefit for the Oz Obscenity Trial"

The defendants were found guilty and sentenced to up to 15 months' imprisonment. This was later quashed on appeal by the Lord Chief Justice Lord Widgery.

== Reactions ==
In her "Oz Trial Post-Mortem", which was not published until it was included in The Madwoman's Underclothes (1986), the magazine's contributor Germaine Greer wrote:

Before repressive tolerance became a tactic of the past, Oz could fool itself and its readers that, for some people at least, the alternative society already existed. Instead of developing a political analysis of the state we live in, instead of undertaking the patient and unsparing job of education which must precede even a pre-revolutionary situation, Oz behaved as though the revolution had already happened.

Geoffrey Robertson later adapted the transcripts of the trial into the television drama The Trials of Oz (1991). Hippie Hippie Shake, an unreleased 2010 feature film directed by Beeban Kidron, is about Neville, the creation of UK Oz, and the obscenity trial.
