= Michael Argyle =

Michael Argyle may refer to:

- Michael Argyle (judge) (1915–1999), British judge
- Michael Argyle (psychologist) (1925–2002), British social psychologist
