= Tom Bass (sculptor) =

Australian sculptor

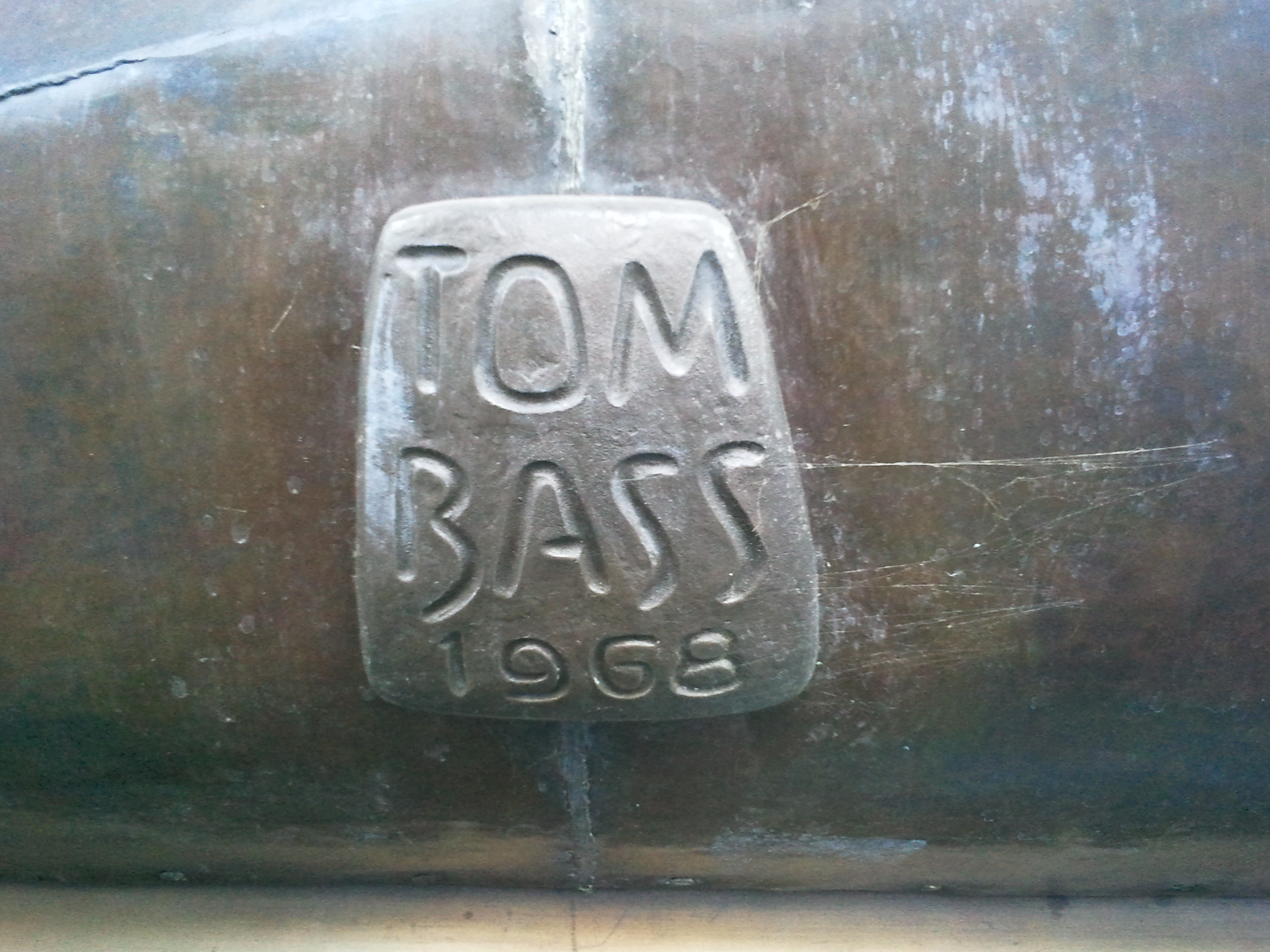
- Signature at the Australian National Library
- Born: 6 June 1916; Lithgow, New South Wales, Australia
- Died: 26 February 2010 (aged 93)
- Education: Dattilo Rubbo Art School, National Art School
- Known for: Sculpture
- Awards: Member of the Order of Australia

Thomas Dwyer Bass, AM (6 June 1916 – 26 February 2010) was an Australian sculptor. Born in Lithgow, New South Wales, he studied at the Dattilo Rubbo Art School and the National Art School. Bass served in the Second Australian Imperial Force during the Second World War, rising to the rank of sergeant. He established the Tom Bass Sculpture School in Sydney in 1974. In 1988, he was made a Member of the Order of Australia (AM) for services to sculpture. In 2009, he was admitted to the degree of Doctor of Visual Arts (honoris causa) at the University of Sydney.

A retrospective of his work, spanning 60 years, was exhibited at the Sydney Opera House between 9 November and 17 December 2006.

Bass was interviewed in 1965 about his life and sculpture works by Hazel de Berg. This can be found at the National Library of Australia.

== Totem maker ==
After graduating from the National Art School, Bass developed his philosophy of working as a sculptor as being the maker of totemic forms and emblems, described as work expressing ideas of particular significance to communities or to society at large. Examples of his work include The Trial of Socrates and The Idea of a University at Wilson Hall, Melbourne University; The Falconer on Main Building at University of New South Wales; the winged figure of Ethos in Civic Square, Canberra; and the Lintel sculpture at the National Library, Canberra. He focused on this subject for roughly 25 years.

== Contribution to art in Australia ==
In critic John McDonald's 2010 estimation, during the 50s and 60s Bass was "the only Australian sculptor who understood the importance of bringing art to the widest possible audience. ...With every major commission Bass aimed to push the boundaries of public taste, giving his audience a lesson in the visual language of modernism."

== P & O Wall fountain ==
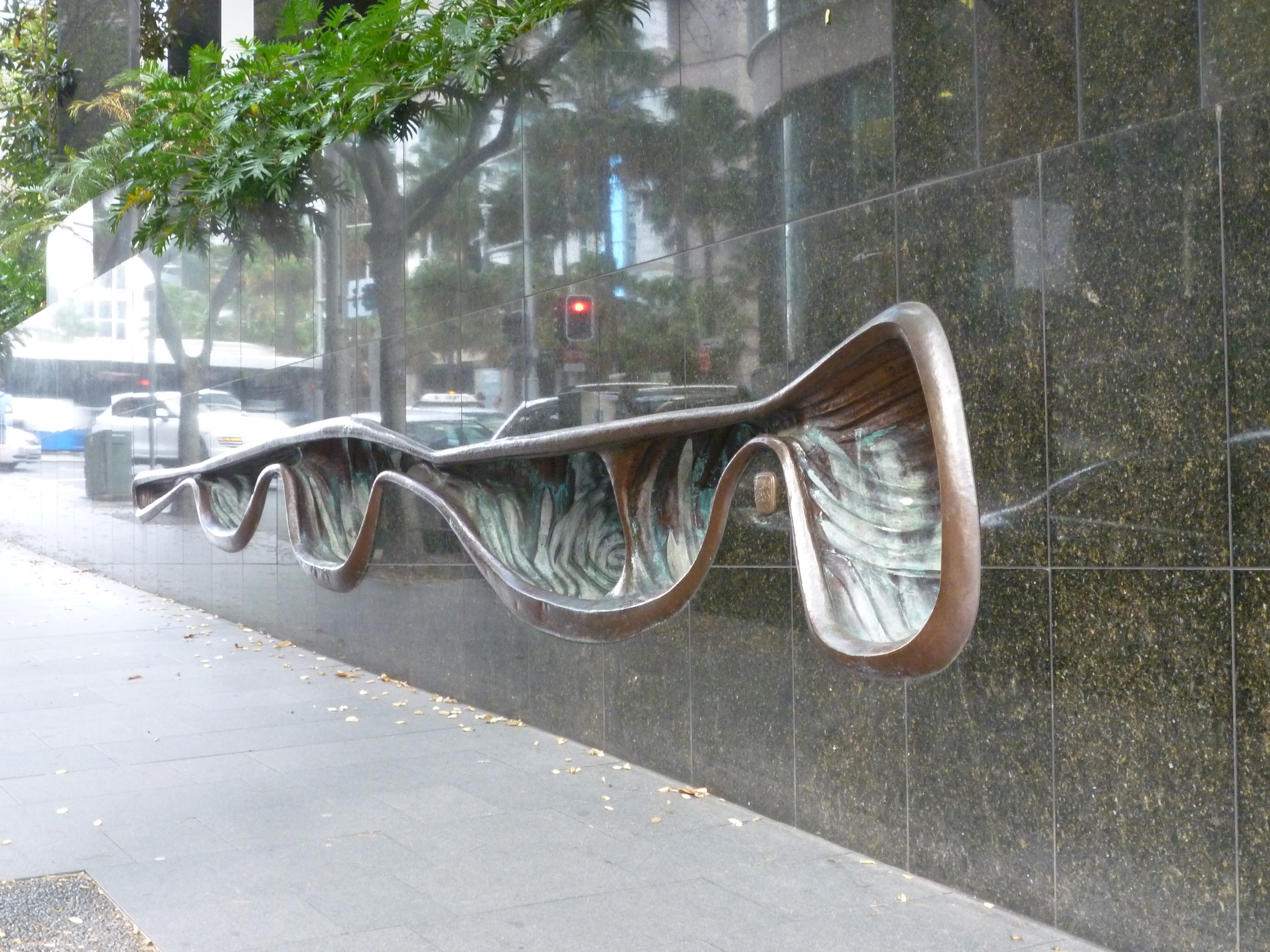
P & O Wall fountain

- 1962–63, Copper 107×800×55 cm, commissioned by P&O Orient Lines of Australia P/L in 1961, 55 Hunter Street, Sydney.

Bass produced an abstract wall fountain structure for the P&O Company, which caused considerable controversy when it was completed in 1963. When the work was unveiled, its indirect resemblance to a Parisian pissoir and its position opposite the French Airline office provoked a comment in the sixth edition of OZ magazine (1964) about the city's latest status symbol as a convenience for the people of Sydney and as a welcoming sign to French travellers: "there is a nominal charge, of course, but don't worry, there is no need to pay immediately. Just P. & O." (pee and owe). With it they published a satirical photograph which showed the fountain apparently being used as a urinal, with a caption which read "Pictured is a trio of Sydney natives P. & O.'ing in the Bass urinal". For this and other supposed offences the editors of the magazine, Richard Neville, Richard Walsh and Martin Sharp were charged, tried and sentenced to jail with hard labour for "obscenity and encouraging public urination", although the defendants subsequently appealed against the sentences, which were revoked. In the trial Tom Bass appeared in their defence. The building was demolished in December 2017 for the construction of the entrance to the Martin Place Sydney Metro station 23 metres below street level, and the wall fountain has been reinstalled into the public space of the replacement building.

== AGC sculpture ==
- 1963, Copper 335.3×152.4×38 cm

Commissioned by AGC (Australian Guarantee Corporation) Australia in 1962 for AGC House, 126 Phillip Street, Sydney. When the original building was completely demolished in 2002, the work was salvaged, restored and reinstalled by Investa Property Group into the Foster and Partners designed building in late 2005.

== The Sisters (Variations I, II & III 1980) ==
- Bronze, 80×250×240 cm

Originally exhibited in Bass's first solo exhibition at the Sydney David Jones Gallery in 1980, the work reappeared in public at Martin Place for Sculpture in the City 2001 as part of Art About.

== Tom Bass Sculpture Studio School ==
Bass set up an independent school of sculpture in the 1970s at the site of a warehouse above Broadway. He spent a year cleaning the space and preparing it for classes and in 1974 classes began in the studio. The school moved from Broadway to Erskineville in 1998, where it continues to run sculpture classes today.

== Selected works ==
- The Student, sandstone, main gates, University of Sydney, 1953.
- The falconer, electrolytic copper, Main Building, University of New South Wales, 1955. UNSW Art Collection Sculpture Walk
- Fountain figure, electrolytic copper, Chancellor's Court, University of New South Wales, 1959.
- The Idea of a University, reconstituted stone, The University of Melbourne, 1954–59.
- The Trial of Socrates, copper, The University of Melbourne, 1954–59.
- Research, copper. ICI Building, Sydney, 1956–59
- Ethos, copper, Civic Square, Canberra, 1959–61.
- AMP Emblem, copper, AMP building, Sydney, 1962
- AGC sculpture, copper. AGC House, Sydney, 1962–63
- Children's Tree, bronze, CML building, Elizabeth St, Melbourne, 1963.
- P&O wall fountain, copper, P&O building, Hunter St, Sydney, 1963.
- Lintel sculpture, copper bas-relief, National Library of Australia, Canberra, 1967–1968.
- The Genii, bronze, Queen Victoria Gardens, Melbourne, 1973.
- Don Bradman bust in Cricket Captains' Walk, Cootamundra, NSW, 2008.
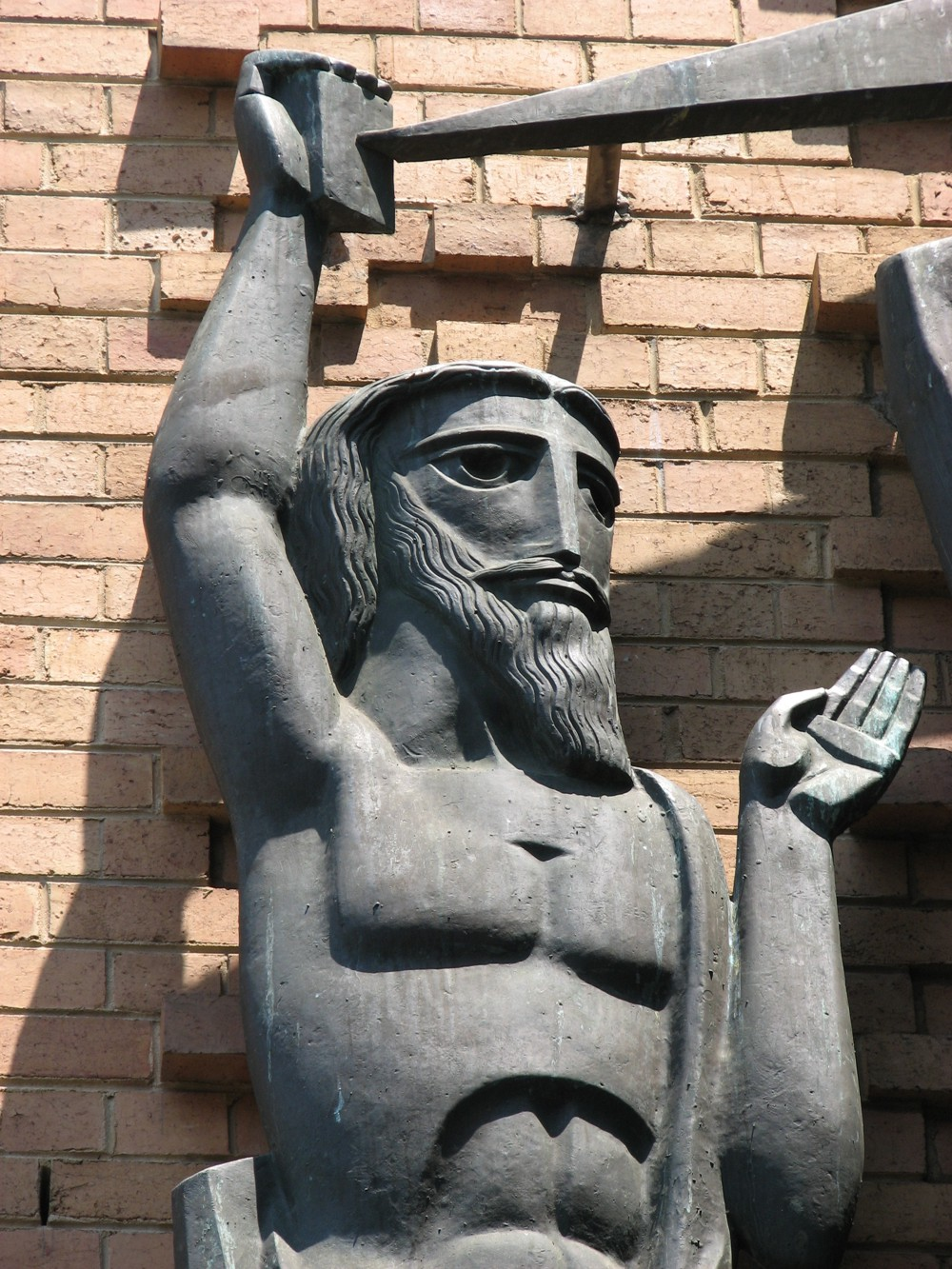
Detail from The Trial of Socrates

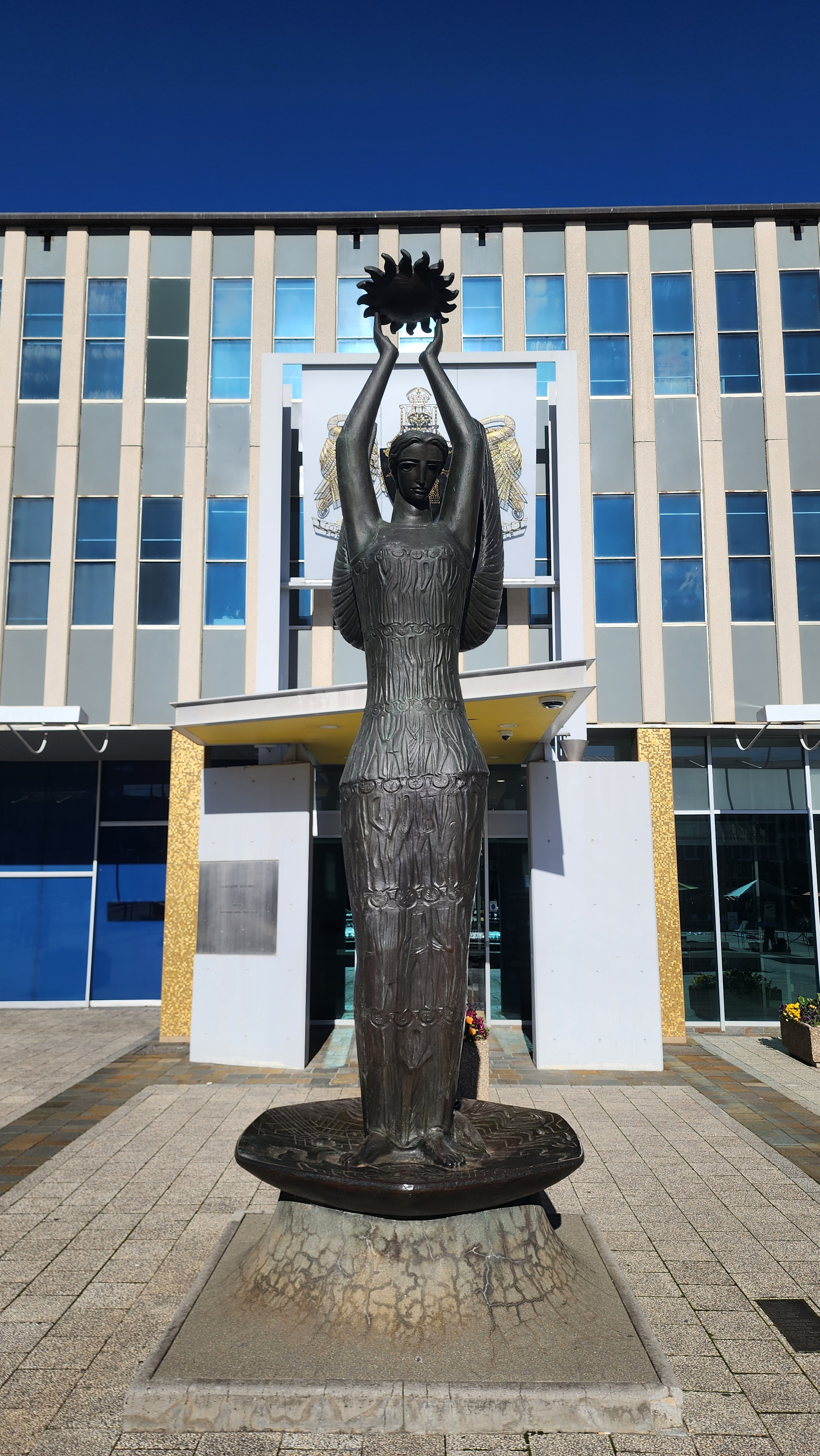
Ethos

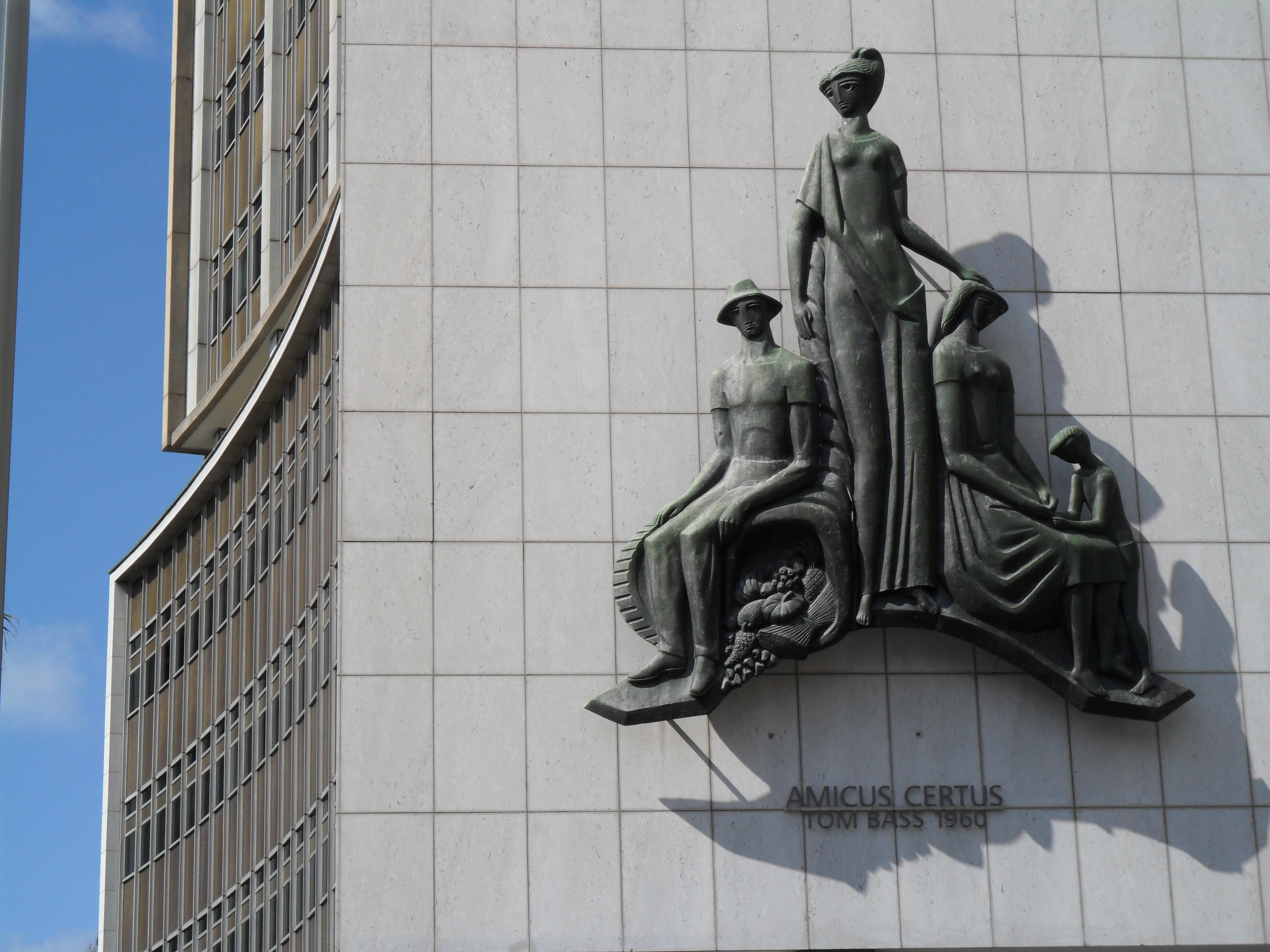
AMP Emblem

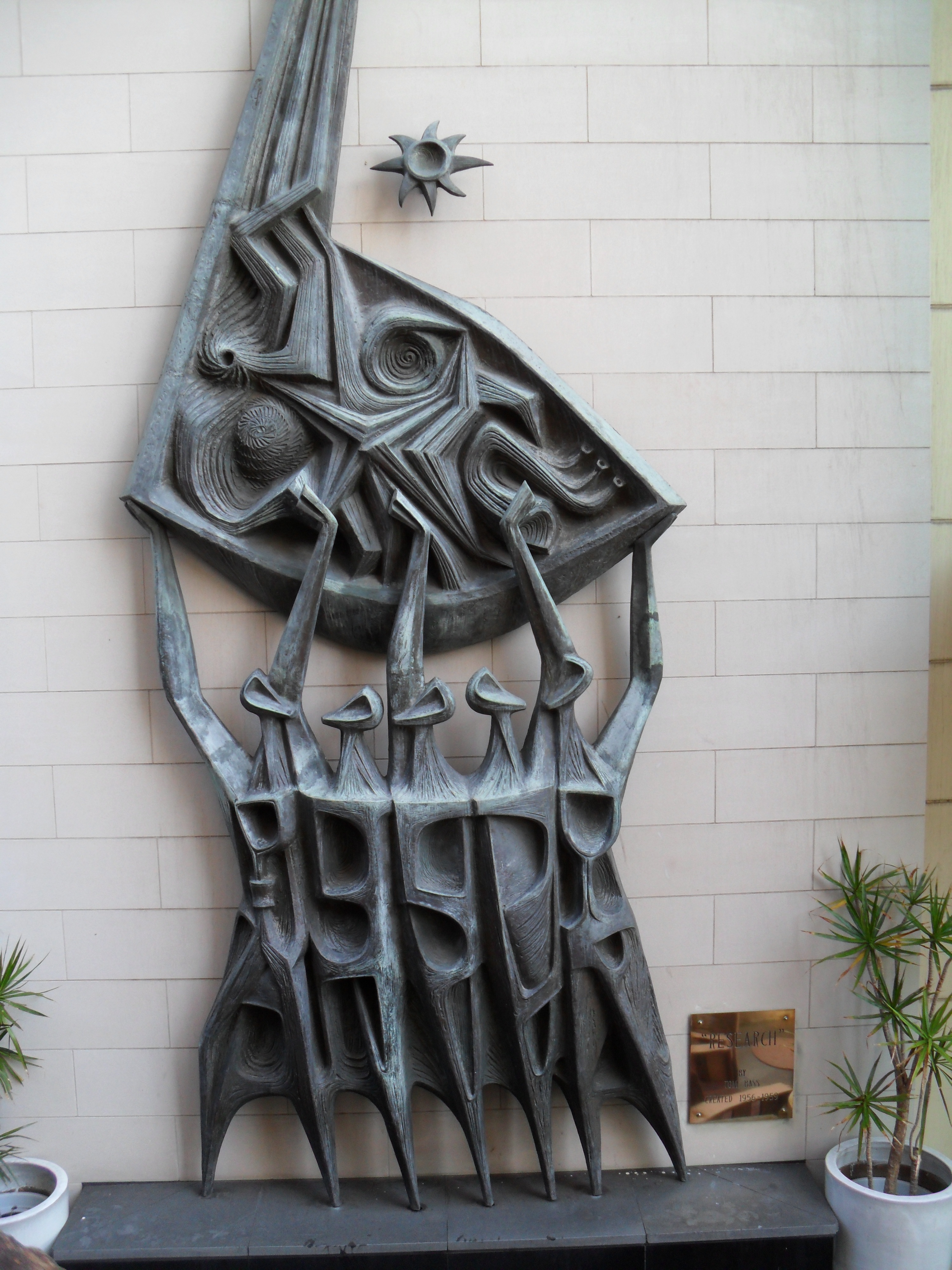
Research, Circular Quay (east)

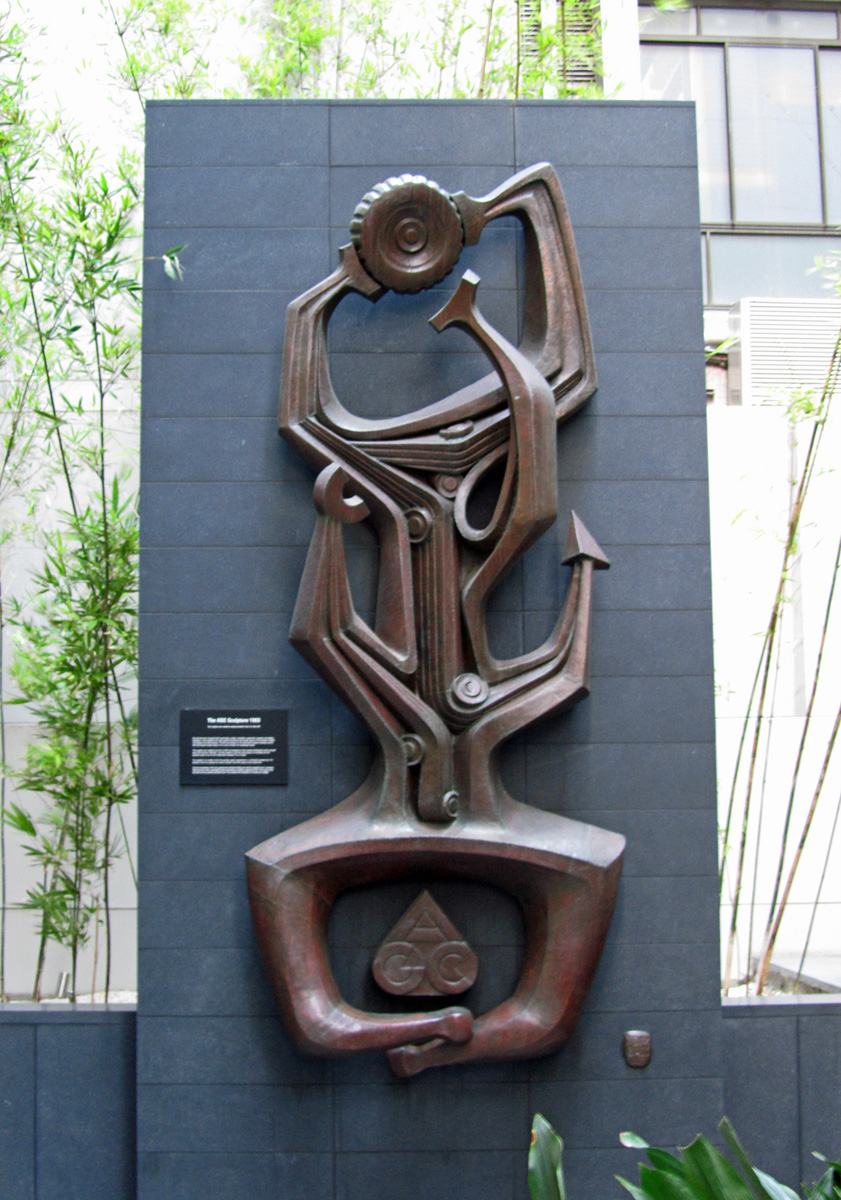
AGC sculpture

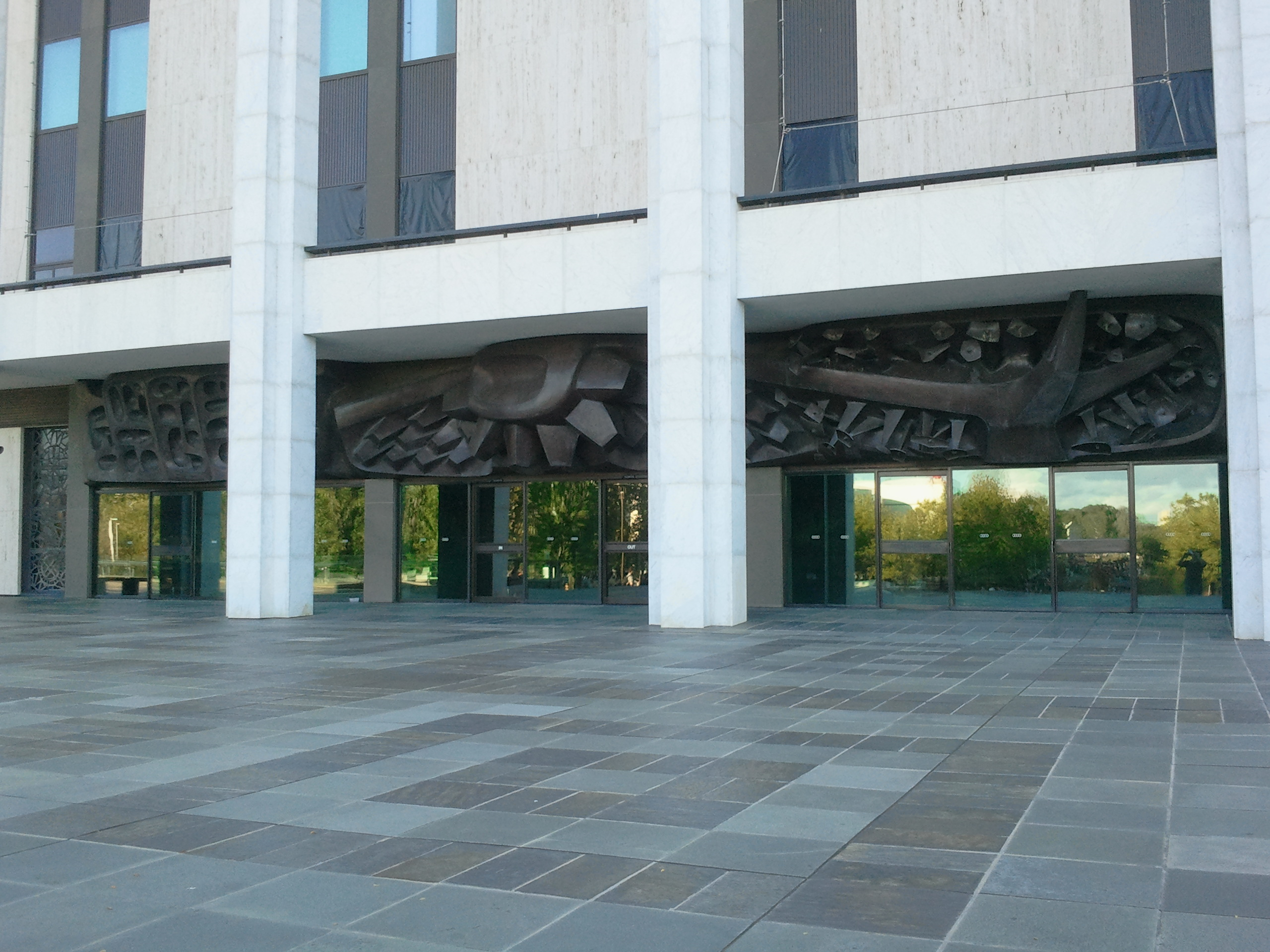
National Library of Australia (1968)

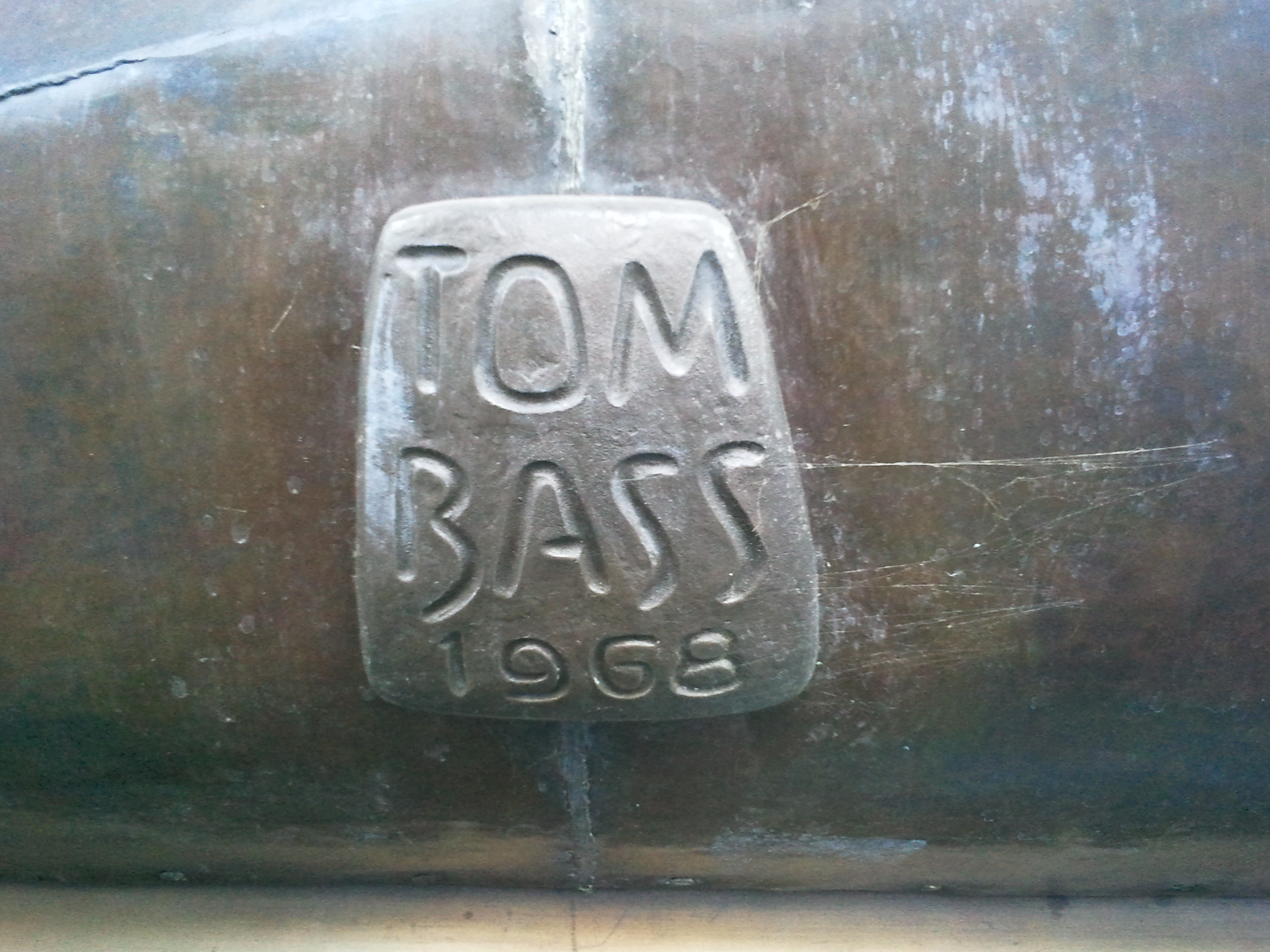
Tom Bass signature

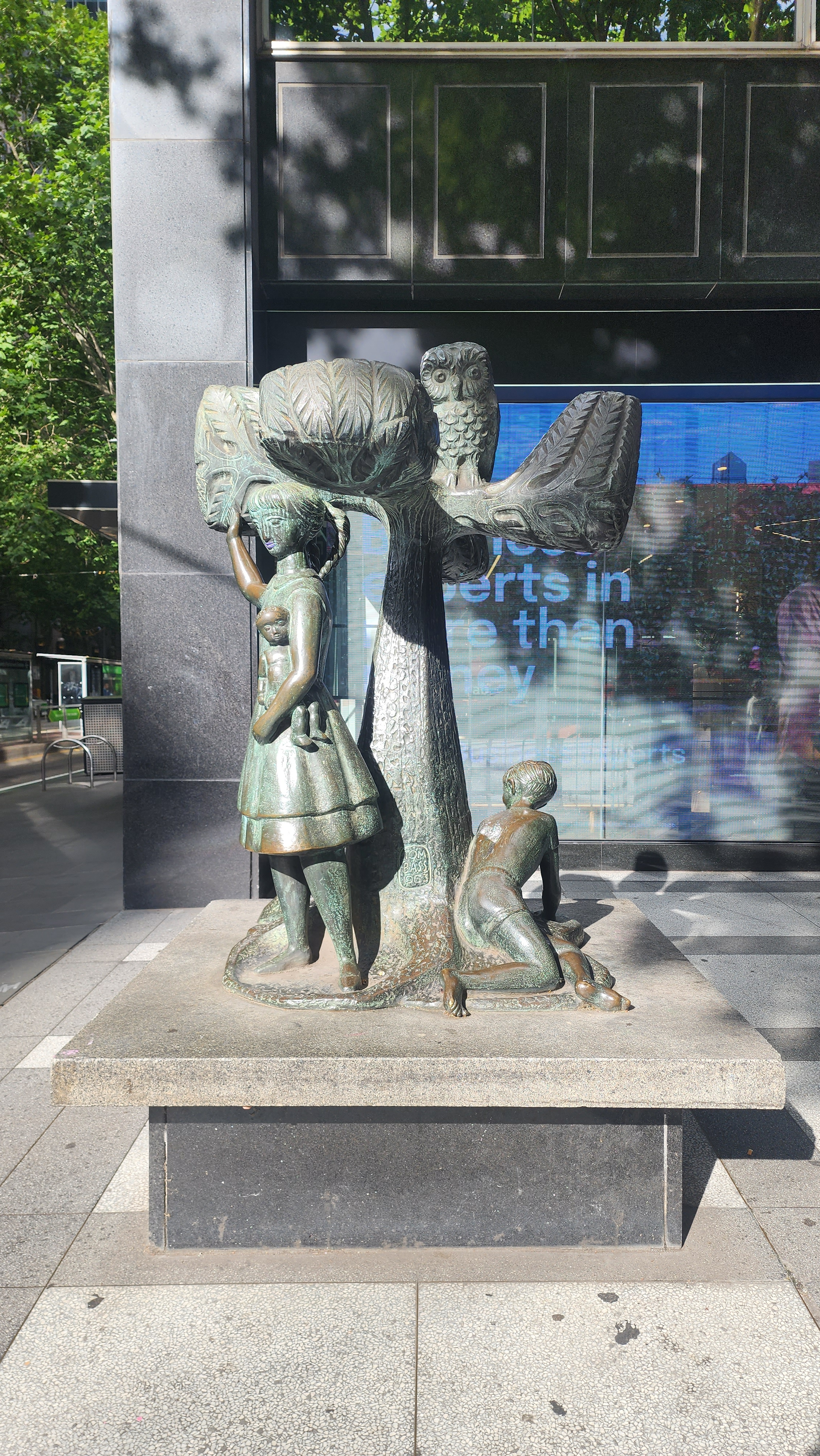
Children's Tree

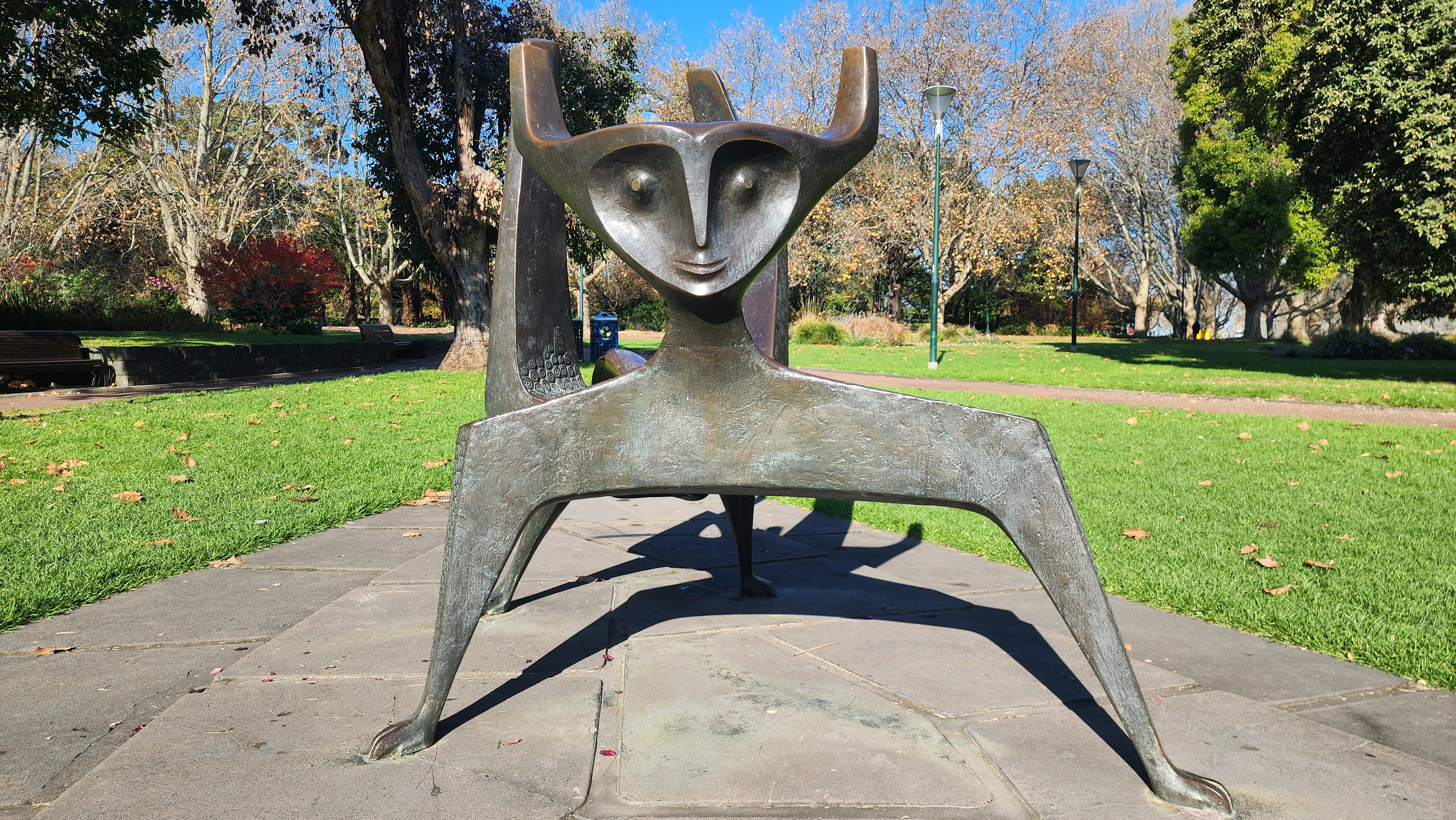
The Genie

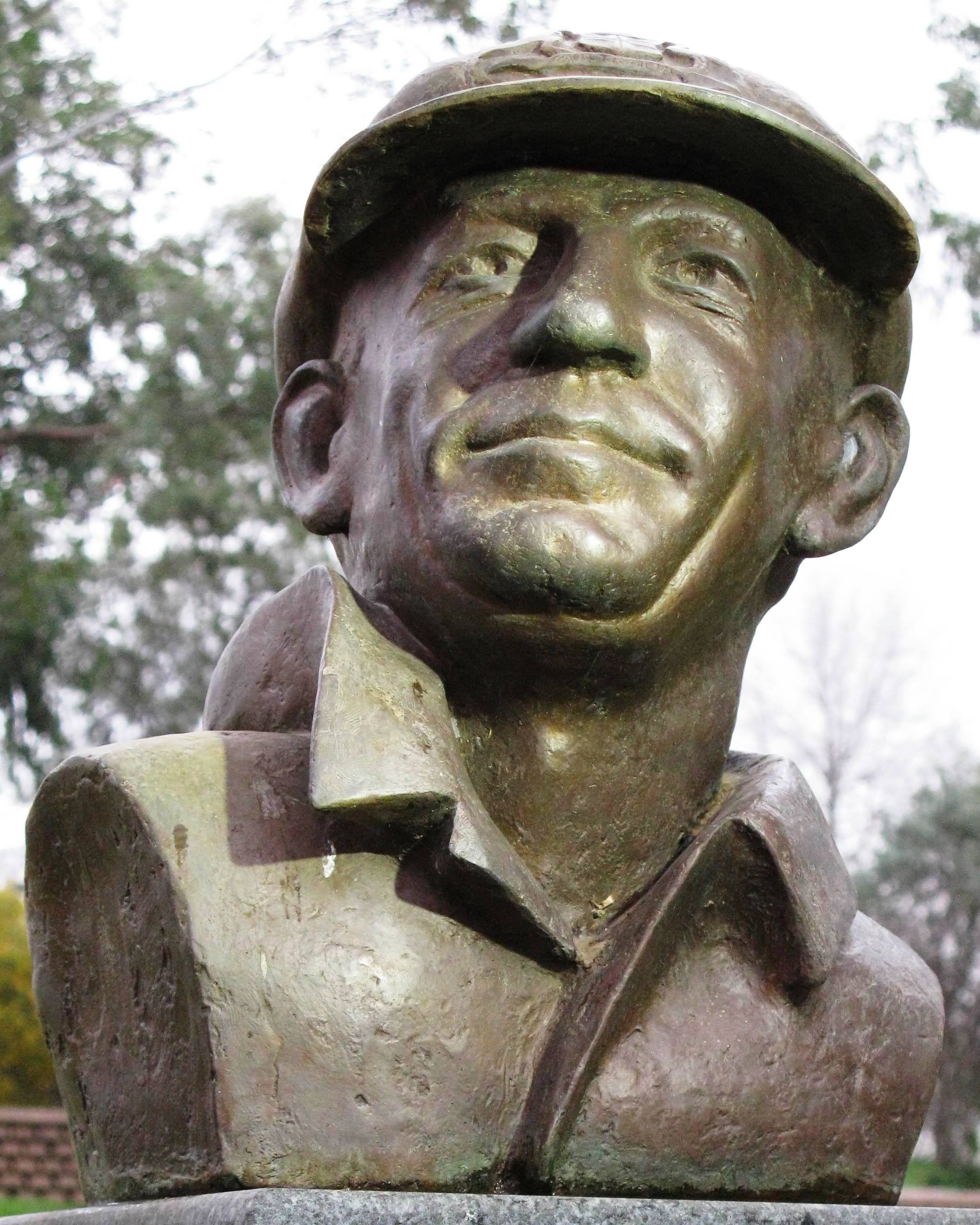
Don Bradman

== See also ==
- List of public art in the City of Sydney
