= Richard Neville (writer) =

Australian author and journalist (1941–2016)

- Born: Richard Clive Neville; 15 December 1941; Sydney, New South Wales, Australia
- Died: 4 September 2016 (aged 74); Byron Bay, New South Wales, Australia
- Occupations: Author; presenter; satirist; editor; speaker
- Spouse: Julie Clarke
- Children: 2
- Writing career
- Notable works: OZ Magazine editor (London, UK); Hippie Hippie Shake; Play Power, Amerika Psycho; Playing Around, Out of My Mind: From Flower Power

Richard Clive Neville (15 December 1941 – 4 September 2016) was an Australian writer and social commentator who came to fame as an editor of the counterculture magazine Oz in Australia and the United Kingdom in the 1960s and early 1970s. He was educated as a boarder at Knox Grammar School and enrolled for an arts degree at the University of New South Wales in Sydney, Australia. Australian political magazine The Monthly described Neville as a "pioneer of the war on deference".

== Oz ==
In late 1963 or early 1964, Neville, then editor of the UNSW student magazine Tharunka, met Richard Walsh, editor of its University of Sydney counterpart Honi Soit, as well as artist Martin Sharp. Neville and Walsh wanted to publish their own "magazine of dissent" and asked Sharp to become a contributor. The magazine was dubbed Oz.

Oz was launched on April Fool's Day in 1963. Its radical and irreverent attitude was very much in the tradition of the student newspapers, but its growing public profile quickly made it a target for "the Establishment," and it soon became a prominent cause during the so-called "Censorship Wars".

During the life of Australian Oz, Sharp, Neville, and Walsh were charged twice with printing an obscene publication. The first trial was relatively minor but they pleaded guilty, which resulted in their convictions being recorded. As a result, when they were charged with obscenity a second time, their previous convictions meant that the new charges were considerably more serious.

The charges centred on two items in the early issues of Oz — one was Sharp's ribald poem "The Word Flashed Around The Arms", which satirised the contemporary habit of youths gatecrashing parties; the other offending item was the famous photo (used on the cover of Oz #6) that depicted Neville and two friends pretending to urinate into a Tom Bass sculptural fountain, set into the wall of the new P&O office in Sydney, which had recently been opened by the Prime Minister Robert Menzies.

Sharp, Neville, and Walsh were tried, found guilty, and given prison sentences. Their convictions caused a public outcry and they were subsequently acquitted on appeal.

== London Oz ==
In late 1966, Neville and Sharp were early travellers on what was to become known as the "pot trail" or "the hippie trail": the overland route from Australia across Asia to Europe. The appendix to Neville's 1970 manifesto Play Power acted as the first manual for how to do the overland trail, in advance of any guidebooks in the traditional sense. Neville's sister, the novelist Jill Neville, was already living in London, as was his girlfriend Louise Ferrier. Swinging London was undergoing a "youth revolution" and Neville's and Sharp's arrival was perfectly timed.

In early 1967, Neville founded the London Oz with Martin Sharp as graphic designer. Many writers contributed, including Robert Hughes, Clive James, Germaine Greer, David Widgery, Alexander Cockburn and Lillian Roxon, among others. Felix Dennis (later to become one of Britain's wealthiest publishers with Dennis Publishing) came on board as advertising manager.

London Oz became increasingly influenced by hippie culture, and oscillated wildly between psychedelia, revolutionary political theory, and idealistic dreams of a counter-culture, with much discussion of drug-taking thrown in. Oz campaigned to legalise marijuana through various events such as the Legalise Pot Rally in Hyde Park, London, in 1968. Oz, however, was clearly against hard drugs. There was also much discussion and theoretical rumination regarding feminism and the "sexual revolution".

Although Neville had a reputation for being wild and stoned, he revealed in his autobiography Hippie Hippie Shake that he was more of a workaholic, obsessed with the magazine deadlines and his editorials, which often tried to make sense of all the competing philosophies that were exploding from the "youthquake". Neville was known as a charismatic and charming figure who had a wide circle of friends among London's intellectual and publishing elite, rock stars, socialist revolutionaries and criminals. Through the then editor of the London Evening Standard, Charles Wintour, he became friends with the young Anna Wintour.

While Neville was holidaying on Ibiza, an edition of the magazine entirely produced by high school students—Schoolkids Oz (May 1970)—was published, edited by Jim Anderson and Felix Dennis. The issue depicted Rupert Bear sporting a penis (1971) and led to the conviction of Neville, Jim Anderson and Felix Dennis. The then-longest obscenity trial in British history ensued, which ended in Oz supporters burning an effigy outside the court of Judge Michael Argyle, who was presiding over the case. In his evidence for the defence, the philosopher Richard Wollheim said that the trial represented a threat to tolerant society and risked provoking the generational polarisation that was dividing the United States with such disastrous consequences. The Court of Appeal of England and Wales quashed the sentences, holding that Argyle had made "very substantial and a serious misdirection" to the jury that had prosecuted the Oz editors.

The Oz defendants' legal team included barrister and screenwriter John Mortimer and Geoffrey Robertson. Several celebrities gave evidence and statements during the trial in support of Oz. John Lennon wrote and recorded "God Save Oz" and he and Yoko Ono marched the streets surrounding the Old Bailey in support of the magazine and freedom of speech. London Oz ended in November 1973.

== Later career ==
Neville returned to Australia, where he met his future partner, the journalist Julie Clarke. He began work on a new magazine, The Living Daylights, reporting on youth cultures, social inventions, and the shape of the future. He was a regular broadcaster on ABC Radio and wrote for an array of newspapers and magazines. He moved to New York City in 1977 to join Clarke, and wrote for The New York Times, New York magazine, and The Village Voice. Due to his experience on the hippie trail, publishers Random House commissioned Neville to write a book about a serial killer, then incarcerated in New Delhi, India, who had preyed upon Western backpackers in Asia. The resulting biography of Charles Sobhraj, co-authored by Clarke, was a global best-seller. It inspired several TV drama documentaries, including Shadow of the Cobra (1989).

In the 1980s, Neville and Clarke returned to Australia and purchased the property "Happy Daze" in Blackheath, in the Blue Mountains. He joined the Nine Network's popular Midday Show, where he reported on popular culture, innovative ideas, and sustainability. His segments often aroused controversy, such as when he inhaled marijuana on camera (to test its effect on one's ability to drive). These segments evolved into the Network Ten series Extra Dimensions, looking at sustainability and human potential. Neville and Clarke have two daughters: Lucy, born in 1983, and Angelica, born in 1989.

In the 1990s, across a variety of media, Richard explored social responsibility for businesses in the 21st century. This led to keynote addresses at national conferences and the essay collection Out of My Mind (Penguin). He also published his memoir Hippie Hippie Shake, which was adapted as a film by Working Title. For unknown reasons, the film was not released. Neville had sent the manuscript of his autobiography to Germaine Greer so that she could check its content, but she did not read it. When the book was published, however, she took offence.

Neville was also the co-founder of the Australian Futures Foundation.

The Australian OZ magazine has been digitised by the University of Wollongong. Yale University has acquired Neville's archive, which is now located in Beinecke Rare Book and Manuscript Library, Yale University.

Neville was diagnosed with early-onset dementia in his mid-60s. He died on 4 September 2016, at the age of 74.

== "Pederasty" ==
On 14 July 1975, Neville hosted an episode of the ABC Radio series Lateline entitled "Pederasty" in which "three men in their thirties who admitted sex relations with boys, and a teenage boy who said he had been involved in such relationships since he was 12, discussed their experiences frankly with (Neville)". One letter to the editor published in The Sydney Morning Herald described the adult men interviewed as "chuckling" as they described "waiting outside playgrounds to seduce young boys". A tape of the episode was turned over to police by Fred Nile and Peter Nixon of the then-National Country Party called for a public inquiry into the ABC. Asked about the program, ABC chairman Richard Downing initially commented that he had not heard it himself but that the ABC's general intention is to "try to inform people about what (is) happening so that they might be forewarned and forearmed". Later, he added: "In general, men will sleep with young boys and that's the sort of thing the community ought to know about". The ABC's response was only to introduce guidelines around the use of "four-letter words" and "crude expressions" but they rejected introducing further guidelines on program content, with Downing commenting that he wanted ABC staff to be "adventurous and imaginative (but not) titillating".

== Portrayals ==
In the television drama The Trials of Oz (1991), Neville was played by British actor Hugh Grant.

Irish actor Cillian Murphy starred as Neville in the unreleased film Hippie Hippie Shake. Produced by Working Title, the film was directed by Beeban Kidron, and co-starred Sienna Miller and Emma Booth. The film recounted how OZ was established, and the motley crew of Antipodean expatriates, led by Neville and others such as Brett Whiteley, Martin Sharp, and Philippe Mora, cut a cultural swathe through London.

== Books ==
- Play Power. London: Cape, 1970. ISBN 978-0224617888
- The Life and Crimes of Charles Sobhraj. Richard Neville and Julie Clarke. Sydney: Pan Books, 1980. ISBN 0-330-27144-X
- Playing Around. Milsons Point, NSW: Arrow Books, 1991. ISBN 0-09-182547-4
- Hippie, Hippie, Shake: The Dreams, the Trips, the Trials, the Love-ins, the Screw ups—the Sixties. Port Melbourne: William Heinemann Australia, 1995. ISBN 0-85561-523-0
- Footprints of the future : handbook for the third millennium, Richmond, 2002, ISBN 978-1-920688-03-5
- Amerika psycho behind Uncle Sam's mask of sanity, Melbourne Ocean (published 2002), 2003, ISBN 978-1-876175-62-7
- Out of my mind : from flower power to the third millennium-- the seventies, the eighties and the nineties, Penguin, 1996, ISBN 978-0-14-026270-4
