= Osborne Ladies' College =

Location
- Blackheath, New South Wales; Australia; 33°37′49″S 150°16′38″E

Information
- Type: Independent, single-sex, boarding
- Denomination: Non-denominational
- Established: 1910
- Status: Closed
- Closed: 1958
- Principal: Violet Gibbins

Osborne Ladies' College was an Australian girls school located in Blackheath, New South Wales from 1923 until 1958. It was renowned for being run in the tradition of the Royal Navy.

== History ==
Violet Gibbins was a pupil teacher who attended courses at the University of Sydney. Though she did not obtain any qualification, she became a teacher and later the principal of Cairns High School. She started a school in Bondi in 1910 initially for boys, but the school was later changed to girls. The school was advertised as being run along Royal Naval lines with a White Ensign being presented to the school in 1912 by the visiting HMS Drake.

During the First World War, Gibbins brother, Captain Norman Gibbins, was killed in action at Battle of Fromelles.

She later moved her school to Epping, changing the name of her school from the Epping Ladies' College to Osborne Ladies' College, in honour of the Royal Naval College, Osborne, on the Isle of Wight.

In 1923 Gibbins moved her school to its final location on 40 acres (160,000 m^{2}) near Blackhheath overlooking the Kanimbla and Megalong Valleys. The building was the former site of an unused hotel built in 1888. The average enrolment of the school was 50 students aged 7 to 16 years of age.

== Traditions ==
The school uniform was in naval blue worn with Royal Navy buttons. Junior girls of the school were known as "Middies" from the term Midshipman, with prefects being addressed as Lieutenants, and the head girl being addressed as lieutenant commander. Military courtesy applied with the senior girls being saluted. Gibbins was known as "the Admiral" while her governess Victoria Everingham knows as "the Commander".

In addition to the quarterdeck, the rooms of the school were known by the names of Royal Navy ships such as:

- HMS Pelican – Admiral Gibbins' room
- HMS Sirius – Commander Everingham's room
- HMS Sirius – Classroom
- HMS Sydney – Classroom
- HMS Sussex – Classroom
- HMS Revenge – Classroom
- HMS Albion – Classroom
- HMS Revenge – Bedroom
- (HMS Arethusa – Bedroom
- HMS Nelson – Assembly Hall
- HMS St. Vincent – Mess
- HMS Neptune – Bathroom
- HMS Dreadnought – Sickbay

The Osborne girls were marched to location and not allowed to speak to people outside the school. An emphasis was placed on physical fitness, spartan living (only one room was heated at the school, the library), archery, shooting, sports, and dramatic arts.

The school was closed in 1958 following the illness and death of Gibbins. The original building burned down in a fire in 1963. A new school, currently the Mountains Christian College was built on the site.

Memorabilia from Osborne Ladies' College is on display in the Mount Victoria museum.

== Alumni ==
- Jill Adelaide Neville (1932–1997) – Novelist, playwright and poet.
