= Jill Adelaide Neville =

Australian novelist, playwright and poet

Jill Adelaide Neville (29 May 1932 – 11 June 1997) was an Australian novelist, playwright and poet.

== Biography ==
Neville was born in Sydney, Australia, the older sister of Richard Neville. She grew up in the Blue Mountains area, becoming involved in the Sydney bohemian scene at the age 17. She attended Osborne Ladies' College, and left Australia for London in 1951.

In 1966, Neville published her first novel, Fall-Girl, which was based on her relationships with the poets Peter Porter and Robert Lowell. The novel received acclaim from contemporary critics.

She was married three times: to Peter Duval-Smith in 1960, David Leitch in 1970, and Lewis Wolpert in 1993.

She was elected a Fellow of the Royal Society of Literature in 1995.

== Novels ==
- Neville, Jill (1995). The day we cut the lavender. Ringwood, Vic.: Penguin Books Australia. ISBN 0-14-024823-4. OCLC 34651724.
- Neville, Jill (1993). Swimming the channel. London: Bloomsbury. ISBN 0-7475-1558-1. OCLC 29353282.
- Neville, Jill (1984). Last Ferry to Manly. Ringwood, Vic., Australia: Penguin Books Australia. ISBN 0-14-007068-0. OCLC 12011209.
- Neville, Jill (1969). The love-germ : a novel. London: Weidenfeld and Nicolson. ISBN 9780297179238. OCLC 1280860403.
- Fall-Girl (1966)
