= Hippie Hippie Shake =

British drama film

- Directed by: Beeban Kidron
- Screenplay by: Lee Hall
- Based on: Hippie Hippie Shake by Richard Neville
- Produced by: Tim Bevan; Eric Fellner; Nicky Kentish Barnes
- Starring: Cillian Murphy; Sienna Miller; Sean Biggerstaff; Max Minghella; Emma Booth; Peter Brooke
- Music by: Dario Marianelli
- Production companies: Working Title Films; StudioCanal
- Distributed by: Universal Pictures
- Country: United Kingdom
- Language: English

Hippie Hippie Shake is an unreleased British drama film produced by Working Title Films. It is based on a memoir by Richard Neville, editor of the Australian satirical magazine Oz, and chronicles his relationship with girlfriend Louise Ferrier, the launch of the London edition of Oz amidst the 1960s counterculture, and the staff's trial for distributing an obscene issue. Hippie Hippie Shake stars Cillian Murphy as Richard Neville, with Sienna Miller as Louise.

British film production company Working Title began development of Hippie Hippie Shake in 1998, but the film was repeatedly delayed, changing directors and screenwriters. In September 2007, the film finally began principal photography. In 2011, Working Title said that the film would not be released in cinemas.

== Premise ==
Hippie Hippie Shake follows the love story of Oz editor Richard Neville and Louise Ferrier, as Neville and his cohorts launch the London edition of the radical magazine, and are put on trial for publishing an obscene issue. The film serves as a metaphorical journey through the 1960s in London.

== Cast ==
- Cillian Murphy as Richard Neville
- Sienna Miller as Louise Ferrier, Neville's girlfriend
- Nina Liu as Jenny Kee
- Emma Booth as Germaine Greer
- Johnny Whitteridge as Max the flower painted hippy
- Hugh Bonneville as John Mortimer QC
- Margo Stilley as Cynthia Plaster Caster
- Tom Goodman-Hill as David Frost
- Matthew Beard as Charles
- Max Minghella as Martin Sharp
- Chris O'Dowd as Felix Dennis
- Lewis Clay as Paul Rodgers
- Genevieve Gaunt as Trudi
- Leah Hinton-Fishlock as Hippie Chick
- Peter Brooke as Jerry Rubin
- David Anthony as Roger Daltrey
- Sean Biggerstaff
- Daniel Mays as David Widgery
- Derek Jacobi
- Arjun Pillai as Eddie

== Pre-production delays ==
In October 1998, British film production company Working Title Films announced the development of the film Hippie Hippie Shake, based on Hippie Hippie Shake: The Dreams, the Trips, the Trials, the Love-ins, the Screw Ups: The Sixties, a memoir by Oz magazine editor Richard Neville. Screenwriter Don Macpherson was hired to write the adapted screenplay for the film, which was slated to begin production in 1999, depending on Working Title's status following the breakup of PolyGram Filmed Entertainment.

Production did not begin as anticipated. Working Title restarted development in February 2002, with director Shekhar Kapur attached to direct based on a script by Tom Butterworth. Again, the project was delayed.

In May 2007, Working Title announced its third attempt to produce Hippie Hippie Shake, this time with director Beeban Kidron and screenwriter Lee Hall. The film, which would be distributed by Universal Pictures, was slated to begin production in the autumn of 2007.

== Production ==
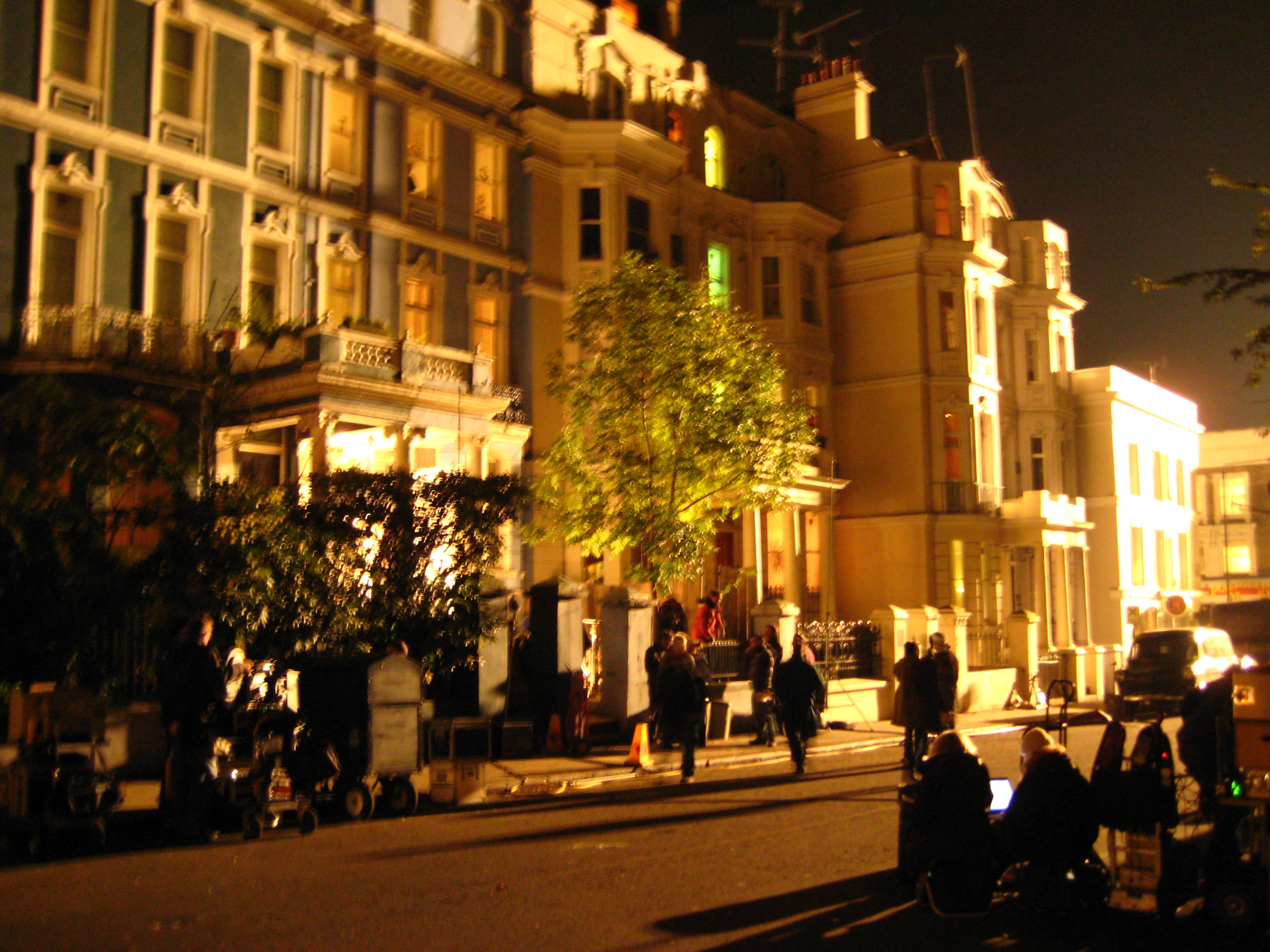
On the set of Hippie Hippie Shake Dec 2009, Colville Terrace, Notting Hill

Following William Nicholson's involvement with the script, principal photography began on 17 September 2007. Writer Richard Neville acknowledged the long development history of the film, but considered the film appropriate for the contemporary state of affairs: "Given that the world is at war, it couldn't be better timing to highlight the crazy, fun and political times of the 1960s... I think the timing is pretty terrific. Enough time has gone by to perhaps look at that era in a new perspective and help us reflect on what's going on today," Neville said.

Parts of the film were shot in the Hampstead district of London, and a house in South Hill Park was used as the exterior of Greer's home. Until his death, South Hill Park was the home of Anthony Minghella, the film director and father of Max Minghella. All Saint's Road was also used as a substitute for King's Road.

Some outdoor scenes were shot at Silent Pool in Surrey.

== Release delays ==
In July 2009, "creative differences" led Beeban Kidron to quit during post-production; her husband, screenwriter Lee Hall, had left the production earlier. According to The Times, Kidron said: "I worked on the film for as long as I could and as hard as I could and then I had to walk away. It was very wounding." A 100-print release was scheduled for February 2010, but never happened.

== Reactions ==
The people depicted in the film have had a range of reactions to it.

In July 2007, in a piece for The Guardian, feminist author Germaine Greer vehemently expressed her displeasure at being depicted, writing, "You used to have to die before assorted hacks started munching your remains and modelling a new version of you out of their own excreta." Greer refused to be involved with the film, just as she declined to read Neville's memoir before it was published (he had offered to change anything she found offensive). She did not want to meet with Emma Booth, who portrays her in the film, and concluded her article with her only advice for the actress: "Get an honest job." Booth had just told The Brisbane Times: "It's going to be a bit scary playing her. Germaine is this ballsy lady. I am sure she is going to hate me."

In contrast to Greer, Louise Ferrier met with director Kidron to discuss the film at length, and expressed the opinion that Kidron was "certainly working to make it authentic." Ferrier said she was unfamiliar with the work of Sienna Miller, the actress portraying her.

Publisher Felix Dennis was also more cooperative, and agreed to meet up with Chris O'Dowd, the actor who portrays him in the film. "He was an incredibly charismatic man", O'Dowd stated.

== Test screening reviews ==
Several advance reviews of Hippie Hippie Shake have surfaced across the Internet. Ain't It Cool News interviewed a person who had attended a test screening, who said: "There are some predictable scenes, some hammy acting, some bad jokes, but they couldn't spoil my enjoyment. I'm sorry, but I really liked it." The viewer was especially impressed by Sienna Miller, saying, "And yes, there is full-frontal nudity from Sienna. She has a natural, un-made-up look for most of the film, one might even say uglified in places. But when kneeling in a garden drenched in daisies and with a beatific expression on her face, she poses for an 'alternative' Oz centrefold – she is stunningly, stunningly beautiful." Jandy Stone from The Frame opined: "All the actors carry their parts well." Of the film, she concluded that "since there's no release date in sight yet, they may well improve it into quite a decent '60s biopic."

Matt Robinson said: "Starring Cillian Murphy and Sienna Miller the film captures the time period effectively presenting both drama, sex and drugs against a setting of media scrutiny and restrictions." He wrote: "Colourful, funny and dramatic this is not only a good film it is educational too. A good document of history that many journalists and nonjournalists will enjoy." Felix Dennis, quoted in The Times of 21 July 2009, wrote: "I was eventually, after asking several times, permitted to see a copy of the film, which I think is quite possibly the worst film to be made in the 21st century... an absolute stinker...a dog's breakfast."

== See also ==
- The Trials of Oz, a BBC dramatisation of the Oz obscenity trial.
