= David Widgery =

British writer

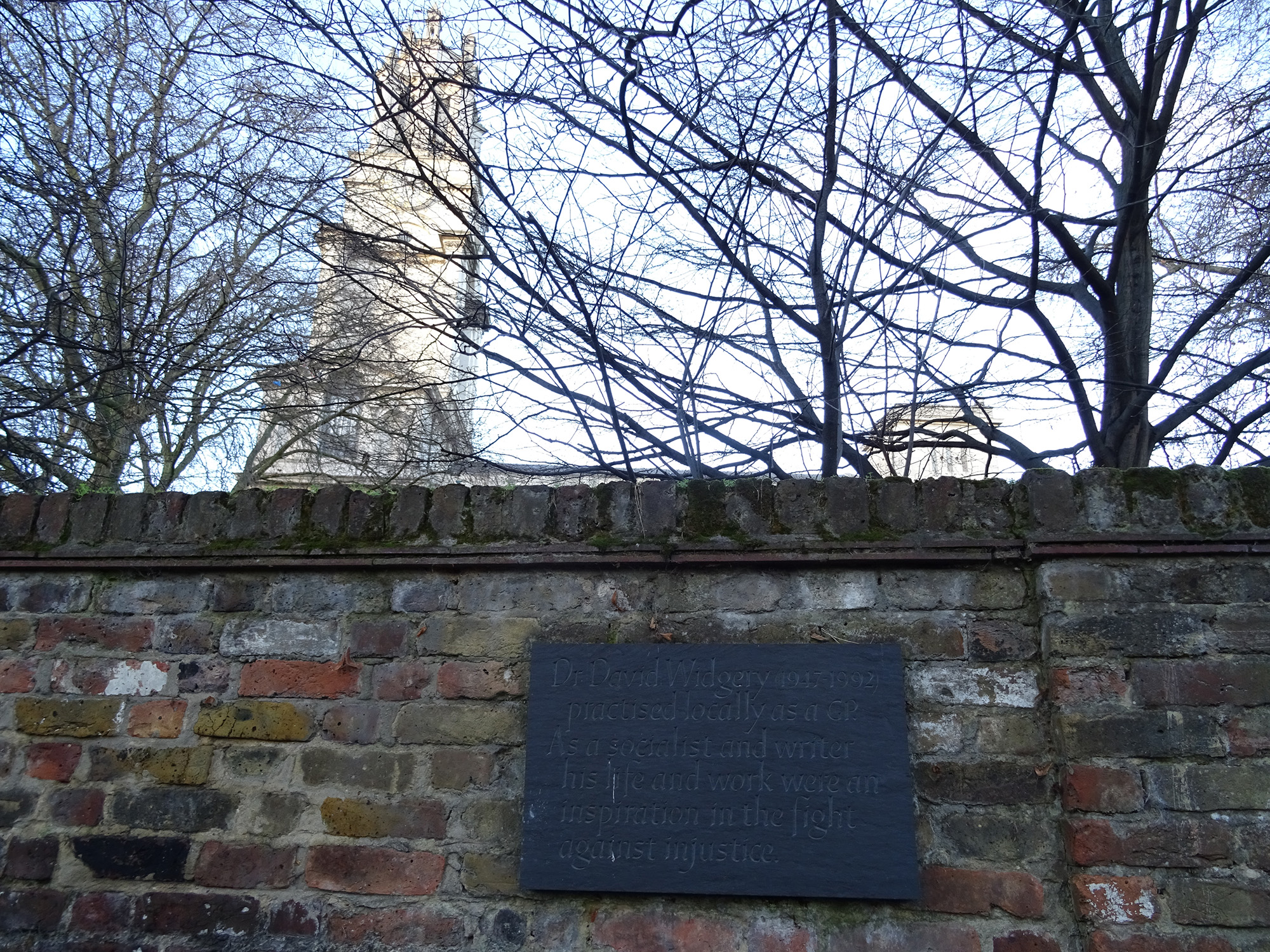
"Dr David Widgery (1947–1992) practised locally as a GP. As a socialist and writer his life and work were an inspiration in the fight against injustice" – St Anne's Church, Three Colt Street, Poplar, London E14 7HA

David Widgery (27 April 1947 – 26 October 1992) was a British Marxist writer, journalist, polemicist, physician, and activist.

== Biography ==
Widgery was born in Barnet and grew up in Maidenhead, Berkshire. He contracted polio as a child and was expelled from sixth form for publishing a magazine.

In 1965, Widgery met Allen Ginsberg, then visited Watts, where he encountered the civil rights movement, followed by Cuba. On return to Britain, he studied medicine at the Royal Free Hospital Medical School before writing for the New Statesman and Oz magazines, becoming co-editor of Oz during 1971.

Widgery joined the International Socialists in 1967, remaining in the group when it became the Socialist Workers Party in 1977. He began working at Bethnal Green Hospital in 1972, worked at St Leonard's Hospital in the late 1970s and later in the decade he published his first book, The Left in Britain, 1956–68.

Widgery contributed to Ink, Time Out and City Limits, also writing for the New Statesman, Socialist Review, International Socialism and New Society.

He also presented a paper at the ninth symposium of the National Deviancy Conference in Sheffield (7–8 January 1972) on "The Politics of the Underground".

His books include The Chatto Book of Dissent (1991), an anthology of dissident writings co-edited with Michael Rosen, Some Lives!: A GP's East End (1991), the story of his experience as a doctor in London's East End, The National Health: A Radical Perspective, and Beating Time (1986), an account of the Rock Against Racism movement of the late 1970s.

When Widgery died, aged 45, excess alcohol, barbiturates and pethidine were found in his bloodstream. One obituary described Widgery as "a radical humanist intellectual on permanent loan to revolutionary socialism."

== Publications ==
- Widgery, D. (1976), The Left in Britain, 1956-68 (Peregrine Books)
- Widgery, D. (ed) (1980), The Book of the Year: September 1979 to September 1980 (Inklinks)
- Widgery, D., The National Health: A Radical Perspective
- Widgery, D. (1986), Beating Time
- Widgery, D. (1989), Preserving Disorder (Essays on Society & Culture) (Pluto Press)
- Widgery, D. and Rosen, M. (eds) (1991), The Chatto Book of Dissent (Chatto)
- Widgery, D. and Shelton, S. (1991), Some Lives!: A GP's East End, London: Sinclair Stevenson.
- Widgery, D. (1991), Marketa Luskacova: Photographs of Spitalfields (Whitechapel Art Gallery)
