= Richard Walsh (Australian publisher) =

Australian publisher

- Born: John Richard Walsh; 21 July 1941 (age 85); Sydney, New South Wales, Australia
- Occupations: Publisher, writer, company director
- Writing career
- Notable works: Great Australian eulogies Executive material Ferretabilia: life and times of Nation Review; No Holts barred

Richard Walsh (born John Richard Walsh; born 21 July 1941) is an Australian publisher, editor, company director, media consultant, lecturer, broadcaster and journalist. For many years he ran the publishing and bookselling firm Angus & Robertson and later he headed the media company Australian Consolidated Press. In those roles he was "one of the most dominant figures in Australian publishing from the early seventies".

== Education, OZ magazine ==
Richard Walsh was educated at Barker College and the University of Sydney and graduated with degrees in arts and medicine. He never practised medicine, but instead became a copywriter at advertising firm J. Walter Thompson.

In 1963, while still a university student and editor of Sydney University's Honi Soit student magazine, Walsh co-founded and co-edited the satirical underground alternative OZ magazine. Together with co-editors Richard Neville and Martin Sharp, he was sentenced to prison for obscenity (the convictions were quashed on appeal).

Looking back in 2006 on his involvement with OZ, Walsh commented:

OZ was born in the bland, conservative world of the early ’60s. It was the Menzies era: Australia was white Anglo Saxon, culturally barren and very, very insular. The Queen, the church and the RSL ruled the day. If you did anything radical, you were a communist. To call for the White Australia policy to end was a betrayal of our boys killed by the Japanese. Like lots of young people, we wanted to take the place by the scruff of the neck and change it.

He also wrote scripts for the satirical television show The Mavis Bramston Show.

== POL magazine ==
In 1968 Walsh became founding editor of POL, an important magazine of its era that has been described as "distinctively Australian, lively and intelligently sexy".

Walsh originally envisaged POL as "glossy, up-market women's magazine"..., something like Queen or Nova in Great Britain which had no counterparts in Australia at that time". He subtitled the first issue of magazine "The Australian Woman" but in subsequent issues he changed the subtitle to "The Monthly Magazine for Modern Australian Women", this change signalling "Walsh's wish to target women readers who were forward-looking at a time when he saw Australians breaking many of the bonds of conservatism."

During the leadership of Walsh, POL attracted some of Australia's greatest journalistic talent, with issues guest edited by such as Germaine Greer (1972) and Richard Neville (1974) and writers including Charmian Clift.

From 1968 to 1970 Walsh was also Creative Group Head at the advertising firm J. Walter Thompson.

== Nation Review ==
In the years 1971–1978 Walsh edited the Sunday Review (later renamed the Nation Review), a weekly newspaper noted for its mocking left-of-centre political commentary, its offbeat cartoons, and its iconoclastic reviews, with a stable of fine writers and young and talented cartoonists. According to Walsh, his aim with the Nation Review was to take part in the creation of a "more stimulating, more sophisticated and more passionate Australia". Referring to the Nation Review under Walsh's editorship, John McLaren wrote: "As [the Nation Review] developed..., it consciously adopted the role of an alternative press, publishing news that others ignored and cultivating a brash larrikin style of writing that bruised many sensitivities but also recalled some of the older traditions of Australian journalism going back through Smith's Weekly to the early Bulletin".

== Angus & Robertson (1972 – 1986) ==
In 1972 Walsh was appointed as chief executive of the major Australian publishing and bookselling firm Angus & Robertson (A&R). During his 14-year tenure Walsh promoted a strategy of mass market books (in areas such as self-help, health and Australiana) in a successful attempt to improve the financial fortunes of the firm.

The task that faced Walsh when he first arrived at Angus & Robertson was daunting. "While still recognisable as a former leviathan, [the firm] was in fact close to death," he recounted in a case study published in 2006.

Walsh concentrated on only general publishing rather than both general and educational publishing, reined in maverick editors with their own pet publishing programs, introduced a number of seductively designed book series, offered sale-or-return conditions to booksellers, published attractive books for younger readers, and pioneered the novelization of Australian book and film series. As a result, Walsh was credited with building A&R into "a highly profitable company and by far the most prolific publisher of Australian books."

He has wryly noted that while doing so he had received a chilly welcome from the establishment of the Australian publishing world:

The thirty-something hyperactive Wunderkind ... had neither gravitas nor political conservatism to recommend him, and appeared to have undergone a tact bypass. Every change and every innovation at the new A&R was greeted with howls of disbelief and rage.

== Australian Consolidated Press (1986 – 1996) ==
In 1986 Walsh was appointed director and publisher of Australian Consolidated Press (ACP). Walsh oversaw the firm's more than 60 magazines, including The Bulletin, The Australian Women's Weekly, Cleo, Australian House & Garden, and Wheels. Owned by Kerry Packer, ACP controlled a huge share of Australia's magazine market. After ACP's takeover in 1988 of its rival Fairfax's magazines, Walsh was responsible for even more top magazines including Woman's Day, People, Dolly and Good Housekeeping. In 1990 he was promoted to chief executive.

== Current activities ==
A 2015 news item from the University of Wollongong reported as follows: "Richard Walsh lectures part-time at Sydney’s Macleay College and is the author of eight books. He is also a business consultant at the software developer, itechne, and Consultant Publisher at Allen & Unwin."

He has also been a director of HWW, Text Media, and Cinema Plus.

As of 2018, he was lecturing at the University of Sydney.

== Public service ==
Walsh was a founding member of the Literature Board of the Australia Council (1973–76), the President of the Australian Book Publishers' Association (1986), the Chairman of the Nimrod Theatre, the Chairman of the Australian National Commission for UNESCO (1989–93), the Chairman of the Quest for Life Foundation (1991–94), and a member of the Library Council of New South Wales (1992–95).

== Awards and recognition ==
In 2008 the Association of Magazine Publishers of Australia conferred a Lifetime Achievement Award on Walsh for his "Outstanding Contribution to the Magazine Industry", noting as follows:

Richard Walsh’s appointment to ACP, firstly as editor-in-chief, then CEO & chairman, resulted in numerous launches, circulation growth and profit rises for the company. Under Walsh’s leadership, ACP became Australia’s largest publisher, followed by highly successful forays into New Zealand and South East Asia."

At the Australian Book Industry Awards in May 2019 Walsh was presented with the Lloyd O’Neill hall of fame award for services to the Australian book industry.

== Books by Richard Walsh ==
- Reboot: A Democracy Makeover to Empower Australia's Voters. Richard Walsh. Carlton, Victoria : Melbourne University Press, 2017.
- Traditional Australian verse : the essential collection.' Edited by Richard Walsh. Crows Nest, N.S.W. : Allen & Unwin, 2009.
- Great Australian eulogies. Edited by Richard Walsh. Crows Nest, N.S.W. : Allen & Unwin, 2008.
- Executive material : nine of Australia's top CEO's in conversation with Richard Walsh. Crows Nest, N.S.W. : Allen & Unwin, 2002.
- Ferretabilia : life and times of Nation Review. Compiled by Richard Walsh. St Lucia, Qld.: University of Queensland Press, 1993.
- Gortn the ACT : the year's best cartoons from Petty, Tanner, Molnar, Weg, King, Collette, Eyre Jnr and others. Selection and text by Richard Walsh. Melbourne : Sun Books, [1968].
- Dr. Whitlam's deservedly famous Gough syrup : an anthology of the year's best cartoons, being a universal panacea for the nation's ills, comprising one part each of the following: Petty, Molnar, Tanner, Rigby, Weg, Collette, King, Eyre jnr., Sharp. Compounded under the general supervision of Richard Walsh. Melbourne : Sun Books, [1967].
- No Holts barred : the year's best cartoons from Petty, Molnar, Tanner, Sharp, Rigby, Weg, Benier, Collette, Eyre Jnr, Mercier, and others. Selection and text by Richard Walsh. Melbourne : Sun Books, 1966.

== Article by Richard Walsh ==
- "A Note from a Victim", in: Geoffrey Dutton and Max Harris, eds., Australia's Censorship Crisis. Melbourne: Sun Books, 1970, pp. 131–133.
