= Oz (magazine) =

Australian satirical magazine

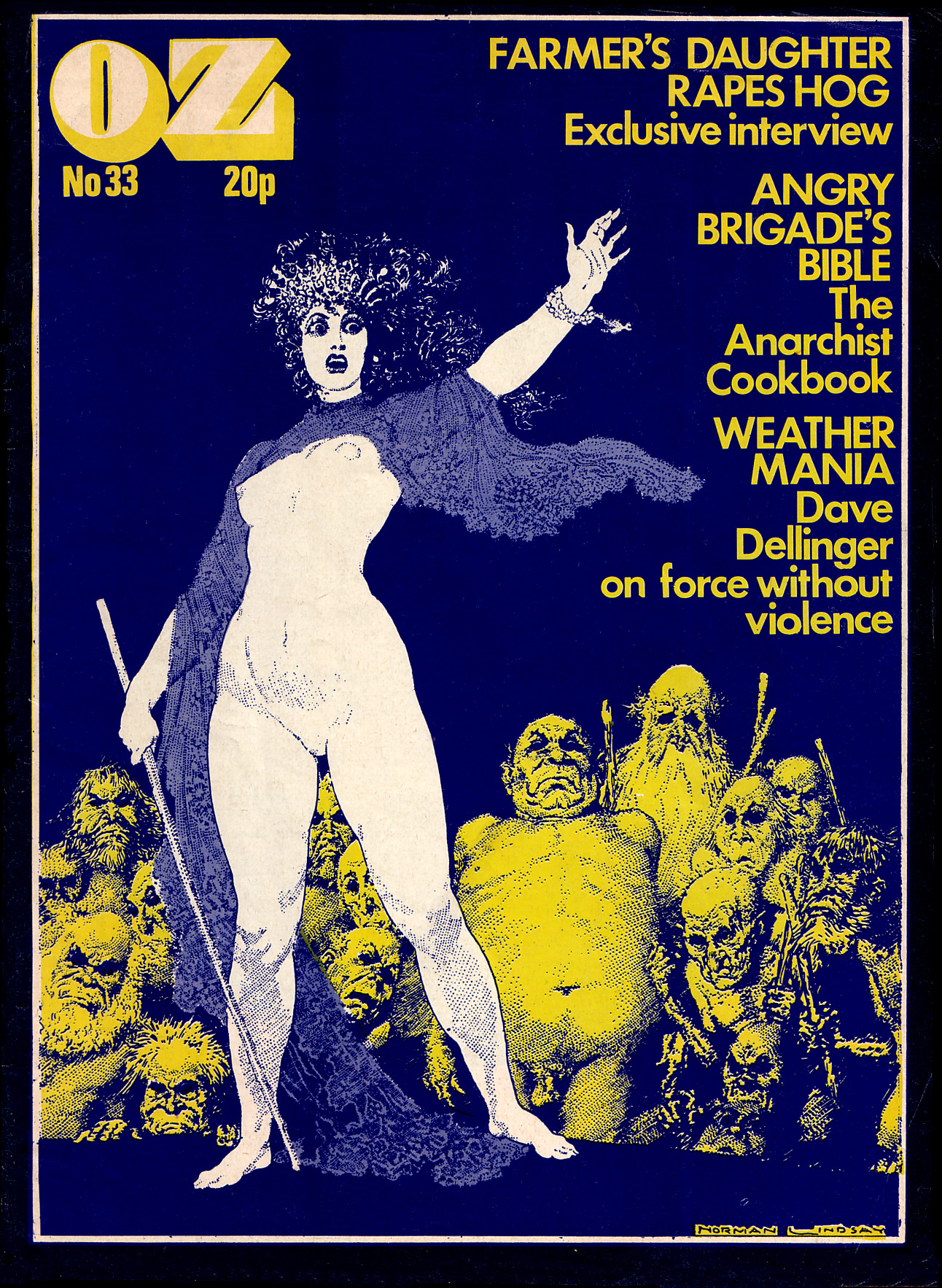
Oz (London) No.33, February 1971. Cover image by Norman Lindsay

Oz was an independently published, alternative/underground magazine associated with the international counterculture of the 1960s. Editor Richard Neville first published the magazine in Sydney in 1963, launching a parallel version of Oz in London from 1967.

In both Australia and the UK, the creators of Oz were prosecuted on charges of obscenity. A 1963 charge was dealt with expeditiously when, upon the advice of a solicitor, Neville and Sydney co-editors Richard Walsh and Martin Sharp pleaded guilty. In two later trials, 1964 Australia and 1971 UK, the magazine's editors were acquitted on appeal, after initially being found guilty and sentenced to harsh jail terms. The Australian publication folded in 1969, while Neville's London co-editors Jim Anderson and, later, Felix Dennis, then Roger Hutchinson published the British Oz until 1973.

== Oz in Australia ==
=== Launch ===
Oz Sydney
- The controversial cover of Oz Sydney, No.6, February 1964
- Editor: Richard Neville, Richard Walsh, Martin Sharp
- Staff writers: Peter Grose, Robert Hughes, Bob Ellis
- Categories: Satirical humour
- Frequency: Monthly
- Circulation: 6,000
- Founder: Richard Neville
- Founded: 1963; 63 years ago
- First issue: 1 April 1963
- Final issue: 1969
- Country: Australia
- Based in: Sydney
- Language: English
- Website: ro.uow.edu.au/ozsydney

The original Australian editorial team included university students Neville, Walsh and Sharp, and Peter Grose, a cadet journalist from Sydney's Daily Mirror. Other early contributors included art critic Robert Hughes and future author Bob Ellis. Neville, Walsh and Sharp had each been involved in student magazines at their respective Sydney tertiary campuses: Neville had edited the University of New South Wales student magazine Tharunka, Walsh edited its University of Sydney counterpart Honi Soit and Sharp had contributed to the short-lived student magazine The Arty Wild Oat while studying at the National Art School in East Sydney. Influenced by the radical comedy of Lenny Bruce, Neville and friends decided to found a "magazine of dissent".

The 16-page first issue, published on April Fools' Day 1963, caused a sensation, selling 6,000 copies by lunchtime of publication day. It parodied the Sydney Morning Herald (and was even printed on The Herald's own presses, adding to its credibility) and led with a front-page hoax about the collapse of the Sydney Harbour Bridge. It also featured a centre spread on the history of the chastity belt and a story on abortion – based on Neville's own experience of arranging a termination of pregnancy for a girlfriend; abortion was then still illegal in New South Wales. These stories though, would soon lead to the magazine's first round of obscenity charges, but there were also more immediate consequences. As a result of the controversy generated by the abortion story, the Sydney Daily Mirror cancelled its advertising contract, it also threatened to sack Peter Grose from his cadetship unless he resigned from Oz and the Maritime Services Board evicted Oz from its office in The Rocks.

=== Early issues and first obscenity charge ===
In succeeding issues (and in its later London version) Oz gave pioneering coverage to contentious issues such as censorship, homosexuality, police brutality, the Australian government's White Australia policy and Australia's involvement in the Vietnam War, as well as regularly satirising public figures, up to and including Australian Prime Minister Robert Menzies.

In mid-1963, shortly after the publication of issue No.3, Neville, Walsh and Grose were summoned on charges of distributing an obscene publication; the shock of the charges caused Walsh's deeply religious father to suffer a serious heart attack, so their family solicitor arranged for the case to be adjourned until September 1963 but he advised the trio that, as first offenders, they could avoid having their conviction recorded if they pleaded guilty.

Word soon went around the publishing trade; after their current printers pulled Issue 4 from the presses Neville shopped around for a new printer but he was turned down by a dozen other companies until, on Sharp's advice, he approached maverick writer-publisher Francis James, editor of the Anglican Press, who agreed to take it on. When Neville, Walsh and Grose appeared in court on 3 September 1963 the Walshes' solicitor pleaded guilty on their behalf; each was fined £20 and their convictions were recorded, an outcome that was to have serious repercussions in their second trial.

With end-of-year exams looming, Oz issue No.5 was postponed until the Christmas break. When eventually issued, it included a scathing satire on the ongoing police harassment of gay people. "The Stiff Arm of the Law" (which became a regular feature on police misconduct) featured a parody of a police report in which incriminating sections of a supposed account of an officer's real actions in a gay-bashing incident were crossed out and replaced with far more anodyne language, e.g. in the line "I was at Phillip Street Station in my homo hunting togs", the words "homo hunting togs" were crossed out and replaced with the handwritten words "plain clothes", "this little bastard" with "a youth", and "I myself punched him several times" was amended to read "I was punched several times", and so on. As a result of this perceived slight to their integrity, police seized 140 copies of Oz from a Kings Cross, NSW newsagent and took them to a magistrate, who ordered them to be burned.

Two other items in these early issues incurred the wrath of the NSW police. One was Martin Sharp's ribald satirical poem about youths gatecrashing a party, entitled "The Word Flashed Around The Arms"; the other was the Oz No.6 cover photograph (pictured at right), which depicted Neville and others pretending to urinate into a wall fountain created by sculptor Tom Bass, which was mounted in the street facade of the Sydney offices of the P&O shipping line and which had recently been unveiled by Prime Minister Menzies.

=== Second obscenity charge ===
In April 1964 Neville, Walsh and Sharp were again charged with obscenity, but the situation was greatly complicated by the fact that they had already pleaded guilty in their first trial, and this previous conviction would count heavily against them in sentencing if they were found guilty on the new charges. As soon as the case began they were confronted by the blatant bias and hostility of the magistrate hearing the case, Mr Gerald Locke, SM.

To the dismay of the Oz team and their friends and family, Locke decided to make an example of them, sentencing them to three to six months in prison with hard labour, but they were released on bail pending an appeal. Their supporters decided to raise money for the defence fund with a benefit concert, which was held at the Sydney University Theatre on 15 November 1964, featuring Sydney garage-punk band The Missing Links, members of the popular satirical TV sketch series The Mavis Bramston Show and actor Leonard Teale (then starring in the popular TV police drama Homicide), who recited a "surfie" parody of Clancy of the Overflow.

The case created a storm of controversy, but the convictions were overturned on appeal mainly because – as in their subsequent British trial – the appeal judge found that Locke had misdirected the jury and made remarks that were found to have been prejudicial to the defence's case.

=== Sydney's underworld ===
In subsequent issues Oz made several investigations into the murky realms of Sydney's underworld. One celebrated feature delved into the illegal abortion rackets which were then flourishing in Sydney (and around Australia), because at that time abortion was still illegal for all but the most exceptional cases, and corrupt police were widely believed to be running lucrative protection rackets that netted them substantial sums.

In 1965 Oz editor Richard Neville had a close encounter with Sydney's alleged "Mr Big" of organised crime, Lenny McPherson, a notorious criminal who was at that time well on his way to becoming Sydney's most powerful underworld figure, thanks in part to a systematic program of public assassinations of his rivals.

Late in the year, Oz published a feature called "The Oz Guide to Sydney's Underworld", which was based on information from two local journalists, and which included a "top 20" list of Sydney major criminals. The list deliberately left the number 1 spot blank, but at number 2 was the name "Len" (i.e. McPherson) who was described as a "fence" and a "fizz-gig" (police informant). Soon after the list was published, McPherson made a visit to Neville's house in Paddington, NSW; ostensibly he wanted to find out whether the Oz editors were part of a rival gang, but he also made it clear to Neville that he objected to being described as a "fizz".

The Top 20 list also reportedly played a part in the death of Sydney criminal Jacky Steele, who was shot in Woollahra in November 1965. Steele – who had been trying to take over protection rackets controlled by McPherson – survived for almost a month before dying from his wounds, but before he died he told police that McPherson had ordered his execution because Steele had bought multiple copies of Oz and had made great play of the fact that McPherson was not number 1. Oz revealed this in a subsequent issue, which contained extracts from the minutes of a confidential meeting of Sydney detectives, held on 1 December 1965, which had been leaked to the magazine by an underworld source.

=== Oz in Australia ends ===
Sharp and Neville left for London in February 1966, while Walsh returned to his studies. He continued to publish a reduced edition of Sydney Oz, which ran until 1969 and included material submitted by Neville and Sharp from London. In the 1970s he edited POL magazine and Nation Review, and later became managing director of leading Australian media company Australian Consolidated Press, owned by Kerry Packer.

== Oz in the UK ==
Oz London
- Oz London, No.3, May 1967. Cover by Martin Sharp
- Editor: Richard Neville, Jim Anderson, later Felix Dennis
- Staff writers: Germaine Greer, Philippe Mora, Lillian Roxon, Michael Leunig, Angelo Quattrocchi, Barney Bubbles, David Widgery
- Photographer: Robert Whitaker
- Categories: Satirical humour
- Frequency: Monthly
- Circulation: 80,000 (c. 1970)
- Founder: Richard Neville, Martin Sharp, Jim Anderson
- Founded: 1967; 59 years ago
- First issue: 1967
- Final issue: 1973
- Country: England
- Based in: London
- Language: English

In early 1966 Neville and Sharp travelled to the UK and in early 1967, with fellow Australian Jim Anderson, they founded the London Oz. Contributors included Germaine Greer, artist and filmmaker Philippe Mora, illustrator Stewart Mackinnon, photographer Robert Whitaker, journalist Lillian Roxon, cartoonist Michael Leunig, Angelo Quattrocchi, Barney Bubbles and David Widgery.

With access to new print stocks, including metallic foils, new fluorescent inks and the freedom of layout offered by the offset printing system, Sharp's artistic skills came to the fore and Oz quickly won renown as one of the most visually exciting publications of its day. Several editions of Oz included dazzling psychedelic wraparound or pull-out posters by Sharp, London design duo Hapshash and the Coloured Coat and others; these instantly became sought-after collector's items and now command high prices. Another innovation was the cover of Oz No.11, which included a collection of detachable adhesive labels, printed in either red, yellow or green. The all-graphic "Magic Theatre" edition (Oz No.16, November 1968), overseen by Sharp and Mora, has been described by British author Jonathon Green as "arguably the greatest achievement of the entire British underground press." During this period Sharp also created the two famous psychedelic album covers for the group Cream, Disraeli Gears and Wheels of Fire.

Sharp's involvement gradually decreased during 1968-69 and the "Magic Theatre" edition was one of his last major contributions to the magazine. In his place, young Londoner Felix Dennis, who had been selling issues on the street, was eventually brought in as Neville and Anderson's new partner. The magazine regularly enraged the British establishment with a range of left-field stories including heavy critical coverage of the Vietnam War and the anti-war movement, discussions of drugs, sex and alternative lifestyles, and contentious political stories, such as the magazine's revelations about the torture of citizens under the rule of the military junta in Greece.

=== UK obscenity trial and appeal ===
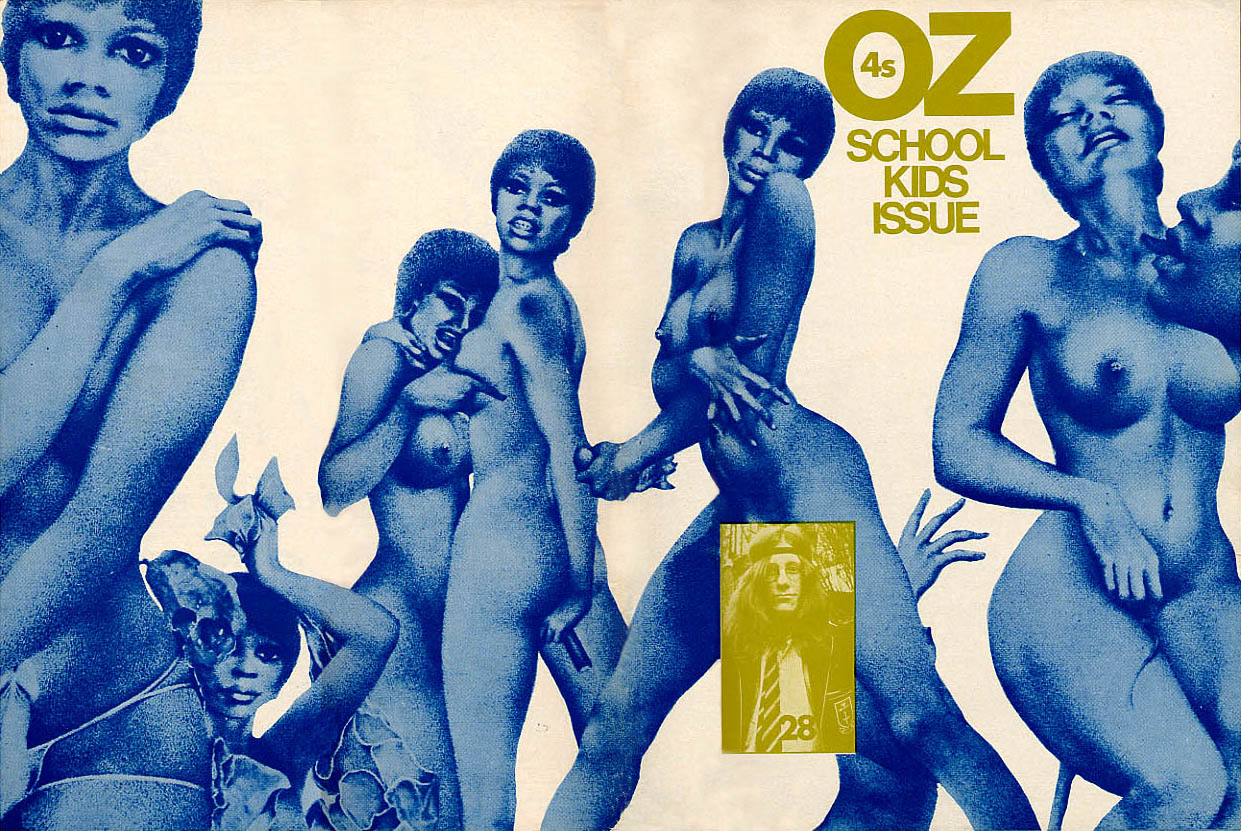
Oz London, No.28: the Schoolkids Issue

In 1970, reacting to criticism that Oz had lost touch with youth, the editors put a notice in the magazine inviting "school kids" to edit an issue. The opportunity was taken up by around 20 secondary school students (including Charles Shaar Murray and Deyan Sudjic), who were responsible for Oz No.28 (May 1970), generally known as "Schoolkids Oz". This term was widely misunderstood to mean that it was intended for schoolchildren, whereas it was an issue that had been created by them. As Richard Neville said in his opening statement, other issues had been assembled by gay people and members of the Female Liberation Movement. One of the resulting articles was a highly sexualised Rupert Bear parody. It was created by 15-year-old schoolboy Vivian Berger by pasting the head of Rupert onto the lead character of an X-rated satirical cartoon by Robert Crumb.

Oz was one of several 'underground' publications targeted by the Obscene Publications Squad, and their offices had already been raided on several occasions, but the conjunction of schoolchildren and what some viewed as obscene material set the scene for the Oz obscenity trial of 1971. In one key respect it was a virtual re-run of the second Australian trial – the judicial instruction was clearly aimed at securing a conviction, and like Gerald Locke in Sydney, the judge hearing the London case, Judge Michael Argyle, exhibited signs of bias against the defendants. However the British trial was given a far more dangerous edge because the prosecution employed an archaic charge against Neville, Dennis and Anderson—"conspiracy to corrupt public morals"—which, in theory, carried a maximum sentence of life imprisonment.

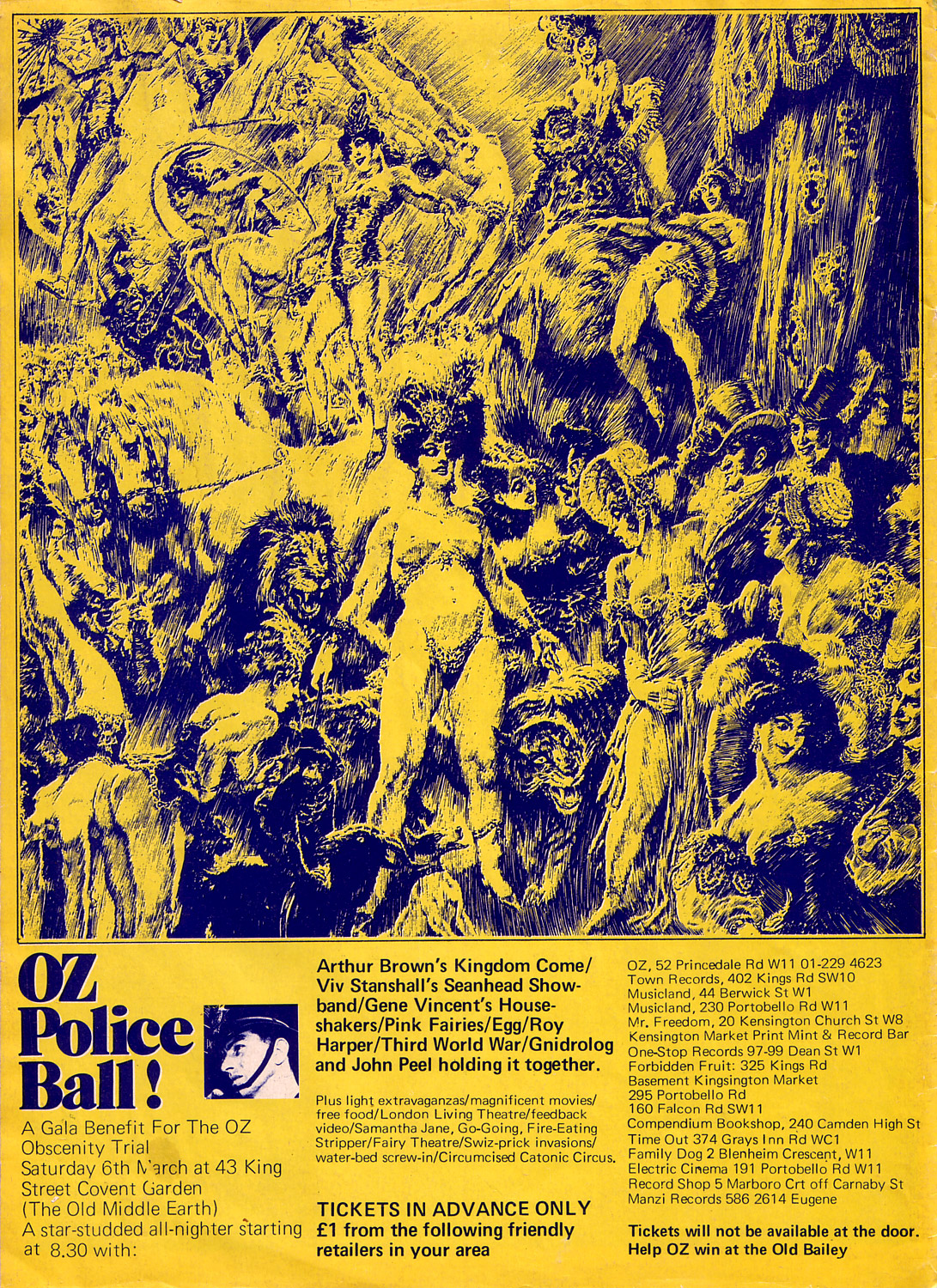
Oz London, No.33, back cover advertising "A Gala Benefit for the Oz Obscenity Trial"

After being turned down by several leading lawyers, Dennis and Anderson secured the services of barrister and writer John Mortimer, QC (creator of the Rumpole of the Bailey series) who was assisted by his Australian-born junior counsel Geoffrey Robertson; Neville chose to represent himself. At the opening of the trial in June 1971 Mortimer stated that "... [the] case stands at the crossroads of our liberty, at the boundaries of our freedom to think and draw and write what we please".

To enable them to focus on their defence, they engaged the Australian journalist (and future Labour politician) Peter Steedman as managing editor.

For the defence, this specifically concerned the treatment of dissent and dissenters, about the control of ideas and suppressing the messages of social resistance communicated by Oz in issue No.28. The charges read out in the central criminal court stated "[that the defendants] conspiring with certain other young persons to produce a magazine containing obscene, lewd, indecent and sexually perverted articles, cartoons and drawings with intent to debauch and corrupt the morals of children and other young persons and to arouse and implant in their minds lustful and perverted ideas". According to Mr Brian Leary, prosecuting, "It dealt with homosexuality, lesbianism, sadism, perverted sexual practices and drug taking".

John Lennon and Yoko Ono joined the protest march against the prosecution and organised the recording of "God Save Us" by the ad hoc group Elastic Oz Band to raise funds and gain publicity. Lennon explained how the song title changed from "God Save Oz" to "God Save Us".

The trial was, at the time, the longest obscenity trial in British legal history, and it was the first time that an obscenity charge was combined with the charge of conspiring to corrupt public morals. Defence witnesses included clinical psychologist Lionel Haward, artist Feliks Topolski, comedian Marty Feldman, artist and drugs activist Caroline Coon, DJ John Peel, musician and writer George Melly, legal philosopher Ronald Dworkin and academic Edward de Bono.

At the conclusion of the trial the "Oz Three" were found not guilty on the conspiracy charge, but they were convicted of two lesser offences and sentenced to imprisonment; although Dennis was given a lesser sentence because the judge, Michael Argyle, considered that Dennis was "very much less intelligent" than the others. Shortly after the verdicts were handed down, they were taken to prison and their long hair forcibly cut, an act which caused an even greater stir on top of the already considerable outcry surrounding the trial and verdict.

The best known images of the trial come from the committal hearing, at which Neville, Dennis and Anderson all appeared, wearing rented schoolgirl costumes.

At the appeal trial (where the defendants appeared wearing long wigs) it was found that Judge Argyle had grossly misdirected the jury on numerous occasions and the defence also alleged that Berger, who was called as a prosecution witness, had been harassed and assaulted by police. The convictions were overturned. Years later, Felix Dennis told author Jonathon Green that on the night before the appeal was heard, the Oz editors were taken to a secret meeting with the Chief Justice, Lord Widgery, who reportedly said that Argyle had made a "fat mess" of the trial, and informed them that they would be acquitted, but insisted that they had to agree to give up work on Oz. Dennis also stated that, in his opinion, MPs Tony Benn and Michael Foot had interceded with Widgery on their behalf.

Despite their supposed undertaking to Lord Widgery, Oz continued after the trial, and thanks to the intense public interest the trial generated, its circulation briefly rose to 80,000. However its popularity faded over the next two years and by the time the last issue (Oz No.48) was published in November 1973 Oz Publications was £20,000 in debt and the magazine had "no readership worth the name".

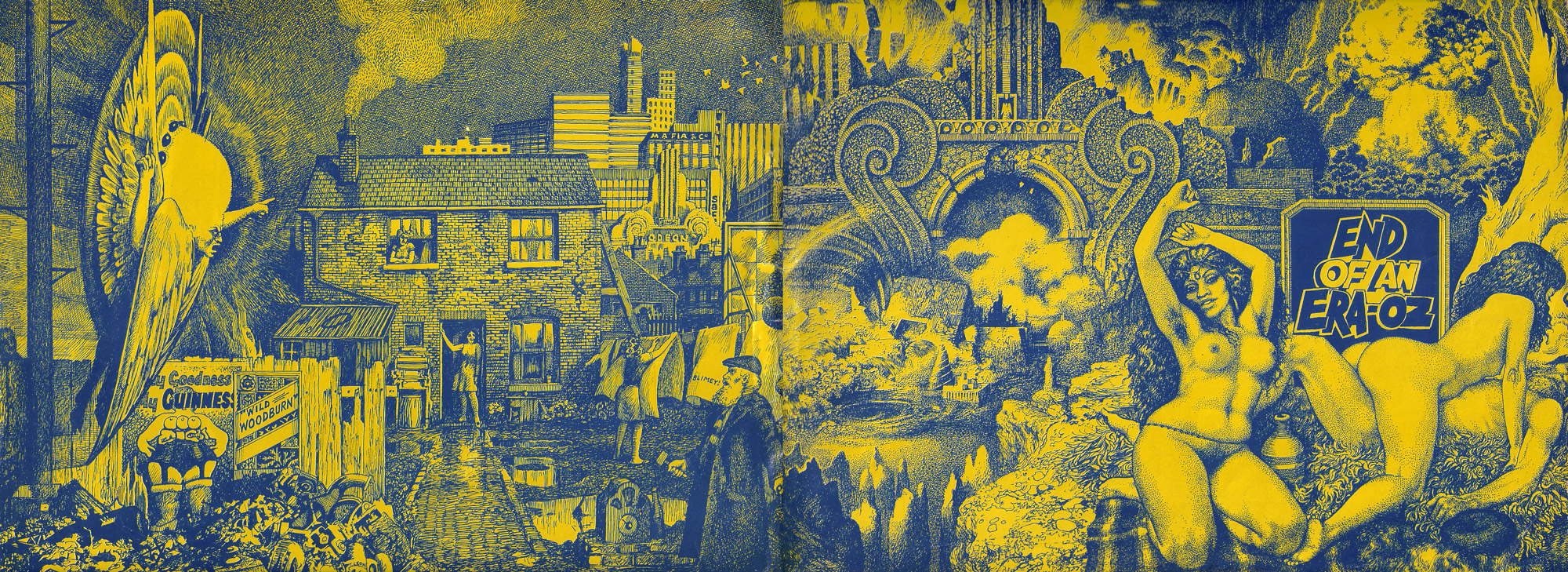
Oz London, No.31, November 1970, pp. 1 and 2

== Legacy ==
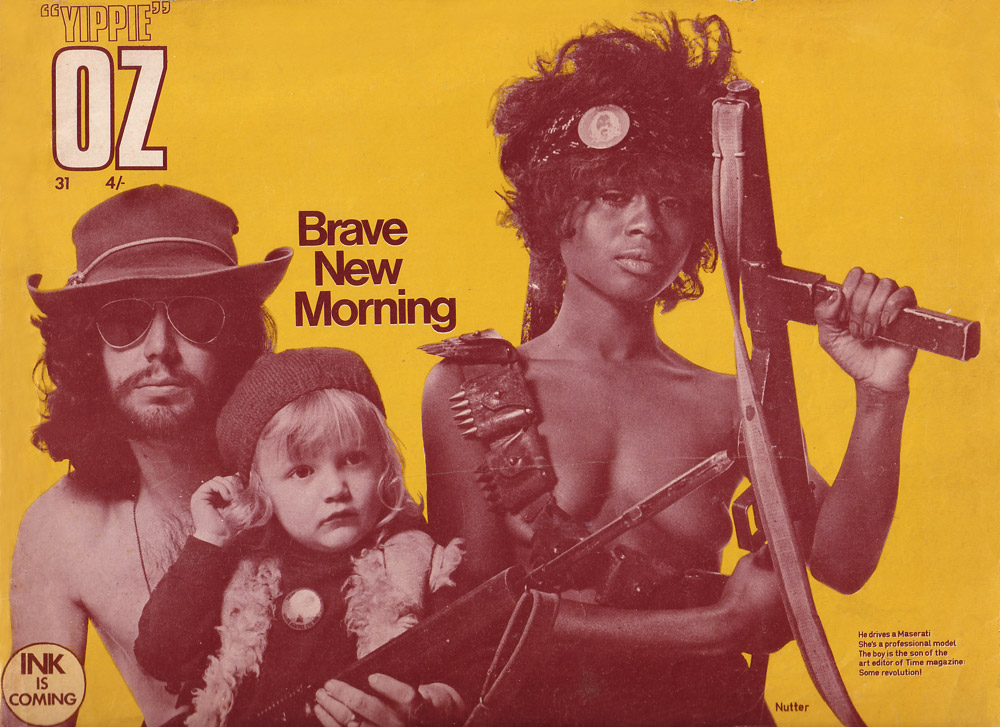
Oz London, No.31. The text in the lower right corner says: "He drives a Maserati / She's a professional model / The boy is the son of the / art editor of Time magazine / Some revolution!"

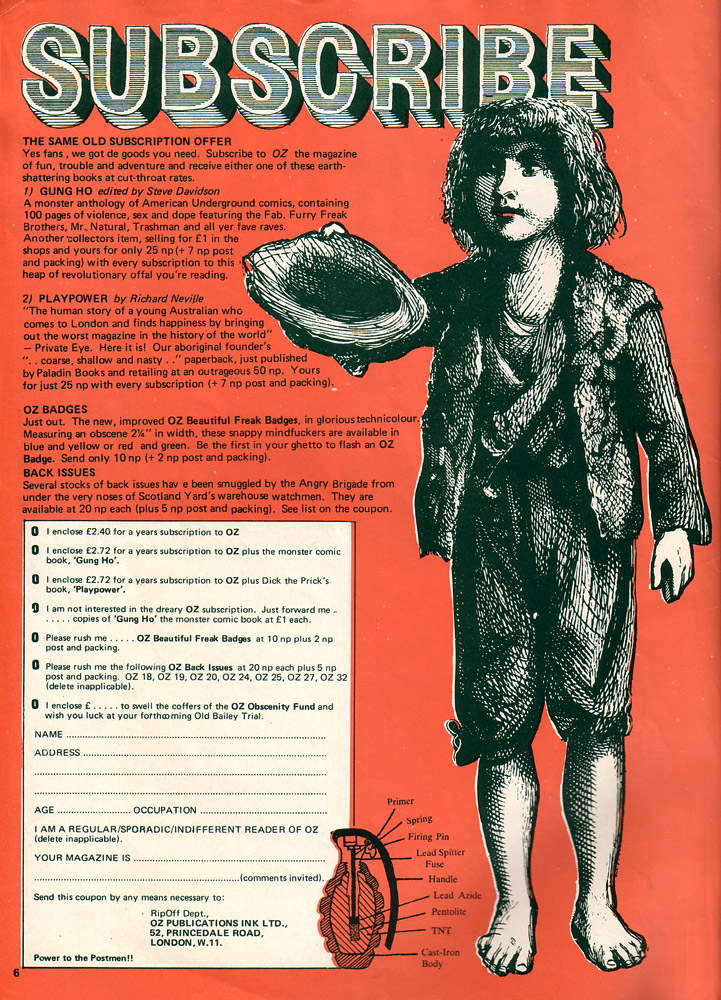
Oz London, No.33, p. 6

Partly because of its suppression by both Australian and British authorities (many editions of London Oz were banned in Australia), copies of both incarnations of the magazine are now rare and the British issues command high prices among collectors – individual copies of the most sought-after editions are now worth several hundred pounds each.

Dennis was stung by personal comments made by the trial judge that he was of limited ability and a dupe of the other defendants; he later became one of Britain's wealthiest and most prominent independent publishers as owner of Dennis Publishing (publisher of Maxim and other magazines), and in 2004 released a book of original poetry. In 1995, Justice Argyle reiterated allegations about Dennis in The Spectator magazine. As this was outside court privilege, Dennis was able to successfully sue the magazine, which agreed to pay £10,000 to charity. Dennis refrained from suing Argyle personally: "Oh, I don't want to make him a martyr of the Right: there's no glory to be had in suing an 80-year-old man and taking his house away from him. It was just a totally obvious libel."

Neville eventually returned to Australia, where he became a successful author, commentator and public speaker, later styling himself as a "futurist". His books include The Life and Crimes of Charles Sobraj (1979), a critically praised account of the life of French/Vietnamese serial killer Charles Sobhraj, who preyed on Western tourists travelling on Asia's so-called "hippie trail" in the 1970s; the book was later adapted for a successful TV mini-series starring Art Malik. In 1995, Hippie Hippie Shake, a memoir of his years with Oz, was published. In 2007, Beeban Kidron directed a film adaptation which was to have been released in 2010. The film starred Cillian Murphy as Neville, Chris O'Dowd as Dennis, Max Minghella as Martin Sharp, Sienna Miller as Neville's girlfriend Louise Ferrier and Emma Booth as Germaine Greer (who vehemently repudiated the movie in her Guardian column). As of 25 May 2016, the movie was noted in the Internet Movie Database as having been "abandoned". Neville died in 2016.

Richard Walsh became the founding editor of Gareth Powell's POL magazine, editor of the weekly newspaper Nation Review, and chief executive of the major Australian publishing and bookselling firm Angus & Robertson. In 1986, he was appointed as director and publisher of Kerry Packer's Australian Consolidated Press organisation, eventually managing a stable of over 70 magazines.

Martin Sharp has long been regarded as Australia's leading pop artist and is well known in Australia for his passionate interest in Sydney's Luna Park and in the life and music of Tiny Tim. He died in 2013.

Oz was parodied in the short-lived 1999 UK television series Hippies.

== Digital collections ==
In 2014 the University of Wollongong Library, in collaboration with Richard Neville, made available on open access a complete set of digital copies of Oz Sydney magazine and Oz London magazine.

== See also ==
- Artistic freedom
- Censorship
- Counterculture
- Freedom of information
- Freedom of the press
- Freedom of speech
- List of underground newspapers of the 1960s counterculture
- Nonconformity
- Political repression
- Subculture
- UK underground
