= Michael Argyle (judge) =

English judge

His Honour Michael Victor Argyle, MC, QC (31 August 1915 – 4 January 1999) was a British judge at the Central Criminal Court of the United Kingdom from 1970 to 1988. Earlier, as a barrister, he defended Ronnie Biggs and, as a judge, presided at the Oz obscenity trial.

== Early life ==
Michael Argyle was born in Tamworth, Staffordshire in England. He received his formal education at Shardlow Hall prep school, Westminster School, and obtained a degree in the Law at Trinity College, Cambridge. He began practising as a Barrister in 1938. During World War II he served as a commissioned officer with the 7th Queen's Own Hussars, in India and the Italian theatres, being awarded the Military Cross for his leadership in an opposed crossing of the River Po in 1945. He was discharged from the British Army in 1947. He was an active member of the Conservative Party, and seeking access to Parliament he stood unsuccessfully for the Party in Belper in the 1950 general election, and again in the Loughborough constituency in the 1955 General Election.

== Legal career ==
Having been called to the Bar in 1938, he became a Queen's Counsel at the age of 36. As a barrister he gained press interest for his defence of Ronnie Biggs in his trial for the Great Train Robbery.

After graduating from practising law into the ranks of the judiciary in 1962, Argyle found himself at odds judicially with elements of the counter-cultural zeitgeist that increasingly dominated English society as the 1960s progressed, reciprocating in kind the animosity he attracted from its proponents in the public sphere with statements and decisions made from his bench which refused to yield to the pervading air of Socialistic relativism and permissiveness, and as a judge representing a judicial authoritarianism from the earlier half of the 20th century.

As a judge, he is best remembered for his role during the Oz obscenity trial, in which the three Oz editors (Richard Neville, Jim Anderson and Felix Dennis) were tried on three charges, including "conspiracy to corrupt public morals", an offence which, in theory, carried a virtually unlimited penalty. The three defendants were found guilty, with Argyle sentencing Neville and Anderson to serve a term of imprisonment with hard labour, but the convictions were subsequently overturned on appeal, when it was found that Argyle had misdirected the trial jury on several occasions. At the time of Argyle's sentencing in the Oz trial, he had given Dennis a reduced punishment on the basis of his "lower intelligence".

In 1995, Dennis, by now a millionaire publisher, won a libel action against The Spectator. In an article published on 20 May 1995, Argyle had claimed Dennis and his Oz co-defendants had imported and peddled drugs to school children, and also implied that they were behind threats against his life which had obliged him to stay in a hotel during the trial, guarded by armed Special Branch police. The Spectator donated £10,000 to two charities nominated by Dennis, in lieu of damages. However he declined to sue Argyle personally, commenting: "Oh, I don't want to make him a martyr of the Right: there's no glory to be had in suing an 80-year-old man and taking his house away from him. It was just a totally obvious libel."

He retired from the Bench in 1987, after receiving a public reprimand from the Lord Chancellor for public statements that foreign immigration into the United Kingdom was out of control, and that Capital Punishment should be reintroduced into England's judicial system for certain crimes.

== Death ==
Argyle died at 84 on 4 January 1999 at Fiskerton, Nottinghamshire.

== Personal life ==
Argyle married Ann Newton in 1951, the marriage producing three daughters.

Coat of arms of Michael Argyle

Motto
Rapto Vivens
