= Jim Anderson (editor) =

British-Australian editor and novelist

- Born: 1937 (age 88–89)
- Education: University of Sydney
- Occupations: Editor and novelist
- Known for: Editing OZ Magazine

Jim Anderson (born 1937) is a British-Australian editor and novelist. He edited OZ Magazine and later wrote the novels Billarooby (1988) and Chipman's African Adventure (2015).

== Early life and education ==
Anderson was born in Haverhill, Suffolk, but his family emigrated to Australia when he was one year old. This was due to his father having a dispute with his own father, with whom he never reconciled. They moved to Orange, New South Wales, and then to Warwick, a small town (now place name) near Cowra on the Lachlan River, where his family had a vegetable farm. The farm became unworkable in the 1940s, due to the river drying up in a prolonged drought, and at this time he helped his father trapping rabbits for food. In Sydney, he studied law at the University of Sydney, while also working at the Attorney General's Department.

== Career ==
Anderson joined OZ in 1969. In 1971, he was prosecuted in London, along with fellow OZ editors Felix Dennis and Richard Neville for OZ number 28, "the Schoolkids Issue". Hutchinson's novel Billarooby was published in 1988. Told from the view of a 12-year-old boy, it explored themes of relationships of the boy with his father and a male teacher who falls in love with his father. The family drama reaches its climax in association with the infamous Cowra BreakOut and Massacre of Japanese POWS. Anderson also edited Neville's 1995 memoir Hippie, Hippie Shake. With the assistance of NSW Film * Television Office, Anderson wrote a screenplay for Billarooby as a feature movie, entitled From A Death to a View.

Anderson declared his homosexuality to his mother after the trial, but never told his father. After the demise of OZ in 1973, Anderson had a mental breakdown and travelled to Ghana and then California to find treatment and relief. After primal scream therapy, he spent some time in Druid Heights, a healing centre on Mt Tamalpais, Marin County, and then moved to Bolinas, a small alternative town north of San Francisco, where he lived for 18 years. In 1975–76, he attended peyote meetings with Magda Cregg in Bolinas, which were held at the time of the full moon in the tradition of the Huichol, a Mexican Indian tribe. Anderson found these meetings very calming and that they healed his mental state: he attended 12 meetings. In Bolinas, Anderson became the Monday editor of the Bolinas Hearsay News, wrote a weekly column on town affairs and created front-page headings in the form of collages for this publication every week. Anderson had attended East Sydney Technical College many years earlier while living in Sydney, but was unable to relate to anything taught. As an artist he is entirely self-taught.

Anderson returned to Sydney in the mid-1990s and has since pursued a career as writer and photo-artist. In 2011, he mounted a major retrospective exhibition titled Lampoon: An Historical Art Trajectory, at the Tin Sheds Gallery, University of Sydney, February 18 – March 12, 2011. Later that same year (2011), Lampoon was exhibited at South Hill Gallery, Goulburn.

Anderson's second novel, Chipman's African Adventure, was published in March 2015. Jim Anderson spoke as a panelist at the 2016 Bellingen Readers and Writers Festival on "Truth and Authenticity in Fiction" and "The Creative Process: How Hard is it to Write?" In June 2016, Billarooby, Anderson's first novel was re-published by Valentine Press.

== Bibliography ==
- Billarooby. Fireside, 1988. ISBN 0-671-68039-0. Valentine Press, 2016.
- Chipman's African Adventure. Valentine Press. 2015. ISBN 978-0-9942244-0-8.
