= Roger Benjamin =

Australian academic

Roger Benjamin FAHA
- Born: 18 June 1957 (age 69)
- Occupation: Art historian
- Awards: Discovery Outstanding Researcher Award, Australian Research Council, 2003

Academic background
- Education: BA (Hons) University of Melbourne, 1979; MA Bryn Mawr College, 1981; PhD Bryn Mawr College, 1985

Roger Harold Benjamin FAHA (born 18 June 1957) is professor of Art History at the University of Sydney.

Benjamin is an Australian art historian and curator who was born and raised in Canberra, where he attended the Canberra Grammar School. Moving to Melbourne, he trained in Fine Arts and Philosophy at the University of Melbourne (1975–79) before travelling to the United States for his MA (1981) and PhD (1985) at Bryn Mawr College, undertaking research in Paris. His first book and articles in French, British, and American journals focused on Matisse and the art of the Fauves (Matisse’s "Notes of a Painter": Criticism, Theory and Context, 1891-1908 Ann Arbor, 1987).

Benjamin moved back to Australia with his appointment as lecturer in Fine Arts at the University of Melbourne, where he taught for 14 years (1984–98). In 1995, he co-curated the travelling retrospective Matisse for the Queensland Art Gallery and, in 1997, curated Orientalism: Delacroix to Klee at the Art Gallery of New South Wales. His long-standing interest in Orientalist art culminated in Orientalist Aesthetics: Art, Colonialism and French North Africa, 1880-1930 (Berkeley 2003), which received the prestigious Robert Motherwell Book Award in 2004. Benjamin's exhibition Renoir and Algeria was organised by the Sterling and Francine Clark Art Institute before travelling to Dallas and Paris, where it was reincarnated as De Delacroix à Renoir: L'Algérie des peintres (2003).

Benjamin moved from Melbourne to Canberra as a research fellow at the Centre for Cross-Cultural Research at ANU (1998–2001). His work on contemporary Australian art includes the exhibition Juan Davila (Sydney & Melbourne, 2006) and numerous writings on Tim Johnson. He has taught on Aboriginal art since 1992, and in 2009 curated Icons of the Desert: Early Aboriginal Painting from Papunya (Ithaca, New York) ISBN 9781934260074.

From 2003 to 2007, he was J. W. Power Professor and Director of the Power Institute at the University of Sydney, succeeding Virginia Spate. Academics whose postgraduate work Benjamin has supervised include Ian McLean, Mary Roberts, Chris McAuliffe, Charles Green, Caroline Jordan, Luke Gartlan, Natalie Adamson, and Stephen Gilchrist. Benjamin held the Australian Research Council’s DORA professorial fellowship from 2013 to 2016, resulting in his book Kandinsky and Klee in Tunisia, University of California Press, 2015. His exhibition Biskra, sortilèges d'une oasis [Biskra, visions of an Oasis] was held at the Institut du Monde Arabe, Paris, in 2016 before travelling to the Musée Matisse in Nice in 2017.

Benjamin was elected Fellow of the Australian Academy of the Humanities in 2006.

== Selected publications ==
- ———— (1987). Matisse's 'Notes of a Painter': Criticism, Theory and Context, 1891-1908. Studies in the Fine Arts: Criticism. Vol. 21. Ann Arbor: UMI Research Press. ISBN 9780835717434. LCCN 86025056. OCLC 1305193591. OL 2730980M.
- ————, ed. (1997). Orientalism: Delacroix to Klee. Sydney: Art Gallery of New South Wales. ISBN 9780731313440. OCLC 1101208454. OL 26827747M.
- ———— (2003-02-03). Orientalist Aesthetics: Art, Colonialism, and French North Africa, 1880-1930. Berkeley: University of California Press. ISBN 9780520222175. LCCN 2002022627. OCLC 470481558. OL 7710829M.
- ————, ed. (2003-02-08). Renoir and Algeria. New Haven: Yale University Press. ISBN 9780300097856. OCLC 449944715. OL 9505328M.
- ————; Bett, Guy, eds. (2006). Juan Davila. Miegunyah Volumes. Vol. 79. Sydney: Museum of Contemporary Art Australia. ISBN 9780522852448. OCLC 950216423. OL 16279293M.
- ————; Ashjian, Cristina (2015). Kandinsky and Klee in Tunisia. Oakland: University of California Press. ISBN 9780520283657. LCCN 2014046646. OCLC 898029306. OL 27201138M.
- ———— (2016). Biskra, sortilèges d'une Oasis [Biskra, spells of an oasis] (in French). Paris: Institut du Monde Arabe. ISBN 9782843061851. OCLC 982080007.
