= Goldspink (surname) =

Goldspink is a surname. Notable people with the surname include:

- Brett Goldspink (born 1971), Australian rugby league player
- Darren Goldspink (born 1964), Australian rules football umpire
- Kevin Goldspink (born 1941), Australian rugby league player
- Sebastian Goldspink, curator of the 2022 Adelaide Biennial at the Art Gallery of South Australia
