= Dai Paterson =

Australian actor (born 1977)

- Born: David Paterson; 24 April 1977 (age 49); Tasmania, Australia
- Education: National Institute of Dramatic Art
- Occupations: Actor; Musician; Composer
- Years active: 1999–2014
- Father: Ric Paterson

David Paterson, also credited as Dai Paterson (born 24 April 1977) is an Australian actor, musician and composer, who has appeared in such television series as Beastmaster and Dog's Head Bay. He is theatrically trained, and has acted in such stage productions as Troy's House, The Proposal, The Resistible Rise of Arturo Ui, Henry VI, Part I, and Waiting for Godot.

== Early life and education ==
Paterson is the son of ABC radio presenter Ric Paterson. Paterson was born in Tasmania, Australia. His parents were both involved with local theatre in Tasmania. Dai gained an interest in the craft at school where undertook performance classes. His formal education took him to the National Institute of Dramatic Art (NIDA) in Sydney, Australia but he failed to complete the course.

== Career ==
Paterson's screen debut started with Australian band Silverchair in their music video for their song "Emotion Sickness" in 1999. Between small roles, theatre and failed television series Dog's Head Bay, he landed the role of King Voden on the Canadian television series Beastmaster. His character appeared in nine episodes throughout the second season.

When his character did not return, Paterson moved on to the television film drama The Turner Affair co-starring actress Rachel Blakely. He went back to small guest appearances on various television series including Blue Heelers and Stingers before finding acclaim on the stage.

In 2003 Paterson starred opposite Maria Mercedes in Anna Kannava's art house film Dreams for Life. Paterson played the role of Martin. The film had an Australian release and received film industry nominations and awards, and was seen in film festivals in Australia, France, North America, Cyprus, and Italy.

In 2004, Paterson portrayed Danny in the play Happy New, a play about two brothers who had been traumatized in childhood and in the eye of a media storm. Happy New got reviewed. Paterson is working with the theatrical company So Much Art... So Few Bullets.

He starred in the unreleased Australian film Right Here, Right Now made in 2003 directed by Matthew Newton. The film screened at Canada's Rebelfest independent film festival where it won the award for best feature film.

Paterson composed the score for the film Lake Mungo.

== Personal life ==
Paterson moved to London in 2007 and resides in the seaside town of Brighton, East Sussex. He performs with his band Rhodesia in London.

== Filmography ==
David Paterson film and television credits
| Year | Title | Role | Notes | Ref. |
|---|---|---|---|---|
| 1999 | Dog's Head Bay | Todd | 10 episodes | |
| 2000–2001 | Beastmaster | King Voden | Recurring role | |
| 2002 | The Turner Affair | David Turner | Television film | |
| 2003 | Blue Heelers | Rory De Souza | 1 episode | |
| 2004 | Stingers | Ross Breslin | 1 episode | |
| 2004 | Dreams for Life | Martin | Theatrical film | |
| 2004 | Right Here, Right Now | Dan | Theatrical film | |
