= Hal and Jim McElroy =

Australian twin film and television producers (born 1946)

- Born: 6 April 1946 (age 80); Melbourne, Victoria, Australia
- Occupations: Film and television producers

Hal McElroy and James McElroy (born 6 April 1946) are Australian film and television producers. They are twin brothers.

They are best known for three films they produced jointly in the 1970s, all directed by Peter Weir at the start of his career: The Cars That Ate Paris (1974), Picnic at Hanging Rock (1975), and The Last Wave (1977). They were also joint associate producers of Let the Balloon Go (1976).

The McElroy brothers also worked on projects separately before, during and after these joint projects. They have had entirely separate careers since 1982, with the exception of Till There Was You (1991). Hal now works with his wife Di McElroy.

== Early and family life ==
Hal and Jim McElroy were born in 1946 in Melbourne. As twins, they were always inseparable and had identical interests, school activities and friends. They entered the film industry together in 1966, moving to Sydney to work on productions such as Age of Consent (1969) and Ned Kelly (1970). They were inspired to become producers themselves, and set up a production company.

Hal met his wife Di, a producer of live television shows, while both were working on the Australian Ballet's 1973 film of Don Quixote in Melbourne. She was secretary to the Administrator of the Australian Ballet, Dame Peggy van Praagh, and personal assistant to Sir Robert Helpmann and Rudolf Nureyev. Hal was production manager for the film company. They married in 1975, and had their honeymoon at the Cannes Film Festival, where Picnic at Hanging Rock was being exhibited. They have three children.

Hal and Jim had always lived together, and this continued even after Hal married Di. In 1977, a light and sound spectacular called Laserdome, in which the three McElroys had invested heavily, failed within three days and they lost their house and all their other assets. In 1994 Hal and Jim parted company, as they felt a need to establish their own separate identities, in both their professional and personal lives.

In November 1996, Hal McElroy was involved in a serious traffic collision which threatened to leave him blind, brain-damaged and paraplegic. He recovered, but now has seven screws and a plastic plate in his head.

Hal and Di McElroy became business partners, with a company called McElroy Television, later McElroy Allmedia. Their first co-production was Dog's Head Bay (1999), written by David and Kristin Williamson.

== Jim McElroy ==
Jim's first credit was as production manager on the television series Spyforce (1971).

His later solo projects have all been in film. They include:

- The Year of Living Dangerously (1982; producer; this was also directed by Peter Weir; Linda Hunt won an Academy Award for Best Supporting Actress)
- A Dangerous Summer (1982; writer and producer)
- Traps (1994; producer)
- Mr. Reliable (1996; producer)
- Dear Claudia (1999; producer).

== Hal McElroy ==
Hal McElroy's solo projects include:

Film

- Alvin Purple (1973; production manager and first assistant director)
- Between Wars (1974; production manager and associate producer)
- The Man from Hong Kong (1975; assistant director)
- Caddie (1976; assistant director)
- Blue Fin (1978; producer)
- Razorback (1984; producer)
- A Dangerous Life (1988; originally a six-hour TV miniseries, producer)
- The Sum of Us (1994, executive producer)

Television

- Return to Eden (1982 series, executive producer)
- A Dangerous Life (1988 TV miniseries, producer)
- A*mazing (series; 1994–98)
- Blue Heelers (series; executive producer of 54 episodes 1994–95)
- Water Rats (series, executive producer of 62 episodes 1996–98)
- Time Masters (series; 1996–98)
- Murder Call (series, executive producer of 55 episodes 1997–2000)
- Going Home (series, 2000–2001, 130 episodes, executive producer with Di McElroy)
- Balmain Boys (2003 movie, executive producer)
- Sea Patrol (series, executive producer of 41 episodes 2007–11).

== External sources ==
- Hal McElroy at IMDb
- Jim McElroy at IMDb
