= Kick (TV series) =

- Genre: Comedy / Family Drama
- Directed by: Esben Storm
- Starring: Zoe Ventoura; Firass Dirani; Raji James; George Kapiniaris; Maria Mercedes; Anh Do; Kat Stewart
- Country of origin: Australia
- Original language: English
- No. of seasons: 1
- No. of episodes: 13

Production
- Executive producer: Debbie Lee
- Producers: Esben Storm; Adam Bowen
- Running time: 25 minutes

Original release
- Network: SBS
- Release: 9 June – 18 August 2007

Kick was an Australian television series that was first broadcast on 9 June 2007 on SBS TV.

It was set in Brunswick in Melbourne, Australia. The series follows the adventures of wild twenty-something Miki Mavros (Zoe Ventoura), who is forced to move back in with her Greek-Australian parents on Hope Street after a failed attempt to "make it big". Miki begins work as a secretary for suave Anglo-Indian Dr. Joe Mangeshkar, who has a girlfriend named Jan, and things spiral out of control. Miki manages a local neighbourhood soccer team, hence the series title Kick.

The show also follows the adventures of Miki's neighbours on Hope Street, including the Salim family, a Lebanese-Australian Muslim family with siblings Amen, Osama "Ozzie", Taghred and Layla. Amen (Firass Dirani), is an aspiring businessman with questionable ethics. Osama is going through typical teenage angst and has a crush on Taghred's friend Tatiana. Taghred is an aspiring soccer star. Layla is a university student arranged to be married to Sharif, but everything changes when Layla falls for fellow fencer Jackie.

The first season of the show is available on DVD.

== Season one ==
Episode #	Title	Original airdate
1	"Kick Start"	9 June 2007
• Unemployed Miki Mavros returns home to live with her parents, Takis and Dora, on Hope Street after trying to break into the entertainment industry and kick start her career. • University student Layla meets Jackie in a fencing match - there's attraction at first sight and they exchange numbers. But we learn that Layla is reluctantly engaged to be married to Sharif.
2	"You Can't Stop The Music"	16 June 2007
• Jackie invites Layla to a party and Layla happily accepts. Later, Layla is forced to cancel for the karaoke party where she is performing with her brother and sister. Jackie comes to the karaoke party unannounced and after Layla finishes performing, she flees without talking to Jackie.
3	"I Feel A Tingle"	23 June 2007
• Miki's day turns into a nightmare when her commercial audition is a disaster, she forgets to help out her boss and Tatiana's soccer dreams continue to nag her. • Tatiana's soccer is put on hold when she lands a gig in a band. • After a tiff about Layla's seeming disinterest in continuing their relationship, Layla and Jackie resolve their misunderstanding and go out for coffee. Layla meets Jackie's friends who catch her off guard by asking if she is Jackie's girlfriend. Layla says they are just hanging out, but the question clearly makes her think.
4	"Attitude"	30 June 2007
• Layla continues to enjoy her time spent with Jackie at university, while her relationship with fiancée Sharif continues with him being more invested than she is.
5	"Get It While You Can"	7 July 2007
• The attraction between Layla and Jackie grows although their attempts to be alone together are repeatedly thwarted. Finally, Layla and Jackie kiss for the first time.
6	"Love The One You're With"	14 July 2007
• Layla invites Jackie to meet her family but worries that their relationship will be exposed. Jackie assures Layla she will keep their secret. After meeting Sharif, Jackie asks Layla if he is her boyfriend; she answers he is just her "disguise".
7	"And The Singer Is..."	21 July 2007
• Layla and Jackie room together during an overnight fencing camp. Their plans are interrupted when another fencer named Jody joins them temporarily, but they eventually have the opportunity for private intimacy after Jody decides to go home early. *Note*: Former "Saddle Club" star Janelle Corlass-Brown guest stars as Jody.
8	"Playing With Fire"	28 July 2007
• Layla meets Sharif's female cousin, and Sharif talks about plans to have children after Layla graduates; Layla is less than enthusiastic about the idea. Attending a lesbian club with Jackie, Layla is surprised to see Sharif's cousin with a female companion.
9	"Baby, Believe Me"	4 August 2007
• Layla shops for white goods with Jackie, and for engagement rings with Sharif.
10 & 11	"While The Cat's Away" & "Get Up, Stand Up"	11 August 2007
• Jackie accidentally learns from Sharif that he is engaged to marry Layla. Layla says she is torn between her feelings for Jackie and her obligation to her family to marry Sharif; she does not want to marry Sharif but is not ready to reveal that she is gay. Amen sees Layla and Jackie kiss at a party but says he will not tell anyone about their relationship. Jackie turns up uninvited at Layla and Sharif's engagement party, but leaves early in tears.
12 & 13	"Crunch Time" & "Issi, Ozzie, Oi Oi Oi!"	18 August 2007
• Jackie tells Layla their relationship is over if she stays with Sharif and continues to hide her relationship with Jackie. Amen also tells Layla that she needs to make a decision. To her mother's dismay, Layla tells Sharif that she does not love him and cannot marry him. She explains this to Jackie, but says she is not ready to reveal to her family that she is gay. Jackie and Layla resume their relationship.

== Cast ==
- Zoe Ventoura as Miki Mavros
- Raji James as Joe Mangeshkar
- George Kapiniaris as Takis Mavros
- Maria Mercedes as Dora Mavros
- Anh Do as Hoa Tran
- Damien Fotiou as Nico Angelidis
- Firass Dirani as Amen Salim
- Nicole Chamoun as Layla Salim
- Stephen Lopez as Osama 'Ozzie' Salim
- Craig Menaud as Ravi Mangeshkar
- Mauricio Merino Jr as Justin Haz
- Romi Trower as Jackie Schneider
- Kat Stewart as Jan Pollock
- Alex Menglet as Zoran Baranoff
- Nadja Kostich as Martina Baranoff
- Natasha Cunningham as Tatiana Baranoff
- Osamah Sami as Sharif Doumani
- Rebecca Asha as Guest Cast
- Deidre Rubenstein as Reva Feinmann
- Tony Nikolakopoulos as Hakim
- Costas Kilias as George
- Steve Mouzakis as Terry Abruzzi

== See also ==
- List of Australian television series
- List of television shows with LGBT characters
