= Elizabeth Ann Macgregor =

Scottish-born curator and art historian

Elizabeth Ann Macgregor OBE AM FRSN
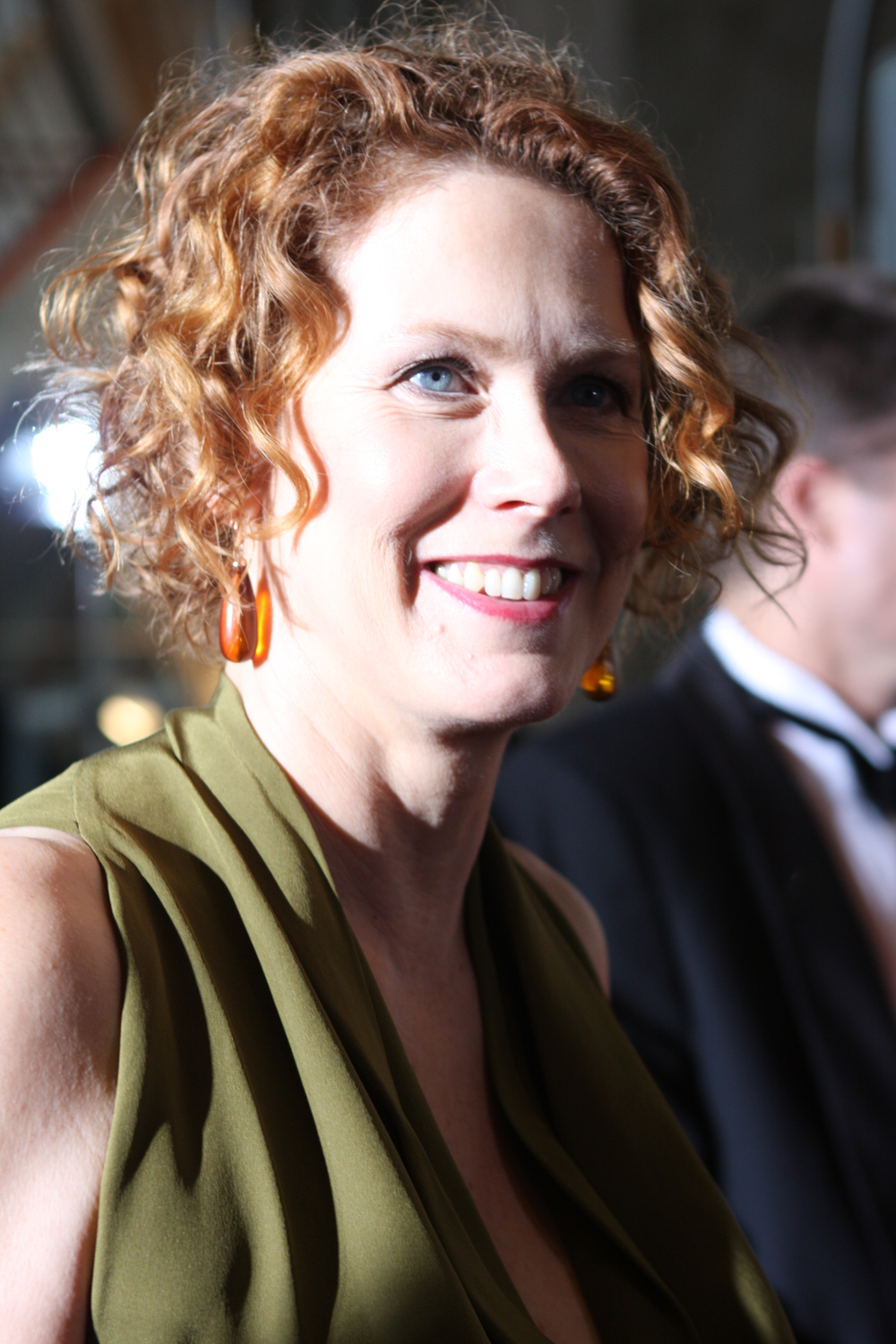
- Elizabeth Ann Macgregor in January 2012
- Born: Dundee, Scotland
- Other name: Liz Ann Macgregor
- Education: University of Edinburgh
- Occupations: Gallery director, art historian
- Employers: Scottish Arts Council; Arts Council of Great Britain; Museum of Contemporary Art Australia

Elizabeth Ann Macgregor is a curator and art historian who was director of the Museum of Contemporary Art (MCA) in Sydney, Australia from 1999 until October 2021.

== Early life and education ==
Born in Dundee, Scotland, to a Church of Scotland priest who later became a bishop of the Scottish Episcopal Church and his wife, Macgregor's family moved to Stromness in the Orkney Islands for most of her childhood, which she shared with many foster children her parents took in; they adopted her younger sister. As part of her education there she studied five languages and music. She played in the Youth String Orchestra of Scotland and planned on a career in music until a maths teacher told her that would be "a shocking waste of a good brain." She attended the University of Edinburgh and graduated with a Masters in the History of Arts. She subsequently completed a diploma in Museum and Gallery Studies in Manchester, England.

== Career ==
On completing her studies, Macgregor's first job was with the Scottish Arts Council, for whom she was curator and driver of their mobile art gallery, an experience she says taught her that people are not alienated from contemporary art by the art itself as much as they might be by the way it is presented. She then worked for the Arts Council of Great Britain for three years, before spending ten years as director of the Ikon Gallery in Birmingham, where she made it a priority to reach out to the area's non-white population.

She was appointed director of the Museum of Contemporary Art Australia (MCA) in 1999 and moved to Sydney. When she took over the museum was struggling financially, a decade after its creation, and bankruptcy threatened. Macgregor eliminated the regular admission fee, which increased visitation sixfold over the next decade as well as donations and revenues from the gift shop. The pressure this put on the museum's physical plant was eased by an addition to the former government office building on Circular Quay that housed it which nearly doubled its space and allowed visitation to reach over a million by 2018.

From 2016 to 2019 Macgregor served as President of the Board of the International Committee for Museums and Collections of Modern Art for a three-year term. She has established a strong working relationship with the Tate in London, resulting in the joint acquisition of works by 15 Australian artists.

In March 2021 she announced that she would resign from the MCA, which she had helped weather the early days of the COVID-19 pandemic, effective October 2021, to return to Scotland and spend more time with her family.

== Writings ==
Macgregor contributed a chapter titled "Investment in Culture: Folly or Necessity? in the 2006 publication, Talking About Sydney: Population, community and culture in contemporary Sydney, edited by Robert Freestone, Bill Randolph and Caroline Butler-Bowdon. She contributes the forewords for books on artists and exhibitions produced by the MCA. She also contributed an essay, "A Tale of Two Cultures", to Essentially Creative, edition 23 of the Griffith Review.

In 2026 her memoir The Power of the Real was published by Sydney University Press.

== Awards and honours ==
- 2001: Centenary Medal for "service to Australian society and contemporary art"
- 2011 Queen's Birthday Honours: appointed an Officer of the Order of the British Empire in the Diplomatic Service and Overseas List for "service to contemporary art"
- 2016: named NSW Creative Laureate for 2016 jointly with Carriageworks multi-arts centre. When speaking of this award she said: "Creativity is the key to innovation, and innovation drives growth, sustainability and prosperity, enriching NSW's – and Australia's – cultural capital"
- 2016: elected President of the Board of the International Committee for Museums and Collections of Modern Art for a three-year term
- 2019: Fellow of the Royal Society of New South Wales (FRSN)
- 2019: winner of the Arts, Culture and Sport category of the 2019 Australian Financial Review's "100 Influential Women"
- 2022: appointed Member of the Order of Australia for "significant service to museums and galleries through leadership roles with arts institutions"
- 2022: awarded honorary Doctor of Letters by the University of Sydney for "her immense dedication to the arts and the Museum of Contemporary Art"
