= Dreams for Life =

- Directed by: Anna Kannava
- Written by: Anna Kannava
- Produced by: Aanya Whitehead
- Starring: María Mercedes; Dai Paterson
- Cinematography: Firooz Malekzadeh
- Edited by: Jill Holt
- Release date: 2004
- Running time: 75 minutes
- Country: Australia
- Language: English

Dreams for Life is a 2004 Australian film written and directed by Anna Kannava.

== Cast ==
- María Mercedes as Ellen
- Dai Paterson as Martin

== Reception ==
Adrian Martin of the Age gave it 3 1/2 stars saying "Dreams for Life richly extends and fulfils the promise of Kannava's previous work. Cheekily taking its title from a self-help book, Dreams for Life is not afraid to confront the ersatz wisdom of the New Age movement in order to dig deep into the emotional truth of slogans about loving yourself, or coming to the peace with the past." Evan Williams of the Weekend Australian gave it 3 stars. He writes "It's a delicate, deceptively slight and oddly touching reflection on love and solitude and way the past can shape our lives." RealTime's Keith Gallasch said he "found its dialogue awkward, the plotting loaded and Ellen’s opacity too limiting." Margaret Pomeranz, on At the Movies, gave it 3 1/2 stars and said "The film which has been delicately directed with an old-fashioned formalism is a meditation on loneliness, lost love and lost cultures."
