= Craig Menaud =

Craig Meneaud is an Australian television actor and drama teacher.

Menaud is best known for the role of Dave in the medical drama series All Saints; as well as appearances in the series Kick and Sea Patrol.

In 2010, he appeared in the play Momento Mori at the Sydney Fringe Festival. He has also acted in Woomera, a 2002 play which tells the story of Justin, a young prison guard recently arrived at the Woomera Immigration Reception and Processing Centre.

Apart from his acting career, Menaud is also involved in music and teaching acting and drama for tertiary students at Granville College.
