= Sebastian Goldspink =

Sydney based curator

Sebastian Goldspink is a Sydney-based independent curator whose work has played a key role in shaping Australia's contemporary art scene. Goldspink is known for his advocacy of emerging and First Nations artists.

In 2011, Goldspink founded ALASKA Projects, an artist-run initiative that transformed unused urban spaces into art venues, showcasing over 500 artists across more than 150 exhibitions.

Goldspink has curated exhibitions in Australia and on international stages, including London, Los Angeles, New Orleans, and Christchurch. In 2022, he was the appointed curator of the Adelaide Biennial of Australian Art at the Art Gallery of South Australia. Free/State featured a multi-generational group of 25 Australian artists and explored themes of autonomy, identity, and cultural expression.

In 2021, Goldspink was inaugural Director of the Woollahra Gallery at Redleaf. He served as Director of Hazelhurst Arts Centre in Sydney’s Sutherland Shire, and had been a lecturer at the University of NSW (School of Art & Design). He had also been Creative Producer at the National Art School, mentoring the next generation of artists and curators.

Goldspink has also held other positions at Australian institutions including the Museum of Contemporary Art, Art Month Sydney, National Art School, and Dlux Media Arts. He has also collaborated with the Museum of Old and New Art (MoNA), Performance Space, Sydney Symphony, Art Bank, and Kaldor Public Art Projects.

Goldspink is regularly invited to judge art prizes nationally. Examples include: MA Art Prize CIAF Cairns Indigenous Art Fair The Churchie Emerging Art Prize, Institute of Modern Art (IMA) Tim Olsen Drawing Prize Award, UNSW Art & Design and Emerging 2025.

Goldspink is also a writer and speaker. He has contributed to several publications including Art Link, Art Collector, Art Monthly, Russh, and Artist Profile and been engaged to speak at Guildhouse, South Australia. He is noted for his curatorial philosophy, which focuses on diversity, accessibility, and art's ability to foster dialogue and transformation.

== Acting career ==
Graduating in 1995 from The Ensemble Theatre, Sydney, where he studied acting, marked the start of Goldspink's creative career. He has appeared in numerous television shows including Murder Call, Dogs Head Bay and Wildside however is best for playing the role of Charlie Byrd in Heartbreak High in seasons four and five of the series.

== Personal life ==
Goldspink is a descendant of the Burramattagal people of Western Sydney. He holds a Bachelor of Arts in Literary Theory from Macquarie University, Sydney, Australia.
