= Dog's Head Bay =

- Genre: comedy
- Written by: David Williamson; Kristin Williamson
- Directed by: Simon Phillips
- Starring: Gary Sweet; Susan Lyons; Shane Withington
- Composer: Mark Rivett
- Country of origin: Australia
- Original language: English
- No. of series: 1
- No. of episodes: 13

Production
- Executive producers: Hal McElroy; Geoff Portmann
- Producer: Peter Askew
- Camera setup: Andrew Oliver
- Running time: 25 mins

Original release
- Network: ABC
- Release: 16 August – 8 November 1999

Dog's Head Bay is a 1999 Australian television series co-written by David Williamson on the ABC. It was about a criminal lawyer, Alex Santorini, who buys a house in the sleepy coastal town of Dog's Head Bay. One of the stars was Shane Withington, who later called the show "the worst piece of television in the history of Australia".

== Cast ==
- Gary Sweet as Alex Santorini
- Susan Lyons as Vicki Santorini
- Sebastian Goldspink as Nicholas Santorini
- Shane Withington as Bob Grant
- Sarah Peirse as Jenny Grant
- Rachael Coopes as Amanda
- Vic Rooney as Bert
- Dai Paterson as Todd
- Jeff Truman as Mike
- Roy Billing as Franco Poreini
- Felix Williamson
- Celia Ireland as Alice Astassio
- Gerry Connolly as Tony Du Clos
