= Bloom (musical) =

Australian musical

- Music: Katie Weston
- Lyrics: Tom Gleisner
- Book: Tom Gleisner
- Premiere: 18 July 2023: Arts Centre Melbourne Playhouse, Melbourne
- Productions: 2023 Melbourne; 2025 Sydney
- Awards: Green Room Award for New Australian Music Theatre Writing

Bloom is an Australian musical with book and lyrics by Tom Gleisner, music by Katie Weston and directed by Dean Bryant. Set in an aged care facility, the musical comedy is a story of intergenerational connection and the power of music.

It was originally produced by the Melbourne Theatre Company at the Arts Centre Melbourne Playhouse, from 18 July to 26 August 2023. The cast included Anne Edmonds, Frankie J. Holden, Evelyn Krape, Vidya Makan, Maria Mercedes, Eddie Muliaumaseali’i, John O’May, Christina O’Neill, Jackie Rees and Slone Sudiro.

A Sydney season at the Roslyn Packer Theatre for the Sydney Theatre Company ran from 29 March to 11 May 2025. The Sydney production featured new actors Christie Whelan Browne and John Waters, with all other Melbourne cast members returning.

The musical was generally well received. It received a 2024 Green Room Award for New Australian Music Theatre Writing.

== Principal casts ==
Role	Melbourne	Sydney
Role	2023	2025
Mrs MacIntyre	Anne Edmonds	Christie Whelan Browne
Doug	Frankie J. Holden	John Waters
Rose	Evelyn Krape	Evelyn Krape
Ruby	Vidya Makan	Vidya Makan
Betty/Chef	Maria Mercedes	Maria Mercedes
Sal/Inspector/News Reporter/Trev	Eddie Muliaumaseali'i	Eddie Muliaumaseali'i
Roland	John O'May	John O'May
Gloria	Christina O'Neill	Christina O'Neill
Lesley	Jackie Rees	Jackie Rees
Finn	Slone Sudiro	Slone Sudiro

== Musical numbers ==
- "Nowhere Else to Go" – Finn and Rose
- "Chasing the Clock" – Ruby, Gloria, and residents
- "I Just Need a Break" – Finn
- "Maybe It's Time" – Rose and Ruby
- "Sunny Days" – Betty, Doug, Lesley, and Rose
- "The Best Is Yet to Be" – Ruby
- "Everything I Do" – Mrs MacIntyre, Staff, and residents
- "People Like You" – Ruby and Finn
- "The Story of My Life" – Residents
- "Here At Pine Grove" – Mrs MacIntyre, Staff, and residents
- "Salvatore's Song" – residents and staff
- "Choir Rehearsal" – residents and staff
- "All This Wasted Time" – Finn, Doug, Ruby, and Lesley
- "Being There With You" – Gloria, Ruby, Finn, and residents
- "Grow a Little Older" – residents and staff
