= Virginia Spate =

Australian art historian (1937–2022)

- Born: c. 1937; United Kingdom
- Died: 12 August 2022 (aged 84–85); Sydney, Australia
- Education: University of Melbourne (BA); University of Cambridge (MA; Bryn Mawr College (PhD)
- Occupation: Historian
- Employer(s): Power Institute of Fine Arts of University of Sydney; Australian Academy of the Humanities

Virginia Margaret Spate AC FAHA (née Obione; 1937 – 12 August 2022) was a British-born Australian art historian and academic.

Spate was born in the United Kingdom in 1937. She lived in Burma as a child until her family was evacuated during the Pacific War. In 1951, she settled in Australia, where she studied a Bachelor of Arts degree in history and fine arts at the University of Melbourne, graduating in 1961. She studied and lectured in art history at the University of Cambridge, receiving a Master of Arts. She then received a PhD from Bryn Mawr College in Pennsylvania, United States.

In 1978, Spate was appointed J. W. Power Professor and Director of the Power Institute of Fine Arts at the University of Sydney. She retired in 2004, and became a professor emeritus of the institute. She was elected fellow of the Australian Academy of the Humanities in 1981 and appointed Slade Professor of Fine Art at the University of Cambridge in 1998–99.

Spate was made a Companion of the Order of Australia (AC)—Australia's highest civilian honour—on 11 June 2018, for eminent service to higher education, particularly to art history and theory and to the advanced study of the contemporary arts, as an academic, author and curator, and as a role model for young art historians.

She died on 12 August 2022.

== Works ==
- Olsen, John; Spate, Virginia, 1937– (1963), John Olsen, Georgian House
- Roberts, Tom; Spate, Virginia, 1937– (1972), Tom Roberts, Lansdowne, ISBN 978-0-7018-0390-2
- Spate, Virginia (1979), Orphism : the evolution of non-figurative painting in Paris, 1910-1914, Clarendon Press; New York : Oxford University Press, ISBN 978-0-19-817197-3
- Spate, Virginia; Monet, Claude, 1840-1926 (1992), The colour of time : Claude Monet, Thames and Hudson, ISBN 978-0-500-09229-3
- Spate, Virginia; Degas, Edgar, 1834-1917 (2000), Degas : life and works, Cassell, ISBN 978-0-304-35569-3
