= Kevin Goldspink =

Australian rugby league footballer

Personal information
- Full name: Kevin Brian Goldspink
- Born: 16 November 1941 Tumbarumba, New South Wales
- Died: 5 October 2024 (aged 82)

Playing information
- Position: Lock, Second-row
Club
Years	Team	Pld	T	G	FG	P
1963–69	Canterbury-Bankstown	106	6	0	0	18
1970–71	Eastern Suburbs	25	3	0	0	9
	Total	131	9	0	0	27
Representative
Years	Team	Pld	T	G	FG	P
1972	NSW Country	1	0	0	0	0
- Source: As of 25 October 2019
- Relatives: Brett Goldspink (son)

Kevin Brian Goldspink (born November 16, 1941- October 6, 2024) was an Australian rugby league footballer who played in the 1960s and 1970s for Canterbury-Bankstown and Eastern Suburbs.

== Playing career ==
Goldspink played for Canterbury-Bankstown at second-row forward in the 1967 NSWRFL season's premiership final loss against South Sydney. He played with Canterbury-Bankstown for six seasons between 1963 and 1969. He was selected for the Kangaroo Tour in 1968 and played 13 matches on tour, but no tests.

He finished his career at Eastern Suburbs, playing two seasons between 1971 and 1972.

His son, Brett Goldspink, played rugby league for the Perth Reds, Canberra, Illawarra, Oldham, St Helens, Halifax and Wigan.
