= Kristin Williamson =

Australian journalist and author (born 1940)

Kristin Löfvén Williamson (born 1940) is an Australian journalist and author.

== Life ==
Williamson was born in Melbourne, went to school in Geelong and trained as a teacher. On graduating she took up a scholarship at the University of Florence in Italy to study Italian. She taught drama in Victoria and moved to Sydney in 1979 where she worked for The National Times.

With her second husband David Williamson, she co-wrote the film Touch the Sun: Princess Kate, she also researched his films The Last Bastion and Gallipoli. She co-produced and wrote for the television series Dog's Head Bay.

She is the sister of Australian filmmaker Chris Löfvén. She and her husband David have five adult children.

== Bibliography ==
- The Last Bastion. (Sydney: Landsdowne, 1984) ISBN 0-7018-1847-6
- Brothers to Us, 1998
