= Museum of Contemporary Art Australia =

Art museum in Sydney, Australia

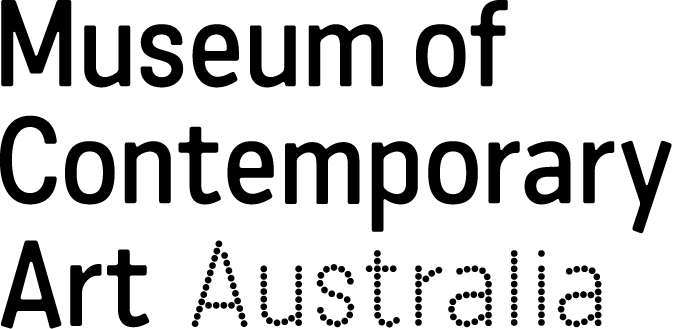

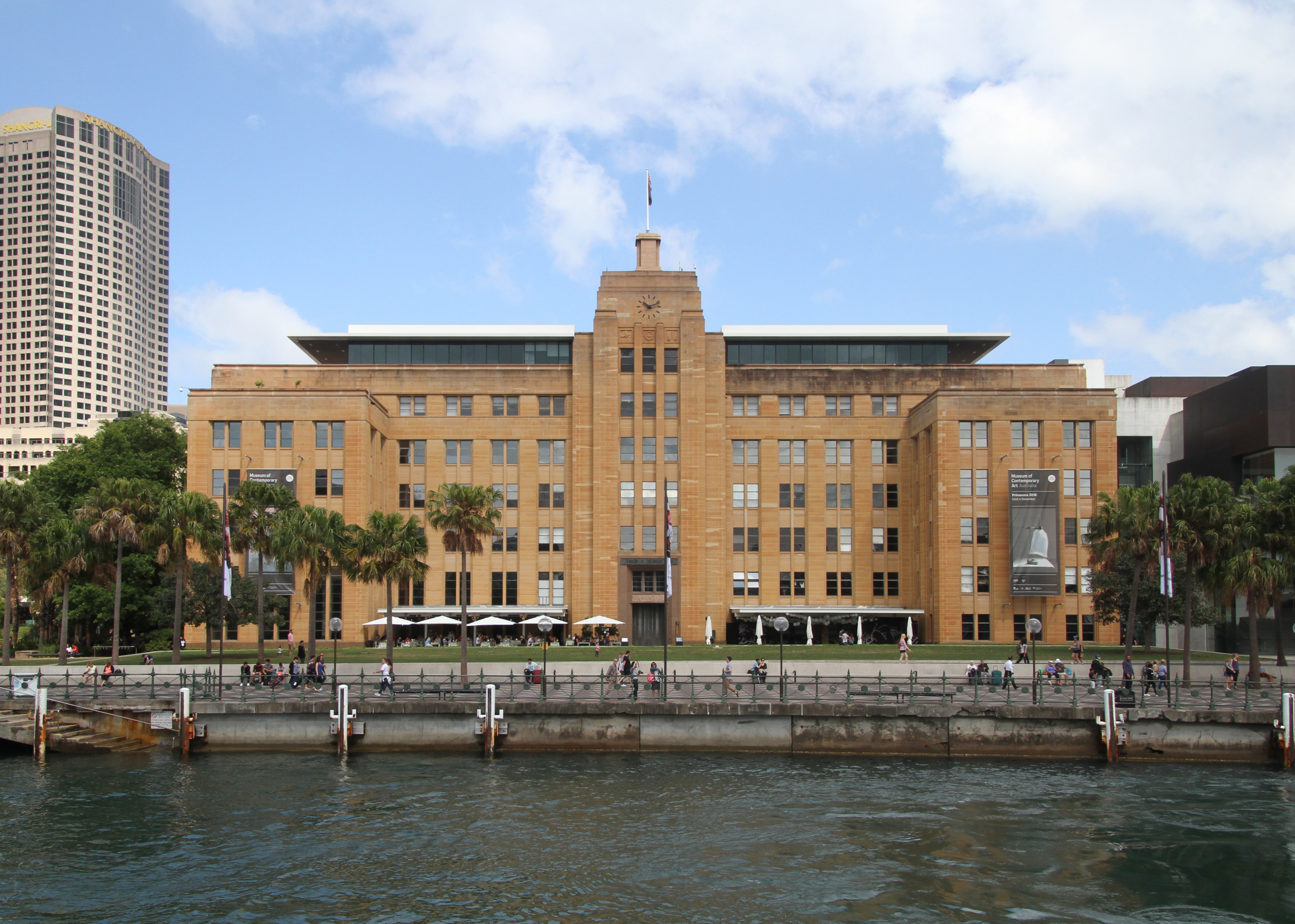
- Museum from the east, with the newer Mordant Wing at right

- Location in The Rocks
- Interactive fullscreen map
- Established: 1991; 35 years ago
- Location: George Street, Sydney, Australia
- Coordinates: 33°51′36″S 151°12′32″E
- Type: Contemporary art
- Collections: Raminging, Maningrida, Arnott's, Smorgon
- Collection size: 4,500
- Visitors: 859,386 (2023)
- Founders: John Power; University of Sydney
- Director: Suzanne Cotter
- Chairperson: Lorraine Tarabay
- Curator: Lara Strongman
- Architects: William Henry Withers, Andrew Andersons, Sam Marshall
- Public transit access: : Circular Quay
- Website: mca.com.au

The Museum of Contemporary Art Australia (MCA), formerly the Museum of Contemporary Art, Sydney, is located on George Street in The Rocks neighbourhood of Sydney. The museum is housed in the Stripped Classical/Art Deco-styled former Maritime Services Board (MSB) building on the western side of Circular Quay. A modern wing was added in 2012.

While the museum as an institution was established in 1991, its roots go back a half-century earlier. Expatriate Australian artist JW Power provided for a museum of contemporary art to be established in Sydney in his 1943 will, bequeathing both money and works from his collection to the University of Sydney, his alma mater. The works, along with others acquired with the money, were exhibited mainly as a travelling collection in the decades afterward, stored in two different university buildings. This collection was known as the Power Gallery of Contemporary Art.

When the MSB building became available the Museum of Contemporary Art, Sydney was established in 1991. It rapidly outgrew its space and ran into financial difficulties that were alleviated in the early 21st century under new director Elizabeth Ann Macgregor, who eliminated regular admission fees and diversified the museum's funding sources. After two proposed expansions failed, a design by local architect Sam Marshall met with sufficient approval to raise money for its construction. From 2010 the building underwent a major expansion and re-development, reopening in 2012 as the Museum of Contemporary Art Australia.

Power's original intent was for the museum to exhibit contemporary art from all over the world, with work by Australian artists shown only if it was relevant to the other works, but its focus has since changed primarily to Australian contemporary art. The museum's collection contains over 4,000 works by Australian artists acquired since 1989. They span all art forms with strong holdings in painting, photography, sculpture, works on paper, and moving images, as well as significant representation of works by Aboriginal and Torres Strait Islander artists. The museum runs programs to engage the interest of youth and disabled communities in appreciating and making art.

== Building ==
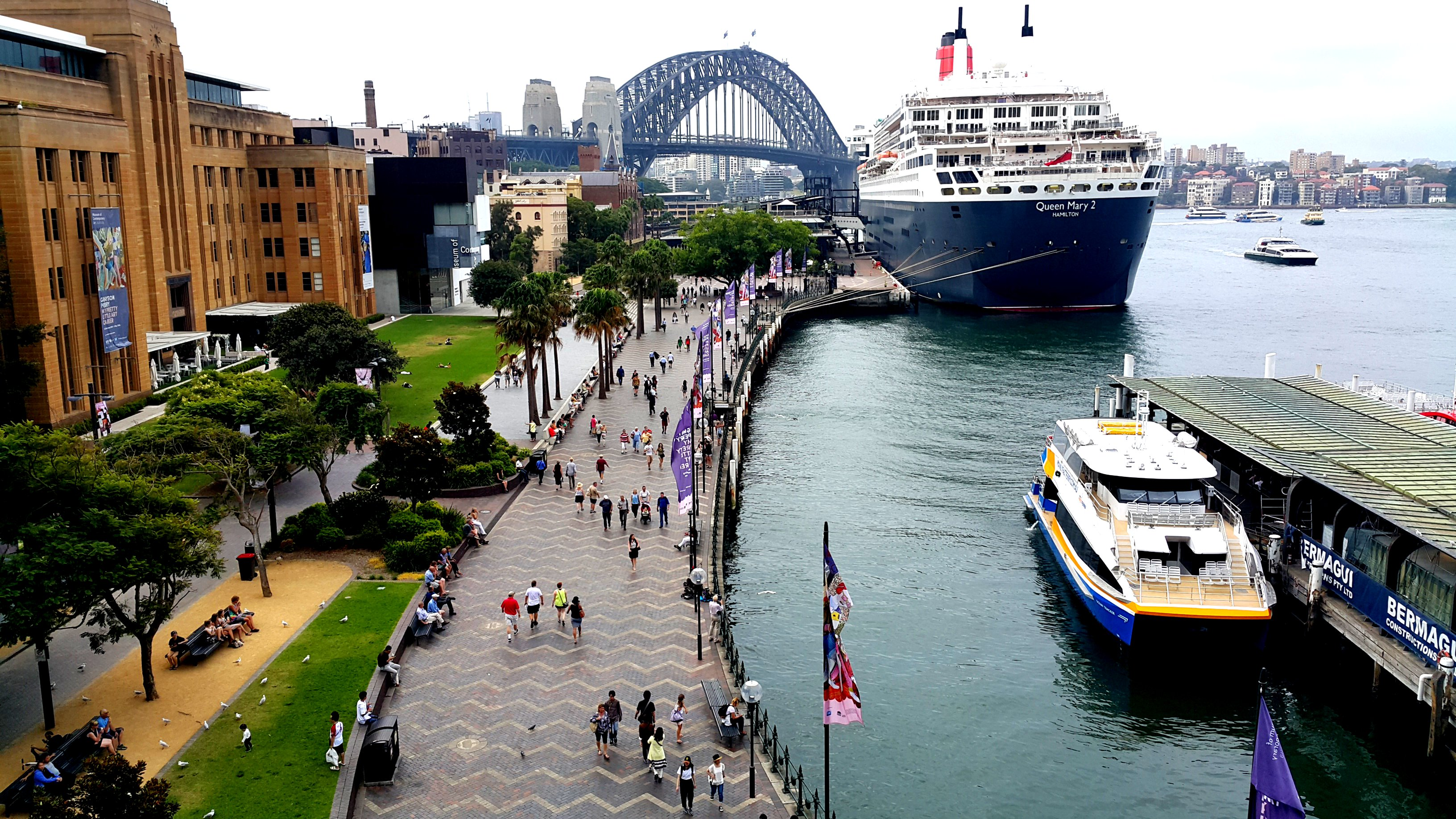
The museum and the Quay

=== Location ===
The museum building has two wings: the main section housed in the former Maritime Services Board (MSB) building, and the newer Mordant Wing on the museum's northern end. It is located on the waterfront in Sydney's The Rocks neighbourhood. George Street is to the west, and First Fleet Park to the south, Circular Quay on the north and east (pedestrians only on that side, abutting the water). Immediately beyond it, the Cahill Expressway separates the park and The Rocks from Sydney's central business district (CBD). Two of the city's landmarks are nearby—the Sydney Opera House is visible a short distance across the harbour and the Cahill turns onto the Sydney Harbour Bridge to the north. Just beyond the expressway to the south are some of Sydney's skyscrapers such as 1 Macquarie Place and the Salesforce Tower

A broad lawn separates the museum from the quay to its east. To the west and northwest, the Rocks is urban and densely developed up to the bridge's southern approach, with attached two- and three-storey mixed-use buildings from the 19th and early 20th centuries. Nearby, cruise ships moor at the quay, and ferries serving the Sydney area arrive and depart from slips.

=== Exterior ===
The architectural style of the building is Stripped Classical/Art Deco.

==== Former Maritime Services Board building ====
The former MSB building is a six-storey, 17-bay light orange-brown stone structure in the Stripped Classicism style with Art Deco ornamentation. A slightly projecting central clock tower is complemented by three-bay pavilions projecting two bays at the ends of both elevations. Atop the roof is a modern penthouse with glass facing and a flat roof with wide eaves. Two modern roofs, supported by circular metallic pillars, shelter the concrete deck in front of the ground-floor windows between the entrance and the pavilions. The one on the south side has tables and chairs serving the museum's restaurant. On the west (rear) elevation, the space between the pavilions is filled in with a block of modern shop spaces in an irregularly alternating black and white pattern on the upper storeys similar to that on the museum's newer Mordant Wing.

On the exterior, the foundation level is one course of rusticated polished pink Rob Roy granite which also forms the surround of the main entrance on the east elevation and the auxiliary entrance on the south. The rest of the facade is smooth-dressed orange sandstone, which also forms the surround of the tertiary entrance on the north pavilion of the west facade.

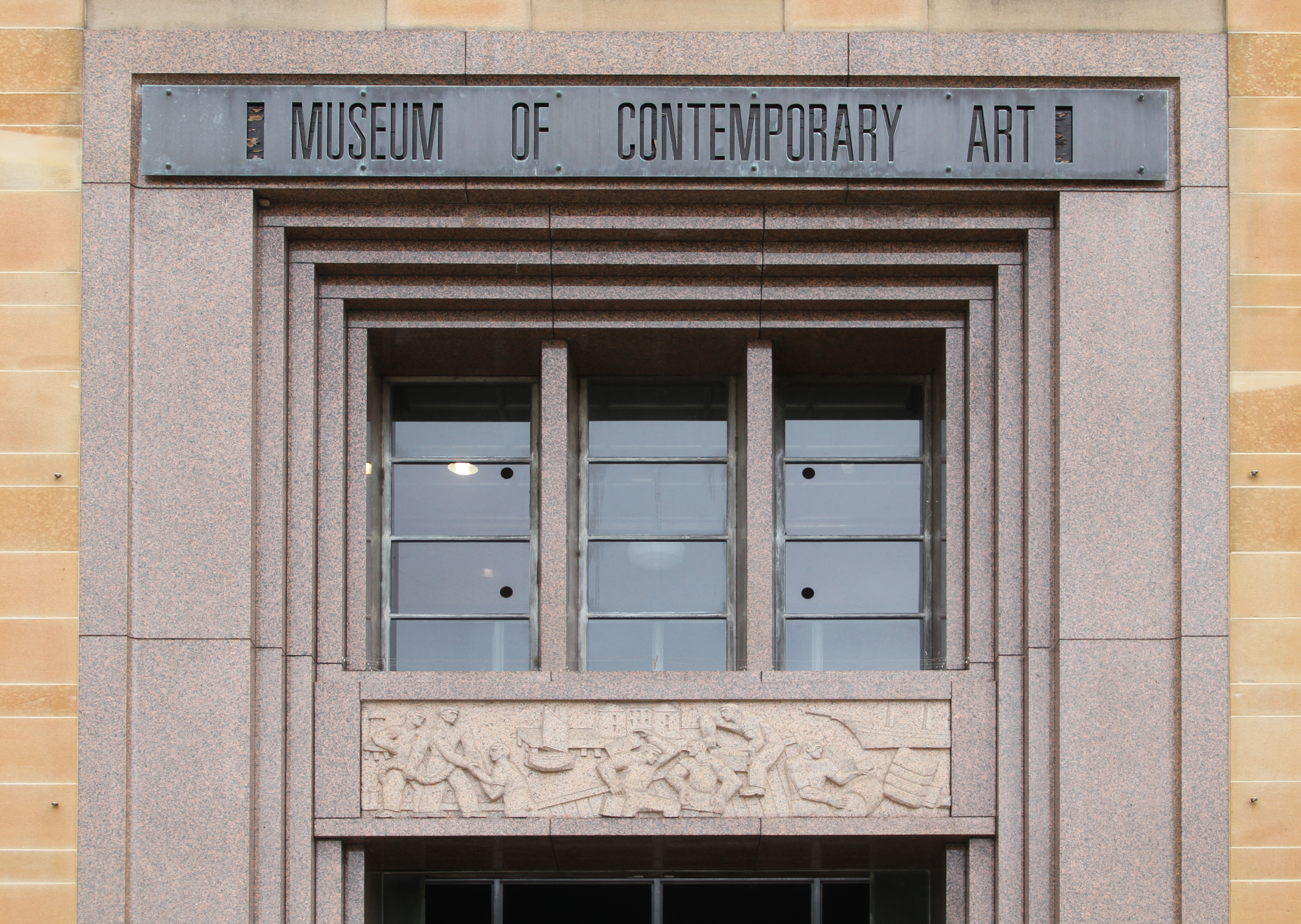
Central entrance transom

Fenestration takes the form of triple-paned double windows separated by a continuous stone muntin in a continuous vertical recessed strip. On the south end of the building, the windows on the first two storeys are also continuous. The recessed strips and muntins end in a broad plain frieze above the fifth storey separating similar but shorter windows on the sixth storey of the main block.

On the central clock tower, the main entrance is a recessed pair of dark bronze doors topped by a sandstone frieze depicting sailors and dockworkers. Above it is a transom of three small four-paned windows with stone muntins. Atop the entryway is a bronze plaque with "Museum of Contemporary Art".

Above the entrance, the clock tower treatment consists of three more widely separated but otherwise similar windows rising from the third storey to the sixth and topped with a decorative pink granite facade depicting a propeller, wheel, and anchor. A clock set against the sandstone is above. The tower is topped by a narrower stage, a square cupola and three flagpoles.

==== Mordant Wing ====
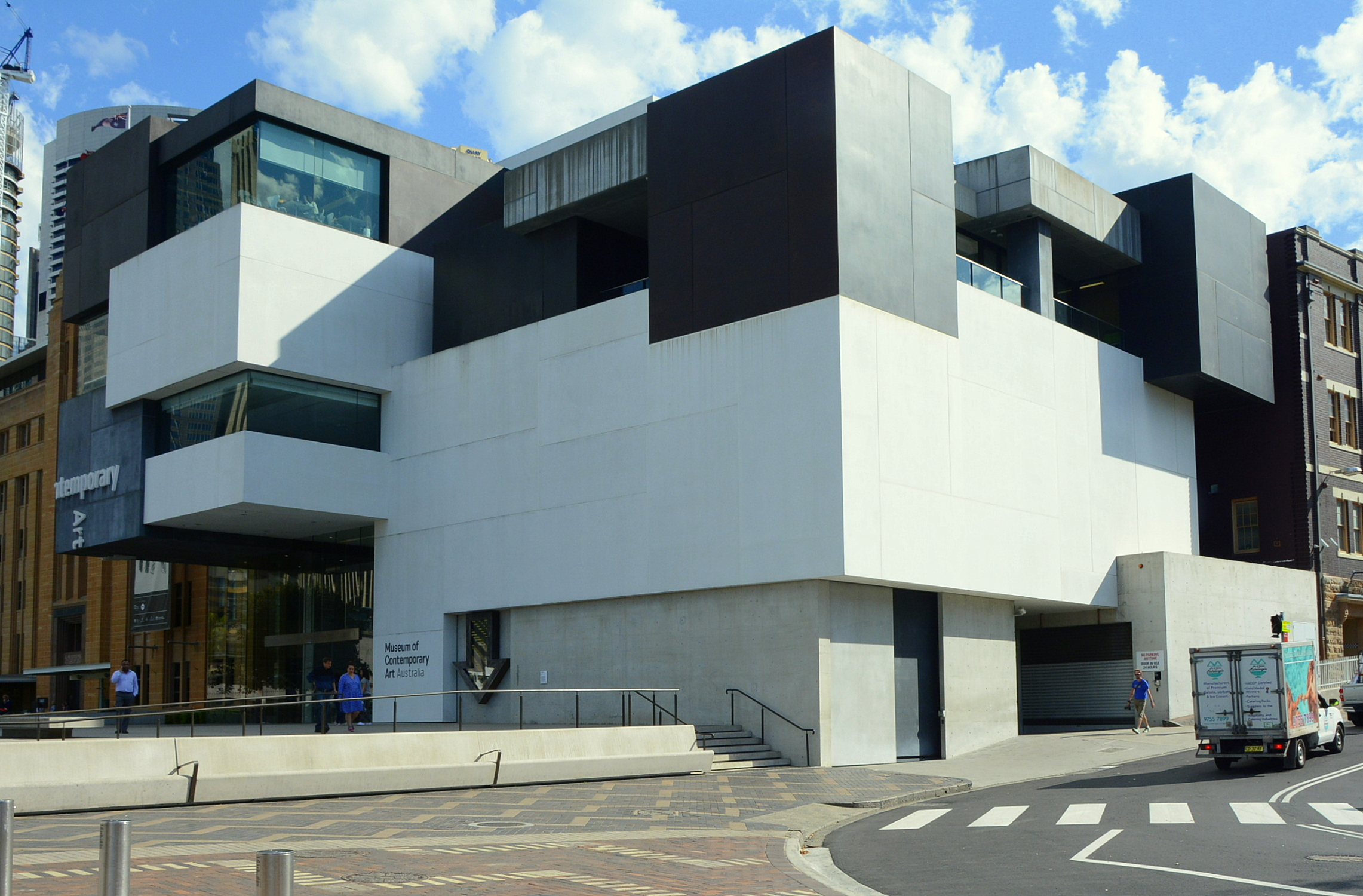
Mordant Wing from northeast

The Mordant Wing on the MSB building's north end is also six storeys high, occupying three-quarters of the remainder of the block not taken up by a local police station building. It is faced in smooth, mostly windowless panels of black, white, and brown stone, made of blocks rectilinear in shape and irregular in size. On the north end is a basement delivery entrance.

The main entrance to the museum is at the southeast corner of the wing, where it abuts the MSB building at a glass-faced stairwell. Sliding glass doors in a glass two-storey entryway open onto a wide stair to the main foyer. Above it is an unsupported projecting three-storey pavilion with strip windows. North of it, a large downward-pointing arrow in the facade at ground level directs visitors to a poem carved in the concrete deck.

On the west, the wing is similarly faced, with an alleyway leading to another service entrance between the wing and the MSB building. At street level is another, smaller entrance, with glass doors, accompanying the museum's gift shop to its south. The facade also overhangs this entrance, but to a lesser extent than its counterpart on the other facade. On the roof is a cafe, partially open, with views of the bridge, opera house, and harbour.

=== Interior ===
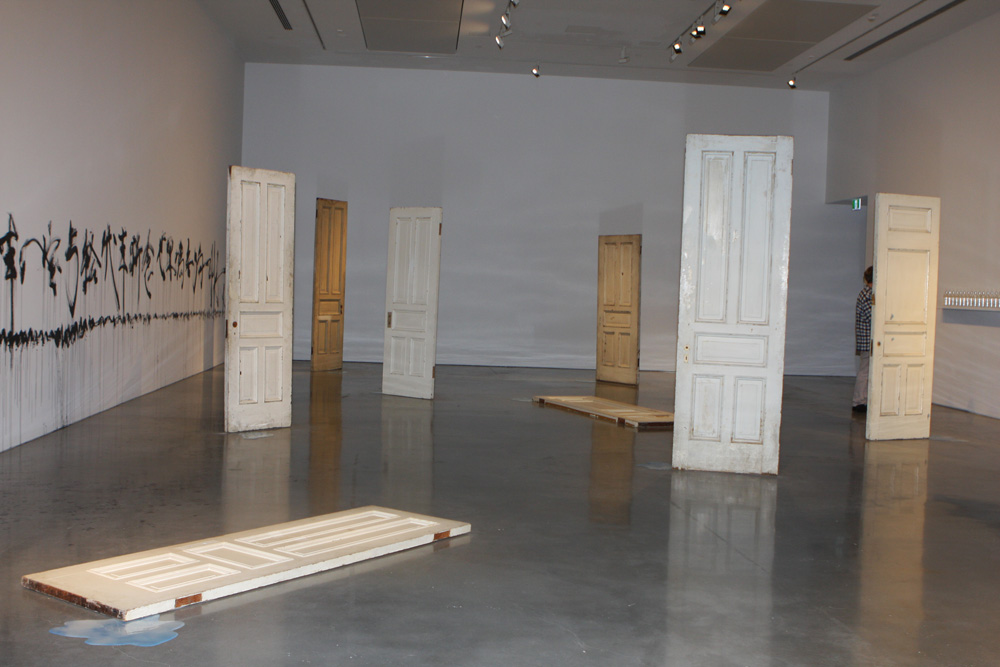
An exhibit hall, shown here with work by Yoko Ono in a 2013 exhibition

When used by the Maritime Services Board the interior made extensive use of scagliola and terrazzo to imitate marble flooring and walls, a common technique at the time. A war memorial and associated artwork were also included. These features remain in what was known as Wharfage Hall, the two-story lobby at the building's central entrance. Today, adapted for use as a museum, much of the interior is now gallery space with plain white walls, concrete floor, and high ceilings. The fourth story's offices have been retained for the museum administration.

== History ==
=== 1798–1942: Prior history of site ===
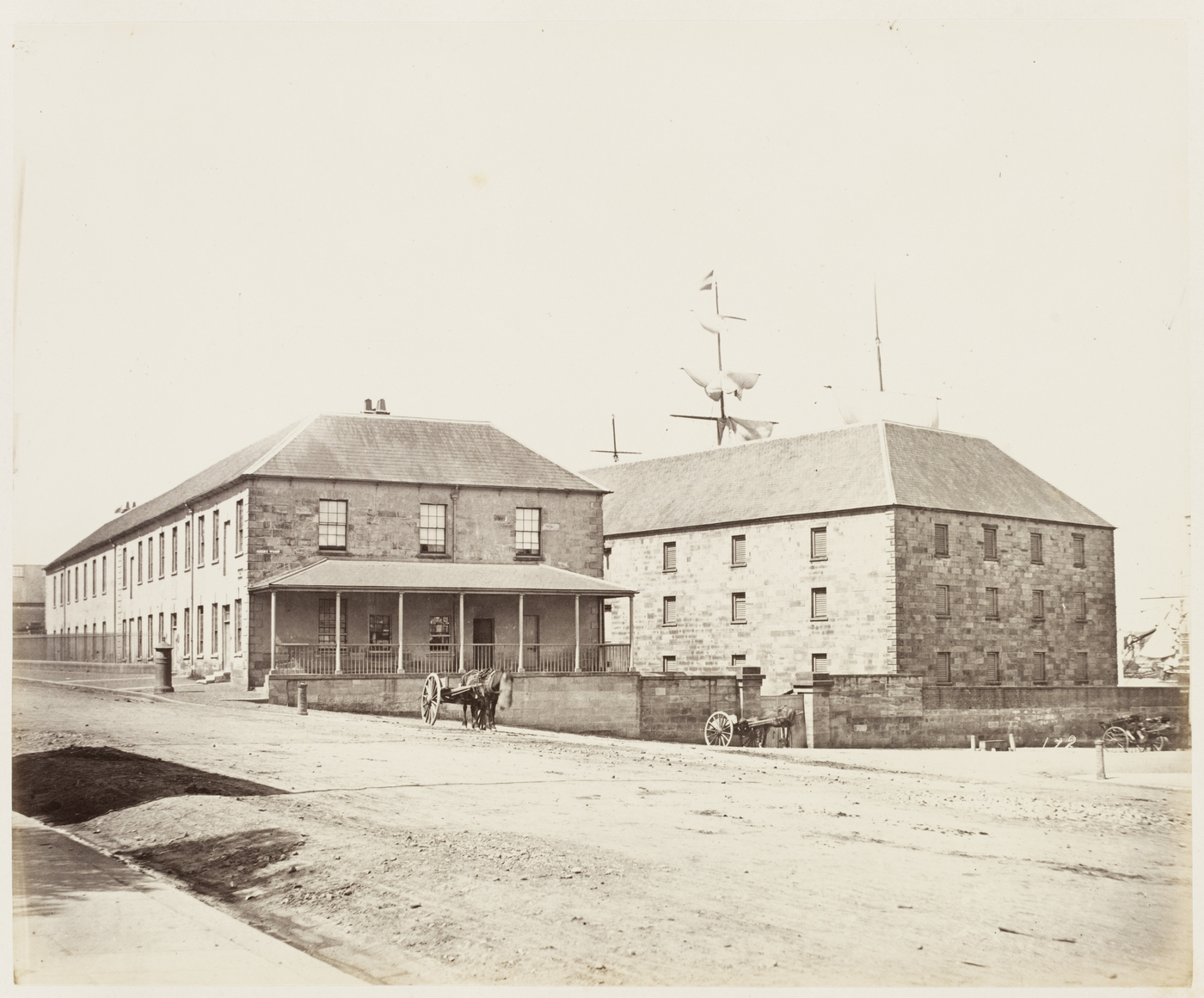
The Commissariat Stores, in 1872, on what is today the museum's site

The Museum of Contemporary Art Australia is located south of the landing spot of the First Fleet. The site originally housed two Commissariat Stores, built using convict labour. The state government assumed control of the Commissariat Stores in 1901 and leased them to commercial tenants. In 1937, the Circular Quay Planning Committee, which had originally recommended the buildings be demolished to provide parkland, changed its mind and called for them to be replaced with a new office for the Maritime Services Board (MSB), which had been displaced by the Circular Quay Railway.

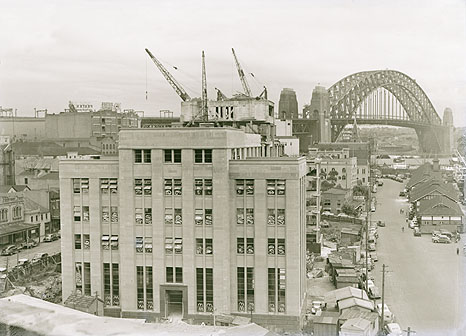
The MSB building under construction

Demolition was completed in 1939. Originally the committee had considered holding a competition for the new building's design, but by then it had decided to use the MSB's own architects. One, William Henry Withers, designed a Stripped Classical building for the agency, with a central tower meant to echo the pylons of the nearby bridge. After site clearance construction was halted in late 1940 since restrictions resulting from the onset of World War II made continued work impossible. The building was resumed in late 1944 with the erection of its steel frame and the offices were opened eight years later by Premier Joseph Cahill. It is listed on both the Register of the National Estate and the New South Wales State Heritage Register.

=== 1943–1991: Power Gallery of Contemporary Art ===
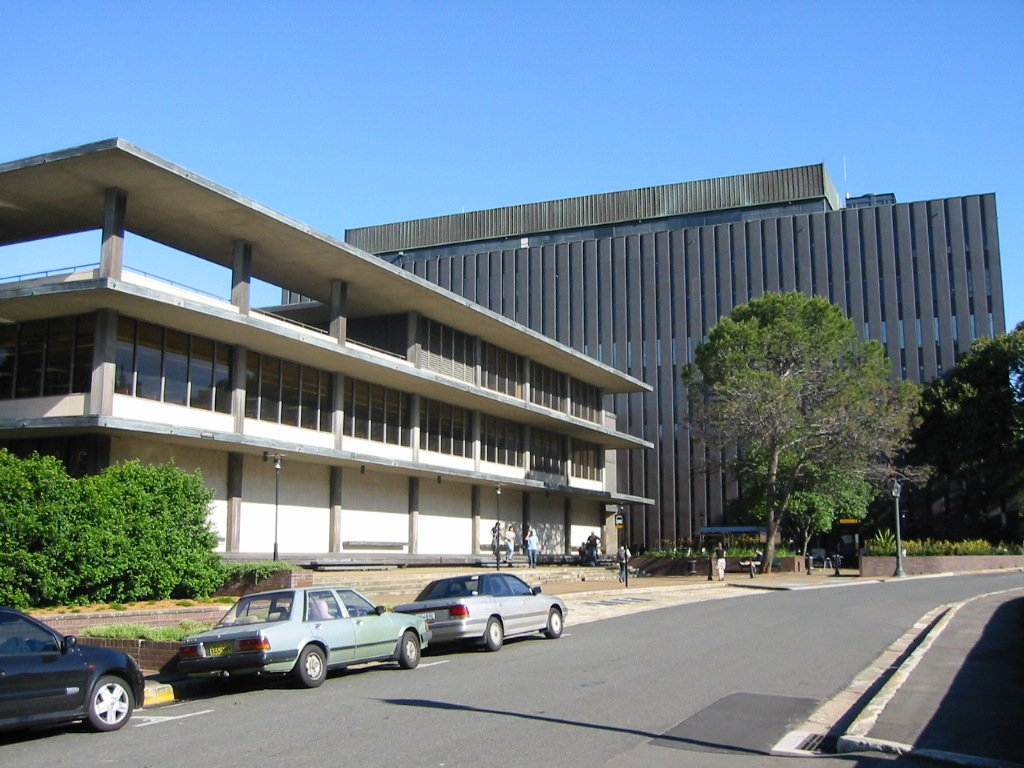
Fisher Library

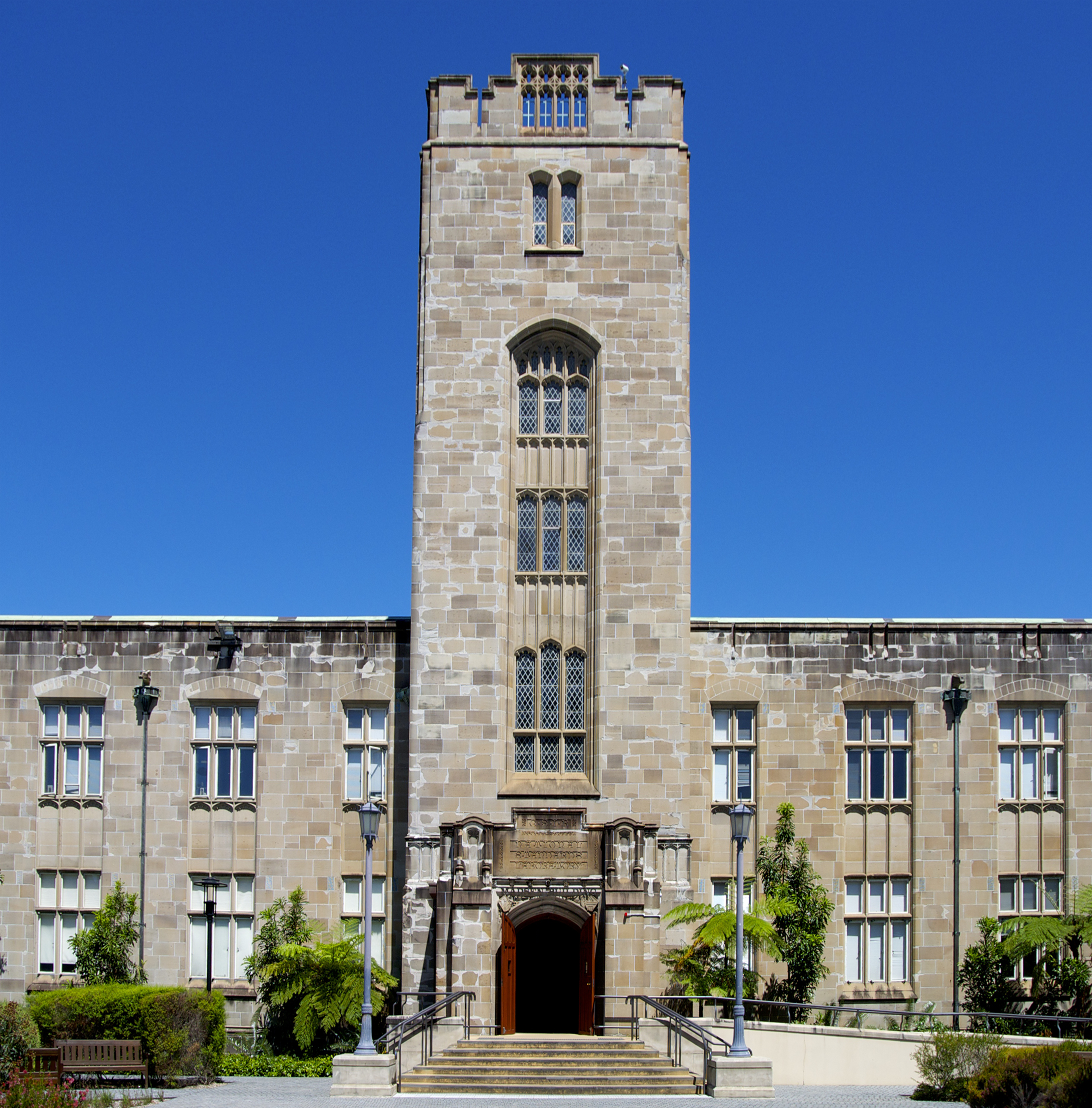
Madsen Building

The MCA's roots are in the 1943 will of Australian expatriate artist JW Power (1881–1943), the first Australian-born painter to experiment with Cubism. Independently wealthy from his previous medical career, he specified that upon his wife's death, his personal fortune, mostly stock worth £A2 million (A$160 million today), was to go to his alma mater, the University of Sydney, with the express purpose of informing and educating Australians in the contemporary visual arts. It was to be used specifically for "museums and other places for the purpose ... of suitably housing the works purchased so as to bring the people of Australia in more direct touch with the latest art developments in other countries."

When Powell's wife died in 1961, the bequest was made public; she also willed most of her husband's works to the university. At the time it was the largest monetary bequest ever made to any Australian university or arts organisation. Four years later the university's senate voted to create the Power Institute of Fine Arts as a beginning of fulfilling Power's wishes.

In December 1970 the University of Sydney also received the Seymour Bequest for the purposes of a performing arts centre, and sought to combine the two bequests into an arts complex that would include within it the Seymour Centre and the Power Institute facilities, including a home for the Power Gallery. It was opened in 1975 as just a performing arts venue.

This collection of artworks took the form of the 'Power Gallery of Contemporary Art', a traveling collection without a permanent address. Between John Power's death and the eventual establishment of the museum, the collection was mainly housed in the University of Sydney's Fisher Library during the 1970s. It was exhibited in the Madsen Building on campus between 1980 and 1989.

=== 1991–1999: Museum of Contemporary Art ===
After the relocation of the Maritime Services Board (MSB) to larger premises in 1989, the building and site were donated by the Government of New South Wales to the Museum of Contemporary Art. Funded by the University of Sydney and the Power Bequest, restoration, and refurbishment of the building commenced in 1990 under the direction of Andrew Anderson of Peddle Thorp/John Holland Interiors, and the following year the Museum of Contemporary Art, Sydney, officially opened.

Those early years in the museum's own space were difficult. The university agreed to help fund the museum's initial costs but did not make any commitment to the long term, as it was expected that the museum would eventually become financially independent. To that end an admission fee was charged; it did not make up for the shortfall as the university began phasing out its support, and the local and national media began expressing concern for the museum's future. Newspaper stories called attention to the paucity of visitors and called the museum "a place for wankers".

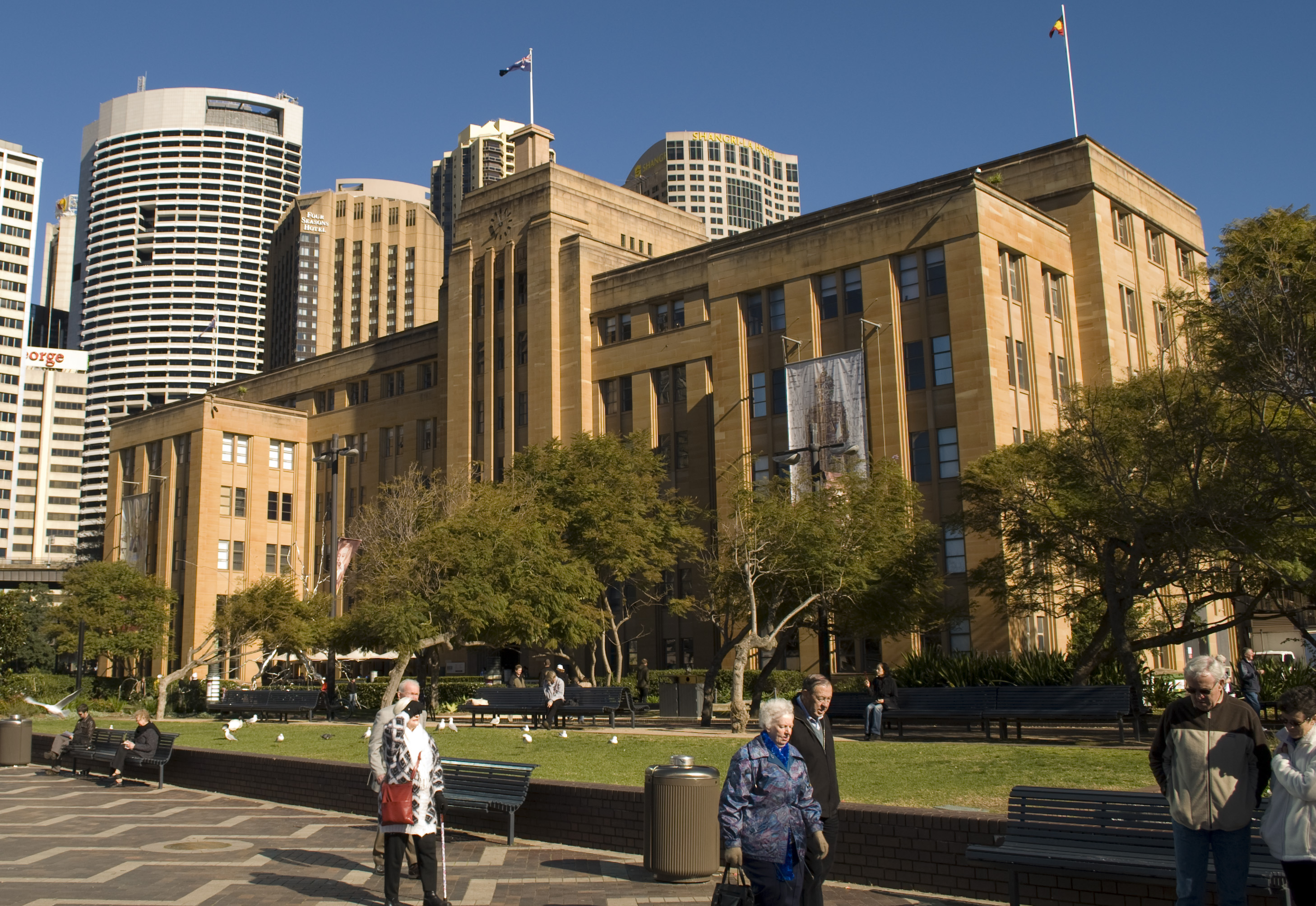
MCA within the former MSB building, seen here prior to 2012 expansion

The building's former offices had been renovated into a more open space with movable walls to accommodate exhibition requirements, with some rooms left intact as archival spaces. The inadequacy of the renovated MSB building as a gallery space, including circulation and accessibility issues, prompted plans for further renovations. In 1997, an international competition was launched for redesigns of the site. The Japanese architectural studio SANAA won, but its plans were abandoned after site investigations revealed the archaeological remains of a colonial dockyard beneath the museum's car park. Another competition was held in 2000; it was won by Sauerbruch Hutton. Their proposal, which called for demolishing the MSB building, met public outcry, and these plans too were abandoned.

=== 1999–2010: Macgregor hiring ===
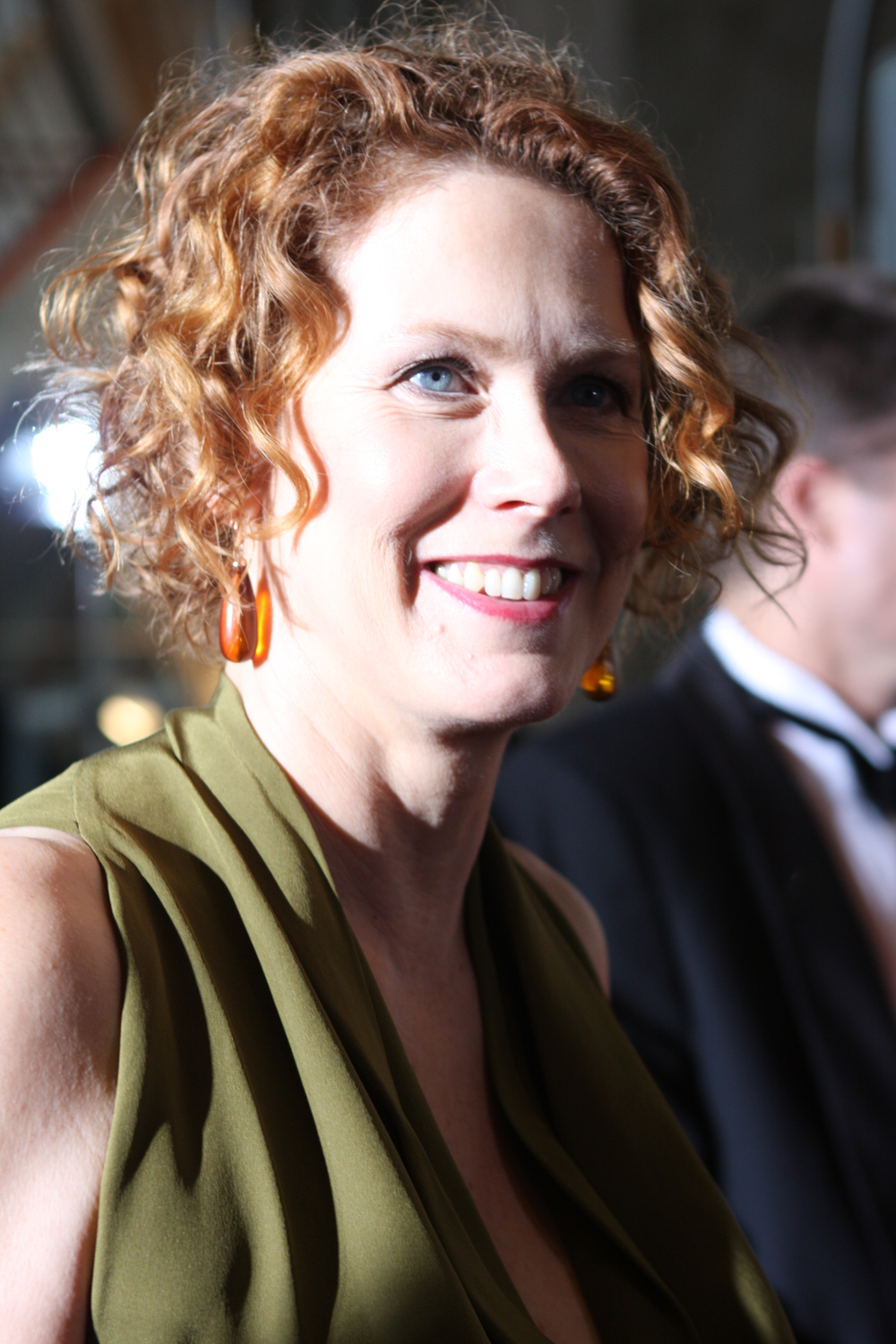
Elizabeth Ann Macgregor, director of the MCA 1999–2021

In 1999, with the MCA facing the prospect of bankruptcy, having just enough money to make payroll for a few weeks, the board hired Elizabeth Ann Macgregor, a Scot who had worked with the Arts Council of Great Britain, as director. She nearly quit within 48 hours of taking the job when the board wanted to hire a co-director so she could focus on the artistic vision behind the museum.

Macgregor had previously held the same post at the Ikon Gallery, a major contemporary art museum also housed in a repurposed heritage-listed building in Birmingham. Shortly after taking over, to encourage more visitation, she eliminated the $12 entrance fee, after securing a half-million-dollar sponsorship from Telstra. Initially, Macgregor worried that no one would come to the museum even if admission was free.

When the museum opened for the 12th Biennale of Sydney in 2000, a festival headlined by Yoko Ono, "we were packed", Macgregor recalled. "As soon as we did that, it completely changed the atmosphere. People came in out of curiosity", she later told The New York Times (A fee is still charged for admission to temporary special exhibitions). Within a year, visitation increased threefold.

Per her belief that contemporary art should be for everyone, especially the many people who believe it is only for the wealthy cultural elite, Macgregor began reaching out to the communities of Greater Western Sydney. After the museum sponsored a free shuttle bus from a Blacktown festival to the museum, the mayor told her that he had much appreciated the museum and begun to rethink his position on contemporary art. The museum also partnered with the Penrith Panthers rugby team. "They were looking to change their image as much as we were looking to change ours," Macgregor said.

Macgregor also began requiring that curators consult with less artistically inclined peers about the text in wall labels identifying and describing the adjacent works. "Sometimes it's an IT manager, sometimes it's a receptionist", she said later. "[I]t's about curators making sure their labels are legible to their peers."

After fending off a 2000 effort by the Art Gallery of New South Wales to annex the MCA, Macgregor began developing plans in 2002 for an extension to the museum. Two years later, developers sought to get the museum to agree to move off the Quay in order to build a luxury hotel on the site. In 2005, the museum's permanent collection was moved to storage offsite to create more exhibit space.

The sixfold increase in annual visitation that ensued made problems with the museum's ageing physical plant more apparent. "The elevators were well past their natural life, the stair circulation was not appropriate and there was no infrastructure to deal with disabled people", recalled Simon Mordant, a Sydney investment banker who later chaired the MCA board. "We started to burst at the seams." Some state officials, hoping to redevelop the site more commercially, urged the museum to move and tried to direct it to other locations, but Mordant and the museum management insisted on remaining, finding the current site to be a unique asset.

=== 2010–2012: Addition ===
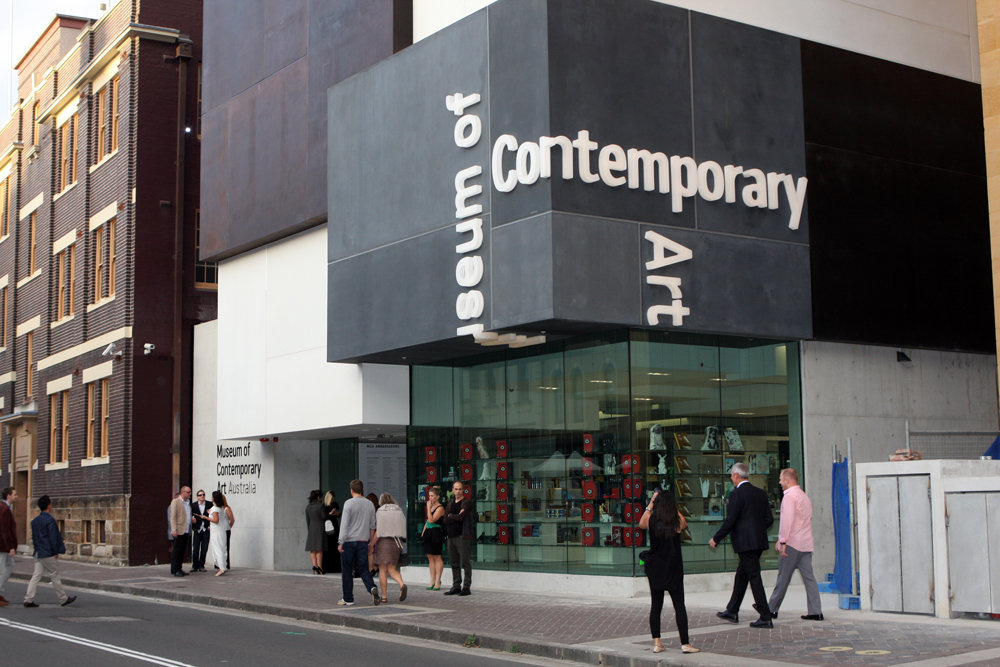
The museum's George St entrance in The Rocks

In 2010 the museum closed for its long-desired extensions. They were built to a design by Sydney architect Sam Marshall, taking two forms: infill on the building's west facade, allowing shop space on the ground floor facing George Street, and the new Mordant Wing on the north. The latter was named after the board chairman and his wife, whose initial gift of $10 million, followed by a later $5 million, was the largest single financial contribution to it, allaying concerns that the 2008 financial crisis would make the addition impossible to finance. The federal, state and city governments combined for $27 million; private benefactors donated the remaining $7.5 million of the building's total $53 million cost. From 2010 the building underwent a A$58 million expansion and re-development, It was constructed in a Cubist architectural style, appearing as a series of overlapping white, black, and brown boxes that contrasts with the main building.

The building reopened as the Museum of Contemporary Art Australia. A portion of the new wing opened with an exhibit of work by Rafael Lozano-Hemmer in December 2011; the remainder was opened the following March. The wing added 4,500 m^{2} (48,000 sq ft) in floor space, including a café, sculpture terrace and two harbour-side function venues, nearly doubling the museum's available exhibit space and allowing additional revenue to keep the museum financially independent. The renovations additionally supplied the new National Centre for Creative Learning with multimedia and digital studios, as well as a 117-seat lecture theatre. The dual entranceways of the new wing additionally connected George Street and Circular Quay for the first time.

Marshall's primary inspiration for the new wing was the sculptures of Donald Judd. The volumes of the individual blocks vary to reflect the function of the space within them. Their colors are taken from those appearing in the vicinity: the bridge, expressway, and various buildings in The Rocks, all visible from the museum. Marshall and the architects who reviewed and advised on his plans were mindful of modern additions to older museums that have not been seen as architecturally successful, such as Daniel Libeskind's addition to Toronto's Royal Ontario Museum, where the inclined walls precluded hanging paintings.

==== Reception ====
Before it was even opened in full the new wing had sharply divided architects and critics, primarily over the question of how it balanced the new and the old. The direct connection between George Street and the Quay was praised by most commentators regardless of their overall verdict. Elizabeth Farrelly, generally cool to the wing (Note: She would later clarify that "[m]y view is not that it's a bad building, but that it was badly briefed." She also feared that the style would not date well.) in a March 2012 Sydney Morning Herald opinion piece, called that connection "undeniably the new building's triumphant spatial moment." Artist Profile, much more enthusiastic about the addition, which it said "successfully fuses the old with the new by forging innovative ways through which audiences can interact with and understand the work on offer", used similar language. But both they and Farrelly thought that the entrance might have been better located at the MSB building's centre rather than the junction between the new and old wings.

Another aspect of the addition that bridged both positive and negative views of it was a belief that the MSB building should have been demolished. Farrelly, who did not express that opinion, wrote that the best thing about the new wing was that it was now obvious that "inside the World's Dreariest Building, something interesting is happening." In a glowing review, calling the building "a resounding success", ArchitectureAU's Penny Craswell said it was "unfortunate" that the MSB building had been retained. Architect Philip Cox, designer of The Star, Sydney casino on the nearby Pyrmont waterfront, who called the addition "bland architecture of old with the bland architecture of new", told Marshall at a debate that the MCA building should have been demolished, as the SANAA plan had proposed, so the museum could start afresh: "There was a one in 500-year opportunity to do a great building at Circular Quay." Marshall allowed that if he could have demolished the MCA building, he would have.

Anderson, the architect who had supervised the original adaptation of the MSB into the MCA, was also unimpressed with the addition, calling it "insensitive" to the original building. "As you get closer and closer to a building there should be finer details that hold the eye and delight. With this building as you move closer there is nothing more to see", he told the Herald. He was also critical of the building's lack of windows on its north and east faces. "That's the most iconic view in Sydney ignored."

=== 2012–2019: Growth ===
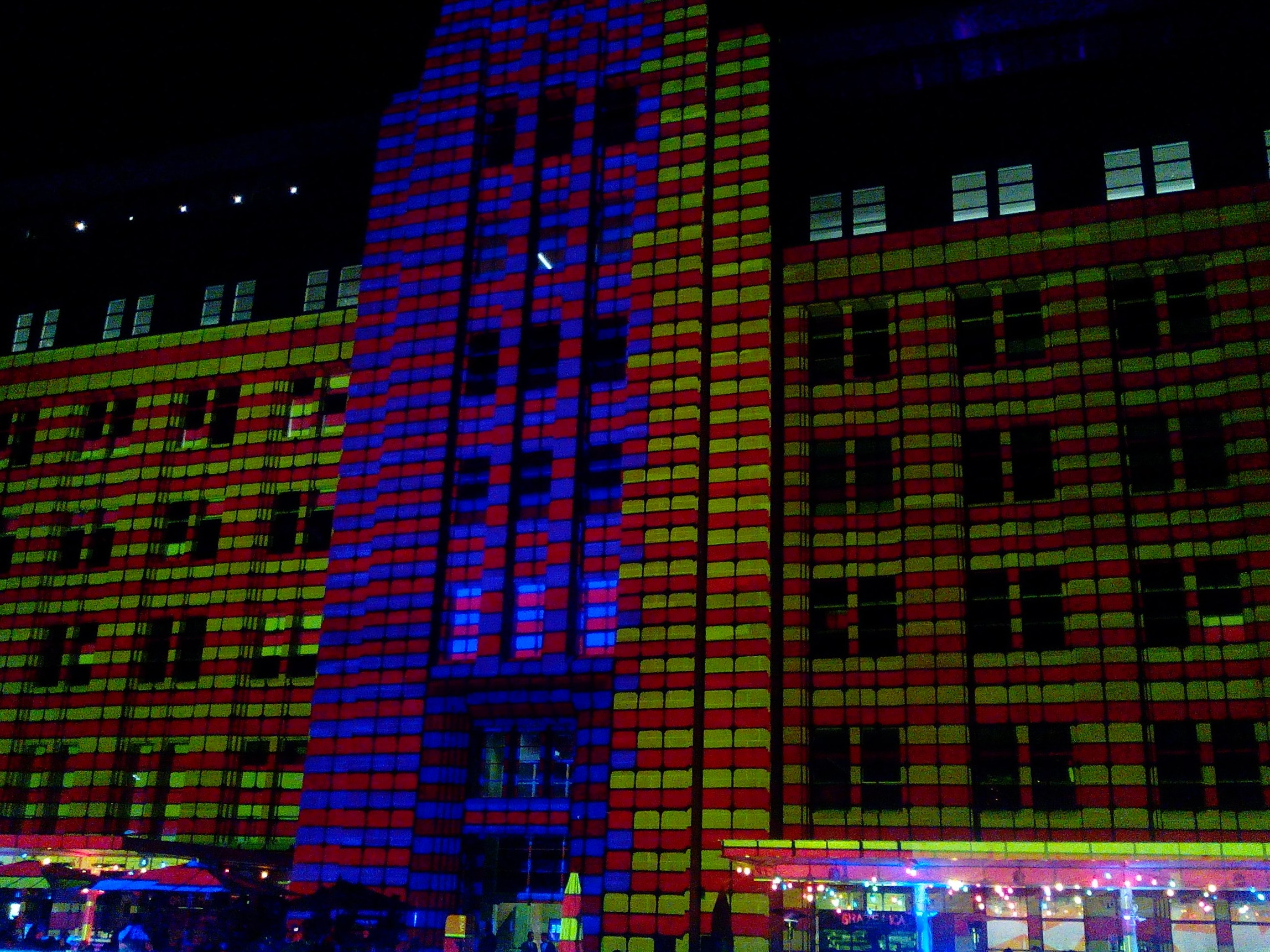
Image projected on the MCA during Vivid 2015

With the new addition completed, museum attendance in 2012 reached nearly 850,000, a 31 per cent increase from the last time it had been fully opening two years prior. In 2015 the Herald noted that the MCA had become as popular with museumgoers as the Art Gallery of New South Wales, despite receiving much less government funding. In the years afterward, the MCA began exceeding a million visitors annually, with a new record of 1.1 million in 2018, more than London's Serpentine Galleries and Beijing's UCCA Center for Contemporary Art attracted that same year. International and younger visitors account for significant shares of the MCA visitation, at 40 and 46 per cent respectively.

In 2019 Macgregor, recalling the beginning of her career driving a traveling contemporary art exhibit around Scotland in a bus, told The Art Newspaper that "I have a great belief that contemporary art should and could be for everyone." To that end, she hired around 84 working artists for the museum's visitor services team, particularly in the front of the house and as educators. "We are probably the largest employer of artists in Australia," says Mordant. "I think that is one reason for our success—we place artists at the centre of everything we do."

The artists on staff who interact with the public are also trained to make the work on display accessible to the public. "We don't shy away from putting on difficult art, but we want people to feel comfortable while they engage with it", says Macgregor. In late 2017 the museum put on one of its most successful exhibits ever, Pipilotti Rist's Sip My Ocean. "It set a benchmark that I don't know if we'll ever reach again", she recalled. Tickets to it sold out regularly over the nearly four months it was at the MCA; the museum extended its hours and offered special "unplugged" nights where selfies were forbidden to accommodate the crowds. Macgregor credited the coincidence of an exhibit by an artist whose work celebrates the female body opening just as the #MeToo movement began trending worldwide. For 2019 the museum's visitation again exceeded a million; according to The Art Newspaper this made it the world's most-visited contemporary art museum.

=== 2020–present: Pandemic and leadership changes ===
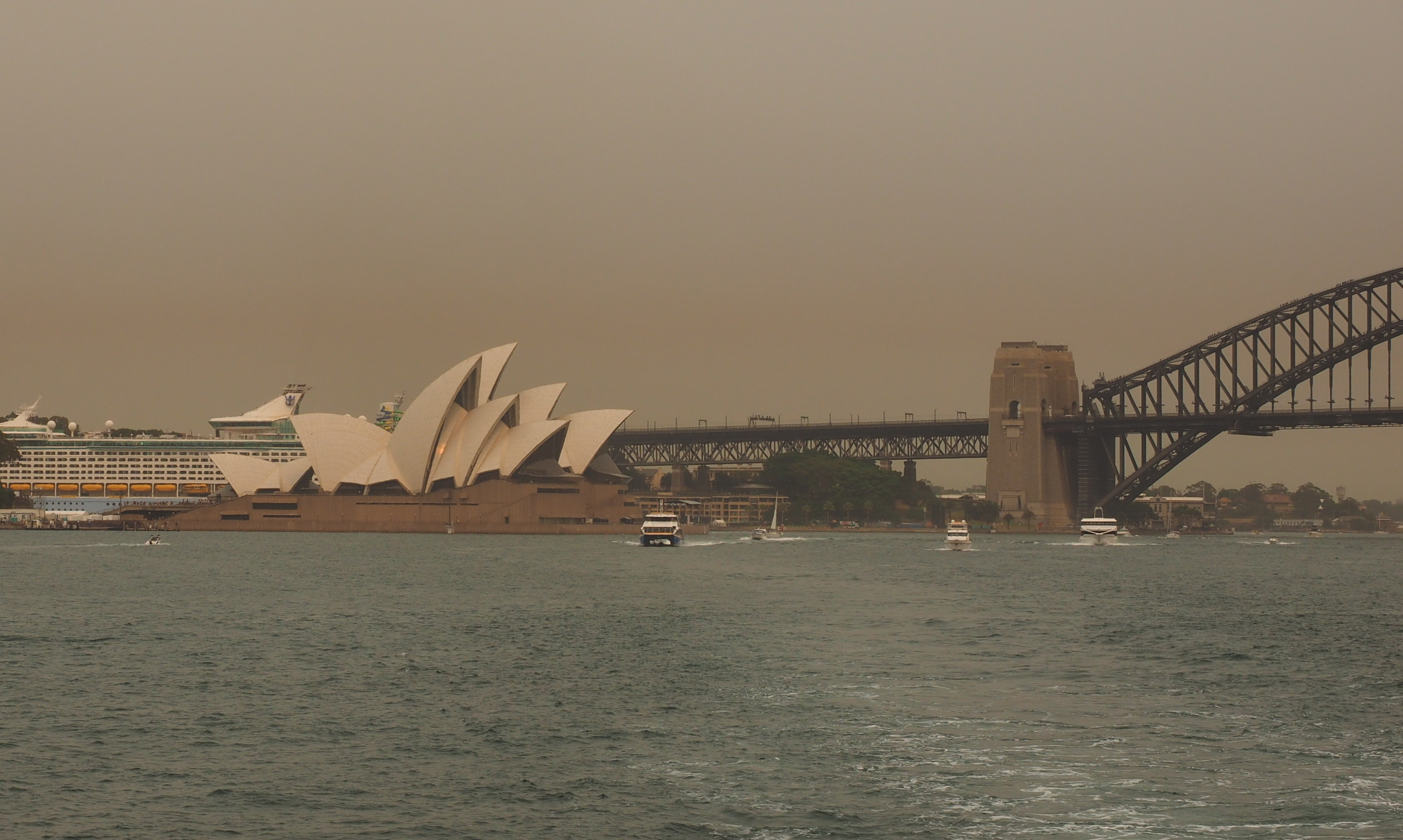
Smoky skies and haze in Sydney from the December 2019 bushfires

Those increased attendance numbers did not last. The severe bushfires that began in summer 2019 had the effect of depressing tourism in New South Wales, and just as the fires were finally being extinguished the COVID-19 pandemic began. The Australian government limited all non-essential indoor gatherings to a hundred people, including staff; the MCA complied with the order by severely limiting attendance.

By May all galleries and museums in the country were closed indefinitely. In the absence of foot traffic, Macgregor estimated, 40 per cent of the museum's funding was lost instantly, which she said made "our much-lauded funding mix" problematic, as the MCA relies on government support for only a quarter of its budget, unlike other institutions for which it constitutes the majority of funding. The museum relied at first on its donor base, which Macgregor said was very willing to let it use the money they had contributed with other purposes in mind for the more basic purpose of keeping the museum running. Because of that reliance on private funding, later the MCA was able to tap the government JobKeeper program to keep staff on the payroll, which helped it avoid some "truly horrible" scenarios such as the voluntary administration that Carriageworks, elsewhere in Sydney, had been forced into by then as the pandemic dried up its revenue stream, or laying off 30 per cent of its staff. The MCA established digital online programs to keep the public engaged. When Macgregor learned that many of the children at schools in West Sydney the museum had been doing outreach to did not have Internet access at home, she reached out to The Daily Telegraph, and the museum staff wound up producing the creative activities section for the paper's Hibernate supplement for the duration of the lockdowns. In June the museum was able to reopen at least for visits to the exhibit halls by individuals or small groups and stay open through October.

During this break, the museum's leadership changed. In July 2020, Lorraine Tarabay, another investment banker and contemporary art collector, took over the chair of the board from Mordant, who remains involved with the museum as its international ambassador. Artist Danie Mellor also joined the 11-member board, which already included Qantas head Alan Joyce, Carnival Australia head Ann Sherry and other prominent individuals from the art and business worlds.

By the end of 2020, the museum had been closed for 114 days. Visitation had dropped by nearly two-thirds from 2019, to under 370,000. In February 2021 the museum opened a major rehang of its permanent collection on the second floor, and in October the entire museum was able to reopen, albeit with strict health protocols required by the state in place, not only the previous capacity restrictions but mask requirements throughout the building and proof of vaccination required for all visitors over 16. Exhibitions by Richard Bell and Doug Aitken greeted those museumgoers who returned.

Within her first year as chair, Tarabay oversaw the hiring process for a new director when Macgregor stepped down in March 2021 after 22 years at the MCA to return to Scotland and spend more time with her family. Melbourne native Suzanne Cotter, was hired to replace Macgregor in July 2021. Cotter had previously been director of the MUDAM in Luxembourg and the Serralves Foundation Museum of Contemporary Art in Portugal. Macgregor stayed in the position through October; Cotter formally assumed responsibilities in January 2022.

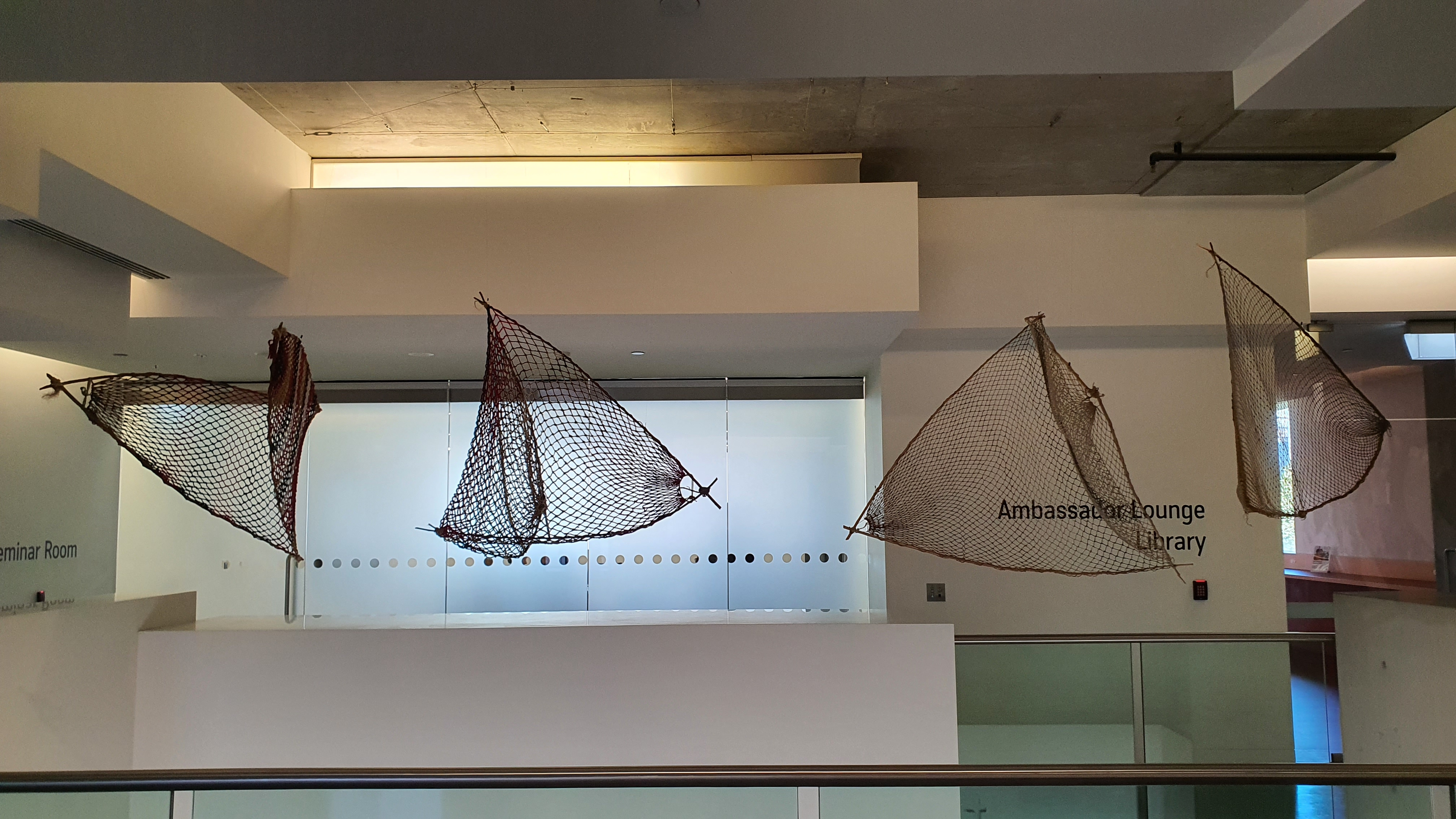
Hanging objects in the second floor

== Governance ==
The museum's direction is set by its board, which as of December 2024 has 11 members. Lorraine Tarabay is the current chair, having taken over from Simon Mordant in 2020 after joining the board four years previously. The Director, Suzanne Cotter, oversees a staff of five directors, who have responsibility for all areas of the museum's administration, from curation to digital production.

== Financing ==
An independent, not-for-profit organisation, the MCA raises over 85% of its revenue each year through donations and commercial activities to deliver its artistic and engagement programs. Director Macgregor made up for the loss of revenue from the abolition of the regular entrance fee at the beginning of her tenure with increased monetization of the museum's book and gift shops. "As one of my colleagues says, you charge them to get out", she told The Art Newspaper in 2019. The donation boxes at the entrances also captured additional funding from patrons, and after the 2010 renovations the cafés and rent from the spaces inside the museum ($4 million, according to Macgregor.) and shops and other tenants on George Street, including the 600-square-metre (6,500 sq ft) main offices of the Australian Olympic Committee, further supplemented the museum's self-generated income.

In the years before the pandemic, the museum had been taking $22–23 million annually (it dropped to $20 million in 2020) About 22 per cent of that (around $5 million) came in the form of government grants; the 2020 JobSeeker grant added an additional $3.8 million in public money. Another 24 per cent was from private and corporate donors; the rest came from its various other sources of revenue, such as spending at the shops, admission fees to special exhibitions and earned interest.

Most of the museum's revenue went to expenses, leaving a small surplus in 2018 but a half-million dollar deficit in 2019. A $4.5 million drop-in program expenses, combined with the JobSeeker grant, resulted in a $2.3 million surplus for 2020 (donations also increased tenfold, largely thanks to one individual). Macgregor said in early 2021 that the museum would still have a deficit the next year, and will need to find $800,000 in new funding every year "just to stand still".

However, an admission fee of $20 will be introduced on 31 January 2025, except for Australian students and persons under 18.

== Collections ==
What is now the museum's main collection emerged from the Power Collection in the original founding of the museum. The museum's initial acquisitions policy, based on the will of John Power, sought to acquire mainly international contemporary art whilst only "very occasionally" purchasing Australian art as complementary to its foreign collection. From 2002, the museum has shifted to increase its emphasis on Australian artists and as of 2020 held over 4,500 works. As of 2012 it was the only contemporary art museum in Australia with a permanent collection.

=== The Ramingining Collection ===
The Ramingining Collection, purchased in 1984–1985, comprises more than 250 works by over 80 Yolŋu artists from Ramingining, Arnhem Land, Northern Territory. As of 2023 the collection contains 257 items, consisting of bark paintings, woven objects, sculpture, and cultural objects such as spears and tools. The collection was originally acquired by the University of Sydney for the Power Collection following the 1984 exhibition Objects and Representations from Ramingining, curated by Djon Mundine for the Power Gallery of Contemporary Art. Mundine had created the collection between 1981 and 1984, when he was an arts adviser at Bula'Bula Arts in Ramingining.

In 1996, the Ramingining Collection was displayed at the MCA; its first exhibition, The Native Born: Objects and Representations from Ramingining, Arnhem Land, was curated by Djon Mundine. Four years later, to coincide with the Sydney Olympics, it was displayed in the entrance galleries in the exhibition Yolnu Science: Objects and Representations from Ramingining, Arnhem Land, curated by Djon Mundine and Linda Michael.

=== The Maningrida Collection ===
Formed by Diane Moon in 1990, the Maningrida Collection contains 560 works from the Maningrida community in Arnhem Land, Northern Territory. Ownership of the pieces belongs to the Maningrida people, with the collection subject to a unique cultural agreement between the museum and the community. The collection includes sculpture, woven objects and bark paintings. The museum works with Indigenous researchers, curators and artists and Maningrida Arts and Culture to document and research objects within the collection. The cultural agreement between both parties is renegotiated regularly to ensure a positive relationship.

In 2018, the MCA in association with Maningrida Arts and Culture held the John Mawurndjul: I am the old and new exhibition of works by John Mawurndjul. More than 130,000 people attended; it was additionally displayed at eight regional Australian galleries. Two works by John Mawurndjul, Nawarramulmul (Shooting Star Spirit, 1988) and Ngalyod (Female Rainbow Serpent, 1988), were the first artworks acquired for the dedicated MCA collection in 1989.

=== The Arnott's Collection ===
The Arnott's Collection was formed following the donation of 285 bark paintings by the Arnott family in 1993. The collection featured in Djon Mundine's 2008 exhibition They are meditating: bark paintings from the MCA's Arnott's Collection.

=== The Smorgon Collection ===
The Smorgon Collection was donated to the MCA in 1995 by philanthropists Loti and Victor Smorgon. It contains 149 contemporary Australian works from the 1980s and 1990s. In 2012, a donation by Loti went to build a sculpture terrace on the museum's fourth level, subsequently named for her.

== Selected temporary exhibitions ==
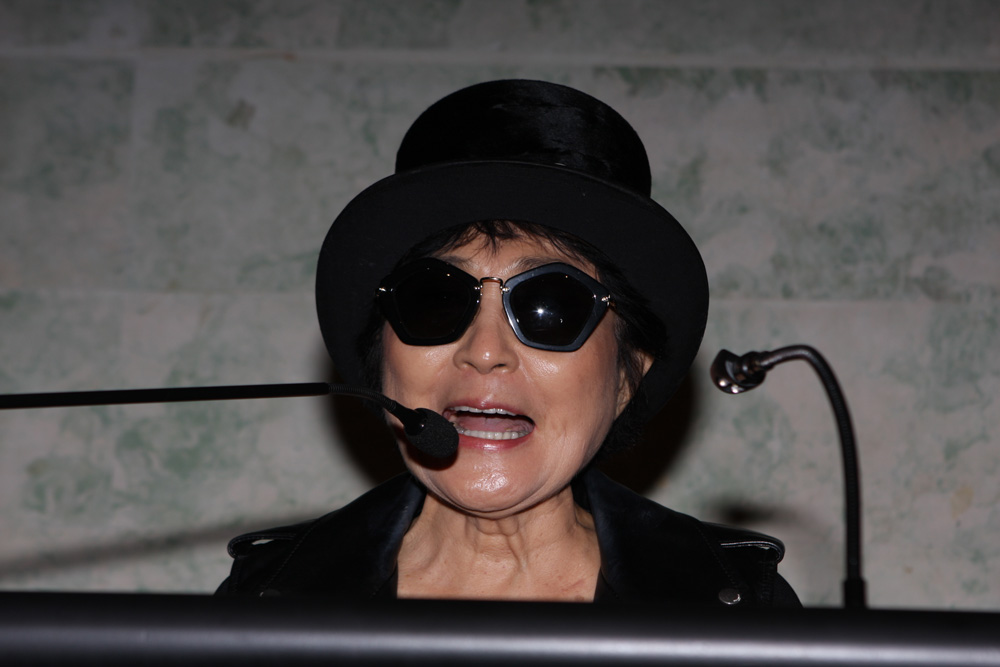
Yoko Ono at the opening of her exhibition in 2013

- Ricky Swallow – 'Bent Forms #1-#4' (2025)
- Pipilotti Rist – ‘Sip My Ocean’ (2018)
- Grayson Perry – ‘My Pretty Little Art Career’ (2016)
- Yoko Ono – ‘War is Over! (if you want it)’ (2013)
- Anish Kapoor (2013)
- Annie Leibovitz – ‘A Photographer’s Life 1990–2005’ (2011)
- Yayoi Kusama – ‘Mirrored Years’ (2009)
- Patricia Piccinini – ‘Call of the Wild’ (2002)
- Cindy Sherman – ‘Retrospective’ (1999)
- Marina Abramović – ‘objects, performance, video, sound’ (1998)
- Keith Haring (1996)
- Andy Warhol – 'Portraits’ (1994)

=== Primavera exhibition ===
Primavera: The Belinda Jackson Exhibit, Australia's longest running exhibition, has been staged annually since 1992 in honour of Edward and Cynthia Jackson's daughter Belinda, a jewellery maker. It exhibits the work of Australian artists aged 35 or younger for several summer months. Primavera provides the opportunity for artists not yet established to have their work displayed in a large institution. The exhibition often utilises guest curators, although curatorial staff from the Museum of Contemporary Art have also worked on past Primaveras. Each yearly exhibit is designed with a unique theme. In 2011, as a result of the museum renovations, the Primavera exhibit was held off-site. Artworks from the exhibition were displayed in various places around the museum and throughout The Rocks area of Sydney.

=== Tate x MCA Collaboration ===
In 2015, a five-year collaborative project was announced between the Tate Galleries of Britain and the MCA for the mutual acquisition of contemporary Australian artworks. It is aimed at increasing the reputation of Australian art internationally. Funded by a $2.75 million donation from the Qantas Foundation, the galleries have acquired 23 pieces by 16 major Australian artists, many of which have been displayed at both institutions.

=== The National ===
The National is a series of biennial survey exhibitions featuring contemporary artists, run as a partnership between the Art Gallery of New South Wales, Carriageworks and the MCA and held across the three venues. The National: New Australian Art exhibition was launched in 2017, designed to "reflect the diversity of cultural, political and social perspectives that preoccupy [Australian] artists". The National was designed in three iterations, with the later ones in 2019 and 2021, exhibiting the work of 150 Australian artists.

== Programs ==
The Museum of Contemporary Art holds a number of public programs over its calendar year, including an Indigenous learning program and an 'Art + Dementia' research program.

=== The Bella program ===
The Bella program was established in 1993 by patrons Edward and Cynthia Jackson and the Jackson family. The program season previously coincided with the Primavera exhibition, however the addition of the National Centre for Creative Learning and funding from private benefactors in 2012 allowed for the Bella program to be run year-round. Tailored for young people the program focuses on issues of access to contemporary art for people with disabilities, and socially and financially disadvantaged individuals. The program offers sessions in the galleries and hands-on workshops.

In 2011, the Bella program collaborated with Good Vibrations, a touring interactive art project for young people and adults with disabilities. The caravan, designed by artists Bruce Odland and Michael Luck Schneider, is fitted with technical devices that create sensory responses to sights, sounds and vibrations.

The dedicated Bella Room was installed in the National Centre for Creative learning in 2012. Each year a new artist is commissioned to produce a work in the Bella Room concerned with a different type of disability. The room offers a sensory environment in which students, led by artist-educators, can interact with art.

=== GENEXT ===
'GENEXT' has been held since 2005 as a public engagement program aimed at young people aged from 12 to 18, run by MCA's Youth Committee. GENEXT is an after-hours program that includes activities such as live music, discussions, and art workshops. It is held four times annually and included over 16,000 participants over the course of its first ten years of operation.

In collaboration with the Art Gallery of New South Wales, the Museum of Contemporary Art takes part in the Sydney Festival and the Biennale of Sydney, an event held partially online in 2020 due to the pandemic.

=== MCA Zine Fair ===
The annual MCA Zine Fair, first held in 2008, is organised in conjunction with the Sydney Writers' Festival. Held on the front lawn of the MCA, it features over 50 stalls of new and established zine artists.

=== The Artful: Art and Dementia ===
In 2016, The Artful: Art and Dementia program was launched as a three-year research collaboration between the MCA, the Brain and Mind Centre, the University of Sydney and Dementia Australia with the goal of establishing a link between art and enhanced neuroplasticity. The program continues annually.

The six-week program includes a tour of selected works throughout the museum, weekly two-hour creative art-making sessions with trained artist-educators, and an 'Artful at home' package containing materials for art-making at home. The final week of the program is an exhibition session, in which participants' friends and family are invited to view their art. In 2020, the program launched an online digital toolkit to enable offsite participation.

== See also ==
- Architecture of Sydney
- List of art museums and galleries in Australia
- List of contemporary art museums
- List of most-visited art museums
- List of museums in Sydney
