= Power Institute of Fine Arts =

Department of the University of Sydney, Australia

The Power Institute of Fine Arts is a teaching and research department, encompassing the fields of art history and theory, within the University of Sydney. It was established from a bequest by artist John Joseph Wardell Power (1881–1943).

== Background ==
Founded in 1968, the institute was established out of a bequest from the expatriate Australian abstract artist John Wardell Power. The bequest provided for the establishment of a teaching department, a research library, and a gallery for contemporary exhibitions.

John Joseph Wardell Power (often referred to as J. W. Power) is the man who established the legacy of the teaching department which turned into the Power Institute of Fine Arts. He was born in 1881 in Sydney and died in 1943 in Jersey, Channel Islands. In 1905, after graduating from the University of Sydney with Bachelor of Medicine, Power went to London to continue with his medical studies. During the First World War, Power gained the rank of Captain when he served as a physician in the British Army. After he gave up the medical field, he enrolled as an art student in Paris.

== The institute ==
The institute has been especially active in developing and promoting the study of Australian art. Scholars associated with the Power Institute include Donald Brook, Bernard Smith, Terry Smith, Virginia Spate and Roger Benjamin. The institute funds the Schaeffer Fine Arts Library (formerly the Power Research Library, established in 1968). The library is closely associated with the Department of Art History at the University of Sydney and holds approximately 45,000 items including books, journals, video media and ephemera. The library also holds a collection of theses and essays donated by honours and higher-degree students since the establishment of the department. The Power Institute hosts and arranges national and international conferences and also funds publications through Power Publications.
