= Brett Goldspink =

Australian rugby league player (born 1971)

Personal information
- Born: 16 July 1970 (age 56) Australia

Playing information
- Position: Prop
Club
Years	Team	Pld	T	G	FG	P
1992–93	Illawarra Steelers	14	0	0	0	0
1994	South Sydney	20	2	0	0	8
1995–96	Western Reds	26	2	0	0	8
1997	Oldham Bears	21	1	0	0	4
1998	St Helens	24	2	0	0	8
1999	Wigan Warriors	22	1	0	0	4
2000–02	Halifax	70	2	0	0	8
	Total	197	10	0	0	40
- Father: Kevin Goldspink

Brett Goldspink is an Australian rugby league player who played professionally in England and Australia.

== Playing career ==
Goldspink played for Illawarra, South Sydney and Western Reds in Australia between 1992 and 1996.

Goldspink played for Souths in their upset 1994 Tooheys Challenge Cup final victory over Brisbane. He was part of the Reds inaugural side on 12 March 1995.

He then moved to England and played for the Oldham Bears, St. Helens, Wigan Warriors and Halifax between 1997 and 2002.
