= Maria Mercedes (actress) =

Australian actress

- Born: Maria Moutsidi; Melbourne, Australia
- Occupations: Actress, performer, singer
- Years active: 1973–present
- Known for: Nine; Sunset Boulevard; Love Never Dies; Neighbours; Kick

Maria Moutsidis (Greek: Μαρία Μουτσίδη, romanized: María Moutsídi), known professionally as Maria Mercedes, is a Greek-descended Australian television, film and stage actress, performer and singer. She is a mezzo soprano

== Early life ==
Mercedes was born in Melbourne to parents George and Dionisia Moutsidis, a working class couple who emigrated via ship to Australia from Greece, seeking better prospects. Her father had been as aspiring actor in Greece. She attended Brunswick High School in Melbourne.

== Career ==
=== Early career ===
Mercedes' performing career began in 1973 after winning singing contests on both Young Talent Time and New Faces. After subsequently performing on The Graham Kennedy Show, she was persuaded to change her last name from 'Moutsidis' to the stage name of 'Mercedes', after Kennedy struggled to pronounce her name. By the age of 16, she was singing around Australia, in concerts and variety shows.

In 1981, she released a cover version of The Crystals' "Then He Kissed Me", which she performed live on Countdown and Hey Hey It's Saturday.

=== Stage ===
Mercedes has appeared in numerous musical stage productions, having played Luisa Contini in Nine, Grizabella in Cats, Svetlana in Chess, Mama Morton in Chicago, Miss Sherman in Fame, the Wife in Seriously – Pet Shop Boys Reinterpreted, Power woman in Menopause The Musical, Madame Giry in Andrew Lloyd Webber's sequel to Phantom of the Opera – Love Never Dies and Melina Mercouri in Greek Goddess.

From 1996 to 1997, Mercedes received critical acclaim starring as the alternate Norma Desmond in the original Australian production of Andrew Lloyd Webber's Sunset Boulevard opposite Hugh Jackman. She eventually took over the role, giving almost 100 performances. In 2004, Mercedes was the first woman in the world to play Frank N Furter in The Rocky Horror Show. The performance was a charity show for "Variety", performed with the cast of Neighbours. She had previously toured Australia, playing the role of Magenta in a 1985 production.

Together with Kiyomi Vella, Susie Ahern and Ben Mingay, Mercedes performed in The Songs of James Bond, a two-hour concert featuring twenty two songs from the James Bond films.

In 2014 and 2015, Mercedes played opera star Maria Callas in the Terrence McNally play Master Class in Melbourne and at the Hayes Theatre in Sydney. In 2016, she joined the cast of the Greek-Australian migration play Taxithi by Helen Yotis Patterson, allowing her, for the first time in her theatrical career, to sing in Greek. In 2023, Mercedes took on the role of The Witch in a production of Stephen Sondheim's Into the Woods with the West Australian Opera.

=== Film and television ===
Mercedes' film roles include Nurse Panicale in 1978 cult thriller Patrick and Tasia in 1998 LGBTQ independent film Head On (alongside Alex Dimitriades). She was in 2004 film Dreams for Life playing the lead role of Ellen, a Greek woman hoping to make it as a dancer, much to the disapproval of her parents. She reprised her lauded stage role of Madame Giry in a 2012 film version of Love Never Dies. The following year, she appeared in the 2013 remake of Patrick, this time playing the role of the doctor. In 2018, she played Helen in 2018 film The Taverna.

Mercedes' television credits include two recurring roles as Irene Zervos and Yemmi Bakarta in cult series Prisoner and also appeared as Detective Ayoub in its reimagining Wentworth. She appeared in a recurring capacity as Shirley Maclaine in soap opera E Street in 1993, and then featured in two TV movies – 1995's Cody: The Wrong Stuff and 1996's Whipping Boy. Mercedes played recurring roles in long-running soap opera Neighbours, firstly from 2004 to 2005 as Lucia Cammeniti, then in 2007 as Estelle Petrides. That same year, she starred as Dora Mavros in SBS miniseries Kick.

Mercedes had guest roles in several police procedural series Division 4, Homicide, Bluey and Cop Shop. She guested in drama Patrol Boat, police series Special Squad, sci-fi series Thunderstone, detective mystery Miss Fisher's Murder Mysteries and its spin-off Ms Fisher's Modern Murder Mysteries and comedy drama House Husbands. Mercedes also had guest roles in the Underbelly spin-off Fat Tony & Co. (based on the true story of criminal Tony Mokbel's capture in Greece), comedy web miniseries Footballer Wants a Wife, sci-fi mystery-drama Bloom and drama-thriller The Tourist (along side Irish actor Jamie Dornan and an international cast).

Mercedes has also performed as a singer on numerous variety shows including Young Talent Time, New Faces, In Melbourne Tonight, The Don Lane Show, Good Morning Australia, The Midday Show, Bandstand, The Mike Walsh Show, Countdown, Hey Hey It's Saturday and Greeks on the Roof. She continues to perform in concerts and at events, and also mentors emerging performance artists. She cites her early musical influences as being Shirley Bassey and Cher.

== Personal life ==
Mercedes has been open about having been sexually abused at the hands of a Hawthorn-based Greek doctor in Melbourne, before the age of 21, leading to her suffering from panic attacks and chronic anxiety. In total, 48 women came forward to accuse the since retired doctor of similar incidents occurring between 1978 and 2004. The case was brought before court, before ultimately being dropped due to the doctor being deemed 'unfit to face trial' due to cognitive impairment. He handed in his licence and retired in 2017.

== Filmography ==
=== Film ===
Year	Title	Role	Notes
1978	Patrick	Nurse Panicale	Feature film
1998	Head On	Tasia	Feature film
2004	Dreams for Life	Ellen	Feature film
2012	Love Never Dies	Madame Giry	Feature film
2013	Patrick	Ed's Doctor	Feature film (remake)
2019	The Taverna	Helen	Feature film
2023	So Much Smoke	Angelina	Short film

=== Television ===
Year	Title	Role	Notes
1974; 1975	Division 4	Factory Girl / Christina Lamorica	2 episodes
1975	Homicide	Francesca Carlotti / Anna Petrelli	2 episodes
1977	Bluey	Teresa	Episode 18: "Stop the Press"
1978	Cop Shop	Judy	1 episode
1979	Patrol Boat		Episode: "Which Way's Mecca?"
1979; 1984–1985	Prisoner	Irene Zervos / Yemmi Bakarta	5 episodes / 10 episodes
1984	Special Squad	Maria Baxter	Episode 28: "Hot Streets"
1993	E Street	Shirley Maclaine	4 episodes
1995	Cody: The Wrong Stuff	Raquel	TV movie
1996	Whipping Boy	Saphra	TV movie
1999	Thunderstone	Ivana	2 episodes
2003	Greeks on the Roof	Poppy	11 episodes
2004–2005; 2007; 2022	Neighbours	Lucia Cammeniti / Estelle Petrides	6 episodes / 16 episodes
2007	Kick	Dora Mavros	Miniseries, 13 episodes
2012	Miss Fisher's Murder Mysteries	Madame Breda	Episode: "Cocaine Blues"
2013	House Husbands	Mrs. Panas	1 episode
2014	Fat Tony & Co	Agape Makrakanis	1 episode
2015	Footballer Wants a Wife	Mama	2 episodes
2017–2018	Wentworth	Detective Ayoub	3 episodes
2019	Bloom	Margot	3 episodes
2019	Ms Fisher's Modern Murder Mysteries	Joyce Hirsch	Episode: "Just Murdered"
2022	The Tourist	Freddie Lanagan	2 episodes
2022	Neighbours	Lucia Cammeniti / Estelle Petrides	6 episodes / 16 episodes

=== Other appearances ===
Year	Title	Role	Notes
1973	New Faces	Contestant	3 episodes
1973	Young Talent Time	Contestant (singing "This Is My Life")	1 episode
1973; 1975	The Graham Kennedy Show	Performer / singer	2 episodes
1974	Ted Hamilton's Musical World	Singer	1 episode
1974–1975	The Ernie Sigley Show	Regular performer / singer	11 episodes
1975	Young Talent Time	Guest performer	1 episode
1975	The Don Lane Show	Singer / Performer (singing "I Feel The Earth Move")	TV series, 1 episode
1975	Australian Popular Song Festival	Singer / performer	TV special
1976	Bandstand '76	Singer	TV series, 1 episode
1978	The Don Lane Show	Singer / performer	1 episode
1981	Countdown	Performer with band Toy Show (singing "Then He Kissed Me")	TV series, 1 episode
1988	Hey Hey It's Saturday	Performer (singing "My Husband Makes Movies")	1 episode
1988–1989	The Bert Newton Show	Regular performer	8 episodes
1989	Hey Hey It's Saturday	Performer (singing "I Know Him So Well" with Jodie Gillies)	1 episode
1997	Hey Hey It's Saturday	Performer (singing "Promises, Promises" with Jackie Rees)	1 episode
1997	Sale of the Century	Guest	1 episode

== Theatre ==
Year	Title	Role	Venue / Company
1980	Maria Mercedes	Herself	Palais Royale, Newcastle
1985	The Rocky Horror Show	Magenta / Usherette	VIC, TAS & ACT tour
1988	Cats	Grizabella	Her Majesty's Theatre, Melbourne with Cameron Mackintosh Productions
1987–1988	Nine	Luisa Contini	Comedy Theatre, Melbourne, Festival Theatre, Adelaide, Lyric Theatre, Brisbane, Her Majesty's Theatre, Sydney
1990	Chess	Svetlana Sergievsky	Theatre Royal, Sydney
1991	Forbidden Broadway	Liza / Barbra / Chita	Kinselas, Sydney
1991	Wherefore Art Thou Cabaret?		Hayden Room, Sydney
1992	Shadow and Splendour	Sophie Lenz / Mozart singer	Suncorp Theatre, Brisbane for QTC & STCSA
1993	A Bedfull of Foreigners		West End Rialto, Brisbane, Seymour Centre, Playhouse Adelaide
1996	And the World Goes ‘Round		Sydney Opera House
1996	Sunset Boulevard	Norma Desmond	Regent Theatre, Melbourne
1997	A One Night Stand with the Stars of Australian Musical Theatre	Singer	Melbourne Athenaeum
1999	Zorba the Greek	The Leader	Capitol Theatre, Sydney
2000	Gypsy	Miss Mazeppa	State Theatre, Melbourne for The Production Company
2000	Chicago	Mama Morton	Her Majesty's Theatre, Melbourne, Lyric Theatre, Brisbane & Asian tour
2001	The Vagina Monologues		
2000; 2002	Fame	Miss Sherman	Adelaide Festival Theatre & Asian tour
2004	The Rocky Horror Show (charity show for Variety)	Dr Frank N Furter	with the cast of Neighbours
2006; 2007	Seriously – Pet Shop Boys Reinterpreted	The Wife	Chapel Off Chapel for Midsumma Festival, Edinburgh Fringe Festival
2008–2010	Menopause The Musical	Power Woman / The Soap Star	Australian tour
2010	Words and Music from Life's a Circus & More		Notes, Newtown
2012	Love Never Dies (sequel to Phantom of the Opera)	Madame Giry	Capitol Theatre, Sydney, Regent Theatre, Melbourne
2013	The Songs of James Bond concert	Singer	Melbourne Athenaeum
2014–2016	Master Class	Maria Callas	Fortyfivedownstairs, Melbourne, Hayes Theatre Sydney, Geelong Arts Centre, Whitehorse Centre, Frankston Arts Centre
2017	Greek Goddess	Melina Mercouri	Black Box Theatre, Melbourne, Gasworks Theatre, Melbourne
2016; 2019	Taxithi – An Australian Odyssey	The Greek Fate	Fortyfivedownstairs, Space Theatre, Adelaide
2019–2020	Anthem		Playhouse, Melbourne, Roslyn Packer Theatre with Performing Lines for Melbourne International Arts Festival & Sydney Festival
2023	Bloom	Betty / Chef	Playhouse, Melbourne with MTC
2023	Into the Woods	The Witch	West Australian Opera
2024	Candide	Old Lady	Palais Theatre, Melbourne
2025	Bloom (Sydney transfer)	Betty/Chef	Roslyn Packer Theatre with Sydney Theatre Company
2026	Ned Kelly	Ma Kelly	Her Majesty's Theatre, Ballarat, Union Theatre, Melbourne with Victorian Opera

== Awards ==
Year	Work	Award	Category	Result
1987	Nine: The Musical	ARIA Award	Best Original Soundtrack or Cast Album	Won
1987	Nine: The Musical	Green Room Award	Best Actress in a Musical	Nominated
1988	Nine: The Musical	Sydney Theatre Critics Awards	Best Actress in a Musical	Nominated
1991	Firbidden Broadway: The Musical	Mo Award		Won
2006	Dreams for Life	Cyprus International Film Festival	Best Actress in a Leading Role	Nominated
2015	Master Class	Green Room Award	Outstanding Female Performer (Independent Theatre)	Won
