= John Joseph Wardell Power =

Australian Modernist artist

John Joseph Wardell Power (12 October 1881 – 1 August 1943), often referred to as J. W. Power, was an Australian modernist artist who practised his art in England and Europe. The Power Institute of Fine Arts at the University of Sydney bears his name.

== Early life and education ==
John Joseph Wardell Power was born in Sydney on 12 October 1881. He is the grandson of architect William Wardell, and his daughter encouraged John to draw and paint from the age of seven.

After attending Sydney Grammar School, Power studied medicine at the University of Sydney, graduating with a Bachelor of Medicine in 1905.

== Early career and further studies ==
Power moved to London in 1906 to further his studies in medicine, and practised as a doctor there for several years, before serving in the Royal Army Medical Corps from 1917 to 1918, during the First World War.

After the war left medicine and studied art at the atelier of Brazilian-born artist Pedro Luiz Correia de Araújo in Paris from 1920 to 1922, where he became interested in Cubism and abstract art. He also studied under Fernand Léger at the Académie Moderne, which was an important part of the development of the inter-war avant-garde movement.

== Art career ==
Power's first solo exhibition was in London in 1927. He was a member of The London Group and Abstraction-Création in Paris.

He had a studio in Paris, and was represented by Parisian gallery owner Léonce Rosenberg.

Power authored the book Eléments de la construction picturale (Paris, 1932), which "marked his arrival in Paris". In this treatise, he acknowledges a Brazilian painter, Pedro Correia de Araújo (who he calls Senhor Pedro Araujo) as the one who introduced him to the subject.

In 1934, a solo show of his work was held in Paris by Abstraction-Création.

He lived in London, Paris, Brussels, and Bournemouth, before moving to Bellozanne on the island of Jersey in the Channel Islands. He met Pablo Picasso in Paris in the 1920s and around 1931 he bought ten signed prints from him. Despite his success and his prolific output in England and France, Power remained relatively unknown in Australia, but always identified as Australian.

== Death and legacy ==
Power, often referred to as J. W. Power, died of cancer in Jersey during the German occupation of the Channel Islands, on 1 August 1943.

He had written his will in September 1939, in which he left most of his estate, after the death of his wife, Edith, to the University of Sydney "to make available to the people of Australia the latest ideas and theories in the plastic arts by means of lectures and teaching and by the purchase of the most recent contemporary art of the world... so as to bring the people of Australia in more direct touch with the latest art developments in other countries".

=== NLA collection ===
Edith Power's inheritance included his Picasso prints and collection of art books, and continued to live on Jersey. After her death in 1961, they were bequeathed to her niece, Ida Gertrude Traill, who lived in Bathurst, New South Wales. Traill bequeathed the Power Collection to the National Library of Australia (NLA) after her death in 1976. The collection, apart from the Picasso prints, includes Power's sketchbooks and a considerable collection of books on art and architecture. The NLA also holds personal papers and printed material.

=== Power Institute of Fine Arts ===
His estate (worth £A2 million) went to the University of Sydney, where the Power Institute of Fine Arts now bears his name. The Power Institute, established in 1968, is the university's art history department. His effect on art history in Australia was significant.

=== John Power Memorial Lecture ===
The inaugural John Power Memorial Lecture was delivered at the University of Sydney by American art critic Clement Greenberg in 1968. In the following year, Donald Brook, artist and lecturer in the history of sculpture at the Power Institute of Fine Arts, gave the second John Power lecture, "Flight from the Object".

=== MCA Australia ===
Part of the Power bequest provided the core funding to set up Sydney's Museum of Contemporary Art in 1989.

=== Exhibitions ===
In 2014, the NLA held a retrospective exhibition of Power's work, Abstraction-Création: J. W. Power in Europe 1921–1938, which brought together for the first time his paintings from the University of Sydney and his sketchbooks held by the library.

The Chau Chak Wing Museum in Sydney held the first comprehensive survey of Potter's art, J. W. Power: Art, war and the avant-garde, from July 2025 to February 2026.
