= Nikon-Walkley Australian Press Photographer of the Year =

Australian journalism award

The Nikon-Walkley Australian Press Photographer of the Year, or Nikon-Walkley Press Photographer of the Year is awarded to the photographer whose body of work is considered the best in the country for that year. It recognises newsworthiness, impact, technical superiority, creativity and originality in news photography.

The annual Nikon-Walkley Photographic Awards are the highest honour for Australian press photographers. They represent the pinnacle of achievement and are judged by a panel of senior photographers and picture editors across the industry.

It was first awarded in 1969 as a separate award, but in 2000 merged with the Walkley Awards to create the current prize.

Partial list of winners:

Year	Recipient(s)	Story/Issue	Publisher	Source
1965	Jim Fenwick	Kaptain Neilson disaster	The Courier Mail	
1969	Barrie Ward		The Daily Mirror	
1970	Ted Golding		The Sydney Morning Herald	
1971	Mervyn Bishop		The Sydney Morning Herald	
1972	Bill McAuley		The Daily Telegraph	
1973	John Lamb			
1974				
1975	Ken Rainsbury		The Herald	
1976				
1977	John Casamento			
1978	Kenneth (Rick) Stevens		The Sydney Morning Herald	
1979	John Lamb			
1980	Jim Fenwick		The Courier Mail	
1981	Stuart Riley		The Courier Mail	
1982	Paul Mathews		The Sydney Morning Herald	
1983				
1984				
1985	Peter O'Halloran			
1986	Paul Wright		The Sydney Morning Herald	
1987	Michael Amendolia			
1988	Kenneth (Rick) Stevens		Freelance	
1989	Paul Mathews		The Sydney Morning Herald	
1990				
1991				
1992	Kevin Bull		"The Advertiser Adelaide"	
1993				
1994	Dean Sewell		The Sydney Morning Herald	
1995	Jack Atley		The Age	
1996				
1997	Craig Borrow		Herald Sun	
1998	Dean Sewell		The Sydney Morning Herald	
1999	Jason South		The Age	
2000	Grant Turner		The Daily Telegraph	
2001	Phil Hillyard	Portfolio	The Advertiser	
2002	Nick Moir		The Sydney Morning Herald	
2003	Jason South	Iraq	The Age	
2004	Adam Pretty	Athens Olympics Essay	Getty Images	
2005	Renee Nowytarger		The Australian	
2006	Kate Geraghty		Sydney Morning Herald	
2007	Kate Geraghty	John Elliot	Sydney Morning Herald	
2008	David Gray		Reuters	
2009	Renee Nowytarger		The Australian	
2010	Jason South		The Age	
2011	Phil Hillyard		The Daily Telegraph	
2012	Justin McManus		The Age	
2013	Kate Geraghty		Fairfax Media	
2014	Andrew Quilty		Oculi	
2015	Gary Ramage		News Corp Australia	
2016	Alex Coppel		Herald Sun	
2017	Kate Geraghty		Fairfax Media	
2018	Dean Lewins		NBCnews.com, The Sydney Morning Herald, The Guardian, The Australian and Time	
2019	Chris McGrath		Getty Images	
2020	Matthew Abbott		The New York Times	
2021	Alex Coppel		Herald Sun, The Daily Telegraph and The Courier-Mail	
2022	Brendan Esposito		ABC	
2023	Jake Nowakowski		Herald Sun	
2024	Nick Moir		The Sydney Morning Herald	
2025	Christopher Hopkins		Freelance, Al Jazeera, The Age, The Guardian	

== See also ==
- Walkley Awards
