= POL (magazine) =

1960s Australian monthly magazine

POL, was a monthly Australian society and culture magazine. Under the control of Gareth Powell Publishing until 1972 when it was acquired by Sungravure. It is considered to have played an important role in raising awareness of the status of women, and establishing new standards in terms of content, design and photography.

POL began publication in 1969 as a women's magazine and ceased publication in 1986.

== History ==
In March–May 2003, the Australian National Portrait Gallery in Old Parliament House, Canberra, held a retrospective of POL magazine which it called Portrait of a Generation. A catalogue was published for the occasion, with an introduction which said:

POL magazine was a perfect fit for its time. The magazine first appeared in Sydney in 1968, produced by Gareth Powell, an eccentric, entrepreneurial British publisher who knew, above anything else, how to employ talented people and give them the freedom to work. POL quickly came to reflect a changing Australia that had been radicalised by the sixties.

Gareth Powell has been quoted as saying that the name POL stood for nothing, and was chosen by the magazine's first editor, Richard Walsh, because it was short and lent itself to bad puns in headlines.

A major influence on the style of the magazine was the photographic and design team that had started with Chance International, one of the early men's magazines in Australia. The photographers Colin Beard, Greg Barrett, Anthony Crowell, Rennie Ellis, Douglas Holleley, Brett Hilder, Graham McCarter, Jacqueline Mitelman, Lewis Morley, Dieter Muller, Grant Mudford, Robyn Stacey Wesley Stacey and Greg Weight were among the best that Australia had produced, and they were given the opportunity with both POL and Chance to choose the photographs used and to decide how they should be displayed. No other magazine in Australia at that time allowed that sort of involvement by the creative staff.

The only person who was kept well away from the creative process was the publisher and owner, Gareth Powell. He knew printing - and POL set new standards in that area for Australia - and he knew publishing. But the editorial content of the magazine was, in its earliest and finest days, totally under the control of Richard Walsh and his team. Guest editors included Germaine Greer (1972) and Richard Neville (1974).

After Richard Walsh's departure, and the sale of POL magazine to Sungravure in 1972, Maggie Makeig, formerly of Everybody's, took over as editor. She edited POL from early 1972 until her untimely death in July 1976. She organised Australia's first nude male centrefold, long before Cleo was launched. The star of this centrefold was Paul du Feu, the former husband of feminist icon Germaine Greer. A friend of Greer's, Makeig also organised and oversaw Germaine as guest editor for an edition of POL as well as Richard Neville in 1974. She was also responsible for employing David Leigh as art director and brought award winning writers on board. She was revered as a ground breaker with coverlines during the days of Number 96, which featured actress Pat McDonald as Dorrie Evans in evening gown and the line "Charity is not all Balls".

Arnold Earnshaw edited POL for eight months and from 1977 to 1984 the magazine was edited by Robin Ingram who was responsible for recruiting Don Dunstan to act as guest editor, a role he performed from May 1980 for just under a year.

David Leigh, who won several international graphic design awards, was POL's Art Director for a decade from the mid 70s.

POL ceased publication in 1986.
