= Wesley Stacey =

Australian photographer (1941–2023)

Wesley Stacey (1941 – 9 February 2023) was an Australian photographer and photojournalist who was a co-founder of the Australian Centre for Photography. Exhibited widely, including at the Serpentine Gallery, London, Art Gallery of New South Wales, and a retrospective at the National Gallery of Australia in 1991, his work has been collected by the NGA, the National Gallery of Victoria and the AGNSW.

== Early life and training ==
Born at Fairlight in Sydney, New South Wales, to Australian-born Alice (née) Steele and Edward Wesley, a bank clerk who was English migrant and a Sunday painter. His sibling Sandra was born two years later. The family moved house among northern suburbs of Manly, Balgowlah and Cammeray and in 1953 his parents separated and he lived with his father, grandmother and sister in Cammeray. For three years he attended Trinity Grammar Boarding School from 1953-55 and while there, and encouraged by his mother and his cousin David Stacey, took up photography, constructing and using a pinhole camera and a Box Brownie. For his final years of schooling 1954-6, Wesley went to Mosman Intermediate High school leaving with the Intermediate Certificate aged fifteen.

From 1957 to 1959 'Wes' Stacey was a screen-printers apprentice and in 1960 set up his own darkroom, and studied drawing and design at East Sydney Technical College while working as assistant ABC TV graphic designer. After finishing his studies in 1962 he continued in design and photography work in Sydney and married Barbara (née Wilson) and rented in Lewisham. Aged twenty-three in 1964, held his first exhibition of photography; the thirteen large black and white prints on board in A Showing of Photographic Panels at Goldstein Hall in the University of New South Wales in June strongly evidenced his Christian faith and church activities and his interest in Sidney Nolan's and Russell Drysdale's expressionist Central Australian landscapes. In the autumn of 1964, and taking long service leave from the ABC, he and Barbara boarded the Canberra to sailed for England where he was employed by BBC TV (1964–66), during which time he photographed the landscape and architecture of England and Wales.

In 1968 Stacey returned to "find his Australian roots" and joined Gareth Powell's Chance and POL magazines in Sydney then until 1976 freelanced as a commercial photographer specialising in architecture, travel, environment and heritage.

In 1973 Stacey with David Moore served on the original committee to plan and establish the Australian Centre for Photography in Sydney.

== Architectural photography ==
Stacey with architect Philip Cox conducted a large-scale project promoting the preservation of Australia's colonial architecture in rural and urban areas as part of a consciousness-raising by members of the National Trust around Australia engaging with the history of Australian architecture. The publication Rude Timber Buildings in Australia authored by Philip Cox and J M Freeland with Stacey's photographs centred on rural buildings built exclusively from timber, heroic structures such as the giant woolsheds of western New South Wales. Of the book and its sequels Cox remarks that;

The book revealed that Australia's heritage in the most rude and fundamental buildings invited comparisons to the cathedrals of Europe. Robust yet elegant; simple in concept yet complex; humble yet daunting: spatially, these structures were to have a profound effect on architects searching for a genuinely Australian character. Here was Australia's very own Doric architecture. This publication was the first of a series of books investigating Australian vernacular traditions, all completed in collaboration with the photographer Wesley Stacey. The Australian Homestead explored the development of the traditional homestead type from earliest Georgian times to High Victorian architecture and beyond. The book demonstrated the consistency of the vernacular model and how it responded to 'High' style influences. Historic Towns of Australia looked at the development of urban form, the evolution of the girded [sic] town plan with its main street and responses to the environment at large. Other books included Building Norfolk Island, which documented the history and restoration of the Georgian settlement of Kingston, originally built as a penal colony incorporating the most elementary Georgian Palladian architecture. Restoring Old Australian Houses & Buildings, meanwhile, gave guidelines to preservation and restoration of Australian architecture.

The Australian Homestead (1972) in photographs and text documented diverse and significant colonial buildings and conveyed an overview of the rich heritage of Australia's nineteenth-century buildings. The National Library later acquired all of the photographs for the publication. Helen Ennis distinguished in Stacey's photographs;

...the quality of attention paid to the buildings and their sites, particularly in rural environments. He presents a range of viewpoints, contextualising the homesteads in tantalising long shots, using exterior and interior shots and providing wonderful close-ups of architectural details. Stacey takes particular pleasure in the forms of construction used see, for example, the photographs taken inside shearing sheds...

== The Road ==
Moving to live on the lower south coast of New South Wales, Stacey photographed for the government South Coast Advisory Committee on Woodchipping in public forests, and travelled throughout Australia photographing for publication and exhibition projects, including diaristic road trip series The Road for which he used the inexpensive point-and-shoot 110 format Kodak Instamatic newly introduced to Australia's amateur market in 1973. Exhibited at the Australian Centre for Photography in 1975, the installation comprised seventeen horizontal strips of snapshot-sized machine-printed Kodacolour prints; two-hundred and eighty images shot one-handed from the driver's seat of Stacey's Kombi van on trips criss-crossing Australia between 1973 and 1975 and joined like a film-strip into long horizontal sequences, organised chronologically or in themes. John Szarkowski, curator of photography at the Museum of Modern Art in New York then visiting to advise on the establishment of The Australian Centre for Photography regarded Stacey's work as "the most radical thing he had seen" in Australia, and it was declared a landmark work by both the Art Gallery of New South Wales curator of photography Gael Newton and by David Moore. It paralleled the contemporaneous conceptual works of Robert Rooney in Melbourne.

== Indigenous activism through photography ==
Stacey also worked with Guboo Ted Thomas and the Australian Institute of Aboriginal Studies documenting First Nations' heritage sites and came to embrace the indigenous cause. The 1970s were a decade in which photographic departments started to be established in public galleries in the eastern states of Australia, and simultaneously some documentary photographers became engaged in cross-cultural relationships with Aborigines who were politically aware in issues of self-determination, which challenged governments' paternalistic control of health, legal, housing, and other fundamental services; and land rights, as unlike in New Zealand no treaty existed between the first white settlers and the First Nations. That movement in 1972 mounted the Aboriginal Tent Embassy on the lawns of Parliament House, Canberra, amongst regular land rights marches which newspaper and freelance photojournalists documented with the assent of Aboriginal leaders who knew the value of good images to their cause.

Amidst vociferous land rights protests at the Brisbane Commonwealth Games, representing this groundswell of change was After the Tent Embassy: Images of Aboriginal History In Black and White Photographs at the Bondi Pavilion. Narelle Perroux and Stacey selected 114 photographs by twenty-nine photographers, juxtaposing copies from libraries and government agencies of Victorian-era anthropological photographs and early twentieth-century mission photographs, against images of contemporary First Nations' life, and their protests, from newspaper reports and from non-Indigenous photographers such as Michael Gallagher, the English photojournalist Penny Tweedie (concurrently showing at the ACP), and the activist photographer Juno Gemes (whose solo exhibition was then being shown at the Hogarth Galleries). The exhibition toured, first to Canberra's Woden Shopping Centre, then during National Aborigines Day Observance Committee (NADOC) Week at the Australian Institute of Aboriginal and Torres Strait Islander Studies which archives the imagery.

The following year, the aboriginal activist Marcia Langton edited a book of the exhibition, captioning it with what Palmer and Jolly call "a passionate text that ran in short staccato bites beneath the photographs," that, as Catherine De Lorenzo notes "was designed to leave no viewer wondering about the point of the exhibition." Only one of the photographers involved with the project, Langton, was Indigenous, which Catherine De Lorenzo considers "is as much a reflection of unequal access to education and resources as it is evidence of strong commitment by sectors of the settler population toward a more equitable society;" Tweedie, Gemes, Jon Rhodes, and many others, with Stacey, were "forging a new visual poetics within activist politics."

== Late career ==
From 1993 Stacey continued to live on the far south east coast and took up use of a panoramic camera for monochrome and colour landscapes and skyscapes in Australia, Italy, Japan, Korea, Brittany and England.

Wesley Stacey died at home on the New South Wales South Coast on 9 February 2023.

== Awards ==
- 1981: Australia Council Grant to continue photographing on the South Coast
- 1993: Awarded Australian Artists Creative Fellowship by the Federal Government

== Collections ==
- National Gallery of Australia, Canberra
- National Portrait Gallery, Canberra
- Albury Regional Art Gallery
- Art Gallery of New South Wales, Sydney
- Australian Institute of Aboriginal and Torres Strait Islander Studies, Canberra
- Australian National Library, Canberra
- National Gallery of Victoria, Melbourne

== Exhibitions ==
=== Solo ===
- 1964 Photographic Expression, University of New South Wales, Sydney
- 1965 Australian Vernacular Architecture, Royal Institute of British Architects, London
- 1973 Towards A Self Portrait, Brummels Gallery, Melbourne
- 1975 The Edge, National Gallery of Victoria, Melbourne and Coventry Gallery, Sydney
- 1975 The Road, Australian Centre for Photography, Sydney
- 1990 Signing The Land, Canberra School of Art, Canberra
- 1991 The Photographs of Wesley Stacey, National Gallery of Australia, Canberra
- 1993 to the bright plain, Christine Abrahams Gallery, Melbourne
- 1994 Landscapes for Peace: Kiyomizu Temple, Kyoto, Japan
- 1995 Landscapes for Peace:Shinsegae Dongbang Gallery, Seoul, Korea
- 1996 Landscapes for Peace: Christine Abrahams Gallery, Melbourne

=== Group ===
- 1967 The Australian Nude, Gallery A, Sydney and Melbourne
- 1972 Kings Cross, The Yellow House, Sydney and Gallery A, Melbourne / Friends, Brummels Gallery, Melbourne
- 1974-9 Recent Australian Photography, Asian Tour
- 1979 The Law Comes From The Mountain, Aboriginal travelling exhibition
- 1980 Australian Photographic Industry Collection, Festival of Sydney
- 1981 Sydney Focus I Melbourne Shift, Victorian College of the Arts
- 1981 The Developed Image Gallery, Adelaide
- 1981 Mumbulla-Spiritual-Contact, Australian National Library, Canberra and Parliament House and The Australian Museum, Sydney
- 1981 Land Marks, Victorian College of the Arts, Melbourne
- 1981 Eureka!, Australian Artists, Serpentine Gallery, London
- 1981 New Colour Photography, Australian Centre for Photography, Sydney
- 1982 Australian Wilderness, University of NSW, Sydney
- 1982 After The Tent Embassy, travelling exhibition
- 1983 Australian Perspecta, Art Gallery of NSW, Sydney
- 1983 From Another Continent - The Dream and the Real, Paris, France
- 1983 Recent Colour Photography, National Gallery of Australia, Canberra
- 1983 Decade of Australian Photography, Australian Centre for Photography, Sydney
- 1983 Old Continent - New Building, travelling Europe and America
- 1985 CSR Photography Project, Queensland Art Gallery, Brisbane
- 1987 Photography in the 1970s, National Gallery of Australia, Canberra
- 1988 Images And Objects, Aeroporto di Roma, Italy
- 1988 Shades Of Light, National Gallery of Australia, Canberra
- 1993 Critic's Choice, Art Gallery of New South Wales, Sydney
- 1995 On The Edge, Australian Photographers, San Diego Museum of Art, USA
- 1997 Site and Sensibility, Artbank selection, S.H. Ervine Gallery, Sydney
- 1997 Practically Art, Mary Place Gallery, Sydney
- 1998 Cars and Cultures, Powerhouse Museum, Sydney
- 1999 What is this thing called photography?, Art Gallery of NSW, Sydney
- 2000 Selected Panoramics, Australian Photographic Society Conference, Canberra

== Co-Authored Publications ==
- Cox, Philip (1980). Rude timber buildings in Australia. Wesley Stacey, J. M. Freeland. London: Angus & Robertson. ISBN 0-207-14149-5. OCLC 27497498.
- Cox, Philip Sutton (1971). Building Norfolk Island. Wesley Stacey. Melbourne: Thomas Nelson (Australia). ISBN 0-17-001954-3. OCLC 235931.
- Ellis, Rennie (1971). Kings Cross Sydney; a personal look at the Cross. Wesley Stacey. [Melbourne]: [Thomas] Nelson [(Australia)]. ISBN 0-17-001964-0. OCLC 287100.
- Cox, Philip Sutton (1972). The Australian homestead. Wesley Stacey. Melbourne: Lansdowne. ISBN 0-7018-0406-8. OCLC 667521.
- Cox, Philip Sutton (1973). Historic towns of Australia. Wesley Stacey. Melbourne: Lansdowne. ISBN 0-7018-0184-0. OCLC 1103484.
- The Artist craftsman in Australia, aspects of sensibility. Wesley Stacey, Fay Bottrell. Crows Nest, N.S.W.: Jack Pollard. 1972. ISBN 0-909950-24-5. OCLC 707855.
- Stacey, Wesley (1975). Country towns. John, active Ross. South Melbourne, Vic.: Macmillan. ISBN 0-333-17568-9. OCLC 2508597.
- Williams, Eleanor Mary (1977). Timeless gardens. Wesley Stacey. Lilydale, Vic.: Pioneer Design Studio. ISBN 0-909674-07-8. OCLC 4641262.
- Williams, Max (1977). Baronda. Wesley Stacey. Bermagui South, N.S.W.: Williams/Stacey. ISBN 0-9596511-0-1. OCLC 5027488.
- Cox, Philip Sutton (1978). Australian colonial architecture. Clive Lucas. Melbourne: Lansdowne Editions. ISBN 0-7018-0404-1. OCLC 6195670.
- National Library of Australia; Thomas, Guboo Ted; Stacey, Wesley (1981). Mumbulla - spiritual contact : photographic show from the South Coast Aborigines. Canberra: National Library of Australia.
- Langton, Marcia (1983). After the tent embassy : images of Aboriginal history in black and white photographs. [Place of publication not identified]: Valadon Pub. ISBN 0-9594202-3-1. OCLC 11091119.
