= Mervyn Bishop =

Australian news and documentary photographer

- Born: July 1945 (age 81); Brewarrina, New South Wales, Australia
- Known for: Photography
- Notable work: Life and Death Dash (1971)
- Awards: Nikon-Walkley Australian Press Photographer of the Year (1971), Red Ochre Award (2000)

Mervyn Bishop (born July 1945) is an Indigenous Australian news and documentary photographer. Joining the Sydney Morning Herald as a cadet in 1963, he was the first Aboriginal Australian to work on a metropolitan daily newspaper and one of the first to become a professional photographer. In 1971, four years after completing his cadetship, he was named Australian Press Photographer of the Year. He has continued to work as a photographer and lecturer.

== Early life and education ==
Mervyn Bishop, a Murri man, was born in July 1945 in Brewarrina in north-west New South Wales. His father, "Minty" Bishop, had been a soldier and shearer, and was himself born to an Aboriginal mother and a Punjabi Indian father. In 1950, "Minty" gained an "official exemption certificate which permitted 'more advanced' Aborigines to live apart from mission blackfellas in post-war Australia". This enabled the family to live among "ordinary" people in Brewarrina. The catch to this certificate was that the exempt Aboriginal people were expected to "sever their ties with their old culture". or 1963, Bishop is a Kamilaroi man.

By high school he had started "chronicling the family with a camera – first his mother's Kodak 620, and then a 35mm Japanese camera he bought for £15". He moved to Dubbo when he was 14 to finish his high school at Dubbo High School.

He returned to study later, receiving an Associate Diploma in Adult Education at Sydney College of Advanced Education in 1989.

== Career ==
Bishop began his career as a cadet photographer with the Sydney Morning Herald in 1963, the first Aboriginal photographer hired by the paper, becoming the first Aboriginal person to work on a metropolitan daily newspaper and one of the first to become a professional photographer. During four years of his cadetship, he completed a Photography Certificate Course at Sydney Technical College. In 2004, he remained the only indigenous photographer to have been employed by the paper.

He won the Nikon-Walkley Australian Press Photographer of the Year in 1971 with Life and Death Dash (1971), a photograph which appeared on the front page of the Sydney Morning Herald in January 1971, depicting a nun rushing to get help for an Aboriginal child. Artist Jonathan Jones wrote in 2014: "In this startling image, composition, contrast and Aboriginal social commentary combine. It is a classic example of photojournalism that has since transgressed its original context and come to insinuate the impact of religious missions within Aboriginal Australia and, in particular, on the Stolen Generations".

From 1974 to 1980, he worked as the Department of Aboriginal Affairs staff photographer. Some of his most enduring work came from this period, as he visited Indigenous communities and documented "the first flush of an idealistic era when land rights, equal wages and government-funded aid seemed to presage a new dawn for Aboriginal Australians".

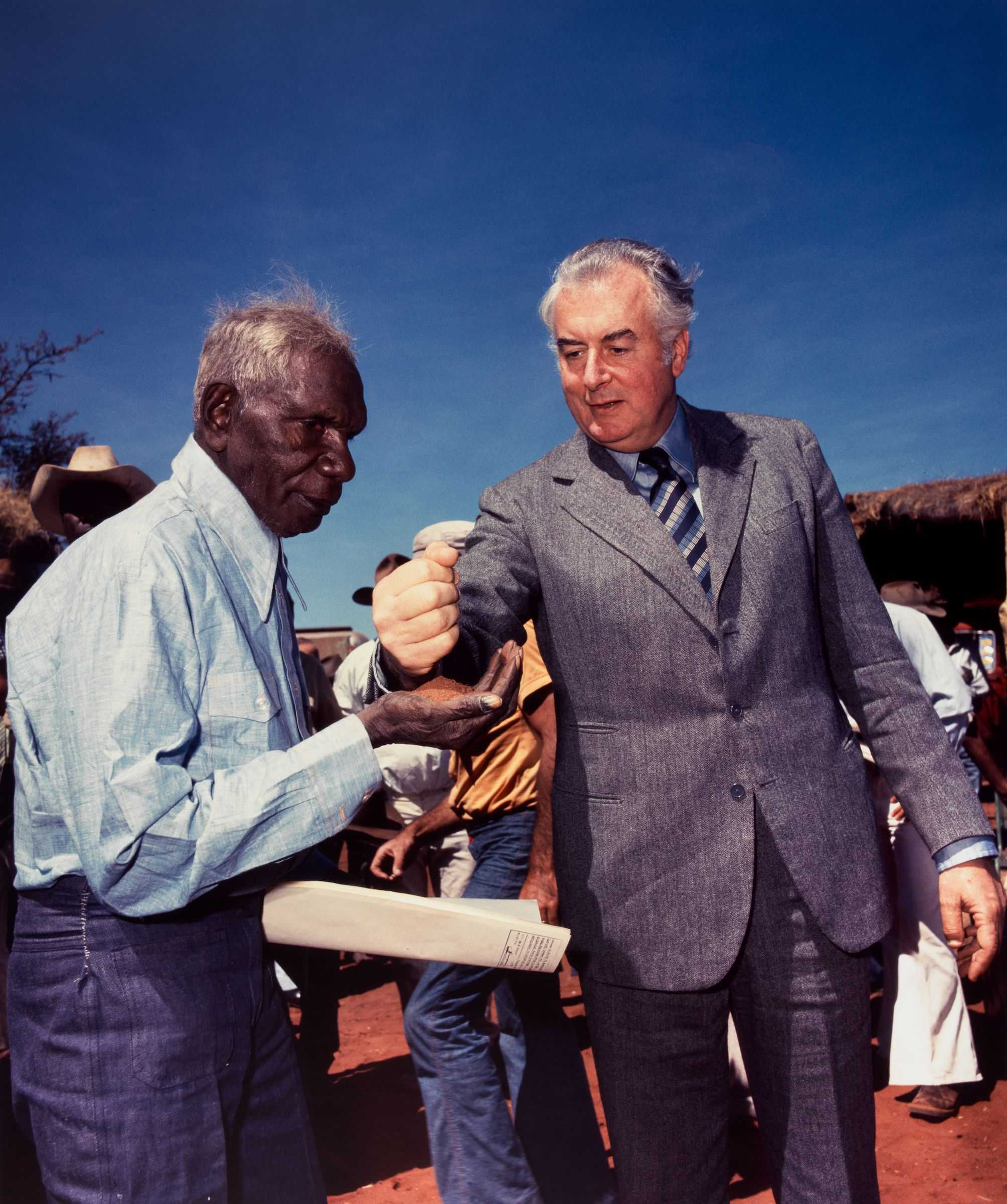
Bishop's photograph of Whitlam pouring soil into Lingiari's hand.

It was during this time, in 1975, that he shot the iconic photograph of Gough Whitlam pouring soil into the hand of Gurindji traditional owner Vincent Lingiari, at the handover of the deeds to Gurindji country at Wattie Creek. This photograph has been seen as capturing "the symbolic birth of landrights".

He returned to the Sydney Morning Herald in 1979, before becoming a freelance photographer in 1986, working for such agencies as the National Geographic Society.

Bishop completed further studies and lectured in photography at Tranby Aboriginal College, the Eora College, and at the Tin Sheds Gallery at the University of Sydney.

In 1991 he had his first solo exhibition, In Dreams: Mervyn, Thirty Years of Photography 1960 to 1990, at the Australian Centre for Photography. Originally curated by Tracey Moffatt, it went on to tour for over 10 years. A book titled In Dreams was published to accompany the exhibition.

He worked as a stills photographer on Phillip Noyce's 2002 drama film Rabbit-Proof Fence.

He produced a one-man performance piece, Flash Blak, in the vein of a William Yang slide show to music and written and directed by Yang, for the 2004 Message Sticks Festival at the Sydney Opera House. His aim in the show was to delve "into his family's history to illuminate a wider story about Aboriginal life in the latter half of the 20th century".

== Recognition and awards ==
In 2013, Bishop was featured in an episode in the 2013 documentary television series Desperate Measures, titled "Through the Eyes of Lens with Merv Bishop".

A photographic portrait of Bishop hangs in the Art Gallery of New South Wales, created by Greg Lee.

A black and white photograph of Bishop, using a mirror taken by Dean Saffron was selected as a finalist in the 2026 National Photographic Portrait Prize .

Bishop was the recipient of the following awards:

- 1971: Nikon-Walkley Australian Press Photographer of the Year, for Life and Death Dash
- 2000: Red Ochre Award, worth A$50,000, from the Australia Council's Aboriginal and Torres Strait Islander Arts Board, "in recognition of his pioneering work and ongoing influence"

== Personal life ==
Bishop's wife, Elizabeth, died of cancer in 1991, and he was left to care for their teenage son, Tim, and six-year-old daughter, Rosemary.

== Collections and exhibitions ==
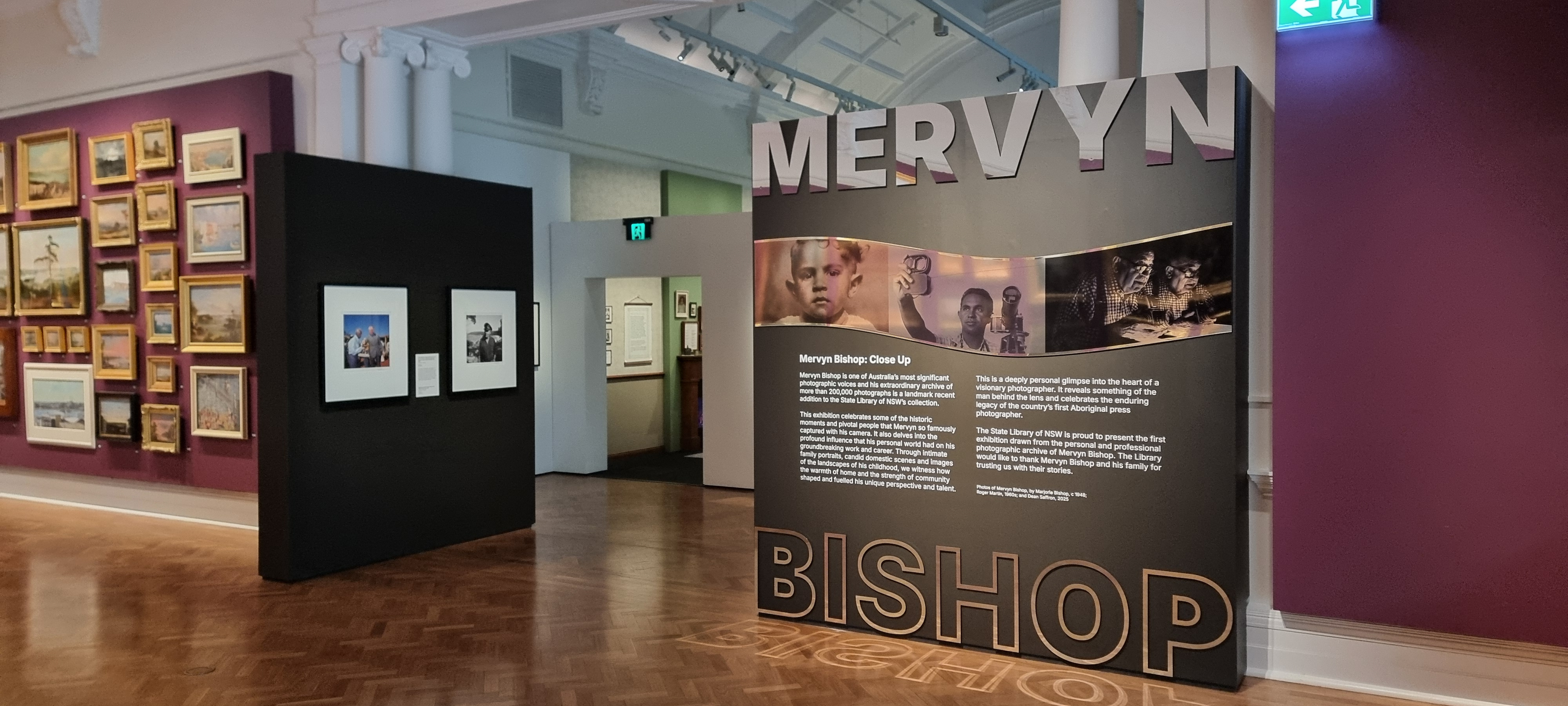
Meryn Bishop exhibition at the State Library of NSW.

A number of Bishop's photographs are held in the permanent collection of the Art Gallery of New South Wales (AGNSW), the National Gallery of Australia, and the National Portrait Gallery.

In 2010, Bishop's work was included in Candid Camera: Australian Photography 1950s–1970s at the Art Gallery of South Australia, a group retrospective of social documentary photography which also featured the work of key Australian photographers Max Dupain, David Moore, Jeff Carter, Robert McFarlane, Rennie Ellis, Carol Jerrems and Roger Scott.

Mervyn Bishop: The Exhibition was mounted by the National Film & Sound Archive of Australia from 5 March to 1 August 2021, drawn from the Art Gallery of New South Wales (AGNSW) collection, the artist's private archive, and enriched by sound and moving image from the NFSA.

Solo and group exhibitions include:

- 1991–2001: In Dreams: Mervyn Bishop Thirty Years of Photography 1960–1990, initially curated by Tracey Moffatt, at the Australian Centre for Photography in Sydney and touring for around 10 years
- 1991, Images of Black Sport, Powerhouse Museum, Sydney
- 1991, Her Story: Images of Domestic Labour in Australian Art, S.H. Ervin Gallery, Sydney
- 1991, Fine and mostly sunny: photographs from the collection, Art Gallery of New South Wales, Sydney
- 1992, Cultural exchange with the Chinese Photographic Society and Australia's Department of Foreign Affairs and Trade
- 1992, Recent Acquisitions – Australian Photography, AGNSW
- 1993, Aratjara: Art of the First Australians, Touring: Kunstsammlung Nordrhein-Westfalen, Düsseldorf; Hayward Gallery, London; Louisiana Museum of Modern Art, Humlebaek
- 1993, Urban Focus: Aboriginal and Torres Strait Islander Art from the Urban Areas of Australia, National Gallery of Australia, Canberra
- 1993, Photographs from the collection, AGNSW
- 1994, Critic's choice, AGNSW
- 1994, We Are Family, AGNSW
- 1996, From the Street – Photographs From the Collection, AGNSW
- 1997, Discipline and beauty, Art Gallery of New South Wales
- 1998, Retake: Contemporary Aboriginal and Torres Strait Islander Photography, National Gallery of Australia
- 2000, Another country, Art Gallery of New South Wales
- 2001, A Dubbo Day with Jimmy and other reconciliation images, Stills Gallery, Paddington
- 2003, New View: Indigenous Photographic Perspectives, Monash Gallery
- 2003, On the Beach: with Whiteley and fellow Australian artists, Brett Whiteley Studio, Surry Hills
- 2004, Australian postwar photodocumentary, AGNSW
- 2008, Half Light: Portraits from Black Australia, Art Gallery of New South Wales
- 2010, Candid Camera: Australian Photography 1950s–1970s, Art Gallery of South Australia, Adelaide
- 2011, What's in a face? aspects of portrait photography, AGNSW
- 2012, Home: Aboriginal Art from NSW, AGNSW
- 2015, The photograph and Australia, Art Gallery of New South Wales
- 2017, Mervyn Bishop (24 June – 8 October), a major retrospective at AGNSW and touring
- 2019, Artist talk and exhibition (7 May – 22 June), Bank Art Museum Moree, New South Wales.
- 2021, Mervyn Bishop: The Exhibition by the National Film and Sound Archive of Australia, drawn from the Art Gallery of New South Wales collection, the artist's private archive, and enriched by sound and moving image from the NFSA
