= Adam Pretty =

Australian sports photographer

Adam Pretty (born abt 1977) is a professional sports photographer from Sydney, Australia. He has worked as a press photographer and freelance photographer. He photographed the 2000, 2004, 2012, 2016, 2020, and 2024 Olympics. He has won numerous awards, including top awards for World Press Photo.

== Biography ==
Pretty grew up in the eastern suburbs of Sydney and attended Sydney Boys High School where his interest in photography began, and he developed his initial skills in using a camera. At school, Pretty was a coxswain in the rowing team.

After school Pretty worked as a freelance photographer and began his career by finally landing his first job with the Sydney Morning Herald in 1997. In his first year as a cadet photographer, Pretty won second prize in the colour single picture category of the International Olympic Committee Best of Sport photographic competition.

His desire to specialise in sport led to him joining Allsport (now Getty Images) in 1998, where he is still working. Pretty was one of the key photographers for Getty Images during the 2000 Summer Olympics in Sydney, the 2002 Winter Olympics in Salt Lake City, 2004 Summer Olympics in Athens and the 2012 Olympic Games in London. He also photographed the 2024 Paris Olympics for Getty.

== Awards ==
- World Press Photo - Sports Portfolio (Note: "World Press Photo archive".)
  - 1st Place Sports Stories/Portfolio 1999
  - 2nd Place Sports Stories Action stories 2003
  - 1st Place Sports Stories/Portfolio 2004
  - 2nd Place Sports Stories/Portfolio 2005
  - 2nd Place Sports Action/Portfolio 2006
  - 1st Place Sports Stories/Portfolio 2011
  - 2nd Place Sports Stories/Portfolio 2012.
  - 1st Place Sports 2021
- SSF World Sports Photo Contest: Special Photographers Award
- Pictures of the Year International - Sports Portfolio
  - 1st Place Sports Portfolio 1998
  - 1st Place Sports Portfolio 1999
  - 1st Place Sports Portfolio 2000
- Walkley Award
  - 1st Place News Photograph 1998
  - 1st Place Sports Photography 2003
  - 1st Place Photo Essay 2004
  - Press Photographer of the year 2004
- IOC Best of Sport: 1997 Silver Lens.
- 2012 Canon AIPP Australian Professional Photographer of the Year
