= Kate Geraghty =

Australian photographer (born 1972)

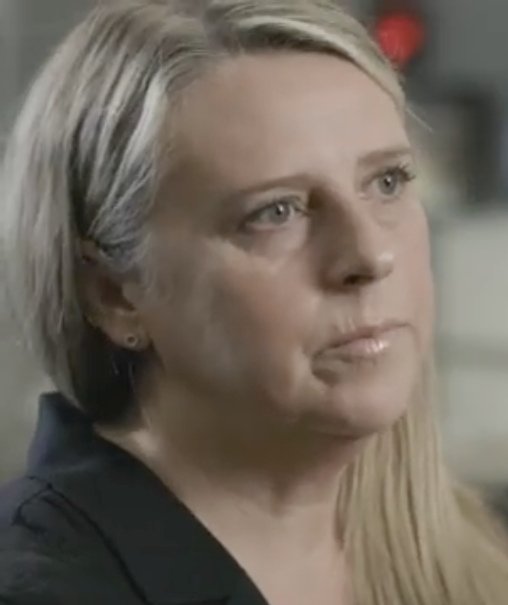
- In a Lowy Institute video in 2019
- Born: 1972 (age 53–54)
- Occupation: Photojournalist
- Awards: Walkley Press Photographer of the Year (2006, 2007); Media Peace Award (2009)

Kate Geraghty (born 1972) is an Australian war photographer, and photojournalist for The Sydney Morning Herald, and The Age and five time Walkley winner.

== Career ==
Geraghty started photographing professionally at Albury-Wodonga's The Border Mail in 1997, and photographing sport was formative; on one occasion she counted twenty-seven of her own pictures in one Monday-morning edition, a large number of them pictures of local sporting competitions that typically required her on any Saturday to cover "half a quarter of an AFL match, driving 100 kilometres to make the second half of a hockey match ... you'd cover at least seven games in the one day." When the newspaper refused to send her to East Timor to record the 1999 crisis, she took her holiday there to take photographs that were then published.

Geraghty then freelanced in Cambodia and Australia, photographing the 2000 Summer Olympics. In 2001 she joined The Sydney Morning Herald, where her first assignment was to cover the 2002 Bali bombings, describing it as "‘one of the most shocking things I’ve ever seen." In 2003, Geraghty was the first Fairfax woman photographer to cover a war when Mike Bowers, her picture editor, assigned her to photograph the invasion of Iraq in 2003, and was astonished when senior management told him that he would be held accountable if anything happened to Geraghty, who is quoted as responding; "War has been a guy's game for decades and decades". Bowers remembers that "It astounded me. I've got no idea; I can only assume it was because they were afraid of her being raped. I think they probably thought she would attract further attention to the male journalists who were going with her. I don't know."

Since then, she has provided reportage of the arrest in Jakarta of Amrozi bin Nurhasyim and Samudra, the 2009 Jakarta bombings, the aftereffects of the 2004 tsunami in Aceh, Indonesia, Van Tuong Nguyen's execution in Singapore, and the war in Lebanon.

== Approach ==
Geraghty was with the Albury Border-Mail when in 1999–2000 Kosovo refugees were held at nearby Bandiana barracks then controversially sent back by the Australian federal government. It was the first time she had been assigned to deal "with people who had suffered and who had fled war", learning "how to build trust [with them by] spend[ing] time ... [and] explain[ing] where you're coming from".

Geraghty negotiated with Hamas for two years to obtain access to their leader Khalid Mishal in 2013. She says that "It's a privilege to meet people and for them to trust us enough to tell us their story. Whether it's a pro-Russian rebel or a boy who's been shot by Islamic State, each one of them has to be given the respect to tell their story."

Geraghty reports that she shoots with both eyes open; "Well, physically I do. So I don't just see what's in the frame. I can hear I it. I can smell it."

Covering war, she says, has changed her, and she has had to circumnavigate resistance of military officialdom, and even from the Australian Defence Force, to do it. When in 2013, she travelled to Uruzgan to interview the Afghanis and Matiullah Khan, the provincial chief of police the ADF attempted to "derail" the assignment, as Geraghty explains;

The ADF/Australian government attempted to block us from reporting or staying in Uruzgan until Matiullah Khan stated we would be his guests...Although we had Afghan journo visas, the ADF at Tarin Kowt airbase would not let us proceed off the base from our commercial flight. It took several hours until Khan intervened.

Reflecting on whether images of those killed in conflict should be published, Geraghty says,

I think it's a day-to-day ethical question that the editors discuss. It depends on how graphic it is. I've never been told not to photograph a dead individual. But, you know, this is war. What the hell do they expect? I don't know if they should be shown but I don't think that we should criticise photographers for taking them. And is it only unethical or upsetting because they're Australian? Look at Haiti, the earthquake; a cascade of dead bodies. It's hypocritical to decide that just because they're Australian, they deserve more dignity than someone from Africa or Afghanistan.

Since its introduction, Geraghty has embraced the multimedia platforms now used by her newspaper as a vehicle in which she has "complete control of the story being told", being able, alongside a trusted journalist, to edit and provide audio and visuals unencumbered.

== Recognition ==
Mike Bowers says of Kate Geraghty that "no one holds a candle to her," and rates her with Penny Bradfield and Tamara Dean. Geraghty documented the arrival of asylum seekers on Manus Island in Papua New Guinea. There, she shot Asylum, a photograph that was the finalist for the News Photography Category in the Walkley Awards in which she had already twice taken Press Photographer of the Year, and has since been honoured with the 2009 United Nations Association of Australia Media Peace award. Her work has been shown at the King Street Gallery.

== Gaza flotilla ==
During the 2010 Gaza flotilla raid, she was on board the MV Samoud, with Paul McGeough. She reports being Tasered by the Israelis. The Israeli attack was:

pretty full on....Three of the soldiers on the deck were Australian-Israelis,.... I couldn't believe it. It hurt and it made me feel sick.

She photographed the Turkish ferry Mavi Marmara being boarded by Israeli forces and the Challenger One had attempted to outrun the Israeli zodiacs to give her time to transmit her photographs. Australian consular officials met them in Ela prison.

== Awards ==
- 2006 Nikon Walkley Press Photographer of the Year
- 2007 Nikon Walkley Press Photographer of the Year
- 2009 United Nations Association of Australia Media Peace award for photojournalism
- 2009 Press Photographer of the Year finalist
