= Dean Sewell (photographer) =

Australian documentary photographer

Dean Sewell (b 1972) is an Australian documentary photographer. He has won a number of awards. He lives in Sydney.

== Life and work ==
Sewell grew up in Sydney and started his career as a news photographer for The Sydney Morning Herald.

His first major award was in 1994 when he received the Nikon-Walkley Australian Press Photographer of the Year.

Based in Moscow in 1996 and 1997, Sewell covered the First Chechen War and Russian Federal Elections as well as documenting social issues in the Post-Soviet states.

Sewell's series on The Block, an Aboriginal community in Redfern, an inner suburb of Sydney, was showcased at the Visa pour l'image festival of photojournalism in Perpignan, France.

In 2001, Sewell was a co-founder of the Australian documentary photography collective Oculi.

In 2004, Sewell flew to Aceh just after the 2004 Indian Ocean earthquake and tsunami and photographed the aftermath. His work won a World Press Photo award.

== Awards ==
- 1994 – Nikon-Walkley Australian Press Photographer of the Year
- 1998 – Nikon-Walkley Australian Press Photographer of the Year
- 2000 – World Press Photo Award – 2nd Place – People in the News category – East Timor independence
- 2001 – Leica/Centre for Contemporary Photography (CCP) Documentary Photography Award – Highly commended 'Cave Clan'
- 2002 – World Press Photo Award (3rd Place) – Nature and the Environment category – Australian bushfires
- 2003 – Finalist – Energex Arbour Contemporary Art Prize
- 2003 – Finalist – Agfa, Das BildForum 7th International Prize for Young Photojournalists
- 2004 – Finalist, Josephine Ulrick National Photography Prize – 'Lara'
- 2005 – World Press Photo Award – Spot News Stories – Aceh Tsunami aftermath
- 2006 – Winner, Australia's Top Photographers, Photojournalism
- 2007 – Finalist, Head On portrait prize, Australian Centre for Photography
- 2009 – Finalist, National Photographic Portrait Prize – 'Common Ground'
- 2009 – Moran Contemporary Photography Prize – 'A Dry Argument' Murray Darling Basin
