= Gareth Powell =

Welsh-born Australian author (1934–2016)

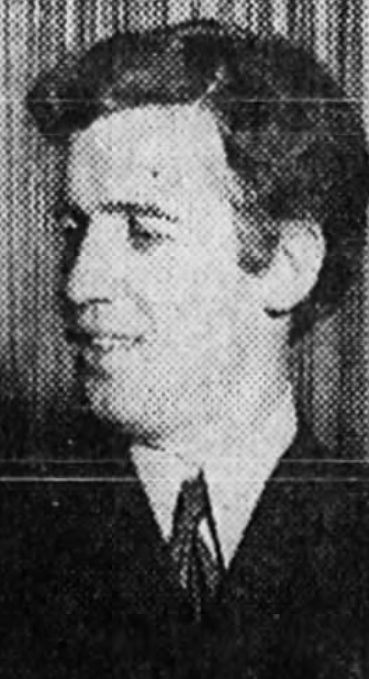
- Born: 26 May 1934; Caerwys, Flintshire, Wales
- Died: 16 September 2016 (aged 82); Darlinghurst, NSW, Australia
- Occupations: Publisher, journalist, author, editor
- Spouse(s): Jenny; previous wives: Brenda; Josephine
- Children: 5, Sian, David, Tom, Ben, Roo

Gareth Powell (26 May 1934 – 16 September 2016) was a Welsh-born Australian publisher, journalist, author, and editor.

During the 1960s, Powell was managing director of two London publishing houses, Mayflower Books and then the New English Library, and achieved a measure of notoriety for publishing Fanny Hill for the former and The Carpetbaggers for the latter. In 1967 he and his family emigrated to Australia. There he published magazines (including men's magazine Chance International and women's magazine POL) and books (including bestseller Now You'll Think I'm Awful), introducing new standards of production quality to the Australian market.

After problems with the importation of Chance — an issue was barred by Australian Customs on the grounds of obscenity and upheld by court order — Powell moved his business to Hong Kong where his magazines were printed. He continued, however, to write and publish books, copy, and magazines for Australian and international personal computing and travel markets. During the 1980s and 1990s he also wrote columns for the Sydney Morning Herald, becoming their computer/technology editor and later travel editor and supplements editor. He left the Herald after a September 1994 Media Watch episode identified allegedly plagiarised material under his byline, insertions which, according to Powell, had been made by a junior colleague while he was on leave.

After leaving the Herald, he continued to write books on personal computing, motoring and travel, as well as columns for a range of old and new media.

== Biography ==
=== Early life and career ===
Gareth Powell was born in Caerwys, North Wales on 26 May 1934. He was the seventh child of Calvinist Methodists Thomas Norman Powell, an Inspector of Schools, and his wife Blodwyn (née Hughes). When Powell was two, his family moved to Pontypridd, and then when nine to Wallasey. He was expelled from school at the age of 15.

On turning 17, he joined the British Army as a regular soldier, where he served in the field security stream of the Intelligence Corps for two years and a half years, including in Malaya, and attaining the rank of sergeant. After discharge, he worked in various jobs including as a truck driver and circus hand, before joining local paper Wallasey and Wirral Chronicle in 1955.

=== London publishing ===
Powell moved to London, where he worked for two years on a weekly trade magazine. By 1960 he had worked as an editor for Four Square Books. He subsequently worked for paperback publisher Panther Books, before becoming a founding member of Mayflower Books.

==== Mayflower Books ====
Mayflower Books launched in 1961 under American publishers Feffer & Simons, Inc., with Powell as managing director. It published a mix of original and reprinted works, with its opening slate being William Saroyan's Rock Wagram, Richard Gehman's Sinatra and His Rat Pack, a Dixon of Dock Green novel, and Something Fresh by Wodehouse. Mayflower also published paperback editions of science fiction works, starting with Player Piano by Kurt Vonnegut, as well as approximately two film tie-ins each month.

During the production of the fourth issue of satirical magazine Private Eye from late 1961 to early 1962, Powell provided the creative team with a free room in Mayflower's Covent Garden warehouse (later the site of The Roxy nightclub). According to Powell, he was gifted a 5% share of the magazine in recompense, but sold it shortly afterward to Peter Cook, who took over the magazine in June 1962.

By late 1962, Mayflower's biggest success was the UK paperback edition of Richard Gehman's Sinatra and His Rat Pack, with 300,000 copies sold. Even so, the firm did not have the resources to buy the rights to any major title, in particular the UK rights for The Carpetbaggers, by Harold Robbins.

Mayflower was sold to Dell Publishing in 1963, with Powell and Lionel V. Fennelly becoming joint managing directors. Powell handled editorial and promotional responsibilities, and Fennelly handled administrative, commercial and sales responsibilities.

===== Fanny Hill =====
In November 1963, Mayflower published an unexpurgated paperback edition of the original 1748–49 version of John Cleland's erotic novel Fanny Hill. Police raided G. Gold & Son's Magic Shop in London, seized 171 copies, and charged the retailers under Section 3 of the Obscene Publications Act of 1959, which allowed for trial without jury. Mayflower decided to cover Gold's legal costs, and asked that as publisher of the work they be charged under Section 2 of the Act, which as in the case of the 1960 trial for Lady Chatterley's Lover, would have required a jury trial. This request was denied on the grounds that "it would be less oppressive to the publishers" (although Powell states that he was also briefly arrested).

Despite supportive testimony of many expert witnesses, the recency of the Profumo affair, Gold's association with the "Soho smut market", and the book's low 3s 6d cover price all contributed to a guilty verdict after two minutes' consideration by magistrate Sir Robert Blundell. After liberals, the media, and the literary world protested, and an all-party motion in Parliament condemned the verdict, the Obscene Publications Act was altered to give publishers the right for a trial by jury. Mayflower issued a bowdlerized edition of the novel, as did other publishers. Although Mayflower offered to accept returns, only 250 of their 82,000 copy run were so returned.

==== New English Library ====
At the start of 1964, Powell moved from Mayflower to become managing director of the New English Library (NEL).

===== The Carpetbaggers =====
Powell soon scored a coup in securing the British paperback rights for bestselling novel The Carpetbaggers. He did this partly by offering author Harold Robbins, whose previous UK paperbacks had been published by Corgi, the massive advance of £32,000 when the standard payment of the time was approximately £4−5,000. The rights were acquired by NEL's Four Square imprint (which NEL had purchased during Powell's time at Mayflower). Most rivals thought that Powell and Four Square had erred.

Four Square published its British paperback edition of The Carpetbaggers in early 1964. Unlike the expurgated hardcover "Commonwealth Edition" published in London by Anthony Blond the previous year, NEL's version was unexpurgated; this was banned in South Africa in 1965, and threatened with being banned or restricted in New Zealand, the unexpurgated work having already been banned in Australia since 1961. Paradoxically, those bans had the effect of raising public awareness of the book and ultimately contributed to increased sales when the bans were ended.

Powell had a taste for flamboyant promotion of the books he published. As part of his publicity campaign, he brought Robbins to London in early February 1964. The author, too, believed in the role of promotion in making a book a bestseller. Peter Haining, then an editorial director at NEL, recalled that Robbins "pressed the flesh, and he was very good at it... He realized that publicity was the thing, and he worked hard to create an impression". The novel was promoted as a fictionalised version of the life of eccentric entrepreneur Howard Hughes. The book's bright red covers were decorated with sexy illustrations on both front and back, a banner on the front proclaiming "Over 5,000,000 copies sold", and the back cover trumpeting "The Carpetbaggers is the bestseller all America is reading and talking about". By March 1965 The Carpetbaggers was at number three on the British best-seller list.

===== Departure from NEL =====
The New English Library's only profitable year was 1964, when The Carpetbaggers was published. Victor Weybright, co-founder of the parent New American Library (NAL), became critical of Powell, whom Weybright states had assured him "that he knew nothing of arithmetic", and who "talked more about his Rolls-Royce than about the business". Weybright continues that, on the night of the 1966 UK General Election, Powell:

...parked his Rolls-Royce conspicuously in front of Annabel's, the nightclub, which occurred to him as a splendid way to celebrate a socialist victory... – a young man in a Liberty-print shirt, with a Rolls-Royce, who had openly described himself as a lout, but with no company bank account except for deposits from New York and California to cover deficits and keep the enterprise alive. His notion of progress was to publish more and more Playboy trivia and Girodias pornography — with a bit of warmed up egghead stuff from NAL in the U.S.A.

Powell did not renew his contract in early 1967, and was succeeded as managing director by editorial director Christopher Shaw. NEL tried to "shake off the Powell image". It announced that it would cut output from around 50 titles a month to 36, and would further reduce that to 18 by early 1968. Irving Wardle, the English writer and theatre critic, noted in the New York Times Book Review:

If the [British publishing] boom is ending, one can date it to the departure for Australia this year of Gareth Powell. He paid huge advances on the assumption that it only needed spectacular salesmanship to achieve an even vaster readership. He largely supplied the salesmanship himself with the aid of a Rolls-Royce and a helicopter. And he stood for no nonsense about literature: Marketing books was no different from marketing a can of beans. Told by his American employer, "You're not in show business, Gareth," he replied. "Well, we bloody well ought to be." Powell was not a popular figure among the old-style bookmen, and terms ranging from "whizz-kid" to "lout" were freely bandied about in print (He was a working-class boy, which made it worse).

The Powell of this period provided partial inspiration along with John Lennon and John Bloom for the titular character in Hunter Davies's 1970 novel The Rise and Fall of Jake Sullivan, with all three having achieved "enormous success" from humble beginnings.

=== Early Australian-based publishing ===
==== Emigration ====
Powell had mentioned during a November 1966 visit to Australia that he was considering settling there because he liked "the idea of Australia's classless society", and elsewhere that he would leave the UK for either America or Australia because he "didn't like the atmosphere".

In 1967, he emigrated to Australia with his wife, their children, the Rolls-Royce and — not having been cleared by Britain to export more — only A$43 in capital ($613 in 2022). He had applied for assisted passage — "If I can get [it]... I'd be silly not to, wouldn't I?" — but this application was refused after direct intervention by Immigration Minister Billy Snedden, who stated "People of affluence are not entitled to an assisted passage". By the following year, Powell was driving a Holden.

==== Chance International and other girlie magazines ====
Powell's first Australian venture was Chance International, a girlie magazine which launched in 1967 with Jack de Lissa (who had founded earlier magazine Squire). A Sun-Herald reviewer found Chance a "glossy product... certainly full of meat, and on beautiful paper. A good book, for reading in the bath". Additionally, the magazine was noted as publishing "good, exciting new fiction", which "didn't have that orientation to particular traditions of the short story that the literary magazines seemed stuck to". Chance also published the work of some of Australia's best young photographers of the late 1960s and early 1970s, including Rennie Ellis, and was somewhat of a breakthrough in its high standards of printing quality, photography and design.

In a widely derided 1968 NSW Equity Court ruling in Chance International Pty. Ltd. v. Forbes, Justice Helsham, who was unsure what 8-page comic strip Barbarella was about but suspected lesbianism, decreed that the November 1968 issue of Chance was obscene and should be destroyed. Australian Censorship: The XYZ of Love noted that the judge "overlooked the fact that a few doors away from his court, a cinema was showing Barbarella which included some lines of dialogue he found particularly offensive in the strip".

At that time, Powell was publishing two other girlie magazines, Squire and Talent. Talent, which Powell described as "a colourful Man Junior", was printed in Milan and had been selling 42,000 copies throughout Europe. However Squire, co-published with Jack de Lissa, had also been having difficulties with Australian censorship boards. Powell stated that the Equity Court decision was causing him to have "second thoughts about the whole future of girlie magazines in Australia", and was considering whether he should either stop publishing Chance, or move its headquarters overseas.

==== POL magazine ====
In 1968, Powell launched women's magazine POL under editor Richard Walsh, a founding co-editor of underground magazine Oz. POL was both the first major Australian women's magazine to use colour offset printing, and the first to have its issues printed overseas; this was done by the Hong Kong branch of Dai Nippon Printing before issues were air-freighted to Australia. With POL, Powell became the first client of John Singleton's Public Relations firm SPASM.

==== Other magazines ====
At the end of 1967, Powell launched Surf International as an upmarket competitor to Surfing World. It was edited by John Witzig, and contained articles from Midget Farrelly, Bob McTavish, and Nat Young. Powell reported: "I tried to buy Surfing World but they asked too high a price for it, so I said I'll start my own". By September 1968 Surf International was said to be "selling 40,000 copies a month in Australia, Hawaii, the U.S., U.K., South Africa and Tahiti". The magazine ceased in 1969, however, with Witzig going on to co-found Tracks the following year.

In 1970 Powell launched Fathom, a diving magazine, which ran for 10 issues and closed in 1974.

==== Book publishing ====
In addition to magazines, Powell published books including Now You'll Think I'm Awful by Sue Rhodes ("a Helen Gurley Brown-ish tilt at Australian sex habits", which sold over 135,000 copies), investigative journalist Bob Bottom's first book Behind the Barrier (an "indictment" of Broken Hills Barrier Industrial Council), and Frank Moorhouse's first book, the 1969 Futility and Other Animals, which Moorhouse reports as never being distributed due to Gareth Powell Associates running into financial difficulties.

=== 1980s to 1990s ===
==== Computer magazines ====
In the 1980s Powell began publishing computer magazines, including Australian Apple Review (which launched in 1983 with Graeme Philipson as its first editor) and The Australian Commodore Review (which launched in 1984).

==== Broadsheet columnist ====
In the 1980s, Powell became a columnist for the Sydney Morning Herald. He worked as that newspaper's Computer Editor from January 1987, and also became its Travel Editor, and Supplements Editor.

In September 1994, the ABC's Media Watch television programme, under host Stuart Littlemore, aired an accusation that copy appearing under Powell's byline had been plagiarised. Powell maintained that this had been the result of actions performed by a junior colleague without his knowledge while he was overseas, however separated from the Herald. In the wake of the Media Watch story, the Usenet group aus.flame.gareth-powell was created.

=== Later work ===
During the 1990s and 2000s, Powell wrote a number of Australian travel, motoring and technology books including Independent Traveller's Australia guides for Thomas Cook, multiple editions of Australian Motoring Guide, and My Friend Arnold's Guide to Personal Computers.

From late 1996 until November 2004, Powell published and edited the magazine Australia's Internet Directory. From 2004, he launched a number of blogs on which he wrote on subjects including computing and the Internet, travel, photography, and classic bikes.

He also wrote for a variety of Australian and international periodicals including the Hong Kong Standard and the China Economic Review (for which he was also associate publisher), writing thousands of "Industry Updates" for the latter. In 2009 he joined Blorge, then a technology blog network, as an editor and author.

=== Personal life ===
Gareth Powell was married to his wife, Jenny, for 30 years. He was formerly married twice – to Brenda and to Josephine. He had five children – journalist Sian Powell, David Powell, Tom Powell, Ben Powell, and Roo Powell.

=== Death and legacy ===
Powell died on 16 September 2016 in Darlinghurst, New South Wales after unsuccessful treatment for spinal cancer.

Phil Sim of Media News acknowledged Powell's "pioneering roles in Australian magazine publishing and technology media". Computer Daily News editor David Frith has described Powell as "the best, wittiest and most perceptive commentator on the local IT scene from the mid 1960s".

In their book Australian Censorship: The XYZ of Love, James Hall and Sandra Hall hailed Powell as an "anti-censorship pioneer".

== Books published by Gareth Powell ==
=== Gareth Powell Associates, Sydney ===
- Sue Rhodes, Now You'll Think I'm Awful. 1967.
- Dita Cobb, Dahlings It's Delicious: [an uninhibited cook book]. 1967.
- Sue Rhodes, And When She was Bad She was Popular. 1968.
- Frank Moorhouse, Futility and Other Animals. 1969.
- Bob Bottom, Behind the Barrier. 1969.
- Arthur Acred, The Trotting Floyds. 1970.
- Tony Morphett, Dynasty. 1970.
- Abraham Thomi, The Dream and The Awakening. 1977.

=== Gareth Powell Limited, Hong Kong ===
- Arthur Hacker, Hacker's Hong Kong. 1976.
- Nicholas Culpeper, Culpeper's Complete Herbal & English Physician Wherein several hundred herbs, with a display of their medicinal and occult properties, are physically applied to the cure of all disorders incident to mankind; to which are added, rules for compounding medicines, and upwards of fifty choice receipts, selected from the author's last legacies; forming a complete family dispensary, and system of physic. 1979. Facsimile of Manchester edition of 1826.

== Forewords written by Gareth Powell ==
- Ivon A. Donnelly, Chinese Junks and Other Native Craft. Hong Kong: China Economic Review Publishing Ltd, 2008.
- Robert Coltman, Beleaguered in Peking. Hong Kong: China Economic Review Publishing Ltd, 2008; Hong Kong: Earnshaw Books, 2015.
