= Candid Camera (Australian photographic exhibition) =

Coordinates: 34.9206°S 138.6039°E

Candid Camera: Australian Photography 1950s–1970s was a group retrospective exhibition of social documentary photography held at the Art Gallery of South Australia from 28 May to 1 August 2010.

== Six photographers ==
Candid Camera had its roots in Six Photographers, a groundbreaking exhibition held in Sydney in May 1955, which concentrated on what was still a relatively new development in Australian photography and featured the work of Max Dupain, David Potts, Axel Poignant, Gordon Andrews, Kerry Dundas and Hal Missingham. The work of the first three of these was also represented in Candid Camera. Six Photographers, an artist-initiated show that showed 200 images at a time when exhibitions of personal photographic work were rare, was regarded as sufficiently influential for the Art Gallery of New South Wales to commemorate it with a show of the same title featuring the same six photographers, more than 50 years after it had first been presented. This second version of Six Photographers featured 29 images, many of them shown in 1955, and concentrated on works from the same period (the late forties through to the mid-fifties).

Candid Camera, while about half the size of the 1955 Sydney exhibition, covered a significantly wider range of artists and looked not just at the foundations of Australian social documentary photography but at the era that curator Julie Robinson clearly regards as its golden age – the fifties, sixties and seventies.

In line with the statements issued by the six photographers group, Candid Camera featured "images which appear unposed, spontaneous, or with their subjects captured unaware". Though the majority of the photos in the exhibition (more than 80 in total) were taken in Australia, images by Australian photographers working overseas were also included. Subjects included youth subcultures, newly arrived migrants, nuns, a number of prime ministers (not all of whom were in office when photographed), musicians such as Bon Scott of AC/DC, and ordinary people in everyday settings: at work, at the beach and at bus stops.

== Photographers represented in Candid Camera ==
- Max Dupain
- David Moore
- Jeff Carter
- Max Pam
- Robert McFarlane
- Mervyn Bishop
- Rennie Ellis
- Carol Jerrems
- Roger Scott

All of these have work held in the permanent collection of National Gallery of Australia. Mervyn Bishop is the only Aboriginal Australian included, and though his work has primarily been in New South Wales, Robert McFarlane was the only photographer to be born in South Australia. In this last regard, Candid Camera was very different to Century in Focus, an earlier large-scale photographic survey curated by Robinson, which dealt only with images taken in South Australia.

The Candid Camera exhibition and catalog both identified a number of different strands within Australian social documentary photography after the first generation – new photojournalism in the sixties, and the more personal approaches taken in the seventies – along with a number of themes in the subject matter: everyday life, the protest movements of the sixties, street photography and Australia's increasing engagement with Asia.

Though Robert McFarlane, formerly photographic critic on the Sydney Morning Herald and one of the photographers included in the exhibition, agrees that the exhibition's time frame was "the great period of photo-journalism internationally", he also believes that "the importance of documentary photography has never been greater, because Australia is changing dramatically in terms of its work habits and its racial make-up, and politically it is changing as well." In this, he echoes the original six photographers and their statement "Our manners, mode of living and appearance are changing more rapidly from year to year, and we feel the camera can and should be used to record this constant flux."

Candid Camera was accompanied by a series of talks, a program of Australian films from the same era, and screenings of Girl in a Mirror, a Rose d'Or–winning documentary about Carol Jerrems, who died in 1980 at the age of 30.
