= Julie Robinson (curator) =

Curator at the Art Gallery of South Australia

Julie Robinson is Senior Curator of Prints, Drawings & Photographs at the Art Gallery of South Australia, where she has worked since 1988, and is also on the teaching staff at the University of Adelaide, where she offers supervision in Art History. Her curatorial projects include Candid Camera: Australian Photography 1950s–1970s (2010) and A Century in Focus: South Australian Photography 1840s-1940s (2007). Writing about the latter while national arts critic of The Australian, Pulitzer Prize-winning critic Sebastian Smee said: "If you are at all interested in Australian photography, whether or not you are from SA, you will want to see this show, or at least get hold of the catalogue".

Robinson curated the 2004 Adelaide Biennial of Australian Art: Contemporary Photomedia. The arts critic for the South Pacific edition of Time, described it as a "powerful survey which goes to show that photography isn't dead". He noted that when Robinson curated her first photographic survey in 1990, "it was a more straightforward affair – pictures simply stared back at audiences" and went on to add, speaking of the Biennial, that "the 20 artists she has brought together in Adelaide explode the idea of what photography can be". Featured artists included Bill Henson, Tracey Moffatt, Mike Parr and Patricia Piccinini.

== Other exhibitions ==
Robinson also curated Five Centuries of Genius: European Master Printmaking (2000), Ann Newmarch: The Personal is Political (1997), Durer And German Renaissance Printmaking (1996), The Age of Rubens & Rembrandt: Old Master Prints From The Art Gallery of South Australia (1993), Hans Heysen: The Creative Journey (1992) and Fragmentation & Fabrication: Recent Australian Photography (1991).

== Publications ==
- Julie Robinson, Fragmentation & fabrication: recent Australian photography, Art Gallery Board of South Australia, 1990, ISBN 978-0-7308-0775-9
- Julie Robinson, Landscapes, visions in print by South Australian artists, South Australian Touring Exhibitions Programme, 1990, ISBN 978-0-646-00797-7
- Julie Robinson, Sir Hans Heysen, Hans Heysen: the creative journey, Art Gallery Board of South Australia, 1992, ISBN 978-0-7308-0782-7
- Julie Robinson, The age of Rubens & Rembrandt, Art Gallery Board of South Australia, 1993, ISBN 978-0-7308-3016-0
- Julie Robinson, Dürer and German Renaissance printmaking, Art Gallery of South Australia, 1996, ISBN 978-0-7308-3002-3
- Julie Robinson, Five centuries of genius: European master printmaking, Art Gallery of South Australia, 2000, ISBN 978-0-7308-3004-7
- Julie Robinson, Ann Newmarch: the personal is political, Art Gallery of South Australia, 1997, ISBN 978-0-7308-3042-9
- Julie Robinson, A Century in Focus: South Australian Photography 1840s-1940s AGSA/Thames & Hudson. 2007, ISBN 978-0-7308-3070-2
- Julie Robinson, Candid Camera: Australian Photography 1950s–1970s Art Gallery of South Australia exhibition booklet. 2010
