= Robert McFarlane (photographer) =

Australian photographer (1942–2023)

Robert McFarlane (1942–2023), was an Australian photographer, born in Adelaide, South Australia. He specialised in recording social and political issues, as well as documenting performance in film and theatre within Australia. Among the prominent figures he’s photographed are Charlie Perkins, Cate Blanchett and Bob Hawke. He has also been recognised for his contributions with a $50,000 award, named in honour of philanthropists Dr. Jim Bettison and Helen James.

== Early life ==
McFarlane was born in Glenelg, in beachside Adelaide, South Australia - 1942. He was given a Kodak Box Brownie at the age of 9 by his parents, Bill and Poppy McFarlane. Five years later, while at Brighton High School (today known as Brighton Secondary School) in Adelaide's southern suburbs, he used a then recently purchased Durst medium format rangefinder camera to capture an image of a teacher striking a pupil at the school assembly.

After leaving school he began to work in a small advertising agency, where his growing interest in photography was encouraged. In 1963 he moved to Sydney, where he began freelancing for magazines including The Bulletin, Vogue Australia and Walkabout.

== Career ==
Robert McFarlane began to work seriously as a photojournalist after being encouraged by his employers at his then job, as a copy boy in an advertising agency. He received a commission from Walkabout to photograph Professor John Bishop, co-founder of the Adelaide Festival of Arts. On the same assignment, he also made images of author Patrick White, dancer and choreographer Sir Robert Helpmann, actor John Bell, and painter Sidney Nolan.

In 1963, McFarlane moved to Sydney where he worked for The Bulletin and AustralianVogue. With the artist Kate Burness, who later became his first wife, he traveled to London and in 1969, he freelanced for The Daily Telegraph, The Sunday Times Magazine, and NOVA magazine. He returned to Sydney in 1973 and eventually to Adelaide in 2007.

Though McFarlane specialised in social issues—he worked on a book documenting mental illness—and performance. He also took portraits of a number of notable figures in Australian and international life. These include fellow photographers W Eugene Smith, Don McCullin, Jeff Carter, Max Dupain, David Moore, and Trent Parke; political figures such as Bob Hawke, Gough Whitlam, Charlie Perkins and Pauline Hanson; surgeon Sir Edward "Weary" Dunlop; jazz violinist Stéphane Grappelli; boxer Henry Cooper; and Atlantic Records co-founder Ahmet Ertegun. His theatrical work saw him cover a number of plays featuring Steven Berkoff, and he photographed the early performances of Geoffrey Rush, Cate Blanchett, and Robyn Archer. McFarlane also worked as a stills photographer for film directors such as Bruce Beresford, John Duigan, Gillian Armstrong, Esben Storm, Phillip Noyce, and PJ Hogan.

In 1985, in the lead-up to the 1988 bicentenary of Australia's European settlement, McFarlane was among 21 photographers chosen to live and work in remote Aboriginal communities in a project that became known as After 200 Years: Photographic Essays of Aboriginal And Islander Australia Today. It remains the largest single photographic project in Australian history and was published both as a touring exhibition and as a book.

A prominent exhibition was Received Moments, a 48-year career retrospective, which began touring Australia in December 2009 and concluded in Adelaide in late 2011. McFarlane was a significant contributor to Candid Camera: Australian Photography 1950s–1970s at the Art Gallery of South Australia (May to August 2010) which also featured the work of Australian photographers Max Dupain, David Moore, Jeff Carter, Mervyn Bishop, Rennie Ellis, Carol Jerrems and Roger Scott.

McFarlane wrote extensively about photography for a number of Australian publications and was a photographic critic for the Sydney Morning Herald for more than 25 years. He also wrote and maintained a website called OzPhotoReview, a blog focusing primarily on fine art and documentary photography in Australia while also discussing technical developments.

He died on 19 July 2023.

== The received moment ==
McFarlane did not write extensively on the subject, but his idea of the "received moment" attracted media and curatorial attention. Related in some ways to Henri Cartier-Bresson's "decisive moment", McFarlane's formulation has been seen as being "gentler, more contemplative". By suggesting the need for the photographer to remain open to the world around, it also has the advantage of containing the seed of a photographic method. Gael Newton, senior curator of photography at the National Gallery of Australia, has written about McFarlane's approach and quotes him as saying "I see making pictures as a receiving of the image. Where you stand, both physically and emotionally, decrees the kind of picture you, through your camera, will receive".

== Personal life ==
McFarlane's first wife was the artist Kate Burness. He later remarried to the theatre director Mary-Ann Vale. He had two children, Morgan (born 1974–1994 (to Burness) and Billy (born 1990, to Vale).

== Awards ==
- 2017: Jim Bettison and Helen James Award, from Adelaide Film Festival in collaboration with the Bettison and James Foundation

== Collections ==
McFarlane's work is held in the following permanent collections:

- National Portrait Gallery (Canberra)
- National Gallery of Australia
- Art Gallery of New South Wales
- Art Gallery of South Australia
- National Library of Australia

== General references ==
- McFarlane, Robert "Robert McFarlane Photos" website
- Newton, Gael "Robert McFarlane – Celebrated Australian Photographer", page 69, Antiques & Art in NSW, May–September 2009
- Newton, Gael "Robert McFarlane, Received Moments: Photography 1961–2009", Manly Art Gallery & Museum catalog essay
- Newton, Gael "Shades of Light: Photography and Australia 1839–1988", 1988 Australian National Gallery
- Robinson, Julie "Candid Camera: Australian Photography 1950s–1970s" Art Gallery of South Australia exhibition booklet
