= Australian Apple Review =

Australian computer magazine

- March 1985 cover
- Editor: Graeme Philipson, Gene Stephan, Gareth Powell
- Categories: Home computing
- Frequency: Monthly
- Founded: 1984
- Final issue Number: 1987; Vol. 4, No. 5
- Company: Gareth Powell Pty Ltd, Saturday Magazine Pty Ltd
- Country: Australia
- Based in: Randwick, New South Wales
- Language: English
- ISSN: 0816-7184

Australian Apple Review was an Australian computer magazine (ISSN 0816-7184) published by Gareth Powell Pty Ltd and Saturday Magazine Pty Ltd and initially printed by Offset Alpine and then by Ian Liddel Pty Ltd. The first issue was available in newsagents and dealerships in 1984 (36 pages) at the recommended price of $3.00. Its headquarters was in Randwick, New South Wales.

The magazine was published roughly monthly with 10 issues per year. The final issue was Vol 4 No 5 1987. The first editor of the magazine was Graeme Philipson. Later issues were edited by Gene Stephan and Gareth Powell.

The articles in Australian Apple Review catered for beginners to computing, through to highly technical programming techniques, industry updates and resources, with a focus on software, peripherals and computers available from Apple Computer. Articles were written by both full-time magazine staff and freelance contributors, including Paul Zabrs.
