= Bob Bottom =

Australian journalist

Robert Godier Bottom, OAM, better known as Bob Bottom, is a retired Australian investigative journalist and author.

== Career ==
In the words of Malcolm Brown in The Sydney Morning Herald, Bottom made "heroic, ground breaking efforts to expose organised crime" and "did more than any other single individual to bring crime and corruption to public attention in NSW in the 1970s and 1980s". At times, he and his family were afforded 24-hour police protection.

One of his most famous exposes, the release in 1984 through The Age newspaper of material on identities and rackets from telephone taps illegally carried out by undercover police in New South Wales, provoked state and national inquiries and ultimately prompted governments to allow law enforcement agencies to legally use telephone interception in organised crime cases.

Over the years, he has participated in 18 Royal Commission and other judicial and parliamentary inquiries and has played a key role in the establishment of state and national institutions to combat organised crime and corruption.

He sparked his first inquiry into the New South Wales police force with an exposé in The Bulletin magazine in 1963 with an article titled Behind the Barrier.

Since his retirement, Bottom still writes occasional articles, and has been a regular witness before parliamentary committee hearings reviewing law enforcement efforts to combat organised crime.

== Honours ==
In 1997, for his "service to the community and to journalism through the investigation and reporting of organised crime in Australia" Bottom was awarded the Medal of the Order of Australia (OAM) in the 1997 Australia Day Honours.

In 2003 he was made an honorary professor of journalism by Queensland's Jschool for his "outstanding contribution to journalism", and in 2019 he received the Danger Lifetime Achievement Award, part of the Sydney Crime Writers Festival.

== Bibliography ==
=== Author ===
- Behind the Barrier. Gladesville, N.S.W.: Gareth Powell Associates, 1969.
- The Godfather in Australia: Organised Crime's Australian Connections. Terrey Hills, N.S.W.: A. H. & A. W. Reed, 1979.
- Without Fear or Favour. South Melbourne: Sun Books, 1984.
- Connections: Crime Rackets and Networks of Influence Down-Under. South Melbourne : Sun Books, 1985.
- Connections II: Crime Rackets and Networks of Influence in Australia. South Melbourne : Sun Books, 1987.
- Shadow of Shame: How the Mafia Got Away with the Murder of Donald Mackay. South Melbourne : Sun Books, 1988.
- Bugged! : Legal Police Telephone Taps Expose the Mr Bigs of Australia's Drug Trade. South Melbourne : Sun, 1989.
- Fighting Organised Crime: Triumph and Betrayal in a Lifelong Campaign. Nelson Bay, N.S.W.: BBP, 2009.

=== Co-authored ===
- Inside Victoria: A Chronicle of Scandal – with John Silvester, Tom Noble and Paul Daley. Chippendale, N.S.W. : Pan Macmillan, 1991.

=== Edited ===
- Big Shots: A Who's Who in Australian Crime by David Wilson and Lindsay Murdoch. South Melbourne: Sun Books, 1985.
- Big Shots II by David Wilson and Paul Robinson. South Melbourne: Sun Books, 1987.
