= Jack Atley =

Australian photographer

Jack Atley is an Australian photographer.

== Life ==
Atley is a self taught photographer, teaching himself how to develop and print photography as a child. Atley starting shooting photos professionally in 1987 after winning a cadetship for the Sydney Morning Herald, selected as one of two people out of 2000 applications. In his second year he won Australian Sports Photographer of the Year After moving back to Melbourne and working with the Melbourne Age, Atley was the overall individual winner of Nikon-Walkley Australian Press Photographer of the Year in 1995, and in 2008 he was named as the runner up winner in Australia's richest Photographic/Art Portraiture Award – The Moran Portraiture Prize. In 2010 he was listed as a top ten finalist in the Sony World Photography Competition judged out of 37,617 entries.

After shooting the news he then spent the next 12 years covering major sporting events for Australia's leading daily newspapers, The Sydney Morning Herald and The Age.

More recently, he received the award as 2010 Volunteer of the Year by The Steve Waugh Foundation, the charity established by former Australian Test Cricket captain Steve Waugh that aids youths with rare diseases. In 2011, he was awarded the contract as The Official Photographer to document photographically the most significant changes to The Sydney Opera House site since it was first built.

In May 2011 he won the Open Section First Prize in The Moran Contemporary Photographic Prize – for an image taken on World Rare Disease Day.

Atley has taken many photos of famous people including George W Bush, HRH Queen Elizabeth II, Pope Benedict XVI, Vladimir Putin, Roger Federer, Tiger Woods, Sting and The Rolling Stones.

== Photographic awards ==
Atley has won first place in several photographic competitions:

- 1st Place Australian Sports Photographer of the Year – 1988
- 1st Place – The Australian Press Photographer of the Year Award – 1995
- 1st Place overall – The Moran Contemporary Photographic Prize – 2011
