= Robert Coltman =

American physician

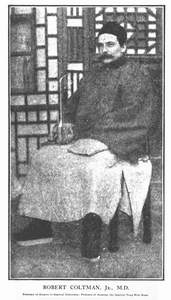
- Born: 19 August 1862; Washington, District of Columbia
- Died: 25 November 1931 (aged 69); Washington, District of Columbia
- Resting place: Glenwood Cemetery, Washington D.C.
- Education: Jefferson Medical College
- Occupations: Author; Physician; Professor

Robert Coltman, Jr. (August 19, 1862 – November 3, 1931) was an American physician, born in Washington, to Robert Coltman and Mary Jane Clements. He received his medical training at Jefferson Medical College, Philadelphia, and in 1881 began the practice of medicine. In 1896 he was appointed professor of anatomy at the Tung Wen College, Beijing, and in 1898 professor of surgery at the Imperial University, Beijing. He was personal physician to the Chinese royal household during that time. Li Hongzhang bestowed upon Dr. Coltman the decoration of the Double Dragon and made him a mandarin of the fourth rank.

== Biography ==
Robert married Alice Winifred Gallagher, on August 26, 1881 in Pennsylvania. He fathered six children from this marriage.

During the siege of Peking by the Boxers in 1900 he sent out the first message that reached the outside world, acting as correspondent for the Chicago Record. He became attorney for the Standard Oil Company at Tianjin, China.

He was author of The Chinese, their Present and Future: Medical, Political, and Social (1891) and Yellow Crime, or Beleaguered in Peking (1901).

Coltman retired in 1925 and returned to Washington, D.C, where he would die in 1931. He was a member of the following societies: a Mason, Sons of the American Revolution and the Society of the Cincinnati.

== Works ==
- Coltman, Robert (1891). The Chinese, their present and future: medical, political, and social Philadelphia: Davis. -University of Hong Kong Libraries, Digital Initiatives, China Through Western Eyes
- Beleaguered in Peking: the boxer's war against the foreigner (1901); reprinted (with a foreword by Gareth Powell) by China Economic Review Publishing Ltd., Hong Kong, 2008
