= Chance International =

Australian men's magazine

Chance International was a men's magazine founded in Sydney in 1966 by Gareth Powell Associates, which was basically Gareth Powell in association with Jack de Lissa. It used Playboy and Penthouse magazines as a model.

== Censorship and legal issues ==
The magazine was originally printed in Australia with the Griffin Press in Adelaide but almost immediately switched to Hong Kong as high quality printing at an affordable price was not then available in Australia.

In 1968, the Australian customs seized an issue of Chance at the wharf as it was being imported from Hong Kong on grounds that it was generally obscene and the point was made that it was published without permission, that is, the Customs had not been given a copy to approve before printing. One feature that annoyed and puzzled them was a cartoon strip called Barbarella, later made into a film starring Jane Fonda. The judge in the Equity Court in an early hearing ruled against Gareth Powell, and said in his summing up: "I am not sure what Barbarella was about but I suspect lesbianism." He ordered that issue of the magazine to be destroyed.

The dispute was a landmark case. An agreement had been reached, without consulting the plaintiff, that Customs officers would not have to give evidence. If this had not been the case and the customs officers had been made to give evidence, they would have been forced to either commit perjury or accept the magazine was not in breach of community standards. This resulted in the Australian customs, in effect, ceasing to take a moral view on the content of printed matter entering the country.

In 1970 Anthony Blackshield, a Senior Lecturer in Jurisprudence and International Law at Sydney University, argued:

Whatever the reason, the Crowe v. Graham version of community standards has been a major setback to the progress of Australian law. When Mr Justice Hadden decided in 1968 that Gareth Powell's magazine Chance was obscene (Chance International Pty. Ltd. v. Forbes (1968) 3 N.S.W. Reports 487), he was widely and publicly derided. But in fact, the precedent of Crowe v. Graham left him with little alternative.

Chance was "banned in perpetuity in two states, Queensland and Victoria".

In the early 1970s, Gareth Powell sold Chance, and other magazines he published including POL, and moved his operations to Hong Kong.

== Content and contributors ==
Chance International published works by some of Australia's best young photographers, such as Rennie Ellis, and was in many ways a breakthrough publication for Australia in terms of printing quality, photography and design.

The magazine also published articles and short stories from new authors of note such as Frank Moorhouse, Kit Denton, Gwen Kelly, Robert Williamson and Karl Shoemaker. Writer and critic Michael Wilding would later record that "mavericks ... Jack de Lissa, Ron Smith and later Gareth Powell had been publishing good, exciting and new fiction in Squire, Casual and Chance International in the late 60s" and added that "[those magazines] provided outlets for the new writing" as "[t]heir editors didn't have that orientation to particular traditions of the short story that the literary magazines seemed stuck to."

== Closure ==
Chance International became defunct in 1971.
