= Rennie Ellis =

Australian social and social documentary photographer

- Born: Reynolds Mark Ellis; 11 November 1940; Melbourne, Victoria, Australia
- Died: 19 August 2003 (aged 62); Melbourne, Victoria
- Occupation: Photographer
- Years active: 1969–2003

Reynolds Mark Ellis (11 November 1940 – 19 August 2003) was an Australian social and social documentary photographer. He also worked, at various stages of his life, as an advertising copywriter, seaman, lecturer, television presenter and founder of Brummels Gallery of Photography, Australia's first dedicated photography gallery, where he established both a photographic studio and an agency dedicated to his work, published 17 photographic books, and held numerous exhibitions in Australia and overseas.

== Early life and education ==
Born in the Melbourne beach-side suburb of Brighton and educated at Brighton Grammar School, Ellis won a scholarship to the University of Melbourne in 1959. He left during his first year to work as an office boy at Orr Skate & Associates, a Melbourne advertising agency. He subsequently studied advertising at the Royal Melbourne Institute of Technology, but before obtaining his diploma he spent two years travelling the world, having bought his first camera to record his travels, and worked as a seaman en route. Gregarious and outspoken, Ellis was never shy of controversy; in 1968 he rode a penny-farthing bicycle along St Kilda Road in a publicity stunt in protest against Melbourne's air pollution. Later, in his photographic career, he was to become known for his confronting imagery of Australian lifestyles.

== Photographer ==
By 1967, Ellis was creative director at Monahan Dayman Advertising in Melbourne. He was offered the position as Melbourne editor for Gareth Powell's and Jack de Lissa's Chance International magazine. He left Monahan Dayman Advertising in 1969 to become a freelance photographer. An early photo essay was on the then remote mining settlement of Kalgoorlie, which was published in 1970 in a Saturday edition of The Age, and in Walkabout magazine.

His first exhibition and a resultant book in collaboration with fellow photographer Wesley Stacey on Kings Cross, Sydney, followed in 1971. The book was launched in the Yellow House Artist Collective. Part of his work during this period was to guide photographers on 'safaris' into the outback. In another assignment, he was the stills photographer for Australian director Tim Burstall's sex romp Alvin Purple.

After founding Brummels Gallery of Photography, in 1974 Ellis went on to form Scoopix Photo Library in Prahran, which later became the exclusive Australian agent for New York's Black Star. In 1975 he opened his studio, Rennie Ellis & Associates, at the same premises, and operated from there for the rest of his life.

Once established as a photographer, Ellis worked, exhibited and published continuously; he showed, for example, in 1976 with Carol Jerrems Heroes and Anti-Heroes at The Photographers' Gallery and Workshop Magazines to which he contributed were diverse; Playboy and The Bulletin. His books and exhibitions were on Australian popular culture, including the beach, beer, graffiti, Australian railway stations and the Rio carnival.

In 1993 he became a co-presenter on the Nine Network's lifestyle program Looking Good, continuing in that role for three years and working with Deborah Hutton and Jo Bailey. In the same year his work was also included in Picture Freedom, an exhibition at The Photographers' Gallery in London and also exhibited Further Observationsat Melbourne's Photographers' Gallery, February 29 – March 17, 1996.

== Brummels Gallery ==
On 14 December 1972, Ellis and deputy director Robert Ashton launched the non-profit Brummels Gallery of Photography, partly funded by two Arts Council grants. It was the first privately run art gallery in the country to be devoted specifically to photography showcasing mainly Australian photographers though it also attracted shows from international photographic artists. Innovations included a Polaroid party in 1978, with cameras, flash bulbs and enough film for 320 exposures supplied by the instant photography company, and champagne to loosen inhibitions as participants pinned their pictures on the wall.

The first exhibition, Two Views of Erotica: Henry Talbot/Carol Jerrems (14 December 1972 – 21 January 1973), was opened by photographer and filmmaker, Paul Cox, who was soon to open The Photographers' Gallery around the corner in Punt Road, South Yarra. This period brought a reawakening to the photographic medium as an art form not seen since the Pictorialist era, and saw the National Gallery of Victoria open the first photography department in a government-run institution, under the curatorship of Jennie Boddington. From 1977, the gallery was sponsored by the camera manufacturer Pentax and was renamed Pentax Brummels Gallery of Photography.

The gallery closed in January 1980, having run for eight years, after it had advanced the standing of photography as art and the careers of many Australian photographers.

== Reception ==
Cultural commentator Phillip Adams in discussing Australian Graffiti, dubbed Ellis "Australia's oldest hippy." Art critic Nancy Borlase remarked, in relation to his inclusion, with Warren Breninger and Godwin Bradbeer in a 1978 Australian Centre for Photography show of the Melbourne photographers, that "Ellis, whose assured professionalism, in his The Way of Flesh series, places him in that class of photographers who use the camera as an extension of themselves, effortlessly and with obvious enjoyment," and quoting him as saying "I like photographing behind the scenes, like Brassaï."

== Legacy ==
Ellis died after suffering a cerebral haemorrhage at the age of 62. Since his death his second wife, Kerry Oldfield Ellis, and his assistant, Manuela Furci, have established the Rennie Ellis Photographic Archive, and continue to organise exhibitions of his work. These have included Aussies All: Portrait Photography by Rennie Ellis at the National Portrait Gallery in Canberra (2006), No Standing, Only Dancing at the Ian Potter Centre in Melbourne (2008), and Kings Cross 1970–1971: Rennie Ellis in Sydney (2017). Ellis's work was included in Candid Camera: Australian Photography 1950s–1970s at the Art Gallery of South Australia (2010) which also featured the work of key Australian photographers Max Dupain, David Moore, Jeff Carter, Robert McFarlane, Mervyn Bishop, Carol Jerrems and Roger Scott.

== Exhibitions ==
- 1 March 2024 to 28 January 2025: '"Melbourne Out Loud: Life through the lens of Rennie Ellis"' – State Library Victoria, Melbourne; presented as part of the 2024 RISING: festival

== Collections ==
- National Gallery of Australia
- National Portrait Gallery
- National Library of Australia
- National Gallery of Victoria (NGV) (Melbourne)
- State Library of Victoria
- Art Gallery of South Australia (Adelaide)
- Horsham Regional Art Gallery

== Books with photographs and/or text by Ellis ==
- Kings Cross Sydney: a personal look at the Cross. Melbourne: Thomas Nelson (Australia), 1971. Co-authored by Wesley Stacey.
- Sydney in colour. Melbourne: Lansdowne, c. 1971. Photographs by Rennie Ellis and John Carnemolla.
- Marks, Harry (1972), Concern, Nelson
- Australian graffiti. Melbourne: Sun Books, 1975. Foreword by Ian Turner.
- Ketut lives in Bali. London: Methuen Children's Books and Sydney: Methuen of Australia, 1976. Text by Stan Marks. Photographs by Rennie Ellis.
- Australian graffiti revisited. Melbourne: Sun Books, 1979, c. 1975. Co-authored by Ian Turner.
- Railway stations of Australia. South Melbourne: Macmillan, 1982. Photography by Rennie Ellis. Text by Andrew Ward.
- We live in Australia. Hove: Wayland, 1982.
- Life's a beach. South Yarra, Victoria: Currey O'Neil, 1983.
- Life's a beer. South Yarra, Victoria: Melbourne : Ross Books, 1984.
- Life's a ball. South Yarra, Victoria: Currey O'Neil:, 1985.
- The all new Australian graffiti. South Melbourne, Vic., Australia : Sun Books, 1985. Photographs by Rennie Ellis.
- Life's a parade. Port Melbourne, Victoria: Lothian, 1986.
- Life's a beach II: the adventure continues. Melbourne: Lothian, 1987.
- Life's still a beach. South Yarra, Melbourne: Hardie Grant Books, 1998.
- Up front: funny, filthy, philosophical advice from the T-shirt. South Yarra, Victoria: Hardie Grant Books, 1998.
- No standing, only dancing. Melbourne : National Gallery of Victoria, c. 2008. Photographs by Rennie Ellis and Susan van Wyk. Essay by George Negus.
- Decadent: 1980-2000. London, UK: Hardie Grant, 2014; Richmond, Victoria Hardie Grant Books, in association with the State Library of Victoria, 2014.Foreword by Manuela Furci. Essays by William Yang and Robert McFarlane.

== Media ==
- Music Around Us: Silent Music with Norbert Loeffler, Athol Shmith, John Cato, Rennie Ellis and Max Dupain, television broadcast ABV2, Thursday August 9, 1979.

== Further information ==
- "Rennie Ellis: Aussies All" photograph collection, National Library of Australia
- National Gallery of Victoria media kit "Rennie Ellis – The Artist"
- National Gallery of Victoria media kit "Rennie Ellis – The Exhibition"
- Hang Ten with Rennie Ellis by Janet Austin
