= Walkley Awards =

Australian awards for excellence in journalism

The annual Walkley Awards are presented in Australia to recognise and reward excellence in journalism. They cover all media including print, television, documentary, radio, photographic and online media. The Gold Walkley is the highest prize and is chosen from all category winners. The awards are under the administration of the Walkley Foundation for Journalism.

The Nikon Photography Prizes are also awarded by the Walkley Foundation at the awards ceremony, on behalf of Nikon.

== History ==
The awards were instituted in five categories in 1956 by businessman Sir William Walkley, founder of Ampol. After his death, the awards were handled by the Australian Journalists' Association which, in 1992, was merged into the Media, Entertainment & Arts Alliance. In 2000, the alliance voted to establish the Walkley Foundation. In that same year, the Walkley Awards were merged with the Nikon Press Photographer of the Year Awards.

The 2015 ceremony was held on 3 December at Crown Casino in Melbourne and was broadcast through an online live stream as well as on A-PAC. In 2016, the event moved to the Brisbane Convention & Exhibition Centre.

In 2023, the "Outstanding Contribution to Journalism" award was only open to women, after an internal research investigation noted there was significant historic female under-representation.

== Awards ==
Excluding the non-fiction book award, only work published by Australian-based media organisations is eligible for an award. Entries are initially evaluated by a jury on newsworthiness, research, writing, production, incisiveness, impact, public benefit, ethics, originality, innovation and creative flair — or other relevant criteria in respect of graphics and electronic media. The jury shortlists three entrants to the Walkley Advisory Board, who select the best entrant in each category, as well as the winner of the "Press Photographer of the Year", "Journalism Leadership Award" and the "Gold Walkley" awards.

Finalists are chosen by an independent board of eminent journalists and photographers. The awards cover all media including print, television, radio, photographic and online media. They can be regarded as the Australian equivalent of the Pulitzer Prize.

The Gold Walkley is the major award, being chosen from all category winners.

The awards have been archived by the Pandora Archive since 2002.

The finalists are formally announced in October each year and the awards are presented at a formal ceremony in late November or early December.

== Categories ==
As of 2020, awards are given in the following categories:

=== Major categories ===
- Gold Walkley
- Outstanding Contribution to Journalism
- Nikon-Walkley Australian Press Photographer of the Year

=== Longform journalism ===
- Walkley Book Award
- Walkley Documentary Award

=== Print/text journalism ===
- News Report
- Feature writing short (under 4,000 words)
- Feature writing long (over 4,000 words)

=== Photography ===
- News Photography
- Sport Photography
- Feature/Photographic Essay

==== Nikon Photography Prizes ====
These are not Walkley Awards, but administered by the Walkley Foundation on behalf of Nikon.

- Photo of the Year
- Portrait Prize
- Community/Regional Prize
- Contemporary Australian Daily Life Prize

=== Radio/audio journalism ===
- News and Current Affairs
- Audio Feature

=== Television/Video journalism ===
- News Reporting
- Current Affairs Short (less than 20 minutes)
- Current Affairs Long (more than 20 minutes)
- Camerawork

=== All media ===
- Innovation
- Coverage of a Major News Event or Issue
- Scoop of the Year
- Business Journalism
- Coverage of Community & Regional Affairs
- Investigative Journalism
- Coverage of Indigenous Affairs
- Sports Journalism
- Public Service Journalism
- Commentary, Analysis, Opinion and Critique
- Headline, Caption or Hook
- Production
- Cartoon

== Historical categories ==
- Journalism Leadership (1997–2017)
- Broadcast Interviewing (1997–2017?) - various name changes, most recently Interviewing.
- Three Headings
- Newspaper Feature Writing
- Magazine Feature Writing
- Artwork
- Daily Life Photography
- Editorial Graphics and Design
- Best Use of Medium
- Coverage of Suburban or Regional Affairs
- International Journalism
- Coverage of Asia-Pacific Region
- Coverage of Sport
- Social Equity Journalism
- Commentary, Analysis, Opinion and Critique|Commentary, Analysis, Opinion and Critique

== See also ==
- List of journalism awards
- Prizes named after people
