= Roger Scott (photographer) =

Australian photographer and photographic printer

Roger Scott (born 1944) is an Australian social documentary photographer and photographic printer.

In December 2001 Scott published a retrospective of his work, Roger Scott: From the Street, with a foreword by Gael Newton, senior curator of photography at the Australian National Gallery. In addition to 139 of Scott's photos, the book included an essay by Robert McFarlane, a fellow Australian photographer and photographic critic. In his essay, McFarlane suggested that Scott's photographs "are unique within Australian photography. The intimacies he records in the lives of his subjects show that, far from being another purist disciple of Cartier-Bresson's worthy maxim of the decisive moment, Roger Scott introduces a new kind of instant in Australian documentary photography - the irrevocable moment."

Scott's work was included in Candid Camera: Australian Photography 1950s–1970s at the Art Gallery of South Australia (2010).

== Book ==
- Scott, Roger. Roger Scott: From the Street. Neutral Bay, NSW: Chapter and Verse, 2001. ISBN 0-947322-24-8.
